= MTV Unplugged (Jay-Z album) =

Jay-Z: Unplugged

Live album by Jay-Z with the Roots
- Released: December 18, 2001
- Recorded: November 18, 2001
- Venue: MTV Studios, New York City
- Genre: Hip-hop
- Length: 58:15
- Label: Roc-A-Fella; Def Jam
- Producer: Questlove; the Roots; Ski

Jay-Z chronology
The Blueprint (2001)	Jay-Z: Unplugged (2001)	The Best of Both Worlds (2002)

The Roots chronology
The Roots Come Alive (1999)	Jay-Z: Unplugged (2001)	Phrenology (2002)

Professional ratings
Review scores
Source	Rating
AllMusic	4/5 stars
Robert Christgau	(3-star Honorable Mention)
Entertainment Weekly	A
HipHopDX	4/5 stars
NME	7/10
RapReviews	8.0/10
Rolling Stone	4/5 stars

Jay-Z: Unplugged is rapper Jay-Z's 2001 live album that contains some of his past songs with live instruments performed by the hip-hop band the Roots. The album, which sold more than 600,000 copies, was recorded during the taping of an MTV Unplugged 2.0 episode on November 18, 2001.

== Track listing ==
All songs were produced by Questlove, the Roots; "People Talking" produced by Ski.

No.	Title	Writer(s)	Length
1.	"Izzo (H.O.V.A.)"	Shawn Carter; Kanye West; Berry Gordy; Alfonso Mizell; Freddie Perren; Deke Richards	5:08
2.	"Takeover"	Carter; West; Lawrence Parker; Eric Burdon; Alan Lomax; Bryan Chandler; Rodney Lemay; Jim Morrison; John Densmore; Robby Krieger; Ray Manzarek	4:57
3.	"Girls, Girls, Girls"	Carter; Justin Smith; Tom Brock; Robert Reif	4:41
4.	"Jigga What, Jigga Who"	Carter; Jonathan Burks; Timothy Mosley	2:34
5.	"Big Pimpin'"	Carter; Mosley; Kyambo Joshua; Chad Butler; Bernard Freeman	4:11
6.	"Heart of the City (Ain't No Love)"	Carter; West; Michael Price; Dan Walsh	4:05
7.	"Can I Get A..."	Carter; Irving Lorenzo; Jeffrey Atkins; Robert Mays	1:42
8.	"Hard Knock Life (The Ghetto Anthem)"	Carter; Mark James; Charles Strouse; Martin Charnin	1:31
9.	"Ain't No"	Carter; Burks; Dennis Lambert; Brian Potter; August Moon; Tyrone Thomas	1:02
10.	"Can't Knock the Hustle / Family Affair" (featuring Mary J. Blige)	Carter; Marcus Miller; Meli'sa Morgan; Lesette Wilson /; Mary J. Blige; Bruce Miller; Andre Young; Camara Kambon; Asiah Lewis; Luchana Lodge; Mike Elizondo	6:06
11.	"Song Cry"	Carter; Smith; Douglas Gibbs; Ralph Johnson	7:04
12.	"I Just Wanna Love U (Give It 2 Me)" (featuring Pharrell)	Carter; Pharrell Williams; Chad Hugo; James Johnson; Christopher Wallace; Deric Angelettie; Sean Combs; Kit Walker; Todd Shaw	6:58
13.	"Jigga That Nigga / People Talking"	Carter; Jean-Claude Olivier; Samuel Barnes; Larry Gates	8:22

Sample credits

- "Izzo (H.O.V.A.)" contains an interpolation of "I Want You Back", written by Berry Gordy, Alfonso Mizell, Freddie Perren, and Deke Richards.
- "Takeover" contains interpolations of:
  - "Sound of da Police", written by Lawrence Parker, Eric Burdon, Alan Lomax, Bryan Chandler, and Rodney Lemay.
  - "Five to One", written by Jim Morrison, John Densmore, Robby Krieger, and Ray Manzarek.
- "Girls, Girls, Girls" contains an interpolation of "I Love You More and More Every Time", written by Tom Brock (singer) and Robert Reif.
- "Heart of the City (Ain't No Love)" contains an interpolation of "Ain't No Love in the Heart of the City", written by Michael Price and Dan Walsh.
- "Hard Knock Life (The Ghetto Anthem)" contains an interpolation of "It's the Hard Knock Life", written by Charles Strouse and Martin Charnin.
- "Ain't No" contains interpolations of:
  - "Ain't No Woman (Like the One I've Got)", written by Dennis Lambert and Brian Potter.
  - "Seven Minutes of Funk", written by August Moon and Tyrone Thomas.
- "Can't Knock the Hustle" contains interpolations of:
  - "Much Too Much", written by Marcus Miller.
  - "Fool's Paradise", written by Meli'sa Morgan and Lesette Wilson.
- "Song Cry" contain an interpolation of "Sounds Like a Love Song", written by Douglas Gibbs and Ralph Johnson.
- "I Just Wanna Love U (Give It 2 Me)" contains interpolations of:
  - "Give It to Me Baby", written by James Johnson.
  - "The World is Filled...", written by Christopher Wallace, Deric Angelettie, Sean Combs, Kit Walker, and Todd Shaw.

== Personnel ==
Musicians

- Kyle "Scratch" Jones – vocal percussion, backing vocals
- Ahmir "?uestlove" Thompson – drums
- James "Kamal" Gray – keyboards
- Leonard "Hub" Hubbard – acoustic bass
- Larry Gold – strings
- Ben Kenney – acoustic guitar
- Omar Edwards – keyboards
- Frank Walker – percussion
- Aaron "Gushie" Dramper – percussion
- Fiona Murray – strings
- Alexandra Leem – strings
- Ghislaine Fleischmann – strings
- Jaguar Wright – vocals
- Damon Bennett – flute

Technical personnel

- Ahmir Thompson – producer, mixing
- The Roots – producer
- Russel Elevado – mixing
- Kenyatta Saunders – mixing
- Rich Nichols – mixing
- Alex Coletti – producer for MTV
- Jan Benson – co-producer
- Milton Lage – director
- Adam Blackburn – audio engineer
- Shawn Carter – executive producer
- Damon Dash – executive producer
- Kareem "Biggs" Burke – executive producer
- Tony Dawsey – mastering
- Jason Noto – art direction and design
- Scott Gries – front cover photo
- Walik Goshorn - interior photos

== Charts ==
=== Weekly charts ===
Chart (2002)	Peak position
US Billboard 200	31
US Top R&B/Hip-Hop Albums (Billboard)	18

=== Year-end charts ===
Chart (2002)	Position
Canadian R&B Albums (Nielsen SoundScan)	99
Canadian Rap Albums (Nielsen SoundScan)	54
US Billboard 200	162
US Top R&B/Hip-Hop Albums (Billboard)	56

== Certifications ==
Region	Certification	Certified units/sales
United Kingdom (BPI)	Silver	60,000^{‡}
United States (RIAA)	Gold	500,000^{‡}
^{‡} Sales+streaming figures based on certification alone.
