= Slow Wind =

Single by R. Kelly

from the album TP-3: Reloaded
- Released: 2005
- Recorded: 2005
- Genre: R&B; reggae fusion
- Length: 3:21; 4:13 (remix)
- Label: Jive
- Songwriter(s): Robert Kelly
- Producer(s): R. Kelly

R. Kelly singles chronology
"Playa's Only" (2005)	"Slow Wind" (2005)	"Burn It Up" (2005)

"Slow Wind" is a 2005 single by R. Kelly from his seventh solo studio album TP.3 Reloaded, which is the second sequel to his iconic album known as 12 Play. The song was entirely written and produced by R. Kelly himself. The song is about three and a half minute long and a music video has been made for the song. "Slow Wind" is the fourth single on the album and made it at number 30 in the R&B/Hip Hop charts in the US, The remix made it at number 91 in the same chart and was released on R. Kelly's first remix compilation album the same year, Remix City, Volume 1. The remix featured Sean Paul and the R&B singer Akon on the track. No music video has been made for the remix, the remix is about one minute longer than the original.

== Music video ==
The music video is directed by Little X. and features Kelly with Jamaican females.

== Charts ==
Chart performance for "Slow Wind"
Chart (2005)	Peak position
US Billboard Hot R&B/Hip-Hop Singles & Tracks	30

=== Remix ===
Chart performance for "Slow Wind" (Remix)
Chart (2005)	Peak position
US Billboard Hot R&B/Hip-Hop Singles & Tracks	91
