= List of Trapped in the Closet chapters =

2007 musical comedy-drama film chapters

Trapped in the Closet is a 2005–2012 musical comedy-drama series directed by R. Kelly and Jim Swaffield and written by Kelly based on the song of the same name. Released as 33 chapters across three installments (the first two later repackaged together), the film follows protagonist Sylvester, a man who in order not to get caught cheating decides to hide in his affair's closet.

== Plot ==
=== Video synopsis: Chapters 1–12 ===
Chapter 1

Sylvester wakes up in bed with a woman who is not his wife. As he prepares to leave, the woman tells him her husband is coming up the stairs and tells Sylvester to hide in the closet. The couple begins making love when Sylvester's cell phone rings, prompting the husband to investigate. After searching elsewhere, he slowly approaches the closet. Sylvester, prepared for a confrontation, takes out his Beretta pistol.

Ending cliffhanger line: "Now he's opening the closet...."

Chapter 2

Having discovered Sylvester in his wife's closet, the husband nearly attacks him but stops because Sylvester is armed. He tells Sylvester that he is a pastor and not prone to violence. When Sylvester tries to leave, the husband tells him to stay because he wants to reveal a "secret". He then calls someone he calls "baby" and says to "turn the car around". Sylvester is anxious about what the husband is about to reveal and becomes threatening, but then someone knocks on the door. The husband opens the door and the person turns out to be another man—revealing the husband (Rufus) to be bisexual.

Ending cliffhanger line: "I can't believe it's a man....."

Chapter 3

A shocked and confused Sylvester prepares to leave but the wife asks him to stay. She then argues with her husband, Rufus, over his own infidelity. When Sylvester demands more explanation, the other man, Chuck, begins explaining how their affair came about. Rufus calls his wife Cathy, which shocks Sylvester, who thought her name was Mary. Rufus, Cathy, and Chuck all begin yelling at each other, prompting Sylvester to shoot his gun in the air to quiet them. Sylvester then calls home but is stunned when another man answers the phone. He quickly bolts out of the apartment.

Ending cliffhanger line: "I call up my home and a man picks up the phone...."

Chapter 4

Sylvester is seen rushing home, angered and belligerent, but is pulled over by a police officer, who gives him a ticket for speeding. He breaks in his own back door and surprises his wife in the shower only to find her alone. She reminds Sylvester that her brother Twan was coming home that day, and he answered the phone. Sylvester apologizes, and they begin making love. In the middle of it, however, Sylvester's wife, Gwendolyn, discreetly covers something on the bed and then jumps on top of Sylvester and begins to go wild. When Gwendolyn finally climaxes and rolls off him, Sylvester flips the bed cover to find the used condom that she had tried to hide.

Ending cliffhanger line: "Oh, my God, a rubber!"

The video for chapter four has since been revised to better match chapter six. Rondolo Bryce, the original actor for James, the officer, was changed to the current actor, Michael Kenneth Williams. And the line "I said 'This is some bullshit!', as he gave me the ticket" was changed to "He flicks his cigarette and then gives me the ticket." And "He said no except you were doing 85 in 60 miles zone" Change to "60 in the 40 miles zone" and "I turned my radio on and did 70 all the way home" changed to "and did 55 all the way home"

Chapter 5

Chapter five starts with Sylvester demanding answers about the condom. They argue, and Gwendolyn retorts with her own knowledge of Sylvester's infidelity, saying she saw Sylvester in the club the night before. He ignores that and demands she name names. She begins talking about friends of hers named Tina and Roxanne and also mentions Chuck and Rufus, which confuses Sylvester. She then explains that she and Cathy were friends in high school, and it was Cathy who introduced Gwendolyn to the police officer that stopped Sylvester, confirming that the police officer was her secret lover.

Ending cliffhanger line: "She introduced me to the policeman that stopped you."

Chapter 6

Sylvester and Gwendolyn begin laughing at the entire situation. She admits that the cop she slept with is really the one who answered the phone. And he explains the events of earlier in the morning. Meanwhile, the cop-lover turns his car back around, concerned for Gwendolyn's safety. He sees the back door broken in and mistakes the laughter for abuse and bursts into the bedroom, gun drawn. Sylvester pulls his gun on the cop, whose name is revealed to be James. Gwendolyn pleads with Sylvester, and he puts his gun down. But then James winks and smiles, and Sylvester rushes him. They wrestle over the gun, which inadvertently discharges.

Ending cliffhanger line: "Goin' all around the room, both hands on the gun, then all of a sudden, pow."

Chapter 7

This chapter reveals it was Twan, Gwendolyn's brother who was just released from prison, who was the one who was shot. After realizing who it was, Sylvester and James argue at who was at fault with the shooting, with Sylvester blaming the entire incident on the cop. Twan is presumed to be dead, but in the middle of Sylvester, James and Gwendolyn arguing, Twan coughs, assuring them he is okay and that he was only non-fatally shot in the shoulder. As Twan recovers in the bathroom, Sylvester begins telling him what caused the incident when someone knocks on the door. After being hesitant with answering the door, Sylvester grabs his gun and aims it at the door, Twan joins him, snatching James' gun. At the count of three, Twan opens the door and it is revealed to be the next door neighbor, Rosie, who is shown with a spatula in her hand. A relieved Sylvester and Gwendolyn invite Rosie in while James snatches his gun back from a bewildered Twan's hands and leaves.

Ending cliffhanger-outro line: "...With a spatula in her hand...like that's gon' do something against them guns, it's Rosie, the nosy neighbor."

Chapter 8

In this chapter, a tired and frustrated James drives back to his house and calls up his wife Bridget (Kelly sings all of Bridget's lines with a Southern accent). James tells a concerned Bridget that he was heading home, to which Bridget happily tells him she had baked him a cherry pie. Meanwhile, at Sylvester's house, Rosie, the next door neighbor, tells Sylvester, Twan and Gwendolyn that she could not stand the cop that just left their house causing Gwendolyn, Sylvester and Twan to laugh. Back at James' house, he pulls up to the garage. A panicked Bridget rushes to the door and kisses James. When James asks her why she looked jittery, Bridget excuses it as "may be that time of the month". The "may be" makes James suspicious. Bridget laughs it off, saying "you know what I mean". Bridget tries getting him upstairs, or enticing him with fresh pears, but James insists on heating some leftover chicken. Bridget's nervous breakdown finally leads to James demanding a straight answer from Bridget. James then starts to wonder if Bridget had also cheated on him. Unbeknownst to him and from the looks of a nervous Bridget, it becomes clear another man is still in the house.

Ending cliffhanger line: "But little does he know that somebody is still right there in his home!"

Chapter 9

James starts investigating his house for any possible intruders. When he hears a noise, he begins to search all over the kitchen while a panicked Bridget stands over by the dishes. After James checks the oven and looks behind the fridge, he notices the cherry pie with a slice cut out. When he realizes that Bridget is allergic to cherries, he turns to her and moves slowly to a scared Bridget. After demanding Bridget to move from her spot, which she eventually does, he sees the cabinet and slowly approaches it. Just as he opens it, the video suddenly stops and the narrator exits out of the kitchen pantry and, breaking the fourth wall, tells the audience that the man, hiding in the cabinet, is a midget.

Ending un-cliffhanger line: "Now, pause the movie, 'cause what I'm about to say to y'all is so damn twisted—not only is there a man in his cabinet, but the man is a midget! Midget! Midget! Midget!"

Chapter 10

In this chapter, the midget jumps out of the cabinet and fights with James. After James' constant roughing up on the midget, Bridget runs upstairs where she pulls out a number from her purse. Meanwhile, back downstairs, James puts the midget on the table and demands to know why he was at his house. The midget continues telling him that he was paid not to tell, which only angers James, who pulls his gun on him. When he does, the midget defecates. Back at Sylvester's house, he, Twan and Gwendolyn are playing cards when the phone rings. When Gwendolyn answers it, she hears a panicked Bridget, who tells her she found her number in James' pocket. After a minute, Gwendolyn hangs up and gives Sylvester and Twan the address to the house, presumably to stop the fight. Back at James' house, James and the midget continue fighting until Bridget comes back to the kitchen with a double-barreled shotgun. When James points his gun at Bridget, the midget takes his inhaler out. A few seconds later, Sylvester and Twan burst through the door and Sylvester points his gun at James. Sylvester and Twan notice a peculiar odor in the house (presumably from the midget). Due to Sylvester and Twan's entrance, the midget faints on the table.

Ending cliffhanger-outro line: "Ohhh, while Twan and Sylvester are sniffin' around, tryin' to figure out what's that smell—as they turn and look at each other like, 'What the hell?"

Chapter 11

In this chapter, the midget wakes up peculiar to seeing three guns and tries to get out of the situation. Sylvester then begs Bridget and James to put their guns down, to which they adamantly refuse. Bridget then tells Sylvester she will drop the gun if James does not hurt the midget, whose name is revealed as "Big Man", a stripper at a club called Dixie's. When Sylvester asks why he was named that, the midget points down to his pants and tell him he is "blessed." After seeing Sylvester and Big Man communicating, James shuts them up calling them "Chuck and Rufus", which confuses Sylvester, who demands to know how James knew of them, though James acts bewildered to Sylvester's question. Just as James looks as if he was going to answer, Bridget starts getting sick. It is then revealed that Bridget is three months pregnant, presumably with James' baby. After James' constant prompts to Sylvester, Twan and Big Man with his gun to leave, Bridget stops him and admits paying Big Man and even admitted that she knew that James had been cheating on her with Gwendolyn, saying that she had followed him around. When James demands to know what Bridget is really telling him, Bridget says that Big Man is her baby's father, which negates her previous excuse from chapter 8 as being "that time of the month". Big Man again faints at the news. As James looks in shock, Sylvester and Twan awkwardly leave.

Kelly switches from first person (as Sylvester) to third person narrative in the middle of this chapter as the focus fades away from his character.

Ending cliffhanger-outro line: "The midget faints again, while Twan and Sylvester is trippin. The midget's the baby's daddy. Woo!"

Chapter 12

Back at Cathy's house, she, Rufus and Chuck get up from the floor. After Cathy closes the door, she and Rufus argue about the reasons why Sylvester almost shot at them in Chapter 3, with Cathy angered about Rufus "creeping" around with Chuck, who is the deacon of Rufus' church, telling him "ain't no telling what I've got", referring to sexually transmitted diseases. Chuck gets angry at this and threatens Cathy with a knife, which prompts Cathy to force him to do it. Rufus then calms them down and tries to resolve the matter but neither Cathy or Chuck listen, as they continue arguing, even as the phone rings. When it rings a second time, Cathy answers it and it is Gwendolyn and she begins telling Cathy about the drama that had gone on. When Gwendolyn mentions that she saw Sylvester in Paje's club with "some crusty wig-wearing ass ho", Cathy realizes the man she had slept with that night was Sylvester. When Cathy tries telling her who the "ho" was, Gwendolyn stops her and tells her more about James and his situation. When an angry Rufus demands Cathy to finish their conversation, Cathy shuts Gwendolyn up and tells her she was the "ho" that had been with Sylvester.

Ending cliffhanger line: "I'm sorry, girl, but that ho was me...."

In the original version of Chapter 12 (which was originally going to be Chapter 6), Rufus said he was going to take back Cathy. This idea was later incorporated into the later chapters. Also, Gwen never called Cathy so Gwen would've never known Cathy was the one that slept with Sylvester.

=== Video synopsis: Chapters 13–22 ===
Chapter 13

The chapter initially starts with Sylvester and Twan in Sylvester's car though it is not clear at first where they are going. When Sylvester tells Twan to be on his best behavior and reminds Twan about how he got sent to jail, Twan says it "was because of Roxanne and that bitch Tina", which makes Sylvester remember his wife mentioning their names in chapter five. The scene soon cuts to Rosie the nosy neighbor and her husband Randolph (played by R. Kelly), who argue over Rosie spying on other neighbors. The argument ends when the scene cuts back to Sylvester explaining to Twan that he has to collect money from someone. He tells Twan to leave the car in drive and be on the lookout and enters a restaurant. An hour goes by with no sign of Sylvester.

Ending line: "(Time goes by) And now one hour later...."

Chapter 14

In chapter fourteen, it is revealed that apparently Sylvester and Cathy, who shows up in a blond wig and black dress, made a deal for Sylvester to get caught by her pastor husband Rufus but the deal had apparently backfired, not only by Cathy's realization that Sylvester and her best friend Gwendolyn were married but also due to Cathy not wanting to end her marriage to Rufus, with Cathy later admitting she had changed her mind on the deal. When Sylvester threatens to leave, Cathy tries to explain the reasons why. A waitress comes by and offers them drinks. Sylvester looks at the waitress thinking to himself that she looks familiar. Meanwhile, outside at Sylvester's car, Twan gets a call from a friend (only shown by a close-up of his mouth) about Tina, telling him Tina had stopped being a prostitute and was working at a "legit" place. He later tells Twan that Tina was working at the same restaurant where Sylvester is meeting Cathy. Back at the restaurant, Sylvester notices the waitress but can't think from where he knows her, until he sees her name tag which says "Tina." Sylvester then says he wants to talk to her but she gets scared and calls for her friend/co-worker Roxanne, who runs out with a frying pan. After Tina breaks a beer bottle and makes karate-styled moves saying to Sylvester that she and Roxanne take Tae Bo classes, Cathy and the rest of the patrons leave quickly, leaving Sylvester alone with Tina and Roxanne. Just as Tina and Roxanne are about to attack, Twan comes busting through the door threatening them.

Ending cliffhanger line: "I will kill both of y'all knucklehead asses...!"

Chapter 15

With Twan, Sylvester, Tina and Roxanne in the now-empty restaurant, Twan seeks revenge on Tina and Roxanne on his arrest three years ago. Sylvester tries calming Twan down reminding him he's on house arrest and that a violent outburst would lead to a more serious time in prison. After convincing Twan to let him talk to them, Sylvester approaches the two ladies and ask them what had happened on the day of his arrest. Tina and Roxanne explain that they were on a "simple operation" describing a "trip" to Atlanta. Roxanne tells Sylvester that a high Twan was swerving on the road and cutting up on the both of them, even turning his music loud playing "Mary Jane" and screaming "I'm Rick James, bitch!" Tina explains that as soon as that happened, they heard not only police squad cars but also a helicopter. Twan's car breaks down and all three are eventually arrested. In the interrogation room, the police tell the women that Twan blamed the drug deal on them in order to save his own skin. Roxanne tells Twan that that is when she turned him in. Roxanne says Tina protected him because Tina was pregnant with Twan's baby at the time.

Ending cliffhanger line: "Because at the time I was pregnant by you, T."

Indie folk musician Will Oldham makes a cameo in this chapter as one of the police officers in the interrogation.

Chapter 16

Sylvester, stunned at first at the news of Tina having Twan's child, congratulates Twan on the news but Twan is not convinced, accusing Tina of lying to him. This makes Tina's eye twitch, which had started when Sylvester had first approached her near the end of chapter 14. When Sylvester asks Roxanne about it, Roxanne explains a pimp had hit Tina in the eye a year ago and that she's had bad nerves ever since. Twan then pulls Sylvester to the side and begins wondering if he is really the father of Tina's child. Sylvester convinces him that a child would calm him down. When Twan tells Tina that he wants to make this work, Roxanne kisses Tina and reveals they are lovers.

Ending cliffhanger line: "I'm fucking her now...."

In the commentary remix on the Trapped in the Closet DVD, Kelly tells the audience that in the upcoming chapters he will probably give Tina about three chapters to explain her nervous eye twitch.

Chapter 17

Stunned at the news of Roxanne and Tina being lovers, a frustrated Sylvester points his gun at the both of them, but soon stops because of his tolerance to lesbians, while Twan kept egging him to shoot them. Sylvester tries to get Twan to leave the restaurant. It's only after Twan threatens Tina and Roxanne that he will buy a gun and come back for them later that Sylvester finally convinces Twan to leave.

Ending line: "Give me my motherfuckin' coat!"

Chapter 18

Back at the car as they drive away, Twan is still angry over seeing Roxanne and Tina together, despite Sylvester's efforts to calm him down. Around this time, Sylvester gets a phone call from Gwendolyn, who tells him that his father Dale had been drinking and cursing people out, and his mother Myrna had Dale put in jail. The scene then shifts to Rufus' church where he is leading the worship song, "Jesus Will Work It Out", with Reverend Mosley James Evans and the Peace Within Choir. When the song reaches a climax, Rufus gets a phone call and excuses himself to his office. It's Chuck, who's crying and upset over not seeing Rufus since the incident in the earlier chapters. Rufus and Chuck argue when Cathy walks in Rufus' office. When Cathy asks Rufus who was on the phone, Chuck, who can be heard accidentally on speaker phone, cries out for Rufus, which angers Cathy and the two argue before Rufus sends Cathy out to deal with the situation. Rufus then tries to let Chuck come see him so they can talk but Chuck refuses. Rufus then tells Chuck that he wants to stay married because he loves his wife and is a Pastor as the reason he doesn't want to see Chuck anymore. This angers Chuck, who threatens to reveal their relationship. When Rufus again tries to get Chuck to come see him, Chuck reveals he is in a hospital.

Ending line: "Chuck coughs and says 'Because I'm in the hospital...'"

Chapter 19

Reverend Mosley James Evans and the Peace Within Choir attempt to persuade Pimp Lucius, a pimp with a severe stuttering problem, to stop pimping and to turn his life around. As the choir sings "you can do it Pimp Lucius", Lucius pretends to accept the offer and leaves the church. However, he then tells his pimpin' partner, Bishop Craig, that he is never going to "stop p-p-p-p-p-pimpin'", because "p-p-p-pimpin's the life". Then he tells Bishop Craig "now let's get this mmm-mmmm-money."

Ending scene: Pimp Lucius points to the choir and says, "CHURCH! Church!" He becomes embarrassed and overwhelmed by being on the altar, looks around, and accidentally blurts out "SHIT!" He then says "oops", and leaves the church with Bishop Craig and his "escorts".

Chapter 20

This chapter shows Rosie the Nosy Neighbor's house where Rosie is seen in her chair reading the Bible when her husband Randolph comes in shouting, "he's got the package!" to Rosie. Unwilling to listen to reason, when Randolph tells her he has news on the pastor (Rufus), she demands to know what was going on with him. After some bickering, Randolph tells Rosie the story: while working as a janitor for the church, Randolph hears Rufus coming into the office. Randolph hid in the closet and unintentionally overheard the conversation seen in chapter eighteen among Chuck, Rufus and Cathy. After relaying the story, Rosie asks Randolph why he had said the pastor had "the package", Randolph says that Chuck told him he was at the hospital. Rosie immediately decides to inform the masses, despite Randolph's protests. The chapter ends with Randolph sitting on the couch, falling asleep.

Ending line: "Now don't go tellin' ev'rybody ’round town, Rosie, with your big-mouthed ass!"

"The Package" is implied to be HIV/AIDS because of the slang term the whole package defined as prison slang for the disease. Given the large-scale interconnecting relationships in the series, this is a serious issue affecting most if not all of the characters.

Chapter 21

Sylvester and Twan go to visit an apparent mobster named Joey. Sylvester informs Joey of some job that could get them a lot of money. While there, Joey accuses Twan of being a cop, as well as calling him "LL Fool J", deeply offending Twan. Sylvester, trying to defuse the situation, asks Twan to wait outside the office while he and Joey discuss business. As Twan leaves the room, he remarks, "I'll be listening from the outside." Joey replies, "Yeah, yeah, whatever. Mama said knock you out, fuck outta here." While waiting outside, Twan has a nightmare of Sylvester and him in the same situation, being pointed at with guns. In the end, Sylvester wakes Twan up, then Joey and Sylvester say their goodbyes, and Joey asks Sylvester to tell Gwendolyn he says hello, as their deal is sealed.

Ending line: "This guy!"

Chapter 22

The scene opens to 'ol' Dale and Myrna's' voicemail and eventually fades into the middle of the voicemail box where the narrator (Kelly) says, "and now the rumor". Throughout a series of phone conversations among all of the original characters from Chapters 1–12 and those introduced in Chapter 13–22, rumors of "The Package" circulate. Because Chuck has it, it has possibly been passed to Rufus, to his wife Cathy, to Sylvester, and to Gwendolyn. In addition, Bridget realizes that James knows both Chuck and Rufus, though he tried to hide it from her earlier, suggesting he may be on the "down-low" with Chuck as well. Gwendolyn also cheated on Sylvester with James. However, she used a condom as revealed in Chapter 4. This would still put Bridget, Big Man, and James at serious risk. Lastly, Pimp Lucius gets a similar concerned call from an unidentified woman.

Closing scene: The screen fades to black with the words "To be continued".

=== Video synopsis: Chapters 23–33 ===
Chapter 23

This chapter starts off with Sylvester and Gwendolyn watching TV and getting a mysterious phone call. Then it goes over to Cathy and Rufus, who decided to go shopping downtown. Cathy's phone rings and she exclaims its 'those people' again. Rufus tells her to hang up. Bridget gets an offer that might make her famous, Twan is proffered money in exchange for an unknown service, and most of the rest of the cast also get a mysterious phone call.

Ending line: "But there was no luck when it came to getting in touch with Chuck. Where are you, Chuck?"

Chapter 24

The chapter starts off with Twan winning a bet during a sports game at the local barber shop. Meanwhile, outside, Pimp Lucius is yelling at his prostitutes over a lack of money that's been coming in. He then states if he doesn't get his money soon he'll start hitting the girls, and it is revealed that he is responsible for Tina's nervous twitch. Sylvester and Twan come outside where after a comical encounter with Lucius, they attempt to walk away ending the chapter.

Ending line: "...Sylvester you real funny."

Chapter 25

The chapter begins directly after the previous as Pimp Lucius calls Sylvester over to ask him for a couple of "racks". He then says that he'll pay Sylvester back on the first chance he gets. Sylvester tells Lucius he needs to go and see his parents, and then Sylvester and Twan depart from the scene, frustrating Lucius more.

Ending line: "...Now just stop it! Go get the car! Go!"

Chapter 26

This chapter contains Cathy's confessional for Out of the Closet with Larry and her ultimatum for her husband, Rufus. The chapter switches to a pan on the door of Doctor William T. Perry, a marriage counselor. The doctor is getting off the phone as Rufus and an impatient Cathy walk into the room. Rufus is at first reluctant and asks the doctor not to record their session. Cathy then breaks down and begins to cry over the fact that Rufus loves a man over her. Rufus then pronounces that he is confused and still loves Chuck.

Ending cliffhanger line: "...What have I done?"

Chapter 27

This chapter begins with Rufus getting on his knees and praying to God to change his ways. Meanwhile, Doctor Perry tries to convince Cathy to go back inside the room and console Rufus as well as make amends. He details a past couple that had a relationship that he was upset never got fixed, and pleads for Cathy to not do that to her own relationship. Back in the office, Rufus calls out to God asking how God was going to help him. Just as he does this, Cathy comes back in the room and forgives Rufus—saying she's willing to work it out. The chapter then switches over to Rufus' confessional. Rufus was tricked into coming on the show by the staff; he believed he was there to talk about the church and the community but he is bombarded by questions about his personal life. After an insinuation by an off-screen director, he leaves the set.

Ending line: "...Does Chuck have AIDS? Is that what the Package is?! Sir? Sir are you gonna answer the question?"

Chapter 28

Rosie and Randolph are the central characters in this chapter. Randolph can't sleep and wakes Rosie up, and asks if she meant it when she called him Mr. Can't-Get-It-Up in Chapter 13. She tries to leave the conversation but Randolph begins dancing around, taunting her and saying he's going to take off his pajamas and flash her. The doorbell rings, interrupting their shenanigans, and Randolph goes to answer the door. The scene switches to Rosie in her confessional, she calls Randolph 89 and insinuates that he has a tiny penis. Then it goes to Randolph's confessional. He attempts to defend himself from Rosie's insinuations; she comes on the set and two begin to fight comically. The off-screen director is yelling for them to stop, but they only continue.

Ending line: "...Oh, you want some of this don't ya?"

Chapter 29

The chapter starts off with Reverend Mosley James Evans in an advertisement about his new book, Trapped in the Closet. He dances around and compares his book to the Bible. The scene changes to Roxanne talking about the Preacher to Tina and saying that the man is a con artist. Tina tells Roxanne not to say those things about the Reverend. A fight ensues and Tina ends up dumping Roxanne and saying she's going to go find Twan. The chapter then goes to Tina's confessional where she says she appreciated Roxanne for taking her in but she says it's time for her to find her own identity. She also states she will be coming onto the Out of the Closet show. The scene then switches to Roxanne's confessional, where she talks about how ungrateful Tina is being and that the argument isn't over.

Ending line: "...Twan? She crazy if she thinking she's leaving me for his gorilla-body having ass."

Chapter 30

This chapter starts off with Sylvester and Twan in a private garage going over their plans for a future meeting with an unknown gangster. Twan lifts his shirt up and shows Sylvester that he bought a gun, Sylvester takes it from him until after the deal. Sylvester warns him one more time about the delirious mobster they're about to meet. The two of them then get into the car. The chapter then switches to the simultaneous confessionals of Sylvester and Twan. Twan starts off by saying that Sylvester never lets him have fun. Sylvester then informs the viewers that Twan likes to talk a lot but can't really back it up. He then informs him that true thugs move in silence. After a comical dialogue, the chapter ends with them laughing.

Ending line: "...Man, you gotta love this man."

Chapter 31

The chapter involves Pimp Lucius going home to see his parents, who turn out to be Randolph and Rosie. Randolph is at first angry and doesn't want to let Lucius in but Rosie insists he come in. Rosie gets mad at Randolph and calls him by his middle name, Douglas. The chapter continues with Lucius explaining the mysterious phone calls he's getting and his need for money and a place to sleep. It ends with Randolph answering the door again to find Lucius' prostitutes whom he compares to En Vogue.

Ending line: "...It's En Vogue, with a new lead singer."

Chapter 32

Pimp Lucius chews out his prostitutes in this chapter trying to find out why they didn't stay in the car while he talked to his parents. The girls say the blind prostitute got worried and asked them to go up to the door to find out if Lucius was okay. Pimp Lucius doesn't believe them and sends them back to the car. Lucius then reflects as the girls walk away. The chapter then goes over to the dramatic confessional of Pimp Lucius alongside his four prostitutes. He talks about his father denying him money and a place to sleep. He wonders why his father could have done something like this to him, considering the fact that he is family.

Ending line: "...Call me a pimp, a thug, I'm still his blood. How could he do this to me? Church!"

Chapter 33

The last chapter involves Sylvester and Twan meeting up with the mobster, Beeno. The conclusion of Part 3 begins with the character Bankhead opening the door, at first reluctant to let the men in. He warns and threatens them and then guides the men to Beeno. Beeno is eating sunflower seeds aggressively and listens to Sylvester as he makes his proposal. Something seems to be bothering Beeno's throat and he reveals that Joey shot him in the neck during a past deal. Beeno doesn't much care for Sylvester's humor and tells his men to kill them after revealing that he is aware of Sylvester making deals with the Italians. Twan saves the day and takes Bankhead's gun and the two flee, but not before Beeno has promised Sylvester and Twan that their families and friends "won't live to see the weekend". Then the melody changes to an upbeat one, as Bankhead and his crew chase Sylvester and Twan. The two men run and end up hiding behind a garbage bin. After assuring that they weren't followed, Sylvester reveals to Twan that they're standing outside of the back entrance to the show that the cast has been doing confessionals for, Out of the Closet with Larry. The two men walk inside and the chapter ends as the show is about to begin.

Ending cliffhanger line: "Ladies and Gentlemen, welcome to the Out of the Closet show. Now give it up for your host, Larry!"
