= TITC =

TITC may refer to:

- The IT Crowd, a British sitcom
- Trapped in the Closet, a rap opera by R. Kelly
