= In the Kitchen =

Single by R. Kelly

from the album TP.3 Reloaded
- B-side: "Trapped in the Closet, Chapter 1"
- Released: April 5, 2005
- Recorded: 2004
- Genre: R&B
- Length: 3:37
- Label: Jive
- Songwriter: Robert Kelly
- Producer: R. Kelly

R. Kelly singles chronology
"Don't Let Me Die" (2004)	"In the Kitchen" (2005)	"Trapped in the Closet (Chapter 1)" (2005)

"In the Kitchen" is a song by R. Kelly, released domestically in 2005 as a double A-side single together with "Trapped in the Closet (Chapter 1)". Both songs are from the studio album TP.3 Reloaded. It also served internationally as the B-side to "Playa's Only" featuring The Game.

== Charts ==
=== Weekly charts ===
Chart (2005)	Peak position
UK Singles (Official Charts Company)	33
Belgium (Ultratop) Single Chart	42
Belgium (Ultratip Flanders) Single Chart	2
Belgium (Ultratip Wallonia) Single Chart	2
French Singles Chart	51
German Singles Chart	35
Irish Singles Chart	31
Dutch Singles Chart	48
New Zealand Singles Chart	22
Swiss Singles Chart	28
U.S. Billboard Hot 100	91
U.S. Billboard Hot R&B/Hip-Hop Songs	41
