= Honey (Jay-Z and R. Kelly song) =

2002 single by R. Kelly and Jay-Z

Single by R. Kelly and Jay-Z

from the album The Best of Both Worlds
- Released: January 16, 2002
- Recorded: January 2002
- Genre: Hip hop; R&B
- Length: 4:02
- Label: Roc-A-Fella; Def Jam; Rockland
- Songwriters: Shawn Carter; Robert Kelly; Trackmasters; Maurice Gibb; Barry Gibb; Robin Gibb
- Producers: R. Kelly; Poke and Tone

R. Kelly singles chronology
"The World's Greatest" (2001)	"Honey" (2002)	"Get This Money" (2002)

Jay-Z singles chronology
"Girls, Girls, Girls" (2001)	"Honey" (2002)	"Jigga That Nigga" (2002)

"Honey" is a song by American singer R. Kelly and American rapper Jay-Z. It samples "Love You Inside Out" by the Bee Gees and is also co-written by the song producers, Poke and Tone. It was released in late 2002 as the first single from The Best of Both Worlds. It peaked at number 109 on the Billboard Hot R&B/Hip-Hop Songs. The song charted at number 35 on the UK Singles Chart and 84 on the Australian singles chart. No music video was filmed for the song.

== Charts ==
Chart (2002)	Peak position
Australia (ARIA)	84
Belgium (Ultratip Bubbling Under Flanders)	14
Belgium (Ultratip Bubbling Under Wallonia)	15
UK Singles (Official Charts)	35
US Bubbling Under R&B/Hip-Hop Singles (Billboard)	9
