= Izzo (H.O.V.A.) =

2001 single by Jay-Z

Single by Jay-Z

from the album The Blueprint
- Released: June 19, 2001
- Recorded: May 2001
- Studio: Baseline Studios (New York City)
- Genre: East Coast hip-hop; chipmunk soul; pop-rap
- Length: 4:00
- Label: Roc-A-Fella; Def Jam
- Songwriters: Shawn Carter; Kanye West; Berry Gordy; Alphonso Mizell; Freddie Perren; Deke Richards
- Producer: Kanye West

Jay-Z singles chronology
"Fiesta (Remix)" (2001)	"Izzo (H.O.V.A.)" (2001)	"Girls, Girls, Girls" (2001)

Music video
- "Izzo (H.O.V.A.)" on YouTube

"Izzo (H.O.V.A.)" is the lead single from American rapper Jay-Z's sixth album The Blueprint. Produced by Kanye West, the song prominently samples "I Want You Back" (1969) by The Jackson 5. "Izzo (H.O.V.A.)" was debuted at the inaugural BET Awards on June 19, 2001. It reached number eight on the Billboard Hot 100, becoming Jay-Z’s first solo song to enter the top 10.

== Background and composition ==
The song's title is a reference to Jay-Z's "Hova" nickname, which itself is a reference to Jehovah, one of God's names. He said the nickname was given to him by a friend for his ability to rap without writing down the lyrics—like a "God". "Izzo (H.O.V.A.)" is one of four songs on The Blueprint produced by Kanye West. An upcoming producer at the time, West sold the song's beat to rappers Ghostface Killah and Cam'ron before it was ultimately used by Jay-Z.

Billboard described "Izzo (H.O.V.A.)" as Jay-Z's "song of triumph". Its instrumental features kick-drums, orchestral strings, and a sample of the song "I Want You Back" (1969) by The Jackson 5. On the track, Jay-Z raps about his life story, including his past as a drug dealer. He also discusses his not guilty plea for allegedly assaulting record executive Lance Rivera in 1999.

== Release and performance ==
Jay-Z debuted "Izzo (H.O.V.A.)" on June 19, 2001, during the inaugural BET Awards. The song was later released by Def Jam Recordings as the lead single from The Blueprint.

Peaking at number 8 on the Billboard Hot 100, "Izzo (H.O.V.A.)" marked Jay-Z's first solo song to enter the top 10. It also charted in Australia, Scotland, the Netherlands, Switzerland, and the UK. The song was certified Platinum by the Recording Industry Association of America, and certified Silver by the British Phonographic Industry.

== Music video ==
The music video was filmed in Los Angeles on a street made to look like New York City, and features cameos from Damon Dash and Kanye West. It was directed by Dave Meyers. The video was premiered on MTV's Total Request Live on August 21, 2001.

== Copyright infringement lawsuit ==
"Izzo (H.O.V.A.)" (2001)
A 24-second sample of "Izzo (H.O.V.A.)" by Jay-Z from The Blueprint

On October 31, 2001, a copyright lawsuit was filed against Jay-Z by Demme Ulloa, who claimed that she was not paid for her contribution to "Izzo". Ulloa asserted that it was her singing "H to the izzo/V to the izzay", though she didn't receive any money for her contribution and was not credited in the liner notes of The Blueprint. The joint authorship claim was dismissed in 2004 but continued to proceed for a copyright infringement claim, which was ultimately settled.

== Credits and personnel ==
Credits adapted from the liner notes of The Blueprint.

Studio locations

- Mastered at Masterdisk, New York City, New York.
- Mixed at Right Track Studios, New York City, New York.
- Recorded at Baseline Studios, New York City, New York.

Personnel

- Jay-Z – songwriting, vocals
- Kanye West – production, songwriting
- Berry Gordy – songwriting
- Alphonso Mizell – songwriting
- Freddie Perren – songwriting
- Deke Richards – songwriting
- Young Guru – recording
- Kamel Adbo – recording
- Ken "Duro" Ifill – mixing
- Tony Dawsey – mastering

Samples

- "Izzo (H.O.V.A.)" contains elements of "I Want You Back", as performed by The Jackson 5 and written by The Corporation (Berry Gordy, Alphonso Mizell, Freddie Perren and Deke Richards).

== Charts ==
=== Weekly charts ===
Chart (2001)	Peak position
Australia (ARIA)	23
Australian Urban (ARIA)	11
Netherlands (Dutch Top 40 Tipparade)	9
Netherlands (Single Top 100)	69
Scottish Singles Sales (Official Charts)	29
Switzerland (Schweizer Hitparade)	53
UK Singles (Official Charts)	21
UK Dance (Official Charts)	8
UK Hip Hop/R&B (Official Charts)	7
US Billboard Hot 100	8
US Hot R&B/Hip-Hop Songs (Billboard)	4
US Hot Rap Songs (Billboard)	7
US Rhythmic Airplay (Billboard)	4

=== Year-end charts ===
Chart (2001)	Position
US Billboard Hot 100	52
US Hot R&B/Hip-Hop Songs (Billboard)	30

== Certifications ==
Region	Certification	Certified units/sales
United Kingdom (BPI)	Silver	200,000^{‡}
United States (RIAA)	Platinum	1,000,000^{‡}
^{‡} Sales+streaming figures based on certification alone.
