= The Best of Both Worlds (Jay-Z and R. Kelly album) =

Studio album by R. Kelly and Jay-Z
- Released: March 19, 2002
- Genres: Hip-hop; R&B
- Length: 49:16
- Labels: Roc-A-Fella; Jive; Def Jam; Island Def Jam
- Producers: R. Kelly; Poke and Tone; Megahertz; Charlemagne

R. Kelly and Jay-Z chronology
The Best of Both Worlds (2002)	Unfinished Business (2004)

R. Kelly chronology
TP-2.com (2000)	The Best of Both Worlds (2002)	Chocolate Factory (2003)

Jay-Z chronology
MTV Unplugged (2001)	The Best of Both Worlds (2002)	The Blueprint 2: The Gift & The Curse (2002)

Singles from The Best of Both Worlds
- 1. "Honey" Released: January 16, 2002; 2. "Get This Money" Released: March 2002; 3. "Take You Home with Me a.k.a. Body" Released: May 21, 2002

The Best of Both Worlds is the first collaborative album by American singer R. Kelly and American rapper Jay-Z. It was released on March 19, 2002, through Jive Records, Roc-A-Fella, Def Jam Recordings and The Island Def Jam Music Group. The album was produced primarily by R. Kelly and Poke and Tone, with additional production by Megahertz and Charlemagne. The album features guest appearances by Beanie Siegel, Lil' Kim, and Devin the Dude.

The Best of Both Worlds was supported by three singles: "Honey", "Get This Money" and "Take You Home with Me a.k.a. Body". The album debuted at number two on the US Billboard 200 chart, selling 223,000 copies in its first week. Despite this, critical reception was generally mixed.

== Singles ==
The album spawned three singles from its songs. The first single, "Honey" was released on January 16, 2002 as the lead single for the album. It was produced by R. Kelly and Poke and Tone. The song contains a sample of "Love You Inside Out" by the Bee Gees. The single failed to chart on the US Billboard Hot 100 but managed to peak at number 35 on the UK Singles Chart. The second single, "Get this Money" was released in March 2002. The third single, "Take You Home with Me a.k.a. Body" was released on May 21, 2002. Both of which failed to chart.

== Critical reception ==
Professional ratings
Review scores
Source	Rating
AllMusic	2/5 stars
Blender	3/5 stars
Entertainment Weekly	C+
The Guardian	2/5 stars
Now	2/5 Ns
RapReviews	4.5/10
Robert Christgau	(2-star Honorable Mention)
Rolling Stone	2/5 stars
USA Today	3/4 stars

The album received generally mixed reviews from music critics. Jason Birchmeier of AllMusic stated that "while the idea of a collaborative album was a reasonable one, the album falls terribly short of both artists' high standards". He also called the album uninspired and claims it "rates among the poorest efforts -- arguably the poorest -- in either Kelly's or Jay-Z's catalog to date." He gave the album a two star rating out of five.

Steve Jones of USA Today gave the album a better review, calling the album "falls short of genius". He claims "The two charismatic hitmakers mesh well and represent for their respective genres." In addition, he also believes that "They don't, however, really push each other to the next level or break the ground you might expect from this kind of meeting of the minds." He gave the album three out of four stars.

In retrospect, Jay-Z said: "I think the first The Best of Both Worlds is amazing".

== Commercial performance ==
The Best of Both Worlds debuted at number two on the US Billboard 200 chart, selling 223,000 copies in its first week. This became Jay-Z's fifth US top-ten album and R. Kelly's fifth on the chart. In its second week, the album dropped to number four on the chart, selling an additional 137,000 copies. In its third week, the album dropped to number six on the chart, selling 82,000 more copies. On May 14, 2002, the album was certified platinum by the Recording Industry Association of America (RIAA) for shipments of over one million copies. In 2002, The Best of Both Worlds was ranked as the 99th most popular album in the US. As of November 2004, the album has sold 875,000 copies in the United States.

== Track listing ==
No.	Title	Writer(s)	Producer(s)	Length
1.	"The Best of Both Worlds"	Shawn Carter; Robert Kelly; Dorsey Wesley	Megahertz	3:12
2.	"Take You Home with Me"	Carter; Kelly; Samuel Barnes; Jean-Claude Olivier	R. Kelly; Poke and Tone	3:35
3.	"Break Up to Make Up"	Carter; Kelly	R. Kelly; Poke and Tone	4:08
4.	"It Ain't Personal"	Carter; Kelly; Ronald Isley; Rudolph Isley; O'Kelly Isley; Ernie Isley; Marvin Isley; Chris Jasper	R. Kelly; Poke and Tone	4:24
5.	"The Streets"	Carter; Kelly	R. Kelly	4:34
6.	"Green Light" (featuring Beanie Sigel)	Carter; Kelly; Dwight Grant	R. Kelly; Tone^{[a]}	2:48
7.	"Naked"	Kelly	R. Kelly	3:08
8.	"Shake Ya Body" (featuring Lil' Kim)	Carter; Kelly; Kim Jones; Barnes; Olivier	R. Kelly; Poke and Tone	3:19
9.	"Somebody's Girl"	Carter; Kelly; Barnes; Olivier	R. Kelly; Poke and Tone	3:41
10.	"Get This Money"	Carter; Kelly	R. Kelly; Tone^{[a]}	3:04
11.	"Shorty"	Carter; Kelly; Barnes; Olivier	R. Kelly; Poke and Tone	4:10
12.	"Honey"	Carter; Kelly; Barnes; Olivier; Maurice Gibb; Barry Gibb; Robin Gibb	R. Kelly; Poke and Tone	4:02
13.	"Pussy" (featuring Devin the Dude)	Carter; Kelly	Charlemagne	4:50

Notes

- ^{^[a]} signifies a co-producer

== Charts ==
=== Weekly charts ===
Chart (2002)	Peak position
Australian Albums (ARIA)	100
Austrian Albums (Ö3 Austria)	73
Belgian Albums (Ultratop Wallonia)	37
Canadian Albums (Nielsen SoundScan)	19
Canadian R&B Albums (Nielsen SoundScan)	7
Dutch Albums (Album Top 100)	12
French Albums (SNEP)	20
German Albums (Offizielle Top 100)	22
Swedish Albums (Sverigetopplistan)	42
Swiss Albums (Schweizer Hitparade)	18
UK Albums (OCC)	37
US Billboard 200	2
US Top R&B/Hip-Hop Albums (Billboard)	1

=== Year-end charts ===
Chart (2002)	Position
Canadian R&B Albums (Nielsen SoundScan)	54
Canadian Rap Albums (Nielsen SoundScan)	29
French Albums (SNEP)	147
US Billboard 200	99
US Top R&B/Hip-Hop Albums (Billboard)	15

== Certifications ==
Region	Certification	Certified units/sales
France (SNEP)	Gold	100,000^{*}
United States (RIAA)	Platinum	1,000,000^{^}
^{*} Sales figures based on certification alone.^{^} Shipments figures based on certification alone.
