= LeShay Tomlinson =

American actress

LeShay Tomlinson is an American actress, best known for her role as Cathy Longs in R. Kelly's hip hopera, Trapped in the Closet. Cathy is noteworthy as the woman whose tryst with Kelly's character sets in motion the many revelations and cliffhangers which provide the hip hopera's dramatic skeleton.

LeShay Tomlinson had filled small roles in a number of motion pictures prior to her work with R. Kelly; including the Princess Monique short "The Call" with Closet co-star Cat Wilson, folk music parody A Mighty Wind and the Brosnan/Hayek crime drama After the Sunset.

== Filmography ==
=== Film ===
Year	Title	Role	Notes
1999	Light It Up	Student	
2000	What Women Want	Marshall Field's Shopper	
2002	Business Unusual	Mary J. Dancer	Short film
2002	The Call	Yolanda	Short film
2003	A Mighty Wind	Steinbloom's Secretary	
2003	Buffoon	Wendy	Short film
2004	The Male Groupie	Lovely	Short film
2004	After the Sunset	Receptionist	
2005	Trapped in the Closet: Chapters 1–12	Cathy Longs	Short film; part of the series Trapped in the Closet
2006	Let Me Count the Ways	Brianna	
2006	Be the Man	Miriam	Short film
2007	Trapped in the Closet: Chapters 13–22	Cathy Longs	Short film
2007	Trapped in the Closet: The BIG Package	Cathy Longs	Short film (Chapters 1–22)
2007	The Lutheran	Slutty Mama	Short film
2008	Stitches	Claire	Short film
2008	Delayed		Voice role; short film
2009	Someone Heard My Cry	Kimberly	Short film
2010	The Company We Keep	Juanita	
2012	Wrong	Jogger	
2012	People Like Us	Attendant	
2012	C'mon Man	Peaches	
2012	Trapped in the Closet: The Next Installment	Cathy Longs	Short film (Chapters 23–33)
2014	Freeloader	Tonya	Short film
2018	The Watchers	Millie	Short film

=== Television ===
Year	Title	Role	Notes
2004	Drake & Josh	Irate girlfriend	Episode: "Mean Teacher"
2005–2012	Trapped in the Closet	Cathy Longs	Chapters 1–12, Chapters 13–22, The BIG Package (Chapters 1–22), and The Next Installment (Chapters 23–33)
2006	Eve	Brianna	Episode: "Rules of Engagement"
2007	Rx	Janice	TV film
2008	Wizards of Waverly Place	Passerby	Episode: "Alex's Spring Fling"
2009–2010	Lens on Talent	Claire	2 episodes
2014	Major Crimes	Receptionist	Episode: "Two Options"
2014	Pretty Little Liars	Nurse	Episode: "March of Crimes"
2017	Jane the Virgin	Director	2 episodes
2017	Doubt	Judge Rebecca Cannon	2 episodes
2017	Before I Got Famous	Casting Director	
2017	Insecure	Renee	2 episodes
2017	Shut Eye	Patient's Mom	Episode: "Short Changed"
2018	Henry Danger	Carolyn	Episode: "Budget Cuts"
2019	Trade Show Show	Handler	Episode: "Strap in Cuz It Ain't Gonna Be Pretty"

=== Web ===
Year	Title	Role	Notes
2019	Shook	Sandra	Main role
