= Rebecca Field =

American actress

- Born: June 19
- Education: Bridgewater State College (BA, MA)
- Occupation: Actress
- Years active: 2005–present

Rebecca Field is an American actress. She is best known for her role as Lacey Jean-Locklin in the Lifetime drama series The Client List, and as Bridget in Trapped in the Closet, the musical soap opera series by R. Kelly. She is also known for the role of Gail in the 2018 film A Star Is Born.

== Early years ==
Field is the daughter of Dennis Field and Ellen Mendel. She graduated from Bridgewater State College with a Bachelor of Arts in Theatre Arts and Communications and a Master of Arts degree. She gained additional training in acting as a child at the Berkshire Public Theatre and after college at the Circle in the Square Theatre in New York.

== Career ==
In her early career Field played minor roles in various television shows and movies, including Monk.

Field was cast in her first series regular role of Janet in the ABC short-lived television series October Road from 2007 to 2008. In R. Kelly's hip-hopera, also known as a hip-hop opera, Trapped in the Closet, she played the role of Bridget. In 2009, she played a recurring role as social worker Susan Winters alongside Jada Pinkett Smith in TNT's Hawthorne. Field has also made guest appearances on shows such as Dollhouse, Drop Dead Diva, Grey's Anatomy, The Mentalist, Lie to Me, Mike & Molly, Criminal Minds, CSI: Crime Scene Investigation, Castle, and Body of Proof.

From 2012 to 2013, Field played Lacey on The Client List starring Jennifer Love Hewitt, on Lifetime.

In 2018, Field won an audition for a cameo role in A Star Is Born as Gail, a concert assistant who welcomes Lady Gaga's character Ally to a performance at the Greek Theatre as the guest of Bradley Cooper's character, singer Jackson Maine. Field's smiling, put-together character, who also improvised some of her lines, was warmly received by film audiences.

== Filmography ==
=== Film ===
Year	Title	Role	Notes
2005	Trapped in the Closet: Chapters 1–12	Bridget	Video short; part of the series Trapped in the Closet
2007	The Metrosexual	Tonya the Escort	
2007	Trapped in the Closet: Chapters 13–22	Bridget	Video short
2007	Trapped in the Closet: The BIG Package	Bridget	Video short (Chapters 1–22)
2011	About Fifty	Michelle	
2012	American Reunion	Loni	
2012	Stuck	Terri	
2014	Horrible Bosses 2	Sex Addiction Group Member	
2018	Don't Worry, He Won't Get Far on Foot	Margie Bighew	
2018	A Star Is Born	Gail	
2020	Four Good Days	Coach Miller	

=== Television ===
Year	Title	Role	Notes
2005–2007	Trapped in the Closet	Bridget	Chapters 1–12, Chapters 13–22, and The BIG Package (Chapters 1–22)
2006	Mr. Nice Guy	Tara	TV series
2006	Monk	Gail	Episode: "Mr. Monk Bumps His Head"
2006	Mind of Mencia	Nerdy Girl	Episode: "2.4"
2007	ER	Psych Woman	Episode: "Lights Out"
2007–2008	October Road	Janet Meadows	Main role (19 episodes)
2008	The Game	Tina	Episode: "The Platski Thickens"
2009	The Game	Tina	Episode: "Truth and Consequences"
2009	Dollhouse	Kris	Episode: "True Believer"
2009	Drop Dead Diva	Lucy Tyner	Episode: "The 'F' Word"
2009	Lie to Me	Jenna Bynes	Episode: "Control Factor"
2009	Private Practice	Rachel Gold	Episode: "The Parent Trap"
2009	Hawthorne	Susan Winters	Episodes: "Pilot", "Trust Me", "No Guts, No Glory"
2010	Huge	Coco	TV series
2010	The Mentalist	Lucy Joel	Episode: "The Blood on His Hands"
2010	Mike & Molly	Jill	Episode: "Mike's New Boots"
2011	Criminal Minds	Jane Gould	Episode: "Today I Do"
2011	CSI: Crime Scene Investigation	Lisa Calgrove	Episode: "Turn On, Tune In, Drop Dead"
2011	Breakout Kings	Candace Plum	Episode: "The Bag Man"
2011	Hawthorne	Susan Winters	Episode: "Fight or Flight"
2012	Castle	Marilyn Kane	Episode: "Dial M for Mayor"
2012	Alcatraz	Kathy Callahan	Episode: "Kit Nelson"
2012	Body of Proof	Suzie Foster	Episode: "Identity"
2012–2013	The Client List	Lacey Jean-Locklin	Main role
2014	Grey's Anatomy	Sabine McNeil	Recurring Role
2015	NCIS: Los Angeles	Ginny	Episode: "Rage"
2016	Code Black	Lori Nicholson	Episode: "The Fifth Stage"
2016	Zoo	Gwen	Episode: "The Moon and the Star"
2017	Twin Peaks	Another Mom	Episode: "The Return, Part 7"
2018	Station 19	Hannah Sherwood	Episode: "Last day on Earth"
2018	Shameless	Eliza	Episode:
2019	The Resident	Susan Mitchka	Episode: "Choice words"
2019	The Rookie	Sarah Murphy	Episode: "Clean Cut"
2019	Unbelievable	Ms. Bell	Episode: "Episode 4"
2020	S.W.A.T.	Annabeth	Episode: "Animus"
2020	The Left Right Game		Episode: "Has Anyone Heard of The Left Right Game?"
2020–2023	All Rise	Carol Coleman	12 episodes
2021	Chicago Med	Mrs Miller	Episode: "Change Is a Tough Pill to Swallow"
2021	911 Lone Star	Joy	Episode: "Impulse Control"
2022	Gordita Chronicles	Valerie	Recurring Role
2025	The Residence	Emily Mackil	Recurring Role
2025	Ballard	Colleen Hatteras	Main Role
2025	Watson	Nurse Haven Henry	Episode: "Lucky"
2025	Tracker	Ruth Carter	Episode: "Angel"
