= TP.3 Reloaded =

Studio album by R. Kelly
- Released: July 5, 2005
- Recorded: September 2004–January 2005
- Length: 78:00
- Label: Jive
- Producers: R. Kelly; Scott Storch; Luny Tunes; Nely

R. Kelly chronology
Unfinished Business (2004)	TP.3 Reloaded (2005)	Double Up (2007)

Singles from TP-3: Reloaded
- 1. "In the Kitchen / Trapped in the Closet (Chapter 1)" Released: April 5, 2005; 2. "Playa's Only" Released: June 14, 2005; 3. "Slow Wind" Released: December 8, 2005; 4. "Burn It Up" Released: April 2006

TP.3 Reloaded (an abbreviation of Twelve Play.3) is the seventh studio album by American R&B singer R. Kelly. It was released by Jive Records on July 5, 2005, in the United States. The third installment in Kelly's 12 Play series, it includes the first five parts of the song "Trapped in the Closet". The album became his fifth number-one on the US Billboard 200 album chart, and sold more than 1.02 million copies within its first three months of release.

== Critical reception ==
Professional ratings
Aggregate scores
Source	Rating
Metacritic	60/100
Review scores
Source	Rating
AllMusic	2.5/5 stars
Entertainment Weekly	C−
The Guardian	3/5 stars
Los Angeles Times	1.5/4 stars
Pitchfork	7.4/10
PopMatters	8/10
Robert Christgau	(choice cut)
Rolling Stone	3.5/4 stars
USA Today	3.5/4 stars
Vibe	4/5 stars

TP.3 Reloaded received mixed reviews from critics. At Metacritic, which assigns a normalized rating out of 100 to reviews from mainstream critics, the album has an average score of 60 based on 18 reviews. Christian Hoard from Rolling Stone called the album a "return to form". He wrote that TP.3 Reloaded "shows how little Kelly has learned about life and how much he’s learned about hitmaking" and noted that it was "easy on the ears, a little ridiculous and enthralling all at once." Rob Mitchum from Pitchfork felt that TP3 Reloaded was "one of those albums where every song sounds like a radio single [...] Kelly cruises through genres like he's giving a guided tour, hitting crunk, dancehall, hip-hop, reggaeton, and naturally, a handful of bedroom ballads along the way. Production work is minimal, guest stars pay deference to their album host, and the entire album puts Kelly, his malleable voice, and his considerable persona center stage." Brian Sims from HipHopDX found that TP.3 Reloaded "presents a balanced R. Kelly, his artistic genius channeled through several genres, not overdone with just one."

Vibe remarked that "while the content is strictly sex obsessed, the range of musical styles here is as varied and satisfying as the many positions and places the album will take you." In his review for New York Times, Jon Pareles noted that "Kelly models his singing and songwriting on Stevie Wonder, Michael Jackson and especially Prince. But he is now the unquestioned master of the ultra-slow groove, where the beat turns into an inner throb as notes ooze and drip from his synthesizers." Billboard's Gail Mitchell felt that with ''TP.3 Reloaded, Kelly "doesn't break any new lyrical ground, but [his] talent for penning original, infectious grooves remains intact." Nathan Rabin from The A.V. Club wrote that TP.3 Reloaded "initially seems like a rote exercise in self-parody, then a delightful romp in self-parody, then finally something in between" and called it "intermittently fun but uneven." Stylus Magazine critic Thomas Inskeep declared the album "uneven by and large, and below what we all know R.’s capable of, this one mostly shoots blanks."

AllMusic editor Andy Kellman gave the album two and a half stars out of five and wrote: "Thematically opposite to Happy People/U Saved Me. the first hour of TP.3 is mostly about getting rowdy and getting it on, full of some of the clumsiest and lewdest lyrics Kelly has written, a few of which are extreme enough to be parody-proof [..] With one or two exceptions, all of these songs are second and third rate by his standard." Similarly, Entertainment Weekly's Raymond Fiore found that "Kelly descends into pitiful self-parody on his seventh solo album. You’ve heard it all before [...] Unless you’re intrigued by a cramp-afflicted Kelly doing the nasty, listen at your own peril." Los Angeles Times critic Richard Cromelin noted that "some of the up-tempo tracks are infectious, and the burbling ballads have a lush sensuality, but Kelly’s whole approach is familiar and threadbare." Keith Harris, writing for The Village Voice found that "only a true beat-whore could groove along complacently to TP.3," while Sal Cinquemani from Slant Magazine called the album some "epic piece of crap."

== Commercial performance ==
TP.3 Reloaded debuted at number one on the US Billboard 200, with first weeks sales of 491,000 copies. It was Kelly's fifth album to top the chart as well as his ninth number one on Billboard's Top R&B/Hip-Hop Albums list. On August 8, 2005, the album was certified Gold and Platinum by the Recording Industry Association of America (RIAA). By October 2005, TP.3 Reloaded had sold 1.02 million copies in the US, according to Nielsen Soundscan.

== Track listing ==
All tracks produced by R. Kelly; except "Playa's Only" produced by Scott Storch, and "Burn It Up" produced by Luny Tunes and co-produced by R. Kelly.

No.	Title	Writer(s)	Length
1.	"Playa's Only" (featuring The Game)	Scott Storch, R. Kelly, Jayceon Taylor	3:54
2.	"Happy Summertime" (featuring Snoop Dogg)	R. Kelly, Calvin Broadus	3:38
3.	"In the Kitchen"	R. Kelly	3:37
4.	"Slow Wind"	R. Kelly	3:21
5.	"Put My T-Shirt On"	R. Kelly	4:30
6.	"Remote Control"	R. Kelly	5:19
7.	"Kickin' It with Your Girlfriend"	R. Kelly	3:34
8.	"Reggae Bump Bump" (featuring Elephant Man)	R. Kelly, O'Neil Bryan	5:21
9.	"Touchin'" (featuring Nivea)	R. Kelly	5:00
10.	"Girls Go Crazy" (featuring Baby)	R. Kelly, Bryan Williams	4:29
11.	"Hit It Till the Mornin'" (featuring Twista and Do or Die)	R. Kelly, Carl Terrell Mitchell, Dennis Round, Darnell Smith	4:18
12.	"Sex Weed"	R. Kelly	4:25
13.	"(Sex) Love Is What We Makin'"	R. Kelly	3:37
14.	"Burn It Up" (featuring Wisin & Yandel)	R. Kelly, Luny Tunes, Wisin & Yandel	3:51
15.	"Trapped in the Closet Chapter 1"	R. Kelly	3:25
16.	"Trapped in the Closet Chapter 2"	R. Kelly	3:15
17.	"Trapped in the Closet Chapter 3"	R. Kelly	3:15
18.	"Trapped in the Closet Chapter 4"	R. Kelly	3:15
19.	"Trapped in the Closet Chapter 5"	R. Kelly	3:19

== Charts ==
=== Weekly charts ===
Weekly chart performance for TP.3 Reloaded
Chart (2005)	Peak position
Australian Albums (ARIA)	41
Australian Urban Albums (ARIA)	10
Austrian Albums (Ö3 Austria)	75
Belgian Albums (Ultratop Flanders)	56
Belgian Albums (Ultratop Wallonia)	38
Dutch Albums (Album Top 100)	19
French Albums (SNEP)	21
German Albums (Offizielle Top 100)	26
Scottish Albums (Official Charts)	79
Swedish Albums (Sverigetopplistan)	48
Swiss Albums (Schweizer Hitparade)	30
UK Albums (Official Charts)	23
UK R&B Albums (Official Charts)	3
US Billboard 200	1
US Top R&B/Hip-Hop Albums (Billboard)	1
US Top Rap Albums (Billboard)	1

=== Year-end charts ===
Year-end chart performance for TP.3 Reloaded
Chart (2005)	Position
US Billboard 200	49
US Top R&B/Hip-Hop Albums (Billboard)	14

== Certifications ==
Certifications and sales for TP.3 Reloaded
Region	Certification	Certified units/sales
United Kingdom (BPI)	Silver	60,000^{^}
United States (RIAA)	Platinum	1,020,000
^{^} Shipments figures based on certification alone.
