= Don't Let Me Die =

2004 single by Jay-Z and R. Kelly

Single by Jay-Z and R. Kelly

from the album Unfinished Business
- Released: October 26, 2004
- Studio: The Chocolate Factory and Rock Land Studios (Chicago); Baseline Recording Studios (New York City)
- Genre: Hip hop; R&B
- Length: 4:51
- Label: Roc-A-Fella; Def Jam; Rockland
- Songwriter(s): Shawn Carter; Robert Kelly; Samuel Barnes; Jean-Claude Olivier; Alexander Mosley
- Producer(s): Tone; R. Kelly; Spanador (co.)

Jay-Z singles chronology
"Big Chips" (2004)	"Don't Let Me Die" (2004)	"Numb/Encore" (2004)

R. Kelly singles chronology
"Big Chips" (2004)	"Don't Let Me Die" (2004)	"In the Kitchen" (2005)

"Don't Let Me Die" is a song by American rapper Jay-Z and American singer R. Kelly. It is the second single from their collaboration album Unfinished Business (2004). The song was produced by Tone of the Trackmasters and Kelly, with co-production from Alexander "Spanador" Mosley.

== Critical reception ==
Tom Breihan of Pitchfork wrote that the song's gospel choir, which he described as "bazonkers", was one of the better aspects of the Trackmasters' "clean" sound throughout Unfinished Business. Nathan Rabin of The A.V. Club wrote the song "amplifies the disc's abundant cheese to operatic levels, complete with a choir and an unhinged Kelly vocal".

== In popular culture ==
In the 2013 film G.I. Joe: Retaliation, Roadblock invokes Jay-Z's lyrics from the song: "Whatever deity guides my life / Dear Lord, don't let me die tonight".

== Charts ==
Chart (2004)	Peak position
U.S. Bubbling Under Hot 100	24
U.S. Billboard Hot R&B/Hip-Hop Songs	58
U.S. Billboard Rhythmic Top 40	34

== Release history ==
Region	Date	Format(s)	Label(s)	Ref.
United States	October 4, 2004	Rhythmic contemporary · urban contemporary radio	Jive, Roc-A-Fella, IDJMG	
