= Eric Lane (actor) =

American actor

- Born: November 16, 1976 (age 49); Chicago, Illinois, U.S.
- Occupation: Actor
- Years active: 2000–present

Eric Lane (born November 16, 1976) is an American actor from Chicago, Illinois. He is known for appearing in R. Kelly's hip-hopera Trapped in the Closet as the character Twan, from "Chapter 4" and onward.

Among his early roles was in a co-starring role in the 2000 independent film One Week, where he played Tyco, an AIDS victim.

He also appeared in the 2006 film Waist Deep, portrayed the lead role in the 2008 direct-to-video film Tactical, and the main character in the 2014 short film Night Thrasher: RAVE based on the Marvel comics superhero character of the same name. He had a brief recurring role as Drop in Season 3 of Empire.

He played the role of Black Magnum in the Amazon Prime Video film The Girls & Rodney, as well as the character Frank the Barber in the comedy series Rel on FOX. He also starred in a 2023 series Kold x Windy.
