= Song Cry =

2002 single by Jay-Z

Single by Jay-Z

from the album The Blueprint
- Released: April 16, 2002
- Recorded: April 2001
- Genre: Hip hop; chipmunk soul
- Length: 5:03
- Label: Roc-A-Fella; Def Jam
- Songwriters: Shawn Carter; Douglas Gibbs; Randolph Johnson; Justin Smith
- Producer: Just Blaze

Jay-Z singles chronology
"Jigga That Nigga" (2002)	"Song Cry" (2002)	"Guess Who's Back" (2002)

Music video
- "Song Cry" on YouTube

"Song Cry" is a song by American rapper Jay-Z and produced by Just Blaze. Released on April 16, 2002, it was the fourth and final single from his sixth studio album The Blueprint and also appears on the 2001 live album Jay-Z: Unplugged.

"Song Cry" was nominated for the Grammy Award for Best Male Rap Solo Performance but lost to "Hot in Herre" by Nelly. The song samples Bobby Glenn's "Sounds Like a Love Song".

== Background and content ==
In an interview with Bill Maher, Jay-Z stated that this song was actually inspired by three different relationships he had in the past, and he wrote about his different experiences all together in different verses.

The song is a slow and quiet melodic rap ballad in which Jay-Z laments the break-up of an earlier relationship due to his own neglect and infidelity. Admitting that he is too prideful to publicly display his emotions ("I can't see 'em coming down my eyes"), Jay-Z forces the song to "cry" instead. This allows Jay-Z to mourn the break-up free of any damage to his masculine image as a street hustler. This furthers the notion that emotional vulnerability is a sign of weakness, especially within the Black community, as Black men in particular suppress vulnerability "in order to survive."

== Live performances ==
The live performance of "Song Cry" from Jay-Z's 2001 MTV Unplugged album features female vocalist Jaguar Wright singing a sample of "Sounds Like a Love Song" by Bobby Glenn, though Wright is not identified in the liner notes of the album.

During his 2006 Water for Life Tour, Jay-Z performed "Song Cry" at the Royal Albert Hall, the venue's first ever hip hop show. American actress Gwyneth Paltrow did the chorus.

The song was also included on the set-lists of his all-stadium tours On the Run Tour in 2014 and OTR II in 2018, both with co-headliner and wife Beyoncé.

== Credits and personnel ==
The credits for "Song Cry" are adapted from the liner notes of The Blueprint.

Studio locations

- Mastered at Masterdisk, New York City, New York.
- Mixed and recorded at Baseline Studios, New York City, New York.

Personnel

- Jay-Z – songwriting, vocals (The female singer singing the hook is uncredited)
- Just Blaze – production, songwriting
- Douglas Gibbs – songwriting
- Ralph Johnson – songwriting
- Young Guru – recording
- Shane Woodley – recording assistant
- Jason Goldstein – mixing
- Tony Dawsey – mastering

Samples

- "Song Cry" contains samples of "Sounds Like a Love Song", as performed by Bobby Glenn and written by Douglas Gibbs and Ralph Johnson.

== Charts ==
Chart (2002)	Peak position
US Hot R&B/Hip-Hop Songs (Billboard)	45
US Hot Rap Songs (Billboard)	25

== Certifications ==
Certifications for "Song Cry"
Region	Certification	Certified units/sales
United States (RIAA)	Gold	500,000^{‡}
^{‡} Sales+streaming figures based on certification alone.

== See also ==
- List of songs recorded by Jay-Z
