= Unfinished Business (Jay-Z and R. Kelly album) =

Studio album by Jay-Z and R. Kelly
- Released: October 26, 2004
- Recorded: 2001–2004
- Studios: The Chocolate Factory and Rock Land Studios (Chicago); Baseline Recording Studios (New York City)
- Genres: Hip-hop; R&B
- Length: 44:34
- Labels: Roc-A-Fella; Rockland; Def Jam; Jive
- Producers: R. Kelly; Trackmasters; Alexander Mosley

Jay-Z and R. Kelly chronology
| The Best of Both Worlds (2002) | Unfinished Business (2004) |

Jay-Z chronology
| The Black Album (2003) | Unfinished Business (2004) | Collision Course (2004) |

R. Kelly chronology
| Happy People/U Saved Me (2004) | Unfinished Business (2004) | TP.3 Reloaded (2005) |

Singles from Unfinished Business
- 1. "Big Chips" Released: October 19, 2004; 2. "Don't Let Me Die" Released: October 26, 2004

Holographic cover
- The cover reflects the front perspective of the hologram

Unfinished Business is the second and final collaboration album between American rapper Jay-Z and American singer R. Kelly. The album was released worldwide on October 26, 2004. It was distributed in the United States and Canada by Jive Records and Island Def Jam Music Group, by the Bertelsmann Music Group (BMG) and its subsidiary Jive Records, except in Canada and the United States of America where Island Def Jam Music Group and its labels Def Jam Recordings and Roc-A-Fella Records replaced BMG. R. Kelly's label Rockland Records was also involved in the album. The album was composed of unreleased tracks from the recording sessions of 2002's The Best of Both Worlds, although slight additions were made.

The album was promoted by the "Best of Both Worlds" concert tour with R. Kelly and Jay-Z performing songs from both their solo and joint albums. The "Best of Both Worlds" tour filled with tension and accusations that boiled over at an October 31 show where R. Kelly was accused of erratic behavior and was pepper sprayed by a Jay-Z associate. Jay-Z and the tour promoter then banned R. Kelly from the tour claiming "lack of professionalism". R. Kelly responded by suing his co-act and touring company for $75 million for breach of contract, among other things, on November 2.

Unfinished Business was supported by two singles: "Big Chips" and "Don't Let Me Die". They were both sent to radio stations, but only the former saw a physical release. Like its predecessor, the album was criticized for repetitive lyrics but was a commercial success. It debuted at number one on the US Billboard 200 chart, selling 215,000 copies in its first week, and later was certified platinum by the Recording Industry Association of America (RIAA) in December 2004.

== Background ==
R. Kelly appeared on Jay-Z's "Guilty Until Proven Innocent". In 2001, Jay-Z was featured on R. Kelly's popular single "Fiesta Remix" that shot up to fifth on the Billboard Top 100. The positive reception to both songs opened dialog between the two for a possible joint album. In December 2001, R. Kelly confirmed the album's existence and name in an interview with MTV at that year's Billboard Music Awards. In January 2002, the two announced Best of Both Worlds in a New York City news conference. When the album was leaked on February 22, the release date was moved up seven days to combat piracy. Outside parties speculated that the album would be the biggest release of the year and easily sell multi-million. However, in February 2002, an unknown person sent a sex tape to the Chicago Sun-Times newspaper, claiming that it was R. Kelly and an underage female. This would be illegal under Illinois law, which states that adults cannot have sexual intercourse with a minor. R. Kelly denied the claims. In response to the public outrage, Def Jam cut all promotion plans of the album, including music videos and the planned tour. Jay-Z also refused to appear with R. Kelly in anything.

Best of Both Worlds was criticized by critics for uninspired and recycled song meanings. It debuted number–two on the Billboard 200 with 223,000 units scanned. Despite the lack of promotion, it was still considered a commercial failure; the total was less than half of the artists' last solo efforts. Jay-Z's The Blueprint and R. Kelly's TP-2.com sold 427,000 and 543,000 respectively in their debut week and debuted number–one. If any chances of doing a tour lingered, they were crushed in June when R. Kelly was arrested for 21 counts of child pornography after witnesses claimed the woman in the video was 14 years old. He was later acquitted of all charges in 2008.

In November 2003, R. Kelly appeared at Jay-Z's "farewell" concert that was featured in the 2004 documentary film Fade to Black. The response from the crowd led to two to reconsider the idea of touring again, noting how R. Kelly's studio album that year, Chocolate Factory was certified multi-platinum by the RIAA. After watching Kelly get back on top, keep his fanbase, and go platinum in only 3 weeks, Jay-Z and Def Jam jumped back on the bandwagon. On September 21, Unfinished Business was confirmed.

== Recording ==
As the album is composed of unreleased tracks of R. Kelly and Jay-Z, the recording took place during the Best of Both Worlds recording sessions. The two never met in a studio, instead sending tracks to each other to finish. Jay-Z described the process in their Best of Both Worlds press conference.

"It was definitely a friendly competition. He'd send me something and I'd be like, 'Oh, he killed that. Now I've got to kill it, too.' And every time I sent him something, he'd be like, 'Maaaannnn. All you've got to do is rap. I've got to put it in perfect pitch and harmony and still be saying something. You're putting pressure on me."

R. Kelly in a 2001 MTV interview stated that they had recorded nine songs by December 10. Album producers Tone and Poke also made sure the songs moved along.

== Best of Both Worlds Tour (Jay-Z and R. Kelly) ==
The Best of Both Worlds Tour
- Tour by Jay-Z and R. Kelly
- Associated album: The Best of Both Worlds; Unfinished Business
- Start date: September 29, 2004
- End date: October 29, 2004 (was scheduled to last through November 28)
- No. of shows: 24 (40 shows were planned)

R. Kelly concert chronology
- The Key in the Ignition Tour (2003); The Best of Both Worlds Tour (2004); The Light It Up Tour (2006)

The Best of Both Worlds Tour was a United States-only, 40-city tour to promote Unfinished Business, headlined by Jay-Z and R. Kelly. Artists affiliated with Roc-A-Fella performed with Jay-Z during his solo sets. It was sponsored by Atlanta Worldwide Touring. The tour was originally planned for 2002, but was scrapped after the R. Kelly accusations surfaced. It was originally announced on August 19, 2004, with initial tour dates coming on August 27. The remaining shows were announced on October 6. The concert was expected to gross $30 million.

Although the concert was well received by critics, they noticed tension between R. Kelly and Jay-Z. The two only performed together on stage for the beginning and finale sets. Sean Daly of The Washington Post wrote on their interactions, "Did any of it look remotely genuine? Absolutely not. How about "As the Best of Both Worlds Turn?".

To help promote voting in the upcoming presidential election in the United States, Jay-Z used the tour dates in Ohio to register eligible voters using his organization Voice Your Choice and music executive Russell Simmons' Hip-Hop Summit Action Network.

=== Concert synopsis ===
The concerts began with a video depicting a news report high-speed police chase of two buses heading to the arena. At the climax, the arena is darkened and the two vehicles crash and break a faux-wall on the stage. From there, R. Kelly and Jay-Z exit their respective vehicles clad in white suits and perform "The Best of Both Worlds", "Shake Ya Body", "Take You Home With Me A.K.A. Body", and "Somebody's Girl" from the Best of Both Worlds album. R. Kelly then goes backstage while Jay-Z and his entourage perform their set. From there, the two transition with 10 to 20 minute sets consisting of their songs. After about five, they then conclude with the songs "Fiesta Remix", "Big Chips" and "Hell Yeah".

=== Controversy ===
During the first Rosemont concert, R. Kelly ran a skit that made light of his court case. Due to national outrage, he removed the act from the second concert. For reasons both Jay-Z and R. Kelly dispute, Kelly was more than two hours late for the next day's concert that ended at 1 AM—and, to make matters worse, R. Kelly left before the final joint set. The tour was unable to make it to Cincinnati, Ohio, for the next concert and was therefore canceled. On October 17, Jay-Z left early to attend to an emergency, but was later seen at the R&B singer Usher's birthday party. R. Kelly stopped his set midway through the October 23 St. Louis concert for difficulty with the lighting. The Milwaukee and Hartford shows were canceled for technical difficulties.

The tension boiled over in New York City's Madison Square Garden on Friday, October 29 when R. Kelly told the audience that two men were showing their guns to him. Although various media reports dispute the actual time of the disturbance, it is presumed to be near the beginning to an hour into R. Kelly's set. Madison Square Garden security then searched the area but found nothing and gave clearance for R. Kelly and his bodyguards to return. On their walk back, they were suddenly pepper-sprayed by Tyran "Ty Ty" Smith, a childhood friend of Jay-Z and rushed to nearby Saint Vincent's Catholic Medical Center. By this time Jay-Z was performing onstage in place of R. Kelly, unaware of the backstage violence. After a 45-minute set, he told the crowd he would have a show for them in a few minutes. Jay-Z returned with several musicians in the crowd Usher, Mary J. Blige, and rappers Foxy Brown, Ja Rule, T.I., P. Diddy and his Roc-A-Fella entourage.

=== Aftermath ===
Following the show, both Jay-Z and R. Kelly interviewed separately with New York City radio station WQHT personality Angie Martinez. Jay-Z mocked R. Kelly's claims of a gun in the audience, saying, ""That's Madison Square Garden. You cannot get a gun in Madison Square Garden. Does he know where he's at?" He also confirmed the rumors of their strained relationship and called R. Kelly insecure about his louder reception at concerts and being over-concerned about stage lighting. Although R. Kelly confessed that he had not actually seen any guns, he was cautious after a threatening phone call earlier Friday. He also expressed his desire to perform at Saturday's show. The next day, Madison Square Garden banned R. Kelly and his group from that night's show, and Atlantic Worldwide Touring banned R. Kelly from the rest of the tour, which was renamed Jay-Z and Friends.

After a statement detailing his disappointment at being barred, R. Kelly sued Jay-Z, Atlantic Worldwide, and his production company Marcy Projects on the next day (November 1) for breach of contract and $75 million in damages ($60 million in punitive damages and $15 million for lost income) as a result of not being able to tour. The suit alleged that lighting problems caused by Jay-Z's production staff had been plaguing his performances since rehearsals in September and had to resort to fixing them himself or hiring a professional. It also accused Jay-Z of being jealous of the 60/40 split R. Kelly had over the tour gross and thus conspired the events that occurred at Madison Square Garden pressured Atlantic Worldwide to remove him.

Jay-Z countersued in January 2005, claiming R. Kelly showed erratic behavior that included: being periodically late or absent from meetings and rehearsals, missing deadlines for material, and sudden demands and requests that led to several concert delays and cancellations that resulted in loss of gross. R. Kelly's lawyers challenged it as "inaccurate smears of Mr. Kelly that are utterly irrelevant to the issues of the case". They further claimed it didn't deny that the rapper refused to work with R. Kelly after the Madison Square Garden incident and thus broke the contract. It was ultimately thrown out by a judge in May 2005, who agreed.

Jay-Z referenced R. Kelly's lawsuit on a remix of the 2004 hip-hop song, "Drop It Like It's Hot".

These niggas givin' out cases like a liquor store
Runnin' to the DA tryin' to get me for it
All the money it made, I'm like forget the law
I'm not 'fr-iz-aid, it J-iz-ay homie you got pl-iz-ayed
Take it like a man, the flow ran you off the st-iz-age (go sit down)
Wastin' ya time tryin' to sue S Dot tell ya lawyer
Take that civil case and drop it like it's hot

Ty Smith was arrested and charged with third-degree assault, which carried one year of prison, on November 12 for the pepper-spraying incident. In November 2005, R. Kelly filed another lawsuit against Jay-Z, claiming Smith was awarded with vice president of Def Jam's artist and repertoire. Regardless, he pleaded guilty to disorderly conduct in 2006 in a plea deal that contained no jail time.

=== Tour dates ===
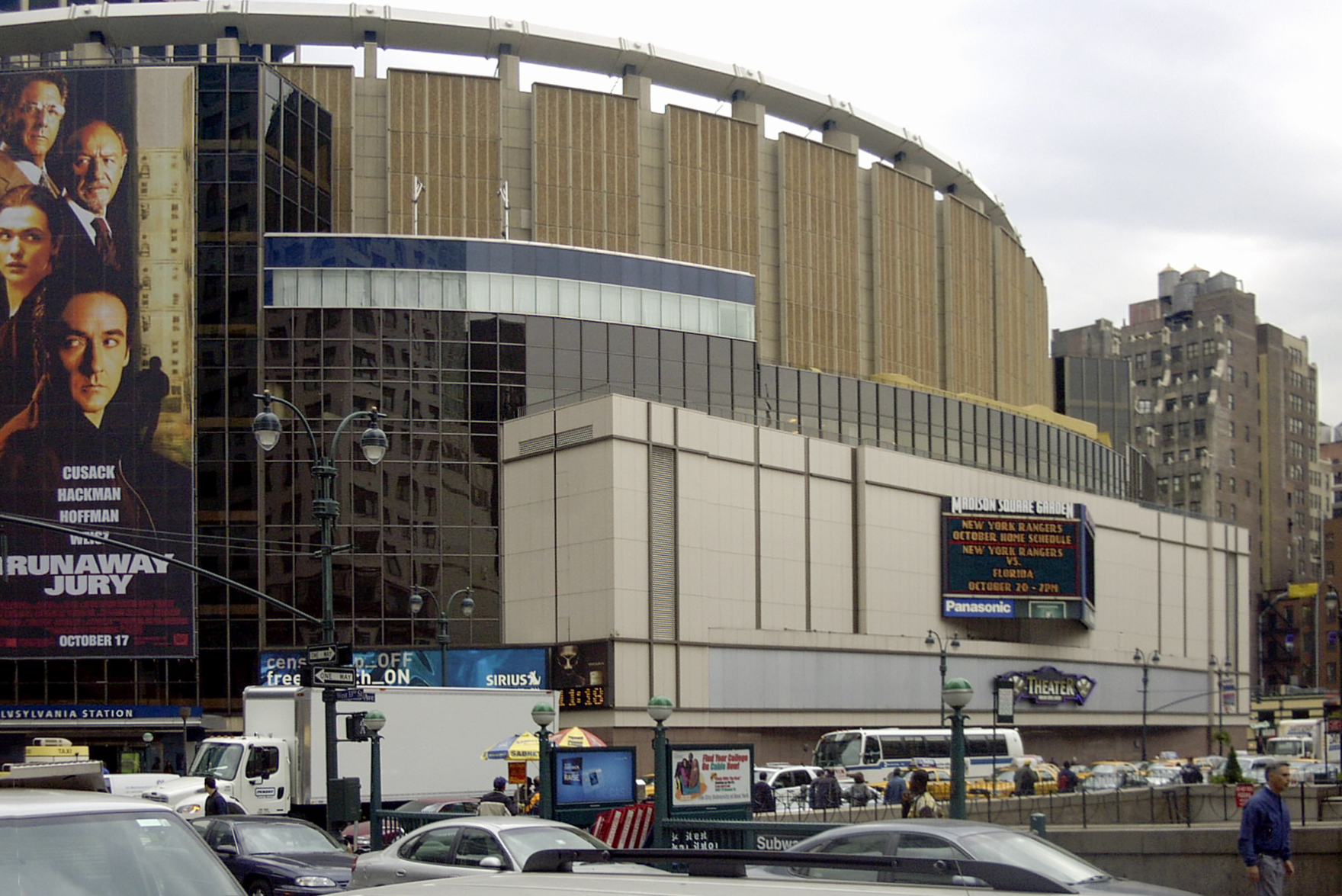
The exterior of Madison Square Garden, where the last show took place on October 29.

| Date | City | Country | Venue |
|---|---|---|---|
| September 29, 2004 | Rosemont | United States | Allstate Arena |
| September 30, 2004 | Rosemont | United States | Allstate Arena |
| October 1, 2004 | Cincinnati | United States | U.S. Bank Arena |
| October 2, 2004 | Columbus | United States | Value City Arena |
| October 3, 2004 | Cleveland | United States | CSU Convocation Center |
| October 5, 2004 | Buffalo | United States | HSBC Arena |
| October 7, 2004 | Washington, D.C. | United States | MCI Center |
| October 8, 2004 | Baltimore | United States | 1st Mariner Arena |
| October 9, 2004 | Greensboro | United States | Greensboro Coliseum |
| October 10, 2004 | Nashville | United States | Gaylord Entertainment Center |
| October 13, 2004 | Dallas | United States | American Airlines Center |
| October 14, 2004 | New Orleans | United States | New Orleans Arena |
| October 15, 2004 | Houston | United States | Toyota Center |
| October 16, 2004 | Oklahoma City | United States | Ford Center |
| October 17, 2004 | Memphis | United States | FedExForum |
| October 19, 2004 | Minneapolis | United States | Target Center |
| October 21, 2004 | North Little Rock | United States | Alltel Arena |
| October 22, 2004 | Birmingham | United States | Birmingham-Jefferson Arena |
| October 23, 2004 | St. Louis | United States | Savvis Center |
| October 24, 2004 | Milwaukee | United States | Bradley Center |
| October 26, 2004 | Hartford | United States | Hartford Civic Center |
| October 28, 2004 | Uniondale | United States | Nassau Veterans Memorial Coliseum |
| October 29, 2004 | New York City | United States | Madison Square Garden |

== Critical reception ==
Professional ratings
Review scores
| Source | Rating |
|---|---|
| AllHipHop | 3/5 stars |
| AllMusic | 1.5/5 stars |
| Entertainment Weekly | C |
| HipHopDX | 2.5/5 |
| Now | 3/5 Ns |
| Pitchfork | (6.7/10) |
| RapReviews | (7.0/10) |
| Rolling Stone | 2.5/5 stars |
| USA Today | 2/4 stars |

The album received mixed reviews from critics whom criticized the album for having the same theme as their previous outing and accused both artists of a cheap cash–in to promote their tour. Jon Caramanica of the Rolling Stone criticized Jay-Z's raps as boring. RapReviews's Steve Juon judged the album as a tolerable release, saying "this time R. Kelly's peanut butter R&B is actually de-emphasized a little in favor of Jay-Z's hip-hop chocolate. That's fine by me, because it tastes better that way. Not as good as an unrestrained and unfettered Jay-Z does by himself mind you, but it's an improvement."

== Commercial performance ==
Unfinished Business debuted at number one on the US Billboard 200 chart, selling 215,000 copies in its first week. This became Jay-Z’s seventh US number one album and R. Kelly's fourth. In its second week, the album dropped to number ten on the chart, selling an additional 71,000 copies. On December 1, 2004, the album was certified platinum by the Recording Industry Association of America (RIAA) for shipments of over one million copies in the United States.

== Track listing ==
| No. | Title | Writer(s) | Producer(s) | Length |
|---|---|---|---|---|
| 1. | "The Return" | R. Kelly; S. Carter; S. Barnes; A. Mosley; K. Fareed; W. Irvine; A. Muhammad-Jones; M. Taylor; D. Davis; R. Walters | Tone; Alexander "Spanador" Mosley^{[a]} | 3:53 |
| 2. | "Big Chips" | R. Kelly; S. Carter; S. Barnes; J.C. Olivier | Poke and Tone; Alexander "Spanador" Mosley^{[a]} | 4:43 |
| 3. | "We Got 'Em Goin'" (featuring Memphis Bleek) | R. Kelly; S. Carter; M. Cox | Tone; R. Kelly | 4:00 |
| 4. | "She's Coming Home with Me" | R. Kelly; S. Carter; S. Barnes; J.C. Olivier; A. Mosley | Poke and Tone; Alexander "Spanador" Mosley^{[a]} | 3:49 |
| 5. | "Feelin' You in Stereo" | R. Kelly; S. Carter | R. Kelly | 3:42 |
| 6. | "Stop" (featuring Foxy Brown) | R. Kelly; S. Carter; S. Barnes; I. Marchand | Tone | 4:22 |
| 7. | "Mo' Money" (featuring Twista) | R. Kelly; S. Carter; S. Barnes; C. Mitchell | Tone | 4:08 |
| 8. | "Pretty Girls" | R. Kelly; S. Carter | Tone; R. Kelly | 3:34 |
| 9. | "Break Up (That's All We Do)" | R. Kelly; S. Carter; S. Barnes; T. Bell; L. Creed; K. Gamble | Tone | 4:31 |
| 10. | "Don't Let Me Die" | R. Kelly; S. Carter; S. Barnes; J.C. Olivier; A. Mosley | Tone; R. Kelly; Alexander "Spanador" Mosley^{[a]} | 4:51 |
| 11. | "The Return (Remix)" (featuring Slick Rick and Doug E. Fresh) | R. Kelly; S. Carter; R. Walters; D. Davis; S. Barnes; A. Mosley | Tone; Alexander "Spanador" Mosley^{[a]} | 2:58 |

Notes

- ^{^[a]} signifies a co-producer

== Personnel ==
- Art direction and design: Akisia Grigsby
- Bass: Donnie Lyle
- Choir and chorus: Lee Alexander, Johan Carlson, Yvonne Gage, Pastor Chris Harris Sr., Jeffrey W. Morrow, Kendall D. Nesbitt, Armirris Palmore, Lauren Pilot, Faith Howard & Robin E. Robinson
- Digital editing: Furius Styles
- Engineering and programming: Abel Garibaldi, Andy Gallas, Gimel Keaton, Ian Mereness, Steve Bearsley, Jason Mlodzinski, Nathan Wheeler
- Executive producers: Shawn Carter, Robert Kelly, Samuel Barnes
- Featuring vocals from: Memphis Bleek (Roc-A-Fella, Def Jam), Foxy Brown (Roc-A-Fella, Def Jam), Doug E. Fresh (Gee Street Independent, Island, PolyGram), Slick Rick (Def Jam) and Twista (Atlantic)
- Guitar: Donnie Lyle
- Keyboards: Big Mac, Kendall D. Nesbitt, Rodney East
- Logo design: Noah McDonough
- Mixing: Jason Goldstein, Tony Maserati, Supa Engineer "Duro"
- Mastering: Chris Athens
- Photography: Jonathan Mannion
- Producers: Samuel Barnes, Robert Kelly, Jean-Claude Olivier

== Charts ==
=== Weekly charts ===
| Chart (2004) | Peak position |
|---|---|
| Australian Albums (ARIA) | 198 |
| Canadian Albums (Nielsen SoundScan) | 14 |
| Canadian R&B Albums (Nielsen SoundScan) | 12 |
| Dutch Albums (Album Top 100) | 60 |
| French Albums (SNEP) | 68 |
| German Albums (Offizielle Top 100) | 77 |
| Swiss Albums (Schweizer Hitparade) | 65 |
| UK Albums (Official Charts) | 61 |
| UK R&B Albums (Official Charts) | 3 |
| US Billboard 200 | 1 |
| US Top R&B/Hip-Hop Albums (Billboard) | 1 |

=== Year-end charts ===
| Chart (2004) | Position |
|---|---|
| US Top R&B/Hip-Hop Albums (Billboard) | 70 |

== Certifications ==
| Region | Certification | Certified units/sales |
|---|---|---|
| United States (RIAA) | Platinum | 1,000,000^{^} |
^{^} Shipments figures based on certification alone.

== See also ==
- Best of Both Worlds
