= Big Chips =

2004 single by R. Kelly and Jay-Z

Single by R. Kelly and Jay-Z

from the album Unfinished Business
- Released: October 19, 2004
- Recorded: 2001–04
- Genre: Hip hop; R&B
- Length: 4:43
- Label: Roc-A-Fella; Def Jam; Rockland
- Songwriters: Shawn Carter; Robert Kelly; Sam Barnes
- Producers: Poke and Tone; Alexander Mosley

R. Kelly singles chronology
"U Saved Me" (2004)	"Big Chips" (2004)	"Don't Let Me Die" (2004)

Jay-Z singles chronology
"Storm" (2004)	"Big Chips" (2004)	"Don't Let Me Die" (2004)

"Big Chips" is a 2004 song by R&B singer R. Kelly and rapper Jay-Z. It was also co-written by the song producers, Poke and Tone and Alexander Mosley. It was released in late 2004 as the lead single from Unfinished Business. It peaked at number 39 on the Billboard Hot 100 on November 13. It is a hip hop and a R&B song.

== Track listing ==
CD Single

1. Big Chips (Radio)
2. Big Chips (Instrumental)
3. Big Chips (Call-Out)

Vinyl 12"

1. A1 Big Chips (Radio)
2. A2 Big Chips (LP)
3. A3 Big Chips (Instrumental)
4. B1 Don't Let Me Die (Radio)
5. B2 Don't Let Me Die (LP)
6. B3 Don't Let Me Die (Instrumental)

== Charts ==
=== Weekly charts ===
Chart	Peak position
U.S. Billboard Hot 100	39
U.S. Billboard Hot R&B/Hip-Hop Songs	17
U.S. Billboard Hot Rap Tracks	14
U.S. Billboard Rhythmic Top 40	17
U.S. Billboard Hot 100 Airplay	39
U.S. Billboard Hot R&B/Hip-Hop Airplay	16

== Release history ==
Region	Date	Format(s)	Label(s)	Ref.
United States	October 4, 2004	Rhythmic contemporary · urban contemporary radio	Jive, Roc-A-Fella, IDJMG	
