= Trapped in the Closet (Chapter 1) =

"Trapped in the Closet, Chapter 1"

Single by R. Kelly

from the album TP.3 Reloaded and Trapped in the Closet 1–12
- B-side: "In the Kitchen"
- Released: April 5, 2005
- Recorded: 2004
- Genre: R&B; rap opera
- Length: 3:30
- Label: Jive
- Songwriter(s): Robert Kelly
- Producer(s): R. Kelly

R. Kelly singles chronology
| "In the Kitchen" (2005) | "Trapped in the Closet, Chapter 1" (2005) | "Playa's Only" (2005) |

"Trapped in the Closet (Chapter 1 of 5)" is an R&B song written and produced by American singer R. Kelly for his seventh studio album TP.3 Reloaded. It was released in early 2005 as the album's lead single together with "In the Kitchen". The song is also featured on the soundtrack of the film inspired by the song "Trapped in the Closet 1–12". VH1 ranked it #41 on its list of the "100 Greatest Songs of the '00s".

== Content and music video ==
The first chapter of "Trapped in the Closet" begins with the narrator, Sylvester (portrayed by Kelly), waking up and realizing that he is not in his own bed. He recalls leaving a nightclub with a strange woman the previous night, and that he was in her bed. As Sylvester is scolding himself for what he has done as a married man, the woman comes back into the bedroom from the bathroom. Sylvester tells her that he has to leave quickly. She tells him he can't leave out the door because she hears her husband coming up the stairs. Sylvester says he'll jump out the window, but she reminds him that they are on the fifth floor. Sylvester thinks frantically, and then decides to hide in the closet. A few seconds later, the husband walks in, and the couple ends up fooling around on the bed. Sylvester reflects that the woman deserves an Oscar for her skillful acting. Suddenly, Sylvester's cell phone rings and he hurries to put it on vibrate. The husband hears the ring and suspects something is wrong. He searches the house for another person. He looks behind the shower curtain, under the bed, in the dresser, and then walks towards the closet. The first part ends with Sylvester reaching for his Beretta and the husband opening the closet.

Ending "cliffhanger" line: "Now he's at the closet, now he's opening the closet....."

== Charts ==
Chart performance for "Trapped in the Closet (Chapter 1)"
| Chart (2005) | Peak position |
|---|---|
| Belgium (Ultratip Bubbling Under Flanders) | 2 |
| Belgium (Ultratip Bubbling Under Wallonia) | 2 |
| France (SNEP) | 51 |
| Germany (GfK) | 35 |
| Ireland (IRMA) | 31 |
| Netherlands (Single Top 100) | 48 |
| New Zealand (Recorded Music NZ) | 22 |
| Switzerland (Schweizer Hitparade) | 28 |
| UK Singles (OCC) | 33 |
| US Billboard Hot 100 | 22 |
| US Hot R&B/Hip-Hop Songs (Billboard) | 5 |
| US Hot R&B Streaming Songs | 14 |
| US Billboard Pop 100 | 38 |
