= Burn It Up (R. Kelly song) =

Single by R. Kelly featuring Wisin & Yandel

from the album TP.3 Reloaded and Pa'l Mundo: Deluxe Edition
- Released: October 2005
- Recorded: 2005
- Genre: Reggaeton; R&B
- Length: 3:52
- Label: Jive
- Songwriter(s): Robert Kelly; Francisco Saldaña; Víctor Cabrera; Juan Luis Morera Luna; Llandel Veguilla Malavé
- Producer(s): Luny Tunes

R. Kelly singles chronology
"Playa's Only" (2005)	"Burn It Up" (2005)	"That's That" (2006)

"Burn It Up" is fourth official single by American R&B singer R. Kelly from the album TP.3 Reloaded, released in 2005, by Jive Records. It features Puerto Rican reggaeton duo Wisin & Yandel, and was produced by Luny Tunes with co-production by Kelly himself.

== Song information ==
The official remix features a verse by rapper Fat Joe in the beginning and it is featured in R. Kelly's album Remix City Vol. 1. The beat was reused from a track titled "Mírame" by Daddy Yankee & Deevani in the compilation album Mas Flow 2, which was also produced by Luny Tunes and Nely. The official video for the song was released on October 15, 2005.

== Chart positions ==
=== Weekly charts ===
Chart (2005–2006)	Peak position
Austria (Ö3 Austria Top 40)	59
Belgium (Ultratip Bubbling Under Flanders)	8
Belgium (Ultratip Bubbling Under Wallonia)	13
Finland (Suomen virallinen lista)	17
Germany (GfK)	30
Netherlands (Single Top 100)	25
Romania (Romanian Top 100)	47
Switzerland (Schweizer Hitparade)	25
US Hot Latin Songs (Billboard)	30
