= The Blueprint =

Studio album by Jay-Z
- Released: September 11, 2001
- Recorded: April–July 2001
- Studio: Baseline Studios (New York City)
- Genres: East Coast hip-hop; chipmunk soul
- Length: 63:25
- Labels: Roc-A-Fella; Island Def Jam
- Producers: Kanye West; Just Blaze; Bink; Timbaland; The Trackmasters; Eminem; Luis Resto

Jay-Z chronology
The Dynasty: Roc La Familia (2000)	The Blueprint (2001)	Jay-Z Unplugged (2001)

Singles from The Blueprint
- 1. "Izzo (H.O.V.A.)" Released: July 28, 2001; 2. "Girls, Girls, Girls" Released: October 2, 2001; 3. "Jigga That Nigga" Released: January 29, 2002; 4. "Song Cry" Released: April 16, 2002

The Blueprint is the sixth studio album by American rapper Jay-Z, released on September 11, 2001, through Roc-A-Fella Records and The Island Def Jam Music Group. Its release was set a week earlier than initially planned in order to combat bootlegging. Recording sessions for the album took place during 2001 at Manhattan Center Studios and Baseline Studios in New York City. Contrasting the sound of Jay-Z's previous work, The Blueprint features soul-based sampling and production handled primarily by Kanye West, Just Blaze, and Bink, as well as Timbaland, Trackmasters, and Eminem, who also contributes the album's sole guest feature.

At the time of the album's recording, Jay-Z was awaiting two criminal trials, one for gun possession and another for assault, and had become one of hip-hop's most dissed artists, receiving insults from rappers such as Nas, Prodigy, and Jadakiss. The album is also notable for both its producers Kanye West and Just Blaze's breakouts as major producers. West produced four of the thirteen tracks on the album, including the songs "Izzo (H.O.V.A.)" and the controversial "Takeover", which included diss lyrics aimed at rappers Nas and Prodigy, while Just Blaze produced three tracks, "Girls, Girls, Girls", "Song Cry", "U Don't Know", and hidden bonus track "Breathe Easy (Lyrical Exercise)".

The Blueprint was universally acclaimed by music critics, particularly for Jay-Z's performance and the album's soul-based soundscape. It is widely regarded as one of the greatest albums of all time, especially in the hip-hop genre. Its impact is evident in the way it influenced a generation of artists, such as Kendrick Lamar and J. Cole, shaping the sound and direction of hip-hop in the years that followed.

Despite its release coinciding with the September 11 attacks, it sold more than 420,000 copies in its opening week and debuted at number one in the US, holding the spot for three weeks. It was later certified 3× Multi-Platinum by the RIAA. In 2018, the album was selected by the Library of Congress for preservation in the United States National Recording Registry for being "culturally, historically, or aesthetically significant," becoming the first entry created in the 21st century.

== Background ==
The Blueprint was reportedly cut in two weeks, with Jay-Z recording nine songs in two days. At the time, he was awaiting two criminal trials for gun possession and assault. He was also engaged in feuds with various rappers such as Jadakiss, Fat Joe and in particular Nas and Mobb Deep member Prodigy. In the song "Takeover", Jay-Z attacks the two Queensbridge rappers, using a sample of the song "Five to One" by The Doors and an interpolation of David Bowie's "Fame". On The Blueprint, Jay-Z and his producers used vintage soul as inspiration, including a vocal sample on almost every track from such artists as Al Green, Bobby "Blue" Bland, David Ruffin and The Jackson 5. Exceptions include "Jigga That Nigga", "Hola Hovito", and "Renegade", a track produced by and featuring the rapper Eminem, and the only track on the album featuring another rapper on verses.

== Blueprint Lounge Tour ==
In late August, Jay-Z announced a September–October tour in small venues. Because of the September 11 attacks occurring on the same day the album was released, the first two performances were rescheduled. Chicago, San Francisco, and Los Angeles were subsequently added, and Jay-Z donated to relief organizations one dollar of the cost of each ticket sold for the tour.

== Cover ==
The photograph on the album's cover, taken by Jonathan Mannion, was inspired by one from The Firm, a series by Jocelyn Bain Hogg depicting organized crime in Britain. Instead of the telephone and brass knuckles seen next to the ashtray in the original picture, a cigar, a pack of cigars and a microphone were placed.

== Reception and impact ==
Professional ratings
Aggregate scores
Source	Rating
Metacritic	88/100
Review scores
Source	Rating
AllMusic	5/5 stars
Blender	4/5 stars
Entertainment Weekly	B−
Los Angeles Times	3/4 stars
NME	4/5 stars
Pitchfork	8.7/10
Rolling Stone	3.5/5 stars
Uncut	5/5 stars
USA Today	4/4 stars
The Village Voice	A−

According to the review aggregator Metacritic, The Blueprint received "universal acclaim" based on a weighted average score of 88 out of 100 from 12 critic scores. Upon its release, The Blueprint was hailed by Vibe's dream hampton as Jay-Z's best album, as well as the best album of the year, while The Source awarded The Blueprint a perfect "five-mic" rating, a distinction reserved for hip-hop classics. In his review for The Source, Carlito Rodriguez described The Blueprint as "the defining moment of Jay-Z's career", commending his ability to convey emotions through his lyrics. Nathan Rabin called it Jay-Z's "strongest, tightest, most consistent album since his legendary debut, 1996's Reasonable Doubt."

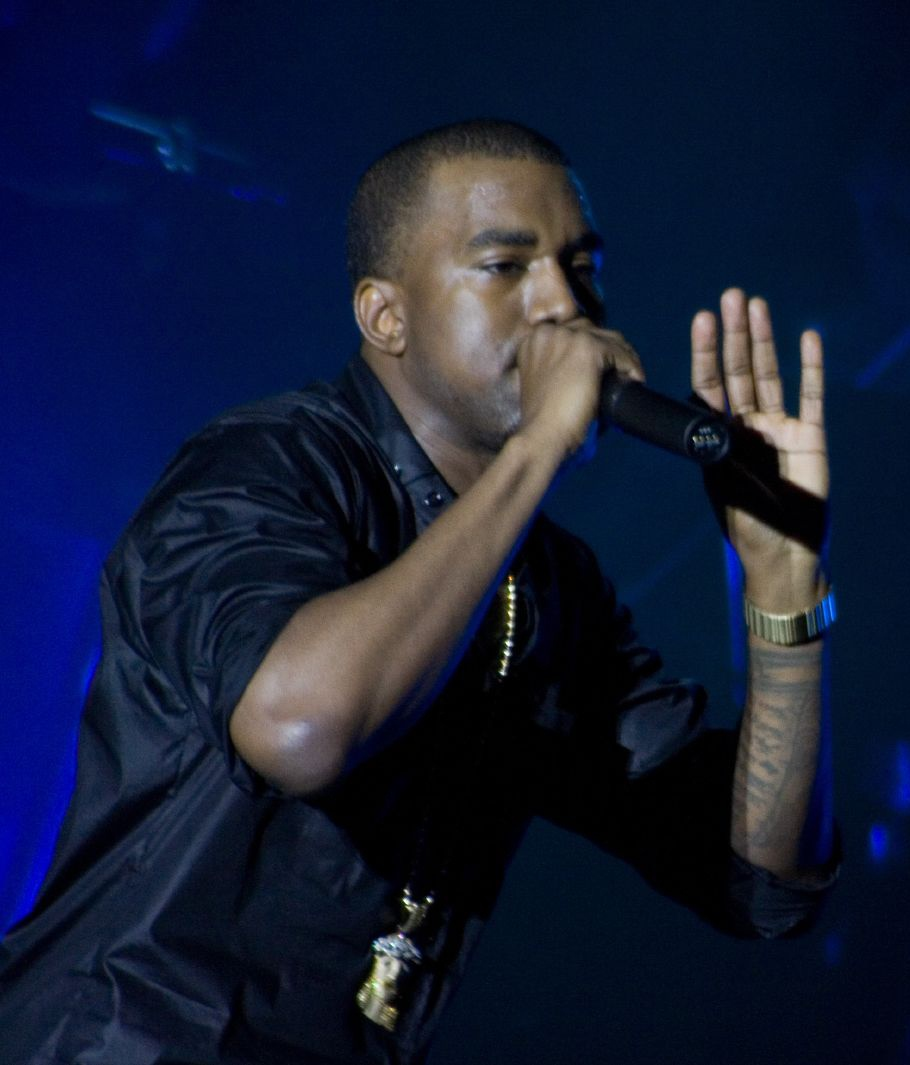
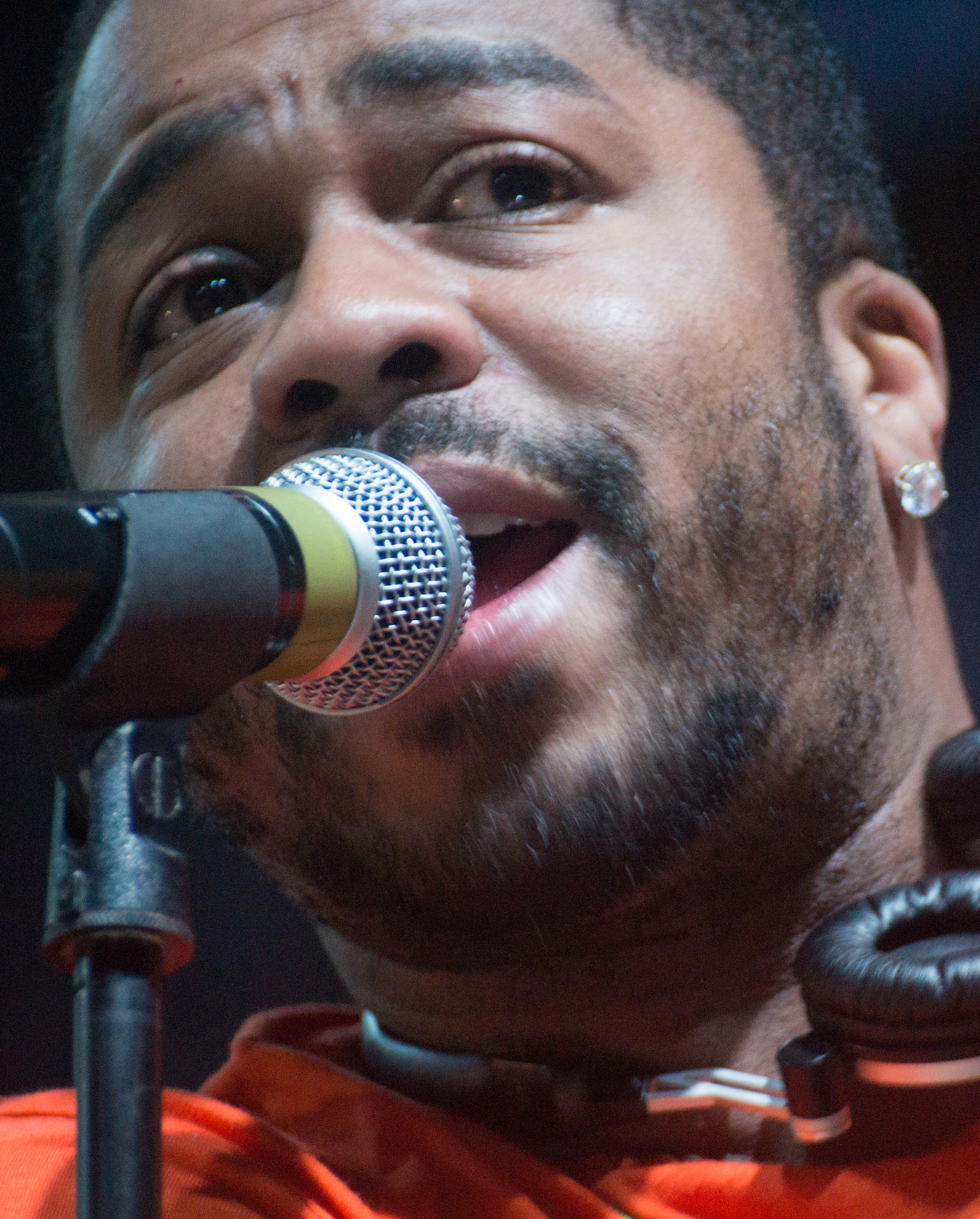
The Blueprint established Kanye West and Just Blaze as major hip-hop producers.

The popularity and commercial success of The Blueprint established Kanye West and Just Blaze as two of hip-hop's most celebrated producers. West in particular would later be signed by Roc-A-Fella Records in 2002. Both West and Just Blaze would go on to have successful music careers. Furthermore, The Blueprint signaled a major stylistic shift in hip-hop production towards a more Soulcentric and sample-reliant sound, creating a number of imitators who attempted to emulate the album's atmospheric style. Prior to The Blueprint, mainstream hip-hop producers had largely eschewed music sampling in favor of the keyboard-driven Timbaland sound (characterized by a shifting, syncopated rhythm, similar to samba or jungle music), due to the financial and legal issues associated with copyright laws.

The Blueprint, however, revived musical sampling as a common practice in hip-hop and dislodged the digital keyboard-driven production style as the dominant sound in hip-hop music. West would later incorporate some of the production and sampling techniques he used on this album into his own solo albums. Entertainment Weekly put it on its end-of-the-decade, "best-of" list, saying, "One of the greatest poets ever to pick up a mic released his magnum opus in 2001. One retirement and one un-retirement later, it's still his finest hour."

In 2003, The Blueprint was ranked number 464 on Rolling Stone magazine's list of the 500 greatest albums of all time; in a revised list in 2012, it was ranked number 252; in the 2020 revised list, the album was ranked number 50. After the Rolling Stone list was revised again at the end of 2023 to include newer releases from artists such as Taylor Swift, Bad Bunny, and Beyoncé, The Blueprint remained at number 50. Pitchfork named The Blueprint the second best album of 2000–2004, and in 2010, it ranked fifth on their Top 200 Albums of the 2000s list. It is ranked at number 4 on Rolling Stone magazine's list of the "100 Best Albums of the 2000s". The album received a perfect "XXL" rating from XXL magazine in a 2007 retrospective article. The Blueprint was also included in the book 1001 Albums You Must Hear Before You Die.

In April 2026, Complex rated The Blueprint as Jay-Z's best album.

=== Accolades ===
Album of the Year

- Ranked No. 4 in NME's 50 "Albums of the Year 2001".
- Ranked No. 5 in Rolling Stone's "Top 10 of 2001".
- Ranked No. 7 in Spin magazine's "Albums of the Year 2001".
- Ranked No. 12 in Wire magazine's "50 Records of the Year 2001".

Best Album of the 2000s

- Ranked No. 1 in Complex Magazine's "The 100 Best Albums of the 2000s".
- Ranked No. 7 in The Stylus Decade's "Top 100 Albums of the 2000s".
- Ranked No. 4 in Rolling Stone magazine's list of "100 Best Albums of the 2000s"
- Ranked No. 5 in Pitchfork's "The Top 200 Albums of the 2000s".

Top Album

- Ranked No. 6 in Billboard's Critics Pick of the decade 1999-2009
- Ranked No. 2 in Pitchfork's "The Top 100 Albums of 2000-04".
- Ranked No. 5 in Stylus Magazine's "Top 50 Albums of 2000-2005".

Best Album of the Decade

- Ranked No. 2 in Entertainment Weekly's Best Albums of the Decade.
- Ranked No. 42 in Paste's 50 Best Albums of the Decade.
- Ranked No. 4 in Rolling Stone magazine's list of the 100 Best Albums of the Decade in 2009.
- Ranked No. 20 in Rhapsody's "100 Best Albums of the Decade" in 2009.
- Ranked No. 8 in Vibe's "The Greatest 50 Albums Since '93" in 2013.

Greatest Album of All Time

- Ranked No. 456 in Rolling Stone magazine's list of the 500 greatest albums of all time in 2003.
- Ranked No. 252 in Rolling Stone magazine's revised list of the 500 greatest albums of all time in 2012.
- Ranked No. 50 in Rolling Stone magazine's revised list of the 500 greatest albums of all time in 2020.
- Ranked No. 13 in Apple Music's 100 Best Albums in 2024.
- Unranked in 1001 Albums You Must Hear Before You Die.

== Commercial performance ==
In spite of its release coinciding with the 9/11 attacks, The Blueprint sold over 427,000 copies in its opening week, becoming Jay-Z's fourth consecutive album to reach number one on the Billboard 200 chart. It was certified double platinum as sales stand at over two million units in the U.S. Sales stand at 2.7 million as of February 2012.

== Legacy ==
In support of the album's twenty-fifth anniversary, Jay-Z performed a concert at Yankee Stadium in New York City on July 11, 2026. Slick Rick, Eminem, and Pharrell Williams made guest appearances at the concert.

== Track listing ==
The Blueprint track listing
No.	Title	Writer(s)	Producer(s)	Length
1.	"The Ruler's Back"	Shawn Carter; Roosevelt Harrell III; Phil Hurtt; Walter Sigler	Bink	3:50
2.	"Takeover"	Carter; Kanye West; Eric Burdon; Lawrence Parker; Alan Lomax; Bryan Chandler; Rodney Lemay; Jim Morrison; John Densmore; Robby Krieger; Ray Manzarek	West	5:13
3.	"Izzo (H.O.V.A.)"	Carter; West; Berry Gordy; Alphonso Mizell; Freddie Perren; Deke Richards	West	4:00
4.	"Girls, Girls, Girls"	Carter; Justin Smith; Tom Brock; Robert Relf	Just Blaze	4:35
5.	"Jigga That Nigga"	Carter; Jean-Claude Olivier; Samuel Barnes	Trackmasters	3:24
6.	"U Don't Know"	Carter; Smith; Bobby Byrd	Just Blaze	3:19
7.	"Hola' Hovito"	Carter; Timothy Mosley	Timbaland	4:33
8.	"Heart of the City (Ain't No Love)"	Carter; West; Michael Price; Dan Walsh	West	3:43
9.	"Never Change"	Carter; West; Robert Eugene Miller	West	3:59
10.	"Song Cry"	Carter; Smith; Douglas Gibbs; Ralph Johnson	Just Blaze	5:04
11.	"All I Need"	Carter; Harrell; Michael D. Monroe	Bink	4:27
12.	"Renegade" (featuring Eminem)	Carter; Marshall Mathers; Luis Resto	Eminem; Luis Resto^{[a]}	5:38
13.	"Blueprint (Momma Loves Me)"	Carter; Harrell; Al Green	Bink	3:41
14.	"Breathe Easy (Lyrical Exercise)" (hidden track)	Carter; Smith; Tyrone Thomas; August Moon; Gerald Brown; Stanley Clarke; Michael Garson; Raymond Gomez	Just Blaze	3:45
15.	"Girls, Girls, Girls (Part 2)" (hidden track)	Carter; Smith; Robert Poindexter; Jackie Members	West	4:14
Total length:				63:25

=== Notes ===
- ^{^[a]} signifies an additional producer
- "Takeover" features additional vocals by Josey Scott.
- "Izzo (H.O.V.A.)" features uncredited vocals by Demme Uloa.
- "Girls, Girls, Girls" features additional vocals by Q-Tip, Slick Rick and Biz Markie.
- "Jigga That Nigga" features additional vocals by Stephanie Miller and Michelle Mills.
- "Heart Of The City (Ain't No Love)" features uncredited vocals by Keon Bryce.
- "Never Change" features uncredited vocals by Kanye West.
- "Blueprint (Momma Loves Me)" features background vocals by Schevise Harrell and Luren Leek.
- "Girls, Girls, Girls (Part 2)" features uncredited vocals by Michael Jackson and Chanté Moore.

=== Sample credits ===
- "The Ruler's Back" contains a sample of "If" performed by Jackie Moore, and an interpolation of "The Ruler's Back" performed by Slick Rick.
- "Takeover" contains samples of "Five to One" performed by The Doors, "Sound of da Police" performed by KRS-One, and an interpolation of "Fame" performed by David Bowie.
- "Izzo (H.O.V.A.)" contains a sample of "I Want You Back" performed by Jackson 5.
- "Girls, Girls, Girls" contains a sample of "There's Nothing in This World That Can Stop Me from Loving You" performed by Tom Brock, and "High Power Rap" performed by Crash Crew.
- "U Don't Know" contains a sample of "I'm Not to Blame" performed by Bobby Byrd.
- "Heart of the City (Ain't No Love)" contains a sample of "Ain't No Love in the Heart of the City" performed by Bobby Blue Bland.
- "Never Change" contains a sample of "Common Man" performed by David Ruffin.
- "Song Cry" contains a sample of "Sounds Like a Love Song" performed by Bobby Glenn.
- "All I Need" contains a sample of "I Can't Break Away" performed by Natalie Cole.
- "Blueprint (Momma Loves Me)" contains a sample of "Free at Last" performed by Al Green.
- "Breathe Easy (Lyrical Exercise)" contains a sample of "Got to Find My Own Place" performed by Stanley Clarke.
- "Girls, Girls, Girls (Part 2)" contains a sample of "Trying Girls Out" performed by The Persuaders.

== Personnel ==
- Shawn "Jay-Z" Carter – performer, executive producer
- Eminem – performer, producer, mixing
- Slick Rick – vocals
- Q-Tip – vocals
- Biz Markie – vocals
- Demme Ulloa – vocals
- Schevise Harrell – vocals
- Lauren Leek – vocals
- Keon Bryce – vocals
- Stephanie Miller – vocals
- Michele Mills – vocals
- Josey Scott – vocals
- Victor Flowers – organ
- Kanye West – producer, vocals
- Just Blaze – producer
- Bink – producer
- Timbaland – producer
- Poke & Tone – producer
- DJ Head – drum programming
- Damon Dash – executive producer
- Kareem "Biggs" Burke – executive producer
- Gimel "Young Guru" Keaton – engineer, mixing
- Jimmy Douglas – engineer, mixing
- Rajon Wright – assistant engineer
- Shane Woodley – assistant engineer
- Jason Goldstein – mixing
- Richard Huredia – mixing
- Supa Engineer "Duro" – mixing
- Doug Wilson – mixing
- Tony Vanias – recording director
- Tony Dawsey – mastering
- Jason Noto – art direction
- Jonathan Mannion – photography
- Della Valle – images
- Dana "Sonni Black" Anderson – composer
- Sonet Lumiere Philadelphia – music publisher

== Charts ==
=== Weekly charts ===
Chart (2001)	Peak position
Canadian Albums (Billboard)	3
Canadian R&B Albums (Nielsen SoundScan)	7
Dutch Albums (Album Top 100)	51
French Albums (SNEP)	73
German Albums (Offizielle Top 100)	55
Norwegian Albums (VG-lista)	36
Scottish Albums (Official Charts)	56
Swedish Albums (Sverigetopplistan)	30
Swiss Albums (Schweizer Hitparade)	59
UK Albums (Official Charts)	30
UK R&B Albums (Official Charts)	2
US Billboard 200	1
US Top R&B/Hip-Hop Albums (Billboard)	1

=== Year-end charts ===
Chart (2001)	Position
Canadian Albums (Nielsen SoundScan)	92
Canadian R&B Albums (Nielsen SoundScan)	21
Canadian Rap Albums (Nielsen SoundScan)	10
US Billboard 200	52
US Top R&B/Hip-Hop Albums (Billboard)	12

Chart (2002)	Position
Canadian R&B Albums (Nielsen SoundScan)	100
Canadian Rap Albums (Nielsen SoundScan)	55
US Billboard 200	123
US Top R&B/Hip-Hop Albums (Billboard)	44

== Certifications ==
Region	Certification	Certified units/sales
Canada (Music Canada)	Platinum	100,000^{^}
United Kingdom (BPI)	Gold	212,000
United States (RIAA)	3× Platinum	3,000,000^{‡}
^{^} Shipments figures based on certification alone.^{‡} Sales+streaming figures based on certification alone.

== See also ==
- List of number-one albums of 2001 (U.S.)
- List of number-one R&B albums of 2001 (U.S.)
