= Trapped in the Closet =

Musical soap opera by R. Kelly

- The BIG Package DVD cover
- Directed by: R. Kelly; Jim Swaffield
- Written by: R. Kelly
- Based on: Trapped in the Closet by R. Kelly
- Produced by: R. Kelly; Ann Carli; Barry Weiss; Elliot Lewis Rosenblatt; Rick Johnson; Scott Eicher
- Starring: R. Kelly; Cat Wilson; Rolando A. Boyce; LeShay Tomlinson; Malik S. Middleton; Eric Lane; Rebecca Field; Michael K. Williams
- Cinematography: David Hennings
- Edited by: Victor Mignatti; Jim Swaffield
- Music by: R. Kelly
- Production companies: Fuzzy Bunny Productions; Relevant
- Distributed by: Jive/SBMG (2005–2008); RCA/SME (2009–2012)
- Release dates: October 1, 2005 (Chapter 1–12); August 21, 2007 (Chapters 13–22); December 2007 (The BIG Package); November 23, 2012 (The Next Installment)
- Running time: 133 minutes (Total runtime): 91 minutes (The BIG Package); Chapters 1–12: 43 minutes; Chapters 13–22: 48 minutes; 42 minutes (The Next Installment); Chapters 23–33: 42 minutes
- Country: United States
- Language: English
- Budget: $3 million (22 chapters); $750,000 (The Next Installment)

Trapped in the Closet is a musical soap opera series by American R&B singer, songwriter and producer R. Kelly, with 33 "chapters" released sporadically from 2005 to 2012. Written, produced, and directed by Kelly, the series, described as a "hip-hopera" (hip-hop opera), tells a story of a one-night stand which sets off a chain of events, gradually revealing a greater web of lies, affairs and deceit—a multitude of intertwined love triangles, extramarital affairs, and infidelities begin to unfold.

== Background ==
The first five chapters of Trapped in the Closet originally appeared as the final tracks on Kelly's album TP.3 Reloaded. R. Kelly wrote and produced all five chapters, and they were recorded by Andy Gallas. The first chapter was released as the lead single from the album in 2005 by Jive Records. Kelly and Jive Records promoted the songs by releasing each of the first five chapters to radio stations one at a time.

Following the success and popularity of the Trapped in the Closet song series, R. Kelly lip synched a "new chapter" at an appearance at the 2005 MTV Video Music Awards. In November 2005, Jive Records released a DVD titled Trapped in the Closet, which included seven new chapters in addition to the first five from TP.3 Reloaded, bringing the total number of chapters to twelve. The material previewed by Kelly at the MTV Video Music Awards revealed an early version of some parts of the twelfth chapter in the series.

Nearly two years later, in August 2007, Kelly and Jive released ten more chapters on another Trapped in the Closet DVD.

In December 2007, the first 22 chapters were released in a DVD entitled The Big Package, which included a "commentary remix" with a preview of chapter 23. On December 21, 2011, Kelly told TMZ that he had written thirty-two more chapters, and was seeking investors in order to continue the saga. IFC announced in October 2012 that it would show new chapters of Trapped in the Closet on November 23, 2012.

When asked about the writing of the song, Kelly said: "I don't know how to explain how I wrote it. It just keeps rhyming and rhyming." He stated that Trapped in the Closet had taken on "a life, mind and body of its own", and called the series an "alien", crediting “the aliens” with its creation. Kelly claimed that the song's dark and moody instrumental was influenced by his frustrations and depression following his removal from the ill-fated Best of Both Worlds tour with Jay-Z in October 2004.

== Plot ==
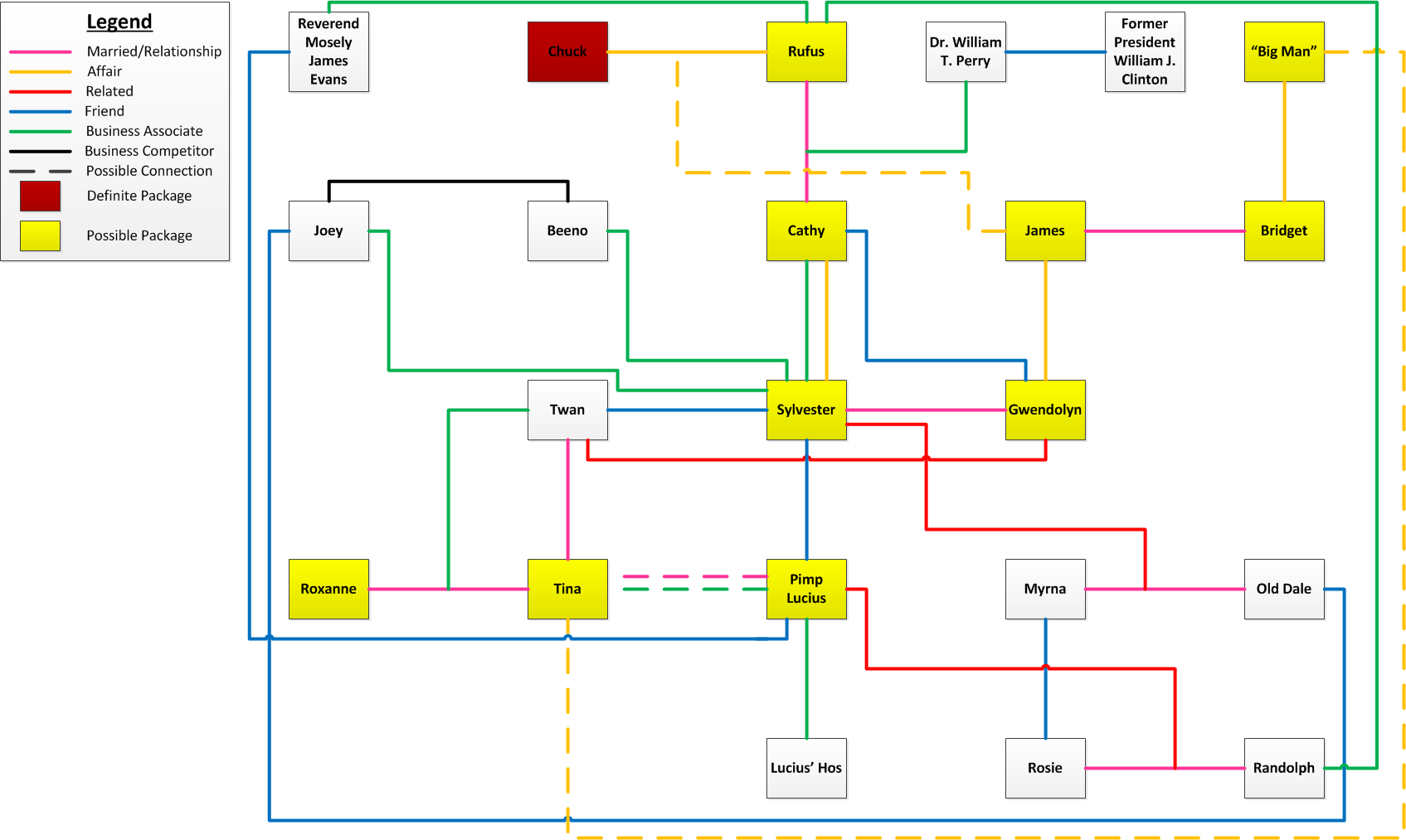
Diagram of all relationships up to Chapter 33 of Trapped in the Closet

Each chapter follows a storyline that continues throughout the series. Kelly voices the role of the song's protagonist, Sylvester (Kelly's middle name), who wakes up after a one-night stand with a woman. As he prepares to leave, however, the woman's husband returns and Sylvester is forced to hide in a closet. This sets off an escalating series of events.

== Cast ==
=== Introduced in Part 1 ===
- R. Kelly as Sylvester and the narrator
- LeShay Tomlinson as Cathy Longs
- Rolando A. Boyce as Rufus Longs
- Malik S. Middleton as Chuck
- Michael Kenneth Williams as Sgt. James
- Cat Wilson as Gwendolyn
- Eric Lane as Twan
- LaDonna Tittle as Rosie, The Nosy Neighbor
- Rebecca Field as Bridget
- Drevon Cooks as "Big Man"

=== Introduced in Part 2 ===
- R. Kelly as Randolph, Rev. Mos and Pimp Lucius
- Tracey Bonner as Tina
- Erika Ringor as Roxanne
- Will Oldham as Sgt. Platoon
- Greg Hollimon as Det. Tom
- Brian "Wildcat" Smith as Bishop Craig
- Pierre Maurey as Church Man
- Brendan Averett as Henchman #1
- Gino Crededio as Henchman #2
- Dominic Capone III as Joey
- Katherine Mitchell as Myrna
- Alan Donovan as Desk Sergeant
- Heather Zagone as Dixie attendant

=== Introduced in Part 3 ===
- R. Kelly as Dr. William T. Perry, Beeno
- Javon "Faz" Johnson as Bankhead
- Larry

== Legacy ==
The first chapter of Trapped in the Closet was ranked by VH1 as the #41 best song of the 2000s.

=== Parodies and derivatives ===
Trapped in the Closet has inspired numerous parodies and derivatives.

- In July 2005, a parody titled Harry Potter: Trapped in the Closet Under the Stairs was aired in five parts (each part for the first 5 Harry Potter books) on Q100 radio based in Atlanta, Georgia.
- On July 15, 2005, Jimmy Kimmel made a parody of the song cycle, called "The Pizza", on his show Jimmy Kimmel Live! on ABC. This parody was aired in six installments, in July, November and December 2005. The series documents Jimmy Kimmel and his quest to have a slice of pizza. A seventh episode was broadcast in October 2007, following the release of chapters 13 through 22 of Trapped in the Closet.
- In August 2005, website Something Awful released a CliffsNotes style analysis of the first five chapters.
- In August 2005, website No Film School released Out of the Closet, a guerrilla remix of the first five chapters. "Out of the Closet" tells a completely different story than Trapped in the Closet — all using R. Kelly's own words and original vocals, as well as parts of a Dave Chappelle parody.
- In September 2005, Tichina Arnold, Tisha Campbell and Duane Martin performed a live parody at the BET Comedy Awards.
- On October 2, 2005, MADtv aired a parody called "Trapped in the Cupboard", featuring R. Kelly (spoofed by Jordan Peele) and his wife battling over breakfast cereal.
- Computer Games Magazine reports of a group who has recreated the first five chapters using The Sims 2 animation engine.
- On November 9, 2005, website Something Awful released a CliffsNotes-style analysis of the next seven chapters.
- On November 11, 2005, Eric Appel hosted a panel discussion about the song and video at the New York City chapter of the Upright Citizens Brigade Theatre. The panel featured Aziz Ansari, Anthony King, Brian Berrebbi, Eugene Mirman, Rob Huebel, and Brett Gelman.
- On November 16, 2005, a South Park episode named "Trapped in the Closet" aired. The plot proceeds around Stan being thought of as the second coming of L. Ron Hubbard by Scientologists and Tom Cruise locking himself in Stan's closet. As the incident receives news coverage, Kelly appears and sings about the situation, and is eventually used to coax Cruise out of the closet before going inside it himself.
- On November 19, 2005, a Saturday Night Live episode parodied the song, featuring Kelly fighting with his wife who turns out to be seeing an alien who also turns out to be Kelly's father.
- In January 2006, Aziz Ansari and Paul Scheer took Eric Appel's panel show to the Upright Citizens Brigade Theatre in Los Angeles. Special guest panelists have included Patton Oswalt, David Cross, Paul F. Tompkins, Drevon Cooks ("Big Man") and others. Since then, it has been performed regularly at the UCB Theatre on both coasts.
- On the May 11, 2006, episode of Eve, which was the episode's last before UPN ceased operations in the cliffhanger episode, Nick (Brian Hooks) and J.T. (Jason George) hide in a closet, which Jamal (Darius McCrary) opens. Eve was also cancelled due to merger of UPN and The WB.
- In September 2006, "Weird Al" Yankovic released "Trapped in the Drive-Thru" for his album Straight Outta Lynwood.
- In a 2013 episode of the sketch comedy Loiter Squad, a sketch featured a parody of Trapped in the Closet titled "Trapped with Tyler", in which cast members Tyler the Creator and Jasper Dolphin, dressed as Sylvester and Bishop Craig, respectively, walk through a busy street and sing an auto-tuned parody of the song. Its lyrical content consists of mockery of other peoples' fashion sense, as well as rude insinuations about other peoples' personal lives.
- A 2016 episode of Crazy Ex Girlfriend features a parody titled "Stuck in the Bathroom".
- In a sixth-season episode of the animated series Celebrity Deathmatch, R. Kelly teams up with Kelly Clarkson to defeat Ludacris and Criss Angel in a fight. At random intervals, Kelly pauses to narrate his actions during the fight in a similar manner to Trapped in the Closet, including mention of Bridget's affair with Big Man. Clarkson eventually does similar, causing Kelly to express annoyance.
- On May 23, 2016, American Dad! aired an episode titled "Criss-Cross Applesauce: The Ballad of Billy Jesusworth" featuring the character Steve Smith doing a parody of Trapped in the Closet called "Trapped in the Locker".
- Caught, the web series released by DeStorm Power beginning in 2017, is a series of musical episodes. Power says that Trapped in the Closet and the way the series held peoples' attention inspired the series.

== Reception ==
Roger Cormier wrote that "when journalists write about...Trapped in the Closet, they tend to throw out a high-brow literary reference", but then described it as "a subtlety-free, it's-so-dumb-it's-brilliant work of art" comparable to "Laurence Sterne's 18th-century novel The Life and Opinions of Tristam Shandy, Gentleman [sic]".

Writing for Flagpole, Hillary Brown linked Trapped in the Closet to the Renaissance concept of sprezzatura and compared it to the work of Stendhal and John Ashbery.

John Lichman warned "once you start watching Trapped in the Closet, whether out of curiosity or because you think it's a joke, you will find yourself sucked down a hole into something more obsession-friendly than Arrested Development when it comes to jokes, plot twists and fan-service."

Chuck Klosterman, writing for The Guardian, called it a cult classic and wrote: "Describing Trapped in the Closet to anyone who hasn't seen it themselves is virtually impossible, simply because there's no other art to compare it with (it falls somewhere between a parody of musical theatre, a soap opera from the late 1970s, and a BET version of the Red Shoe Diaries)."

Writing for Pitchfork, Jen Pelly stated "If you haven't seen Trapped in the Closet before... stop what you're doing and watch all of it right now. It is truly mind-blowing."

== VEVO release ==
Prior to Kelly's conviction of sexual abuse in 2021, the first 22 chapters of the Trapped in the Closet series were released via VEVO, where they appeared for free ad-supported viewing. By May 2012, the series had averaged 7,000,000 views for the first 22 chapters on the website itself, and a further average of 7,000,000 views on Kelly's VEVO YouTube page. However, chapters 3, 5, 6, and 13 were cut short. Eight days after Kelly was found guilty on multiple counts of sex trafficking, racketeering and violating the Mann Act on September 27, 2021, his YouTube channel was terminated; all visuals for this series are no longer available to watch on the platform.

== Charts ==
=== Chapter 1 ===
==== Weekly charts ====
Chart (2005)	Peak position
UK Single (Official Charts Company)	33
Belgium (Ultratop) Single Chart	42
Belgium (Ultratip Flanders) Single Chart	2
Belgium (Ultratip Wallonia) Single Chart	2
France Single Chart	51
Germany Single Chart	35
Ireland Single Chart	31
Dutch Single Chart	48
New Zealand Single Chart	22
Swiss Single Chart	28
US Billboard Hot 100	22
US Billboard Pop Songs	38
US Billboard Hot R&B/Hip-Hop Songs	5
US Hot R&B Streaming Songs	14

=== Release history ===
List of DVDs, with sales and certifications
Title	Album details	Sales	Certifications
Trapped in the Closet: Chapters 1–12	Released: October 1, 2005; Formats: CD (Chapters 1–10 as promotional discs), DVD, digital streaming; Label: Jive, Zomba	US: 200,000	RIAA: 2× Platinum
Trapped in the Closet: Chapters 13–22	Released: August 21, 2007; Formats: DVD, digital streaming; Label: Jive/Zomba/SBMG	US: 100,000	RIAA: Platinum
Trapped in the Closet: The BIG Package	Released: December, 2007; Formats: DVD, digital streaming; Label: Jive/SME		
Trapped in the Closet: Chapters 23–33	Released: February 13, 2013; Formats: digital download; Label: RCA/SME		

== Other planned projects ==
R. Kelly stated in an interview with Rap-Up TV that he was, at the time, working on a movie version of Trapped in the Closet that would have been released to theaters. The movie was rumored to be called Trapped in the Closet: The Movie. The movie has most likely been cancelled, due to the allegations against Kelly.

Trapped in the Closet: The Book was a planned book by Kelly. The book was set to be released sometime in 2018 alongside the Broadway debut of Trapped in the Closet, however neither of these projects were released to the public once the singer's allegations of child sexual abuse came to the public. The book was to be about what happened before the characters actually would have met in the musical. The book has been shown in the latest chapters of the show in 2012, Chapters 23–33. R. Kelly dubbed it "the prequel meeting the sequel".

== See also ==
- "I Admit", a 2018 song by R. Kelly, which he attempts to debunk his sexual abuse allegations
