= Jigga That Nigga =

2002 single by Jay-Z

Single by Jay-Z

from the album The Blueprint
- Released: January 29, 2002
- Recorded: July 2001
- Genre: Hip hop; R&B
- Length: 3:25
- Label: Roc-A-Fella; Def Jam
- Songwriters: Shawn Carter; Samuel Barnes Jr.; Jean-Claude Oliver; Larry Gates
- Producer: Poke and Tone

Jay-Z singles chronology
"Honey" (2002)	"Jigga That Nigga" (2002)	"Song Cry" (2002)

"Jigga That Nigga" is a song by the American rapper Jay-Z. It was the third single from his sixth studio album, The Blueprint. It has additional vocals from Stephanie Miller and Michelle Mills but they are not credited as featuring. In the US, the song peaked at #66 on the Hot 100. In recent years, his nickname "jigga" has become synonymous with being "fresh, fly" and "stylish."

== Background ==
"Jigga That Nigga" was produced by production duo Poke and Tone, consisting of Samuel Barnes and Jean-Claude Olivier, for Jay-Z's sixth studio album, The Blueprint. The song was among the first tracks recorded for the album and emerged from Jay-Z's early studio sessions known as "I Survived Beat Wednesday," during which producers presented beats at Baseline Studios for artist feedback. Originally, the track was intended for MC Lyte, but Barnes and Olivier recognized that it better suited Jay-Z's style during recording. Jay-Z recorded the track twice; the first session convinced the producers of its potential, but he later revisited the vocals three days later, delivering revised rhymes that the team considered superior. A distinctive element of the introduction features a spoken phrase in French, contributed by Shaka Zulu's wife, who was present in the studio.

== Credits and personnel ==
The credits for "Jigga That Nigga" are adapted from the liner notes of The Blueprint.

Studio locations

- Mastered at Masterdisk, New York City, New York.
- Mixed and recorded at Baseline Studios, New York City, New York.

Personnel

- Jay-Z – songwriting, vocals
- Trackmasters – production, songwriting
- Young Guru – recording
- Shane Woodley – recording assistant
- Jason Goldstein – mixing
- Stephanie Miller – additional vocals
- Michelle Mills – additional vocals
- Tony Dawsey – mastering

== Charts ==
Chart (2002)	Peak position
US Billboard Hot 100	66
US Hot R&B/Hip-Hop Songs (Billboard)	27
US Hot Rap Songs (Billboard)	7

== Release history ==
Country	Date	Format	Label
United States	January 29, 2002	12-inch single	Roc-A-Fella, Def Jam
