= Tom Brock (singer) =

American singer-songwriter

- Born: Tom James Brocker; August 25, 1942; Austin, Texas, United States
- Origin: Los Angeles, California, United States
- Died: May 25, 2002 (aged 59) Richmond, California, United States
- Genres: Soul
- Occupations: Singer, songwriter
- Label: 20th Century
- Formerly of: Barry White

Tom James Brocker (August 25, 1942 – May 25, 2002) was an American soul singer from Austin, Texas. Brock worked with Barry White on the 20th Century Records label in the 1970s. He wrote songs for Gloria Scott's 1974 album What Am I Gonna Do?, including "A Case of Too Much Love Makin". That same year he also released his one and only album, I Love You More And More, which included a highly popular title track. The album was produced by White and Gene Page. The song "There's Nothing in This World That Can Stop Me From Loving You" was later sampled by producer Just Blaze for the single "Girls, Girls, Girls" on Jay-Z's album The Blueprint in 2001. This led to renewed interest in Brock, and in 2003 (a year after Brock died), the album was re-released on CD. The song "I Love You More and More" was later sampled by producer Minnesota for the single "The Panties" on Mos Def/Yasiin Bey's album The New Danger in 2004.

He died of natural causes on May 25, 2002, in his home in Richmond, California.
