= Playa's Only =

Single by R. Kelly featuring The Game

from the album TP.3 Reloaded
- Released: June 14, 2005
- Recorded: 2005
- Genre: R&B; hip hop
- Length: 3:52
- Label: Jive
- Songwriter(s): Robert Kelly; Jayceon Taylor; Scott Storch
- Producer(s): Scott Storch; R. Kelly

R. Kelly singles chronology
"Trapped in the Closet (Chapter 1)" (2005)	"Playa's Only" (2005)	"Burn It Up" (2005)

The Game singles chronology
"Dreams" (2005)	"Playa's Only" (2005)	"Put You on the Game" (2005)

"Playa's Only" is the second official single by R. Kelly from his album TP.3 Reloaded. It features The Game and samples his song "How We Do". The song was written, produced, and arranged by Kelly and Scott Storch.

== Charts ==
=== Weekly charts ===
Chart (2005)	Peak position
Belgium (Ultratip Bubbling Under Flanders)	2
Belgium (Ultratip Bubbling Under Wallonia)	2
France (SNEP)	51
Germany (GfK)	35
Ireland (IRMA)	31
Netherlands (Dutch Top 40 Tipparade)	4
Netherlands (Single Top 100)	48
New Zealand (Recorded Music NZ)	22
Scotland (OCC)	46
Switzerland (Schweizer Hitparade)	28
UK Singles (OCC)	33
UK Hip Hop/R&B (OCC)	2
US Billboard Hot 100	65
US Hot R&B/Hip-Hop Songs (Billboard)	36
US Pop 100 (Billboard)	91
US Rhythmic (Billboard)	20

=== Year-end charts ===
Chart (2005)	Position
UK Urban (Music Week)	22
