= Girls, Girls, Girls (Jay-Z song) =

2001 single by Jay-Z

Single by Jay-Z

from the album The Blueprint
- Released: October 2, 2001
- Recorded: April 2001
- Genre: Hip-hop; chipmunk soul
- Length: 4:35
- Label: Roc-A-Fella; Def Jam
- Songwriters: Shawn Carter; Tom Brock; Justin Smith
- Producer: Just Blaze

Jay-Z singles chronology
"20 Bag Shorty" (2001)	"Girls, Girls, Girls" (2001)	"Honey" (2002)

Music video
- "Girls, Girls, Girls" on YouTube

"Girls, Girls, Girls" is the second single from rapper Jay-Z's album The Blueprint (2001). The single was released on October 2, 2001. It is a playful description of the artist's promiscuous lifestyle. The song contains a sample of "There's Nothing In This World That Can Stop Me From Loving You" by Tom Brock, who died a year later. The chorus features a lyrical interpolation of "High Power Rap" by Crash Crew. The song has additional vocals sung by Q-Tip, Slick Rick, and Biz Markie, but they are not credited as featured guests on the back artwork; they are, however, credited in the album's liner notes.

A remix of the song produced by Kanye West can be found as a hidden track on The Blueprint after the songs "Blueprint (Momma Loves Me)" and the other hidden song, "Lyrical Exercise". The remix is composed of new verses by Jay-Z, a new instrumental sampling "Trying Girls Out" by the Persuaders, and uncredited vocals from Michael Jackson and Chanté Moore. Just Blaze originally produced the song for Ghostface Killah.

== Music video ==
The video (directed by Marc Klasfeld) was filmed in September 2001 in Los Angeles, California. Jay-Z stated in a 2011 interview that he was in Los Angeles preparing for the shoot when the September 11 terrorist attacks took place:

I flew to L.A. I was shooting a video for a song called 'Girls, Girls, Girls,'" he began. "I'd dropped my album The Blueprint on the same day. And I just remember waking up in LA and thinking everybody was playing, like 'That can't be,' then turning on the TV and it looked like something from one of those apocalyptic movies.

— Jay-Z, in a 2011 interview with HipHopDX

Actresses Carmen Electra, Tamala Jones, and Paula Jai Parker all make cameo appearances in the song's music video. Damon Dash, Biz Markie, and Kanye West also make brief appearances in the video.

Jay-Z wore the Mitchell & Ness 1947 Washington Redskins jersey of Hall of Fame quarterback Sammy Baugh as well as a 1982 San Diego Padres jersey. This increased demand for the throwback jersey and renewed popular awareness of Baugh.

== Credits and personnel ==
The credits for "Girls, Girls, Girls" are adapted from the liner notes of The Blueprint.

Studio locations

- Mastered at Masterdisk, New York City, New York.
- Mixed and recorded at Baseline Studios, New York City, New York.

Personnel

- Jay-Z – songwriting, vocals
- Just Blaze – production, songwriting
- Tom Brock – songwriting
- Robert Relf – songwriting
- Young Guru – recording
- Kamel Adbo – recording
- Jason Goldstein – mixing
- Q-Tip – additional vocals
- Slick Rick – additional vocals
- Biz Markie – additional vocals
- Tony Dawsey – mastering

Samples

- "Girls, Girls, Girls" contains samples of "There's Nothing in This World That Can Stop Me from Loving You", as performed by Tom Brock and written by Brock and Robert Relf.

== Charts ==
=== Weekly charts ===
Chart (2001–2002)	Peak position
Australia (ARIA)	63
Australian Urban (ARIA)	15
US Billboard Hot 100	17
US Hot R&B/Hip-Hop Songs (Billboard)	4
US Hot Rap Songs (Billboard)	9

=== Year-end charts ===
Chart (2001)	Position
US Hot R&B/Hip-Hop Songs (Billboard)	94
Chart (2002)	Position
US Hot R&B/Hip-Hop Songs (Billboard)	93

== Certifications ==
Region	Certification	Certified units/sales
United States (RIAA)	Gold	500,000^{‡}
^{‡} Sales+streaming figures based on certification alone.

== See also ==
- List of songs recorded by Jay-Z
