= List of awards and nominations received by Jay-Z =

Jay-Z awards and nominations
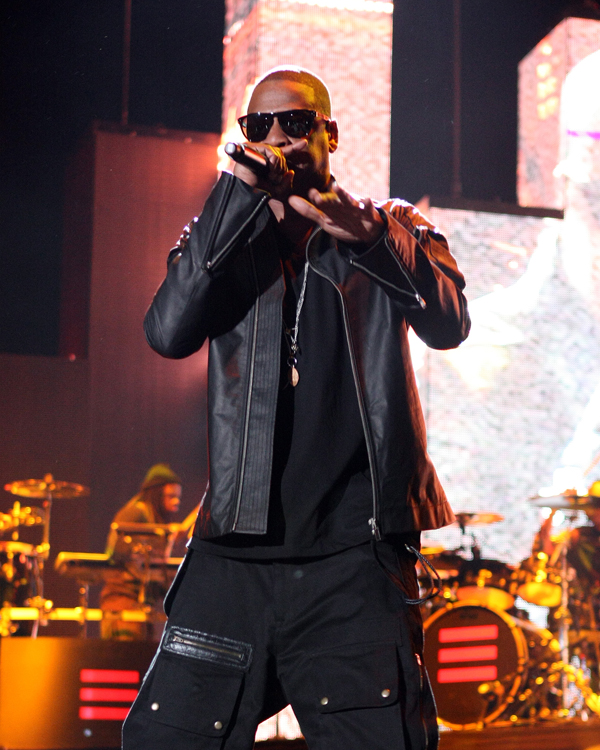
- Jay-Z performing in 2010
Awards and nominations
Award	Wins	Nominations
American Music Awards	3	7
Billboard Music Awards	6	26
BET Hip Hop Awards	25	65
Critics' Choice Awards	0	1
Grammy Awards	25	89
MTV EMAs	2	11
MTV VMAs	14	37
NAACP Image Awards	2	19
Primetime Emmy Awards	3	8
Sports Emmy Awards	1	1
Tony Awards	0	1

Totals (Note: Certain award groups do not simply award one winner. They acknowledge several different recipients, have runners-up, and have third place. Since this is a specific recognition and is different from losing an award, runner-up mentions are considered wins in this award tally. For simplification and to avoid errors, each award in this list has been presumed to have had a prior nomination.)
- Wins: 279
- Nominations: 582

The American rapper, record producer, and entrepreneur Jay-Z has received numerous industry awards, nominations, and honorary accolades. Active in the music industry field since the 1990s, throughout his career, Jay-Z has won 25 Grammy Awards, making him the second rapper with the most Grammy Awards, and with 89 nominations, he has the second most nominations in the ceremony history after his wife Beyoncé, who has 99 Nominations. He was also honored with non-competitive Grammy Salute to Industry Icons Award (2018) and Global Impact Award (2024). He became the first rapper to be included in the Songwriters Hall of Fame (2017) and into the Rock and Roll Hall of Fame (2021).

With his 13 studio albums, singles, and collaborations with Kanye West, Justin Timberlake, Rihanna, Alicia Keys, Linkin Park and Beyoncé, he won 25 BET Hip Hop Awards, 9 BET Awards, 6 Billboard Music Awards and 2 Brit Awards. He received accolades at the Cannes Lions International Festival, Clio Awards, AICE & AICP Awards, D&AD Awards for his music videos; winning 14 times at the MTV Video Music Awards.

With his entertainment company Roc Nation, Jay-Z served as producer for several television programs, films, and stage productions, being honored with a Television Academy Honors and a Peabody Award. He also won two Primetime Emmy Awards, a Sports Emmy Awards, and received a nomination at the Tony Award for Best Musical for Fela!.

For his philanthropism, social justice and activism work he was recognized with the NAACP Image Award President's Award and the GLAAD Vanguard Award.

== Awards and nominations ==
Award	Year	Work	Category	Result	Ref.
ADC Awards	2018	"The Story of O.J."	Craft in Motion: Animation	Bronze	
African-American Film Critics Association Awards	2022	"Guns Go Bang"	Best Music	Won	
African-American Film Critics Association Awards	2022	"The Harder They Fall"	Best Music	Won	
AICE & AICP Awards	2007	"Hewlett Packard HP Hands"	Motion Design and Graphics	Won	
AICE & AICP Awards	2014	"Picasso Baby"	Music Video	Won	
AICE & AICP Awards	2018	"Smile"	Music Video	Won	
AICE & AICP Awards	2018	"The Story of O.J."	Music Video	Won	
AICE & AICP Awards	2018	"The Story of O.J."	Motion Design and Graphics	Nominated	
AICE & AICP Awards	2019	"Apeshit" (with Beyoncé)	Music Video	Won	
American Music Awards	2000	Jay-Z	Favorite Rap/Hip Hop Artist	Nominated	
American Music Awards	2004	Jay-Z	Favorite Rap/Hip Hop Artist	Won	
American Music Awards	2004	The Black Album	Favorite Rap/Hip Hop Album	Nominated	
American Music Awards	2008	American Gangster	Favorite Rap/Hip Hop Album	Nominated	
American Music Awards	2009	Jay-Z	Favorite Rap/Hip Hop Artist	Won	
American Music Awards	2009	The Blueprint 3	Favorite Rap/Hip Hop Album	Won	
American Music Awards	2011	Watch The Throne (with Kanye West)	Favorite Rap/Hip-Hop Album	Nominated	
American Music Awards	2013	Jay-Z	Favorite Rap/Hip-Hop Artist	Nominated	
American Music Awards	2013	Magna Carta... Holy Grail	Favorite Rap/Hip-Hop Album	Nominated	
American Music Awards	2018	On the Run II Tour (with Beyoncé)	Tour of the Year	Nominated	
ASCAP Pop Music Award	2004	Crazy in Love (ft. Beyoncé)	Most Performed Song	Won	
ASCAP Pop Music Award	2005	"Baby Boy"	Most Performed Song	Won	
ASCAP Pop Music Award	2005	"Dirt Off Your Shoulder"	Most Performed Song	Won	
ASCAP Pop Music Award	2008	"Umbrella"	Most Performed Song	Won	
ASCAP Pop Music Award	2010	"Run This Town (ft. Rihanna & Kanye West)"	Most Performed Song	Won	
ASCAP Pop Music Award	2010	"Empire State of Mind (ft. Alicia Keys)"	Most Performed Song	Won	
ASCAP Pop Music Award	2015	"Drunk in Love (ft. Beyoncé)"	Most Performed Song	Won	
ASCAP Rhythm & Soul Music Awards	1999	"Money Ain't A Thang"	Award Winning R&B/Hip-Hop Songs	Won	
ASCAP Rhythm & Soul Music Awards	2004	Jay-Z	Golden Note Award	Won	
ASCAP Rhythm & Soul Music Awards	2004	"Crazy in Love" (ft. Beyoncé)	Award Winning R&B/Hip-Hop Songs	Won	
ASCAP Rhythm & Soul Music Awards	2005	"Dirt Off Your Shoulder"	Award Winning R&B/Hip-Hop Songs	Won	
ASCAP Rhythm & Soul Music Awards	2005	"Dirt Off Your Shoulder"	Award Winning Rap Songs	Won	
ASCAP Rhythm & Soul Music Awards	2006	"Bring Em Out"	Award Winning R&B/Hip-Hop Songs	Won	
ASCAP Rhythm & Soul Music Awards	2006	"I'm A Hustla"	Award Winning R&B/Hip-Hop Songs	Won	
ASCAP Rhythm & Soul Music Awards	2006	"Bring Em Out"	Award Winning Rap Songs	Won	
ASCAP Rhythm & Soul Music Awards	2007	"Enough Cryin"	Award Winning R&B/Hip-Hop Songs	Won	
ASCAP Rhythm & Soul Music Awards	2010	"Run This Town" (ft. Rihanna & Kanye West)	Award Winning Rap Songs	Won	
ASCAP Rhythm & Soul Music Awards	2011	"Empire State of Mind	Award Winning Rap Songs	Won	
ASCAP Rhythm & Soul Music Awards	2012	"Niggas In Paris" (ft. Kanye West)	Award Winning R&B/Hip-Hop Songs	Won	
ASCAP Rhythm & Soul Music Awards	2012	"Otis" (ft. Kanye West)	Award Winning R&B/Hip-Hop Songs	Won	
ASCAP Rhythm & Soul Music Awards	2013	"Niggas In Paris" (ft. Kanye West)	Award Winning R&B/Hip-Hop Songs	Won	
ASCAP Rhythm & Soul Music Awards	2013	"Niggas In Paris" (ft. Kanye West)	Award Winning Rap Songs	Won	
ASCAP Rhythm & Soul Music Awards	2014	"Clique" (ft. Kanye West & Big Sean)	Award Winning R&B/Hip-Hop Songs	Won	
ASCAP Rhythm & Soul Music Awards	2014	"Holy Grail"	Award Winning R&B/Hip-Hop Songs	Won	
ASCAP Rhythm & Soul Music Awards	2014	"Tom Ford"	Award Winning R&B/Hip-Hop Songs	Won	
ASCAP Rhythm & Soul Music Awards	2014	"Suit & Tie"	Award Winning R&B/Hip-Hop Songs	Won	
ASCAP Rhythm & Soul Music Awards	2014	"Holy Grail"	Top Rap Song	Won	
ASCAP Rhythm & Soul Music Awards	2015	"Drunk in Love" (ft. Beyoncé)	Top R&B/Hip-Hop Songs	Won	
ASCAP Rhythm & Soul Music Awards	2015	"Part II (On the Run)"	Award Winning R&B/Hip-Hop Songs	Won	
ASCAP Rhythm & Soul Music Awards	2015	"The Worst"	Award Winning R&B/Hip-Hop Songs	Won	
ASCAP Rhythm & Soul Music Awards	2015	"Tom Ford"	Award Winning R&B/Hip-Hop Songs	Won	
ASCAP Rhythm & Soul Music Awards	2015	"Part II (On the Run)"	Award Winning Rap Songs	Won	
ASCAP Rhythm & Soul Music Awards	2015	Jay-Z	Songwriter of the Year	Won	
ASCAP Rhythm & Soul Music Awards	2017	"I Got the Keys" (ft. DJ Khaled & Future)	Award Winning R&B/Hip-Hop Songs	Won	
ASCAP Rhythm & Soul Music Awards	2017	"All the Way Up" (ft. Joe, Remy Ma, French Montana & Infared)	Award Winning R&B/Hip-Hop Songs	Won	
ASCAP Rhythm & Soul Music Awards	2017	"All the Way Up" (ft. Joe, Remy Ma, French Montana & Infared)	Award Winning Rap Songs	Won	
ASCAP Rhythm & Soul Music Awards	2018	"Shining (ft. Beyoncé & DJ Khaled)	Award Winning R&B/Hip-Hop Songs	Won	
ASCAP Rhythm & Soul Music Awards	2019	"Apeshit"	Award Winning R&B/Hip-Hop Songs	Won	
ASCAP Rhythm & Soul Music Awards	2021	"Savage (Remix)"	Award Winning R&B/Hip-Hop Songs	Won	
BET Awards	2001	Jay-Z	Best Male Hip Hop Artist	Won	
BET Awards	2001	"I Just Wanna Luv U (Give It 2 Me)"	Viewer's Choice	Won	
BET Awards	2002	Jay-Z	Best Male Hip Hop Artist	Won	
BET Awards	2003	Jay-Z	Best Male Hip Hop Artist	Nominated	
BET Awards	2003	"03 Bonnie & Clyde (featuring Beyoncé)"	Best Collaboration	Nominated	
BET Awards	2004	Jay-Z	Best Male Hip Hop Artist	Won	
BET Awards	2004	"Crazy in Love" (with Beyoncé)	Video of the Year	Nominated	
BET Awards	2004	"Crazy in Love" (with Beyoncé)	Viewer's Choice	Nominated	
BET Awards	2004	"Crazy in Love" (with Beyoncé)	Best Collaboration	Won	
BET Awards	2007	"Upgrade U (with Beyoncé)"	Best Collaboration	Nominated	
BET Awards	2007	"Déjà Vu (with Beyoncé)"	Best Collaboration	Nominated	
BET Awards	2007	Jay-Z	Best Male Hip Hop Artist	Nominated	
BET Awards	2008	Jay-Z	Best Male Hip Hop Artist	Nominated	
BET Awards	2010	Jay-Z	Best Male Hip Hop Artist	Nominated	
BET Awards	2010	"Empire State of Mind (featuring Alicia Keys)"	Best Collaboration	Won	
BET Awards	2010	"Empire State of Mind (featuring Alicia Keys)"	Viewer's Choice	Nominated	
BET Awards	2010	"Empire State of Mind (featuring Alicia Keys)"	Video Of The Year	Nominated	
BET Awards	2010	"Run This Town (featuring Rihanna & Kanye West)"	Video Of The Year	Nominated	
BET Awards	2012	"The Throne (Jay-Z & Kanye West)"	Best Group	Won	
BET Awards	2012	"Otis (with Kanye West feat. Otis Redding)"	Best Collaboration	Nominated	
BET Awards	2012	"Otis (with Kanye West feat. Otis Redding)"	Viewer's Choice	Nominated	
BET Awards	2012	"Otis (with Kanye West feat. Otis Redding)"	Video of the Year	Won	
BET Awards	2012	"Niggas in Paris (with Kanye West)"	Video of the Year	Nominated	
BET Awards	2013	"Suit & Tie (feat. Justin Timberlake)"	Video of the Year	Nominated	
BET Awards	2013	"Suit & Tie (feat. Justin Timberlake)"	Best Collaboration	Nominated	
BET Awards	2013	"Suit & Tie (feat. Justin Timberlake)"	Viewer's Choice	Nominated	
BET Awards	2014	"Holy Grail (feat. Justin Timberlake)"	Best Collaboration	Nominated	
BET Awards	2014	"Drunk in Love (feat. Beyoncé)"	Best Collaboration	Won	
BET Awards	2014	"Drunk in Love (feat. Beyoncé)"	Viewer's Choice	Nominated	
BET Awards	2014	"Drunk in Love (feat. Beyoncé)"	Video of the Year	Nominated	
BET Awards	2014	Jay-Z	Best Male Hip Hop Artist	Nominated	
BET Awards	2017	"Shining (feat. Beyoncé & DJ Khaled)"	Best Collaboration	Nominated	
BET Awards	2018	4:44	Album of the Year	Nominated	
BET Awards	2018	"Top Off (feat. Beyoncé, Future, DJ Khaled)"	Best Collaboration	Nominated	
BET Awards	2018	Jay-Z	Best Male Hip Hop Artist	Nominated	
BET Awards	2019	Everything Is Love	Album of the Year	Nominated	
BET Awards	2019	"Apeshit"	Video of the Year	Nominated	
BET Awards	2019	The Carters	Best Group	Nominated	
BET Hip Hop Awards	2006	Jay-Z	Hip-Hop Hustler of the Year	Won	
BET Hip Hop Awards	2007	Jay-Z	Hot Ticket Performer	Won	
BET Hip Hop Awards	2008	Himself	Best Live Performer	Nominated	
BET Hip Hop Awards	2008	Himself	Lyricist of the Year	Nominated	
BET Hip Hop Awards	2008	Himself	MVP of the Year	Nominated	
BET Hip Hop Awards	2008	Himself	Hustler of the Year	Nominated	
BET Hip Hop Awards	2008	American Gangster	CD of the Year	Nominated	
BET Hip Hop Awards	2009	Himself	Hustler of the Year	Won	
BET Hip Hop Awards	2009	Himself	Best Live Performer	Won	
BET Hip Hop Awards	2009	Himself	Lyricist of the Year	Won	
BET Hip Hop Awards	2009	Himself	MVP of the Year	Won	
BET Hip Hop Awards	2009	Himself	Made-You-Look Award (Best Hip-Hop Style)	Nominated	
BET Hip Hop Awards	2009	"D.O.A. (Death of Auto-Tune)"	Best Hip Hop Video	Nominated	
BET Hip Hop Awards	2010	Himself	Hustler of the Year	Nominated	
BET Hip Hop Awards	2010	Himself	Best Live Performer	Won	
BET Hip Hop Awards	2010	Himself	Lyricist of the Year	Nominated	
BET Hip Hop Awards	2010	Himself	MVP of the Year	Nominated	
BET Hip Hop Awards	2010	Himself	Made-You-Look Award (Best Hip-Hop Style)	Nominated	
BET Hip Hop Awards	2010	"Run This Town" (featuring Rihanna & Kanye West)	Best Hip Hop Video	Nominated	
BET Hip Hop Awards	2010	"On to the Next One" (featuring Swizz Beatz)	Best Hip Hop Video	Nominated	
BET Hip Hop Awards	2010	"Empire State of Mind" (with Alicia Keys)	Best Hip Hop Video	Won	
BET Hip Hop Awards	2010	"Empire State of Mind" (with Alicia Keys)	Reese's Perfect Combo Award	Won	
BET Hip Hop Awards	2010	The Blueprint 3	CD of the Year	Won	
BET Hip Hop Awards	2011	Himself	Hustler of the Year	Won	
BET Hip Hop Awards	2011	Himself	Lyricist of the Year	Nominated	
BET Hip Hop Awards	2011	Himself	Made-You-Look Award (Best Hip-Hop Style)	Nominated	
BET Hip Hop Awards	2011	Himself	Best Live Performer	Nominated	
BET Hip Hop Awards	2012	Himself	Hustler of the Year	Won	
BET Hip Hop Awards	2012	Himself	Lyricist of the Year	Nominated	
BET Hip Hop Awards	2012	Himself	MVP of the Year	Nominated	
BET Hip Hop Awards	2012	"The Throne (with Kanye West)"	Best Live Performer	Won	
BET Hip Hop Awards	2012	"Ni**as in Paris" (with Kanye West as The Throne)	Best Club Banger	Won	
BET Hip Hop Awards	2012	Watch the Throne (with Kanye West as The Throne)	CD of the Year	Won	
BET Hip Hop Awards	2012	"Murder to Excellence" (with Kanye West as The Throne)	Impact Track	Nominated	
BET Hip Hop Awards	2012	"Otis" (with Kanye West as The Throne)	People's Champ Award	Nominated	
BET Hip Hop Awards	2013	Himself	Hustler of the Year	Won	
BET Hip Hop Awards	2013	Himself	Best Live Performer	Won	
BET Hip Hop Awards	2013	Himself	Lyricist of the Year	Nominated	
BET Hip Hop Awards	2013	Himself	MVP of the Year	Nominated	
BET Hip Hop Awards	2013	Magna Carta Holy Grail	Album of the Year	Nominated	
BET Hip Hop Awards	2013	"Holy Grail" (featuring Justin Timberlake)	Impact Track	Nominated	
BET Hip Hop Awards	2014	"Holy Grail" (featuring Justin Timberlake)	Best Collabo, Duo or Group	Nominated	
BET Hip Hop Awards	2014	Himself	Best Live Performer	Nominated	
BET Hip Hop Awards	2014	Himself	Lyricist of the Year	Nominated	
BET Hip Hop Awards	2014	Himself	MVP of the Year	Nominated	
BET Hip Hop Awards	2014	Himself	Made-You-Look Award (Best Hip Hop Style)	Nominated	
BET Hip Hop Awards	2014	Himself	Hustler of the Year	Nominated	
BET Hip Hop Awards	2015	Himself	Hustler of the Year	Nominated	
BET Hip Hop Awards	2016	"I Got the Keys" (with DJ Khaled & Future)	Best Hip Hop Video	Nominated	
BET Hip Hop Awards	2016	"I Got the Keys" (with DJ Khaled & Future)	Best Collabo, Duo or Group	Nominated	
BET Hip Hop Awards	2016	Himself	Hustler of the Year	Nominated	
BET Hip Hop Awards	2016	"Spiritual"	Impact Track	Nominated	
BET Hip Hop Awards	2017	"The Story of O.J."	Impact Track	Won	
BET Hip Hop Awards	2017	Himself	MVP of the Year	Nominated	
BET Hip Hop Awards	2017	Himself	Hustler of the Year	Nominated	
BET Hip Hop Awards	2017	Himself	Lyricist of the Year	Nominated	
BET Hip Hop Awards	2017	4:44	Album of the Year	Nominated	
BET Hip Hop Awards	2018	"Apeshit" (The Carters)	Single of the Year	Won	
BET Hip Hop Awards	2018	"Apeshit" (The Carters)	Best Collabo, Duo or Group	Won	
BET Hip Hop Awards	2018	Everything Is Love	Album of the Year	Won	
BET Hip Hop Awards	2018	Jay-Z	Hustler of the Year	Nominated	
BET Hip Hop Awards	2019	The Carters	Hot Ticket Performer	Nominated	
BET Hip Hop Awards	2019	Jay-Z	Hustler of the Year	Won	
BET Hip Hop Awards	2021	"What It Feels Like" (featuring Nipsey Hussle)	Sweet 16: Best Featured Verse	Won	
BET Hip Hop Awards	2021	"What It Feels Like" (featuring Nipsey Hussle)	Impact Track	Won	
BET Hip Hop Awards	2023	"God Did"	Sweet 16: Best Featured Verse	Won	
Billboard Music Awards	1998	Jay-Z	R&B Albums Artist of the Year	Won	
Billboard Music Awards	1999	Jay-Z	Male Artist of the Year	Nominated	
Billboard Music Awards	1999	Jay-Z	Rap Artist of the Year	Won	
Billboard Music Awards	1999	Jay-Z	R&B/Hip-Hop Artist of the Year	Nominated	
Billboard Music Awards	2001	"Fiesta"	Top R&B/hip-hop single of the year	Won	
Billboard Music Awards	2002	Jay-Z	Top Male R&B/Hip-Hop Artist	Nominated	
Billboard Music Awards	2002	Jay-Z	R&B/Hip-Hop Albums Artist of the Year	Nominated	
Billboard Music Awards	2002	The Blueprint	Rap Album of the Year	Nominated	
Billboard Music Awards	2002	The Blueprint	R&B/Hip-Hop Album of the Year	Nominated	
Billboard Music Awards	2003	Jay-Z	R&B/Hip-Hop Artist of the Year	Nominated	
Billboard Music Awards	2004	Jay-Z	Rap Artist of the Year	Nominated	
Billboard Music Awards	2004	Jay-Z	R&B/Hip-Hop Albums Artist of the Year	Nominated	
Billboard Music Awards	2004	Jay-Z	R&B/Hip-Hop Singles Artist of the Year	Nominated	
Billboard Music Awards	2004	Jay-Z	R&B/Hip-Hop Male Artist of the Year	Nominated	
Billboard Music Awards	2004	The Black Album	R&B/Hip-Hop Album of the Year	Nominated	
Billboard Music Awards	2004	The Black Album	Rap Album of the Year	Nominated	
Billboard Music Awards	2011	Watch the Throne	Top Rap Album	Nominated	
Billboard Music Awards	2014	Jay-Z	Top Rap Artist	Nominated	
Billboard Music Awards	2014	Magna Carta Holy Grail	Top Rap Album	Nominated	
Billboard Music Awards	2014	"Holy Grail" (with Justin Timberlake)	Top Rap Song	Nominated	
Billboard Music Awards	2014	"Drunk in Love" (with Beyoncé)	Top R&B Song	Nominated	
Billboard Music Awards	2014	"Suit & Tie" (with Justin Timberlake)	Top R&B Song	Nominated	
Billboard Music Awards	2018	Jay-Z	Top Rap Tour	Won	
Billboard Music Awards	2019	The Carters	Top Touring Artist	Nominated	
Billboard Music Awards	2019	The Carters	Top R&B Tour	Won	
Billboard Music Awards	2019	The Carters	Top Rap Tour	Won	
Billboard Touring Awards	2013	"Legends of the Summer Tour"	Top Package	Nominated	
Billboard Touring Awards	2013	Jay-Z	Fans' Choice Awards	Nominated	
Billboard Touring Awards	2018	On The Run II Tour	Top World Tour	Nominated	
Billboard Touring Awards	2018	On The Run II Tour	Top US Tour	Nominated	
Billboard Touring Awards	2018	On The Run II Tour	Top Draw	Nominated	
Black Music & Entertainment Walk of Fame	2021	Jay-Z	Inductee	Nominated	
Black Reel Awards	2011	"Run This Town" (featuring Rihanna & Kanye West)	Best Original or Adapted Song	Nominated	
Black Reel Awards	2013	"No Church in the Wild" (featuring Frank Ocean & Kanye West)	Best Original or Adapted Song	Nominated	
Black Reel Awards	2022	"Guns Go Bang" (featuring Kid Cudi and Jeymes Samuel)	Best Original or Adapted Song	Nominated	
Black Reel Awards	2022	"The Harder They Fall" (featuring Koffee and Jeymes Samuel)	Best Original or Adapted Song	Nominated	
Brit Awards	2009	Jay-Z	International Male Solo Artist	Nominated	
Brit Awards	2010	Jay-Z	International Male Solo Artist	Won	
Brit Awards	2010	The Blueprint 3	International Album	Nominated	
Brit Awards	2012	"The Throne (Jay-Z and Kanye West)"	International Group	Nominated	
Brit Awards	2019	The Carters	International Group	Won	
Cannes Lions International Festival of Creativity	2011	"Decoded Campaign"	Integrated Grand Prix	Won	
Cannes Lions International Festival of Creativity	2011	"Decoded Campaign"	Titanium Lion	Won	
Cannes Lions International Festival of Creativity	2018	"Smile"	Excellence in Music Video	Gran Prix	
Ciclope Festival Awards	2017	"The Story of O.J"	Grand Prix: Music Video	Won	
Ciclope Festival Awards	2017	"The Story of O.J"	Music Video: Editing	Won	
Ciclope Festival Awards	2018	"Smile"	Gold in Music Video Direction	Won	
Ciclope Festival Awards	2018	"Smile"	Gold in Music Video Production Design	Won	
Ciclope Festival Awards	2018	"Smile"	Silver in Music Video Cinematography	Won	
Ciclope Festival Awards	2018	"Smile"	Silver in Music Video Editing	Won	
Clio Awards	2018	"The Story of O.J."	Music Videos	Gold	
Clio Awards	2018	"The Story of O.J."	Other	Silver	
Clio Awards	2018	"The Story of O.J."	Animation	Bronze	
Clio Awards	2018	"Apeshit"	Music Videos	Silver	
Critics' Choice Movie Awards	2022	"Guns Go Bang" (featuring Kid Cudi and Jeymes Samuel)	Best Song	Nominated	
D&AD Awards	2014	"Jay Z Magna Carta Holy Grail App"	Wood Pencil for Digital & Mobile	Won	
D&AD Awards	2018	"The Story of O.J."	Animation for Music Videos	Won	
D&AD Awards	2018	"The Story of O.J."	Music Videos	Won	
D&AD Awards	2018	"Smile"	Music Videos	Won	
Denver Film Critics Society	2022	"Guns Go Bang"	Best Original Song	Nominated	
Dieline Awards	2012	Watch the Throne	Dieline Package Design Award	Won	
Esky Music Awards	2008	Jay-Z	Hall of Fame	Won	
GAFFA Awards (Norway)	2019	The Carters	Best Foreign Group	Nominated	
GAFFA Awards (Sweden)	2013	Magna Carta Holy Grail	Best Foreign Album	Won	
GAFFA Awards (Sweden)	2019	The Carters	Best Foreign Group	Nominated	
GAFFA Awards (Sweden)	2019	"Apeshit"	International Hit of the Year	Nominated	
GAFFA Awards (Sweden)	2019	Everything Is Love	International Album of the Year	Nominated	
Georgia Film Critics Association	2021	"Guns Go Bang"	Best Original Song	Nominated	
GLAAD Media Award	2018	"Smile" featuring Gloria Carter	Special Recognition Award	Won	
GLAAD Media Award	2019	Beyoncé and Jay-Z	Vanguard Award	Won	
GQ Awards	2011	Jay-Z	Man of the Year	Won	
GQ Awards	2012	Jay-Z	Most Stylish Men	Won	
GQ Awards	2015	Jay-Z	Most Stylish Men	Won	
GQ Awards	2020	Jay-Z on vacay	Biggest Fit Of The Year	Won	
Grammy Award	1999	Vol. 2... Hard Knock Life	Best Rap Album	Won	
Grammy Award	1999	"Hard Knock Life (Ghetto Anthem)"	Best Rap Solo Performance	Nominated	
Grammy Award	1999	"Money Ain't a Thang" (with Jermaine Dupri)	Best Rap Performance by a Duo or a Group	Nominated	
Grammy Award	2001	"Big Pimpin'" (featuring UGK)	Best Rap Performance by a Duo or a Group	Nominated	
Grammy Award	2001	Vol. 3... Life and Times of S. Carter	Best Rap Album	Nominated	
Grammy Award	2002	The Blueprint	Best Rap Album	Nominated	
Grammy Award	2002	"Izzo (H.O.V.A.)"	Best Rap Solo Performance	Nominated	
Grammy Award	2002	"Change the Game" (featuring Memphis Bleek, Beanie Sigel and Static Major)	Best Rap Performance by a Duo or a Group	Nominated	
Grammy Award	2003	"Song Cry"	Best Male Rap Solo Performance	Nominated	
Grammy Award	2004	The Blueprint²: The Gift & The Curse	Best Rap Album	Nominated	
Grammy Award	2004	"Crazy in Love" (with Beyoncé)	Record of the Year	Nominated	
Grammy Award	2004	"Crazy in Love" (with Beyoncé)	Best R&B Song	Won	
Grammy Award	2004	"Crazy in Love" (with Beyoncé)	Best Rap/Sung Collaboration	Won	
Grammy Award	2004	"Frontin'" (with Pharrell)	Best Rap/Sung Collaboration	Nominated	
Grammy Award	2004	"Excuse Me Miss" (featuring Pharrell)	Best Rap Song	Nominated	
Grammy Award	2005	"99 Problems"	Best Rap Song	Nominated	
Grammy Award	2005	"99 Problems"	Best Rap Solo Performance	Won	
Grammy Award	2005	The Black Album	Best Rap Album	Nominated	
Grammy Award	2006	"Numb/Encore" (with Linkin Park)	Best Rap/Sung Collaboration	Won	
Grammy Award	2007	"Déjà Vu" (with Beyoncé)	Best Rap/Sung Collaboration	Nominated	
Grammy Award	2007	"Déjà Vu" (with Beyoncé)	Best R&B Song	Nominated	
Grammy Award	2008	"Show Me What You Got"	Best Rap Solo Performance	Nominated	
Grammy Award	2008	"Umbrella" (with Rihanna)	Record of the Year	Nominated	
Grammy Award	2008	"Umbrella" (with Rihanna)	Song of the Year	Nominated	
Grammy Award	2008	"Umbrella" (with Rihanna)	Best Rap/Sung Collaboration	Won	
Grammy Award	2008	Kingdom Come	Best Rap Album	Nominated	
Grammy Award	2009	American Gangster	Best Rap Album	Nominated	
Grammy Award	2009	"Roc Boys (And the Winner Is)..."	Best Rap Solo Performance	Nominated	
Grammy Award	2009	Tha Carter III (as featured artist)	Album of the Year	Nominated	
Grammy Award	2009	"Swagga Like Us" (with T.I., Kanye West and Lil Wayne)	Best Rap Song	Nominated	
Grammy Award	2009	"Swagga Like Us" (with T.I., Kanye West and Lil Wayne)	Best Rap Performance by a Duo or a Group	Won	
Grammy Award	2009	"Mr. Carter" (with Lil Wayne)	Best Rap Performance by a Duo or a Group	Nominated	
Grammy Award	2010	"Money Goes, Honey Stay" (with Fabolous)	Best Rap Performance by a Duo or a Group	Nominated	
Grammy Award	2010	"D.O.A. (Death of Auto-Tune)"	Best Rap Solo Performance	Won	
Grammy Award	2010	"D.O.A. (Death of Auto-Tune)"	Best Rap Song	Nominated	
Grammy Award	2010	"Run This Town" (featuring Rihanna and Kanye West)	Best Rap Song	Won	
Grammy Award	2010	"Run This Town" (featuring Rihanna and Kanye West)	Best Rap/Sung Collaboration	Won	
Grammy Award	2011	"Empire State of Mind" (featuring Alicia Keys)	Best Rap/Sung Collaboration	Won	
Grammy Award	2011	"Empire State of Mind" (featuring Alicia Keys)	Record of the Year	Nominated	
Grammy Award	2011	"Empire State of Mind" (featuring Alicia Keys)	Best Rap Song	Won	
Grammy Award	2011	"On to the Next One" (featuring Swizz Beatz)	Best Rap Song	Nominated	
Grammy Award	2011	"On to the Next One" (featuring Swizz Beatz)	Best Rap Performance by a Duo or a Group	Won	
Grammy Award	2011	The Blueprint 3	Best Rap Album	Nominated	
Grammy Award	2012	Watch The Throne (with Kanye West)	Best Rap Album	Nominated	
Grammy Award	2012	"Otis" (with Kanye West)	Best Rap Song	Nominated	
Grammy Award	2012	"Otis" (with Kanye West)	Best Rap Performance	Won	
Grammy Award	2013	"I Do" (with Young Jeezy & André 3000)	Best Rap Performance	Nominated	
Grammy Award	2013	"Niggas in Paris" (with Kanye West)	Best Rap Performance	Won	
Grammy Award	2013	"Niggas in Paris" (with Kanye West)	Best Rap Song	Won	
Grammy Award	2013	"No Church in the Wild" (with Kanye West, Frank Ocean & The-Dream)	Best Short Form Music Video	Nominated	
Grammy Award	2013	"No Church in the Wild" (with Kanye West, Frank Ocean & The-Dream)	Best Rap/Sung Collaboration	Won	
Grammy Award	2013	"Talk That Talk" (with Rihanna)	Best Rap/Sung Collaboration	Nominated	
Grammy Award	2014	"Part II (On the Run)" (featuring Beyoncé)	Best Rap/Sung Collaboration	Nominated	
Grammy Award	2014	"Holy Grail" (featuring Justin Timberlake)	Best Rap/Sung Collaboration	Won	
Grammy Award	2014	"Holy Grail" (featuring Justin Timberlake)	Best Rap Song	Nominated	
Grammy Award	2014	Magna Carta Holy Grail	Best Rap Album	Nominated	
Grammy Award	2014	"Tom Ford"	Best Rap Performance	Nominated	
Grammy Award	2014	"Suit & Tie" (with Justin Timberlake)	Best Pop Duo/Group Performance	Nominated	
Grammy Award	2014	"Suit & Tie" (with Justin Timberlake)	Best Music Video	Won	
Grammy Award	2014	"Picasso Baby: A Performance Art Film"	Best Music Video	Nominated	
Grammy Award	2014	Good Kid, M.A.A.D City (as featured artist)	Album of the Year	Nominated	
Grammy Award	2015	Beyoncé (as featured artist)	Album of the Year	Nominated	
Grammy Award	2015	"Drunk in Love" (with Beyoncé)	Best R&B Performance	Won	
Grammy Award	2015	"Drunk in Love" (with Beyoncé)	Best R&B Song	Won	
Grammy Award	2015	On the Run Tour: Beyoncé and Jay-Z	Best Music Film	Nominated	
Grammy Award	2017	"Pop Style" (with Drake & Kanye West)	Best Rap Performance	Nominated	
Grammy Award	2018	4:44	Album of the Year	Nominated	
Grammy Award	2018	4:44	Best Rap Album	Nominated	
Grammy Award	2018	"The Story of O.J."	Record of the Year	Nominated	
Grammy Award	2018	"The Story of O.J."	Best Rap Song	Nominated	
Grammy Award	2018	"The Story of O.J."	Best Music Video	Nominated	
Grammy Award	2018	"4:44"	Song of the Year	Nominated	
Grammy Award	2018	"4:44"	Best Rap Performance	Nominated	
Grammy Award	2018	"Family Feud" (feat. Beyoncé)	Best Rap/Sung Performance	Nominated	
Grammy Award	2018	Jay-Z	Salute to Industry Icons Award	Won	
Grammy Award	2019	"Summer" (with Beyoncé as The Carters)	Best R&B Performance	Nominated	
Grammy Award	2019	"Apeshit" (with Beyonce as The Carters)	Best Music Video	Nominated	
Grammy Award	2019	Everything Is Love (with Beyoncé as The Carters)	Best Urban Contemporary Album	Won	
Grammy Award	2021	"Black Parade" (as songwriter)	Song of the Year	Nominated	
Grammy Award	2021	"Black Parade" (as songwriter)	Best R&B Song	Nominated	
Grammy Award	2021	"Savage" (as songwriter)	Best Rap Song	Won	
Grammy Award	2022	"Bath Salts" (DMX featuring Jay-Z and Nas)	Best Rap Song	Nominated	N/A
Grammy Award	2022	"Jail" (Kanye West featuring Jay-Z)	Best Rap Song	Won	N/A
Grammy Award	2022	Donda (as featured artist and songwriter)	Album of the Year	Nominated	N/A
Grammy Award	2023	Renaissance (as a songwriter)	Album of the Year	Nominated	N/A
Grammy Award	2023	"Break My Soul" (as a songwriter)	Song of the Year	Nominated	N/A
Grammy Award	2023	"God Did" (with DJ Khaled, Rick Ross, Lil Wayne, John Legend and Fridayy)	Song of the Year	Nominated	N/A
Grammy Award	2023	"God Did" (with DJ Khaled, Rick Ross, Lil Wayne, John Legend and Fridayy)	Best Rap Performance	Nominated	N/A
Grammy Award	2023	"God Did" (with DJ Khaled, Rick Ross, Lil Wayne, John Legend and Fridayy)	Best Rap Song	Nominated	N/A
Grammy Award	2024	Himself	Global Impact Award	Honored	
Grammy Award	2025	Cowboy Carter (as a songwriter)	Album of the Year	Won	
Grammy Hall of Fame	2025	Reasonable Doubt	Inducted	Won	
Guys' Choice Award	2007	Jay-Z	Sickest Rhymes	Won	
HipHop.de Awards	2011	Watch the Throne	Best International Album	Won	
HipHop.de Awards	2012	Watch the Throne	Best Live Act International	Won	
HipHop.de Awards	2012	Jay-Z	Best Life Work	Won	
HipHop.de Awards	2013	Jay-Z	Best Live Act International	Won	
HipHop.de Awards	2013	Holy Grail	Best International Song	Won	
HipHop.de Awards	2017	The Story of OJ	Best International Video	Won	
HipHop.de Awards	2018	The Carters	Best Live Act International	Won	
HipHopDX Awards	2010	"Jay-Z & Eminem: Home and Home"	Tour/Concert of the Year	Won	
HipHopDX Awards	2010	"Kanye West f. Rick Ross, Jay-Z, Nicki Minaj & Bon Iver – “Monster”"	Collaboration of the Year	Won	
HipHopDX Awards	2011	"Watch the Throne Tour"	Tour of the Year	Won	
HipHopDX Awards	2013	"Jay-Z and Dame Dash"	Instagram of the Year	Won	
HipHopDX Awards	2017	"Jay-Z"	Comeback of the Year	Won	
Hip-Hop Summit Action Network (HSAN) Action Award	2003	Jay-Z	Action Award	Won	
Hollywood Music in Media Awards	2021	"Guns Go Bang" (with Kid Cudi and Jeymes Samuel)	Best Original Song in a Feature Film	Nominated	
Houston Film Critics Society Awards	2021	"Guns Go Bang"	Best Original Song	Nominated	
IFPI Hong Kong Top Sales Music Awards	2005	Collision Course	Top 10 Best Selling Foreign Albums	Won	
iHeartRadio Music Awards	2015	"Drunk in Love" (feat. Beyoncé)"	Hip Hop / R&B Song of the Year	Nominated	
iHeartRadio MMVAs	2019	"Apeshit"	Fan Fave Video	Nominated	
iHeartRadio MMVAs	2019	"Apeshit"	Best Direction	Nominated	
iHeartRadio MMVAs	2019	The Carters	Best Hip Hop Artist or Group	Nominated	
IIE Gala	2014	"Shawn Carter Foundation"	Honoree	Won	
International Dance Music Awards	2001	"Numb/Encore" (feat. Linkin Park)	Best Alternative/Rock Dance Track	Nominated	
International Dance Music Awards	2004	"Crazy in Love" (feat. Beyoncé)	Best R&B/Urban Dance Track	Won	
International Dance Music Awards	2007	"Déjà Vu" (feat. Beyoncé)	Best R&B/Urban Dance Track	Nominated	
International Dance Music Awards	2007	"Déjà Vu" (feat. Beyoncé)	Best Pop Dance Track	Nominated	
International Dance Music Awards	2008	"Umbrella" (feat. Rihanna)	Best R&B/Urban Dance Track	Won	
International Dance Music Awards	2010	"Empire State of Mind" (feat. Alicia Keys)	Best Hip Hop Dance Track	Nominated	
International Dance Music Awards	2010	"Run This Town" (feat. Rihanna and Kanye West)	Best Hip Hop Dance Track	Nominated	
International Documentary Association	2017	TIME: The Kalief Browder Story	Best Limited Series	Nominated	
Iowa Film Critics Awards	2022	"The Harder They Fall"	Best Song	Won	
Iowa Film Critics Awards	2021	"Guns Go Bang"	Best Song	Won	
J-Wave Tokio Awards	2003	"Crazy In Love" (with Beyoncé)	Best Song	Won	
Key Art Awards	2013	"The Great Gatsby"	Best Audio/Visual Technique	Nominated	
London International Awards	2017	"The Story of O.J. "	Music Video	GRAND LIA	
London International Awards	2017	"The Story of O.J. "	Best Music Video: Animation	Gold	
London International Awards	2017	"The Story of O.J. "	Best Cel Animation	Gold	
London International Awards	2017	"The Story of O.J. "	Music Video: Best Music Video	Gold	
Mobo Awards	1999	Jay-Z	Best International Act	Nominated	
Mobo Awards	1999	Jay-Z	Best International Hip-Hop Act	Won	
Mobo Awards	1999	"Hard Knock Life (Ghetto Anthem)"	Best International Single	Nominated	
Mobo Awards	2003	Jay-Z	Best Hip-Hop	Nominated	
Mobo Awards	2003	"Crazy In Love" (with Beyoncé)	Best Song	Nominated	
Mobo Awards	2003	"Crazy In Love" (with Beyoncé)	Best Video	Nominated	
Mobo Awards	2004	Jay-Z	Best Hip-Hop	Nominated	
Mobo Awards	2004	The Black Album	Best Album	Nominated	
Mobo Awards	2004	"99 Problems"	Best Video	Nominated	
Mobo Awards	2006	Jay-Z	Best International Male Artist	Won	
Mobo Awards	2006	"Déjà Vu" (with Beyoncé)	Best Song	Won	
Mobo Awards	2006	"Déjà Vu" (with Beyoncé)	Best Video	Won	
Mobo Awards	2007	"Umbrella" (with Rihanna)	Best Video	Nominated	
Mobo Awards	2008	Jay-Z	Best Hip-Hop	Nominated	
Mobo Awards	2009	Jay-Z	Best International Act	Nominated	
Mobo Awards	2010	Jay-Z	Best International Act	Nominated	
Mobo Awards	2013	Jay-Z	Best International Act	Nominated	
Mobo Awards	2017	Jay-Z	Best International Act	Nominated	
MTV Europe Music Awards	2003	"Crazy in Love (Beyoncé Knowles song)	Best Song	Won	
MTV Europe Music Awards	2003	Jay-Z	Best Hip-Hop	Nominated	
MTV Europe Music Awards	2004	"99 Problems"	Best Video	Nominated	
MTV Europe Music Awards	2004	Jay-Z	Best Male	Nominated	
MTV Europe Music Awards	2004	Jay-Z	Best Hip-Hop	Nominated	
MTV Europe Music Awards	2007	"Umbrella" with Rihanna	Most Addictive Track	Nominated	
MTV Europe Music Awards	2009	Jay-Z	Best Male	Nominated	
MTV Europe Music Awards	2009	Jay-Z	Best Urban	Won	
MTV Europe Music Awards	2011	Jay-Z & Kanye West	Best Hip-Hop	Nominated	
MTV Europe Music Awards	2012	Jay-Z & Kanye West	Best Hip-Hop	Nominated	
MTV Europe Music Awards	2012	Jay-Z & Kanye West	Best Live	Nominated	
MTV Video Music Awards	1999	"Can I Get A..." (with Ja Rule and Amil)	Best Rap Video	Won	
MTV Video Music Awards	1999	"Can I Get A..." (with Ja Rule and Amil)	Best Video from a Film	Nominated	
MTV Video Music Awards	1999	"Can I Get A..." (with Ja Rule and Amil)	Viewer's Choice Award	Nominated	
MTV Video Music Awards	2000	"Big Pimpin'" (with UGK)	Best Rap Video	Nominated	
MTV Video Music Awards	2001	"I Just Wanna Love U (Give It 2 Me)"	Best Hip-Hop Video	Nominated	
MTV Video Music Awards	2003	"'03 Bonnie & Clyde" (with Beyoncé)	Best Hip-Hop Video	Nominated	
MTV Video Music Awards	2003	"Crazy in Love" (with Beyoncé)	Best Female Video	Won	
MTV Video Music Awards	2003	"Crazy in Love" (with Beyoncé)	Best R&B Video	Won	
MTV Video Music Awards	2003	"Crazy in Love" (with Beyoncé)	Best Choreography	Won	
MTV Video Music Awards	2004	"99 Problems"	Video of the Year	Nominated	
MTV Video Music Awards	2004	"99 Problems"	Best Male Video	Nominated	
MTV Video Music Awards	2004	"99 Problems"	Best Rap Video	Won	
MTV Video Music Awards	2004	"99 Problems"	Best Direction in a Video	Won	
MTV Video Music Awards	2004	"99 Problems"	Best Editing in a Video	Won	
MTV Video Music Awards	2004	"99 Problems"	Best Cinematography in a Video	Won	
MTV Video Music Awards	2007	Umbrella	Video of the Year	Won	
MTV Video Music Awards	2007	Umbrella	Monster Single of the Year	Won	
MTV Video Music Awards	2007	Jay-Z	Quadruple Threat of the Year	Nominated	
MTV Video Music Awards	2009	"D.O.A. (Death of Auto-Tune)"	Best Male Video	Nominated	
MTV Video Music Awards	2009	"D.O.A. (Death of Auto-Tune)"	Best Hip-Hop Video	Nominated	
MTV Video Music Awards	2010	"On to the Next One" (featuring Swizz Beatz)	Best Hip-Hop Video	Nominated	
MTV Video Music Awards	2010	"Empire State of Mind" (with Alicia Keys)	Best Collaboration	Nominated	
MTV Video Music Awards	2010	"Empire State of Mind" (with Alicia Keys)	Best Direction	Nominated	
MTV Video Music Awards	2010	"Empire State of Mind" (with Alicia Keys)	Best Cinematography	Won	
MTV Video Music Awards	2012	"Niggas in Paris" (with Kanye West)	Best Hip-Hop Video	Nominated	
MTV Video Music Awards	2012	"Niggas in Paris" (with Kanye West)	Best Editing	Nominated	
MTV Video Music Awards	2012	"Otis" (with Kanye West)	Best Direction	Nominated	
MTV Video Music Awards	2014	"Drunk in Love" (with Beyoncé)	Video of the Year	Nominated	
MTV Video Music Awards	2014	"Drunk in Love" (with Beyoncé)	Best Collaboration	Won	
MTV Video Music Awards	2018	"Apeshit"	Video of the Year	Nominated	
MTV Video Music Awards	2018	"Apeshit"	Best Collaboration	Nominated	
MTV Video Music Awards	2018	"Apeshit"	Best Hip-Hop Video	Nominated	
MTV Video Music Awards	2018	"Apeshit"	Best Cinematography in a Video	Won	
MTV Video Music Awards	2018	"Apeshit"	Best Editing in a Video	Nominated	
MTV Video Music Awards	2018	"Apeshit"	Best Direction in a Video	Nominated	
MTV Video Music Awards	2018	"Apeshit"	Best Choreography in a Video	Nominated	
MTV Video Music Awards	2018	"Apeshit"	Best Art Direction	Won	
MTV Video Music Awards Japan	2002	Jay-Z	Best Hip-Hop Artist	Nominated	
MTV Video Music Awards Japan	2002	Jay-Z	Best Live Performance	Nominated	
MTV Video Music Awards Japan	2002	Jay-Z	Inspiration Award International	Won	
MTV Video Music Awards Japan	2004	"Frontin'" Pharrell featuring Jay-Z	Best Male Video	Won	
MTV Video Music Awards Japan	2004	"Change Clothes" Jay-Z featuring Pharrell	Best Hip-Hop Video	Nominated	
MTV Video Music Awards Japan	2004	"Crazy In Love" Beyoncé featuring Jay-Z	Best Female Video	Nominated	
MTV Video Music Awards Japan	2004	"Crazy In Love" Beyoncé featuring Jay-Z	Best Collaboration	Won	
MTV Video Music Awards Japan	2005	"Numb/Encore" with Linkin Park	Best Collaboration	Won	
MTV Video Music Awards Japan	2007	"Show Me What You Got"	Best Hip-Hop Video	Nominated	
MTV Video Music Awards Japan	2008	"Umbrella" Rihanna featuring Jay-Z	Video Of The Year	Nominated	
MTV Video Music Awards Japan	2014	"Drunk in Love" Beyoncé featuring Jay-Z	Best Female Video	Nominated	
MTV Video Music Awards Japan	2014	"Drunk in Love" Beyoncé featuring Jay-Z	Best R&B Video	Nominated	
MTV Movie & TV Awards	1999	"Can I Get A..." (from Rush Hour)	Best Song from a Movie	Nominated	
MTV Movie & TV Awards	2018	Jay-Z's Footnotes for 4:44	Best Music Documentary	Nominated	
MTV TRL Awards	2004	Jay-Z	Retirement Award	Won	
MuchMusic Video Awards	2004	"Crazy in Love" (feat. Beyoncé)	Best International Artist Video	Won	
MuchMusic Video Awards	2004	"Crazy in Love" (feat. Beyoncé)	Favourite International Artist	Nominated	
MuchMusic Video Awards	2007	"Umbrella" (feat. Rihanna)	Best International Artist Video	Nominated	
MuchMusic Video Awards	2008	"Umbrella" (feat. Rihanna)	Most Watched Video	Won	
MuchMusic Video Awards	2014	"Drunk in Love" (feat. Beyoncé)	Best International Artist Video	Nominated	
Music Video Production Awards	2002	"Guilty Until Proven Innocent"	Rap Video of the Year	Won	
Music Video Production Awards	2004	"Crazy in Love" (feat. Beyoncé)	Video of the Year	Nominated	
Music Video Production Awards	2004	"Crazy in Love" (feat. Beyoncé)	Best R&B Video	Won	
Music Video Production Awards	2004	"Crazy in Love" (feat. Beyoncé)	Direction of a Female Artist	Nominated	
Music Video Production Awards	2004	"Crazy in Love" (feat. Beyoncé)	Best Choreography	Won	
Music Video Production Awards	2004	"Crazy in Love" (feat. Beyoncé)	Best Colorist	Won	
Music Video Production Awards	2004	"Crazy in Love" (feat. Beyoncé)	Best Hair	Nominated	
Music Video Production Awards	2005	"99 Problems"	Video of the Year	Won	
Music Video Production Awards	2005	"99 Problems"	Best Direction of a Male Artist	Won	
Music Video Production Awards	2005	"99 Problems"	Hip-Hop Video of the Year	Won	
Music Video Production Awards	2007	"Deja Vu"	Best R&B Video	Won	
Music Video Production Awards	2013	"Suit & Tie"	Best Direction of a Male Artist	Won	
Music Video Production Awards	2013	"Suit & Tie"	Best Cinematography	Won	
Music Vision CADS Award	2004	"Crazy in Love"	Video of the Year	Won	
Music Vision CADS Award	2004	"Crazy in Love"	Best Urban Video	Won	
NAACP Image Awards	2004	"Crazy in Love" (with Beyoncé)	Outstanding Song	Nominated	
NAACP Image Awards	2004	"Crazy in Love" (with Beyoncé)	Outstanding Music Video	Nominated	
NAACP Image Awards	2006	Jay-Z	Outstanding Male Artist	Nominated	
NAACP Image Awards	2006	"Show Me What You Got"	Outstanding Music Video	Nominated	
NAACP Image Awards	2009	"Umbrella" (with Rihanna)	Outstanding Song	Nominated	
NAACP Image Awards	2010	Jay-Z	Outstanding Male Artist	Nominated	
NAACP Image Awards	2010	"Run This Town" (with Rihanna & Kanye West)	Outstanding Duo, Group or Collaboration	Nominated	
NAACP Image Awards	2010	"Empire State of Mind" (with Alicia Keys)	Outstanding Duo, Group or Collaboration	Nominated	
NAACP Image Awards	2010	"Empire State of Mind" (with Alicia Keys)	Outstanding Song	Nominated	
NAACP Image Awards	2010	The Blueprint 3	Outstanding Album	Nominated	
NAACP Image Awards	2011	Jay-Z	Outstanding Male Artist	Nominated	
NAACP Image Awards	2014	"Suit & Tie" (with Justin Timberlake)	Outstanding Duo, Group or Collaboration	Nominated	
NAACP Image Awards	2017	Jay-Z	Entertainer of the Year	Nominated	
NAACP Image Awards	2017	Jay-Z	Outstanding Male Artist	Nominated	
NAACP Image Awards	2017	4:44	Outstanding Music Video	Nominated	
NAACP Image Awards	2017	4:44	Outstanding Album	Nominated	
NAACP Image Awards	2017	"The Story of O.J."	Outstanding Song	Nominated	
NAACP Image Awards	2019	Jay-Z	President's Award	Won	
NAACP Image Awards	2019	"Apeshit"	Outstanding Music Video/Visual Album	Nominated	
NAACP Image Awards	2019	Everything Is Love	Outstanding Album	Nominated	
NAACP Image Awards	2019	Everything Is Love	Outstanding Duo, Group or Collaboration	Nominated	
NAACP Image Awards	2022	The Harder They Fall Soundtrack	Outstanding Soundtrack/Compilation Album	Won	
National Recording Registry	2019	“The Blueprint”	Inducted	Inducted	
New York Awards	1999	Jay-Z	Music	Won	
New York Police & Fire Widows’ & Children's Benefit Fund	2010	Jay-Z	Honoree	Won	
Nickelodeon Kids' Choice Awards	2004	"Crazy in Love" (feat. Beyoncé)	Favorite Song	Nominated	
Nickelodeon Kids' Choice Awards	2010	Jay-Z	Favorite Male Singer	Won	
Nickelodeon Kids' Choice Awards	2011	Jay-Z	Favorite Male Singer	Nominated	
NME Awards	2010	Jay-Z at Alexandra Palace	Best Live Event	Nominated	
NME Awards	2011	Decoded	Best Book	Nominated	
NME Awards	2012	Watch The Throne	Best Album Artwork	Nominated	
One Show Awards	2011	"DECODE JAY-Z WITH BING"	Out Of Home / Campaign	Gold	
One Show Awards	2018	"Smile"	Craft - Direction / Single	Won	
Online Film & Television Association	2021	"Guns Go Bang"	Best Original Song	Nominated	
Peabody Award	2018	Time: The Kalief Browder Story	Honoree	Won	
People's Choice Awards	2010	"Run This Town" (with Rihanna & Kanye West)	Favorite Music Collaboration	Won	
People's Choice Awards	2010	Jay-Z	Favorite Hip-Hop Artist	Nominated	
People's Choice Awards	2012	Jay-Z	Favorite Hip-Hop Artist	Nominated	
People's Choice Awards	2013	Jay-Z	Favorite Hip-Hop Artist	Nominated	
People's Choice Awards	2014	Jay-Z	Favorite Hip-Hop Artist	Nominated	
People's Choice Awards	2018	"On the Run II Tour" (with Beyoncé)	Concert Tour of the Year	Nominated	
Pollstar Awards	2015	On the Run Tour	Major Tour of the Year	Nominated	
Pollstar Awards	2018	On The Run II Tour	Best Hip-Hop/R&B	Won	
Pollstar Awards	2018	On The Run II Tour	Major Tour of the Year	Nominated	
Pop Awards	2018	Jay-Z	Artist Of The Year Award	Nominated	
Pop Awards	2019	The Carters	Artist Of The Year Award	Won	
Porin Award	2004	"Crazy in Love"	Best Foreign Song	Won	
Primetime Emmy Awards	2015	On the Run Tour: Beyoncé and Jay-Z	Outstanding Special Class Program	Nominated	
Primetime Emmy Awards	2021	The Pepsi Super Bowl LV Halftime Show Starring The Weeknd	Outstanding Variety Special (Live)	Nominated	
Primetime Emmy Awards	2022	The Pepsi Super Bowl LVI Halftime Show Starring Dr. Dre, Snoop Dogg, Mary J. Blige, Eminem, Kendrick Lamar and 50 Cent	Outstanding Variety Special (Live)	Won	
Primetime Emmy Awards	2023	The Apple Music Super Bowl LVII Starring Rihanna	Outstanding Variety Special (Live)	Nominated	
Primetime Emmy Awards	2023	The Apple Music Super Bowl LVII Starring Rihanna	Outstanding Directing for a Variety Special	Won	
Primetime Emmy Awards	2024	The Apple Music Super Bowl LVIII Starring Usher	Outstanding Variety Special (Live)	Nominated	
Primetime Emmy Awards	2025	The Apple Music Super Bowl LIX Starring Kendrick Lamar	Outstanding Variety Special (Live)	Nominated	
Primetime Emmy Awards	2026	The Apple Music Super Bowl LX Starring Bad Bunny	Outstanding Variety Special (Live)	Won	
Sports Emmy Awards	2011	"Run This Town (Live at Super Bowl XLIV)"	Outstanding Music Composition/Direction/Lyrics	Won	
Radio Music Award	1999	"Can I Get A..."	Best Car Jam	Won	
Radio Music Award	2000	Jay-Z	Artist of the Year: Hip Hop/Rhythmic	Won	
Recording Academy Honors	2005	Jay-Z	New York Chapter's The Recording Academy Honors	Won	
Rock & Roll Hall of Fame	2021	Jay-Z	Inductee	Won	
RTHK International Pop Poll Awards	2004	Crazy in Love	Top Ten International Gold Songs	Won	
RTHK International Pop Poll Awards	2007	Déjà Vu (Beyoncé song)	Top Ten International Gold Songs	Won	
Smash Hits Awards	2003	"Crazy in Love" (featuring Jay-Z)	Best Music Video	Won	
SoCal Journalism Awards	2017	Jay-Z and Harvey Weinstein for Time: The Kalief Browder Story	Truthteller Award	Won	
Songwriters Hall of Fame	2018	Jay-Z	Inductee	Won	
Soul Train Awards	2001	Jay-Z	Sammy Davis Jr. Award for Entertainer of the Year	Won	
Soul Train Awards	2002	"The Blueprint"	R&B/Soul or Rap Album of the Year	Won	
Soul Train Awards	2005	"99 Problems"	Best R&B/Soul or Rap Music Video	Won	
Soul Train Awards	2007	"Show Me What You Got"	Best R&B/Soul or Rap Music Video	Won	
Source Awards	2001	Jay-Z	Artist of the Year - Solo	Won	
Source Awards	2004	Jay-Z	Lyricist of the Year	Won	
Space Shower Music Video Award	2004	"Crazy in Love" (featuring Jay-Z)	Best International Video	Won	
Space Shower Music Video Award	2004	"Crazy in Love" (featuring Jay-Z)	Best International Female Video	Won	
Sucker Free Awards	2011	Jay-Z & Kanye West	The Artist That Ran 2011	Nominated	
Sucker Free Awards	2011	Watch The Throne	Best Album of the Year	Won	
Sucker Free Awards	2011	"Niggas In Paris" (with Kanye West)	Song of the Year	Won	
Swiss Music Awards	2008	"Umbrella" (with Rihanna)	Best Song - International	Won	
Swiss Music Awards	2012	"Watch the Throne" (with Kanye West)	Best Album Urban - International	Nominated	
Swiss Music Awards	2014	"Magna Carta…Holy Grail"	Best Album Urban - International	Nominated	
SXSW Awards	2014	"Smile"	Best Music Video Jury Award	Won	
Teen Choice Awards	2003	"Crazy in Love"	Choice Music: Love Song	Won	
Teen Choice Awards	2003	"Crazy in Love"	Choice Music: Summer Song	Won	
Teen Choice Awards	2013	"Suit & Tie"	Choice Single: Male Artist	Nominated	
Teen Choice Awards	2013	"Suit & Tie"	Choice Summer Music Star: Male	Nominated	
Teen Choice Awards	2013	"Legends of the Summer Tour"	Choice Summer Tour	Nominated	
Teen Choice Awards	2007	"Umbrella"	Choice Music: Single	Nominated	
Television Academy Honors	2019	Rest in Power: The Trayvon Martin Story	Honoree	Won	
The Gathering for Harry	2021	Jay-Z	Gatekeeper of Truth Award	Won	
Ticketmaster Touring Milestone Award	2019	On the Run II Tour	Touring Milestone Award	Won	
Tony Awards	2010	Fela!	Best Musical	Nominated	
UK Festival Awards	2008	Jay-Z mocks Noel Gallagher with his rendition of Wonderwall at Glastonbury	Most Memorable Moment	Won	
UK Music Video Awards	2010	"On To The Next One" with Swizz Beatz	Best Telecine in a Video	Nominated	
UK Music Video Awards	2010	"On To The Next One" with Swizz Beatz	Best Editing in a Video	Won	
UK Music Video Awards	2010	"On To The Next One" with Swizz Beatz	Best Urban Video - International	Nominated	
UK Music Video Awards	2011	"Otis" with Kanye West	Best Urban Video - International	Won	
UK Music Video Awards	2012	"Ni**as In Paris" ft. Kanye West	Best Urban Video - International	Nominated	
UK Music Video Awards	2012	"No Church In The Wild" with Kanye West	Best Urban Video - International	Nominated	
UK Music Video Awards	2012	"No Church In The Wild" with Kanye West	Best Telecine in a Video	Nominated	
UK Music Video Awards	2015	"On the Run Tour" with Beyoncé	Best Live Music Coverage	Nominated	
UK Music Video Awards	2017	"Moonlight"	Best Urban Video - International	Nominated	
UK Music Video Awards	2017	"The Story of O.J."	Vevo MUST SEE Award	Nominated	
UK Music Video Awards	2017	"The Story of O.J."	Best Animation in a Video	Nominated	
UK Music Video Awards	2017	"Bam" ft. Damian Marley	Best Colour Grading in a Video	Nominated	
UK Music Video Awards	2021	"Entrepreneur" ft. Pharrell Williams	Best Hip Hop/Grime/Rap Video - International	Nominated	
United Nations Global Leadership Award	2006	Jay-Z	United Nations Humanitarian Award	Won	
Urban Music Award	2009	Jay-Z	Best Hip-Hop Act	Won	
VH1 BIG Awards	2006	The Carters	BIG Couple	Won	
VH1 Soul VIBE Awards	2003	"Crazy in Love"	Coolest Collaboration	Won	
VH1 Soul VIBE Awards	2003	Jay-Z	TuBig Award	Won	
VH1 Soul VIBE Awards	2004	"99 Problems"	Reelest Video	Won	
VH1 Soul VIBE Awards	2007		Video of the Year	Won	
VH1 Soul VIBE Awards	2007	Jay-Z	Vibe Props	Won	
Webby Awards	2007	JAY-Z: Water For Life	Web - Activism	Won	
Webby Awards	2011	JAY-Z Hits Collection Vol. 1	General Website - Music	Won	
Webby Awards	2014	JAY-Z MAGNA CARTA HOLY GRAIL APP	Mobile & Apps - Music	Won	
Webby Awards	2014	JAY-Z Gold Window	Advertising & Media - Augmented Reality	Won	
Webby Awards	2018	Jay-Z: Smile	Film & Video - Best Individual Performance	Won	
Webby Awards	2018	Jay-Z: Smile	Music Video	Won	
Whudat Music Award	2001	"Jay-Z"	Hip-Hop Artist of the Year	Won	
Whudat Music Award	2001	"Do It Again - 6 AM"	Hip-Hop Single of the Year	Won	
Whudat Music Award	2001	"Roc-A-Fella"	Clique of the Year	Won	
Whudat Music Award	2002	"Jay-Z"	Hip-Hop Artist of the Year	Won	
Whudat Music Award	2002	The Blueprint	Hip-Hop Album of the Year	Won	
Whudat Music Award	2002	"Roc-A-Fella"	Clique of the Year	Won	
Whudat Music Award	2002	"Jay-Z"	The Comeback Home Notice	Won	
Whudat Music Award	2004	Panjabi MC feat. Jay-Z "Beware of the Boyz"	The Undocumented Remix of the Year	Won	
Whudat Music Award	2005	"99 Problems"	Video of the Year	Won	
Wild Writings Online Awards	2003	"Crazy in Love" (featuring Jay-Z)	Best Song of the Year	Won	
Wild Writings Online Awards	2003	"Crazy in Love" (featuring Jay-Z)	Best Video of the Year	Won	
World Music Award	2010	Jay-Z	Best Pop Act	Nominated	
XXL Awards	2001	Jay-Z	Man of the Year	Won	
XXL Awards	2022	Jay-Z	Humanitarian Award	Won	
XXL Awards	2024	Jay-Z	Humanitarian Award	Won	

== Other honors ==
In 2006, Jay-Z journeyed to Nigeria as part of his activities in the service of the U.N. Water for Life project. While there, he was enstooled as the Sarkin Waka of Kwara – a chieftain of the Fula people – by Alhaji Ibrahim Kolapo Sulu Gambari, the Emir of the Ilorin Emirate.
