= Dope Boy Fresh =

Dope Boy Fresh may refer to:

- "Doe Boy Fresh", a 2007 song by Three Six Mafia
- "Jockin' Jay-Z (Dopeboy Fresh)", a 2008 song by Jay-Z
