= A Star Is Born (Jay-Z song) =

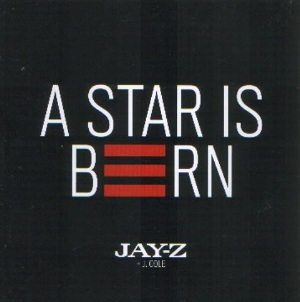

Single by Jay-Z featuring J. Cole

from the album The Blueprint 3
- Released: June 25, 2010
- Recorded: 2008–2009
- Studio: Avex, Honolulu, Hawaii; Roc the Mic, New York City; Westlake Recording, Los Angeles
- Genre: Hip-hop
- Length: 3:48
- Label: Roc Nation; Atlantic
- Songwriters: Shawn Carter; Ernest Wilson; Jermaine Cole; Kanye West; Maurice Jordan
- Producers: West; Ke'noe; No I.D. (co.)

Jay-Z singles chronology
"XXXO" (2010)	"A Star Is Born" (2010)	"Hot Tottie" (2010)

J. Cole singles chronology
"Who Dat" (2010)	"A Star Is Born" (2010)	"Feel Love" (2011)

"A Star Is Born" is a song by American hip-hop recording artist Jay-Z from his eleventh studio album The Blueprint 3 (2009). The song, produced by Kanye West, Kenoe and No I.D., features a verse from American rapper J. Cole, Jay-Z's protege and the first artist to be signed to his Roc Nation label. In the song, Jay-Z recognizes rappers who have risen to fame in the last decade, such as Wu-Tang Clan, Kanye West, Lil Wayne, T.I., Eminem and 50 Cent. Notably, Jay-Z also gives shout-outs to Mobb Deep, and Nas, two of the artists whom he had previously insulted on his 2001 song "Takeover".

== Background and recording ==
After graduating from college, J. Cole sought to attract the attention of Jay-Z in the hopes of working with him. Following several efforts, including increased social networking activity and seeking internships at recording studios, J. Cole was finally contacted by Jay-Z and invited to contribute to his eleventh studio album The Blueprint 3 (2009). Cole also subsequently signed a recording contract with Jay-Z's record label Roc Nation.

We get to New York, me and my nigga, Ib. We walk in the studio. I'm already nervous, [...] I see this nigga Jay-Z and who the fuck was right next to him? Beyoncé. Oh my God. My motherfucking heart damn near fell out my chest.

— J. Cole, recalling his experiences recording with Jay-Z

The duo's The Blueprint 3 collaboration came in the form of "A Star Is Born", which features verses from the two rappers. The song was produced by Kanye West, Kenoe, and No I.D. and incorporates samples of the 1977 song "Touch Me" by R&B group Mother Freedom Band. It was originally slated to have two verses performed by Jay-Z and one by J. Cole, but the former added a third verse during a recording session. Cole wrote his verse for "A Star Is Born" in about 45 minutes in the studio. Its chorus is performed by R&B singer Tony Williams; an early version of the song featured vocals from both Williams and hip-hop recording artist Kid Cudi, but only the former's contributions were ultimately used in the final mix. Williams himself was not aware of the prominence of his vocals on "A Star Is Born" until his friend Omar Edwards approached him and complimented his performance on the song.

== Critical reception ==
"A Star Is Born" received mixed reviews from music critics. Charles Aaron of Spin praised its "anthemic, edgy soul-clap" beat and the two rappers' individual performances, lauding Jay-Z in particular as "effortlessly dazzling". Pitchfork's Ian Cohen, however, dismissed the song as a "numbingly non-committal salutation" Alexis Petridis, writing for The Guardian, negatively described "A Star Is Born" as a "mass of indistinct tracks".

== Release and live performances ==
"A Star Is Born" impacted urban contemporary radio in the United Kingdom on June 25, 2010, and it was added to the playlist of urban radio station BBC Radio 1Xtra the same date. On July 21, the song was added to the BBC Radio 1 playlist. While not officially released as a single in the United States, "A Star Is Born" peaked at number 91 on the Billboard Hot R&B/Hip-Hop Songs chart following the release of The Blueprint 3. J. Cole performed his verse on "A Star Is Born" at the 2010 BET Awards, where he also added an additional verse. Cole also performed the song at New York-based radio station Hot 97's 2010 Summer Jam concert.

== Charts ==
Chart (2009)	Peak position
US Hot R&B/Hip-Hop Songs (Billboard)	91
