= Eric Wong =

American music executive

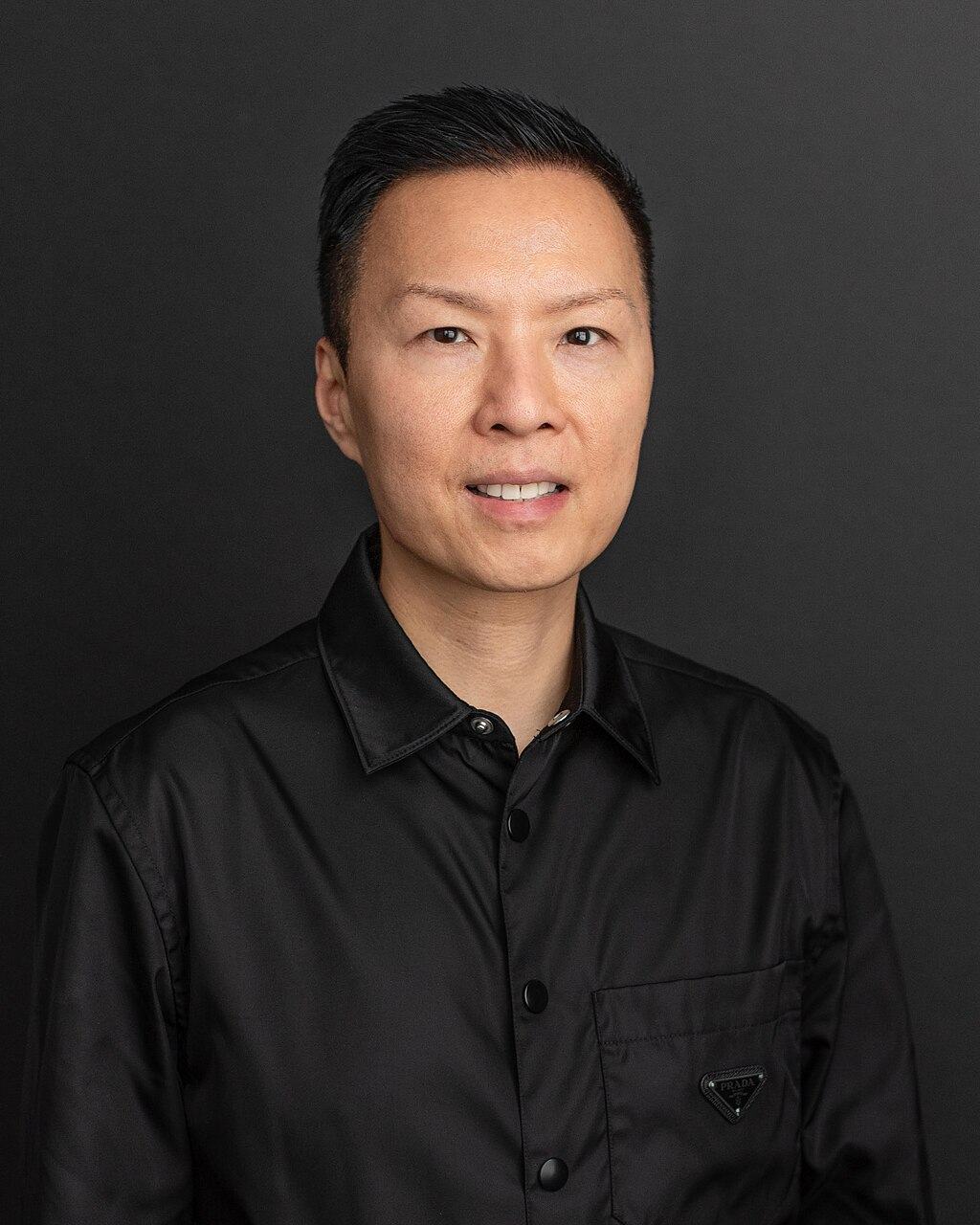
- Born: New York City
- Occupations: EVP, Recorded Music, Warner Music Group President, East West Records U.S. President, Warner Music Canada
- Honours: Billboard Power 100 (2019, 2020, 2021, 2022); Billboard Global Power Player 100 (2021, 2022, 2023, 2024, 2025, 2026)

Eric Wong, born in New York City, is the EVP of Recorded Music for Warner Music Group, President of East West Records U.S. and President of Warner Music Canada.

== Career ==
=== Early career ===
Wong grew up obsessed with music and at age 16, went from devotedly studying the Billboard Charts each week to an internship while still in high school. While attending New York University, Wong became a college rep for EMI Records. While still at NYU, he was hired at V2 Records where he led campaigns for artists such as Moby, Underworld, and Stereophonics.

At the Island Def Jam Music Group, Wong developed campaigns for a diverse group of acts which included Bon Jovi, Fall Out Boy, Rihanna, Slayer, Sum 41, and Christina Milian.

Wong worked at Bad Boy Entertainment and Atlantic Records, serving simultaneously as Chief Marketing Officer of Bad Boy and Senior Vice President of Marketing at Atlantic. In this dual role, he was able to get more deeply involved in hip-hop, while keeping a hand in the rock and pop he also loved. Wong points to the opportunity to work on Jay-Z’s landmark album The Blueprint 3 as a defining moment in his career. Seeking additional challenges, he founded Wong Management, where he worked closely with Mariah Carey.

=== 2011-2020 ===
Wong was Executive Vice President of Marketing at Island Def Jam Music Group, executing marketing strategies for artists including Kanye West, Rihanna, Avicii, The-Dream, Fall Out Boy, The Killers, Toni Braxton, and Babyface. His responsibilities expanded to oversee the label group's marketing, digital, creative, artist development, video promotion, and video production departments. He then assumed the role of Executive Vice President / General Manager of Island Records. He was later named the Chief Operating Officer (COO) of the label, overseeing label operations and strategy for their entire roster which included artists such as Shawn Mendes, Demi Lovato, Nick Jonas, Fall Out Boy, Tove Lo, The Killers, Bishop Briggs, Jessie Reyez, Elton John, and Mike Posner.

=== 2020-Present ===
Wong served as President & Chief Marketing Officer (CMO) of Recorded Music for Warner Music Group.

He then took on the role President of East West Records and Head of Global A&R, Warner Recorded Music. As Warner Music Group strengthened its alignment across territories, Warner Music Canada is connected more directly to the U.S. team with Wong overseeing the business.

Wong was then promoted to EVP, Recorded Music at Warner Music Group alongside his post as President of East West Records US, and President of Warner Music Canada. In this elevated role, Wong spearheads flagship global marketing campaigns and leads global A&R, working closely with WMG’s labels, artists, and their teams to turbocharge high-impact storytelling around the world.

Warner Music Group is the home to artists including Ed Sheeran, Cardi B, Charli XCX, Coldplay, Dua Lipa, Bruno Mars, Teddy Swims, Benson Boone, Sombr, Rosé, Alex Warren, and more.

== Recognitions ==
- Billboard Global Power Player List (2021, 2022, 2023, 2024, 2025, 2026)
- Billboard Canadian Power Player List (2026)
- Billboard Executive of the Week (2022)
- Billboard Power 100 list (2019, 2020, 2021, 2022)
- Gold House's A100 List of Most Impactful Asians (2020, 2021, 2022)
- Variety New Power of New York List (2018)
- Billboard Forty Under Forty Power Players List (2012, 2015)
