= Swagga Like Us =

2008 single by Jay-Z and T.I. featuring Kanye West and Lil Wayne

Single by Jay-Z and T.I. featuring Kanye West and Lil Wayne

from the album Paper Trail
- Released: September 6, 2008
- Recorded: 2008
- Studio: Record Plant (Hollywood, California)
- Genre: Hip hop
- Length: 5:27 (album version); 4:14 (single version)
- Label: Roc-A-Fella; Def Jam
- Songwriters: Clifford Harris; Kanye West; Shawn Carter; Dwayne Carter Jr.; Mathangi Arulpragasam; Topper Headon; Mick Jones; Joe Strummer; Wesley Pentz; Paul Simonon
- Producers: Kanye West; Mike Caren

T.I. singles chronology
"Wish You Would" (2008)	"Swagga Like Us" (2008)	"Hi Hater (Remix)" (2008)

Kanye West singles chronology
"Put On" (2008)	"Swagga like Us" (2008)	"Stay Up! (Viagra)" (2008)

Jay-Z singles chronology
"Mr. Carter" (2008)	"Swagga like Us" (2008)	"Jockin' Jay-Z (Dopeboy Fresh)" (2008)

Lil Wayne singles chronology
"Official Girl" (2008)	"Swagga like Us" (2008)	"Mrs. Officer" (2008)

Audio
- "Swagga Like Us" on YouTube

"Swagga Like Us" is a song by American rappers Jay-Z, T.I., Kanye West, and Lil Wayne, released on September 6, 2008, in the United States as the fifth single from T.I.'s sixth album Paper Trail (2008). The track was also initially slated for inclusion on Jay-Z's eleventh album The Blueprint 3 (2009), however it ultimately failed to make the final track listing. The song was produced by West, constructed primarily around a vocal sample of "Paper Planes" by British musician M.I.A.

"Swagga like Us" received mostly mixed reviews from music critics: whilst many complimented T.I.'s performance and the production, most denounced the other three rappers' performances as lyrically uninspired and overly brash, with Wayne and West also singled out for criticism for the perceived overuse of Auto-Tune in their vocals. Commercially, however, the song was a success despite a premature leak to the internet: it debuted and peaked at number five on the US Billboard Hot 100, and also charted modestly in a few overseas territories. It was nominated for Best Rap Song and Best Rap Performance by a Duo or Group at the 51st Grammy Awards, winning the latter: the four rappers, alongside M.I.A. herself, also performed "Swagga Like Us" and the original "Paper Planes" during the ceremony.

== Background ==
Kanye West had originally wanted to work with British artist M.I.A. on his second studio album Late Registration (2005), but her busy schedule prevented this from happening. However, his interest in her music grew further after he heard her 2007 song "Paper Planes", which he decided to use in a hip hop music production—the first he had composed since the death of his mother, Donda West, in 2007 following complications during cosmetic surgery.

"Swagga Like Us" was heavily remixed by various artists. Hip hop duo Clipse included their remix on their mixtape Road to Till the Casket Drops. Diddy recorded a remix titled "Swagger Like Puff" featuring Cassie singing the chorus, which managed to peak at number seventeen on the Deutsche Black Charts. Trey Songz has also recorded a remix under the title "Swagga Like Songz". On November 10, 2008, Chamillionaire released his own remix of the song for his mixtape Mixtape Messiah 5, titled "Swagga Like Koop".

Apathy released a freestyle over this song called "Swagga Like Ap" on the third volume of the It's the Bootleg, Muthafuckas! series. Also, Drake, Fabolous, Freeway, Twista, Kid Cudi, Tinie Tempah, Flo Rida, Hot Rod and Tony Yayo have all performed or recorded freestyles over the instrumental. Rick Ross has also done his own freestyle remix, stated to be in retaliation for being left off the original song. Dolla created his own version featured on his last mixtape, The Miseducation of Dolla.

Jim Jones recorded "Jackin' Swagger from Us" with Twista, NOE and Lil Wayne which takes shots at T.I. and Jay-Z for allegedly stealing their styles. The song is a bonus track on his album Pray IV Reign.

== Recording ==
Having completed it with the assistance of fellow producer Mike Caren, West specifically chose to send the production to fellow rapper T.I., who was recording material for his sixth studio album Paper Trail (2008). West offered him no other tracks to choose to record over. T.I. accepted the production and originally planned "Swagga like Us" to be a collaboration only with West, writing two verses with West providing a verse of his own. He decided, however, to make it an "event" record and send it to fellow rappers Jay-Z and Lil Wayne to record verses over, admitting to MTV News that it was a "very ambitious idea but a lovely one". Once they both accepted and duly sent their (demo) vocals back to T.I., he wrote two additional verses, but only chose the last of the four he had written to actually perform on "Swagga like Us", as he felt it "stood out (better) than the others".

All of the vocals on the final mix, with the exception of M.I.A.'s, were recorded at the Record Plant recording studio in Hollywood, California. The song was mixed by Andrew Dawson at Pacifique Recording Studios in Los Angeles, California, whilst the mastering was carried out by Chris Gehringer. West emailed one of the song's early demos to M.I.A. herself, which she proclaimed "really hot", but that the final version "sounded even better". "Swagga like Us" was finally completed in July 2008: Jay-Z's satisfaction with the finished version of the song was such that T.I. claimed he wished to include it on his eleventh studio album The Blueprint 3 (2009), although this did not transpire.

== Composition ==
A hip hop song, "Swagga Like Us" is built around a sample of "Paper Planes" by British artist M.I.A., featuring the line, "no one on the corner had swagger like us". Since "Paper Planes" itself samples the 1982 song "Straight to Hell" by British rock group The Clash, each of the writers of both songs are credited as writing "Swagga like Us". West added a "sumo–heavy bass" and drum line similar to that of a marching band to the vocal sample: the sounds combine to form a "noisy, warbling and exaggerated electronic melody". Shannon Barbour of About.com considered it to incorporate the "leftover retro 80's electro-funk" found on West's previous studio album Graduation (2007).

== Critical reception ==
Brian Hiatt, writing for Rolling Stone, noted that "with a beat this hooky, everybody wins" although he criticized the individual performances of Lil Wayne as "lazy" and Jay-Z for "sticking in an over-obvious nod to his single 'Jockin' Jay-Z'", and also felt the use of the "Paper Planes" sample risked undermining M.I.A.'s artistry: "It's hard not to be slightly bummed by the prospect of one of the decade's most innovative artists being reduced to a hook girl." Ian Cohen of Pitchfork felt that, "For better or worse, "Swagga Like Us" defines Paper Trail", arguing that T.I.'s then upcoming prison sentence "trigger[ed] an impulse to challenge himself" to improve the quality of his performances across the album. However, he too denounced the rappers as generally overconfident, concluding that "one-upmanship [gave] way to self-assured competence and Khaled-inspired complacence", although he complimented T.I. for "effortlessly best[ing] them all". The Guardian's Angus Batey considered the idea of the four artists recording together to be better than the song itself, calling it "good-on-paper, less-so-in-the-booth".

=== Accolades ===
The song was nominated for a Grammy for Best Rap Song and won the Best Rap Performance by a Duo or Group at the 51st Grammy Awards. T.I., Kanye West, Jay-Z, Lil Wayne, and M.I.A. (who was nine months pregnant at the time and supposedly due on the day of the performance) performed the song at Grammy Awards that year. This song was number 22 on Rolling Stone's list of the 100 Best Songs of 2008.

== Charts ==
=== Weekly charts ===
Chart (2008)	Peak position
Canada Hot 100 (Billboard)	19
Sweden (Sverigetopplistan)	22
UK Singles (OCC)	33
US Billboard Hot 100	5
US Hot R&B/Hip-Hop Songs (Billboard)	11
US Pop 100 (Billboard)	19
US Hot Rap Songs (Billboard)	4

=== Year-end charts ===
Chart (2008)	Position
US Hot R&B/Hip-Hop Songs (Billboard)	80
Chart (2009)	Position
US Hot R&B/Hip-Hop Songs (Billboard)	94

== Certifications ==
Region	Certification	Certified units/sales
United States (RIAA)	Platinum	1,000,000^{‡}
^{‡} Sales+streaming figures based on certification alone.

== Release history ==
Country	Date	Format	Label
United Kingdom	September 4, 2008	Digital download	Mercury Records
United States	September 6, 2008	Digital download	Mercury, Roc-A-Fella, Def Jam Recordings
United States	November 18, 2008	Vinyl single	Roc-A-Fella, Def Jam
