= List of Billboard 200 number-one albums of 2009 =

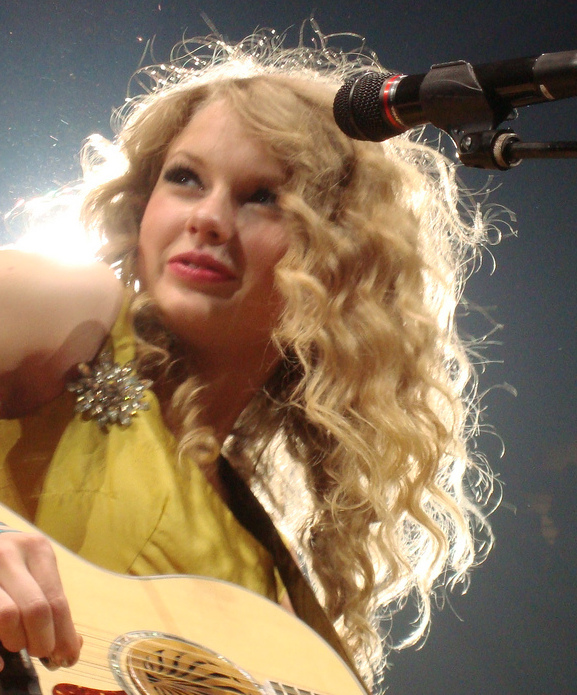
Country singer Taylor Swift's second studio album, Fearless, was the best selling album of 2009.

These are the US number one albums of 2009, per the Billboard 200. Note that Billboard publishes charts with an issue date approximately 7–10 days in advance. Fearless, the second studio album by American country singer-songwriter Taylor Swift, was the best selling album of 2009, and ended atop the Billboard 200 year-end chart of the year.

== Chart history ==
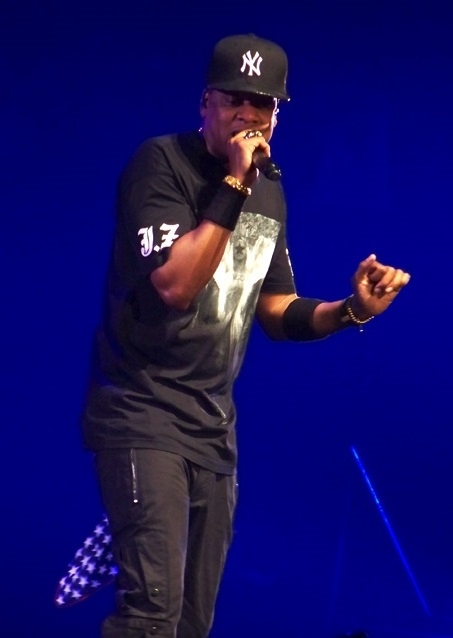
Rapper Jay-Z gained his tenth number one album with The Blueprint 3.

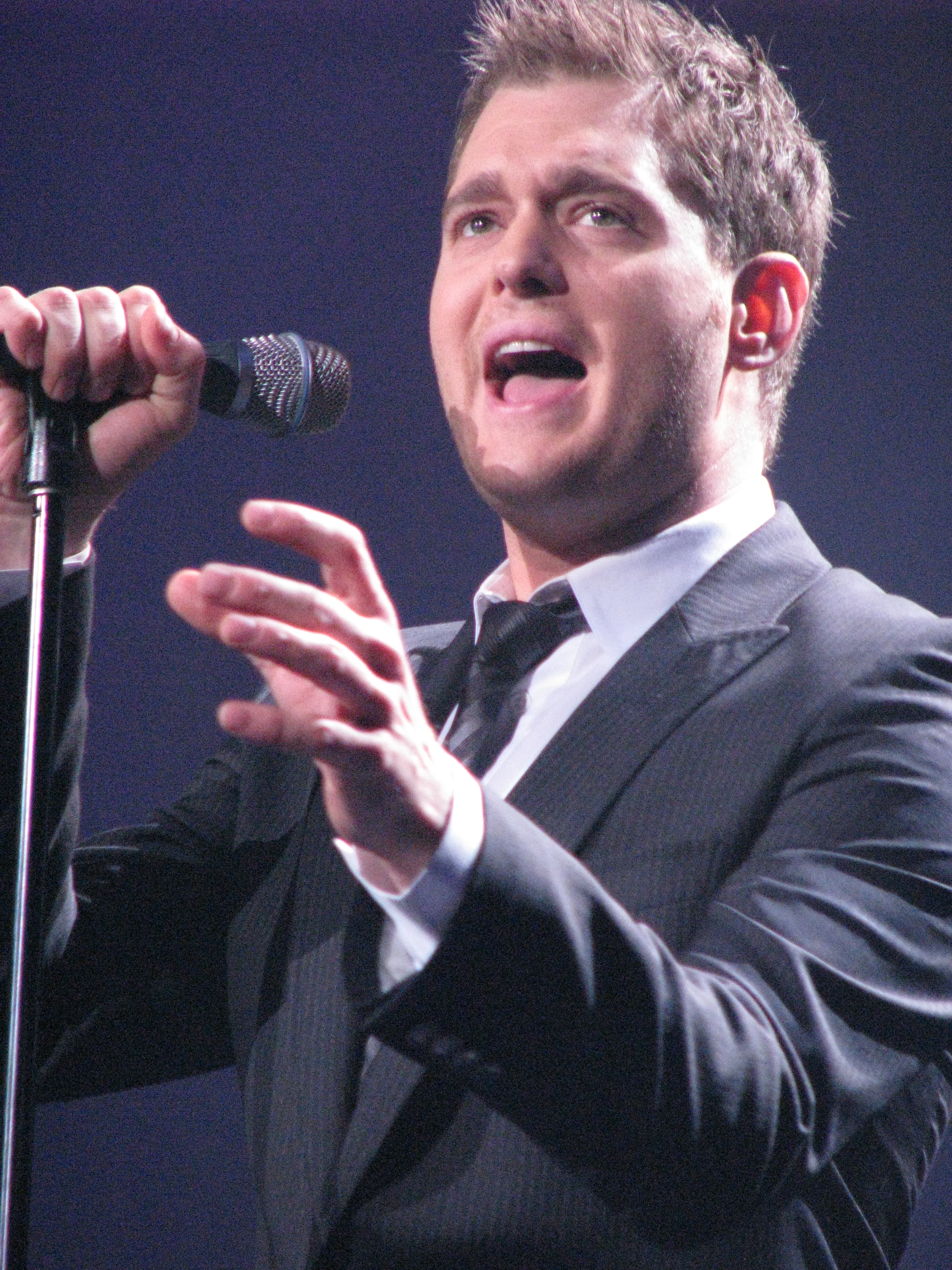
Canadian singer Michael Bublé hit number one with his fourth studio album, Crazy Love.

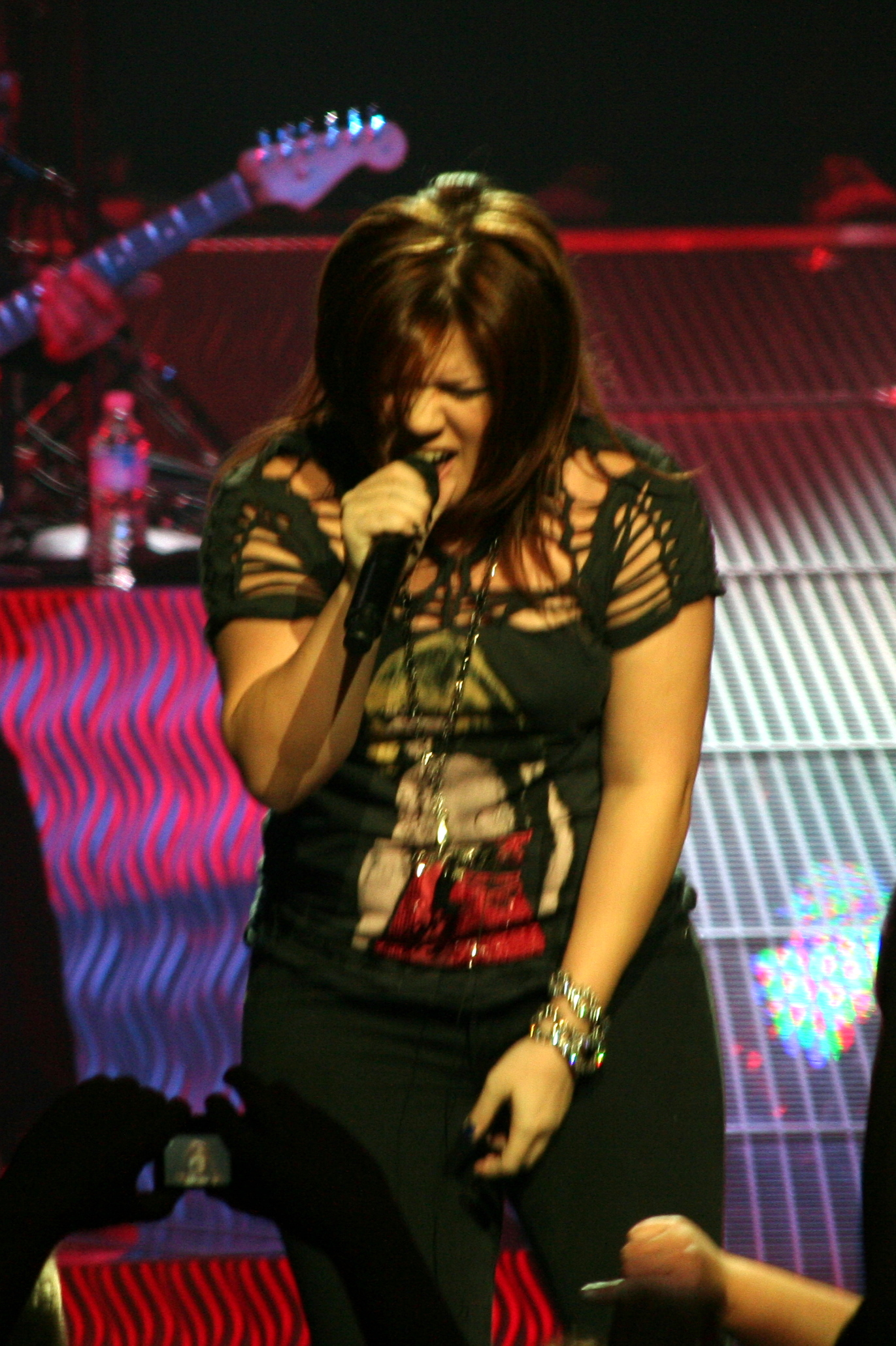
Pop rock singer Kelly Clarkson gained her second number one album with All I Ever Wanted.

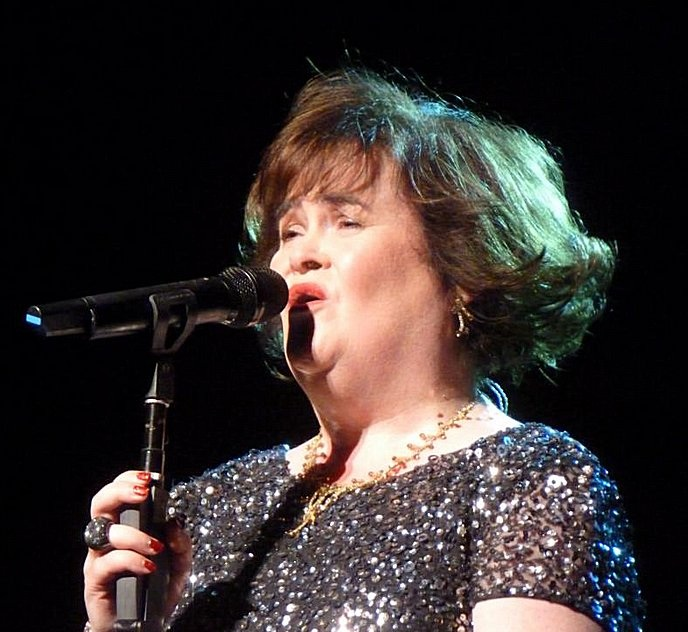
Scottish singer Susan Boyle's debut album, I Dreamed a Dream, was the Christmas number-one album.

Key
†	Indicates best performing album of 2009

Issue date	Album	Artist(s)	Sales	Ref.
January 3	Fearless †	Taylor Swift	330,000	
January 10	Fearless †	Taylor Swift	262,000	
January 17	Fearless †	Taylor Swift	90,000	
January 24	Fearless †	Taylor Swift	72,000	
January 31	Fearless †	Taylor Swift	63,000	
February 7	Fearless †	Taylor Swift	63,000	
February 14	Working on a Dream	Bruce Springsteen	224,000	
February 21	The Fray	The Fray	179,000	
February 28	Fearless †	Taylor Swift	92,000	
March 7	Fearless †	Taylor Swift	62,000	
March 14	Fearless †	Taylor Swift	73,000	
March 21	No Line on the Horizon	U2	484,000	
March 28	All I Ever Wanted	Kelly Clarkson	255,000	
April 4	All I Ever Wanted	Kelly Clarkson	90,000	
April 11	Now 30	Various Artists	146,000	
April 18	Defying Gravity	Keith Urban	171,000	
April 25	Unstoppable	Rascal Flatts	351,000	
May 2	Hannah Montana: The Movie	Soundtrack	133,000	
May 9	Deeper Than Rap	Rick Ross	158,000	
May 16	Together Through Life	Bob Dylan	125,000	
May 23	Epiphany	Chrisette Michele	83,000	
May 30	21st Century Breakdown	Green Day	215,000	
June 6	Relapse	Eminem	608,000	
June 13	Relapse	Eminem	211,000	
June 20	Big Whiskey and the GrooGrux King	Dave Matthews Band	424,000	
June 27	The E.N.D.	The Black Eyed Peas	304,000	
July 4	Lines, Vines and Trying Times	Jonas Brothers	247,000	
July 11	The E.N.D.	The Black Eyed Peas	88,000	
July 18	Now 31	Various Artists	169,000	
July 25	BLACKsummers'night	Maxwell	316,000	
August 1	Leave This Town	Daughtry	269,000	
August 8	Here We Go Again	Demi Lovato	108,000	
August 15	Loso's Way	Fabolous	99,000	
August 22	Live on the Inside	Sugarland	76,000	
August 29	Twang	George Strait	155,000	
September 5	Keep on Loving You	Reba McEntire	96,000	
September 12	Breakthrough	Colbie Caillat	106,000	
September 19	I Look to You	Whitney Houston	305,000	
September 26	The Blueprint 3	Jay-Z	476,000	
October 3	The Blueprint 3	Jay-Z	298,000	
October 10	Backspacer	Pearl Jam	189,000	
October 17	Love Is the Answer	Barbra Streisand	180,000	
October 24	Crazy Love	Michael Bublé	132,000	
October 31	Crazy Love	Michael Bublé	213,000	
November 7	New Moon	Soundtrack	153,000	
November 14	This Is It	Michael Jackson	373,000	
November 21	Play On	Carrie Underwood	318,000	
November 28	The Circle	Bon Jovi	163,000	
December 5	Battle Studies	John Mayer	286,000	
December 12	I Dreamed a Dream	Susan Boyle	701,000	
December 19	I Dreamed a Dream	Susan Boyle	527,000	
December 26	I Dreamed a Dream	Susan Boyle	582,000	
