= Jockin' Jay-Z (Dopeboy Fresh) =

"Jockin' Jay-Z (Dope Boy Fresh)"

Single by Jay-Z

from the album The Blueprint 3 (intended)
- Released: September 16, 2008
- Recorded: 2008
- Genre: Hip hop, rap rock
- Label: Roc-A-Fella; Def Jam
- Songwriters: Shawn Carter; Kanye West; Joseph Simmons
- Producer: Kanye West

Jay-Z singles chronology
"Swagga Like Us" (2008)	"Jockin' Jay-Z (Dope Boy Fresh)" (2008)	"Lost+ / Viva la Vida (Live At the 51st Annual Grammy Awards)" (2009)

"Jockin' Jay-Z" is a song by American rapper Jay-Z, produced by Kanye West. Originally intended for inclusion on his eleventh studio album The Blueprint 3, the song didn't make the final track listing and remained a digital-only single until it was included as a b-side on various releases of the "Empire State of Mind" single. It samples "Dumb Girl" by Run-D.M.C. and first leaked on the internet in July 2008 – but with low quality sound. The mastered version was released in August 2008.

== Background ==
Jay-Z debuted the song at a Kanye West show at Madison Square Garden in August 2008. West told the audience that he wanted to play a beat he'd been working on, and once it started, Jay-Z came out and rapped over it. Once the abridged version of song concluded, Jay-Z and West simultaneously struck b-boy stances. The track contains a vocal sample of "Dumb Girl" by Run-DMC. West came up with the idea of revamping Run's line, "I seen you jockin' J.C."

== Oasis lyric war ==
The song's earliest form as previewed at Kanye West's Madison Square Garden show in August 2008 included the line "That bloke from Oasis said I couldn't play guitar, somebody should have told him I'm a fucking rock star" followed by the opening line to the Oasis song "Wonderwall". This was a response to a comment made by Oasis guitarist and songwriter Noel Gallagher in April 2008 when he suggested that a hip-hop headline act was wrong for the Glastonbury Festival. This set off a media-fueled storm of controversy. At Glastonbury Jay-Z performed an ironic version of Oasis's "Wonderwall". Jay-Z's reactions were reportedly described by an Oasis band member as like that of an eight-year-old girl. When Oasis later split due to a personality clash between Noel and Liam Gallagher, Jay-Z scored a point back by suggesting he would like to work with Liam.

== Charts ==
Chart (2008)	Peak position
US Hot R&B/Hip-Hop Songs (Billboard)	51
US Hot Rap Songs (Billboard)	18
US Rhythmic Airplay (Billboard)	35

== Release history ==
Country	Date	Format	Label
United States	September 16, 2008	Rhythmic contemporary radio	Roc-A-Fella, The Island Def Jam Music Group
