= Run This Town =

2009 single by Jay-Z

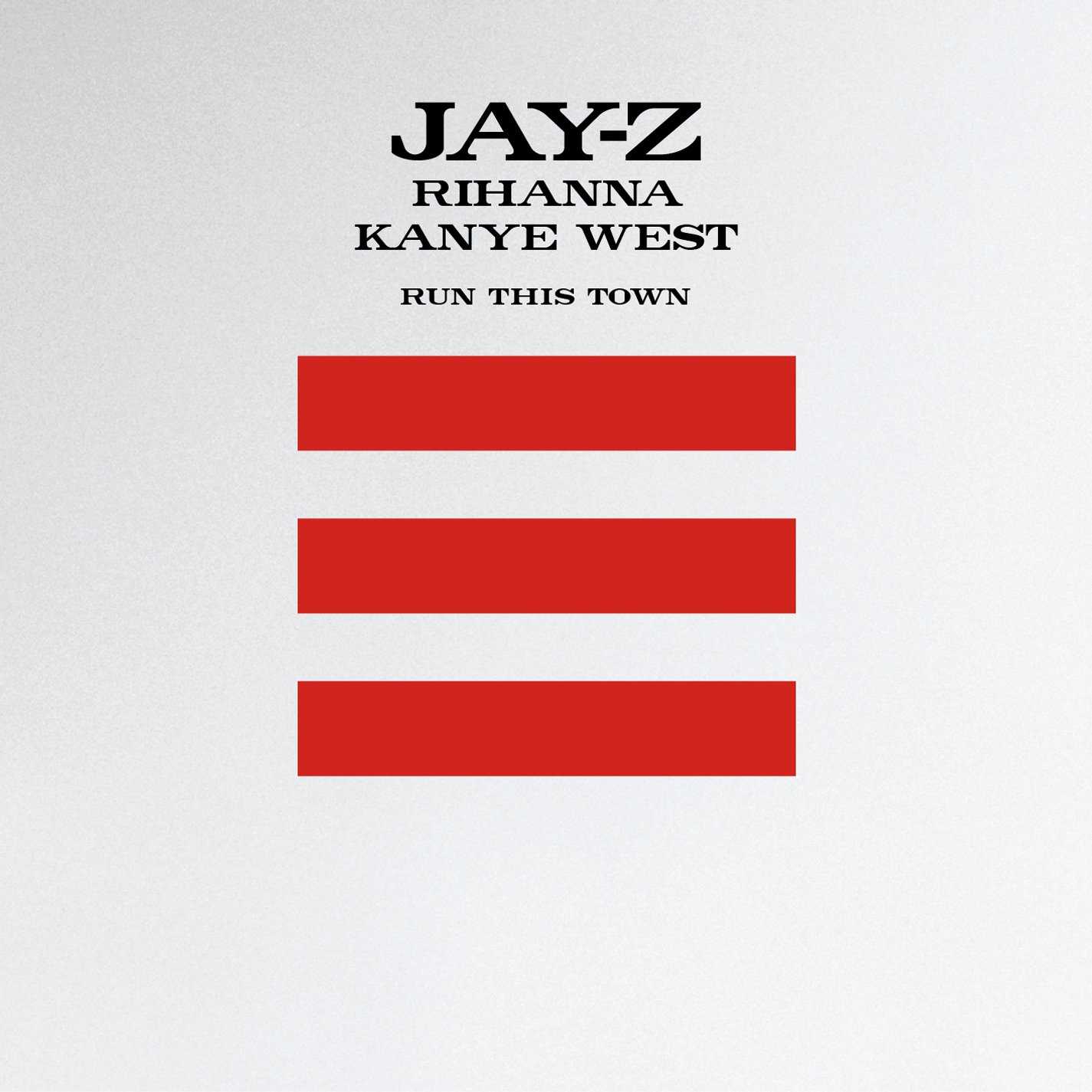

Single by Jay-Z featuring Rihanna and Kanye West

from the album The Blueprint 3
- Released: August 9, 2009
- Recorded: 2009
- Studio: Avex Honolulu Studios; (Honolulu, Hawaii); Roc The Mic Studios; (New York City, New York); Westlake Recording Studios; (Los Angeles, California)
- Genre: Alternative hip-hop; rap rock
- Length: 4:27 (album version); 4:34 (single version)
- Label: Roc Nation; Atlantic
- Songwriters: Shawn Carter; Kanye West; Robyn Fenty; Ernest Wilson; Jeff Bhasker; Athanasios Alatas
- Producers: West; No I.D.

Jay-Z singles chronology
"D.O.A. (Death of Auto-Tune)" (2009)	"Run This Town" (2009)	"Empire State of Mind" (2009)

Rihanna singles chronology
"Rehab" (2008)	"Run This Town" (2009)	"Russian Roulette" (2009)

Kanye West singles chronology
"Supernova" (2009)	"Run This Town" (2009)	"Forever" (2009)

Music video
- "Run This Town" on YouTube

"Run This Town" is a song by American rapper Jay-Z featuring Barbadian singer Rihanna and fellow American rapper Kanye West. Released on July 24, 2009, it was written by the artists alongside Athanasios Alatas, Jeff Bhasker, and No I.D., the latter producing it with West. "Run This Town" was released as the second single from Jay-Z's eleventh studio album, The Blueprint 3.

Reception to "Run This Town" was mixed; some music critics praised the song's production and the contributions of both Rihanna and West, while others noted that Jay-Z felt like a secondary presence on his own song, and criticized the lyrical choices as mismatched. The song was a commercial success, reaching number 2 on the Billboard Hot 100 and topping the charts in the United Kingdom. It additionally made top ten chartings in ten other countries including in Australia, Norway, Sweden, and Switzerland.

"Run This Town" won Best Rap Song and Best Rap/Sung Collaboration at the 52nd Annual Grammy Awards. The song's accompanying music video, directed by Anthony Mandler, depicts the trio in a post-apocalyptic environment, featuring scenes involving angry protesters surrounding them. "Run This Town" was performed by Jay-Z, West, and Rihanna on the series premiere of The Jay Leno Show in the United States.

== Background ==
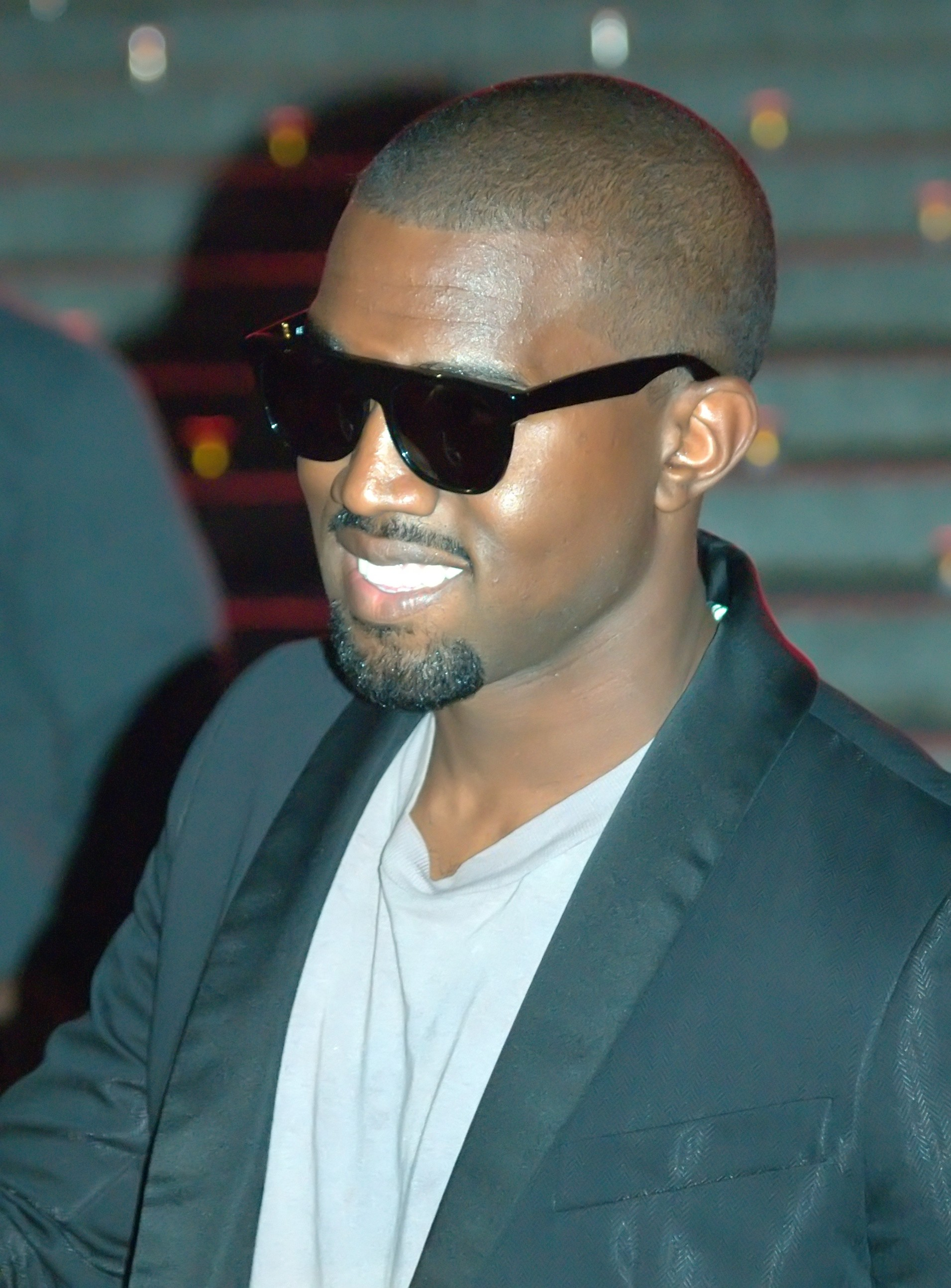
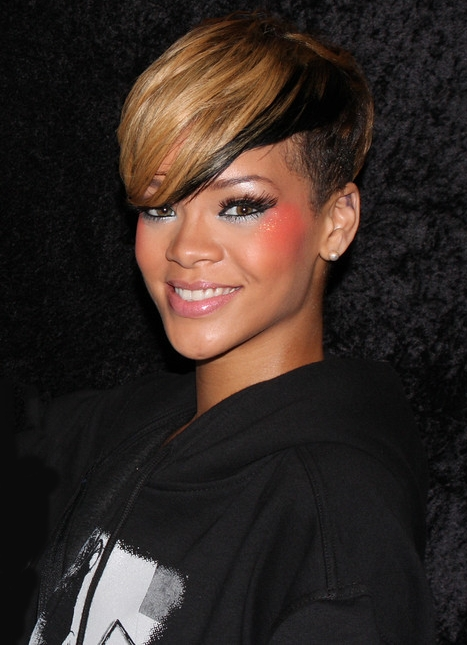
"Run This Town" features singer Rihanna (bottom) and rapper Kanye West (top), who also co-wrote the song.

"Run This Town" is the second official single from the album The Blueprint 3. "Off That" featuring Drake was originally planned to be the next single but "Run This Town" was decided upon instead. Jay-Z confirmed the release in an interview with Tim Westwood, saying, "We basically run this town. It's myself, Rihanna and Kanye. It's pretty much it." In an interview with Sound on Sound, Young Guru explained how Kanye West came to be featured on the song:

"The song was originally intended to feature just Jay and Rihanna, but he also wanted Kanye on it, because he felt that it would fit the texture of the song. So one day when Kanye was in New York, he came in at 10am and in two takes he was done.”

The song made its radio debut on July 24, 2009, at 9:11 am to coincide with the album's release date, September 11, 2009. "Run This Town" was officially released to urban radios in the United States on August 9, 2009 and was released via iTunes worldwide two days later on August 11. The CD single release followed on August 31, 2009, in the UK. Rihanna's contribution was her first musical appearance following her February 8 altercation with her ex-boyfriend Chris Brown earlier that year.

== Reception ==
=== Critical reception ===
"Run This Town" received mixed reviews from music critics. Following the leak of the song, Tom Breihan, Pitchfork gave a positive review. "The new Jay-Z/Rihanna/Kanye West track from 'The Blueprint 3', leaked this morning, and it bangs. Jay's 'D.O.A. (Death of Auto-Tune)' left the impression that The Blueprint 3 might be a cantankerous grumpy-old-man rap album, but 'Run This Town' totally obliterates that. Thanks to a molten motivational Rihanna chorus, it's pop-friendly as ----, without compromising Jay's fundamental hardness. And Jay is actually rapping like he cares, something he's only done intermittently over the last few years. Still, Kanye gets the hottest line on the song: 'What you think I rap for, to push a ------' RAV 4?'" Following the album's release, Pitchfork made another review of the song, again praising the track. "There's something for everybody: Jay [-Z] sounds engaged in a way he rarely has since unretiring, Rihanna coos those "ay ay"s the radio loves, and Kanye West, as you may have read, once again upstages the guy he's producing. Rihanna's hook may not be Auto-Tune'd, but it's definitely autopilot."

About.com felt that Jay-Z lacked presence, writing, "It looks like someone finally got tired of being bullied by 'Big Brother'. Roc Nation dropped the ball on the song credit though; it was supposed to read 'Kanye West Featuring Rihanna,' because 'Ye murdered Jay on his own track. But that's not saying much because Jay was running this race on one foot. In other words, Kanye didn't win, Jay lost". Digital Spy gave a mixed review of the song. "Boasting three of the biggest stars from the worlds of hip-hop and R&B, 'Run This Town' was never going to be a flop, but neither is it a roaring success. Kanye's slick rapping ("Reebok baby, you need to try some new things, have you ever had shoes without shoestrings?") and Rihanna's "hey-hey" chorus hook make Jay-Z seem surplus to requirements, which surely can't have been the aim. The chaotic military march beats are impressive – and hats off to Jigga for snubbing Auto-Tune – but this track still doesn't seem fitting of an artist considered a groundbreaking rap legend.

=== Accolades ===
Most notably, "Run This Town" was nominated for Best Rap Song and Best Rap/Sung Collaboration at the 52nd Grammy Awards in 2010. It eventually won both awards, marking Jay-Z's tenth and Rihanna's third and Kanye West's fourteenth win at the ceremony awards in total. The song also managed to win an Emmy Award for Outstanding Music Composition/Direction/Lyrics, during Super Bowl XLIV.

Nominations and awards
Year	Ceremony	Award	Result
2010	52nd Grammy Awards	Best Rap/Sung Collaboration	Won
2010	52nd Grammy Awards	Best Rap Song	Won
2010	BET Hip Hop Awards	Best Hip-Hop Video	Nominated
2010	International Dance Music Awards	Best Hip-Hop Dance Track	Nominated
2010	People's Choice Awards	Favourite Music Collaboration	Won
2011	Black Reel Awards	Best Original or Adapted Song	Nominated

== Chart performance ==
"Run This Town" entered the Billboard Hot 100 at number 88. Following its digital release and debut at number three on the Digital Songs chart, it soared from number 66 to three in its third week on the Hot 100 for the week ending August 16, 2009. The song eventually peaked at number two, marking Jay-Z's second-highest-charting song of his career as a lead artist. "Run This Town" reached number one on the Rap Songs chart on the date issued September 26, 2009, climbing from number four the previous week. It remained atop the chart for seven consecutive weeks. It also made an appearance on the R&B/Hip-Hop Songs chart at number three. Despite its genre of hip hop and R&B, the song managed to debut at number 38 on the Pop Songs chart on the issue dated September 12, 2009. It eventually reached the top ten at number eight. "Run This Town" additionally peaked at numbers two and three on the Radio Songs and Digital Songs charts. The song sold 2 million in paid downloads by early January 2010. "Run This Town" reached 3 million in digital sales in May 2012, becoming the third 3-million seller for Jay-Z, the sixth for West and a record ninth for Rihanna.

In Australia, "Run This Town" entered the Australian Singles Chart at number 35 on September 6, 2009. The following week it fell to number 39 but rebounded to a new peak of 25 in its third week. It reached the top ten of the chart on October 11, 2009, and made its peak of number nine in its seventh week. It has been certified Platinum by the Australian Recording Industry Association, denoting shipments of 70,000 copies.

In New Zealand, "Run This Town" debuted at number fourteen on the New Zealand Singles Chart on September 14, 2009, climbing to number ten the following week. In its third week, it fell to number thirteen but regained its peak position for the three weeks after. In its seventh total week on the chart, it made a new peak of number nine. It has received a Gold certification from the Recording Industry Association of New Zealand, for sales of 7,500 copies.

In Canada, the song peaked at number six on the Canadian Hot 100.

In the United Kingdom, "Run This Town" entered at number one on the UK Singles Chart on September 6, 2009 ― for the week ending date September 12, 2009 ― with sales of 62,000 copies. The feat gave Jay-Z his first number one single in Britain as a lead artist and fourth overall, following his feature on Rihanna's "Umbrella" (2007) and his wife Beyoncé's "Déjà Vu" (2006) and "Crazy in Love" (2003). It marked the third number one singles in that country for both Rihanna and Kanye West. For Rihanna, "Run This Town" gave her number ones on the chart in three consecutive years, following "Take a Bow" (2008) and "Umbrella" and followed West's chart leaders "American Boy" featuring Estelle (2008) and "Stronger" (2007).

Throughout the rest of Europe, the song also performed well, reaching the top five in Ireland and Norway and the top ten in the Czech Republic, Sweden and Switzerland. It also reached the top twenty in Denmark and Germany, top thirty in Hungary and top forty in France.

== Music video ==
=== Background ===
The video for "Run This Town" was directed by Anthony Mandler and was filmed on August 6, 2009, at Fort Totten Park in New York City. Mandler explained the production behind the video saying:

"There's a tone and feeling to the song, there's a militia, a march and a kind of rambunctious energy to it that, for me, I immediately wanted to tap into. I showed [Jay] some references from the classic rebellious zones of the world. We live in very orderly society in America, but when you get into Brazil, you get into the Middle East, you get into Africa, you get into Eastern Europe, when you get into places like that, there's a different sort of 'we run this town' [going on]. There's less order and more chaos. So we looked at a lot of those references, new photos and historical photos, to capture that kind of falling-apart feeling." "We wanted you to feel uneasy throughout the piece," he said. "We wanted there to be a constant layer of tension through the piece. Even in the way I shot — where the camera comes by Jay, it doesn't stop on him, it goes to Rihanna — there's kind of this chaos of revealing and covering and concealing. And things happen offscreen that you don't see. I think people are really gonna flip on this".

The video was leaked on August 19, 2009, by MTV Germany. It premiered officially on August 20 on MTV, as well other MTV channels across the world. The video was released to iTunes on August 25, 2009.

=== Synopsis and reception ===
The music video involves crowds of protesters in masks, holding torches whilst walking. Rihanna takes a bandanna from covering her mouth and performs the intro of the song in a park area with explosions firing around her. Jay-Z then begins the second verse while in a temple-like area. Kanye West sings his verse in a cave-like area holding a torch and having a bandanna cover his face like Jay-Z and Rihanna. Throughout the video, the trio are on a stage platform with the mob of protesters previously shown surrounding them.

Daniel Kreps of Rolling Stone called the video, "a civilization that takes Jigga's lyrical motif of 'all black everything' very seriously." He further added, "When we first heard 'Run This Town', we pictured Jay-Z and his posse staging a siege on Manhattan, or at least going to all the VIP spots most civilians only dream about like in the "D.O.A. (Death of Autotune)" video. Instead, we're introduced to a Mad Max-like landscape full of proto-biker gear, torches, face scarves and bombed-out buildings. Jay-Z and his gang of ruffians actually look like they're on a mission to slay Auto-Tune. Also, according to the video, Rihanna is the only female to survive the apocalypse, and West's verse about Reeboks, Rav4s and girls with two bee stings seem starkly out of place in the dismal future." It ranked at number eleven on BET's Notarized: Top 100 Videos of 2009 countdown.

== Usage in media ==
"Run this Town" has been used in the video games NBA 2K13 and NBA 2K26. The song was featured in the teaser trailer for 2013 video game Battlefield 4 and the trailer for the 2022 movie The 355. It was to be included in coverage of Thursday Night Football on CBS and the NFL Network in 2014, however, it was pulled from the opening segment in the first broadcast in the wake of a domestic violence controversy involving NFL player Ray Rice. After Rihanna took to Twitter to complain, the song was removed from further games. The song was performed at the closing ceremony at the 2012 Summer Paralympics in London with British rock band Coldplay and Rihanna. Rihanna performed the song as part of her set during the halftime show of Super Bowl LVII.

== Track listing ==
- Digital download
1. "Run This Town" (featuring Rihanna and Kanye West) (single version) – 4:34
- CD single
1. "Run This Town" (featuring Rihanna and Kanye West) (single version) – 4:34
2. "D.O.A. (Death of Auto-Tune)" – 4:15

== Charts ==
=== Weekly charts ===
2009 weekly chart performance
Chart (2009)	Peak position
Australia (ARIA)	9
Austria (Ö3 Austria Top 40)	29
Belgium (Ultratop 50 Flanders)	28
Belgium (Ultratop 50 Wallonia)	32
Canada Hot 100 (Billboard)	6
Czech Republic (IFPI)	8
Euro Digital Song Sales (Billboard)	2
Euro Digital Tracks (Billboard) Explicit version	1
Finland Download (Latauslista)	19
Denmark (Tracklisten)	20
France Download (SNEP)	37
Germany (GfK)	18
Hungary (Rádiós Top 40)	25
Ireland (IRMA)	3
Israel International Airplay (Media Forest)	4
Netherlands (Dutch Top 40)	10
Netherlands (Mega Single Top 100)	30
New Zealand (Recorded Music NZ)	9
Norway (VG-lista)	5
Slovakia (IFPI)	33
Sweden (Sverigetopplistan)	8
Switzerland (Schweizer Hitparade)	9
UK Singles (Official Charts)	1
UK Hip Hop/R&B (Official Charts)	1
US Billboard Hot 100	2
US Dance Airplay (Billboard)	22
US Hot R&B/Hip-Hop Songs (Billboard)	3
US Hot Rap Songs (Billboard)	1
US Pop Airplay (Billboard)	8
US Rhythmic Airplay (Billboard)	1

2023 weekly chart performance
Chart (2023)	Peak position
Canadian Digital Song Sales (Billboard)	49
Global 200 (Billboard)	139

=== Year-end charts ===
Year-end chart performance
Chart (2009)	Position
Australia (ARIA)	60
Australia Hip-Hop/R&B Singles (ARIA)	16
Canada Hot 100 (Billboard)	53
Hungary (Rádiós Top 40)	126
Netherlands (Dutch Top 40)	73
Sweden (Sverigetopplistan)	87
Switzerland (Schweizer Hitparade)	84
UK Singles (Official Charts)	60
US Billboard Hot 100	31
US Hot R&B/Hip-Hop Songs (Billboard)	46
US Radio Songs (Billboard)	29
US Rhythmic Airplay (Billboard)	18

== Certifications ==
Certifications
Region	Certification	Certified units/sales
Australia (ARIA)	Platinum	70,000^{^}
Brazil (Pro-Música Brasil)	Gold	30,000^{‡}
Denmark (IFPI Danmark)	Platinum	90,000^{‡}
Germany (BVMI)	Gold	150,000^{‡}
Italy (FIMI)	Gold	50,000^{‡}
New Zealand (RMNZ)	3× Platinum	90,000^{‡}
United Kingdom (BPI)	2× Platinum	1,200,000^{‡}
United States (RIAA)	6× Platinum	6,000,000^{‡}
^{^} Shipments figures based on certification alone.^{‡} Sales+streaming figures based on certification alone.

== Release history ==
Release history and formats
Country	Date	Format	Label
United States	August 9, 2009	Urban radio	
Australia	August 10, 2009	Digital download	
Austria	August 10, 2009	Digital download	
Belgium	August 10, 2009	Digital download	
Brazil	August 10, 2009	Digital download	
Canada	August 10, 2009	Digital download	
Denmark	August 10, 2009	Digital download	
Finland	August 10, 2009	Digital download	
France	August 10, 2009	Digital download	
Germany	August 10, 2009	Digital download	
Ireland	August 10, 2009	Digital download	
Italy	August 10, 2009	Digital download	
Mexico	August 10, 2009	Digital download	
Netherlands	August 10, 2009	Digital download	
New Zealand	August 10, 2009	Digital download	
Norway	August 10, 2009	Digital download	
Sweden	August 10, 2009	Digital download	
Switzerland	August 10, 2009	Digital download	
United Kingdom	August 10, 2009	Digital download	
United States	August 10, 2009	Digital download	
United Kingdom	August 31, 2009	CD single	
Germany	September 9, 2009	CD single	
