= On to the Next One =

Single by Jay-Z featuring Swizz Beatz

from the album The Blueprint 3
- Released: December 15, 2009
- Studio: Roc The Mic Studios; Oven Studios (New York City)
- Genre: Hip-hop; alternative hip-hop
- Length: 4:16
- Label: Roc Nation; Atlantic
- Songwriters: Shawn Carter; Kasseem Dean; Gaspard Augé; Xavier de Rosnay; Jessie Chaton
- Producer: Swizz Beatz

Jay-Z singles chronology
"Empire State of Mind" (2009)	"On to the Next One" (2009)	"I Wanna Rock (The Kings' G-Mix)" (2010)

Swizz Beatz singles chronology
"I Can Transform Ya" (2009)	"On to the Next One" (2009)	"Fancy" (2010)

Music video
- "On to the Next One" on YouTube

"On to the Next One" is a song by American rapper Jay-Z, released on December 15, 2009 as the fourth single from his eleventh studio album The Blueprint 3 on his Roc Nation label and also released as the fourth single in the United Kingdom after "Young Forever". The song features additional rap vocals and music production from Swizz Beatz as well as a vocal sample of the words "under the spotlight" and a background synthesizer sound from the live version of Justice's song "D.A.N.C.E.".

The song won the Grammy Award for Best Rap Performance by a Duo or Group at the 53rd Annual Grammy Awards, marking Jay-Z's 13th Grammy Award overall as well as Swizz Beatz's first Grammy Award win and making Jay-Z the first artist to have all four singles from one album win six Grammy Awards in their respective category. The song has been frequently used for freestyles, notably by Ab-Soul, Bun B, Crooked I and Red Café. This song was also part of the soundtrack of NBA 2K13, which was selected by Jay-Z, and has been used as part of Peloton's television commercials promoting their interactive spinning cycle.

== Promotion ==
The song was first performed at Jay-Z's Answer the Call benefit concert in Madison Square Garden on September 11, 2009. It was also performed in the UK on Friday Night with Jonathan Ross on February 19, 2010.

== Critical reception ==
Devin Chanda from Billboard magazine gave the song a positive review:

"More than any of its predecessors, 'On to the Next One' best accomplishes what Jay-Z set out to do with 'The Blueprint 3': stay the course of trendsetter."

== Music video ==
The highly surreal music video, directed by Sam Brown and filmed in black-and-white and at a 4:3 aspect ratio in November 2009, premiered on January 1, 2010 on New Year's Eve with Carson Daly. Although uploaded to YouTube the previous day, New Year's Eve 2009, it has been called the first music video of the decade.

The people, symbols, and characters featured in the video are seen in black-and-white colors. Split-second scenes occur throughout the video showing abundant biblical references, such as crucifixes, angelic symbols, a skull reminiscent of Damien Hirst's famous sculpture For the Love of God, and Baphomet. During part of the music video, the music stops, and producer Swizz Beatz appears with his back turned to the viewer as he makes the symbol of Baphomet with his coat by raising his hands, and at approximately three minutes and thirty nine seconds into the video, there are two bullets on either side of a crucifix. Jay-Z wears a leather jacket and sunglasses for the video, in which rapper Young Jeezy cameos. Colin Bailey, better known as Drums of Death, who is known for his skull face paint, also cameos in the video, appearing either perplexed or mad.

== Charts ==
=== Weekly charts ===
Chart (2009–2010)	Peak position
Canada Hot 100 (Billboard)	58
UK Singles (Official Charts)	38
UK Hip Hop/R&B (Official Charts)	13
US Billboard Hot 100	37
US Hot R&B/Hip-Hop Songs (Billboard)	9
US Hot Rap Songs (Billboard)	5

=== Year-end charts ===
Chart (2010)	Position
US Hot R&B/Hip-Hop Songs (Billboard)	54

== Certifications ==
Region	Certification	Certified units/sales
United States (RIAA)	Platinum	1,000,000^{‡}
^{‡} Sales+streaming figures based on certification alone.
