= The Blueprint 3 =

Studio album by Jay-Z
- Released: September 8, 2009
- Recorded: July 2008 – August 2009
- Studios: Roc the Mic (New York City); Avex Recording Studio (Honolulu); Kingdom Studios (Perth); The Holy Chataeu (Perth); Baseline Studios (New York City); Westlake Recording Studios (Los Angeles); Oven Studios (New York City); KMA Studios (New York City); Lava Studios (Cleveland); Record Plant (Los Angeles); South Beach Studios (Miami); Midnight Blue Studios (Miami)
- Genres: Hip-hop; pop rap; alternative hip-hop
- Length: 60:44
- Labels: Roc Nation; Atlantic; WMGreen
- Producers: Kanye West; No I.D.; Shux; Janet Sewell-Ulepic; Angela Hunte; The Inkredibles; Swizz Beatz; Timbaland; J-Roc; Kenoe; Jeff Bhasker; The Neptunes

Jay-Z chronology
| American Gangster (2007) | The Blueprint 3 (2009) | The Hits Collection, Volume One (2010) |

Singles from The Blueprint 3
- 1. "D.O.A. (Death of Auto-Tune)" Released: June 5, 2009; 2. "Run This Town" Released: July 24, 2009; 3. "Empire State of Mind" Released: September 1, 2009; 4. "On to the Next One" Released: December 15, 2009; 5. "Young Forever" Released: January 11, 2010; 6. "A Star Is Born" Released: June 25, 2010

The Blueprint 3 is the eleventh studio album by American rapper Jay-Z, released September 8, 2009, on Roc Nation; through distribution from Atlantic Records. It is the third album in the Blueprint series, preceded by The Blueprint (2001) and The Blueprint 2: The Gift & The Curse (2002). Production for the album took place during 2008 to 2009 at several recording studios and was handled by Kanye West, No I.D., The Neptunes, Jeff Bhasker, Al Shux, Jerome "J-Roc" Harmon, The Inkredibles, Swizz Beatz, and Timbaland. The album also features guest appearances by Kanye West and Swizz Beatz themselves, his wife Beyoncé, as well as Rihanna, Drake, Kid Cudi, Young Jeezy, J. Cole, Alicia Keys, Luke Steele, and Pharrell Williams.

The Blueprint 3 produced six singles: "D.O.A. (Death of Auto-Tune)", "Run This Town", " "Empire State of Mind", "On to the Next One", "Young Forever" and "A Star Is Born". Each of which gained success on the Billboard Hot 100, excluding the latter. The album received generally positive reviews from music critics and was a commercial success. It debuted atop the US Billboard 200 chart, selling 476,000 copies in its first week. It became Jay-Z's eleventh US number-one album, breaking the record he had previously shared with Elvis Presley. The album received a nomination for Best Rap Album, while four of its singles "D.O.A. (Death of Auto-Tune)", "Run This Town", "On to the Next One", and "Empire State of Mind" won a combined number of six Grammys at both the 52nd Annual Grammy Awards and 53rd Annual Grammy Awards.

== Background ==
The earliest hype over The Blueprint 3 came when DJ Clue released in January 2008 a mixtape song called "Ain't I", produced by Timbaland. In the intro, Clue says, "Off that Blueprint 3 baby!" However, a spokesperson for Jay-Z said that it was an old, unreleased song and that the recording of The Blueprint 3 had not yet started. On July 20, Timbaland, a frequent contributor to previous Jay-Z albums, told MTV News that he would be producing the whole album. But in an interview with the Rolling Stone magazine, Jay-Z called the statement "premature". In July 2009, Jay-Z confirmed The Blueprint 3 as the album's title during an interview with radio station Shade 45.

By November 2008, he had finished the album but with lengthy negotiations with Def Jam, he went on to reworking it. In January 2009, Jay-Z confirmed continued production of the album and admitted the leak of several songs. In a Billboard magazine interview, Jay-Z confirmed "What We Talkin' About", the album's intro, "Thank You" and "Already Home" as song names, and collaborations with Australian electronic music group Empire of the Sun, rappers Drake and Kid Cudi and singer Rihanna. He also mentioned in an interview with DJ Semtex that his favorite song on the album is "Empire State of Mind". The official track list for Blueprint 3 was revealed on August 18, confirming the guest appearances from Kanye West, Rihanna, Drake, Kid Cudi, Young Jeezy, J. Cole, Alicia Keys, and more.

== Artwork ==
The cover consists of all-white instruments and recording tools stacked in a corner with three red bars superimposed across the image. To create the cover, instead of using photo editing software, the album's design team stacked all the equipment in the corner of a room before using a projector to create the bars. They then painted red onto the equipment where the projection of the bars was, and replaced the projector with a camera to achieve the correct perspective for the image. Blueprint 3 would be Jay-Z's first album to not feature his face on its cover art.

== Recording ==
Most of the album's recording sessions took place in Hawaii at Avex Honolulu Studio, in an effort to avoid leakage. West's protégé Mr Hudson explained to The Times that he "won't get bothered there" compared to a major city such as New York or Los Angeles. Sessions for the album took place during 2008 to 2009 at Avex Honolulu Studio and several other recording studios, including Germano Studios, Oven Studios, and Roc The Mic in New York City, Kingdom Studios and Lava Studios in Cleveland, Midnight Blue Studios and South Beach Studios in Miami, The Holy Chateau in Perth, Australia, and Westlake Studio in Los Angeles.

Jay-Z told Rolling Stone his method of selecting producers: "If Timbaland makes ten great tracks then he produces the album, if Kanye West makes ten great tracks then he produces the album; if he makes three, I'll take three. I let the music dictate the direction." However, the final track listing reveals, that West produced the majority of tracks on the album, and three done by Timbaland. West confirmed two songs, "A Star Is Born" and "Young Forever", during an appearance on The Wake Up Show in February 2009. Mr Hudson, who is the featured artist on the latter, described it as a flip on the Alphaville record of a similar name. During a joint interview with Hudson, West confirmed that the pop artist would be featured on three songs. Pharrell stated that he emailed "So Ambitious" to Jay-Z the day he was mastering the album. He loved the track so much that he put off the mastering.

== Release and promotion ==
The album was released September 8, 2009 on Roc Nation in the United States. It was also released digitally on September 11, 2009, in the US, and its United Kingdom and international release followed on September 14 that same year. Prior to its official release, the album leaked in its entirety on August 31, 2009. When asked about the leak, Jay-Z stated "It's a preview. I'm excited for people to hear the album. I'm very proud of the work I've done, so enjoy it".

The album's first single "D.O.A. (Death of Auto-Tune)" was premiered on June 5, 2009, via New York radio station Hot 97. On June 7, 2009, Jay-Z made a guest appearance at Hot 97's Summer Jam concert, and performed D.O.A. live on stage, for the first time. On May 20, 2009, Jay-Z confirmed that he bought out the remainder of his contract from Def Jam Records in order to start his contract with Live Nation, as The Blueprint 3 was set to be released under Roc Nation and distributed by Atlantic Records. In August 2008, Jay-Z performed the Kanye West–produced song "Jockin' Jay-Z" during the latter's Glow in the Dark Tour.

== Critical reception ==
Professional ratings
Aggregate scores
| Source | Rating |
|---|---|
| AnyDecentMusic? | 6.3/10 |
| Metacritic | 68/100 |
Review scores
| Source | Rating |
| AllMusic | 4/5 stars |
| Entertainment Weekly | B+ |
| The Guardian | 3/5 stars |
| The Independent | 4/5 stars |
| MSN Music (Consumer Guide) | A− |
| NME | 4/5 stars |
| Pitchfork | 4.5/10 |
| Rolling Stone | 3/5 stars |
| Slant Magazine | 3.5/5 stars |
| The Sunday Times | 2/5 stars |

According to the review aggregator Metacritic, The Blueprint 3 received "generally favorable reviews" based on a weighted average score of 68 out of 100 from 12 critic scores. In his review for MSN Music, Robert Christgau called the album "fairly superb" and gave it an A− rating, indicating "the kind of garden-variety good record that is the great luxury of musical micromarketing and overproduction". AllMusic writer John Bush compared the album to its predecessors, describing it as "somewhere between the two, closer to the vitality and energy of the original but not without the crossover bids and guest features of the latter (albeit much better this time)". Leah Greenblatt of Entertainment Weekly commented that the album succeeds at its goal of "reaching maximum commercial blast radius while maintaining its street bona fides".

The Daily Telegraph gave the album four out of five stars and complimented its modern sound. The A.V. Club gave it a B+ rating and stated, "Jay-Z sounds liberated by his legacy rather than weighed down by expectations". Despite noting inconsistency in Jay-Z's rapping, Jon Caramanica of The New York Times complimented the album's varied musical elements and called it "an unexpected blend of maturity and youth". Pete Cashmore of NME commented that it "delivers because of hefty beats and quality rapsmanship, nothing else. And, ultimately, that'll do just fine". Kiilian Fox of The Observer commented that Jay-Z is "maturing into a responsible elder statesman". Zach Baron of The Village Voice viewed that "much of Blueprint 3 is about the weird, meta-rap work of redefining what it is to be a boss" and stated "Jay-Z's midlife crisis is over. Which doesn't make The Blueprint 3 a classic. But we'll take it. For now".

In a mixed review, Slant Magazine's William McBee found The Blueprint 3 "predictable", "complacent", and "a hip-hop feast, for sure, filled to the brim with elite production and elite rapping, but it lacks the hungriness, the spirit, and the craziness that marks a classic album". Rolling Stone's Jody Rosen called it "a catchy, pop-friendly record", but viewed that it lacks the "electric charge" of Jay-Z's previous albums and that he is "stuck for a subject [...] But he says it well". Alexis Petridis of The Guardian wrote that it "peters out in a mass of indistinct tracks" following its first four songs. The Sunday Times criticized the music's "insistent straining for a crossover, pop-coloured sheen", writing that it "mires much of the album in insipidness, coating stale braggadocio (without, mostly, any compensating humour)." Pitchfork's Ian Cohen commented that it is "so certainly Jay-Z's weakest solo album, you'll be tempted to wonder if Kingdom Come was somehow underrated". Greg Kot of the Los Angeles Times gave the album two-and-a-half out of four stars and viewed Jay-Z's celebrity and older age as somewhat of a flaw, stating:

It's tough for hip-hop stars to age well. Once they become celebrities living in mansions and starring in family movies, street cred is usually the first thing to go. Just ask Ice Cube. Longevity just wasn't built into the hip-hop lifestyle, with its premium on youthful swagger, street tales and fast turnover [...] 'The Blueprint 3' aims to show everyone he still has wicked skills on the mic. It does, even as it illustrates that sometimes he coasts on his celebrity [...] The message: Don't mess with ol' Gray-Z.

The Blueprint 3 was ranked the best album of the year by Billboard, and seventh best album of the year by MTV. Rolling Stone named it the fourth best album of 2009 in its year-end list.

== Commercial performance ==
The Blueprint 3 debuted at number one on the US Billboard 200 chart selling 476,000 copies in its first week. This became Jay-Z's eleventh number one album, breaking the record he had previously shared with Elvis Presley. It also serves as the third-highest first-week sales of 2009. In its second week, the album remained at number one on the chart, selling an additional 298,000 copies. In its third week, the album dropped to number two on the chart, selling 134,000 more copies. In its fourth week, the album dropped to number six on the chart, selling 89,000 more copies. On November 13, 2009, the album was certified platinum by the Recording Industry Association of America (RIAA) for shipments of over one million copies. In 2009, the album was the ninth best-selling album in the US, selling over 1.52 million copies in four months. As of August 2012, the album has sold 1,933,000 copies in the United States. The album sold over 3 million records worldwide.

== Track listing ==
The Blueprint 3 track listing
| No. | Title | Writer(s) | Producer(s) | Length |
|---|---|---|---|---|
| 1. | "What We Talkin' About" (featuring Luke Steele) | Shawn Carter; Kanye West; Ernest Wilson; Kevin Randolph; Frédéric Mercier | Kanye West; No I.D. | 4:04 |
| 2. | "Thank You" | Carter; Kanye West; Wilson; Marcos Valle | Kanye West; No I.D. | 4:10 |
| 3. | "D.O.A. (Death of Auto-Tune)" | Carter; Wilson; Garrett DeCarlo; Dale Frashuer; Paul Leka; Janko Nilović; Dave Sucky | No I.D. | 4:15 |
| 4. | "Run This Town" (featuring Rihanna and Kanye West) | Carter; Kanye West; Wilson; Jeff Bhasker; Robyn Fenty; Athanasios Alatas | Kanye West; No I.D.; Bhasker | 4:27 |
| 5. | "Empire State of Mind" (with Alicia Keys) | Carter; Alexander Shuckburgh; Janet Sewell-Ulepic; Angela Hunte; Alicia Keys; Burt Keyes; Sylvia Robinson | Shux; Sewell-Ulepic^{[a]}; Hunte^{[a]} | 4:36 |
| 6. | "Real as It Gets" (featuring Jeezy) | Carter; Jay Jenkins; Maurice Carpenter; Leigh Elliott; Johnny Mollings; Lenny Mollings | The Inkredibles | 4:12 |
| 7. | "On to the Next One" (featuring Swizz Beatz) | Carter; Kasseem Dean; Gaspard Augé; Xavier de Rosnay; Jesse Chaton | Swizz Beatz | 4:17 |
| 8. | "Off That" (featuring Drake) | Carter; Timothy Mosley; Jerome Harmon; Aubrey Graham | Timbaland; J-Roc | 4:06 |
| 9. | "A Star Is Born" (featuring J. Cole) | Carter; Kanye West; Wilson; Jermaine Cole; Maurice Jordan; Al Goodman; George Medoro | Kanye West; No I.D.; Kenoe^{[b]} | 3:48 |
| 10. | "Venus vs. Mars" | Carter; Mosley; Harmon | Timbaland; JRoc | 3:10 |
| 11. | "Already Home" (featuring Kid Cudi) | Carter; Kanye West; Wilson; Scott Mescudi; Harry Mudie | Kanye West; No I.D.^{[b]}; Bhasker^{[b]} | 4:29 |
| 12. | "Hate" (featuring Kanye West) | Carter; Kanye West; Bhasker | Kanye West; Bhasker | 2:31 |
| 13. | "Reminder" | Carter; Mosley; Harmon; Karin Briscoe | Timbaland; JRoc | 4:18 |
| 14. | "So Ambitious" (featuring Pharrell) | Carter; Pharrell Williams | The Neptunes | 4:12 |
| 15. | "Young Forever" (featuring Mr Hudson) | Carter; Kanye West; Marian Gold; Bernhard Lloyd; Frank Mertens | Kanye West | 4:13 |
| Total length: | | | | 60:44 |

=== Notes ===
- ^{^[a]} signifies a co-producer.
- ^{^[b]} signifies an additional producer.
- "A Star Is Born" features additional vocals by Tony Williams.
- "Venus vs. Mars" features additional vocals by Beyoncé.
- "Reminder" features additional vocals by K. Briscoe.

=== Sample credits ===
- "What We Talkin' About" contains a sample of "Spirit", by Frédéric Mercier.
- "Thank You" contains excerpts from "Ele E Ela" as performed by Marcos Valle.
- "D.O.A. (Death of Auto-Tune)" contains elements of "Na Na Hey Hey Kiss Him Goodbye" by Steam and also contains a sample of "In the Space" by Janko Nilović & Dave Sucky.
- "Run This Town" contains samples of "Someday In Athens" by The 4 Levels of Existence.
- "Empire State of Mind" contains samples of "Love on a Two Way Street" performed by The Moments.
- "On to the Next One" contains samples of "D.A.N.C.E." by Justice.
- "A Star Is Born" contains samples of "Touch Me" by The Mother Freedom Band.
- "Already Home" contains a sample of "Mad Mad Ivy" by Gladstone Anderson and the Mudies All-Stars.
- "Young Forever" contains a sample of "Forever Young" by Alphaville.

== Personnel ==
Artists

- Jay-Z – primary artist (all tracks), executive producer
- Luke Steele – featured artist (track 1)
- Kanye West – featured artist (tracks 4, 12)
- Rihanna – featured artist (track 4)
- Alicia Keys – featured artist (track 5)
- Young Jeezy – featured artist (track 6)
- Swizz Beatz – featured artist (track 7)
- Drake – featured artist (track 8)
- J. Cole – featured artist (track 9)
- Kid Cudi – featured artist (track 11)
- Pharrell – featured artist (track 14)
- Mr Hudson – featured artist (track 15)
- Cassie – background artist (track 10)
- Beyoncé – background artist (track 10)
- K. Briscoe – background artist (track 13)

Technical

- Tony Dawsey – mastering
- Gimel "Young Guru" Keaton – mixing (tracks 1–4, 6, 7, 9, 12, 15), recording (tracks 1–12, 14, 15)
- Ken "Duro" Ifill – mixing (track 5)
- Chris Godbey – mixing, recording (tracks 8, 10, 13)
- Fabian Marasciulloet – mixing (track 14)
- Andrew Dawson – recording (tracks 1, 2, 9, 11, 12, 15)
- Marcos Tovar – recording (track 4)
- Karl Heilbron – recording (track 6,8,)
- Miki Tsutsumi – recording (track 7)
- Andrew Coleman – recording, digital editing and arrangement (track 14)
- Luke Steele – recording (track 1, Steele's vocals)
- Ann Mincieli – recording (track 5, Keys' vocals)
- Dom Monteleone – engineer (track 1)
- Jordan "DJ Swivel" Young – mixing assistant (track 5)
- Ramon Rivas – mixing assistant (track 14)
- Hart Gunther – digital editing and arrangement assistant (track 14)
- Jason Wilkie – digital editing and arrangement assistant (track 14)

Production

- Kanye West – production (tracks 1, 2, 4, 9, 11, 12, 15), executive producer
- No I.D. – production (tracks 1–4, 9), additional production (track 11)
- Shux – production (track 5)
- The Neptunes – production (track 14)
- Pharrell Williams – production (track 14)
- Chad Hugo – production (track 14)
- Angela Hunte – co-production (track 5)
- Jane't "Jnay" Sewell Ulepic – co-production (track 5)
- Kenoe – additional production (track 9)
- Jeff Bhasker – keys (tracks 1, 2, 9, 11, 12, 15), additional production (track 11)
- Kevin Randolph – keys (track 1)

Additional personnel

- The Carter Administration – A&R
- Lanre Gaba – A&R administration
- Fabienne Leys – A&R administration
- Roc Nation – marketing
- Eric Wong – marketing
- Jana Fleishman – publicity
- Sheila Richman – publicity
- Roc Nation Management – management
- Greg Gigendad Burke – creative direction & design
- Dan Tobin Smith – photography
- Michael Guido – legal council
- Jennifer Justice – legal council
- Renee Karalian – legal council

== Charts ==
=== Weekly charts ===
| Chart (2009) | Peak position |
|---|---|
| Australian Albums (ARIA) | 9 |
| Austrian Albums (Ö3 Austria) | 37 |
| Belgian Albums (Ultratop Flanders) | 25 |
| Belgian Albums (Ultratop Wallonia) | 33 |
| Canadian Albums (Billboard) | 1 |
| Danish Albums (Hitlisten) | 36 |
| Dutch Albums (Album Top 100) | 12 |
| French Albums (SNEP) | 20 |
| German Albums (Offizielle Top 100) | 22 |
| Irish Albums (IRMA) | 3 |
| Italian Albums (FIMI) | 95 |
| Japanese Albums (Oricon) | 15 |
| New Zealand Albums (RMNZ) | 10 |
| Norwegian Albums (VG-lista) | 15 |
| Scottish Albums (Official Charts) | 5 |
| Swedish Albums (Sverigetopplistan) | 44 |
| Swiss Albums (Schweizer Hitparade) | 12 |
| UK Albums (Official Charts) | 4 |
| UK R&B Albums (Official Charts) | 1 |
| US Billboard 200 | 1 |
| US Top R&B/Hip-Hop Albums (Billboard) | 1 |
| US Top Rap Albums (Billboard) | 1 |

=== Year-end charts ===
| Chart (2009) | Position |
|---|---|
| Australian Urban Albums (ARIA) | 17 |
| Canadian Albums (Billboard) | 36 |
| UK Albums (OCC) | 62 |
| US Billboard 200 | 12 |
| US Top R&B/Hip-Hop Albums (Billboard) | 4 |
| Chart (2010) | Position |
| Australian Urban Albums (ARIA) | 21 |
| French Albums (SNEP)[ | 192 |
| UK Albums (OCC) | 91 |
| US Billboard 200 | 44 |
| US Top R&B/Hip-Hop Albums (Billboard) | 12 |

== Certifications ==
| Region | Certification | Certified units/sales |
|---|---|---|
| Australia (ARIA) | Gold | 35,000^{^} |
| Canada (Music Canada) | Platinum | 80,000^{^} |
| France (SNEP) | Gold | 50,000^{*} |
| Ireland (IRMA) | Gold | 7,500^{^} |
| Italy (FIMI) | Gold | 25,000^{‡} |
| United Kingdom (BPI) | Platinum | 396,018 |
| United States (RIAA) | 2× Platinum | 2,000,000^{‡} |
^{*} Sales figures based on certification alone.^{^} Shipments figures based on certification alone.^{‡} Sales+streaming figures based on certification alone.

== See also ==
- List of Billboard 200 number-one albums of 2009
- List of Billboard number-one R&B albums of 2009
