= Sauce Money discography =

- Studio albums: 1
- Singles: 3

The discography of Sauce Money, an American rapper from New York, is composed of one studio album, three singles and numerous guest appearances.

== Albums ==
=== Studio albums ===
List of studio albums, with selected chart positions
Title	Album details	Peak chart positions			
Title	Album details	US	US R&B/HH	US Rap	US Indie
Middle Finger U.	Released: May 23, 2000; Label: Priority Records	72	19	—	—
"—" denotes releases that did not chart, or was not released in that country.

== Singles ==
Year	Song	Chart positions		Album
Year	Song	US	US R&B	Album
1997	"Action..."	—	—	Non-album single
1997	"I`ll be missing you"	1	1	Single lyrics
2000	"Middle Finger U."	—	82	Middle Finger U

== Guest appearances ==
List of non-single guest appearances, with other performing artists, showing year released and album name
Title	Year	Other artist(s)	Album
"Hit"	1994	Original Flavor	Beyond Flavor
"Show & Prove"	1994	Big Daddy Kane, Jay-Z, Ol' Dirty Bastard, Scoob Lover, Shyheim	Daddy's Home
"Bring It On"	1996	Jay-Z, Big Jaz	Reasonable Doubt
"Foundation"	1996	Big Jaz, Jay-Z, Tone Hooker	—N/a
"Big Dog Stomp"	1996	Shaquille O'Neal	You Can't Stop the Reign
"Against the Grain"	1997	—N/a	Soul in the Hole (soundtrack)
"Face Off"	1997	Jay-Z	In My Lifetime, Vol. 1
"Celebration"	1998	Jay-Z, Memphis Bleek, WAIS	Streets Is Watching (soundtrack)
"From Marcy to Hollywood"	1998	Jay-Z, Memphis Bleek	The Players Club: soundtrack
"What the Game Made Me"	1998	Jay-Z, Memphis Bleek	I Got the Hook-Up (soundtrack)
"Pre Game"	1998	Jay-Z	Belly (soundtrack)/Middle Finger U
"I Wasn't With It (Remix)"	1998	Jesse Powell	Bout It
"Everything You Do" (Mark Ronson Remix)	1998	Eboni Foster	—N/a
"Voices"	1998	Shaquille O'Neal	Respect
"Reservoir Dogs"	1998	Jay-Z, The Lox, Beanie Sigel	Vol. 2... Hard Knock Life
"Tell Me What You Like"	1998	Aaron Hall	Inside of You {Japan Bonus Track}
"Slow Down"	1999	Jane Blaze	The Corruptor: The Soundtrack
"Reverse"	1999	Puff Daddy, Busta Rhymes, Cee-Lo, G-Dep, Redman, Shyne	Forever
"Yo Love"	1999	Blackstreet	Finally
"Get Breaded"	1999	E-40, Fat Joe, Trayce	Charlie Hustle: The Blueprint of a Self-Made Millionaire
"Freestyle"	1999	Sway & King Tech	Wake Up Show Freestyles Vol. 5
"Sunstroke"	2000	Easy Mo Bee	Now or Never: Odyssey 2000
"Chart Climbin'"	2000	—N/a	3 Strikes (soundtrack) / Middle Finger U
"Freestyle"	2000	Sway & King Tech	Wake Up Show Freestyles Vol. 6
"Unfuckwitable"	2002	DJ Desue, Curse	The Art of War
"Coast to Coast Gangsters"	2003	DJ Kay Slay, Bun B, Joe Budden, Killer Mike, WC, Hak Ditty	The Streetsweeper, Vol. 1
"Hand on the Pump"	2004	DJ Kay Slay, The Game, Memphis Bleek	The Streetsweeper, Vol. 2 - The Pain from the Game
"Easy"	2004	P-Money	Magic City
"Sick the Dogz on 'Em"	2004	Papoose	The Beast From The East
"No Favors"	2010	Snowgoons, Da Ranjahz	Kraftwerk
"Silk"	2012	Raekwon, Big B, CL Smooth	Unexpected Victory
"Excuse Me"	2012	DJ Kay Slay, Gunplay, Vado, Uncle Murda	The Return Of The Gatekeeper
"Put Your Fist Up"	2012	DJ Kay Slay, Jim Jones, Tony Yayo	Grown Man Hip-Hop
"Bust Your Gun"	2014	DJ Kay Slay, Mysonne, Maino, Nathaniel	The Rise Of A City
"NYC Shine"	2014	DJ Kay Slay, Sheek Louch, Joell Ortiz	The Last Hip Hop Disciple
"Paper Chasing"	2014	DJ Kay Slay, Raekwon	The Last Hip Hop Disciple
"Back to the Bars, Pt. 2"	2020	DJ Kay Slay, Jon Connor, Nino Man, RJ Payne, Sheek Louch, Styles P, Vado	Living Legend
"Rolling 50 Deep"	2020	DJ Kay Slay, 3D Na'Tee, AZ, Benny the Butcher, M.O.P., Bun B, Bynoe, Cassidy, Chris Rivers, Cory Gunz, DJ Paul, Dave East, E-40, E-A-Ski, E.D.I., Fred the Godson, Ghostface Killah, Grandmaster Caz, McGruff, Hocus 45th, Ice-T, Joell Ortiz, Jon Connor, Loaded Lux, Locksmith, Maino, Melle Mel, Memphis Bleek, Mistah F.A.B., Mysonne, Nino Man, Papoose, RJ Payne, Raekwon, Ransom, Rockness, Royce Da 5'9", Saigon, Sheek Louch, Shoota93, Stan Spit, Styles P, Termanology, Trae tha Truth, Trick Trick, Twista, Uncle Murda, Vado, Young Noble	Homage
"Rolling 110 Deep"	2021	DJ Kay Slay, 3D Na'Tee, AZ, Aobie, Big Daddy Kane, Big Dubez, M.O.P., Black Thought, Bodega Bamz, Bumpy Knuckles, Bun B, Bynoe, Cassidy, Chris Rivers, Chuck D, Coke La Rock, Consequence, Conway the Machine, Cory Gunz, Crooked I, Dave East, DJ Doo-Wop, Drag-On, E-A-Ski, E.D.I., Fred the Godson, Fredro Starr, Ghostface Killah, Gillie da Kid, Brand Nubian, Grandmaster Caz, Nice & Smooth, Gunplay, Havoc, McGruff, Hocus 45th, Ice-T, Inspectah Deck, J.R. Writer, Jim Jones, Joell Ortiz, Jon Connor, Junior Reid, KRS-One, Kaflow Kaboom, King Kirk, Kool G Rap, Lil' Cease, Loaded Lux, Locksmith, Lord Tariq and Peter Gunz, MC Serch, MC Shan, Maino, Melle Mel, Merkules, Mike Cee, Millyz, Mistah F.A.B., Ms. Hustle, Mysonne, Nino Man, OT The Real, Omar Epps, Oun P, Page Kennedy, Papoose, Pretty Tone Capone, Prince The King, RJ Payne, Raekwon, Rah Digga, Ransom, Ras Kass, Kool DJ Red Alert, Redman, Rockness, Ron Artest, Roy Jones Jr., Royal Flush, Saigon, Shaquille O'Neal, Sheek Louch, Shoota 93, Sickflo, Sonja Blade, Stan Spit, Sticky Fingaz, Styleon, Styles P, Super Lover Cee, Termanology, Tone Trump, Tony Moxberg, Tracey Lee, Trae tha Truth, Tragedy Khadafi, Treach, Trick Trick, Twista, Uncle Murda, Vado, Wais P, Young Buck, Young Noble	Accolades
"Money Non-Stop"	2021	Nonchalant	For Alll NonBelievers
"keep tryin'"	2023	Ron Brownz	—N/a
"Bosses"	2024	Diamond D, Lord Tariq	The Diam Piece 3: Initium
