= Jay-Z 30 Tour =

2026 concert tour by Jay-Z

- Tour by Jay-Z
- Promotional poster
- Location: Europe; North America
- Associated album: Reasonable Doubt (30th anniversary); The Blueprint (25th anniversary)
- Start date: July 10, 2026
- End date: October 24, 2026
- No. of shows: 8
- Website: https://www.jayz30.com
Jay-Z tour chronology
On the Run II Tour (2018)	Jay-Z 30 Tour (2026)	Super Bowl LXI halftime show (2027)

The Jay-Z 30 Tour (stylized as JAŸ-Z30) was the ninth headlining concert tour by American rapper Jay-Z. The all-stadium tour was launched to celebrate the 30th anniversary of his debut studio album Reasonable Doubt and 25th anniversary of his sixth studio album The Blueprint. It began on July 10, 2026, in New York City, and concluded on October 24, 2026, in Los Angeles, United States.

Marking Jay-Z's first solo-live concerts since the 4:44 Tour in 2017, the tour received positive reviews from music critics, who praised both the production and the rapper's celebration of his career and hip-hop history. The show featured different set lists at various concert stops, with guest appearances by rappers Nas, Eminem, Lauryn Hill and Wyclef Jean of the Fugees, Jeezy, Swizz Beatz, and Pharrell Williams as well as singers Alicia Keys, Rihanna, Justin Timberlake, Usher, Teyana Taylor and his wife, Beyoncé.

== Background and development ==
After his 2017 solo concert tour, the 4:44 Tour, in support of his thirteenth studio album 4:44, Jay-Z co-headlined the On the Run II Tour with his wife Beyoncé in 2018. During the tour, the pair released their first collaborative album Everything Is Love, under the name The Carters. Following the tour, Jay-Z largely stepped away from recording and touring, appearing primarily as a featured artist on other musicians' releases and making only occasional live appearances.

From 2019 to 2024, Jay-Z made a limited number of televised performances, including appearances at the 65th Annual Grammy Awards and the 77th Tony Awards, where he joined Alicia Keys for a performance associated with her award-winning musical Hell's Kitchen. In 2025 Jay-Z made guest appearances during two dates of Beyoncé’s Cowboy Carter Tour.

In March 2026, Jay-Z announced a three shows at Yankee Stadium in the Bronx, New York City, scheduled for July 2026 to commemorate the 25th anniversary of The Blueprint and the 30th anniversary of Reasonable Doubt. On May 30, 2026, he headlined the 2026 Roots Picnic at the Belmont Plateau in Philadelphia, Pennsylvania, marking his first major concert performance in seven years.

In June 2026, Jay-Z and Roc Nation announced the Jay-Z 30 Tour, a concert series with stadium performances scheduled in Paris in September and Los Angeles in October. On July 9, 2026, he announced an additional show in London's Tottenham Hotspur Stadium for September 4, 2026.

== Production ==
The live instrumentation for the shows included a 10-piece band and an ensemble of 18 string players, which reimagine his classic tracks.

== Critical reception ==
The tour received rave reviews from critics, who praised the show considered intimate and minimal, and the celebration of his career and hip-hop history with special guests. Alexis Petridis, reviewing London concerts for The Guardian, gave to the show five out of five score. Petridis stated that the concert "feels less concerned with nostalgic reverie than a show of strength in the present day" praising Jay-Z capacity to rap and staging presence.

== Set list ==
The tour setlist was modified for the first three dates at Yankee Stadium, Bronx, New York City; each of the three concerts followed three themes, which were announced at the beginning of the show, focusing respectively on his debut studio album Reasonable Doubt (June 10), on his sixth studio album The Blueprint (June 11) and "Extra Innings", featuring singles from Jay-Z's entire discography.

=== First concert: "Reasonable Doubt" ===
This set list is representative of the show on July 10, 2026 at Yankee Stadium.

1. "Can't Knock the Hustle" (with Beyoncé)
2. “Politics as Usual”
3. JAY-Z’s Freestyle
4. "Brooklyn’s Finest"
5. "I Love the Dough" (with The Notorious B.I.G. recorded)
6. "Dead Presidents" (with Nas)
7. "Dead Presidents II"
8. "The World Is Yours"
9. "N.Y. State of Mind"
10. "Where I’m From"
11. "Feelin' It (with Blue Ivy Carter, Mecca and Alicia Keys)
12. “D’Evils”
13. “No Church in the Wild”
14. “Can I Live”
15. “Jigga My N***a”
16. "Ain't No Nigga"
17. “Excuse Me Miss”
18. “22 Two’s”
19. "Friend or Foe"
20. "Coming of Age" (with Memphis Bleek)
21. "Cashmere Thoughts"
22. "Allure"
23. "Bring It On" (with Jaz-O)
24. "Regrets"
25. "New York State of Mind / "Empire State of Mind" (with Alicia Keys)
26. "U Don’t Know"
27. "Best of Me (Part II)
28. “Blow the Whistle”
29. "La-La-La (Excuse Me Miss Again)"
30. "Mundian To Bach Ke (Beware of the Boys)"
31. "Change the Game"
32. "Do It Again (Put Ya Hands Up)"
33. "You, Me, Him and Her"
34. "Roc Boys (And the Winner Is…)"
35. "Public Service Announcement"
36. "N***as in Paris"
37. "Big Pimpin"

=== Second concert: "Blueprint Anniversary" ===
This set list is representative of the show on July 11, 2026 at Yankee Stadium.

1. “The Rulers Back” (with Slick Rick)
2. “Izzo”
3. “Girls Girls Girls”
4. “Jigga That N*gga”
5. “U Don’t Know”
6. “Hola Hovito”
7. “Heart Of The City”
8. “Never Change”
9. “Song Cry”
10. “All I Need”
11. "Renegade" (with Eminem)
12. “Blueprint (Momma Loves Me)”
13. “Empire State Of Mind”
14. “Excuse Me Miss” (with Pharrell Williams)
15. “La La La” (with Pharrell Williams)
16. “I Just Wanna Love U (with Pharrell Williams)
17. “Frontin’” (with Pharrell Williams)
18. “Allure” (with Pharrell Williams)
19. “Paris”
20. “PSA”
21. "Encore"

=== Third concert: "Extra Innings" ===
This set list is representative of the show on July 12, 2026 at Yankee Stadium.

1. "Dynasty Intro"
2. "Brooklyn's Finest"
3. "Where I'm From"
4. "Dirt off Your Shoulder"
5. "I Know"
6. "U Don’t Know" (with Teyana Taylor)
7. "Money Ain't a Thang" (with Jermaine Dupri)
8. "Seen It All" (with Jeezy)
9. "Go Crazy" (with Jeezy)
10. "Hola Hovito"
11. "Heart Of The City (Ain't No Love)" (with Usher)
12. "Throwback" / "Part II (On the Run)" (with Usher)
13. "Never Change"
14. "Song Cry"
15. "Izzo (H.O.V.A.)"
16. "Beach Is Better"
17. "Fuckwithmeuknowuigotit"
18. "Nigga What, Nigga Who (Originator 99)"
19. "No Church in the Wild" (with The-Dream)
20. "Clique"
21. "Run This Town" / "Bitch Better Have My Money" (with Rihanna)
22. "Dead Presidents"
23. "Can I Live?"
24. "Girls, Girls, Girls"/ "'03 Bonnie & Clyde"
25. "99 Problems"
26. "Money, Cash, Hoes" / "Ruff Ryders' Anthem" / "Welcome to the Jungle" / "So Appalled" (with Swizz Beatz)
27. "Jigga My Nigga" (with Swizz Beatz)
28. "On to the Next One" (with Swizz Beatz)
29. "Ain't No Nigga"
30. "Excuse Me Miss" (with Pharrell Williams)
31. "La-La-La" (with Pharrell Williams)
32. "I Just Wanna Love U (Give It 2 Me)" (with Pharrell Williams)
33. "Frontin'" (with Pharrell Williams)
34. "Allure" (with Pharrell Williams)
35. "Grindin" (with Clipse and Pharrell)
36. "Drunk in Love" / "Tom Ford" / "Partition" (with Beyoncé)
37. "Niggas in Paris" / "Big Pimpin'"
38. "Public Service Announcement"
39. "Empire State of Mind"
40. "New York" (with Fat Joe and Jadakiss)
41. "Dear Summer"
42. "Lucifer"
43. "Dirt off Your Shoulder"
44. Encore

== Shows ==
Date (2026)	City	Country	Venue	Attendance	Revenue
July 10	New York City	United States	Yankee Stadium	136,934 / 136,934	$42,290,766
July 11	New York City	United States	Yankee Stadium	136,934 / 136,934	$42,290,766
July 12	New York City	United States	Yankee Stadium	136,934 / 136,934	$42,290,766
September 4	London	England	Tottenham Hotspur Stadium	125,700 / 125,700	—
September 5	London	England	Tottenham Hotspur Stadium	125,700 / 125,700	—
September 10	Saint-Denis (Note: Labeled as Paris in promotional material.)	France	Stade de France	75,000 / 75,000	—
October 23	Inglewood (Note: Labeled as Los Angeles in promotional material.)	United States	SoFi Stadium	—	—
October 24	Inglewood	United States	SoFi Stadium	—	—
Total				—	—
