= List of songs recorded by Jay-Z =

Songs by American rapper

Songs recorded by Jay-Z
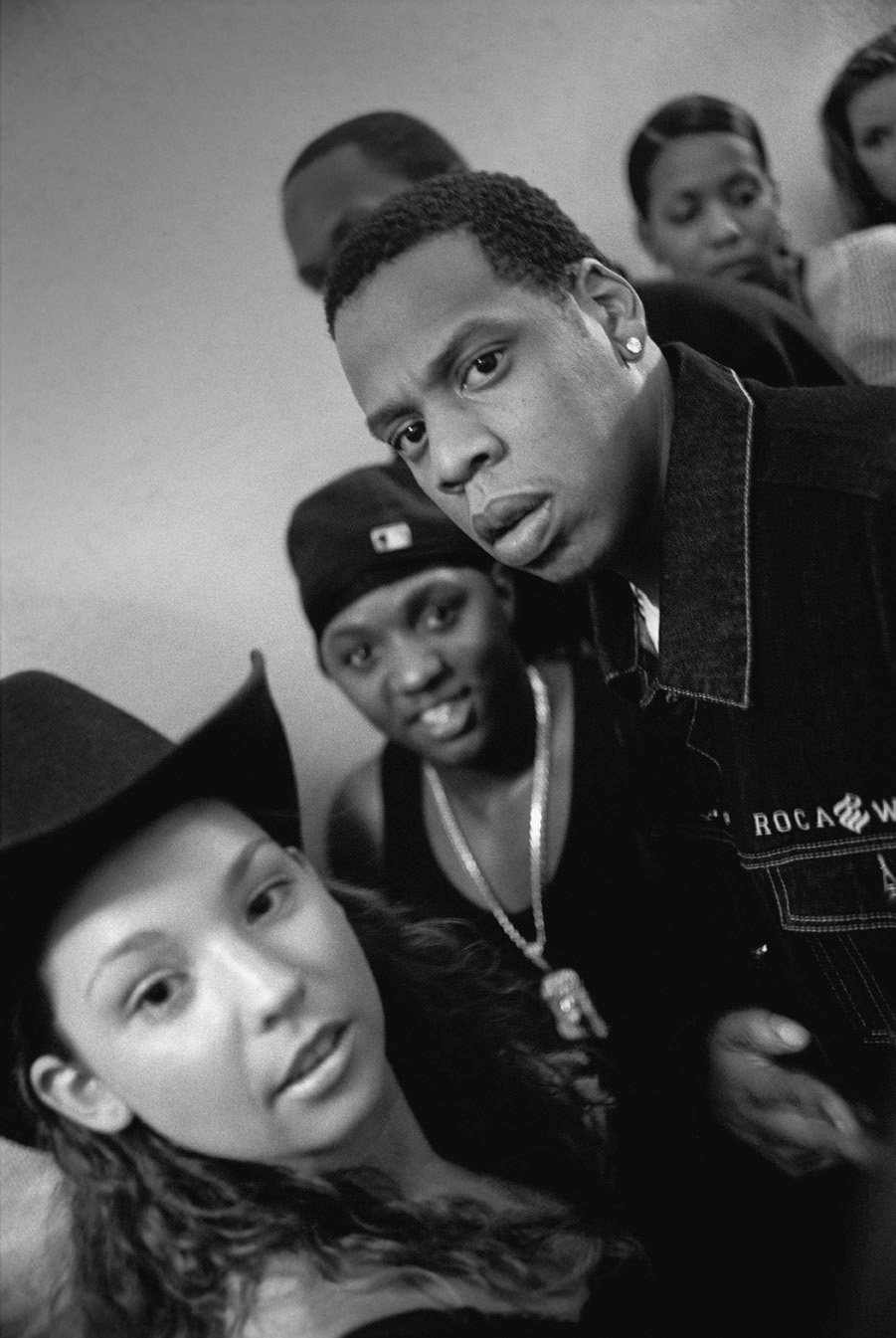
- Jay-Z (right) with Lil Cease in 2000
- Released songs: 336

The following is a list of songs by Jay-Z organized by alphabetical order. The songs on the list are all included in official label-released, albums, soundtracks and singles, but not white label or other non-label releases. Next to the song titles is the album, soundtrack or single on which it appears. Remixes and live versions of songs are listed as bullet points below the original song, but clean, explicit, a cappella and instrumental variations are not included.

Contents:	Top – 0-9 A B C D E F G H I J K L M N O P R S T U W Y External links

== 0–9 ==
1. "'03 Bonnie & Clyde" Featuring Beyoncé (The Blueprint 2: The Gift & The Curse, 2002)
2. "1-900-Hustler" Featuring Beanie Sigel, Memphis Bleek & Freeway (The Dynasty: Roc La Familia, 2000)
3. "100$ Bill" (The Great Gatsby: Music from Baz Luhrmann's Film, 2013)
4. "2 Many Hoes" (The Blueprint 2: The Gift & The Curse, 2002)
5. "8 Miles And Runnin" Featuring Freeway (8 Mile Soundtrack, 2002)
6. "20 Bag Shorty" Featuring Gotti, Fordy and Niela (The Projects Presents: Balhers Forever, 2000)
7. "22 Two's" (Reasonable Doubt, 1996)
8. "30 Something" (Kingdom Come, 2006)
9. "99 Problems" (The Black Album, 2003)
  - "Points of Authority/99 Problems/One Step Closer" with Linkin Park (Collision Course, 2004)

== A ==
1. "A Ballad for the Fallen Soldier" (The Blueprint 2: The Gift & The Curse, 2002)
2. "A Dream" Featuring Faith Evans & The Notorious B.I.G. (The Blueprint 2: The Gift & The Curse, 2002)
3. "A Million and One Questions" (In My Lifetime, Vol. 1, 1997)
4. "A Week Ago" Featuring Too Short (Vol. 2... Hard Knock Life, 1998)
5. "Addicted To the Game" (2001)
6. "Ain't I" (2008)
7. "Ain't No Nigga" Featuring Foxy Brown (Reasonable Doubt, 1996)
  - "Ain't No Nigga" Featuring Jaguar Wright (Jay-Z: Unplugged, 2001)
  - "Ain't No Nigga (Rae & Christian Mix)" Featuring Foxy Brown (Chapter One: Greatest Hits, 2002)
  - "Ain't No Playa (Fresh to Def Mix)" Featuring Foxy Brown ("Ain't No Playa," 1996)
  - "Ain't No Playa (Ganja Kru Mix)" Featuring Foxy Brown ("Ain't No Playa," 1996)
  - "Ain't No Playa (New York Street Mix)" Featuring Foxy Brown ("Ain't No Playa," 1996)
8. "Ain't No Love (In The Heart Of A City)" (The Blueprint, 2001)
9. "All Around the World" Featuring LaToiya Williams (The Blueprint 2: The Gift & The Curse, 2002)
10. "All I Need" (The Blueprint, 2001)
11. "Allure" (The Black Album, 2003)
12. "(Always Be My) Sunshine" Featuring Foxy Brown & Babyface (In My Lifetime, Vol. 1, 1997)
13. "Already Home" Featuring Kid Cudi (The Blueprint 3, 2009)
14. "American Dreamin'" (American Gangster, 2007)
15. "American Gangster" (American Gangster, 2007)
16. "Anything" (The Truth, 1999)
  - "Anything (Mr. Drunk Mix)" (Vol. 3... Life and Times of S. Carter (Japan Version), 1999)
17. "Anything" Featuring Usher & Pharrell (Kingdom Come, 2006)
18. "As One" Featuring Memphis Bleek, Freeway, Young Gunz, Beanie Sigel, Peedi Crakk, Omillio Sparks & Rell (The Blueprint 2: The Gift & The Curse, 2002)
19. "A Star is Born" Featuring J. Cole (The Blueprint 3, 2009)

== B ==
1. "Beach Chair" Featuring Chris Martin (Kingdom Come, 2006)
2. "Big Chips" with R. Kelly (Unfinished Business, 2004)
3. "Big Pimpin'" Featuring UGK (Vol. 3... Life and Times of S. Carter, 1999)
  - "Big Pimpin'" Featuring Jaguar Wright (Jay-Z: Unplugged, 2001)
  - "Big Pimpin'/Papercut" with Linkin Park (Collision Course, 2004)
4. "Bitches & Sisters" (The Blueprint 2: The Gift & The Curse, 2002)
5. "BK Anthem" Featuring MC Lyte (2008)
6. "Blue Magic" (American Gangster, 2007)
7. "Blueprint (Momma Loves Me)" (The Blueprint, 2001)
8. "Blueprint²" (The Blueprint 2: The Gift & The Curse, 2002)
9. "Break Up (That's All We Do)" with R. Kelly (Unfinished Business, 2004)
10. "Break Up to Make Up" with R. Kelly (The Best of Both Worlds, 2002)
11. "Breathe Easy (Lyrical Exercise)" (The Blueprint, 2001)
12. "Bring It On" Featuring Big Jaz & Sauce Money (Reasonable Doubt, 1996)
13. "Brooklyn's Finest" Featuring The Notorious B.I.G. (Reasonable Doubt, 1996)
14. "Brooklyn Go Hard" Featuring Santigold (Notorious Soundtrack, 2009)

== C ==
1. "Can I Get A..." Featuring Amil & Ja Rule (Vol. 2... Hard Knock Life/Def Jam's Rush Hour Soundtrack, 1998)
  - "Can I Get A..." Featuring Jaguar Wright (Jay-Z: Unplugged, 2001)
2. "Can I Live" (Reasonable Doubt, 1996)
  - "Can I Live II" Featuring Memphis Bleek (Reasonable Doubt (Re-Release), 1998)
3. "Can't Knock the Hustle" Featuring Mary J. Blige (Reasonable Doubt, 1996)
  - "Can't Knock the Hustle (Desired State Remix)" Featuring Mary J. Blige ("Ain't No Playa," 1996)
  - "Can't Knock the Hustle (Fool's Paradise Remix)" Featuring Meli'sa Morgan (Reasonable Doubt (UK Version), 1996)
  - "Can't Knock the Hustle / Family Affair" Featuring Jaguar Wright and Mary J. Blige (Jay-Z: Unplugged, 2001)
4. "Cashmere Thoughts" (Reasonable Doubt, 1996)
5. "Celebration" Featuring Memphis Bleek, Sauce Money & Wais (Streets Is Watching Soundtrack, 1998)
6. "Change Clothes" (The Black Album, 2003)
7. "Change the Game" Featuring Beanie Sigel & Memphis Bleek (The Dynasty: Roc La Familia, 2000)
  - "Change the Game (Remix)" Featuring Tha Dogg Pound, Beanie Sigel & Memphis Bleek (2002, 2001)
8. "Come and Get Me" (Vol. 3... Life and Times of S. Carter, 1999)
9. "Coming of Age" Featuring Memphis Bleek (Reasonable Doubt, 1996)
10. "Coming of Age (Da Sequel)" Featuring Memphis Bleek (Vol. 2... Hard Knock Life, 1998)

== D ==
1. "D.O.A. (Death of Auto-Tune)" (The Blueprint 3, 2009)
2. "D'evils" (Reasonable Doubt, 1996)
3. "Dead Presidents" ("Dead Presidents", 1995)
4. "Dead Presidents II" (Reasonable Doubt, 1996)
5. "December 4th" (The Black Album, 2003)
6. "Diamond Is Forever" (The Blueprint 2: The Gift & The Curse, 2002)
7. "Dig a Hole" Featuring Sterling Simms (Kingdom Come, 2006)
8. "Dirt off Your Shoulder" (The Black Album, 2003)
  - "Dirt off Your Shoulder/Lying from You" with Linkin Park (Collision Course, 2004)
9. "Do It Again (Put Ya Hands Up)" feat. Amil & Beanie Sigel (Vol. 3... Life and Times of S. Carter, 1999)
10. "Do U Wanna Ride" Featuring John Legend (Kingdom Come, 2006)
11. "Don't Let Me Die" with R. Kelly (Unfinished Business, 2004)
12. "Don't You Know" (Paid in Full Soundtrack, 2002)
13. "Dope Man" (Vol. 3... Life and Times of S. Carter, 1999)
14. "DP3"

== E ==
1. "Empire State of Mind" Featuring Alicia Keys (The Blueprint 3, 2009)
2. "Encore" (The Black Album, 2003)
  - "Numb/Encore" with Linkin Park (Collision Course, 2004)
3. "Excuse Me Miss" (The Blueprint 2: The Gift & The Curse, 2002)

== F ==
1. "Face Off" Featuring Sauce Money (In My Lifetime, Vol. 1, 1997)
2. "Fallin'" Featuring Bilal (American Gangster, 2007)
3. "Feelin' It" Featuring Mecca (Reasonable Doubt, 1996)
4. "Feelin' You In Stereo" with R. Kelly (Unfinished Business, 2004)
5. "Friend or Foe" (Reasonable Doubt, 1996)
6. "Friend or Foe '98" (In My Lifetime, Vol. 1, 1997)
7. "From Marcy to Hollywood" Featuring Memphis Bleek & Sauce Money (The Players Club soundtrack, 1998)
8. "For My Thugs" Featuring Beanie Sigel & Memphis Bleek (Funkmaster Flex & Big Kap – The Tunnel)", 1999)
9. "Fuck All Nite" (The Blueprint 2: The Gift & The Curse, 2002)
10. "FuckUpThisWorld" (F.U.T.W.) (Magna Carta... Holy Grail, 2013)
11. "FuckWithMeYouKnowIGotIt" Featuring Rick Ross (Magna Carta... Holy Grail, 2013)

== G ==
1. "The Game Iz Mine" (2003)
2. "Get This Money" with R. Kelly (The Best of Both Worlds, 2002)
3. "Get Off My Shit" (2002)
4. "Get Your Mind Right Mami" Featuring Memphis Bleek & Snoop Dogg (The Dynasty: Roc La Familia, 2000)
5. "Girl's Best Friend" (Vol. 3... Life and Times of S. Carter, Blue Streak: The Album, 1999)
6. "Girls, Girls, Girls" (The Blueprint, 2001)
  - "Girls, Girls, Girls" Featuring Jaguar Wright (Jay-Z: Unplugged, 2001)
7. "Girls, Girls, Girls (Part II)" (The Blueprint, 2001)
8. "Glory" featuring Blue Ivy Carter (2012)
9. "Green Light" with R. Kelly Featuring Beanie Sigel (The Best of Both Worlds, 2002)
10. "Guilty Until Proven Innocent" Featuring R. Kelly (The Dynasty: Roc La Familia, 2000)
11. "Guns and Roses" Featuring Lenny Kravitz (The Blueprint 2: The Gift & The Curse, 2002)

== H ==
1. "Hard Knock Life (Ghetto Anthem)" (Vol. 2... Hard Knock Life, 1998)
  - "Hard Knock Life (The Ghetto Anthem)" Featuring Jaguar Wright (Jay-Z: Unplugged, 2001)
2. "Hate" Featuring Kanye West (The Blueprint 3, 2009)
3. "Heart of the City (Ain't No Love)" (The Blueprint, 2001)
  - "Heart of the City (Ain't No Love)" Featuring Jaguar Wright (Jay-Z: Unplugged, 2001)
4. "Hello Brooklyn 2.0" Featuring Lil Wayne (American Gangster, 2007)
5. "Hey Papi" Featuring Amil & Memphis Bleek (Nutty Professor II: The Klumps Soundtrack, 2000)
6. "H.O.V.A. (Super Hero Music)" (The Desert Storm Mixtape: Blok Party, Vol. 1, 2003)
7. "Hola' Hovito" (The Blueprint, 2001)
8. "Hollywood" Featuring Beyoncé (Kingdom Come, 2006)
9. "Honey" with R. Kelly (The Best of Both Worlds, 2002)
10. "Hova Interlude" (Vol. 3... Life and Times of S. Carter (Japan Version), 1999)
11. "Hova Song (Intro)" (Vol. 3... Life and Times of S. Carter, 1999)
12. "Hova Song (Outro)" (Vol. 3... Life and Times of S. Carter, 1999)
13. "Hovi Baby" (The Blueprint 2: The Gift & The Curse, 2002)
  - "Hovi Baby (Remix)" (2003)
14. "History" (Music Inspired by More Than a Game, 2009)

== I ==
1. "I Can't Get Wid That" ("In My Lifetime," 1995)
  - "I Can't Get Wid That (Remix)" Featuring Jaz-O and Sauce Money ("In My Lifetime," 1995)
2. "I Did It My Way" (The Blueprint 2: The Gift & The Curse, 2002)
3. "I Just Wanna Love U (Give It 2 Me)" (The Dynasty: Roc La Familia, 2000)
  - "I Just Wanna Love U (Give It to Me)" Featuring Jaguar Wright & Pharrell (Jay-Z: Unplugged, 2001)
4. "I Know" (American Gansgter, 2007)
5. "I Know What Girls Like" Featuring Lil' Kim and Puff Daddy (In My Lifetime, Vol. 1, 1997)
  - "I Know What Girls Like (Fly Girly Dub)" Featuring Lil' Kim and Puff Daddy (Chapter One: Greatest Hits, 2002)
6. "I Made It" (Kingdom Come, 2006)
7. "If I Should Die" Featuring Da Ranjahz (Vol. 2... Hard Knock Life, 1998)
8. "Ignorant Shit" Featuring Beanie Sigel (American Gangster, 2007)
9. "Imaginary Player" (In My Lifetime, Vol. 1, 1997)
10. "In My Lifetime" ("In My Lifetime," 1995)
  - "In My Lifetime (Remix)" (Bullet Soundtrack, 1996)
11. "In My Lifetime (Remix)" (Streets Is Watching Soundtrack, 1998)
12. "Interlude" (The Black Album, 2003)
13. "Intro" (American Gangster, 2007)
14. "Intro" (The Dynasty: Roc La Familia, 2000)
15. "Intro / A Million and One Questions / Rhyme No More" (In My Lifetime, Vol. 1, 1997)
  - "A Million and One Questions (DJ Premiere Remix)" ("The City Is Mine," 1998)
16. "Intro – Hand It Down" Featuring Memphis Bleek (Vol. 2... Hard Knock Life, 1998)
17. "Is That Yo Bitch?" Featuring Missy Elliott & Twista (Vol. 3... Life and Times of S. Carter (Japan Version), 1999)
18. "It Ain't Personal" with R. Kelly (The Best of Both Worlds, 2002)
19. "It's Alright" Featuring Memphis Bleek (Vol. 2... Hard Knock Life, 1998)
20. "It's Hot (Some Like It Hot)" (Vol. 3... Life and Times of S. Carter, 1999)
21. "It's Like That" Featuring Kid Capri (Vol. 2... Hard Knock Life, 1998)
22. "Izzo (H.O.V.A.)" (The Blueprint, 2001)
  - "Izzo (H.O.V.A.)" Featuring Jaguar Wright (Jay-Z: Unplugged, 2001)
  - "Izzo/In the End" with Linkin Park (Collision Course, 2004)

== J ==
1. "Jigga My Nigga" (Vol. 3: Life and Times of S. Carter, 1999)
2. "Jigga That Nigga" (The Blueprint, 2001)
3. "Jigga What, Jigga Who" (Vol. 2: Hard Knock Life, 1998)
4. "Jockin' JAY-Z" (The Blueprint 3, 2008)

== K ==
1. "Kingdom Come" (Kingdom Come, 2006)

== L ==
1. "La-La-La (Excuse Me Miss Again)" (The S. Carter Collection, The Blueprint 2.1, Bad Boys II Soundtrack, 2003)
2. "Lift Off" with Kanye West Featuring Beyoncé (Watch the Throne, 2011)
3. "Lost One" Featuring Chrisette Michele (Kingdom Come, 2006)
4. "Lucifer" (The Black Album, 2003)
5. "Lucky Me" (In My Lifetime, Vol. 1, 1997)

== M ==
1. "Meet the Parents" (The Blueprint 2: The Gift & The Curse, 2002)
2. "Minority Report" Featuring Ne-Yo (Kingdom Come, 2006)
3. "Mo' Money" with R. Kelly; Featuring Twista (Unfinished Business, 2004)
4. "Moment of Clarity" (The Black Album, 2003)
5. "Money Ain't a Thang" Featuring Jermaine Dupri (Vol. 2... Hard Knock Life, 1998)
6. "Money, Cash, Hoes" Featuring DMX (Vol. 2... Hard Knock Life, 1998)
  - "More Money, More Cash, More Hoes" Featuring Beanie Sigel, DMX & Memphis Bleek (The Corruptor: The Soundtrack, 1999)
7. "Murdergram" Featuring DMX and Ja Rule (Streets Is Watching Soundtrack, 1998)
8. "My 1st Song" (The Black Album, 2003)

== N ==
1. "Naked" with R. Kelly (The Best of Both Worlds, 2002)
2. "Never Change" (The Blueprint, 2001)
3. "Nigga Please" Featuring Young Chris (The Blueprint 2: The Gift & The Curse, 2002)
4. "Nigga What, Nigga Who (Originator 99)" Featuring Big Jaz from the album (Vol. 2... Hard Knock Life, 1998)
  - "Jigga What, Jigga Who" Featuring Jaguar Wright (Jay-Z: Unplugged, 2001)
  - "Jigga What/Faint" with Linkin Park (Collision Course, 2004)
5. "Niggas In Paris" with Kanye West (Watch the Throne, 2011)
6. "No Hook" (American Gangster, 2007)
7. "NYMP" (Vol. 3... Life and Times of S. Carter, 1999)
8. "No Church in the Wild" with Kanye West; Featuring Frank Ocean and The-Dream (Watch the Throne, 2011)

== O ==
1. "Oceans" Featuring Frank Ocean (Magna Carta... Holy Grail, 2013)
2. "Off That" Featuring Drake (The Blueprint 3, 2009)
3. "Oh My God" (Kingdom Come, 2006)
4. "Only a Customer" (Streets Is Watching Soundtrack, 1998)
5. "On to the Next One" Featuring Swizz Beatz (The Blueprint 3, 2009)
6. "Otis" with Kanye West (Watch the Throne, 2011)
7. "Open Letter" Featuring Swizz Beatz (Magna Carta... Holy Grail, 2013)

== P ==
1. "Paper Chase" Featuring Foxy Brown (Vol. 2... Hard Knock Life, 1998)
2. "Part II (On the Run)" Featuring Beyoncé (Magna Carta Holy Grail, 2013)
3. "People Talking" (2001)
4. "Picasso Baby" (Magna Carta Holy Grail, 2013)
5. "Politics as Usual" (Reasonable Doubt, 1996)
6. "Pop 4 Roc" Featuring Amil, Beanie Sigel & Memphis Bleek (Vol. 3... Life and Times of S. Carter, 1999)
7. "Poppin' Tags" Featuring Big Boi, Killer Mike & Twista (The Blueprint 2: The Gift & The Curse, 2002)
8. "Pray" (American Gangster, 2007)
9. "Pretty Girls" with R. Kelly (Unfinished Business, 2004)
10. "Primetime" with Kanye West ("Watch the Throne", 2011)
11. "Public Service Announcement (Interlude)" (The Black Album, 2003)
12. "Pussy" with R. Kelly; Featuring Devin the Dude (The Best of Both Worlds, 2002)

== R ==
1. "Rap Game / Crack Game" (In My Lifetime, Vol. 1, 1997)
2. "Real as It Gets" Featuring Young Jeezy (The Blueprint 3, 2009)
3. "Real Niggaz" Featuring Too Short (In My Lifetime, Vol. 1, 1997)
4. "Regrets" (Reasonable Doubt, 1996)
5. "Reminder" (The Blueprint 3, 2009)
6. "Renegade" Featuring Eminem (The Blueprint, 2001)
7. "Reservoir Dogs" Featuring Beanie Sigel, Sauce Money & The Lox (Vol. 2... Hard Knock Life, 1998)
8. "Ride or Die" (Vol. 2... Hard Knock Life, 1998)
9. "Roc Army" Featuring Cam'ron & State Property (Paid in Full Soundtrack, 2002)
10. "Roc Boys (And the Winner Is)..." (American Gangster, 2007)
11. "Run This Town" Featuring Rihanna & Kanye West (The Blueprint 3, 2009)

== S ==
1. "S. Carter" Featuring Amil (Vol. 3... Life and Times of S. Carter, 1999)
2. "Say Hello" (American Gangster, 2007)
3. "Shake Ya Body" with R. Kelly; Featuring Lil' Kim (The Best of Both Worlds, 2002)
4. "She's Coming Home With Me" with R. Kelly (Unfinished Business, 2004)
5. "Shorty" with R. Kelly (The Best of Both Worlds, 2002)
6. "Show Me What You Got" (Kingdom Come, 2006)
7. "Show You How" (The Blueprint 2: The Gift & The Curse, 2002)
8. "Snoopy Track" Featuring Juvenile (Vol. 3... Life and Times of S. Carter, 1999)
9. "So Ambitious" (The Blueprint 3, 2009)
10. "So Ghetto" (Vol. 3... Life and Times of S. Carter, 1999)
11. "Some How Some Way" Featuring Beanie Sigel & Scarface (The Blueprint 2: The Gift & The Curse, 2002)
12. "Some People Hate" (The Blueprint 2: The Gift & The Curse, 2002)
13. "Somebody's Girl" with R. Kelly (The Best of Both Worlds, 2002)
14. "Song Cry" (The Blueprint, 2001)
  - "Song Cry" Featuring Jaguar Wright (Jay-Z: Unplugged, 2001)
15. "Soon You'll Understand" (The Dynasty: Roc La Familia, 2000)
16. "Squeeze 1st" (The Dynasty: Roc La Familia, 2000)
17. "Stick 2 the Script" Featuring Beanie Sigel (The Dynasty: Roc La Familia, 2000)
18. "Stop" (The S. Carter Collection, The Blueprint 2.1, 2003)
19. "Stop" with R. Kelly; Featuring Foxy Brown (Unfinished Business, 2004)
20. "Streets Is Talking" Featuring Beanie Sigel (The Dynasty: Roc La Familia, 2000)
21. "Streets Is Watching" (In My Lifetime, Vol. 1, 1997)
22. "Success" Featuring Nas (American Gangster, 2007)
23. "Sweet" (American Gangster, 2007)

== T ==
1. "Take You Home with Me a.k.a. Body" with R. Kelly (The Best of Both Worlds, 2002)
2. "Takeover" (The Blueprint, 2001)
  - "Takeover" featuring Jaguar Wright (Jay-Z: Unplugged, 2001)
3. "Thank You" (The Blueprint 3, 2009)
4. "The Best of Both Worlds" with R. Kelly (The Best of Both Worlds, 2002)
5. "The Bounce" Featuring Kanye West (The Blueprint 2: The Gift & The Curse, 2002)
6. "The City Is Mine" Featuring Blackstreet (In My Lifetime, Vol. 1, 1997)
7. "The Return" with R. Kelly (Unfinished Business, 2004)
  - The Return (Remix) with R. Kelly; Featuring Slick Rick and Doug E. Fresh (Unfinished Business, 2004)
8. "The Ruler's Back" (The Blueprint, 2001)
9. "The Streets" with R. Kelly (The Best of Both Worlds, 2002)
10. "The Watcher 2" Featuring Dr. Dre, Rakim, & Truth Hurts (The Blueprint 2: The Gift & The Curse, 2002)
11. "There's Been a Murder" (Vol. 3... Life and Times of S. Carter, 1999)
12. "The Prelude" (Kingdom Come, 2006)
13. "This Life Forever" (Black Gangster Original Soundtrack, 1999)
14. "Threat" (The Black Album, 2003)
15. "Things That U Do" Featuring Mariah Carey (Vol. 3... Life and Times of S. Carter, 1999)
16. "This Can't Be Life" Featuring Beanie Sigel & Scarface (The Dynasty: Roc La Familia, 2000)
17. "Tom Ford" (Magna Carta... Holy Grail, 2013)
18. "Trouble" (Kingdom Come, 2006)

== U ==
1. "U Don't Know" (The Blueprint, 2001)
2. "U Don't Know (Remix)" Featuring M.O.P. (The Blueprint 2: The Gift & The Curse, 2002)

== W ==
1. "Whole Place Shimmer" (The Blueprint 3, 2009)

== W ==
1. "Watch Me" Featuring Dr. Dre (Vol. 3... Life and Times of S. Carter, 1999)
2. "What More Can I Say" (The Black Album, 2003)
3. "What We Talkin' About" Featuring Luke Steele (The Blueprint 3, 2009)
4. "We Got Em Goin'" with R. Kelly; Featuring Memphis Bleek (Unfinished Business, 2004)
5. "Welcome To The Jungle" Jay-Z & Kanye West; Watch The Throne; 2011
6. "What They Gonna Do" Featuring Sean Paul (The Blueprint 2: The Gift & The Curse, 2002)
  - "What They Gonna Do, Pt. II" (The Blueprint 2: The Gift & The Curse, 2002)
7. "When The Money Goes" (2008)
8. "Where Have You Been" Featuring Beanie Sigel (The Dynasty: Roc La Familia, 2000)
9. "Where I'm From" (In My Lifetime, Vol. 1, 1997)
10. "Who Gon Stop Me" Jay-Z & Kanye West; Watch the Throne; 2011
11. "Why I Love You" Jay-Z & Kanye West Featuring Mr. Hudson Watch The Throne; 2011
12. "Wishing on a Star" Featuring Gwen Dickey (In My Lifetime, Vol. 1 (UK Version), 1997)
  - "Wishing on a Star (D'Influence Full Vocal Remix)" Featuring Gwen Dickey (In My Lifetime, Vol. 1 (UK Version), 1997)
  - "Wishing on a Star (D'Influence Remix)" Featuring Gwen Dickey (In My Lifetime, Vol. 1 (UK Version), 1997)
  - "Wishing on a Star (Trackmasters Remix)" Featuring Gwen Dickey (In My Lifetime, Vol. 1 (UK Version), 1997)
13. "Who You Wit" (Sprung (Music from and Inspired by the Motion Picture), 1997)
  - "Who You Wit II" (In My Lifetime, Vol. 1, 1997)

== Y ==
1. "Young Forever" Featuring Mr. Hudson (The Blueprint 3, 2009)
2. "You, Me, Him and Her" Featuring Amil, Beanie Sigel & Memphis Bleek (The Dynasty: Roc La Familia, 2000)
3. "You Must Love Me" Featuring Kelly Price (In My Lifetime, Vol. 1, 1997)
4. "You're Welcome" Featuring Mary J. Blige & Swizz Beatz (2008)

== Guest appearances ==
List of guest appearances, with other performing artists, showing year released and album name
Title	Year	Other artist(s)	Album
"Hawaiian Sophie"	1989	Jaz-O, Jay-Z	Word To The Jaz
"The Originators"	1990	Jaz-O, Jay-Z	To Your Soul
"Show & Prove"	1994	Big Daddy Kane, Scoob Lover, Sauce Money, Shyheim, Jay-Z, Ol' Dirty Bastard	Daddy's Home
"Time to Build"	1995	Mic Geronimo, Ja Rule, DMX	The Natural
"No Love Lost"	1996	Shaquille O'Neal, Lord Tariq	You Can't Stop the Reign
"Big Momma Thang"	1996	Lil' Kim, Lil' Cease	Hard Core
"I'll Be"	1996	Foxy Brown, Jay-Z	I'll Be
"I Love the Dough"	1997	The Notorious B.I.G., Angela Winbush	Life After Death
"Young G's"	1997	Puff Daddy & the Family, The Notorious B.I.G.	No Way Out
"Cheat on You"	1997	Mase, Lil' Cease, 112	Harlem World
"Single Life"	1997	Mic Geronimo, Carl Thomas	Vendetta
"We Ride"	1998	R. Kelly, Cam'ron, N.O.R.E.	R.
"Lobster & Scrimp"	1998	Timbaland, Jay-Z	Tim's Bio: Life From Da Bassment
"Blackout"	1998	DMX, The LOX	Flesh of My Flesh, Blood of My Blood
"Gangsta Shit"	1998	DJ Clue?, Ja Rule	The Professional
"Ha" (Remix)	1998	Juvenile	400 Degreez
"Bonnie & Clyde (Part II)"	1999	Foxy Brown	Chyna Doll
"What You Think of That"	1999	Memphis Bleek Jay-Z	Coming of Age
"Kill 'Em All"	1999	Ja Rule, Jay-Z	Venni Vetti Vecci
"It's Murda"	1999	Ja Rule, DMX, Jay-Z	Venni Vetti Vecci
"You Know What We Bout"	1999	Silkk the Shocker, Master P, Jay-Z	Made Man
"4 My Niggaz"	1999	Blake C, Lil' Cease, Mr. Bristal	The Wonderful World of Cease A Leo
"Do You Like It... Do You Want It..."	1999	Puff Daddy	Forever
"Heartbreaker"	1999	Mariah Carey, Jay-Z	Rainbow
"Mi Amor"	2000	Angie Martinez	Up Close and Personal
"Heard It All"	2000	Amil, Jay-Z	All Money Is Legal
"4 da Fam"	2000	Amil, Memphis Bleek, Beanie Sigel, Jay-Z	All Money Is Legal
"Get Out"	2000	Scarface	The Last of a Dying Breed
"Why We Die"	2000	Busta Rhymes, DMX	Anarchy
Unreleased	2001	Janet Jackson	All for You
"Bonafide"	2001	O.C.	Bon Appetit
"Think It's a Game"	2001	Beanie Sigel, Freeway, Lil Chris	The Reason
"One Minute Man"	2001	Missy Elliott, Jay-Z	Miss E... So Addictive
"Is That Your Chick (The Lost Verses)"	2001	Memphis Bleek, Twista, Missy Elliott, Jay-Z	The Understanding
"Fiesta (Remix)"	2001	R. Kelly, Boo & Gotti, Jay-Z	Fiesta
"Still Got Love for You	2001	Beanie Sigel, Rell	
"Lollipop"	2002	Snoop Dogg, Soopafly, Nate Dogg	Paid tha Cost to Be da Boss
"You Got Me"	2002	Mariah Carey, Freeway	Charmbracelet
"Welcome to New York City"	2002	Cam'ron, Jay-Z, Juelz Santana	Come Home with Me
"That's How You Like It"	2003	Beyoncé	Dangerously in Love
"Love & Life Intro"	2003	Mary J. Blige, P. Diddy	Love & Life
"Flip Flop Rock"	2003	OutKast, Killer Mike	Speakerboxxx/The Love Below
"You Got Me"	2003	Freeway, Mariah Carey	Philadelphia Freeway
"Never Let Me Down"	2004	Kanye West, J. Ivy	The College Dropout
"Never Take Me Alive"	2004	Young Gunz	Tough Luv
"Whatchu Want (The Commission)"	2005	The Notorious B.I.G.	Duets: The Final Chapter
"Can't Hide from Luv"	2005	Mary J. Blige	The Breakthrough
"Go Crazy" (Remix)	2005	Jeezy, Jay-Z	Let's Get It: Thug Motivation 101
"Diamonds from Sierra Leone" (Remix)	2005	Kanye West, Jay-Z	Late Registration
"Turn Off the Lights"	2006	—N/a	
"Pressure"	2006	Lupe Fiasco	Lupe Fiasco's Food & Liquor
"Hustlin'" (Remix)	2006	Rick Ross, Jay-Z, Jeezy	Port of Miami
"Black Republican"	2006	Nas	Hip Hop Is Dead
"Crazy"	2007	Ne-Yo	Because of You
"Brooklyn"	2007	Fabolous, Uncle Murda	From Nothin' to Somethin'
"Watch What You Say to Me"	2007	T.I.	T.I. vs. T.I.P.
"Gutted"	2007	Beanie Sigel	The Solution
"Maybach Music"	2008	Rick Ross	Trilla
"Best Thing"	2008	Usher	Here I Stand
"Lost+"	2008	Coldplay	Prospekt's March
"I Do It for Hip-Hop"	2008	Ludacris, Nas	Theater of the Mind
"Money Goes, Honey Stay" (When the Money Goes Remix)	2009	Fabolous	Loso's Way
"Light Up"	2010	Drake	Thank Me Later
"XXXO" (Remix)	2010	M.I.A.	XXXO: The Remixes
"So Appalled"	2010	Kanye West, Pusha T, Cyhi the Prynce, Swizz Beatz, RZA	My Beautiful Dark Twisted Fantasy
"Free Mason"	2010	Rick Ross, John Legend	Teflon Don
"Syllables"	2010	Eminem, Dr. Dre, Cashis, 50 Cent, Stat Quo	—N/a
"Boongie Drop"	2011	Lenny Kravitz	Black and White America
"Lay Up" (Remix)	2012	Meek Mill, Rick Ross, Trey Songz	—N/a
"Bitch, Don't Kill My Vibe" (Remix)	2013	Kendrick Lamar	—N/a
"High Art"	2013	The-Dream	IV Play
"Top Off"	2019	DJ Khaled, Beyoncé, Future	Father of Asahd
"Sorry Not Sorry"	2021	DJ Khaled, Nas, James Fauntleroy, Harmonies by The Hive	Khaled Khaled
"Love All"	2021	Drake	Certified Lover Boy
"Neck & Wrist"	2022	Pusha T, Pharrell Williams	It's Almost Dry
"God Did"	2022	DJ Khaled, Rick Ross, Lil Wayne, John Legend, Fridayy	God Did
