= Streets Is Watching =

Streets Is Watching may refer to:

- Streets Is Watching (soundtrack)
- Streets Is Watching (film)
- The fifth track from Jay-Z's second album In My Lifetime, Vol. 1
- The fourteenth track from the Young Money Entertainment collaboration studio album We Are Young Money
