= Jay-Z albums discography =

Jay-Z discography
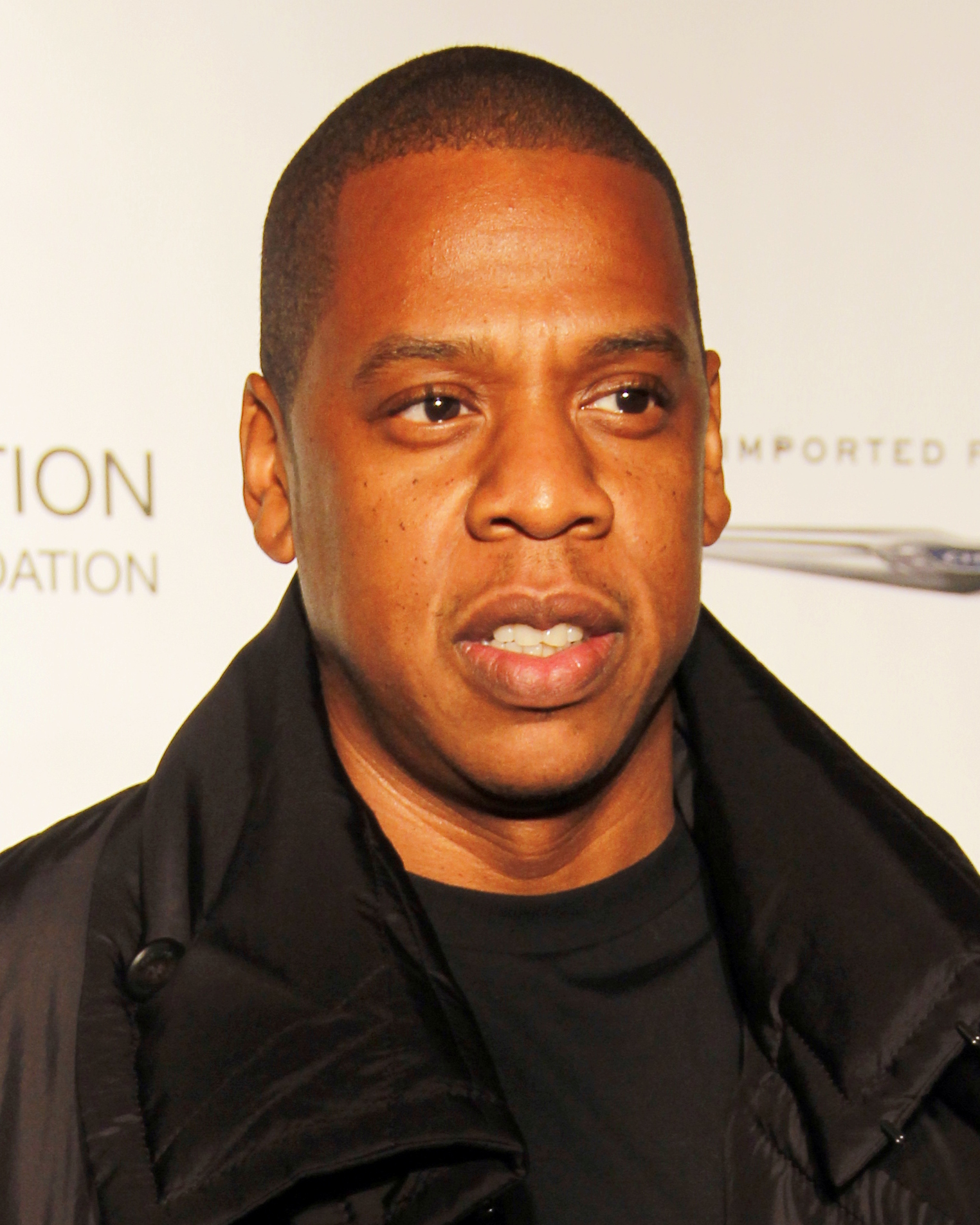
- Studio albums: 13
- Soundtrack albums: 1
- Live albums: 2
- Compilation albums: 1
- Collaborative albums: 5
- Mixtapes: 2

American rapper Jay-Z has released thirteen studio albums, five collaboration albums, two live albums, one compilation album, one soundtrack album, two mixtapes, 115 singles (including 45 as a featured artist), nine promotional singles, and 82 music videos. As of December 2014, Jay-Z sold 29,179,000 studio albums in the United States.

Jay-Z began his music career in the 1980s, building a reputation as a fledgling rapper in his hometown of Brooklyn, and collaborating with his mentor and fellow rapper Jaz-O. Jay-Z later founded Roc-A-Fella Records with close friends Damon Dash and Kareem "Biggs" Burke, and released his debut album, Reasonable Doubt (1996). The album peaked at number 23 on the US Billboard 200 and has since been recognized as a seminal work of the hip hop genre. Its singles includes "Dead Presidents", "Ain't No Nigga", and "Can't Knock the Hustle", all of which reached the top ten on the Billboard Hot Rap Songs chart. His second album, In My Lifetime, Vol. 1 (1997), saw Jay-Z collaborating with producers such as Sean "Puff Daddy" Combs and Teddy Riley, and peaked at number three on the Billboard 200 and earned a platinum certification from the Recording Industry Association of America (RIAA). His third album, Vol. 2... Hard Knock Life (1998), and became his first number-one album in the United States. The album featured the international hits such as "Can I Get A..." and "Hard Knock Life (Ghetto Anthem)", which both reached top twenty of the Billboard Hot 100. Vol. 2... Hard Knock Life was certified five times platinum by the RIAA and won the Grammy Award for Best Rap Album in 1999. Two more chart-topping albums–Vol. 3... Life and Times of S. Carter (1999) and The Dynasty: Roc La Familia (2000)–followed with both of these two albums includes hit singles such as "Big Pimpin'" and "I Just Wanna Love U (Give It 2 Me)", and the latter record features several guest appearances from artists signed to Roc-A-Fella.

His sixth album, The Blueprint (2001), topped the Billboard 200, and produced Jay-Z's first Billboard Hot 100 top ten single, "Izzo (H.O.V.A.)". The Blueprint was critically reviewed as his best album, while two other records–being his first collaborative album, The Best of Both Worlds (with American R&B singer R. Kelly), and his seventh album, The Blueprint 2: The Gift & The Curse (2002)–were both released the following year. The latter album peaked at number one on the Billboard 200 and featured the top ten singles "'03 Bonnie & Clyde" and "Excuse Me Miss". His eighth album, The Black Album (2003), was intended by Jay-Z to be his final studio album and features his impending retirement as a recurring theme. The album performed well commercially and was later certified 3x Multi-Platinum by the RIAA.

Following a period of dormancy, Jay-Z became president of Def Jam Recordings in December 2004 and resumed his rap career two years later with the release of Kingdom Come (2006), which peaked at number one on the Billboard 200 and was certified 2x Multi-Platinum by the RIAA. The concept album, American Gangster (2007), and continued his streak of number-one albums in the United States. With the release of The Blueprint 3 (2009), Jay-Z surpassed Elvis Presley as the solo artist with the most number-one albums on the Billboard 200. The album included the international hits such as "Run This Town", "Empire State of Mind" and "Young Forever". His fourth collaborative album, Watch the Throne (with American rapper Kanye West), followed in August 2011, and became Jay-Z's eleventh number-one album in the United States. His twelfth album, Magna Carta Holy Grail (2013), was a great commercial success, topping the Billboard 200 and having the second-biggest sales week for 2013 at the time of its release.

== Studio albums ==
List of studio albums, with selected chart positions, sales figures and certifications
Title	Album details	Peak chart positions										Sales	Certifications
Title	Album details	US	US R&B	CAN	FRA	GER	NLD	NOR	SWE	SWI	UK	Sales	Certifications
Reasonable Doubt	Released: June 25, 1996 (US); Label: Roc-A-Fella, Priority; Formats: CD, LP, cassette, digital download	23	3	—	—	—	—	—	—	—	140	US: 1,514,000	RIAA: Platinum; BPI: Gold
In My Lifetime, Vol. 1	Released: November 4, 1997 (US); Label: Roc-A-Fella, Def Jam; Formats: CD, LP, cassette, digital download	3	2	36	—	—	—	—	—	—	78	US: 1,412,000	RIAA: Platinum; BPI: Silver
Vol. 2... Hard Knock Life	Released: September 29, 1998 (US); Label: Roc-A-Fella, Def Jam; Formats: CD, LP, cassette, digital download	1	1	13	—	76	—	—	34	49	109	US: 5,400,000	RIAA: 6× Platinum; BPI: Gold; MC: Platinum
Vol. 3... Life and Times of S. Carter	Released: December 28, 1999 (US); Label: Roc-A-Fella, Def Jam; Formats: CD, LP, cassette, digital download	1	1	8	—	—	—	—	—	75	155	US: 3,093,000	RIAA: 3× Platinum; BPI: Silver; MC: Gold
The Dynasty: Roc La Familia	Released: October 31, 2000 (US); Label: Roc-A-Fella, Def Jam; Formats: CD, LP, cassette, digital download	1	1	5	—	98	—	—	—	89	86	US: 2,521,000	RIAA: 2× Platinum; BPI: Silver
The Blueprint	Released: September 11, 2001 (US); Label: Roc-A-Fella, Def Jam; Formats: CD, LP, cassette, digital download	1	1	3	73	55	51	36	30	59	30	US: 2,711,000; UK: 212,000	RIAA: 3× Platinum; BPI: Gold; MC: Platinum
The Blueprint 2: The Gift & The Curse	Released: November 12, 2002 (US); Label: Roc-A-Fella, Def Jam; Formats: CD, LP, cassette, digital download	1	1	8	79	61	66	—	—	52	23	US: 2,117,000	RIAA: 3× Platinum; BPI: Gold; MC: 2× Platinum
The Black Album	Released: November 14, 2003 (US); Label: Roc-A-Fella, Def Jam; Formats: CD, LP, digital download	1	1	12	66	47	66	18	41	29	34	US: 3,516,000	RIAA: 4× Platinum; BPI: Platinum; MC: Platinum
Kingdom Come	Released: November 21, 2006 (US); Label: Roc-A-Fella, Def Jam; Formats: CD, LP, digital download	1	1	6	79	76	71	—	45	17	35	US: 1,510,000	RIAA: 2× Platinum; BPI: Gold; MC: Platinum
American Gangster	Released: November 6, 2007 (US); Label: Roc-A-Fella, Def Jam; Formats: CD, LP, digital download	1	1	3	58	99	64	29	—	17	30	US: 1,131,000	RIAA: Platinum; BPI: Silver; MC: Gold
The Blueprint 3	Released: September 8, 2009 (US); Label: Roc Nation, Atlantic; Formats: CD, LP, digital download	1	1	1	20	22	12	15	44	12	4	US: 2,000,000	RIAA: 2× Platinum; ARIA: Gold; BPI: Platinum; MC: Platinum; SNEP: Gold
Magna Carta Holy Grail	Released: July 9, 2013 (various) (Note: Magna Carta Holy Grail was released on July 4, 2013 worldwide to Samsung mobile users through a special mobile app.); Label: Roc Nation, Roc-A-Fella; Formats: CD, LP, digital download	1	1	1	12	9	7	2	8	1	1	US: 1,130,000	RIAA: 3× Platinum; BPI: Gold; MC: Platinum
4:44	Released: June 30, 2017; Label: Roc Nation; Format: CD, cassette, digital download	1	1	1	43	15	11	11	16	5	3	US: 399,000	RIAA: 2× Platinum; BPI: Silver

== Collaborative albums ==
List of collaborative albums, with selected chart positions, sales figures and certifications
Title	Album details	Peak chart positions										Sales	Certifications
Title	Album details	US	US R&B	CAN	FRA	GER	NLD	NOR	SWE	SWI	UK	Sales	Certifications
The Best of Both Worlds (with R. Kelly)	Released: March 19, 2002 (US); Label: Roc-A-Fella, Def Jam, Jive; Formats: CD, LP, cassette	2	1	19	20	22	12	—	42	18	37		RIAA: Platinum
Unfinished Business (with R. Kelly)	Released: October 26, 2004 (US); Label: Roc-A-Fella, Def Jam, Jive; Formats: CD, LP, digital download	1	1	—	68	77	60	—	—	65	61		RIAA: Platinum
Collision Course (with Linkin Park)	Released: November 30, 2004 (US); Label: Roc-A-Fella, Def Jam, Machine Shop, Warner; Formats: CD, LP, digital download	1	3	6	20	5	9	1	9	2	15		RIAA: 2× Platinum; ARIA: Platinum; BPI: Platinum; BVMI: Platinum; IFPI SWI: Platinum; MC: 2× Platinum
Watch the Throne (with Kanye West)	Released: August 8, 2011 (US); Label: Roc Nation, Roc-A-Fella; Formats: CD, LP, digital download	1	1	1	10	2	3	1	27	1	3	US: 1,573,000; WW: 2,000,000	RIAA: 5× Platinum; ARIA: Platinum; BPI: Platinum; MC: Platinum
Everything Is Love (with Beyoncé as The Carters)	Released: June 16, 2018 (US); Label: Roc Nation, Parkwood; Formats: CD, digital download	2	1	4	44	23	4	11	14	5	5	US: 70,000	RIAA: Gold; BPI: Silver; MC: Gold

== Compilation albums ==
List of compilation albums, with selected chart positions and certifications
Title	Album details	Peak chart positions								Certifications
Title	Album details	US	US R&B	AUS	CAN	GER	NOR	SWI	UK	Certifications
The Hits Collection, Volume One	Released: November 22, 2010 (US); Label: Roc Nation, Def Jam; Formats: CD, LP, digital download	43	11	83	35	89	16	98	20	BPI: Platinum

== Soundtrack albums ==
List of soundtrack album, with selected chart positions
Title	Album details	Peak chart positions	
Title	Album details	US	US R&B
Streets Is Watching	Released: May 5, 1998 (US); Label: Roc-A-Fella, Def Jam; Formats: CD, LP, digital download	27	3

== Live albums ==
List of live albums, with selected chart positions
Title	Album details	Peak chart positions			Certifications
Title	Album details	US	US R&B	UK	Certifications
Jay-Z: Unplugged	Released: December 18, 2001 (US); Label: Roc-A-Fella, Def Jam; Formats: CD, LP, digital download	31	8	153	RIAA: Gold; BPI: Silver
Live in Brooklyn	Released: October 9, 2012 (US); Label: Roc Nation, Def Jam; Formats: Digital download	35	6	—	
"—" denotes a recording that did not chart or was not released in that territory.

== Mixtapes ==
List of mixtape albums
Title	Album details
S. Carter Collection	Released: April 18, 2003 (US); Label: Roc-A-Fella, Def Jam; Formats: CD
S. Carter: The Re-Mix	Released: 2004; Label: Roc-A-Fella, Def Jam, Reebok; Formats: CD

== See also ==
- Jay-Z singles discography
- The Carters
