= It's Alright (Jay-Z and Memphis Bleek song) =

Single by Memphis Bleek and Jay-Z

from the album Streets Is Watching and Vol. 2... Hard Knock Life
- B-side: "The Doe"
- Released: April 21, 1998
- Recorded: 1997
- Genre: East Coast hip hop
- Length: 4:03
- Label: Roc-A-Fella; Def Jam
- Songwriter(s): Shawn Carter; Damon Dash; Imsomie Leeper; David Byrne; Brian Eno; Jerry Harrison; Tina Weymouth; Chris Frantz
- Producer(s): Damon Dash; Mahogany Music

Memphis Bleek singles chronology
"It's Alright" (1998)	"More Money, More Cash, More Hoes (Remix)" (1999)

Jay-Z singles chronology
"Wishing on a Star" (1998)	"It's Alright" (1998)	"Money Ain't a Thang" (1998)

"It's Alright" is the only single by Memphis Bleek and Jay-Z that was released from the Streets Is Watching soundtrack for the film of the same name. It was later featured as a bonus track on Jay-Z's third album, Vol. 2... Hard Knock Life. It is produced by Damon Dash and Mahogany Music, who sample "Once in a Lifetime" by Talking Heads and "The Hall of Mirrors" by Kraftwerk for the track's beat. Its B-side is "The Doe" by Diamonds in da Rough.

== Music video ==
The video was filmed in Cancun, Mexico. Cameo appearances are made by Damon Dash, Kareem "Biggs Burke, Ja Rule and DJ Clue.

== Formats and track listings ==
=== CD ===
1. "It's Alright" (Clean Version) (4:04)
2. "The Doe" (Clean Version) (4:14)

=== Vinyl ===
==== A-side ====
1. "It's Alright" (Clean Version)
2. "It's Alright" (Dirty Version)
3. "It's Alright" (TV track)

==== B-side ====
1. "The Doe" (Clean Version)
2. "The Doe" (Dirty Version)
3. "The Doe" (TV track)

== Charts ==
Chart (1998)	Peak position
US Billboard Hot 100	61
US Hot R&B/Hip-Hop Songs (Billboard)	32
US Hot Rap Songs (Billboard)	9

== See also ==
- List of songs recorded by Jay-Z
