= Greatest Hits: Chapter One =

Greatest Hits: Chapter One may refer to:

- The Hits – Chapter One, released as Greatest Hits: Chapter One internationally, the first greatest hits album by the Backstreet Boys
- Greatest Hits – Chapter One (Kelly Clarkson album), the first greatest hits album by Kelly Clarkson

== See also ==
- Chapter One: Greatest Hits, a greatest hits compilation album released in 2002 by rapper Jay-Z
