= D'Evils =

1996 song by Jay-Z

Song by Jay-Z

from the album Reasonable Doubt
- Released: June 25, 1996
- Recorded: 1995–1996
- Genre: East Coast hip hop; hardcore hip hop; mafioso rap
- Length: 3:31
- Label: Roc-A-Fella; Priority; S. Carter Enterprises; (streaming)
- Composer(s): Christopher Martin
- Lyricist(s): Shawn Carter
- Producer(s): DJ Premier

"D'Evils" is a song by American rapper Jay-Z from his debut studio album, Reasonable Doubt (1996). Produced by DJ Premier, "D'Evils" is a hardcore hip hop track that explores themes of money, power, corruption, and the moral consequences of street life. The song features extensive sampling from Allen Toussaint's 1965 song "Go Back Home" and has been widely referenced by other artists, becoming one of Jay-Z's most influential tracks.

"D'Evils" has been consistently ranked among Jay-Z's best songs by various publications and critics, with many considering it one of the standout tracks from his critically acclaimed debut album. The song's production, lyrical content, and cultural impact have cemented its status as a hip-hop classic, influencing numerous artists and remaining relevant decades after its release.

== Background and recording ==
"D'Evils" was recorded during sessions for Jay-Z's debut studio album, Reasonable Doubt, between 1995 and 1996. At the time, Jay-Z was still establishing himself in the competitive New York hip hop scene, having previously worked with Jaz-O and toured with Big Daddy Kane. The song was produced by DJ Premier, who had already established himself as one of hip-hop's most respected producers through his work with Gang Starr and other artists.

According to DJ Premier, he and Jay-Z were already friends from around 1989/1990 when Jay-Z was working with Jaz-O. Premier recalled that Jay-Z would often be seen with Big Daddy Kane, and they had discussed working together one day. When Jay-Z called Premier about "D'Evils," he had already conceived the entire concept for the record, including how he wanted the scratches to overlap.

Premier described the recording process as highly collaborative, with Jay-Z providing detailed direction for the production. "He called me and said, 'I have a concept for a record called D'Evils,' and he did the rhyme and even how he wanted the scratches to overlap over the phone. I said, 'Done deal!' I cooked the beat up. I'm very good at making music sound like your vision." Premier noted that Jay-Z never wrote his lyrics down during the recording process, instead memorizing four lines at a time and then going into the booth to record them.

In an interview with SPIN, Premier elaborated on the creative process:

Jay Z actually called me and recited the whole rhyme on the phone and gave me the concept of what he wanted it to be. So he already knew it was called 'D'Evils.' He told me what the song was about. He did the whole verse on the phone and he even told me which scratches to use. So everything was pretty much already mapped out. He said, 'I just need the track to sound like that atmosphere. I just need it to sound like the darkness of the lyrics.'

== Composition ==
=== Production and music ===
The production style reflects the East Coast hip hop aesthetic of the mid-1990s, with its emphasis on sample-based beats and dark, moody atmospheres. The main sample comes from Allen Toussaint's 1965 soul song "Go Back Home," which provides the haunting piano melody that serves as the foundation of the track.

The production also incorporates several other samples and interpolations:

- A sample from Snoop Dogg's "Murder Was The Case (Remix)," which in turn samples an earlier Snoop & Dre song "Lil Ghetto Boy"
- A vocal sample from Prodigy's verse in the LL Cool J song "I Shot Ya (Remix)" for the hook: "Illuminati want my mind, soul, and my body"
- Lyrical interpolations from Run-DMC's "Rock Box," The Notorious B.I.G.'s "Me & My Bitch," and the collaborative track "Young G's" featuring Puff Daddy, Jay-Z, Biggie, and Kelly Price

DJ Premier's signature scratching technique is prominently featured throughout the track, particularly over the hook sections. The producer noted that Jay-Z specifically requested "minor keys, almost sad" for the musical direction, which Premier then converted to his signature style.

=== Lyrics and themes ===
"D'Evils" explores themes of money, power, corruption, and the moral consequences of street life. The title is a play on words, pronounced as "Da Evils," suggesting the various evils that come with pursuing wealth and power through illicit means.

The song's lyrics paint a vivid portrait of the street life and the choices young black men face when deprived of legitimate opportunities. Key lines include "And the workings of the underworld, granted/Nine to five is how you survive, I ain't trying to survive/I'm trying to live it to the limit and love it a lot," which reflects the rejection of conventional employment in favor of more lucrative but dangerous pursuits.

According to Jay-Z's memoir Decoded, "D'Evils" carries similar themes to "Coming Of Age" from the same album, but with a more political and philosophical approach. While "Coming Of Age" focuses on the narrative of a rising drug dealer, "D'Evils" examines the broader implications of choosing a life of crime and the moral corruption that can result from the pursuit of money and power.

In Rolling Stone, the song was described as "clearly a work of fiction, one both inspired by Snoop Dogg's 1994 gem 'Murder Was the Case' – Snoop's 'Dear God, I wonder can you save me' forms part of producer DJ Premier's scratched-out chorus – as well as the Mafioso trend overtaking NYC rap." The publication noted that over "three increasingly bleak verses, Jay observes coldly how 'none of my friends speak,' then kidnaps the baby mother of his closest pal. He seduces her with sex and money and then, after extracting enough information to betray his homie, kills her in cold blood."

== Critical reception ==
"D'Evils" has received universal critical acclaim since its release and has been consistently ranked among Jay-Z's best songs by various publications and critics. The track has been included in numerous "best of" lists and is often cited as evidence of his early artistic vision and lyrical prowess.

In 2010, Rolling Stone included "D'Evils" in their list of Jay-Z's 50 Greatest Songs, describing it as one of his most powerful and politically charged tracks. The publication noted how the song "paints a picture of the moral consequences of street life that's both unflinching and deeply philosophical."

In 2019, Billboard included the track in their list of "Jay-Z's Top 25 Deep Cuts," with critic Brian Josephs describing it as "one of the most vivid depictions of the moral corruption that can result from pursuing money and power through illicit means."

American Songwriter ranked "D'Evils" as one of the top 5 Jay-Z songs of the 1990s, noting that it "is still beloved by Hov fans, as it was one of his first songs to set the foundation for his perspective on living a life of crime and drugs. Rapping about how he feels helpless and trapped in the cycle of vices, 'D'Evils' is one of the Brooklyn native's most impressive songwriting displays."

In Mic, the song was described as reflecting Jay-Z's ability to capture "life's infinite complexities into the most stark logic possible." The publication highlighted the line "9 to 5 is how you survive, I ain't trying to survive, I'm tryna live it to the limit and love it a lot" as "a more clear summation of the hustler lifestyle is hard to find."

The track has been sampled or interpolated in over 20 songs by various artists, including:

- J. Cole's "I Get Up" (2009)
- Mary J. Blige's "Round and Round" (1997)
- Lupe Fiasco's "Hurt Me Soul" (2006)
- Talib Kweli's "D'Evils 2008" (2008)
- KXNG Crooked's "Dear God" (2019)

== Cultural impact and legacy ==
"D'Evils" has had a significant cultural impact since its release, influencing numerous artists and becoming a touchstone for discussions about the moral implications of street life in hip-hop music.

=== Influence on other artists ===
The track has been widely sampled and referenced by other artists, demonstrating its lasting influence on hip-hop culture. Roc-A-Fella artist Memphis Bleek spoke about how "D'Evils" impacted him personally, stating: "My favorite song on the album had to be 'D'Evils.' Hands down. I stole a copy of the song, I liked it so much... But they didn't understand, I needed that record for my soul. I need it. You're talking to me."

Contemporary artists have also drawn inspiration from the track. TDE singer SiR titled one of his songs "D'Evils" as a tribute to Jay-Z, explaining: "The title of the song kind of came from the old Jay-Z song 'D'Evils.' I'm a huge Jay-Z fan so any opportunity I get to do something that he might see, I try to do it, you know what I mean?"

=== Critical legacy ===
According to critic Giovanni Martinez of Treblezine, "D'Evils" represents Jay-Z at his finest, combining compelling storytelling with sophisticated production to create a track that transcends its street-level subject matter. The song's examination of the moral consequences of pursuing wealth and power through illicit means continues to resonate with listeners decades after its release.

In 2025, Reasonable Doubt was inducted into the Grammy Hall of Fame, with Vibe noting that the album "has been lauded as one of Hip-Hop's greatest masterpieces."

=== Album context ===
"D'Evils" is considered one of the standout tracks on Reasonable Doubt, an album that StupidDOPE described as "a classic that changed hip-hop" and "Jay-Z's most lyrically dense body of work." The publication noted that "D'Evils" is "a lyrical exercise in moral conflict. It dives deep into how money, power, and distrust can erode even the strongest relationships. The eerie beat and Jay's storytelling paint a chilling picture of street loyalty gone wrong."

== Personnel ==
Credits are adapted from the liner notes of Reasonable Doubt.

- Jay-Z – vocals, songwriting
- DJ Premier – production, songwriting
- Allen Toussaint – songwriting (sampled material)

== Samples ==
"D'Evils" contains samples from the following songs:

- "Go Back Home" by Allen Toussaint (1965)
- "I Shot Ya (Remix)" by LL Cool J featuring Prodigy, Keith Murray, Fat Joe, and Foxy Brown (1995)
- "Murder Was the Case (Remix)" by Snoop Dogg (1994)
