= Veteranz Day =

Studio album by Big Daddy Kane
- Released: April 28, 1998
- Recorded: 1997–1998
- Studios: Studio 57 (New York, NY); Mighty Studios (New York, NY); Unique Recording Studios (New York, NY)
- Genre: East Coast hip hop
- Length: 61:02
- Labels: The Label; Blackheart; Mercury
- Producers: Big Daddy Kan]; DJ III; Easy Mo Bee; the L.G. Experience

Big Daddy Kane chronology
Daddy's Home (1994)	Veteranz Day (1998)

Singles from Veteranz Day
- 1. "Hold It Down" Released: 1998; 2. "Uncut, Pure" Released: 1998

Professional ratings
Review scores
Source	Rating
AllMusic	3/5 stars
RapReviews	7/10
Spin	6/10
The New Rolling Stone Album Guide	2.5/5 stars

Veteranz Day is the seventh studio album by American rapper Big Daddy Kane. It was released on April 28, 1998, via The Label/Blackheart Records. The recording sessions took place at Studio 57, Mighty Studios and Unique Recording Studios in New York. Production was handled by Easy Mo Bee, DJ Ill, L.G. and Big Daddy Kane himself. It features guest appearances from Rappin' Is Fundamental, Baldhead Buchanon, Felica Price, Kelly German, Mike Ransom, Philthy Dred, Shaneo Delano and Shaqueen.

The album peaked at number 62 on the Billboard Top R&B/Hip-Hop Albums in the United States.

== Background ==
The album came four years after his previous effort, 1994's Daddy's Home. Veteranz Day received little attention, commercially and critically, and was met with mixed reviews and few sales. It was his first and only album not to chart on the Billboard 200. Veteranz Day was the first and only album release for the small New York-based record label called the Label Records, which was founded by Frank Yandolino. Although it managed to earn a distribution deal with Mercury Records by way of Joan Jett's and Kenny Laguna's Blackheart Records, which was acting as a boutique distribution outlet for independent labels from 1998 to 2000, The Label folded almost shortly after the release of Veteranz Day. The album features the single "Uncut, Pure", which reached the top 10 on the Hot Rap Songs chart. There are two versions of "Uncut, Pure"—the original version produced by Easy Mo Bee, and a sequel version produced by Big Daddy Kane himself, the latter of which was released on the independently released 12-inch single and also featured as a bonus track on the CD and cassette versions of the album.

== Track listing ==
No.	Title	Writer(s)	Producer(s)	Length
1.	"Intro"			0:56
2.	"Uncut, Pure"	Big Daddy Kane	Easy Mo Bee	4:22
3.	"Entaprizin'" (featuring Philthy Dred and Shaneo Delano)	Big Daddy Kane	Big Daddy Kane	3:28
4.	"Girl Talk"			0:49
5.	"Change This Game Around" (featuring Felicia Price)	Big Daddy Kane	Big Daddy Kane	3:44
6.	"La-La-Land" (featuring Rappin' Is Fundamental)	Big Daddy Kane	Easy Mo Bee	4:37
7.	"Ole Tyme Bluez"			1:27
8.	"2 da Good Tymz" (featuring Mike Ransom)	Big Daddy Kane	DJ Ill	3:33
9.	"Fish Tandoori"			1:36
10.	"Terra N Ya Era"	Big Daddy Kane	Big Daddy Kane	3:50
11.	"Hold It Down" (featuring Kelly German)	Big Daddy Kane	Big Daddy Kane	4:07
12.	"Daddy's Theme"			0:52
13.	"Earth, Wind & Fire" (featuring Sha-Queen and A.B. Money)	Big Daddy Kane; Anthony Mosley; Satina Pearce	L.G.	4:26
14.	"Do U Really Know?"	Big Daddy Kane	Big Daddy Kane	4:51
15.	"Shame" (Prelude)			0:44
16.	"Shame!"	Big Daddy Kane	Big Daddy Kane	4:12
17.	"Last Night Episode"			0:49
18.	"Definitely"	Big Daddy Kane	Big Daddy Kane	3:37
19.	"Unda Presha" (featuring Baldhead Buchanon)	Big Daddy Kane	Big Daddy Kane	3:14
20.	"Outro"			1:42
21.	"Uncut, Pure" (Remix)	Big Daddy Kane	Big Daddy Kane	4:06
Total length:				1:01:02

Sample credits

- Track 3 contains a sample from the song "Violation" written by Alfonso J. Cervantes and William Michael Lewis.
- Track 8 contains an interpolation of "Here's to You" written by Randy Muller.
- Track 21 contains a sample from the song "The Breakdown" written by Eddie Floyd, Mack Rice and Rufus Thomas.

== Personnel ==
- Antonio "Big Daddy Kane" Hardy – songwriter (tracks: 2, 3, 5, 6, 8, 10, 11, 13, 14, 16, 18, 19, 21), vocals, keyboards (tracks: 5, 14), producer (tracks: 3, 5, 10, 11, 14, 16, 18, 19, 21), mixing (tracks: 3, 5, 8, 10, 11, 13, 14, 16, 18, 21)
- Philthy Dred – vocals (track 3)
- Shaneo Delano – vocals (track 3)
- Felica Price – vocals (track 5)
- Anthony "A.B. Money" Mosley – songwriter (track 13), vocals (tracks: 6, 13)
- Mike Ransom – vocals (track 8)
- Kelly German – vocals (track 11)
- Satina "Shaqueen" Pearce – songwriter & vocals (track 13)
- Baldhead Buchanon – vocals (track 19)
- Alan Cohen – bass guitar (track 8), music production supervision
- Eddie Walton – guitar & bass (track 11), keyboards (track 14)
- Sirmone Frink – keyboards (track 11)
- Larry Williams – chorus vocal arrangement (track 11)
- Osten "Easy Mo Bee" Harvey, Jr. – producer (tracks: 2, 6), mixing (tracks: 2, 6, 10, 19)
- Pete "DJ Ill" Ellis – producer (track 8)
- Patrick "The LG Experience" Harvey – producer & mixing (track 13)
- Eric Lynch – engineering (tracks: 2, 5, 6, 10, 11, 13, 18, 19), mixing (tracks: 11, 13, 18)
- Peter Jorge – engineering & mixing (tracks: 3, 8)
- Nat Foster – engineering & mixing (track 14)
- Michael "Wolfman" Reaves – engineering & mixing (track 16)
- Chris J. Moore – engineering & mixing (track 21)
- Gery Collins – digital editing
- Frank Yandolino – executive producer
- George DuBose – art direction, design, photography
- Spencer Drate – art direction, design
- Eve Cohen – music production supervision
- Jesko Schitthelm – music production consultant

== Charts ==
Chart (1998)	Peak position
US Top R&B/Hip-Hop Albums (Billboard)	62
