= Show & Prove =

1994 song

Single by Big Daddy Kane featuring Jay-Z, Ol' Dirty Bastard, Sauce Money, Shyheim & Scoob Lover

from the album Daddy's Home
- Released: August 13, 1994
- Recorded: 1994
- Genre: Boom bap; hardcore hip hop
- Length: 5:45
- Label: MCA
- Songwriters: Big Daddy Kane; Chris E. Martin; Scoob Lover; Jay-Z; Ol' Dirty Bastard; Sauce Money; Shyheim
- Producer: DJ Premier

Big Daddy Kane singles chronology
"Show & Prove" (1994)	"In My Lifetime" (1995)

Jay-Z singles chronology
"Can I Get Open" (1993)	"Show & Prove" (1994)	"In My Lifetime" (1995)

Ol' Dirty Bastard singles chronology
"Show & Prove" (1994)	"Brooklyn Zoo" (1995)

Sauce Money singles chronology
"Hit" (1993)	"Show & Prove" (1994)	"Bring It On" (1996)

Music video
- "Show & Prove" on YouTube

"Show & Prove" is a single and posse cut from the Big Daddy Kane album Daddy's Home. The song was produced by DJ Premier, and features guest verses from Scoob Lover, Sauce Money, Shyheim, Ol' Dirty Bastard, and a then unknown Jay-Z. Though the single did not top charts, it did receive moderate acclaim, most notably from AllMusic's John Bush, who called the song "irresistible" and praised Jay-Z's fast-paced raps.

== Samples ==
"Show & Prove" features vocal samples of Slick Rick from the song "The Show" by Doug E. Fresh featuring Slick Rick. In one verse Slick Rick says "Bust a move we 'Show & Prove'". That line was used in the intro to this song. It also contains a sample of the Grover Washington Jr. song "Black Frost".

== Music video ==
The music video (directed by Lionel C. Martin) contains all seven rappers, as well as Slick Rick (in the beginning) and the Killa Beez (including Busta Rhymes), and Junior M.A.F.I.A. at an unknown location in what seems to be a New York City park.
