= Money Ain't a Thang =

Single by Jermaine Dupri featuring Jay-Z

from the album Life in 1472 and Vol. 2... Hard Knock Life
- Released: May 11, 1998
- Recorded: 1997
- Studio: Krosswire Studios (Atlanta, Georgia)
- Genre: Hip-hop
- Length: 4:14
- Label: So So Def; Columbia
- Songwriters: Jermaine Mauldin; Shawn Carter; Buddy Hank; Roger Parker; Steve Arrington; Charles Carter
- Producer: Jermaine Dupri

Jermaine Dupri singles chronology
"With Me" (1998)	"Money Ain't a Thang" (1998)	"Sweetheart" (1998)

Jay-Z singles chronology
"It's Alright" (1998)	"Money Ain't a Thang" (1998)	"Can I Get A..." (1998)

"Money Ain't a Thang" is the second single from Jermaine Dupri's 1998 album Life in 1472. It features rapper Jay-Z and appears as a bonus track on his album Vol. 2... Hard Knock Life. It is produced by Dupri, who samples "Weak at the Knees" by Steve Arrington for the track's beat. It can be found on two of Jay-Z's greatest hits compilations: Chapter One: Greatest Hits and Greatest Hits. In addition, it was nominated for Best Rap Performance by a Duo or Group at the 41st Grammy Awards in 1999.

The title of "Money Ain't a Thang" appears as "Money Ain't a Thing" on the vinyl single, but not on the CD single or any album it appears on.

== Formats and track listings ==
=== CD ===
1. "Money Ain't a Thang (Radio Edit)" (4:16)
2. "Money Ain't a Thang (Instrumental)" (4:16)
3. "Money Ain't a Thang (Acappella)" (4:15)
4. "Money Ain't a Thang (Call Out Hook No. 1)" (:10)
5. "Money Ain't a Thang (Call Out Hook No. 2)" (:05)

=== Vinyl ===
==== A-Side ====
1. "Money Ain't a Thing (LP Version)" (4:18)
2. "Money Ain't a Thing (Instrumental)" (4:16)

==== B-Side ====
1. "Money Ain't a Thing (Radio Edit)" (4:16)
2. "Money Ain't a Thing (A Cappella)" (4:15)

== Charts ==
Chart (1998)	Peak position
US Billboard Hot 100	52
US Hot R&B/Hip-Hop Songs (Billboard)	10
US Hot Rap Songs (Billboard)	28
US Rhythmic Airplay (Billboard)	24

== See also ==
- List of songs recorded by Jay-Z
