= Middle Finger U =

Middle Finger U.

Studio album by Sauce Money
- Released: May 23, 2000
- Genre: Hip hop
- Length: 1:06:33
- Label: Priority
- Producer: Stanley "Mr. Rapture" Frazier; Daven "Prestige" Vanderpool; DJ Clark Kent; DJ Premier; EZ Elpee; Jaz-O; Marley Marl; Omonte Ward; Sean Combs; Spencer Bellamy

Singles from Middle Finger U.
- 1. "Middle Finger U." Released: November 24, 1998

Professional ratings
Review scores
Source	Rating
AllMusic	3/5 stars
RapReviews	4/10
The Source	3.5/5 stars
XXL	L (3/5)

Middle Finger U. is the only studio album by American rapper Sauce Money. It was released on May 23, 2000, via Priority Records. The production was handled by Mr. Rapture, DJ Clark Kent, Spencer Bellamy, Daven "Prestige" Vanderpool, DJ Premier, EZ Elpee, Jaz-O, Marley Marl, Omonte Ward and Sean Combs. It features guest appearances from Jay-Z, Memphis Bleek, Puff Daddy, Bam-Bue and Maverick. The album peaked at No. 72 on the Billboard 200 and at No. 19 on Top R&B/Hip-Hop Albums in the United States.

== Track listing ==
No.	Title	Producer(s)	Length
1.	"Intro"	Stanley "Mr. Rapture" Frazier	1:31
2.	"We Gonna Rock"	Stanley "Mr. Rapture" Frazier	4:55
3.	"Love & War"	Omonte Ward	3:34
4.	"For My Hustlaz"	Stanley "Mr. Rapture" Frazier	4:11
5.	"Middle Finger U"	DJ Clark Kent	3:32
6.	"Do You See" (featuring Puff Daddy)	Daven "Prestige" Vanderpool; Sean "Puffy" Combs	4:40
7.	"Face Off 2000" (featuring Jay-Z)	DJ Clark Kent	4:01
8.	"What's That Fuck That"	Marley Marl	4:39
9.	"Chart Climbin'"	Big Jaz	4:19
10.	"Crime Skit"		1:49
11.	"Intruder Alert"	DJ Premier	4:26
12.	"C My 1's" (featuring Bam-Bue)	Spencer Bellamy	4:25
13.	"Pre-Game" (featuring Jay-Z)	Spencer Bellamy	3:54
14.	"Say Unkle"	Stanley "Mr. Rapture" Frazier	2:23
15.	"Section 53, Row 78" (featuring Maverick)	Stanley "Mr. Rapture" Frazier	3:08
16.	"What's My Name"	Stanley "Mr. Rapture" Frazier	5:12
17.	"V1 Skit"		1:49
18.	"What We Do" (featuring Memphis Bleek)	EZ Elpee	3:49
Total length:			1:06:33

Notes

- Track #4 contains elements from "Far From Over" by Frank Stallone
- Track #9 contains elements from "Time Is Tight" by Booker T. & the M.G.'s
- Track #15 contains a sample from "Living inside Your Love" by Earl Klugh
- Track #17 contains a sample form "Hot Nights" by Imagination

== Charts ==
Chart (2000)	Peak position
US Billboard 200	72
US Top R&B/Hip-Hop Albums (Billboard)	19
