= In My Lifetime (song) =

Single by Jay-Z
- B-side: "I Can't Get Wid Dat"
- Released: 1994; July 26, 1995 (reissue)
- Recorded: 1994–95
- Genre: East Coast hip-hop; hardcore hip-hop
- Length: 4:28
- Label: Roc-A-Fella; Payday; FFRR (reissue)
- Songwriter: Shawn Carter
- Producer: Ski

Jay-Z singles chronology
"Show & Prove" (1994)	"In My Lifetime" (1994)	"Dead Presidents" (1996)

Music video
- "In My Lifetime" on YouTube

"In My Lifetime" is the debut single by American rapper Jay-Z. It is produced by Ski and contains samples from "Oh Baby" by Aretha Franklin and two Soul II Soul songs: "Back to Life (However Do You Want Me)" and "Get a Life". The original white label version of the single was sold by Jay-Z and his friend Damon Dash out of Dash's car in 1995. On July 26 2026, "In My Lifetime" was released to all streaming platforms as part of a schedule of old single releases for the 30th anniversary of his debut album, Reasonable Doubt.

It was originally released as an indie label release by Roc-A-Fella Records in 1994, then later re-released on Payday Records in 1995. However, Jay-Z had royalty conflicts with the label and soon decided to grow Roc-A-Fella Records. The single features a remix by Big Jaz and the B-side, "Can't Get Wid That" produced by Clark Kent. The song is not featured on either of Jay-Z's first two albums, but the Big Jaz remix is featured on the Streets Is Watching soundtrack.

== Formats and track listings ==
=== Vinyl b/w "I Can't Get Wid Dat" ===
==== A-Side ====
1. "In My Lifetime"
2. "In My Lifetime (Radio Edit)"
3. "In My Lifetime (Instrumental)"

==== B-Side ====
1. "I Can't Get Wid Dat"
2. "I Can't Get Wid Dat (Radio Edit)"
3. "I Can't Get Wid Dat (Instrumental)"

=== CD ===
1. "In My Lifetime (Big Jaz Radio Remix)" (4:18)
2. "In My Lifetime (Original Ski Radio Version)" (4:10)
3. "In My Lifetime (Skistrumental)" (4:28)
4. "In My Lifetime (Big Jazmental Remix)" (4:05)

=== Vinyl ===
==== A-Side ====
1. In My Lifetime (Original Ski Radio Version) (4:10)
2. In My Lifetime (Original Ski Street Version) (4:28)
3. In My Lifetime (Ski instrumental) (4:28)

==== B-Side ====
1. In My Lifetime (Big Jaz Radio Remix) (4:48)
2. In My Lifetime (Big Jazmental Remix) (4:05)
3. Can't Get Wit That (DJ Clark Kent Version) (4:10)

== See also ==
- List of songs recorded by Jay-Z
