= Streets Is Watching (film) =

1998 film directed by Abdul Malik Abbott

- 10th Anniversary DVD cover
- Directed by: Abdul Malik Abbott
- Written by: Abdul Malik Abbott; Damon Dash; Shawn "Jay-Z" Carter
- Produced by: Schavaria Reeves
- Starring: Jay-Z
- Cinematography: Abdul Malik Abbott; Henry Adebonojo; Joaquín Baca-Asay; Charles Houston
- Edited by: Abdul Malik Abbott
- Production companies: Blue Music Productions; CMO Productions; Roc-A-Fella Films
- Distributed by: PolyGram Video; Universal Pictures
- Release date: May 12, 1998
- Running time: 61 minutes
- Country: United States
- Language: English

Streets Is Watching is a 1998 American musical drama film in which Jay-Z composes a film with many of his unreleased music videos tied into a storyline. The film takes place in Jay-Z's old neighborhood in Brooklyn, New York. The film uses transitional skits between music from Jay-Z's albums Reasonable Doubt and In My Lifetime, Vol. 1. The film is noteworthy because it contains Jay-Z's first two videos, "In My Lifetime" and "I Can't Get Wit That", both released without a major label contract. Each skit is meant to accompany the music it precedes. The same setting or set of the videos are also the same set for the correlating skit.

== Soundtrack ==
- Streets Is Watching (soundtrack)

== See also ==
- Moonwalker, a film by Michael Jackson that also compiles music videos into a continuous film.
