= Feelin' It (Jay-Z song) =

Single by Jay-Z featuring Mecca

from the album Reasonable Doubt
- B-side: "Friend or Foe"
- Released: April 15, 1997
- Recorded: 1995
- Studio: D&D Studios (New York City, New York)
- Genre: East Coast hip hop; jazz rap
- Length: 3:48
- Label: Roc-A-Fella; Priority
- Songwriters: Shawn Carter; David Willis
- Producer: Ski

Jay-Z singles chronology
"I'll Be" (1997)	"Feelin' It" (1997)	"Who You Wit" (1997)

Music video
- "Feelin' It" on YouTube

"Feelin' It" is the fourth and final single from rapper Jay-Z's debut album Reasonable Doubt. The song features a chorus sung by Mecca and a beat produced by Ski. The song's beat contains a sample from "Pastures" by jazz musician Ahmad Jamal. The track was originally meant to be a Camp Lo song, but producer Ski gave it to Jay at the last minute. He describes the situation in an XXL Magazine article:

It was me and Geechi Suede from Camp Lo, it was my hook and everything. Jay heard it and was like, "I want that record. I don't care what you do, I want that record." I didn't want to give it to him, but I had to because I knew he was going to be the man at the time. So I said, "Fuck it, take the record." It really was me and Suede from Camp Lo, the flow and everything, the way he was flowing on it. That's the way we was flowing on it. So he just took the whole thing. But you know, he killed it in his own way.

The chorus of the song was mocked by rapper 50 Cent in his song "Be a Gentleman", from his 2002 mixtape, Guess Who's Back?, and is a diss song against Jay-Z.

== Formats and track listings ==
=== CD ===
1. "Feelin' It [Video Version]"
2. "Feelin' It [LP Version]"
3. "Feelin' It TV track"
4. "Friend or Foe"

=== Vinyl ===
==== A-Side ====
1. "Feelin' It (Video Version)"
2. "Feelin' It (TV Track)"

==== B-Side ====
1. "Feelin' It (LP Version)"
2. "Friend or Foe"

== Samples ==
- West Coast rapper Tyga's song, "M.O.E." from his 2013 album Hotel California contains a sample of this song.

== Charts ==
Chart (1997)	Peak position
US Hot R&B/Hip-Hop Songs (Billboard)	46
US Hot Rap Songs (Billboard)	13
US R&B/Hip-Hop Airplay (Billboard)	75

== See also ==
- List of songs recorded by Jay-Z
