= Dead Presidents (song) =

1996 single by Jay-Z

Single by Jay-Z

from the album Reasonable Doubt
- Released: February 20, 1996
- Recorded: 1995
- Studio: D&D Studios (New York City)
- Genre: East Coast hip-hop; gangsta rap; mafioso rap; boom bap
- Length: 3:28 (Original); 4:27 (Dead Presidents II)
- Label: Roc-A-Fella; Priority
- Songwriters: Shawn Carter; David Willis
- Producer: Ski Beatz

Jay-Z singles chronology
"In My Lifetime" (1995)	"Dead Presidents" (1996)	"Ain't No Nigga" (1996)

Music video
- "Dead Presidents" on YouTube

"Dead Presidents" is a song by American rapper Jay-Z. It was released as the first promotional single for Jay-Z's debut album, Reasonable Doubt (1996), though it did not directly appear on the album. It peaked at numbers 45 and 50 on the US Cash Box Top 100 and Billboard Hot 100 charts. A different version of the song, with the same backing track and chorus, but with different lyrics called "Dead Presidents II" appeared on Reasonable Doubt. "Dead Presidents II" was voted number 2 in Rolling Stone's Top 50 Jay-Z Songs. In 2026, Jay-Z released the original version of "Dead Presidents" on streaming services and a limited-edition vinyl, CD and cassette tape version on his website, to celebrate the 30th anniversary of Reasonable Doubt.

The title is slang for money because portraits of dead American presidents appear on most Federal Reserve Notes.

The song was produced by Ski. "Dead Presidents" samples multiple artists including Lonnie Liston Smith's "A Garden of Peace" for the track's melody and A Tribe Called Quest's "Oh My God (remix)" for its percussion; the chorus is a sample of Nas rapping "I'm out for dead presidents to represent me", from his 1994 song "The World Is Yours (Tip Mix)".

== Production ==
In a YouTube video called Ski Beatz - the making of Jay-Z's "Dead Presidents" beat Ski explains how he filtered out the high frequency content of the melody sample (using a lowpass filter) to achieve a more prominent bass line without replaying one in. Ski's Beats, Rhymes & Samples mixtape contains the Q-Tip remix in the context of a "Dead Presidents" sample because the original from "The World is Yours" had altered lyrics in connection to the sampled vocals. At the end of the sample from the chorus, you can hear the "Whose" from "Whose world is this?" from the beginning of the chorus of "The World is Yours".

== Music video ==
The music video features cameos by The Notorious B.I.G., AZ, Lil' Cease, Damon Dash, Kareem "Biggs" Burke, Smoothe da Hustler, and Tyran "Ty Ty" Smith.

== Feud with Nas ==
Nas was originally invited to re-rap the chorus for Jay-Z and appear in the track's music video, but he declined. Some view these two actions as the catalyst of the Jay-Z vs. Nas feud.

When Nas and Jay-Z directly feuded, both rappers discussed the merit of the sampling in the song in individual "diss" records. In Nas' track "Stillmatic Freestyle," he says:

You show off, I count dough off when you sample my voice.

Jay-Z responds to Nas' claims in his song "Takeover" with the lines:

So yeah, I sampled your voice; you was usin' it wrong: you made it a hot line, I made it a hot song. And you ain't get a coin nigga you was gettin' fucked then; I know who I paid God, Serchlite Publishing.

The line was later used in Cassidy's 2005 hit "I'm a Hustla":

Yeah I used dude's voice props to the boy Shawn, He made it a hot line, I made it a hot song.

In 2005 at Jay-Z's I Declare War concert, he performed "Dead Presidents II" with Nas, officially ending their feud.

== Dead Presidents 3 ==
Jay-Z recorded a track called "Dead Presidents 3" around the time of The Black Album but it was never completed. The unfinished song was leaked onto the internet in the fall of 2007, around the release of American Gangster. In it, Jay-Z referenced some of his lyrics from the original "Dead Presidents" and he used the sample but the sample was played in reverse and had a darker more atmospheric and sinister feel to it.

In July 2013 during a rare Twitter Q&A, a fan asked Jay-Z if "Dead Presidents 3" would be released, which led to Jay-Z giving Young Guru and Just Blaze the permission to release the track on Young Guru's SoundCloud account.

== Remixes ==
Many artists have released remixed versions of Dead Presidents with original lyrics (often freestyles) performed over the original sample and chorus. Notable artists to release versions of Dead Presidents include Charles Hamilton, Lil B, Lil Wayne, Drake, Slug of Atmosphere, Chamillionaire, J. Cole, Kendrick Lamar, Akala, Lupe Fiasco, Kano, Logic, Slaughterhouse, AZ, Curren$y, and DJ Premier, who recorded a version with reworked instrumentals from Jay-Z's original lyrics and vocals from Nas' The World is Yours (Remix).

== Charts ==
Chart (1996)	Peak position
US Billboard Hot 100	50
US Hot R&B/Hip-Hop Songs (Billboard)	17
US Hot Rap Songs (Billboard)	4
US Cash Box Top 100	45

2026 chart performance for "Dead Presidents"
Chart (2026)	Peak position
Nigeria Bubbling Under Hot 100 (TurnTable)	19

== Certifications ==
Region	Certification	Certified units/sales
United States (RIAA)	Gold	500,000^{^}
^{^} Shipments figures based on certification alone.

== See also ==
- List of songs recorded by Jay-Z
