= Streets Is Watching (soundtrack) =

Soundtrack album by various artists
- Released: May 12, 1998 (US); September 12, 1998 (UK)
- Recorded: 1994, 1997–1998
- Studio: D&D
- Genres: East Coast hip hop; hardcore hip hop
- Length: 51:25
- Labels: Roc-A-Fella; Team Roc; Def Jam
- Producers: Jay-Z (exec.); Kareem "Biggs" Burke (exec.); Damon Dash (also exec.); AK47; Darrell 'Digga' Branch; Dave G; Dinky Bingham; DJ Clue?; Irv Gotti; Jaz-O; Ken "Duro" Ifill; Mahogany; M.O.P.; Tone Capone; Ty Fyffe; Barry Salter; Christión

Singles from Streets Is Watching
- 1. "It's Alright" Released: April 21, 1998; 2. "Love For Free" Released: June 3, 1998

Professional ratings
Review scores
Source	Rating
AllMusic	2.5/5 stars

Streets Is Watching is the soundtrack album to Abdul Malik Abbott's 1998 film of the same name. It was released on May 12, 1998, via Roc-A-Fella Records/Def Jam Recordings. Production was handled by Mahogany, Jaz-O, AK47, Darrel 'Digga' Branch, Dave G, Dinky Bingham, DJ Clue?, Irv Gotti, Ken "Duro" Ifill, M.O.P., Tone Capone, Ty Fyffe, and Dame Dash, who also served as one of executive producers together with Jay-Z and Kareem "Biggs" Burke. It features appearances from Jay-Z, Christión, Memphis Bleek, Diamonds In Da Rough, DMX, Ja Rule, M.O.P., Noreaga, Rell, Sauce Money, Usual Suspects, and The Ranjahz member Wais. The album fared well commercially reaching #27 on the Billboard 200 and #3 on the Top R&B/Hip-Hop Albums chart and having two singles ("It's Alright" and "Love For Free") appear on the Billboard Hot 100.

== Track listing ==
No.	Title	Writer(s)	Producer(s)	Length
1.	"It's Alright" (performed by Memphis Bleek and Jay-Z)	Shawn Carter; Damon Dash; Imsomie Leeper; David Byrne; Brian Eno; Chris Frantz; Tina Weymouth; Jerry Harrison	Damon Dash; Mahogany	4:03
2.	"Love for Free" (performed by Rell and Jay-Z)	Osborne Bingham; Gerrell Gaddis; Carter; Billy Nichols	Dinky Bingham; Barry Salter (co.)	4:10
3.	"Only a Customer" (performed by Jay-Z)	Carter; Irving Lorenzo; James Johnson	Irv Gotti	5:29
4.	"Pimp This Love" (performed by Christión)	Kenni Ski; Allen Anthony; Anthony Gilmour; Gregory Webster; Walter Morrison; Andrew Noland; Bruce Napier; Marshall Jones; Leroy Bonner; Ralph Middlebrooks; Marvin Pierce	Tone Capone; Christión (co.)	3:39
5.	"Murdergram" (performed by Murder Inc.)	Earl Simmons; Carter; Jeffrey Atkins; Tyrone Fyffe	Tyrone Fyffe	4:54
6.	"The Doe" (performed by Diamonds In Da Rough)	Emmanuel Clemente; Leon Lorick; Darrell Branch; Nona Hendryx	Darrell "Digga" Branch	5:01
7.	"Crazy" (performed by Usual Suspects)	Tavares Reeves; Rasheem Jackson; Jonathan Burks	Big Jaz	4:24
8.	"In My Lifetime (Remix)" (performed by Jay-Z)	Carter; Burks; Trevor Romeo; Hayden Browne	Ski; Big Jaz (rmx)	4:37
9.	"Your Love" (performed by Christión featuring Jay-Z)	Ski; Anthony; Carter; Roger Troutman; Shirley Murdock; Larry Troutman	AK47 (rmx); Dave G (rmx); Damon Dash (rmx)	3:59
10.	"Thugs R Us" (performed by DJ Clue featuring Noreaga)	Ernesto Shaw; Ken Ifill; Victor Santiago	DJ Clue; Ken "DURO" Ifill	3:39
11.	"My Nigga Hill Figga" (performed by M.O.P.)	Jamal Grinnage; Eric Murray	M.O.P.	4:10
12.	"Celebration" (performed by Jay-Z, Memphis Bleek, Sauce Money and Wais)	Carter; Leeper; Todd Gaither; Malcolm Byer; Thomas McClary; Harold Hudson; Larry Davis	Mahogany	3:20
Total length:				51:25

Notes "Celebration" is edited on the explicit version of the album.

Sample credits

- "It's Alright" contains a sample from "Once in a Lifetime", written by David Byrne, Brian Eno, Chris Frantz, Tina Weymouth, and Jerry Harrison; and performed by Talking Heads.
- "Love for Free" contains a sample from "Do It ('Til You're Satisfied)", written by Billy Nichols, and performed by B. T. Express.
- "Only a Customer" contains a sample from "Moon Child", written by James Johnson, and performed by Rick James.
- "Pimp This Love" contains an interpolation of "Pride and Vanity", written by Gregory Webster, Walter Morrison, Andrew Noland, Bruce Napier, Marshall Jones, Leroy Bonner, Ralph Middlebrooks, and Marvin Pierce.
- "The Doe" contains a sample from "You Turn Me On", written by Nona Hendryx, and performed by Labelle.
- "In My Lifetime (Remix)" contains an interpolation of "Get a Life", written by Trevor Romeo and Hayden Browne.
- "Your Love" contains a sample of "Computer Love", written by Roger Troutman, Shirley Murdock, and Larry Troutman; and performed by Zapp.
- "Celebration" contains an interpolation of "Celebrate", written by Thomas McClary, Harold Hudson, and Larry Davis.

== Charts ==
=== Weekly charts ===
Chart (1998)	Peak position
US Billboard 200	27
US Top R&B/Hip-Hop Albums (Billboard)	3

=== Year-end charts ===
Chart (1998)	Position
US Top R&B/Hip-Hop Albums (Billboard)	80
