= Ain't No Nigga =

Single by Jay-Z featuring Foxy Brown

from the album Reasonable Doubt and The Nutty Professor
- Released: March 19, 1996
- Recorded: 1995
- Genre: East Coast hip-hop
- Length: 4:03
- Label: Roc-A-Fella; Priority
- Songwriters: Shawn Carter; Inga Marchand; Jonathan Burks; August Moon; Potter; Lampert; T. Thomas
- Producer: Big Jaz

Jay-Z singles chronology
"Dead Presidents" (1996)	"Ain't No Nigga" (1996)	"Can't Knock the Hustle" (1996)

Foxy Brown singles chronology
"No One Else (Puff Daddy Remix)" (1995)	"Ain't No Nigga" (1996)	"Touch Me, Tease Me" (1996)

Big Jaz singles chronology
"Ain't No Nigga" (1996)	"Waiting" (1996)

"Ain't No Nigga" (edited as "Ain't No Playa") is the second single from American rapper Jay-Z's debut album, Reasonable Doubt (1996), and is featured on the soundtrack to the 1996 film The Nutty Professor, starring Eddie Murphy. It was released on March 19, 1996 by Roc-A-Fella and Priority Records. The track features Foxy Brown and contains uncredited vocals by Jaz-O. It peaked at numbers 45 and 50 on the US Cash Box Top 100 and Billboard Hot 100 charts.

== Background ==
The song's beat is produced by Big Jaz who samples "Seven Minutes of Funk" by the funk band The Whole Darn Family. The song's chorus was sung by Jaz-O, and interpolates "Ain't No Woman (Like the One I've Got)" by the Four Tops. The "Ain't No Nigga" single goes under the clean alias "Ain't No Playa". Foxy Brown was 17 at the time when the song was released.

Citing the funky production and lyrics about unfaithful relationships, Spence D. of IGN describes it as "one of the better opposite sex rap duets ever laid on wax."

"Ain't No Nigga" is cited as playing a significant role in securing Jay-Z's record deal with Def Jam. According to Sony BMG A&R Nick Raphael, "Will Socolof of Freeze Records sent me a CD and a video and said to me, "This guy is incredible, but he needs a bigger label to take over. Are you interested?" The record he sent to me was "Ain't No Nigga" and I went crazy, thinking that I had to sign him!"

== Music video ==
The music video of the song, which was shot in Miami, starts with a scene similar to a scene of the film Scarface. It features cameos by The Notorious B.I.G., Irv Gotti, and Mic Geronimo.

== Formats and track listings ==
=== Vinyl ===
A-Side

1. "Ain't No Playa (Rae & Christian Mix)"
2. "Ain't No Playa (Original Mix)"

B-Side

1. "Ain't No Playa (Fresh to Def Mix)"
2. "Ain't No Playa (New York Street Mix)"

=== Vinyl (remixes) ===
A-Side

1. "Ain't No Nigga (Ganja Kru Mix)"

B-Side

1. "Can't Knock the Hustle (Desired State Remix)"

== Charts ==
Chart (1996)	Peak position
US Billboard Hot 100	50
US Hot R&B/Hip-Hop Songs (Billboard)	17
US Hot Rap Songs (Billboard)	4
US R&B/Hip-Hop Airplay (Billboard)	24
US Cash Box Top 100	45

== See also ==
- List of songs recorded by Jay-Z
