= Can't Knock the Hustle (Jay-Z song) =

Single by Jay-Z featuring Mary J. Blige

from the album Reasonable Doubt
- Released: August 27, 1996
- Studio: D&D Studios, New York City. Mixed at Platinum Island Studios
- Genre: Hip-hop
- Length: 5:17
- Label: Roc-A-Fella; Priority
- Songwriters: Shawn Carter; Jerome Foster; Marcus Miller
- Producers: Knobody; Nomad (co-producer); Dahoud Darian (co-producer); Sean C (co-producer)

Jay-Z singles chronology
"Ain't No Nigga" (1996)	"Can't Knock the Hustle" (1996)	"I'll Be" (1997)

Mary J. Blige singles chronology
"Touch Me, Tease Me" (1996)	"Can't Knock the Hustle" (1996)	"All That I Got Is You" (1996)

Music video
- "Can't Knock the Hustle" on YouTube

"Can't Knock the Hustle" is the third single from American rapper Jay-Z's debut album Reasonable Doubt. The song features a beat produced by Knobody. It is co-produced by Sean C and Dahoud Darien. The chorus is sung by Mary J. Blige, which contains an interpolation of the song "Fool's Paradise" by Meli'sa Morgan, with slightly modified lyrics. A live version of "Can't Knock the Hustle" found on the bonus disc of Kingdom Come features Beyoncé singing the song's hook.

== Background ==
"Can't Knock the Hustle" marked Knobody's first foray into outside production after the rap group he was in disbanded. Knobody had been very pleased with the last track he had produced for the band and, together with Sean C, had taken it to the nearby home of Roc-A-Fella's Damon Dash. Dash then showed it to Jay-Z, who was suitably impressed and encouraged the young producer to contribute beats. Knobody then gave Jay-Z the backing track to what would become "Can't Knock The Hustle". The rapper then recorded the track.

Combat Jack spoke to Complex about the record. Saying "This song was an effing pain in the ass, as it was the beginning of the end of my run with Roc-A-Fella. Because Dame 'dated' Mary J. Blige briefly, right before she blew up, she did him a solid and dropped her cameo on 'Can't Knock The Hustle.' This was supposed to be the first official single, and like B.I.G., Mary J. Blige was running this 'Queen of R&B and Hip Hop' shit. And like 'Brooklyn's Finest,' the label did not want to have her associated with some unknown 'Jay-Z' rapper dude. In response to my request, MCA/Universal records flat-out ordered Dame to remove any and all types of Mary references from Reasonable Doubt. This was bad, mainly because Dame had spent mad money advertising how the song featured Mary, and there was even a full-page ad out in The Source! "I decided to pull a favor from one of my colleagues that was a top exec at Universal. Granting me a solid, he said they'd allow for Mary to remain on the album—only no singles, no videos, and no advertising. Dame was pissed, and had me set up a conference call with said Universal connect. On the call, as my connect was explaining to Dame why Mary could not appear on a single, Dame lost it and asked dude if he owned Universal. When dude said he didn't, Dame laid into him (and me) about how I had him dealing with 'peons.' My heart dropped and I immediately dropped Dame from the call. Pissed that I just wasted a major favor, and having dude now totally done with me, I continued to apologize to my connect for Dame's behavior. I damn near had to suck him off to keep Mary J. Blige on the album. Pause. Afterwards, I had a major argument with Dame, how he could go ahead and burn his bridges, but how there was no way in hell I'd allow him to burn any more of mine. You could say that that's when we started hating each other. Switching to plan B, Dame had to replace Mary's vocals with Me'lissa Morgan's for the single. Me'lissa was also featured in the video. Dame did keep the Mary version on the album. It wasn't Mary's fault, but there was mad drama behind this song."

A space was left for the hook, which the Latin singer Veronica was originally supposed to sing, but for which Mary J. Blige stepped in after Roc-A-Fella had contacted her and she heard the track and immediately wanted to get involved. The appearance of Blige was considered a major coup because the label was an independent and Jay-Z was unknown at the time. Blige came up with the idea for the chorus., which is a vocal interpolation of a verse from "Fool's Paradise" by Meli'sa Morgan, with slightly modified lyrics.

A live version of "Can't Knock the Hustle" found on the bonus disc of Kingdom Come features Beyoncé singing the song's hook. The song's beat has been heavily sampled by UK soul singer Lemar in his song "50/50".

== Reception ==
Aside from reaching #73 on The Billboard Hot 100 and #30 on the UK Singles Chart, "Can't Knock the Hustle" also garnered much critical acclaim. As Steve Juon of RapReviews.com states: "Knobody put together an incredibly smooth opening track for Jay that became the mantra of his career. With a bouncy beat and Mary J. Blige on the hook, the song was infinitely danceable, but the lyrics he spit were far from just the average shit." Juon also considers the Hype Williams-directed music video for "Can't Knock the Hustle" to be "movie quality."

== Formats and track listings ==
=== CD ===
1. "Can't Knock the Hustle (Original Mix)"
2. "Can't Knock the Hustle (Instrumental)"
3. "Can't Knock the Hustle (Acapella)"
4. "Can't Knock the Hustle (Hani Remix)"

=== Vinyl ===
==== A-Side ====
1. "Can't Knock the Hustle (Original Mix)"
2. "Can't Knock the Hustle (Instrumental)"
3. "Can't Knock the Hustle (Acapella)"

==== B-Side ====
1. "Can't Knock the Hustle (Hani Remix)"

== Charts ==
Chart (1996–1997)	Peak position
UK Singles (Official Charts)	30
UK Dance (Official Charts)	6
UK Hip Hop/R&B (Official Charts)	7
US Billboard Hot 100	73
US Hot R&B/Hip-Hop Songs (Billboard)	35
US Hot Rap Songs (Billboard)	7
US R&B/Hip-Hop Airplay (Billboard)	41
US Cash Box Top 100	72

== See also ==
- List of songs recorded by Jay-Z
