= Daddy's Home (Big Daddy Kane album) =

Studio album by Big Daddy Kane
- Released: September 13, 1994
- Recorded: 1994
- Genre: East Coast hip hop
- Length: 50:33
- Label: MCA
- Producer: Big Daddy Kane; L.G.; Easy Mo Bee; DJ Premier; Da Rock; Kool Tee; Crush

Big Daddy Kane chronology
Looks Like a Job For… (1993)	Daddy's Home (1994)	Veteranz Day (1998)

Singles from Daddy's Home
- 1. "Show & Prove" Released: August 13, 1994

Professional ratings
Review scores
Source	Rating
AllMusic	4/5 stars
Robert Christgau	(neither)
Rolling Stone	2.5/5 stars

Daddy's Home is the sixth album by emcee, Big Daddy Kane. It is Big Daddy Kane's only album on MCA Records, released in September 13, 1994. Like his previous album Looks Like a Job For…, Daddy's Home was generally well-received, but lacked in sales. Despite the positive reviews, the album saw a large drop in Kane's commercial popularity, and produced no crossover hit singles, like 1993's "Very Special".

The album features the singles "In the PJ's" and the DJ Premier-produced posse cut "Show & Prove", featuring Ol' Dirty Bastard, Shyheim, Sauce Money and a then-unknown Jay Z (credited as "J.Z."), who, at the time, was Kane's protégé. Kane's longtime producer Easy Mo Bee produced three songs on Daddy's Home and was set to bring in a fourth song for the album. However, Kane rejected it. Easy Mo Bee later gave the track to the Notorious B.I.G., which he would use for the song "Warning" for his 1994 debut Ready To Die.

Following the release of Daddy's Home, Kane took a long break from music, until returning four years later with his seventh album Veteranz Day.

== Track listing ==
No.	Title	Writer(s)	Producer(s)	Length
1.	"Daddy's Home"	Big Daddy Kane; Patrick Harvey	L.G.	3:06
2.	"Brooklyn Style...Laid Out" (featuring Big Scoob)	Big Daddy Kane; Osten Harvey	Easy Mo Bee	3:56
3.	"In the PJ's" (featuring Big Scoob)	Big Daddy Kane	Big Daddy Kane	4:06
4.	"Show & Prove" (featuring Big Scoob, Sauce Money, Shyheim, Jay-Z and Ol' Dirty Bastard)	Johnny Jackson; Todd Gaither; Shyheim Franklin; Big Daddy Kane; Shawn Carter; Russell Jones; DJ Premier	DJ Premier	5:47
5.	"Lyrical Gymnastics"	Big Daddy Kane; Patrick Harvey; Barry White; Smead Hudman	L.G.	3:55
6.	"That's How I Did 'Em"	Big Daddy Kane; Osten Harvey	Easy Mo Bee	3:24
7.	"Sex According to the Prince of Darkness"	Big Daddy Kane; Duane Ramos	Da Rock	3:44
8.	"3 Forties and a Bottle of Moët"	Big Daddy Kane	Big Daddy Kane	1:39
9.	"The Way It's Goin' Down"	Big Daddy Kane; Osten Harvey	Easy Mo Bee	4:01
10.	"Somebody's Been Sleeping in My Bed"	Big Daddy Kane	Big Daddy Kane	3:19
11.	"W.G.O.N.R.S." (featuring Easy Dred and Junior P)	Big Daddy Kane	Big Daddy Kane	4:37
12.	"Let Yourself Go"	Big Daddy Kane; Tadone Wilson	Kool T; Crush	4:09
13.	"Don't Do It to Yourself" (featuring Big Scoob)	Big Daddy Kane; Johnny Jackson	Big Daddy Kane	4:51

Sample credits

- "In the PJ's" contains samples from "Close the Door", written by Kenneth Gamble and Leon Huff, and performed by Teddy Pendergrass.
- "Show & Prove" contains samples from "The Show", performed by Doug E. Fresh.
- "Lyrical Gymnastics" contains samples from "You're the One I Need", written by Barry White and Smead Hudman, and performed by Barry White.
- "3 Forties and a Bottle of Moët" contains samples from "Yes We Can Can", written by Allen Toussaint, and performed by The Pointer Sisters.
- "Somebody's Been Sleeping in My Bed" contains samples from:
  - "Somebody's Been Sleeping", performed by 100 Proof (Aged in Soul).
  - "I'm Your Hoochie Coochie Man", written by Willie Dixon.
- "W.G.O.N.R.S." contains samples from "What's Going On" and "Inner City Blues", performed by Marvin Gaye.
- "Let Yourself Go" contains excerpts from "Pot Belly", as performed by Lou Donaldson.

== Charts ==
=== Album ===
Chart (1994)	Peak position
US Billboard 200	155
US Top R&B/Hip-Hop Albums (Billboard)	26

=== Singles ===
Year	Song	Chart positions
Year	Song	US Hot Rap Singles
1994	"In the PJ's"	31
