= Reasonable Doubt (album) =

Studio album by Jay-Z
- Released: June 25, 1996
- Recorded: 1994–1996
- Studios: D&D Studios, New York City
- Genres: East Coast hip-hop; mafioso rap; boom bap
- Length: 55:32
- Labels: Roc-A-Fella; Priority
- Producers: Damon Dash; Big Jaz; Clark Kent; DJ Irv; DJ Premier; Knobody; Peter Panic; Ski; K-Rob

Jay-Z chronology
Reasonable Doubt (1996)	In My Lifetime, Vol. 1 (1997)

Singles from Reasonable Doubt
- 1. "Ain't No Nigga" Released: March 26, 1996; 2. "Can't Knock the Hustle" Released: August 29, 1996; 3. "Feelin' It" Released: April 15, 1997

Reasonable Doubt is the debut studio album by American rapper Jay-Z. It was released on June 25, 1996, by his own record label Roc-A-Fella Records and distributed by Priority Records. The album features production provided by DJ Premier, Ski, Knobody and Clark Kent, and also includes guest appearances from Memphis Bleek, Mary J. Blige, Jaz-O, and the Notorious B.I.G., among others. The album features mafioso rap themes and gritty lyrics about the "hustler" lifestyle and material obsessions.

Reasonable Doubt debuted at number 23 on the US Billboard 200, on which it charted for 18 weeks. It was promoted with four singles; including "Ain't No Nigga" and "Can't Knock the Hustle". Reasonable Doubt was certified Platinum by the Recording Industry Association of America (RIAA) and, as of 2006, has sold 1.5 million copies in the United States. A critical success, it has been ranked on several publications' lists of hip-hop's greatest albums, while many hip hop fans have viewed it as Jay-Z's best work. In August 2019, Reasonable Doubt was released to digital and streaming platforms under Roc Nation's independent label, Equity Distribution.

== Background ==
In 1989, aspiring rapper Jay-Z was recruited by mentor Jaz-O to appear on his song "Hawaiian Sophie". He appeared on two more Jaz-O songs in the next year, but after Jaz-O was dropped from his record label, Jay-Z dealt drugs to support himself. He continued to pursue a rap career and appeared on two songs from Original Flavor's 1993 album Beyond Flavor. Jay-Z then caught Big Daddy Kane's attention and toured with him; they collaborated on Kane's 1994 posse cut "Show & Prove" along with Wu-Tang Clan's Ol' Dirty Bastard, Wu-Tang affiliate Shyheim, Sauce Money, and Scoob Lover.

Despite the exposure he received from Kane, Jay-Z was still without a record deal. He began selling tapes from his car with help from friend Damon Dash. The success of his street-level marketing led to a deal with Payday Records, which released his first solo single, "In My Lifetime" and its B-side "I Can't Get wit Dat". In an unconventional move, Jay-Z then spurned the record contract he had long sought and left Payday Records to form his own label, Roc-A-Fella Records, with Damon Dash and Kareem "Biggs" Burke. Jay-Z later explained that he thought he could do a better job of marketing his records on his own:

[Payday] eventually signed me to a deal, but were acting shady the whole time, like they didn't know how to work a record or something. The things that they were setting up for me I could have done myself. They had me traveling places to do instores, and my product wasn't even available in the store. We shot one video, but when the time came for me to do the video for the second single, I had to be cut out. They gave me the money and I started my own company. There was a little arguing back and forth, but our conflict finally got resolved. The bottom line was they wasn't doing their job, so I had to get out of there.

Jay-Z rented a small, cheap office for Roc-A-Fella Records on John Street in one of the "dreariest parts of the busiest city in the world". Jay-Z and his compatriots thought of their low-rent headquarters as a "starting point" that would eventually lead them to Manhattan. In 1995 and early 1996, Jay-Z appeared on records by Big L and Mic Geronimo, further raising his profile. At this point, he was still considered an "underground" rapper with a "new jack" style.

== Recording ==
Reasonable Doubt was recorded at D&D Studios and mixed at Platinum Island, however, its beats were formed elsewhere. "Can't Knock the Hustle" was produced by Knobody at his mother's home in 1994, while the vocals were recorded on tour at a studio in Tampa, Florida named Progressive Music with Mary J. Blige. Ski produced "Feelin' It" and "Politics as Usual" while recording with Camp Lo. The recording sessions were often competitive; Ski and Clark Kent created similar beats for "Politics as Usual", but Ski submitted his to Jay-Z first causing his to appear on the album. "Brooklyn's Finest" was a competitive, though friendly battle between Jay-Z and the Notorious B.I.G. in which Jay-Z tried proving that he was of Biggie's caliber as an artist, while Biggie tried brushing his rhymes off as insignificant. Although the rappers had already met on the set for the "Dead Presidents" music video, they discovered that neither wrote down their rhymes while recording. The recording of "Brooklyn's Finest" spanned two months and moved from D&D Studios to Giant Studios where the Clark Kent-sung chorus was recorded. Irv Gotti and Dame Dash noted that Nas was supposed to be featured on "Bring It On" and "Can I Live", but sessions for neither song ended up happening.

== Music and lyrics ==
An East Coast hip-hop record, Reasonable Doubt was noted for having mafioso rap themes, with lyrics characterized by Stylus Magazine as "gritty realism". Writer Dream Hampton believed that although rappers had alluded to hustling before, Jay-Z "talks about what it can do to a person's inner peace, and what it can do to their mind". Jay-Z later said, "the studio was like a psychiatrist's couch for me" while recording Reasonable Doubt. AllMusic's Steve Huey described him as "a street hustler from the projects who rapped about what he knew—and he was very, very good at it...detailing his experiences on the streets with disarming honesty". Huey summarizes the album's subject matter saying:

He's cocky bordering on arrogant, but playful and witty, and exudes an effortless, unaffected cool throughout. And even if he's rapping about rising to the top instead of being there, his material obsessions are already apparent [...] the album's defining cut might [...] be the brief "22 Two's," which not only demonstrates Jay-Z's extraordinary talent as a pure freestyle rapper, but also preaches a subtle message through its club hostess: Bad behavior gets in the way of making money. Perhaps that's why Jay-Z waxes reflective, not enthusiastic, about the darker side of the streets.

AllMusic's Jason Birchmeier writes that the album's production exhibits characteristics of "the pre-gangsta era, a foregone era when samples fueled the beats and turntablism supplied the hooks", which "sets Reasonable Doubt apart from Jay-Z's later work". "Can't Knock the Hustle" features a smooth beat. "Politics as Usual" has an R&B sound and a sample of "Hurry Up This Way Again" by the Stylistics. "Dead Presidents" samples Nas' voice from "The World Is Yours" in its chorus. According to IGN's Spence D., "Ski brings back the stripped down piano fill style lending the track a late night jazz vibe" on "Feelin' It", and "22 Two's" has a "mournful jazz inclined groove" that prominently features string instruments. "Coming of Age" contains a Clark Kent-produced beat that samples the melody and drums from "Inside You" by Eddie Henderson.

== Critical reception ==
Professional ratings
Review scores
Source	Rating
AllMusic	5/5 stars
Entertainment Weekly	B+
IGN	7.8/10
Los Angeles Daily News	3/4 stars
MSN Music (Expert Witness)	A−
Pitchfork	9.4/10
The Rolling Stone Album Guide	5/5 stars
The Source	4/5 stars
Tom Hull – on the Web	A−
XXL	5/5

Reasonable Doubt was met with widespread acclaim from music critics. Charlie Braxton of The Source praised Jay-Z for evolving "from hip-hop sidekick to Mafia-style front man, blowing up the spot with vivid tales about the economic reality fueling what's left of contemporary ghetto politics". Entertainment Weekly's Dimitri Ehrlich commended him for rapping "with an irresistible confidence, a voice that exudes tough-guy authenticity", also noting the "unadorned but suitably militant" production. Tonya Pendleton of the Los Angeles Daily News stated that the album "hits you with rap's trends – Mary J. Blige riffs, Foxy Brown rhymes, Isley Brothers loops and more fashion info than Cindy Crawford", adding that "his sassy way with a lyric transcends the material" on the album.

=== Retrospect ===
Reasonable Doubt has often been considered by many fans to be Jay-Z's best record. According to Birchmeier, it differed from his subsequent albums by lacking "pop-crossover" songs and hits. Shaheem Reid of MTV explained, "Reasonable Doubt might not have the radio hits or club bangers of many of his other albums, but it may be Jay at his most lyrical—and certainly at his most honest, according to him". Huey said the lyrical appeal lied within Jay-Z's "effortless, unaffected cool" flow, and knack for "writing some of the most acrobatic rhymes heard in quite some time". According to Huey, this "helped Reasonable Doubt rank as one of the finest albums of New York's hip-hop renaissance of the '90s". Birchmeier, on the other hand, believed the superior quality of producers was more responsible for the album's reputation as a classic more so than Jay-Z. In a retrospective review for MSN Music, Robert Christgau said the album was "designed for the hip-hop cognoscenti and street aesthetes who still swear he never topped it," finding it "richer than any outsider could have known, and benefiting from everything we've since learned about the minor crack baron who put his money where his mouth was. You can hear him marshalling a discipline known to few rappers and many crack barons, and that asceticism undercuts the intrinsic delight of his rhymes".

== Commercial performance ==
Reasonable Doubt was released by Roc-A-Fella on June 25, 1996, through a distribution deal with Priority. It was not an immediate success, reaching a peak position of 23 on the Billboard 200 chart, with a sales total of 43,000 in its first week. It spent 18 weeks on the chart, and 55 weeks on the Top R&B/Hip-Hop Albums, on which it reached number 3. The album was promoted with the release of four singles, none of which reached the Top 40; "Ain't No Nigga" was the highest-charting single at number 50, "Can't Knock the Hustle" and "Feelin' It" did not peak higher than 70, and "Dead Presidents" did not chart altogether. By year end, the album had sold 420,000 copies.

On February 7, 2002, Reasonable Doubt was certified Platinum by the Recording Industry Association of America (RIAA), for shipments of a million copies in the US. It remains the lowest charting album of Jay-Z's career. According to Respect magazine, it had sold 1.5 million copies in the United States by 2006.

Following extensive citywide "JAŸ-Z30" anniversary activations in New York City and the release of limited-edition 30th-anniversary physical reissues, Reasonable Doubt experienced a significant commercial resurgence during the tracking week of June 26 – July 2, 2026. According to early projection and industry tracking data, the album moved approximately 29,000 equivalent album units, driven heavily by physical purchases. This surge allowed the 1996 record to impact multiple weekly Billboard charts for the chart week dated July 11, 2026. The album re-entered the Billboard 200 at No. 24, marking its first appearance on the main United States albums chart since 1997. It also achieved a historic format milestone by debuting at No. 1 on the Vinyl Albums chart, securing Jay-Z his first-ever career appearance and top placement on that specific format-based ranking.

Additionally, the physical reissues propelled Reasonable Doubt to a new lifetime career peak of No. 3 on the Top Album Sales chart. Within specific genre charts, the record achieved a new lifetime peak of No. 5 on the Top Rap Albums chart and secured a top-ten placement at No. 8 on the Top R&B/Hip-Hop Albums chart. This commercial momentum was further sustained into mid-July by a major spike in digital streaming following Jay-Z's celebratory homecoming concerts at Yankee Stadium.

== Legacy and influence ==
Since its initial reception, Reasonable Doubt has received further acclaim from music critics and writers. According to Pitchfork's Ryan Schreiber, it has often been "considered one of hip-hop's landmark albums", while Birchmeier said it was viewed like Nas' Illmatic (1994) as a classic hip hop album by a young rapper about their street and criminal experiences. Reasonable Doubt helped transfigure gangsta rap into mafioso rap, popularizing the subgenre and the imagery of high class, expensive lifestyles and tastes in hip hop, including drinking Cristal, driving Lexus automobiles, and living out the plots of films such as Scarface and Carlito's Way. In the opinion of Miles Marshall Lewis, Reasonable Doubt was a "seminal" work that "shocked the world ... a personal touchstone for fans then Jay's own age who were getting their own hustles on—hip hop's young, gifted, and black". Jay-Z said that recreating Reasonable Doubt would be challenging, as he was living a different lifestyle with a completely different state of mind when he wrote the album.

Reasonable Doubt was named one of the greatest hip hop albums of all time by The Source in 1998, Vibe, who ranked it seventh on their 2002 list, MTV.com, who ranked it sixth on their 2005 list, and About.com's Henry Adaso; Adaso ranked it as the 14th greatest hip hop album, the second best rap record of 1996, and the fifth most "essential" hip hop album ever. Blender included Reasonable Doubt on the magazine's 2003 list of "500 CDs You Must Own Before You Die". That same year, Rolling Stone ranked it number 248 on their list of the 500 Greatest Albums of All Time, number 250 on the 2012 revision, and the album's rank shot up to number 67 on the 2020 reboot of the list. The magazine also named it the 17th best album of the 1990s. It was included in Vibe's "51 Essential Albums" (2004), and Hip Hop Connection's "The 100 Greatest Rap Albums 1995–2005". In 2025, the album achieved peak institutional recognition when the Recording Academy inducted it into the Grammy Hall of Fame as part of its 2025 class, celebrating its long-term qualitative and historical impact on American music history. In 2026, Reasonable Doubt was ranked No. 1 on Consequence's list of the top 60 albums of 1996.

In 2006, Jay-Z performed the songs from Reasonable Doubt at the Radio City Music Hall to celebrate its tenth anniversary. The concert's band included the Roots' drummer Questlove, the Illadelphonics, a 50-piece orchestra dubbed the Hustla's Symphony and Just Blaze, the performance's disc jockey. On "Can't Knock the Hustle", Beyoncé replaced Mary J. Blige, who was preparing for her Breakthrough Tour at the time. Jay-Z rapped the Notorious B.I.G.'s verses on "Brooklyn's Finest", and Jaz-O's verse was left out of "Bring It On". Jay-Z added a verse to "22 Two's" in which he says variations of the words "for/four" 44 times over the beat of "Can I Kick It?" by A Tribe Called Quest. Other alterations include Jay-Z changing a lyrical mention of Cristal to Dom Pérignon and Jay-Z's band "spruc[ing] up tracks like 'Regrets' to add more energy". Celebrities such as Alicia Keys, Young Jeezy, Jadakiss, Chris Tucker, LeBron James and Carmelo Anthony attended the concert. 3,000 tickets were put on sale; all were sold within two minutes according to Roc-A-Fella Records' website.

Following decades of critical acclaim, Reasonable Doubt received formal institutional enshrinement when it was inducted into the Grammy Hall of Fame as part of the 2025 class. The Recording Academy honored the independent release at an official induction gala in Los Angeles on May 16, 2025, celebrating its long-term qualitative and historical impact on the music industry. It was the only hip-hop album selected for enshrinement within its induction group.

In support of the album's thirtieth anniversary, Jay-Z held on a number of concerts in Philadelphia, New York City, Los Angeles, and Paris. At the New York City Show on July 10, 2026, Beyoncé performed Mary J. Blige's chorus on "Can't Knock the Hustle", Nas performed versions of "The World Is Yours" and "N.Y. State of Mind", and Blue Ivy Carter performed the keys on "Feelin' It".

=== Anniversaries ===
On June 25, 2006, Jay-Z celebrated the album's 10th anniversary by performing Reasonable Doubt in its entirety at Radio City Music Hall. Backed by a 50-piece orchestra and hip-hop band The Roots, the concert featured guest appearances from original album collaborators including Mary J. Blige and Memphis Bleek. To coincide with the performance, a special 10th Anniversary Edition vinyl package was released independently through Roc-A-Fella Records.

In June 2016, the album's 20th anniversary was commemorated with the release of a 35-minute promotional mini-documentary titled RD20, which featured interviews with key album architects including DJ Premier, Roc-A-Fella Records co-founder Kareem "Biggs" Burke, and photographer Jonathan Mannion. For the milestone, the album was also temporarily made exclusive to the Tidal streaming service.

To celebrate the album's 30th anniversary in 2026, Jay-Z launched a dedicated commemorative platform, jayz30.com, and reverted his digital streaming profile name to the stylized "JAŸ-Z" to match the original 1996 album cover typography. The campaign included massive citywide pop-up activations throughout New York City and a limited-edition 30th-anniversary white vinyl reissue distributed through Target. The resurgence culminated in July 2026 with a three-night series of sold-out, celebratory headlining concerts at Yankee Stadium.

== Track listing ==
No.	Title	Writer(s)	Producer	Length
1.	"Can't Knock the Hustle" (featuring Mary J. Blige)	Shawn Carter; Marcus Miller; Jerome Foster	Knobody; Sean Cane^{[a]}; Dahoud^{[a]}	5:17
2.	"Politics as Usual"	Carter; David Willis; Cynthia Biggs	Ski	3:41
3.	"Brooklyn's Finest" (featuring the Notorious B.I.G.)	Carter; Rodolfo Franklin; Christopher Wallace	Clark Kent; Dame Dash^{[a]}	4:36
4.	"Dead Presidents II"	Carter; Lonnie Liston Smith; Willis	Ski	4:27
5.	"Feelin' It" (featuring Mecca)	Carter; Willis	Ski	3:48
6.	"D'Evils"	Carter; Christopher Martin	DJ Premier	3:31
7.	"22 Two's"	Carter; Willis	Ski	3:29
8.	"Can I Live"	Carter; Irving Lorenzo	DJ Irv	4:10
9.	"Ain't No Nigga" (featuring Foxy Brown)	Carter; Inga Marchand; Jonathan Burks	Big Jaz	4:03
10.	"Friend or Foe"	Carter; Martin	DJ Premier	1:49
11.	"Coming of Age" (featuring Memphis Bleek)	Carter; Franklin; James Mtume	Clark Kent	3:59
12.	"Cashmere Thoughts"	Carter; Franklin	Clark Kent	2:56
13.	"Bring It On" (featuring Big Jaz and Sauce Money)	Carter; Martin; Burks; Todd Gaither	DJ Premier	5:01
14.	"Regrets"	Carter; Patty F. Di Pasquale	Peter Panic	4:34
Total length:				55:32

Limited edition and digital bonus track
No.	Title	Writer(s)	Producer(s)	Length
15.	"Can't Knock the Hustle" (Fool's Paradise remix with Meli'sa Morgan)	Carter; Lorenzo; Lesette Wilson; Meli'sa Morgan	DJ Irv	4:43
16.	"Dead or Alive (Part 1)" (featuring Sauce Money (Japan Bonus))			3:43

Reissue bonus track
No.	Title	Writer(s)	Producer(s)	Length
15.	"Can I Live II" (featuring Memphis Bleek)	Carter; Malik Johnson; Malik Cox	K-Rob	3:57

Notes

- ^{^[a]} signifies a co-producer.
- "Can't Knock the Hustle" features intro vocals by Pain in Da Ass.
- "Brooklyn's Finest" features intro vocals by Pain in Da Ass and background vocals by DJ Clark Kent.
- "22 Two's" features additional vocals by Mary Davis.
- "Ain't No Nigga" features additional vocals by Khadijah Bass and Big Jaz.

Sample credits

- "Can't Knock the Hustle" contains samples of "Much Too Much" by Marcus Miller, "I Know You Got Soul" by Eric B. & Rakim and interpolations of "Fool's Paradise" by Meli'sa Morgan, and dialogue from the film Scarface.
- "Politics as Usual" contains a sample of "Hurry Up This Way Again" by The Stylistics.
- "Brooklyn's Finest" contains samples of "Ecstasy" by The Ohio Players, "Brooklyn Zoo" by Ol' Dirty Bastard and interpolates dialogue from the film Carlito's Way.
- "Dead Presidents II" contains samples of "A Garden of Peace" by Lonnie Liston Smith, "The World Is Yours (Tip Mix)" by Nas, and "Oh My God (Remix)" by A Tribe Called Quest.
- "Feelin' It" contains a sample of "Pastures" by Ahmad Jamal.
- "D'Evils" contains samples of "Go Back Home" by Allen Toussaint, "I Shot Ya (Remix)" by LL Cool J and "Murder Was the Case" by Snoop Dogg.
- "22 Two's" contains an interpolation of "Can I Kick It?" by A Tribe Called Quest.
- "Can I Live" contains a sample of "The Look of Love" by Isaac Hayes.
- "Ain't No Nigga" contains a sample of "Seven Minutes of Funk" by The Whole Darn Family and interpolations of "Ain't No Woman (Like the One I Got)" by The Four Tops.
- "Friend or Foe" contains a sample of "Hey What's That You Say" by Brother to Brother.
- "Coming of Age" contains a sample of "Inside You" by Eddie Henderson.
- "Cashmere Thoughts" contains a sample of "Save Their Souls" by Bohannon.
- "Bring It On" contains a sample of "1, 2 Pass It" by D&D All-Stars.
- "Regrets" contains a sample of "It's So Easy Loving You" by Earl Klugh and Hubert Laws.
- "Can I Live II" contains a sample of "Mother's Day" by 24-Carat Black.
- "Dead or Alive Part 1" contains a sample of "Bigger's Theme" by Mtume.

== Personnel ==
- Jay-Z – performer, executive producer
- Damon Dash – producer, executive producer
- Kareem "Biggs" Burke – executive producer
- Big Jaz – producer, performer, mixing
- Memphis Bleek – performer
- Notorious B.I.G. – performer
- Sauce Money – performer
- Mary J. Blige – vocals
- Foxy Brown – performer
- Mecca – vocals
- Ski – producer, mixing
- DJ Premier – producer, mixing
- Clark Kent – producer, mixing
- DJ Irv – producer, mixing
- Sean Cane – producer
- Dahoud – producer
- DJ Peter Panic – producer, mixing
- Kenny Ortíz – engineer, mixing
- Joe Quinde – engineer, mixing
- Eddie Sancho – engineer, mixing
- Carlos Bess – mixing
- Adrien Vargas – art direction, design
- Cey Adams – artwork
- Jonathan Mannion – photography

== Charts ==
=== Weekly charts ===
Chart (1996)	Peak position
US Billboard 200	23
US Top R&B/Hip-Hop Albums (Billboard)	3

Chart (2026)	Peak position
US Billboard 200	24
US Vinyl Albums (Billboard)	1
US Top Album Sales (Billboard)	3
US Top Rap Albums (Billboard)	5
US Top R&B/Hip-Hop Albums (Billboard)	8

=== Component charts ===
Chart	Year	Peak position	Ref.
UK Hip Hop & R&B Albums (OCC)	1997	19	
UK Hip Hop & R&B Albums (OCC)	2026	16	

=== Year-end charts ===
Chart (1996)	Position
US Top R&B/Hip-Hop Albums (Billboard)	30

== Certifications and sales ==
Region	Certification	Certified units/sales
United Kingdom (BPI)	Gold	100,000^{^}
United States (RIAA)	Platinum	1,514,000
^{*} Sales figures based on certification alone.^{^} Shipments figures based on certification alone.

== See also ==
- It Was Written
- Only Built 4 Cuban Linx...
