= All Money Is Legal =

2000 studio album by Amil

Studio album by Amil
- Released: August 29, 2000
- Studios: The Cutting Room, The Hit Factory, Quad Studios (New York City); Playground Studios (Los Angeles)
- Genre: Hip hop
- Length: 51:52
- Labels: Roc-A-Fella; Columbia; Sony
- Producers: Amil (exec.); Jay Z (exec.); Damon Dash (exec.); Kareem Burke; G. Robertson; EZ Elpee; Jay "Waxx" Garfield; Poke & Tone; Ty Fyffe; Rockwilder; Chavon "Scripture" Henry

Amil chronology
All Money Is Legal (2000)	Amil Az Iz (2008)

Singles from All Money Is Legal
- 1. "I Got That" Released: July 5, 2000; 2. "4 da Fam" Released: July 29, 2000

All Money Is Legal, also known as A.M.I.L.: (All Money Is Legal), is the only studio album by American rapper Amil. It was released on August 29, 2000, through Roc-A-Fella, Columbia, and Sony Music. Jay-Z, Damon Dash, and Amil served as executive producer with a team of producers that included Just Blaze. Before the album's release, Amil was best known for her feature on Jay-Z's 1998 single "Can I Get A...". She was one of several up-and-coming artists signed to Roc-A-Fella, alongside Memphis Bleek and Beanie Sigel, who released an album in 2000. Although it was her only album on Roc-A-Fella, Amil had been closely associated with the label and its co-founder Jay-Z, earning the moniker "First Lady of Roc-A-Fella".

A hip hop album, the lyrics of All Money Is Legal focus on wealth and, to a lesser degree, Amil's personal life. It was recorded at Playground Studios in Los Angeles and at The Cutting Room, The Hit Factory, and Quad Studios in New York City. Although Jay-Z had written Amil's verses for their past collaborations, she wrote her own lyrics for all the album's tracks. Amil mostly raps throughout the album, but sings on some tracks. According to academic commentators and music critics, Amil adopted the persona of a "gold digger" throughout the album.

Reviews were mixed, the production and Amil's verses dividing critics. The album peaked at number 45 on the US Billboard 200 chart. Two singles – "I Got That" with vocals from Beyoncé and "4 da Fam" with verses from Memphis Bleek, Beanie Sigel, and Jay-Z – were released from the album and promoted with music videos. "I Got That" reached number one on the Bubbling Under R&B/Hip-Hop Singles Billboard chart, and "4 da Fam" charted on the Hot R&B/Hip-Hop Songs. Shortly after the release of All Money Is Legal, Amil was dropped from the Roc-A-Fella roster. Rumors circulated within the industry that her departure stemmed from personal conflict with Jay-Z. Years later, she publicly denied the rumors and said she had left because she was unable to handle industry pressures and wanted to have more time to care for her child. Although her music career continued, Amil did not sign to another major label and she dropped out of the commercial mainstream of hip hop.

== Background and recording ==
In 1997, Amil formed the girl group Major Coins with Liz Leite and Monique. Amil was not interested in being a solo artist at the time and was uncertain about pursuing a career as a rapper, and later said, "I never looked at it as going beyond me being known in the streets." When Jay-Z asked Leite to provide vocals for "It's Like That" from his third studio album Vol. 2... Hard Knock Life (1998), Amil accompanied her to the recording studio. Jay-Z asked Amil to freestyle during the sessions, and her vocals were featured on the album single "Can I Get A...". He later encouraged her to become a solo artist.

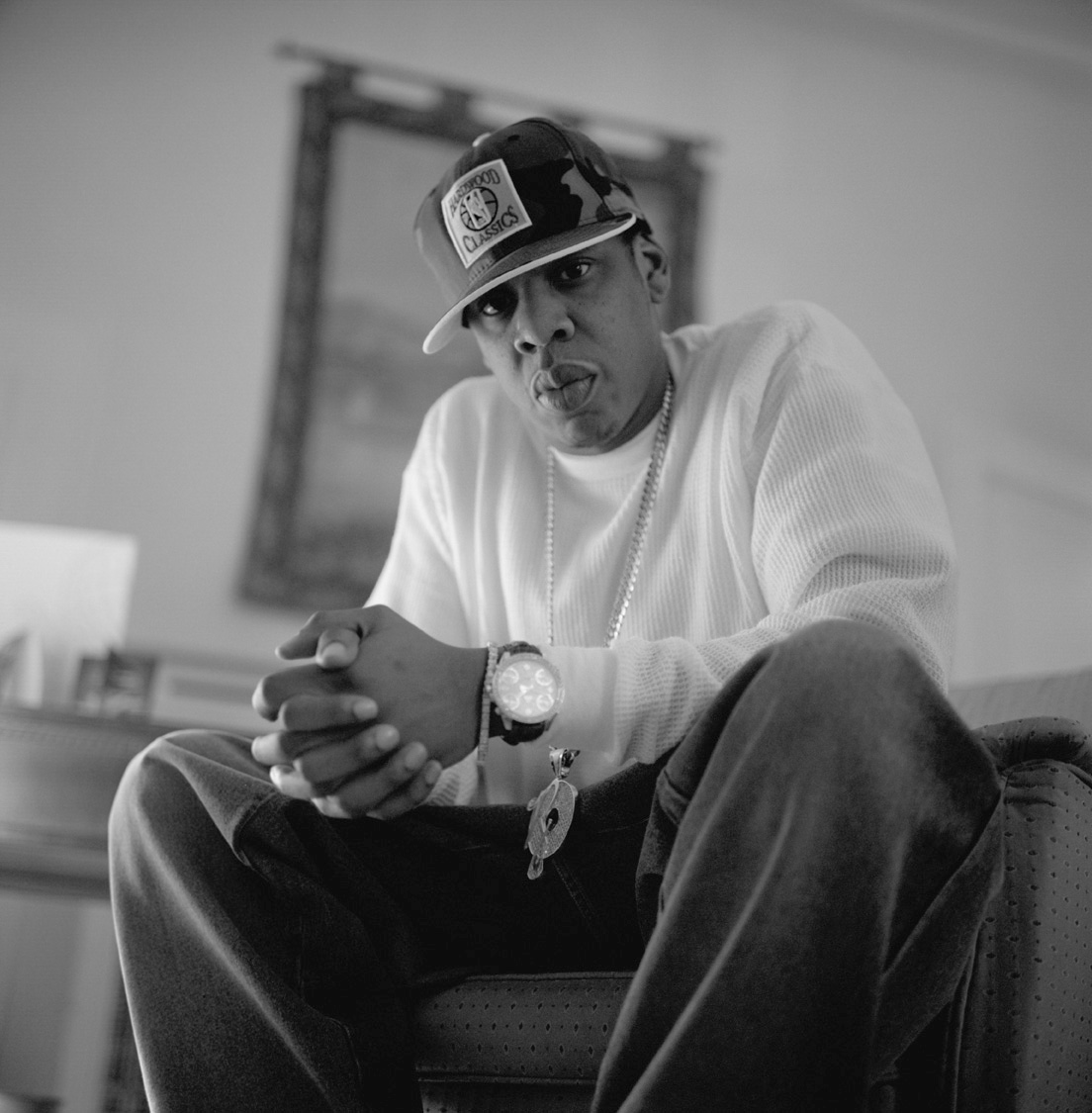
Jay-Z (pictured in 2003) signed Amil to Roc-A-Fella and encouraged her development as a solo artist.

After Major Coins disbanded, Jay-Z signed Amil to Roc-A-Fella in 1998. She was one of several new artists signed to the label, and she became a high-profile member of the label and received the nicknames "Diana Ross" and "the First Lady of Roc-A-Fella". According to a 2015 Fact article, Amil's signing to the label became the subject of industry gossip. She denied reports of a pregnancy involving a married man and a romantic relationship with Jay-Z. Foxy Brown accused Jay-Z of using Amil to try to create a new artist similar to herself. In a 2003 interview, he denied these claims and said he stopped working with Brown in favor of Amil because the two women frequently fought on tour.

Before the release of her debut album, Amil featured on albums by Mariah Carey, Jermaine Dupri, Tamar Braxton, and Funkmaster Flex. She collaborated again with Jay-Z for the 1999 singles "Nigga What, Nigga Who (Originator 99)" and "Do It Again (Put Ya Hands Up)" and the 2000 song "Hey Papi". Jay-Z wrote all of Amil's verses for these collaborations. She also performed on his Hard Knock Life tour. Amil, who became known as one of Jay-Z's protégés, described her work with him as "a natural thing" and "always smooth". As she told Vibe in 2000, "[He] just put this career in my hands. I went from having nothing at all to wearing diamonds." The same year, she appeared in a Sprite advertisement campaign alongside Roxanne Shante, Mia X, Angie Martinez, and Eve; they are referred to as the Five Deadly Women, a reference to the 1978 film Five Deadly Venoms. Amil was also the only prominent woman in the 2000 documentary Backstage.

All Money Is Legal was recorded at The Cutting Room, The Hit Factory, and Quad Studios in New York City, and Playground Studios in Los Angeles. Amil, Jay-Z, and Damon Dash were the album's executive producers. It was one of several albums from up-and-coming artists at Roc-A-Fella to be released in 2000, along with Memphis Bleek's The Understanding and Beanie Sigel's The Truth. Amil has co-writing credits on all the album's songs, and Jay-Z said she had a "talent for song-making". To be taken seriously as a solo artist by "naysayers who say Jay is her puppeteer", Amil said: "I kept this album me — nothing more, nothing less." She said she wanted to avoid sexual topics on All Money Is Legal and had planned not to use any profanity in her future music, explaining: "I know I sin, but I'm trying to become a better person." Producer Just Blaze contributed to All Money Is Legal, and felt his work on the album raised his profile within Roc-A-Fella. Beyoncé recorded her guest vocals for "I Got That" in 2000 in a separate recording session. Her then-manager Mathew Knowles paid Roc-A-Fella for the featured spot as a way to assess her viability as a solo artist, since she was still a part of Destiny's Child at the time. As a result of this collaboration, Beyoncé worked with her future husband Jay-Z for the first time.

== Composition and lyrics ==
All Money Is Legal is a hip hop album with 13 tracks. Alongside Just Blaze, the album's production team included Tyrone Fyffe, Jon-John Robinson, LES, Poke & Tone, Rockwilder, EZ Elpee, Chavon Henry, Sean Lashley, K-Rob, Jay Garfield, Lofey, and Omen. David Browne, writing for Entertainment Weekly, described its compositions as having "low slung beats and [an] uncluttered vibe" similar to Jay-Z's music from that era, and the Dayton Daily News' Talia Jackson said the album had his signature funk samples and R&B choruses.

"I Got That"
David Browne wrote that Amil used a "sultry, sing songy rapping" style throughout the album, and cited "I Got That" as an example.

"Smile 4 Me"
"Smile 4 Me" was noted for its "mournful backing music" (the New York Daily News' Jim Farber) and as one of the album's "melancholy confessionals" (Ta-Nehisi Coates).

Lyrically, the songs on All Money Is Legal focus mainly on material possessions and money, as evidenced by the album title. Some tracks touch on more personal issues, specifically "Smile 4 Me" and "Quarrels". The New York Daily News' Jim Farber wrote that Amil was more personal in her music than Foxy Brown and Lil' Kim, whom he described as "sexy cartoons". Amil raps most of her vocals on the album, but also sings on several tracks like "Get Down". Critics have referred to Amil's rapping style as sing songy, and Farber said she "specializes in short, jabbing melodies".

The opening track "Smile 4 Me" was inspired by Amil's life, and includes the lyrics: "Got my people up north trying to slice the bid / While I'm in love with a nigga with a wife and a kid." On "Smile 4 Me", Amil retells aspects of her life before her music career, such as living on welfare and shoplifting. The second song, "I Got That", features Beyoncé on its chorus and encourages women to become more independent. Commentators compared the song to music released by Destiny's Child, and a Spin writer said it continues the "statement[s] of simple financial and romantic independence" found throughout Beyoncé's discography. Amil references Satan as being at the root of all business in the bass-heavy track "Quarrels", which has additional vocals by R&B singer Thomas. Other critics interpreted the song as being about an unhealthy relationship. In "Girlfriend", she worries about infidelity after taking a woman's boyfriend, and raps about the shame of going "from Gucci sandals back to no-name brands" on "Anyday".

Amil's lyrics on All Money Is Legal have been cited as an example of the theme of "gold digging" in hip hop performed by women. In a 2003 academic paper, women's studies professor Layli D. Phillips and social psychology professor Dionne P. Stephens cited Amil and All Money Is Legal as part of a trend of female hip hop artists performing the stereotypical role of a "Gold Digger". Along with the "Freak", "Diva", and "Dyke", Phillips and Stephens named the "Gold Digger" as one of the major archetypes adopted by female rappers, defining the role with the following terms:

"The Gold Digger will supposedly resort to any and all sexual means to gain whatever financial rewards she wants or needs, seeing men as stepping stones to provide for short-term needs. Short term is not defined so much by a length of time, but rather a mind set whereby the male is good for as long as he can meet the Gold Digger's demands. She takes whatever she can, and when the well runs dry, the Gold Digger is history."

They highlighted the lyric "You know I gotta keep tricks up the sleeve, leav' em bankrupt with blue balls till the dick bleed" from the title track "All Money is Legal (A.M.I.L.)" as an example of the Gold Digger persona in Amil's music. Vibe's Andréa Duncan wrote that Amil used the album to balance her onstage persona as a gold digger with her more mellow personality in her personal life. Len Righi, writing for The Morning Call, described Amil's style as "golddigger rap", but noted the album contained songs that were "not all diamonds and major coins".

All Money Is Legal includes three features from Jay-Z. Amil and Jay-Z rap about materialism on "Heard It All", which features the pair attempting to scam one another. He also contributed to "That's Right" after hearing Just Blaze's production during a recording session. His final appearance is the album closer "4 da Fam", also featuring Memphis Bleek and Beanie Sigel. For his verse in "4 da Fam", Jay-Z rapped about expecting a child: "I got four nephews and they're all writing ... and I'm having a child, which is more frightening." A column in Vibe interpreted the line as a pregnancy announcement from Jay-Z, who was an uncommitted bachelor at the time. In a 2000 statement to the New York Daily News, Jay-Z denied these reports. He had his first child, Blue Ivy, with Beyoncé in January 2012.

== Release and promotion ==
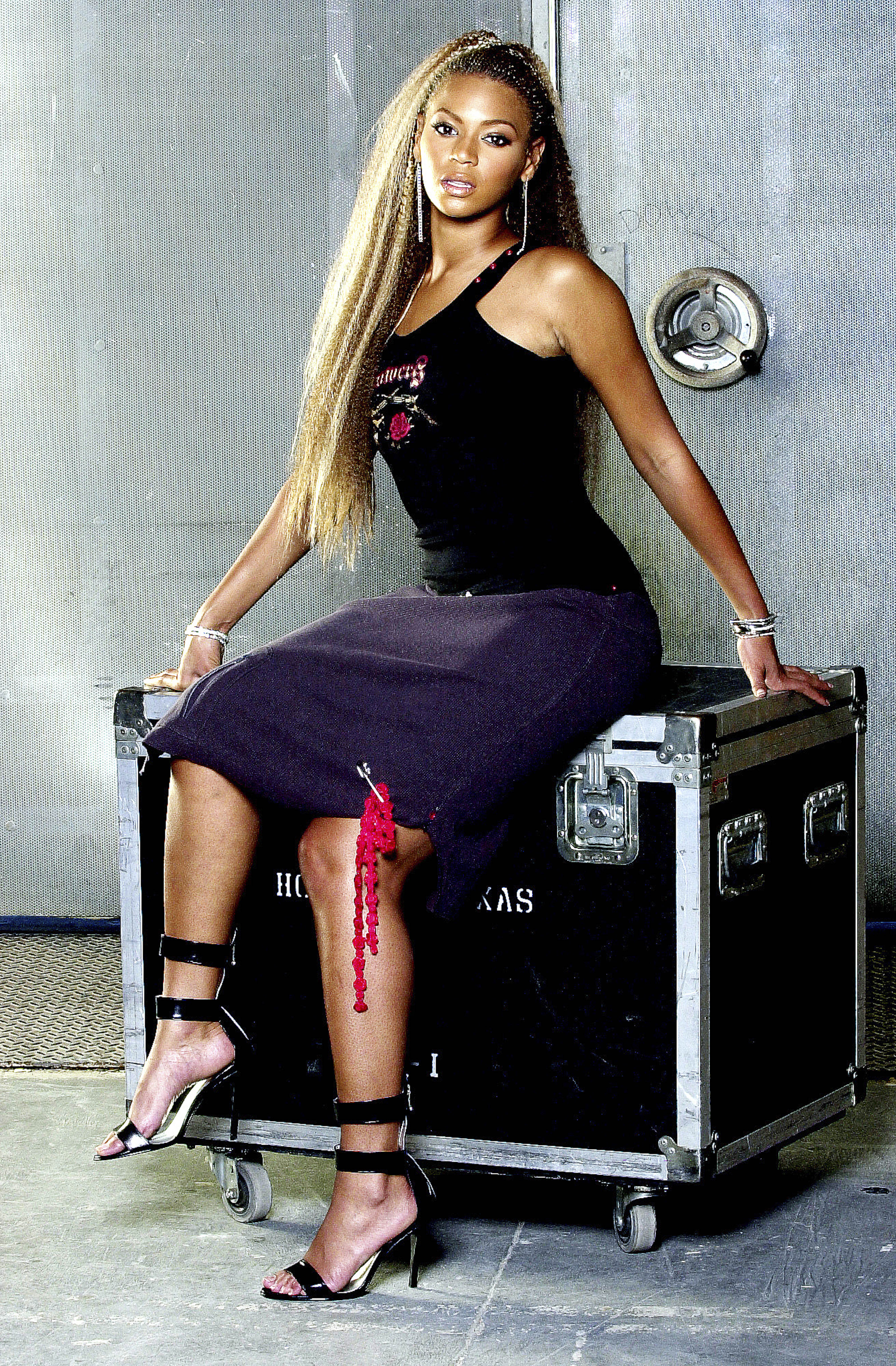
Beyoncé (pictured in 2001) was featured on the album's lead single, "I Got That".

"I Got That" was released on July 5, 2000, as the album's lead single. The music video for "I Got That" appeared on the list of BET's most-played clips for the weeks of August 1 and 8, 2000. The video also played on The Box—a now-defunct music video network—during the same two weeks. Kathy Iandoli of Dazed praised "I Got That" as a showcase for Amil's potential as a rapper. Conversely, Vibe named the song among the year's worst artistic pairings in hip hop for its Beyoncé feature. "I Got That" reached number one on the Bubbling Under R&B/Hip-Hop Singles Billboard chart on September 16. Beyoncé's vocals have been applauded retrospectively; Andrew Unterberger at Spin said the song "deserved better, and Bey's breathy chorus is a big reason why", and Iandoli said that "Beyoncé did Amil the favor of her life" with her feature.

All Money Is Legal was released through Roc-A-Fella, Columbia, and Sony Music on August 29, 2000, as a cassette, and CD. It was issued in both an "explicit" version with a Parental Advisory label and a "clean" version with edited lyrics. The album had originally been scheduled for a release in early August. With an acronym form matching the artist's name, All Money Is Legal is alternately titled A.M.I.L.: (All Money Is Legal). The album sold 29,000 copies in the first week of its release, and simultaneously debuted and peaked at number 45 on the US Billboard 200 chart. On the Billboard Top R&B/Hip-Hop Albums chart, All Money Is Legal reached its peak position at number 12 on October 7, 2000, and was on the chart for a total of eight weeks.

The second single, "4 da Fam", was released on July 29, 2000, (Note: "4 da Fam" appeared on the Hot Rap Songs Billboard chart in the July 29, 2000 issue of Billboard. The information for the chart is gathered by "a national sample of retail store sales reports".) and issued as a Double A-Side with "I Got That"; an accompanying "4 da Fam" music video had premiered earlier in the summer. For a 2017 Vulture article, John Kennedy called it "the real deal," comparing it favorably to “Pop 4 Roc,” another Roc-A-Fella posse cut from Vol. 3… Life and Times of S. Carter. In a 2018 Complex article, Andrew Barber and Al Shipley considered "4 da Fam" to be "really a Jay record" despite being on Amil's album; they praised Jay-Z for having "the best verse and batt[ing] clean up". The song peaked at number 99 on the Hot R&B/Hip-Hop Songs Billboard chart and number 29 on the Hot Rap Songs Billboard chart. "That's Right" and "Get Down" were released on a 12-inch single and vinyl record as promotional singles.

== Critical reception ==
Professional ratings
Review scores
Source	Rating
AllMusic	3/5 stars
Entertainment Weekly	B
Los Angeles Times	2/4 stars
San Antonio Express-News	3.25/4 stars
USA Today	2/4 stars

The album received a mixed response from critics. In Vibe, Andréa Duncan praised it as a "surprisingly diverse and thoughtful collection of tracks". AllMusic's MacKenzie Wilson said Amil was "bold enough to make it solo" with her "New York childhood street smarts" and a "sultry sassiness" throughout the music. A reviewer for The Source commended the album as "a set that displays [Amil's] feminine flair". and Anthony M. Thompson for the San Antonio Express-News described it as having a "distinct, woman's touch". Despite criticizing All Money Is Legal as "unfortunately titled", Dan DeLuca said in The Philadelphia Inquirer that Amil's rapping abilities distinguished her from other female rappers and allowed her to stand out from the album's featured artists. In Entertainment Weekly, David Browne praised some of the lyrics—specifically, references to Aesop and Blake Carrington—but he dismissed the overall focus on money as unoriginal. Ta-Nehisi Coates, writing for the Washington City Paper, panned All Money Is Legal as "a schizophrenic work" with songs "swinging from aching honesty to gangsta-bitch schtick". Coates deemed the album "self-hating" and said Amil had "reduc[ed] herself to a prostitute with a microphone" with the sexually explicit lyrics.

Several reviewers cited "Quarrels" and "Smile 4 Me" as album highlights. An anonymous review columnist in Billboard praised the autobiographical "Smile 4 Me" as "a testament to [Amil's] lyricism" and wrote that her verses in "Quarrels" on themes of morality would "make heads both nod and think". Despite an overall negative assessment of the album, Coates said Amil had successfully pulled from her past in "melancholy confessionals" like "Smile 4 Me". The Morning Call's Len Righi praised "Smile 4 Me" as the song that Amil best represents her "gritty self-assurance" and "fierce determination". Righi later named All Money Is Legal among the best albums of the year. A Vibe columnist identified "Quarrels", alongside Eve's 1999 single "Love Is Blind", as examples of "strong-willed, pro-woman songs" written and recorded by female rappers. Despite their criticism of Amil's album as inferior to her collaborations with Jay-Z, Soren Baker, writing for the Los Angeles Times, believed she demonstrated "promise when she becomes more personal in her storytelling". On the other hand, the Dayton Daily News' Talia Jackson criticized Amil as "less than believable when she is not rapping about her material world". In a 2014 Billboard interview, Amil said "Smile 4 Me" was one of her favorite songs from the album and that she generally preferred the songs drawn from her personal life.

Retrospective assessments of All Money Is Legal have remained mixed. In a 2018 Rolling Stone article, Rob Sheffield praised Amil for releasing "her own kick-ass album with [an] excellent title" following her early collaboration with Jay-Z. In an article for PopMatters published about three years after the album's release, Terry Sawyer said Amil's music was generic and left only a "fleeting, shrugging impression". He unfavorably compared Amil to rapper Sarai, saying both had "virtually identical", "silken, imploded vocal styles". At Fact, Son Raw said Amil's voice made her music a "love-her-or-hate-her proposition", but highlighted "4 da Fam" as a "prime Roc La Familia-era posse cut". Complex also included All Money is Legal in a 2015 listicle on "factually incorrect" titles for hip hop albums because, in their words, "guess what, Amil, all money is not legal."

== Aftermath ==
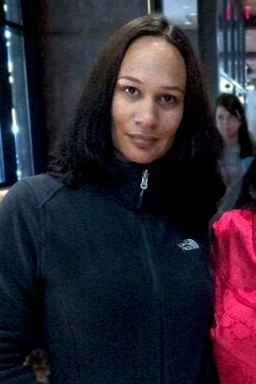
After the album's release, Amil (pictured in 2014) left Roc-A-Fella and mostly dropped out of the public eye.

Amil was removed from the Roc-A-Fella roster shortly after the release of All Money Is Legal. After appearing in a music video alongside the rapper Baby (later known as Birdman), a February 2001 Vibe column speculated that she was likely to sign a record deal with Cash Money, the label he co-founded. But she never signed a deal with Cash Money, and—other than a select few releases—she largely dropped out of the mainstream, major-label recording industry.

Music industry rumors attributed Amil's departure from Roc-A-Fella to personal conflict between her and Jay-Z, as well as his disapproval of her (reported) weight gain. During a 2011 interview with Vibe, she responded to the rumors about her and Jay-Z:

"People think there was bad blood between us, but there never was any bad blood. Things happen and I wasn't ready for where my career was going at that time. It was really overwhelming."

Amil said she took a hiatus from her music career because she was mentally unprepared for the pressures of the industry and she wanted to take care of her child, who suffered from asthma. Describing herself as "rebell[ing] against the industry" after the album's release, she refused to do promotion for it and said: "I faded myself." She said she regretted signing a record deal, preferring to be "an around the way rapper" and a songwriter instead.

Jay-Z did not comment on Amil's departure from Roc-A-Fella at the time and, as of 2017, has still never publicly discussed why Amil was dropped from the label. However, Jay-Z did defend the quality of All Money Is Legal against its detractors in a 2013 appearance on the New York radio show The Breakfast Club. When DJ Envy asked Jay-Z who had been the "worst signing" at Roc-A-Fella, Charlamagne tha God interrupted to say "Amil!" and Jay-Z replied, "Nah, nah, I wouldn't say Amil. Amil's album, you should listen to it. It's good!"

== Track listing ==
Credits adapted from the liner notes of All Money Is Legal.

No.	Title	Writer(s)	Producer(s)	Length
1.	"Smile 4 Me"	Amil Whitehead; Lamont Porter; Wayne Henderson	EZ Elpee	4:26
2.	"I Got That" (featuring Beyoncé)	Whitehead; Shawn Carter; Leshan Lewis; Jean-Claude Olivier; Samuel J. Barnes; Tamy Lestor Smith; Makeda Davis	LES; Poke & Tone	3:17
3.	"Get Down"	Whitehead; Richard Hell; Johnathan Robertson; Jarrett Washington	Jon-John	4:29
4.	"Ya'll Dead Wrong"	Whitehead; Dana Stinson	Rockwilder	3:51
5.	"Heard It All" (featuring Jay-Z)	Whitehead; Carter; Chavon Henry; Sean Lashley; Eldo Di Lazzaro; Bruno Cherubini; Harper	Henry; Lashley; Just Blaze	3:27
6.	"Quarrels" (featuring Carl Thomas)	Whitehead; Jay Garfield; Porter	EZ Elpee; Garfield	4:10
7.	"Girlfriend"	Whitehead; Stinson	Rockwilder	3:14
8.	"All Money Is Legal (A.M.I.L.)"	Whitehead; Tyrone Fyffe	Ty Fyffe	3:46
9.	"That's Right" (featuring Jay-Z)	Whitehead; Carter; Justin Smith; Lionel Evans	Just Blaze	4:21
10.	"Anyday"	Whitehead; Joseph Walsh; Patrick Culie; Malik Johnson	K-Rob	4:08
11.	"Raw"	Whitehead; Michael Sandlofer	Lofey	4:11
12.	"No 1 Can Compare"	Whitehead; Sidney Brown	Omen	4:15
13.	"4 da Fam" (featuring Jay-Z, Memphis Bleek and Beanie Sigel)	Whitehead; Carter; Dwight Grant; Malik Cox; Fyffe	Ty Fyffe	4:19
Total length:				51:52

Sample credits

- "Smile 4 Me" contains a sample from "Summer Love", performed by David Oliver.
- "I Got That" contains a sample from "Seventh Heaven", performed by Gwen Guthrie.
- "Get Down" contains a sample from "Blank Generation", performed by Richard Hell and the Voidoids.
- "Heard It All" contains a sample from the composition "Chitarra Romana", written by Cherubini, Di Lazzaro and Harper.
- "Anyday" contains a sample from "Collage", performed by The Three Degrees.
- "4 da Fam" contains a sample from "Main Theme", by Roy Budd.

== Credits and personnel ==
Credits adapted from AllMusic:

- Amil – associate executive producer, primary artist, vocals
- Beyoncé – featured artist, primary artist
- Shawn Carter – guest artist, primary artist, executive producer
- Kevin Crouse – mixing
- Damon Dash – executive producer
- Tyrone Fyfee – producer
- Chris Gehringer – mastering
- Jason Goldstein – mixing
- Erwin Gorostiza – art direction
- Manny Marroquin – mixing
- Memphis Bleek – guest artist, performer, primary artist
- Monica Morrow – stylist
- Jon-John Robinson – engineer, producer
- Beanie Sigel – guest artist, primary artist
- Brian Stanley – engineer, mixing
- Carl Thomas – guest artist, primary artist, vocals
- Richard Travali – mixing
- Reggie Wells – make-up
- Carlisle Young – engineer

== Charts ==
Chart (2000)	Peak position
US Billboard 200	45
US Top R&B/Hip-Hop Albums (Billboard)	12
