= I Got That =

2000 single by Amil featuring Beyoncé

Single by Amil featuring Beyoncé

from the album All Money Is Legal
- A-side: "4 da Fam"
- Released: July 5, 2000
- Studio: The Hit Factory (New York City); Platinum Post Studios (Winter Park)
- Genre: Hip-hop
- Length: 3:17
- Label: Sony
- Songwriters: Amil Whitehead; Samuel J. Barnes; Jean-Claude Olivier; Shawn Carter; Makeda Davis; LeShan Lewis; Tamy Lestor Smith
- Producers: Poke & Tone; L.E.S.

Amil singles chronology
"Hey Papi" (2000)	"I Got That" (2000)	"4 da Fam" (2000)

Beyoncé singles chronology
"I Got That" (2000)	"Work It Out" (2002)

"I Got That" is a hip-hop song by American rapper Amil from her album All Money Is Legal (2000). She wrote the track with its producers, L.E.S. and Poke & Tone, along with Jay-Z, Makeda Davis, and Tamy Lestor Smith. In the lyrics, Amil encourages women to seek out emotional, financial, and romantic independence. "I Got That" uses a sample from the 1985 Gwen Guthrie song "Seventh Heaven". Beyoncé performs the song's chorus and backing vocals, as her label was trying to assess her viability as a solo artist outside of her girl group Destiny's Child.

Roc-A-Fella and Columbia Records released "I Got That" on July 5, 2000, as the lead single from All Money Is Legal. It was Amil's debut solo single after featuring on songs by Jay-Z and other Roc-A-Fella artists. Jay-Z and Darren Grant directed the music video, which shows Amil and Beyoncé shopping. In the United States, "I Got That" topped the Billboard Bubbling Under R&B/Hip-Hop Singles chart in September 2000. Contemporary critics negatively compared the single to the more personal tracks on the album; later coverage focused on Beyoncé, who was praised for her vocals. According to retrospective articles, the song has largely been forgotten or overlooked since its release.

== Background and recording ==
Jay-Z signed Amil to his record label Roc-A-Fella after she was featured on his 1998 single "Can I Get A...". She was the first female rapper on Roc-A-Fella, working as what music journalist Clover Hope described as "the crew's go-to female voice". A high-profile member in the label, being promoted as its First Lady, Amil continued to collaborate with Jay-Z for "Nigga What, Nigga Who (Originator 99)" and "Do It Again (Put Ya Hands Up)" (both in 1999) and "Hey Papi" (2000), and she appeared on several songs by other Roc-A-Fella artists. Her features received a significant amount of radio airplay; VH1's Renaud Jean-Baptiste Jr. singled out the success of her songs with Jay-Z as leading to the creation of her 2000 album All Money Is Legal.

Amil wrote "I Got That" with its producers—L.E.S. and Poke & Tone members Jean-Claude Olivier and Samuel J. Barnes—along with Jay-Z, Makeda Davis, and Tamy Lestor Smith. In The Source magazine, Aliya S. King contrasted Poke & Tone's work on the song with the rest of the album, which she said was handled by "a slew of up-and-comer producers". "I Got That" was recorded by Steve Sauder at the Hit Factory in New York City, where it was mixed by Rich Travali, and by Mark Mason at Platinum Post Studios in Winter Park, Florida. All of the tracks for All Money Is Legal, including "I Got That", were mastered by Chris Gehringer at Sterling Sound Studios in New York City.

"I Got That" features Beyoncé, who performs the chorus and provides backing vocals. It was her first collaboration with her future husband Jay-Z. Beyoncé recorded her parts in early 2000 during a separate recording session. Her then-manager Mathew Knowles paid Roc-A-Fella for the feature as a way to assess her viability as a solo artist, since she was still a part of girl group Destiny's Child at the time. Beyoncé pursued a solo career three years after "I Got That", releasing her debut album Dangerously in Love in 2003.

== Music and lyrics ==
"I Got That"
Amil was described as using a "sultry, sing songy rapping" style by David Browne and a "girlish, take-no-guff voice" by The Philadelphia Inquirer's Dan DeLuca for "I Got That" and throughout All Money Is Legal.

"I Got That" is a hip-hop song that lasts for three minutes and seventeen seconds. It contains a sample from the 1985 Gwen Guthrie single "Seventh Heaven". Spin writer Andrew Unterberger felt that the composition had a "squelching, slithering" production, while David Browne likened it to music by a girl group in Entertainment Weekly. Browne said that Amil has "sultry, sing songy rapping" style throughout All Money Is Legal, most notably on "I Got That". The Philadelphia Inquirer's Dan DeLuca thought that Amil performs with a "girlish, take-no-guff voice", specifically on "I Got That". Beyoncé's vocals were described as breathy by Unterberger, and as "buttery" by Camille Augustin in Vibe magazine.

The lyrics are about encouraging women to pursue emotional, financial, and romantic independence. Amil conveys this by rapping about how she can support herself without needing anything from men: "I don't need a man to / Do for Amil what Amil can do." She further expresses this by bragging about buying her own clothing, jewelry, and a Mercedes-Benz. Vibe's Desire Thompson highlighted the verse, "What chick you know cock Glocks back?", while summarizing the song as about a "woman having her own with snarky bars to match".

Critics discussed the lyrics in relation to the rest of All Money Is Legal and with Amil's past songs. Clover Hope thought that while Amil's previous songs focus on scamming men to survive, "I Got That" expands her style to include boasting that she is "earning her own money, too". In the San Antonio Express-News, Anthony M. Thompson believed that this focus on female independence represents how Amil was able to give a "distinct, woman's touch" to her album. DeLuca said that Amil carries over a similar message into the album tracks "All Money Is Legal" and "Girlfriend", in which she "surveys a world where everything is for sale and a girl had best look out for herself".

== Release and promotion ==
Roc-A-Fella and Columbia Records released "I Got That" as All Money Is Legal's lead single on July 5, 2000. It was made available on the 12-inch and CD formats, including as a double A-side with the album's second single "4 da Fam" (2000). The song appeared on the compilation albums R&B Masters in 2001 and Urban Sounds: Hip-Hop & Reggae 1996-2000 in 2003.

Jay-Z and Darren Grant directed the single's music video, which features Amil and Beyoncé shopping at stores. American rapper Eve makes a cameo appearance, and Beyoncé wears an outfit that Billboard described as resembling a "fiery cowgirl". It was Beyoncé's first music video as a solo artist. The video was on the list of BET's most-played clips for the weeks of August 1 and 8, 2000, and it also played on The Box—a now-defunct music video network—during the same two weeks.

"I Got That" reached number one on the US Billboard Bubbling Under R&B/Hip-Hop Singles chart for the week of September 16, 2000; it was on the chart for twelve weeks. On the urban contemporary radio chart published by Radio & Records, the song peaked at number forty-six. According to retrospective articles, the single was not well-remembered, either being forgotten or overlooked. In 2018, Desire Thompson wrote that the single had "slipped between the cracks" because of the abundance of female rappers in the early 2000s, such as Da Brat, Eve, Lil' Kim, Missy Elliott, and Trina.

== Critical reception ==
Most of the critical commentary focused on Beyoncé's feature, which Camille Augustin felt complimented Amil's rapping style. Andrew Unterberger believed that the single deserved more commercial success, largely in part to Beyoncé's performance of the chorus. Kathy Iandoli, writing for Dazed, said that Beyoncé turned "I Got That" more into a Destiny's Child song, considering this proof that she was the lead of the group. Amil's rapping was also praised by critics, who said that the song showed that she had a "one-of-a-kind sound" and the potential for a longer music career as "the female rap guest feature". In a more negative review, a writer for Vibe magazine cited "I Got That" as one of the worst hip-hop collaborations in 2000.

Critics compared "I Got That" to other All Money Is Legal tracks. A Billboard reviewer regarded the song as catchy and fit for radio airplay, but preferred Amil rapping about personal issues on "Smile 4 Me" and "Quarrels". The Michigan Chronicle journalist Says Who enjoyed the album and encouraged listeners to explore beyond "I Got That", which was noted as an "easy first single".

== Credits and personnel ==
Credits adapted from the liner notes of All Money Is Legal:

- Amil – vocals, songwriting
- Samuel J. Barnes – songwriting
- Jean-Claude Olivier – songwriting
- Jay-Z – songwriting
- Makeda Davis – songwriting
- L.E.S. – songwriting, production
- Tamy Lestor Smith – songwriting
- Rich Travali – mixing
- Steve Sauder – recording
- Mark Mason – recording
- Chris Gehringer – mastered
