= 4 da Fam =

2000 single by Amil

Single by Amil featuring Jay-Z, Memphis Bleek & Beanie Sigel

from the album All Money Is Legal
- Released: September 13, 2000
- Genre: Hip hop
- Length: 4:19
- Label: Roc-A-Fella
- Songwriters: Amil Whitehead; Shawn Carter; Dwight Grant; Malik Cox; Ty Fyffe
- Producer: Ty Fyffe

Amil singles chronology
| "I Got That" (2000) | "4 da Fam" (2000) |

Jay-Z singles chronology
| "Is That Your Chick (The Lost Verses)" (2000) | "4 da Fam" (2000) | "I Just Wanna Love U (Give It 2 Me)" (2000) |

Memphis Bleek singles chronology
| "Is That Your Chick (The Lost Verses)" (2000) | "4 da Fam" (2000) | "Change the Game" (2001) |

Beanie Sigel singles chronology
| "The Truth" (2000) | "4 da Fam" (2000) | "Change the Game" (2001) |

Music video
- "4 da Fam" on YouTube

"4 da Fam" is a song by American rapper Amil, featuring verses from American rappers Jay-Z, Memphis Bleek, and Beanie Sigel. Ty Fyffe produced the song. It was released on Roc-A-Fella as the second single from her debut album All Money Is Legal. In one of the verses, Jay-Z discusses his fears of becoming a father.

"4 da Fam" received mixed reviews from music critics; some critics praised Jay-Z's verse, while others criticized Amil's contributions. It appeared on several Billboard charts. The song peaked at No. 99 on the Hot R&B/Hip-Hop Songs Billboard chart and No. 97 on the Hot Rap Songs Billboard chart. "4 da Fam" was promoted with a music video, which was played on the music show Artist Corner and the BET network.

== Recording and release ==
Ty Fyffe produced "4 da Fam" and wrote it with Amil Whitehead, Shawn Carter (Jay-Z), Dwight Grant (Beanie Sigel), and Malik Cox (Memphis Bleek). The track was mixed by Pat Viala and recorded by Just Blaze. It was released on September 13, 2000 as the second single from Amil's debut album, All Money Is Legal (2000). The song was made available as a 12-inch single through Roc-A-Fella. It was also included on a double A-side with the album's lead single "I Got That". In advertisements for All Money Is Legal, "4 da Fam" was promoted as one of its "blazin' joints".

A music video, directed by Nick Quested, was released for "4 da Fam" in 2000. It was played that year on the music show Artist Corner and BET. The video was uploaded to Amil's Vevo account on October 25, 2009.

== Composition and lyrics ==
At 4 minutes and 19 seconds long, "4 da Fam" includes verses from Amil, Jay-Z, Memphis Bleek, and Beanie Sigel. Steve Rivers of Ebony described it as a "crew love record". In his verse, Jay-Z raps about becoming a father in the verse: "I got four nephews and they're all writing ... and I'm having a child, which is more frightening." (Note: During a 2000 interview with Vibe, Jay-Z said that his verse was true and he was expecting a child. Further information was never provided, and Rob Markman of MTV News believed the child "was most likely lost through miscarriage".) Rob Markman of MTV News wrote that fatherhood was a subject that Jay-Z explored from his debut album Reasonable Doubt (1996). Jay-Z's other lyrics include: "Y'all niggas truly ain't ready for this dynasty thing / Y'all thinking Blake Carrington, I'm thinking more like Ming." and "I got 4 nephews, and they all write-ing / They all young and wild, plus they all like Beans."

== Reception ==
"4 da Fam" received mixed reviews from music critics. Andrew Barber and Al Shipley of Complex praised Jay-Z's contribution, and wrote that "he had the best verse and batted clean up". In a 2018 article, they included "4 da Fam" in their list of the top-100 best Jay-Z songs. John Kennedy of Vulture.com identified the single as an improvement over the track "Pop 4 Roc" from Jay-Z's fourth studio album Vol. 3... Life and Times of S. Carter (1999), and described "4 da Fam" as "the real deal". While critical of Amil, Son Raw of Fact referred to the single as a "prime Roc La Familia-era posse cut".

"4 da Fam" peaked at No. 99 on the Hot R&B/Hip-Hop Songs Billboard chart on July 22, 2000, and remained on the chart for a week. On the same day, it reached a peak position of No. 97 on the R&B/Hip-Hop Streaming Songs Billboard chart, staying on the chart for a week. It also peaked at No. 29 on the Hot Rap Songs Billboard chart, and remained on that chart for 11 weeks.

== Credits and personnel ==
Credits are adapted from the liner notes of All Money Is Legal:

- Featuring – Beanie Sigel, Jay-Z, Memphis Bleek
- Mixed by – Pat Viala
- Producer – Ty Tyfife
- Recorded by – Just Blaze
- Written by – Ty Tyfife, Amil Whitehead, Shawn Carter, Dwight Grant, and Malik Cox

== Charts ==
Chart performance for "4 da Fam"
| Chart (2000) | Peak position |
|---|---|
| US Hot R&B/Hip-Hop Songs (Billboard) | 99 |
| US Hot Rap Songs (Billboard) | 29 |
| US R&B/Hip-Hop Streaming Songs (Billboard) | 97 |

== Release history ==
Release date and format for "4 da Fam"
| Country | Date | Format | Label | Ref. |
|---|---|---|---|---|
| United States | September 13, 2000 | 12-inch single | Roc-A-Fella | |
