= (Always Be My) Sunshine =

Single by Jay-Z featuring Foxy Brown and Babyface

from the album In My Lifetime, Vol. 1
- Released: October 14, 1997
- Recorded: 1997
- Genre: East Coast hip-hop
- Length: 4:43
- Label: Roc-A-Fella; Def Jam
- Songwriters: Shawn Carter; Daven "Prestige" Vanderpool; Daryl Barksdale; Bobby Robinson; Terry Lewis; James Harris III
- Producer: Daven "Prestige" Vanderpool

Jay-Z singles chronology
"Who You Wit" (1997)	"(Always Be My) Sunshine" (1997)	"The City Is Mine" (1998)

Babyface singles chronology
"How Come, How Long" (1997)	"(Always Be My) Sunshine" (1997)	"Fire" (1998)

Foxy Brown singles chronology
"Firm Biz" (1997)	"(Always Be My) Sunshine" (1997)	"Hot Spot" (1998)

Music video
- "(Always Be My) Sunshine" on YouTube

"(Always Be My) Sunshine" is a hip hop song by American rapper Jay-Z with guest vocals from fellow emcee Foxy Brown and R&B singer-songwriter Babyface who performs the song's chorus. It serves as the first single from his second album In My Lifetime, Vol. 1 (1997). The track features production by Daven "Prestige" Vanderpool. Vanderpool samples MC Lyte's "Cha Cha Cha", Alexander O'Neal's "Sunshine", Kraftwerk's "The Man-Machine" and The Fearless Four's "Rockin' It" for the track's beat. In addition, George Fonenette plays keyboards on this song. The song's lyrics helped indicate Jay-Z's change from his Mafioso rap style to a more commercial "shiny suit" style. Steve Juon of RapReviews.com supports the song claiming that it is a less gangsta version of The Notorious B.I.G.'s "Me & My Bitch", a well-received track. Jay-Z cites this song as "what killed the album."

== Music video ==
The music video was directed by Hype Williams. Jay-Z is featured in the video rapping in a room resembling a Rubik's Cube & having a carnival theme to it with Foxy Brown rapping alongside of him. Jay-Z & co-founder of Roc-A-Fella, Damon Dash later regretted doing the video citing that the video wasn't their style.

== Formats and track listings ==
=== CD ===
1. "Sunshine (Radio Edit)" (3:15)
2. "Sunshine (Album Version)" (4:11)
3. "Sunshine (Clean Version)" (4:12)
4. "Sunshine (TV track)" (4:12)
5. "Sunshine (Acappella)" (3:49)

=== Vinyl ===
==== A-side ====
1. "Sunshine (Album Version)"
2. "Sunshine (TV Track)"
3. "Sunshine (Radio Edit)"

==== B-side ====
1. "Sunshine (Clean Version)"
2. "Sunshine (Instrumental)"
3. "Sunshine (Acappella)"

== Charts ==
Chart (1997)	Peak position
Germany (GfK)	18
Netherlands (Dutch Top 40 Tipparade)	9
Netherlands (Single Top 100)	66
New Zealand (Recorded Music NZ)	22
Scottish Singles Sales (Official Charts)	69
Sweden (Sverigetopplistan)	47
UK Hip Hop/R&B (Official Charts)	3
UK Singles (Official Charts)	25
US Billboard Hot 100	95
US Dance Singles Sales (Billboard)	21
US Hot R&B/Hip-Hop Songs (Billboard)	37
US Hot Rap Songs (Billboard)	16

== See also ==
- List of songs recorded by Jay-Z
