= Anything (Jay-Z song) =

Song by Jay-Z

Single by Jay-Z

from the album The Truth and Vol. 3... Life and Times of S. Carter (European version)
- Released: February 15, 2000
- Recorded: 1999
- Genre: East Coast hip hop
- Length: 4:46
- Label: Roc-A-Fella; Def Jam
- Songwriters: Shawn Carter; Lionel Bart
- Producers: Sam Sneed; P. Skam

Jay-Z singles chronology
"Things That U Do" (2000)	"Anything" (2000)	"My Mind Right (Remix)" (2000)

Music video
- "Anything" on YouTube

"Anything" is a song by rapper Jay-Z that is found on Beanie Sigel's 2000 album The Truth. It is produced by Sam Sneed and P. Skam, who sample Lionel Bart's "I'd Do Anything" for the track's beat and chorus. The sample from Oliver! heavily popularized "Anything", as did the Annie sample on "Hard Knock Life (Ghetto Anthem)", "Anything" was also a bonus track on Jay-Z's album Vol. 3... Life and Times of S. Carter (UK/Europe edition) as is "Anything (Mr. Drunk Mix)" on the Japanese version of the album.

Jay-Z admitted to Angie Martinez in a 2009 interview on the BET program Food for Thought that he hoped the song would be a success like "Hard Knock Life (Ghetto Anthem)" due to their similarities but was surprised when it wasn't, even saying "I dropped the record and then nothing". The song did, however, achieve moderate success in the UK, reaching number 18 on the singles chart. A music video for the song was also released, which was directed by Chris Robinson.

== Formats and track listings ==
=== Vinyl 12" ===
==== A-side ====
1. "Anything" (GBZ remix)
2. "Anything" (GBZ remix instrumental)

==== B-side ====
1. "Anything" (DJ Tomekk remix)
2. "Anything" (original version)
3. "Anything" (original version instrumental)

=== CD ===
1. "Anything" (radio edit)
2. "So Ghetto"
3. "There's Been a Murder"
4. "Anything" (Video)

=== Vinyl ===
==== A-side ====
1. "Anything" (radio edit) – 3:47
2. "Anything" (LP version) – 4:47
3. "Anything" (instrumental) – 4:48

==== B-side ====
1. "Big Pimpin'" (radio edit) – 3:56
2. "Big Pimpin'" (LP version) – 4:44
3. "Big Pimpin'" (instrumental) – 4:59

== Charts ==
Chart performance for "Anything"
Chart (2000)	Peak position
Scottish Singles Sales (Official Charts)	31
Sweden (Sverigetopplistan)	56
UK Singles (Official Charts)	18
UK Hip Hop/R&B (Official Charts)	2
US Billboard Hot 100	55
US Hot R&B/Hip-Hop Songs (Billboard)	19
US Hot Rap Songs (Billboard) With "Big Pimpin' "	9
US Rhythmic Airplay (Billboard)	23

== See also ==
- List of songs recorded by Jay-Z
