= The Truth (Beanie Sigel album) =

Studio album by Beanie Sigel
- Released: February 29, 2000
- Recorded: 1999
- Genre: East Coast hip-hop
- Length: 56:51
- Labels: Island Def Jam; Def Jam 2000; Roc-A-Fella
- Producers: Kanye West; Just Blaze; Rockwilder; Buckwild; Bink; Sam Sneed; Robert 'Shim' Kirkland Bernard "Big Demi" Parker; T-Mix; Lofey; J-5; Daven "Prestige" Vanderpool; P. Skam; Shawn Carter (exec.); Damon Dash (exec.); Kareem "Biggs" Burke (exec.)

Beanie Sigel chronology
The Truth (2000)	The Reason (2001)

Singles from The Truth
- 1. "Anything" Released: February 15, 2000

Professional ratings
Review scores
Source	Rating
AllMusic	4/5 stars
Los Angeles Times	3/4 stars
NME	8/10
Q	4/5 stars
Pitchfork	7.8/10
RapReviews	6.0/10
Robert Christgau	(2-star Honorable Mention)
Rolling Stone	4/5 stars
The Source	4.5/5 stars

The Truth is the debut studio album by American rapper Beanie Sigel. Originally scheduled for a Fall 1999 release, it was delayed to a February 8, 2000 release. The album was ultimately released on February 29, 2000, to critical and commercial success. It had one charting single, "Anything" by Jay-Z. Beanie Sigel and his debut album were intensely hyped up after "a few dazzling collaborations" according to Matt Conaway of AllMusic and Conaway says that it "is the culmination of that promise".

This album is known for being the first Roc-A-Fella release to introduce Just Blaze and Kanye West, both who would later become primary producers for artists in the label. Music videos were filmed for "The Truth" and "Remember Them Days".

== Commercial performance ==
The Truth debuted and peaked at number 5 on the US Billboard 200, selling over 155,000 copies in its first week released. The album has been certified Gold by the RIAA for shipping and selling over 695,000 copies in America.

== Track listing ==
The Truth track listing
No.	Title	Writer(s)	Producer	Length
1.	"The Truth"	Dwight Grant; Kanye West; Graham Nash	Kanye West	4:09
2.	"Who Want What" (featuring Memphis Bleek)	Grant; Justin Smith; Malik Cox	Just Blaze	4:15
3.	"Raw & Uncut" (featuring Jay-Z)	Grant; Roosevelt Harrell; Shawn Carter; Sam Taylor	Bink	3:37
4.	"Mac Man"	Grant; Robert Kirkland	Robert 'Shim' Kirkland	4:09
5.	"Playa" (featuring Amil and Jay-Z)	Grant; Tristan Jones; Amil Whitehead; Carter	T-Mix	3:26
6.	"Everybody Wanna Be a Star"	Grant; Bernard Parker; Todd Rundgren; Roger Powell; Kasim Sulton; John Wilcox	Bernard "Big Demi" Parker	4:03
7.	"Remember Them Days" (featuring Eve)	Grant; Michael Sandlofer; Eve Jeffers	Lofey	3:55
8.	"Stop, Chill"	Grant; Dana Stinson	Rockwilder	3:27
9.	"Mac & Brad" (featuring Scarface)	Grant; Johnny Harris; Brad Jordan	J-5	5:06
10.	"What a Thug About"	Grant; Anthony Best	Buckwild	3:59
11.	"What Your Life Like"	Grant; Kirkland; Christopher Young	Robert 'Shim' Kirkland	4:35
12.	"Ride 4 My"	Grant; Harrell	Bink	4:15
13.	"Die"	Grant; Daven Vanderpool	Daven "Prestige" Vanderpool; Eddie Scoresazy	3:10
14.	"Anything" (Jay-Z)	Carter; Samuel Anderson; J. Wright; Lionel Bart	Sam Sneed; P. Skam	4:48
Total length:				56:51

Sample credits

- "The Truth" contains a sample from "Chicago", written and performed by Graham Nash.
- "Raw & Uncut" contains a sample from "Everything Good to You", written by Sam Taylor, and performed by B. T. Express.
- "Everybody Wanna Be a Star" contains a sample from "The Road to Utopia", written by Todd Rundgren, Roger Powell, Kasim Sulton, and John Wilcox; and performed by Utopia.
- "What Ya Life Like" contains a sample from "Hard Rain (Main Title)", written by Christopher Young.
- "Ride 4 My" contains a sample from "The Battle of the Mound", written by Basil Poledouris.
- "Anything" contains a sample from "I'd Do Anything", written by Lionel Bart, from the "Oliver!" Motion Picture Soundtrack Album.

== Personnel ==
- Nafeisa Abdalla – background vocals (6)
- Jeremy Alexander – background vocals (6)
- Kareem "Biggs" Burke – executive producer
- Shawn Carter – executive producer
- Damon Dash – executive producer
- Tony Dawsey – mastering
- Supa Engineer DURO – mixing (1, 2, 4–11, 13, 14)
- Andrew Feluss – assistant mix engineer (14)
- Kyambo "Hip-Hop" Joshua – co-executive producer
- Saadiq Knox – co-executive producer
- Lofey – instrumentation (7)
- Chauncey Mahan – engineer (2–4, 6–14), additional programming (4, 11, 13)
- T-Mix – engineer (5)
- Robert "Real Rolla" Taylor – co-executive producer
- Mike Tyler – guitar (6)
- Pat Viala – engineer (1, 2, 7, 8)
- Douglas Wohlson – mixing (3, 12)

== Charts ==
=== Weekly charts ===
Weekly chart performance for The Truth
Chart (2000)	Peak position
US Billboard 200	5
US Top R&B/Hip-Hop Albums (Billboard)	2

=== Year-end charts ===
Year-end chart performance for The Truth
Chart (2000)	Position
US Billboard 200	178
US Top R&B/Hip-Hop Albums (Billboard)	40

=== Singles ===
Chart performance for singles from The Truth
Year	Song	Chart positions	
Year	Song	US R&B/Hip-Hop	US Rap
2000	"The Truth"	81	23
2000	"Remember Them Days"	69	33

== Certifications ==
Certifications for The Truth
Region	Certification	Certified units/sales
United States (RIAA)	Gold	500,000^{^}
^{^} Shipments figures based on certification alone.
