= The City Is Mine =

Single by Jay-Z featuring Blackstreet

from the album In My Lifetime, Vol. 1
- Released: February 3, 1998
- Recorded: 1997
- Genre: East Coast hip-hop; R&B; jazz rap
- Length: 4:02
- Label: Roc-A-Fella; Def Jam
- Songwriters: Shawn Carter; Teddy Riley; Jack Tempchin; Glenn Frey; Gamble and Huff
- Producer: Teddy Riley

Jay-Z singles chronology
"(Always Be My) Sunshine" (1997)	"The City Is Mine" (1998)	"Be Alone No More" (1998)

Blackstreet singles chronology
"(Money Can't) Buy Me Love" (1997)	"The City Is Mine" (1998)	"Take Me There" (1999)

Music video
- "The City Is Mine" on YouTube

"The City Is Mine" is a song by American rapper Jay-Z, released by Def Jam Recordings and Roc-A-Fella Records on February 3, 1998 as the second single from his second album, In My Lifetime, Vol. 1 (1997). It features vocals from American R&B group Blackstreet and production from its founder and lead member, Teddy Riley. Riley samples "You Gonna Make Me Love Somebody Else" by The Jones Girls for the song's instrumentation, while his group interpolates "You Belong to the City" by Glenn Frey and Jack Tempchin for the song's chorus.

A young Chad Hugo can be heard on saxophone during the track, whose first verse is in memory of his then-recently slain friend and fellow Brooklyn native, the Notorious B.I.G.

== Reception ==
"The City Is Mine" was a moderate commercial success reaching #52 on the Billboard Hot 100 and #38 on the UK Singles Chart. It received mixed reviews from critics who complemented Blackstreet's feature but were overall mixed with the song's nature and its interpolation of Glenn Frey and Jack Tempchin's "You Belong to the City". AllMusic's John Bush considers the beat to be the "most commercial" beat on In My Lifetime, Vol. 1 and the interpolation to be "unfortunate". Steve Juon of RapReviews.com describes that track as "some cotton candy sugary rap FLUFF" and its interpolation as a mistake, but still considers the lyrics to be "vintage Jigga".

== Music video ==
The video directed by Steve Carr was inspired by the 1995 film The Usual Suspects with actor Michael Rapaport portraying the detective interrogating Jay-Z.

== Formats and track listings ==
=== US CD ===
1. "The City Is Mine" (Radio Edit)
2. "The City Is Mine" (TV track)
3. "A Million and One Questions" (Radio Edit)

=== UK CD ===
1. "The City Is Mine" (Radio Edit)
2. "Intro / A Million and One Questions / Rhyme No More" (Premier Radio Edit)
3. "The City Is Mine" (Album Version)
4. "Dead Presidents II"

=== US vinyl ===
==== A-side ====
1. "The City Is Mine" (Radio Edit)
2. "The City Is Mine" (LP Version)

==== B-side ====
1. "The City Is Mine" (TV Track)
2. "A Million and One Questions" (Remix)
3. "A Million and One Questions" (Remix; TV Track)

=== UK vinyl ===
==== A-side ====
1. "The City Is Mine" (Radio Edit)
2. "The City Is Mine" (Dirty Version)
3. "The City Is Mine" (Instrumental)

==== B-side ====
1. "Face Off" (Dirty Version)
2. "Face Off" (Instrumental)

== Charts ==
Chart (1998)	Peak position
US Billboard Hot 100	52
US Hot R&B/Hip-Hop Songs (Billboard)	37
US Hot Rap Songs (Billboard)	14

== See also ==
- List of songs recorded by Jay-Z
