= Sprung (soundtrack) =

Sprung (Music from and Inspired by the Motion Picture)

Soundtrack album to Sprung by various artists
- Released: April 29, 1997
- Recorded: 1996–1997
- Genre: Hip hop; swingbeat
- Length: 75:23
- Label: Qwest; Warner Bros.
- Producer: Andrea Martin; Andrew Smith; Heavy D; Ivan Matias; Keystone; KutMasta Kurt; Marc Kinchen; Minnesota; Mo Stewart; Mr. Dalvin; Mr. Sex; Pras; Quincy Jones; Ralph Hawkins Jr.; Ski Beatz; Stanley Clarke; Studio Ton; Te-Bass; The Whole 9; Timbaland; Tony Dofat

Singles from Sprung (Music from and Inspired by the Motion Picture)
- 1. "Who You Wit" Released: May 20, 1997

Professional ratings
Review scores
Source	Rating
AllMusic	3/5 stars
Los Angeles Times	2/4 stars

Sprung (Music from and Inspired by the Motion Picture) is a soundtrack to Rusty Cundieff's 1997 comedy film Sprung. It was released on April 29, 1997 via Qwest Records and composed of seventeen swingbeat and hip hop music songs.

== Track listing ==
No.	Title	Writer(s)	Producer(s)	Length
1.	"Who You Wit" (performed by Jay-Z)	Shawn Carter; David Willis; Jeffrey Lorber	Ski	4:07
2.	"Let Me Know" (performed by Keystone)	Marc Kinchen; Latrece Kinchen; Londell Smith; Randy Alpert; Andy Armer	Marc Kinchen	4:04
3.	"Group Home Family" (performed by Canibus, Lost Boyz and Panama P.I.)	Germaine Williams; Terrance Kelly; Teddy Cubia; Garfield Duncan	Mr. Sexxx	4:10
4.	"I Don't Know" (performed by Next Level and K-Borne)	Markee Richmond; Arlo Lamont Tate; Howard S. Tate; Reginald Scriven; Samuel L. Tate; Kyle James Miurrelle; John E. Rhone; Ontario Haynes; Maurice Stewart; Grover Washington Jr.	The Whole 9; Moe ZMD	3:45
5.	"Move on (I'm Leaving)" (performed by John Forté and Pras)	John Forté; Prakazrel Michel; Nicole Renee; Monte Moir	Pras; Te-Bass	3:54
6.	"If It Ain't Love" (performed by Keystone)	Tyrone Taylor; Will Gardener	Keystone; Sasho Mase (co.); Steve Drakeem (co.)	3:50
7.	"One in a Million (Remix)" (performed by Aaliyah and Ginuwine)	Melissa Elliott; Timothy Mosley	Timbaland	5:07
8.	"I Still Love You" (performed by Monifah)	Frederick Lee Drakeford; Dwight Myers; Tony Dofat	Heavy D; Tony Dofat	4:03
9.	"Since You've Gone Away (The Lockdown Anthem)" (performed by Bonnie & Clyde)	Andrea Martin; Ivan Matias; Albert Johnson; Kejuan Muchita	Andrea Martin; Ivan Matias	4:26
10.	"2 Nite's the Nite" (performed by Mr. Dalvin and Marquee)	Dalvin DeGrate; Markita Ferguson	Mr. Dalvin	4:02
11.	"Goal Tendin'" (performed by E-40)	Earl Stevens; Marvin Whitemon	Studio Ton	3:40
12.	"Freak" (performed by Money Boss Players)	Eddie Faison; Allan Hendricks; Sean Hamilton; Mark Richardson; Martin Holt; Basil Tweedy	Minnesota	4:48
13.	"Let's Get It Started" (performed by G-Ratz)	Saadi Davis; Terrell Emanuel; Julian Walters; James "Pookie" Gist; Andrew Smith; James Calloway; Aaron Davenport; Leroy Burgess	Andrew Smith	4:16
14.	"Bounce" (performed by Noggin' Nodders)	Paul Laster; Kurt Matlin; George Clinton; William Collins; Garry Shider; Alphonse Mouzon	KutMasta Kurt	4:00
15.	"Don't Ask My Neighbors" (performed by Tisha Campbell and Tichina Arnold)	Skip Scarborough	Ralph Hawkins, Jr.; James "Timbali" Cornwell (co.); Stan Jones (co.)	5:43
16.	"The Secret Garden" (performed by Quincy Jones)	Quincy Jones; Siedah Garrett; Rod Temperton; Eldra Patrick DeBarge	Quincy Jones	6:40
17.	"I Want Your Love" (performed by Stanley Clarke)	Stanley Clarke; Vito A. Colapietro II; Neely Dinkins Jr.; S. Gonder; C. Clarke	Stanley Clarke	4:48
Total length:				1:15:23

== Charts ==
=== Weekly charts ===
Chart (1997)	Peak position
US Billboard 200	89
US Top R&B/Hip-Hop Albums (Billboard)	9

=== Year-end charts ===
Chart (1997)	Position
US Top R&B/Hip-Hop Albums (Billboard)	97
