= Who You Wit =

Single by Jay-Z

from the album Sprung (Music from and Inspired by the Motion Picture) & In My Lifetime, Vol. 1
- Released: May 20, 1997
- Recorded: 1996
- Genre: East Coast hip-hop
- Length: 4:07
- Label: Qwest; Warner Bros.
- Songwriters: Shawn Carter; David Willis; Jeff Lorber
- Producer: Ski

Jay-Z singles chronology
"Feelin' It" (1997)	"Who You Wit" (1997)	"(Always Be My) Sunshine" (1997)

Music video
- "Who You Wit" on YouTube

"Who You Wit" is a 1997 single by rapper Jay-Z that is produced by Ski. It was released in promotion of the 1997 comedy film Sprung and appears on its soundtrack, Sprung (Music from and Inspired by the Motion Picture). Its beat samples "Night Love" by the Jeff Lorber Fusion.

A track named "Who You Wit II" appears on Jay-Z's second album In My Lifetime, Vol. 1. It features the same beat, but adds an additional verse that the original version lacked.

== Formats and track listings ==
=== CD ===
1. "Who You Wit (Clean Version)" (4:05)
2. "Who You Wit (Album Version)" (4:07)
3. "Who You Wit (Instrumental Version)" (4:07)
4. "Who You Wit (A Cappella Clean Version)" (3:58)

=== Vinyl ===
==== A-Side ====
1. "Who You Wit (Album Version)" (4:07)
2. "Who You Wit (A Cappella)" (3:58)

==== B-Side ====
1. "Who You Wit (Clean Version)" (4:07)
2. "Who You Wit (Instrumental)" (4:08)

== Charts ==
=== Weekly charts ===
Chart (1997)	Peak position
US Billboard Hot 100	84
US Hot R&B/Hip-Hop Songs (Billboard)	25
US Hot Rap Songs (Billboard)	18

== See also ==
- List of songs recorded by Jay-Z
