= Big Pimpin' =

Single by Jay-Z featuring UGK

from the album Vol. 3... Life and Times of S. Carter
- Released: April 11 2000
- Recorded: 1999
- Genre: Southern hip-hop
- Length: 4:44
- Label: Roc-A-Fella; Def Jam
- Songwriters: Shawn Carter; Bernard Freeman; Chad Butler; Timothy Mosley; Kyambo Joshua; Baligh Hamdi
- Producer: Timbaland

Jay-Z singles chronology
"Anything" (2000)	"Big Pimpin'" (2000)	"Hey Papi" (2000)

UGK singles chronology
"Sippin' on Some Syrup" (2000)	"Big Pimpin'" (2000)	"Let Me See It" (2001)

Music video
- "Big Pimpin' ft. UGK" on YouTube

"Big Pimpin'" is a song by American rapper Jay-Z. It was released in 2000 as the third and final single from his fourth studio album Vol. 3... Life and Times of S. Carter (1999). It features a guest appearance from Southern hip hop duo UGK and production from Timbaland.

== Sampling controversy ==
"Big Pimpin'" contains a sample of "Khosara Khosara", performed by Egyptian vocalist Abdel Halim Hafez and originally composed by prominent Egyptian composer Baligh Hamdi in 1957. In 2007, Hamdi's relative Osama Ahmed Fahmy filed a lawsuit in Los Angeles Federal Court alleging that producer Timbaland's use of the track was unlicensed, while its use of a sampled loop, instead of the full unaltered track, violated Hamdi's "moral rights". He additionally claimed that Jay-Z needed permission from each of Hamdi's four children to use the track, as they owned its copyright after Hamdi's death in 1993. That same year, a 2005 lawsuit filed by Ahab Joseph Nafal, who claimed "Big Pimpin'" infringed the copyright on "Khosara Khosara", was dismissed.

In 2011 a California federal judge ruled that Fahmy could proceed with his suit, with Jay-Z, Timbaland, Linkin Park and EMI Records among the defendants named. Linkin Park was included because the track was mashed up with the single "Papercut" from their 2004 EP Collision Course, a collaboration with Jay-Z. Lawyers for EMI Records argued the then-50-year-old track was governed by the 1909 Copyright Act. Jay-Z testified four years later that he was unaware his song contained a sample of "Khosara Khosara", and when asked why he did not check the rights to its use, he replied, "That’s not what I do. I make music." Lawyers for Jay-Z and Timbaland claimed that Hamdi's family had been paid for the sample. On May 31, 2018, the Ninth Circuit Court of Appeals affirmed the district court's grant of summary judgment in favor of Jay-Z, et al.

== Music video ==
The music video was shot in Trinidad during its Carnival, and features Jay-Z and Bun B on a music truck dispensing money into the crowd and partying on a lavish yacht. Due to Pimp C's refusal to fly to Trinidad, his verse and the video's closing scenes were filmed in Miami Beach, Florida. Melyssa Ford and video model Liza Rivera make cameo appearances.

== Reception ==
"Big Pimpin'" was the most successful single from Vol. 3... Life and Times of S. Carter, peaking at #18 on the Billboard Hot 100 and topping the Rhythmic Top 40 chart while achieving platinum status. Rolling Stone ranked the track #467 on its 2004 selection of "The 500 Greatest Songs of All Time". However, Jay-Z said to The Wall Street Journal in 2010 that he regretted the song's lyrics. "Some [lyrics] become really profound when you see them in writing. Not 'Big Pimpin'. That's the exception. It was like, 'I can't believe I said that. And kept saying it. What kind of animal would say this sort of thing?' Reading it is really harsh."

== Formats and track listings ==
=== CD ===
1. "Big Pimpin' (Radio Edit)"
2. "Watch Me (LP Version)"
3. "Big Pimpin' (Instrumental)"
4. "Big Pimpin' (Video)"

=== Vinyl ===
==== A-side ====
1. "Big Pimpin' (Album Version)" (4:05)

==== B-side ====
1. "Watch Me (LP Version)" (4:34)
2. "Big Pimpin' (Instrumental)" (4:57)

== Charts ==
=== Weekly charts ===
Chart (2000)	Peak position
Scottish Singles Sales (Official Charts)	46
UK Singles (Official Charts)	29
UK Dance (Official Charts)	7
UK Hip Hop/R&B (Official Charts)	7
US Billboard Hot 100	18
US Hot R&B/Hip-Hop Songs (Billboard)	6
US Hot Rap Songs (Billboard)	9
US Rhythmic Airplay (Billboard)	1

=== Year-end charts ===
Chart (2000)	Position
US Billboard Hot 100	60
US Hot R&B/Hip-Hop Songs (Billboard)	38

== Certifications ==
Region	Certification	Certified units/sales
New Zealand (RMNZ)	Gold	15,000^{‡}
United Kingdom (BPI)	Gold	400,000^{‡}
United States (RIAA)	3× Platinum	3,000,000^{‡}
^{‡} Sales+streaming figures based on certification alone.

== See also ==
- List of songs recorded by Jay-Z
