= Things That U Do =

Single by Jay-Z featuring Mariah Carey

from the album Vol. 3... Life and Times of S. Carter
- Released: January 11, 2000
- Recorded: 1999
- Studio: Sony Music Studios (New York, NY)
- Genre: East Coast hip hop; R&B
- Length: 4:52
- Label: Roc-A-Fella; Def Jam
- Songwriters: Shawn Carter; Kasseem Dean
- Producer: Swizz Beatz

Jay-Z singles chronology
"Do It Again (Put Ya Hands Up)" (1999)	"Things That U Do" (2000)	"Anything" (2000)

Mariah Carey singles chronology
"Thank God I Found You" (1999)	"Things That U Do" (2000)	"Can't Take That Away (Mariah's Theme)" (2000)

Audio video
- "Things That U Do" on YouTube

"Things That U Do" is the second single from rapper Jay-Z's 1999 album Vol. 3... Life and Times of S. Carter. It features guest vocals by Mariah Carey and a beat produced by Swizz Beatz. AllMusic's John Bush describes it as an "overblown production," while Steve Juon of RapReviews.com considers it a "commercially aimed song" that "still sounds fresh and original." It was neither heavily promoted nor released as a CD single, causing it to chart lowly.

== Critical reception ==
AllMusic editor John Bush described this song's production is "overblown." Rolling Stone's Kris Ex wrote: "Far be it from me to question Allah's wisdom," he (Jay Z) rhymes on the Mariah Carey-assisted, Swizz Beatz-produced "Things That U Do." "I dodged prison, came out unscathed from car collisions/I know I must be part of some mission."

== Charts ==
Chart (2000)	Peak position
US Billboard Bubbling Under R&B/Hip-Hop Singles	20

== Release history ==
Country	Date	Format	Label
United States	February 15, 2000	12-inch single	Roc-A-Fella, Def Jam
