= In My Lifetime, Vol. 1 =

Studio album by Jay-Z
- Released: November 4, 1997
- Recorded: 1996–1997
- Studios: D&D Studios; Daddy's House; Soundtrack Studios; (New York City); Future Recording Studios (Virginia Beach)
- Genre: Hip-hop
- Length: 58:00
- Labels: Roc-A-Fella; Def Jam
- Producers: Ron "Amen-Ra" Lawrence; Big Jaz; DJ Premier; Buckwild; Deric "D-Dot" Angelettie; Anthony Dent; Nashiem Myrick; Poke and Tone; Teddy Riley; Ski; Stevie J; Daven "Prestige" Vanderpool; Sean "Puffy" Combs

Jay-Z chronology
Reasonable Doubt (1996)	In My Lifetime, Vol. 1 (1997)	Vol. 2... Hard Knock Life (1998)

Singles from In My Lifetime, Vol. 1
- 1. "(Always Be My) Sunshine" Released: October 14, 1997; 2. "The City Is Mine" Released: February 3, 1998; 3. "Wishing on a Star" Released: March 11, 1998

In My Lifetime, Vol. 1 is the second studio album by American rapper Jay-Z. It was released on November 4, 1997, by Roc-A-Fella Records and Def Jam Recordings. The album debuted at number three on the US Billboard 200 chart and was certified Platinum by the RIAA, selling over 138,000 copies in its first week of release. In My Lifetime, Vol. 1 also served as Jay-Z's first album release following the sudden death of fellow Brooklyn rapper and collaborator The Notorious B.I.G. in March 1997.

== Production ==
The album features guest contributions by Lil' Kim, Foxy Brown, Babyface, Blackstreet, Teddy Riley, Too $hort, Sauce Money and Puff Daddy. Producers for Reasonable Doubt such as DJ Premier and Ski contribute to a limited number of beats on this album, though the majority of the production is handled by Puff Daddy's production team The Hitmen from the Bad Boy label, giving the album a generally glossier sound than its predecessor. It displayed a shift from the mafioso rap themes of Reasonable Doubt to the so-called "jiggy" era of late 90s hip-hop, often credited to videos and albums from Puff Daddy and his Bad Boy record label's roster of artists including The Notorious B.I.G. (the first two singles from his second album were both huge pop hits) and Mase. "Reasonable Doubt was like an introduction," Jay-Z told MTV News. "Like, you know, meeting somebody out on the street... Everything, your whole conversation is very general, not too much detail and things like that. Its just that 'In My Lifetime' is more detailed, more in-depth. Much more personal".

== Influence of the Notorious B.I.G. ==
In a 1998 interview with MTV News, Jay-Z explained how the death of fellow Brooklyn rapper and collaborator The Notorious B.I.G. shaped parts of In My Lifetime, Vol. 1. In the interview, he explained how the album was not as fun to record as his debut, (Reasonable Doubt (1996)), and that certain tracks, such as "The City is Mine", were influenced by the rapper's death.

A lot of different songs were influenced by what was happening. 'City Is Mine', the first verse, you could just hear it. I think two hooks on there came from songs that he (The Notorious B.I.G.) had previously recorded...The album to me — this album wasn't fun to me like Reasonable Doubt, because it was like, it seemed really slow to me, and I didn't set out to do that, just looking back now and listening to it now.

— Jay-Z, MTV News

== Critical reception ==
Professional ratings
Review scores
Source	Rating
AllMusic	4.5/5 stars
Chicago Tribune	3/4 stars
Christgau's Consumer Guide	(2-star Honorable Mention)
Encyclopedia of Popular Music	4/5 stars
Entertainment Weekly	B+
NME	6/10
Pitchfork	8.4/10
The Rolling Stone Album Guide	3.5/5 stars
The Source	4/5 stars
Spin	5/10
USA Today	3/4 stars

In a contemporary review, Steve Jones of USA Today called In My Lifetime "a rock-solid set with both street and pop appeal". Chicago Tribune critic Soren Baker believed Jay-Z's lyrics "contain a finesse and insight few can articulate as succinctly", while writing that "his use of pop producers Teddy Riley and Sean 'Puffy' Combs will alienate listeners, even as Jay-Z establishes himself as that rare underground rhymer with commercial appeal". Robert Christgau gave the album a two-star honorable mention in his 2000 Consumer Guide book, indicating a "likable effort consumers attuned to its overriding aesthetic or individual vision may well enjoy". He named "(Always Be My) Sunshine" and "Real Niggaz" as highlights while calling Jay-Z "arrogant yet diffident, ruthless yet cute—a scary original". Chris Norris of Spin said Jay-Z's raps are often "in search of meaty ideas or distinctive charm—skills without pleasure", and was also critical of the production. "Without one sure, guiding vision," Norris wrote, "the Combs blueprint comes off as either mundane or embarrassing".

AllMusic editor John Bush wrote in a retrospective review, "Though the productions are just a bit flashier and more commercial than on his debut, Jay-Z remained the tough street rapper, and even improved a bit on his flow". According to Bush, he "struts the line between project poet and up-and-coming player" while balancing "both personas with the best rapping heard in the rap game since the deaths of 2Pac and Notorious B.I.G.".

== Track listing ==
No.	Title	Writer(s)	Producer(s)	Length
1.	"Intro / A Million and One Questions / Rhyme No More"	Shawn Carter; Christopher Martin	DJ Premier	3:21
2.	"The City Is Mine" (featuring Blackstreet)	Carter; Teddy Riley; Kenneth Gamble; Leon A. Huff; Glenn Frey; Jack Tempchin	Riley	4:02
3.	"I Know What Girls Like" (featuring Puff Daddy and Lil' Kim)	Carter; Sean Combs; Ron Lawrence; Kimberly Jones; Timothy Moore; Gary Cooper; Joseph Malloy; William Stronman; Rudy Shereff; David Spradley; Chris Butler	Puffy; Amen-Ra	4:50
4.	"Imaginary Players"	Carter; Daven Vanderpool; René Moore; Angela Winbush; Herman Chainey	Prestige	3:57
5.	"Streets Is Watching"	Carter; David Willis; Labi Siffre	Ski	3:58
6.	"Friend or Foe '98"	Carter; Martin	DJ Premier	2:09
7.	"Lucky Me"	Carter; Anthony Best; Steven Jordan; Karen Anderson	Stevie J; Buckwild	5:00
8.	"(Always Be My) Sunshine" (featuring Babyface and Foxy Brown)	Carter; Vanderpool; Darryll Barksdale; Bobby Robinson; James Harris III; Terry Lewis	Prestige	4:43
9.	"Who You Wit II"	Carter; Willis; Jeff Lorber	Ski	4:29
10.	"Face Off" (featuring Sauce Money)	Carter; Todd Gaither; Jean-Claude Olivier; Samuel Barnes; Manu Dibango	Trackmasters	3:31
11.	"Real Niggaz" (featuring Too $hort)	Carter; Todd Shaw; Anthony Dent	Dent	5:07
12.	"Rap Game / Crack Game"	Carter; Jonathan Burks; Marvin Pierce; Marshall Jones; Ralph Middlebrooks; Leroy Bonner; James Williams; Clarence Satchell; Billy Beck; Martin; Nasir Jones; Antwan Patton; André Benjamin; Organized Noize	Big Jaz	2:40
13.	"Where I'm From"	Carter; Deric Angelettie; Ron Lawrence; Norman Whitfield	Amen-Ra; D-Dot	4:26
14.	"You Must Love Me"	Carter; Nashiem Myrick; Walter Sigler; Ron Tyson	Myrick	5:47

UK/Europe bonus tracks
No.	Title	Producer(s)	Length
15.	"Wishing on a Star" (D'Influence Remix)	D'Influence	5:54
16.	"Wishing on a Star" (Trackmasters Remix)	Trackmasters	3:55

=== Samples ===
- "Intro / A Million and One Questions / Rhyme No More" contains samples of:
  - "Let Me Go", performed by Latimore.
  - "One in a Million", performed by Aaliyah.
  - "Don't Let Me Be Lonely Tonight", performed by Issac Hayes.
- "The City Is Mine" contains a sample of "You Gonna Make Me Love Somebody Else", performed by The Jones Girls, as well as an interpolation of "You Belong to the City", performed by Glenn Frey.
- "I Know What Girls Like" contains a sample of "A Fly Girl", performed by Boogie Boys, as well as an interpolation of "I Know What Boys Like", performed by The Waitresses.
- "Imaginary Players" contains a sample of "Imaginary Playmates", performed by René & Angela.
- "Streets Is Watching" contains a sample of "I Got The...", performed by Labi Siffre.
- "Friend or Foe '98" contains a sample of "Car of Love", performed by The Main Ingredient.
- "(Always Be My) Sunshine" contains a sample of "Rockin' It", performed by The Fearless Four, as well as an interpolation of "Sunshine", performed by Alexander O'Neal.
- "Who You Wit II" contains a sample of "Night Love", performed by The Jeff Lorber Fusion.
- "Face Off" contains a sample of "Soul Makossa", performed by Manu Dibango.
- "Rap Game / Crack Game" contains samples of:
  - "Fopp", performed by Ohio Players.
  - "Represent", performed by Nas.
  - "Myintrotoletuknow", performed by Outkast.
- "Where I'm From" contains a sample of "Let Your Hair Down", performed by Yvonne Fair.
- "You Must Love Me" contains a sample of "What Am I Waiting For", performed by The O'Jays.
- "Wishing on a Star" contains a sample of "Wishing on a Star", performed by Rose Royce.

== Personnel ==
- Karen Anderson – vocals
- Deric "D-Dot" Angelettie – producer
- Babyface – performer
- Big Jaz – producer
- Blackstreet – performer
- Buckwild – producer
- Kareem "Biggs" Burke – executive producer
- Sean "Puffy" Combs – performer, producer
- Lane Craven – engineer, mixing
- Commissioner Gordon – mixing
- DJ Premier – producer, scratching
- Damon Dash – executive producer
- Anthony Dent – producer
- Earth – background vocals
- Paul J. Falcone – engineer
- George Fontenette – keyboards
- Foxy Brown – performer
- Serban Ghenea – engineer, mixing
- Chad Hugo – saxophone
- Stevie J – producer
- Jay-Z – primary artist, executive producer
- Ron "Amen-Ra" Lawrence – producer
- Lil' Kim – performer
- Jonathan Mannion – photography
- Glen Marchese – engineer
- Tony Maserati – mixing
- George Meyers – engineer, mixing
- Nashiem Myrick – producer
- Michael Patterson – engineer, mixing
- Herb Powers – mastering
- Kelly Price – vocals
- Joe Quinde – engineer, mixing
- Teddy Riley – producer, engineer, mixing
- Robin – engineer
- Eddie Sancho – engineer, mixing
- Sauce Money – performer
- Ski – producer
- Taj – engineer
- Too Short – performer
- Trackmasters – producer
- Richard Travali – mixing
- Daven "Prestige" Vanderpool – producer
- Doug Wilson – engineer, mixing

== Charts ==
=== Weekly charts ===
Chart (1997)	Peak position
UK Albums (Official Charts)	78
US Billboard 200	3
US Top R&B/Hip-Hop Albums (Billboard)	2

=== Year-end charts ===
Chart (1997)	Position
US Top R&B/Hip-Hop Albums (Billboard)	85
Chart (1998)	Position
US Billboard 200	150
US Top R&B/Hip-Hop Albums (Billboard)	36

=== Singles ===
Year	Song	Billboard Hot 100	Hot R&B/Hip-Hop Singles & Tracks	Hot Rap Singles
1997	"Who You Wit"	#84	#25	#18
1997	"(Always Be My) Sunshine"	#95	#37	#16
1998	"The City Is Mine"	#52	#37	#14

== Certifications ==
Region	Certification	Certified units/sales
United Kingdom (BPI)	Silver	60,000^{‡}
United States (RIAA)	Platinum	1,000,000^{^}
^{^} Shipments figures based on certification alone.^{‡} Sales+streaming figures based on certification alone.
