= The Corruptor (soundtrack) =

The Corruptor: The Soundtrack

Soundtrack album by various artists
- Released: February 23, 1999
- Recorded: 1998–99
- Studio: Unique Recording Studios (New York, NY)
- Genre: Hip hop
- Length: 1:11:15
- Label: Jive Records
- Producer: Dana Sano (exec.); Lori Silfen (exec.); Toby Emmerich (exec.); Dame Grease; Erick Sermon; Pimp C; Dave Mezee; Daven "Prestige" Vanderpool; DJ Battlecat; Havoc; Marley Marl; Mike "Mr. Fortune" Fortunato; Night & Day; Omar "Amarreto" Glover; Swizz Beatz; The Legendary Traxster; Tony "T-Lo" Aviles; William "Ill Will" Broady; Yogi "Sugar Bear" Graham

Singles from The Corruptor: The Soundtrack
- 1. "5 Boroughs" Released: 1998; 2. "More Money, More Cash, More Hoes (Remix)" Released: February 23, 1999; 3. "Take It Off" Released: 1999

Professional ratings
Review scores
Source	Rating
AllMusic	3/5 stars
RapReviews	7.5/10

The Corruptor: The Soundtrack is a soundtrack to James Foley's 1999 action film The Corruptor. It was released on February 23, 1999, via Jive Records, composed of 17 original songs. Production was handled by Dame Grease, Erick Sermon, Pimp C, Dave Mezee, Daven "Prestige" Vanderpool, DJ Battlecat, Havoc, Marley Marl, Mike "Mr. Fortune" Fortunato, Night & Day, Omar "Amarreto" Glover, Swizz Beatz, The Legendary Traxster, Tony "T-Lo" Aviles, William "Ill Will" Broady and Yogi "Sugar Bear" Graham, with Dana Sano, Lori Silfen and Toby Emmerich serving as executive producers.

It features contributions from Keith Murray, UGK, Mobb Deep, Beanie Sigel, Big Stan, B-Legit, Bounty Killer, Buckshot, Caffeine, Cam'ron, DMX, E-40, Jane Blaze, Jay-Z, Kasino, Killah Priest, KRS-One, Memphis Bleek, Mic Vandalz, Mil, Mystikal, Night & Day, Redman, Rev. Run, Sauce Money, Spice 1, The L.O.X., Too $hort, Truck Turner, Vigilante and Carter Burwell.

The album peaked at number 44 on the Billboard 200 and at number 9 on the Top R&B Albums charts in the United States.

Carter Burwell's score album entitled The Corruptor (Original Motion Picture Score) was recorded at Right Track Studio in New York and released on March 9, 1999, via Varèse Sarabande.

== Track listing ==
The Corruptor: The Soundtrack
No.	Title	Writer(s)	Producer(s)	Length
1.	"More Money, More Cash, More Hoes (Remix)" (performed by Jay-Z, Beanie Sigel, Memphis Bleek and DMX)	Shawn Carter; Earl Simmons; Kasseem Dean	Swizz Beatz	4:08
2.	"The Corruptor's Execution" (performed by E-40, B-Legit and UGK)	Chad Butler; Bernard Freeman; Earl Stevens; Brandt Jones; George Clinton; Isaac Hayes; Gregory Hutchison	Pimp C	4:14
3.	"5 Boroughs" (performed by KRS-One, Bounty Killer, Buckshot, Cam'ron, Keith Murray, Killah Priest, Prodigy, Redman, Run and Vigilante)	Lawrence Parker; Keith Murray; Joseph Simmons; Cameron Giles; Reginald Noble; Kenyatta Blake; Albert Johnson; Walter Reed; Jeremy A. Graham; William Broady; Ryan Corwin	Yogi Bear; Ill Will Furton	4:44
4.	"Take It Off" (performed by UGK)	Butler; Freeman; Barry White	Pimp C	3:31
5.	"Slow Down" (performed by Jane Blaze and Sauce Money)	Tasha Knight-Williams; Todd Gaither; Daven Vanderpool; Willie Hutch	Daven "Prestige" Vanderpool	4:05
6.	"I Ain't Playin'" (performed by Mystikal)	Michael Tyler; Samuel Lindley	The Legendary Traxster	4:20
7.	"Allustrious" (performed by Mobb Deep)	Johnson; Kejuan Muchita	Havoc	4:30
8.	"Have You Heard of Me?" (performed by Murda Mil)	Jaa'mal E. Smith; Omar Glover; Anthony Aviles; Michael Fortunato	Armaretto; T-Lo; Mr. Fortune	4:17
9.	"What You Think All the Guns Is For?" (performed by Truck Turner)	D. McKay; Marlon Williams; Christopher Wallace; Osten Harvey; Hal David; Burt Bacharach	Marley Marl	4:21
10.	"Good Girl Goes Bad" (performed by Spice 1)	Robert Lee Green Jr.; D. Meters; Beth Thompson	Dave Mezze	4:41
11.	"Men of Respect" (performed by Kasino and The Lox)	Kimani Davis; David Styles; Sean Jacobs; Jason Phillips; Damon Blackman	Dame Grease	4:47
12.	"Be My Dirty Love" (performed by Too $hort)	Todd Shaw; Erick Sermon	Erick Sermon	4:03
13.	"Slap Somebody" (performed by Keith Murray)	Murray; Sermon	Erick Sermon	3:57
14.	"Feel the Rush" (performed by Mic Vandalz, Kasino and Big Stan)	Stanley Griffith; Sharrief Kariem Bouchet; Tommie M. Hooks; Davis; Dennis Lamont Joyner; Blackman	Dame Grease	4:12
15.	"Reminisce" (performed by Caffeine)	Samual Monroe Jr.	DJ Battlecat	3:59
16.	"I Got You Faded" (performed by Night & Day)	Gasner Allen Hughes; Tonyatta P. Martinez	Night & Day	4:30
17.	"The Corruptor (Main Title)" (performed by Carter Burwell)	Carter Burwell		2:56
Total length:				1:11:15

Sample credits

- Track 2 contains a sample "Another Execution" by Above The Law
- Track 4 contains a sample of "Love Serenade" by Barry White
- Track 5 contains a sample of "Street Tough Livin' On The City" by Willie Hutch
- Track 9 contains a sample of "Warning" by Notorious B.I.G. and "Hell On Earth" by Mobb Deep

== Charts ==
Chart (1999)	Peak position
US Billboard 200	44
US Top R&B Albums (Billboard)	9
