= Vol. 3... Life and Times of S. Carter =

Studio album by Jay-Z
- Released: December 28, 1999
- Recorded: 1999
- Studios: Baseline Studios (New York City); The Hit Factory (New York City); D&D Studios (New York City); Sony Music Studios (New York City); Manhattan Center Studio (New York City); Quad Studios (New York City)
- Genre: Hip-hop
- Length: 71:05
- Labels: Roc-A-Fella; Def Jam 2000
- Producers: Darrell "Digga" Branch; Clue; DJ Premier; DURO; Irv Gotti; K Rob; Lil Rob; Chauncey Mahan; P. Skam; Rockwilder; Russell "Russ" Howard; Sean "SAF" Francis; Sam Sneed; Swizz Beatz; Timbaland; Lance Rivera

Jay-Z chronology
Vol. 2... Hard Knock Life (1998)	Vol. 3... Life and Times of S. Carter (1999)	The Dynasty: Roc La Familia (2000)

Singles from Vol. 3... Life and Times of S. Carter
- 1. "Do It Again (Put Ya Hands Up)" Released: December 14, 1999; 2. "Things That U Do" Released: January 11, 2000; 3. "Anything" Released: February 15, 2000; 4. "Big Pimpin'" Released: April 11, 2000

Vol. 3... Life and Times of S. Carter is the fourth studio album by American rapper Jay-Z. It was released on December 28, 1999, by Roc-A-Fella Records and Def Jam Recordings. According to USA Today critic Steve Jones, the record marked a return to the street-oriented sound of Jay-Z's 1996 debut album, Reasonable Doubt. Vol. 3... featured guest appearances from Amil, Beanie Sigel, Mariah Carey, Juvenile, Memphis Bleek, Dr. Dre and UGK, with production from Swizz Beatz, Timbaland, K-Rob, DJ Clue, Rockwilder, DJ Premier, and Irv Gotti, among others.

The album was well received by critics and debuted at number one on the Billboard 200, selling 462,000 copies in its first week. It has since sold over three million copies and been certified triple platinum by the Recording Industry Association of America.

== Release and reception ==
Professional ratings
Review scores
Source	Rating
AllMusic	3/5 stars
Chicago Tribune	3/4 stars
Encyclopedia of Popular Music	4/5 stars
Entertainment Weekly	A−
Los Angeles Times	2.5/4 stars
NME	7/10
Rolling Stone	4/5 stars
The Source	4/5 stars
USA Today	4/4 stars
The Village Voice	A

Vol. 3... was released on December 28, 1999, and sold 462,000 copies in its first week, while debuting at number one on the Billboard 200. The sales week was thirty-percent more than the first-week sales of Jay-Z's previous album, Vol. 2... Hard Knock Life (1998). On February 14, 2001, it was certified triple platinum by the Recording Industry Association of America (RIAA). In 2009, the album reached sales of 3,093,000 copies, according to Nielsen SoundScan.

In a contemporary review, Rolling Stone critic Kris Ex wrote that Jay-Z "has become a better architect of songs" while hailing Vol. 3... as "his strongest album to date, with music that's filled with catchy hooks, rump-shaking beats and lyrics fueled by Jay's hustler's vigilance". Richard Harrington from The Washington Post found the record to be "full of reputation-building swagger, cataloguing of lyrical skills and autobiographical perspective". Reviewing the album in Entertainment Weekly, Anthony DeCurtis said it reconnects with Jay-Z's urban demographic, "with flair", while Steve Jones of USA Today was particularly impressed by his lyrics and flow, finding both to be "razor-sharp as ever". In The Village Voice, Robert Christgau argued that Jay-Z has too much at stake commercially to depart from "playing the now-a-rapper-now-a-thug 'reality' game with his customers, thugs and fantasists both", but he impresses with "a rugged, expansive vigor, nailing both come-fly-with-me cosmopolitanism and the hunger for excitement that's turned gangster hangouts into musical hotbeds from Buenos Aires to Kansas City". Fellow Voice critic Miles Marshall Lewis called Jay-Z "the best MC in hip hop" and Vol. 3… "the quintessential 2000-model hip hop album". Soren Baker was less impressed in the Los Angeles Times, writing that the record lacks the "biting humor and spectacular wordplay" of his previous albums.

Christgau ranked Vol. 3... number 13 on his "Dean's List" for The Village Voice's Pazz & Jop critics' poll of 1999. In The Rolling Stone Album Guide (2004), Jon Caramanica later wrote, "Life & Times of S. Carter took [Vol. 2's] combination of style and substance to its apotheosis. In addition to maintaining a strong lyrical presence, Jay also showcased his talents as a master of flow, changing cadences and rhyme patterns with impressive regularity and flexibility ... Nearly every track on this album was sonically unique, and Jay rode each one with aplomb and skill". AllMusic's John Bush wrote in a retrospective review that a couple of overwrought productions ("Dope Man" and "Things That U Do") keep it from being among Jay-Z's best albums.

== Track listing ==
Vol. 3... Life and Times of S. Carter track listing
No.	Title	Writer(s)	Producer(s)	Length
1.	"Hova Song (Intro)"	Shawn Carter; K Rob; Jimi Hendrix	K Rob	2:21
2.	"So Ghetto"	Carter; Christopher Martin; Steve Cropper; Buddy Miles	DJ Premier	4:01
3.	"Do It Again (Put Ya Hands Up)" (featuring Amil and Beanie Sigel)	Carter; Amil Whitehead; Dwight Grant; Dana Stinson; Kyambo Joshua	Rockwilder	4:39
4.	"Dope Man"	Carter; Ernesto Shaw; Ken Ifill; Darrell "Digga" Branch	Clue; DURO; Digga; Lance "UN" Rivera^{[a]}; Chauncey Mahan^{[b]}	4:03
5.	"Things That U Do" (featuring Mariah Carey)	Carter; Mariah Carey; Kasseem Dean; Joshua	Swizz Beatz	4:52
6.	"It's Hot (Some Like It Hot)"	Carter; Timothy Mosley	Timbaland	4:16
7.	"Snoopy Track" (featuring Juvenile)	Carter; Terius Gray; Mosley	Timbaland	4:01
8.	"S. Carter" (featuring Amil)	Carter; Whitehead; Russell "Russ" Howard; Sean "SAF" Francis	Russ; SAF; Mahan^{[b]}	4:14
9.	"Pop 4 Roc" (featuring Beanie Sigel, Memphis Bleek, and Amil)	Carter; Grant; Malik Cox; Whitehead; Shaw; Ifill	Clue; DURO	4:36
10.	"Watch Me" (featuring Dr. Dre)	Carter; Andre Young; Irving Lorenzo; Robert Mays	Irv Gotti; Lil Rob	4:34
11.	"Big Pimpin'" (featuring UGK)	Carter; Chad Butler; Bernard Freeman; Mosley	Timbaland	4:44
12.	"There's Been a Murder"	Carter; Howard; Francis; Alana Davis	Russ; SAF; Mahan^{[b]}	3:40
13.	"Come and Get Me"	Carter; Mosley	Timbaland	6:09
14.	"NYMP"	Carter; Stinson; Brian Russell; Brenda Russell	Rockwilder	4:03
15.	"Hova Song (Outro)" "Jigga My Nigga" "Girl's Best Friend"	Carter; K Rob; Hendrix; Carter; Dean; Carter; Dean	K Rob; Swizz Beatz; Swizz Beatz	11:01
Total length:				71:05

Vol. 3... Life and Times of S. Carter (European version)
No.	Title	Writer(s)	Producer(s)	Length
1.	"Hova Song (Intro)"	Carter; K Rob; Hendrix	K Rob	2:22
2.	"So Ghetto"	Carter; Martin; Cropper; Miles	DJ Premier	4:01
3.	"Do It Again (Put Ya Hands Up)" (featuring Amil and Beanie Sigel)	Carter; Whitehead; Grant; Stinson; Joshua	Rockwilder	4:39
4.	"Dope Man"	Carter; Shaw; Ifill; Branch	Clue; DURO; Digga; UN^{[a]}; Mahan^{[b]}	4:03
5.	"Things That U Do" (featuring Mariah Carey)	Carter; Carey; Dean; Joshua	Swizz Beatz	4:52
6.	"It's Hot (Some Like It Hot)"	Carter; Mosley	Timbaland	4:16
7.	"Snoopy Track" (featuring Juvenile)	Carter; Gray; Mosley	Timbaland	4:01
8.	"S. Carter" (featuring Amil)	Carter; Whitehead; Howard; Francis	Russ; SAF; Mahan^{[b]}	4:14
9.	"Pop 4 Roc" (featuring Beanie Sigel, Memphis Bleek, and Amil)	Carter; Grant; Cox; Whitehead; Shaw; Ifill	Clue; DURO	4:36
10.	"Hova Interlude"	Carter; K Rob; Hendrix	K Rob	1:33
11.	"Big Pimpin'" (featuring UGK)	Carter; Butler; Freeman; Mosley; Joshua	Timbaland	4:43
12.	"Is That Yo Bitch" (featuring Twista and Missy "Misdemeanor" Elliott)	Carter; Carl Mitchell; Melissa Elliott; Mosley	Timbaland	4:34
13.	"Come and Get Me"	Carter; Mosley	Timbaland	6:43
14.	"NYMP"	Carter; Stinson; Bri. Russell; Bre. Russell	Rockwilder	4:03
15.	"Hova Song (Outro)"	Carter; K Rob; Hendrix	K Rob	1:17
16.	"Anything" "Jigga My Nigga" "Girl's Best Friend"	Carter; Sam Anderson; J. Wright; Lionel Bart; Carter; Dean; Carter; Dean	Sam Sneed; P. Skam; Swizz Beatz; Swizz Beatz	14:21
Total length:				74:15

Notes

- ^{^[a]} indicates a co-producer
- ^{^[b]} indicates an additional producer

== Personnel ==
Credits are adapted from AllMusic.

- Amil – performer
- Darrell Branch – producer
- Mariah Carey – performer
- Drawing Board – art direction
- Fingaz – keyboards
- Kyledidthis – design
- Jay-Z – performer
- Jonathan Mannion – photography
- Memphis Bleek – performer
- Tatsuya Sato – assistant engineer
- Beanie Sigel – performer
- UGK – performer
- Dr. Dre – performer, mixing

== Charts ==
=== Weekly charts ===
Chart (2000)	Peak position
Canadian Albums (Billboard)	8
Swiss Albums (Schweizer Hitparade)	75
US Billboard 200	1
US Top R&B/Hip-Hop Albums (Billboard)	1

=== Year-end charts ===
Chart (2000)	Position
Canadian Albums (Nielsen SoundScan)	141
US Billboard 200	23
US Top R&B/Hip-Hop Albums (Billboard)	5

== Certifications ==
Region	Certification	Certified units/sales
Canada (Music Canada)	Gold	50,000^{^}
United Kingdom (BPI)	Silver	60,000^{^}
United States (RIAA)	3× Platinum	3,000,000^{^}
^{^} Shipments figures based on certification alone.

== See also ==
- List of number-one albums of 2000 (U.S.)
- List of number-one R&B albums of 2000 (U.S.)
