= Nigga What, Nigga Who (Originator 99) =

Single by Jay-Z

from the album Vol. 2... Hard Knock Life
- Released: March 1, 1999
- Recorded: 1997
- Genre: Gangsta rap
- Length: 3:53
- Label: Roc-A-Fella; Def Jam
- Songwriters: Shawn Carter; Jonathan Burks; Timothy Mosley
- Producer: Timbaland

Jay-Z singles chronology
"More Money, More Cash, More Hoes (Remix)" (1999)	"Nigga What, Nigga Who (Originator 99)" (1999)	"Jigga My Nigga" (1999)

Amil singles chronology
"Can I Get A..." (1998)	"Nigga What, Nigga Who (Originator 99)" (1999)	"Do It Again (Put Ya Hands Up)" (1999)

Big Jaz singles chronology
"Waitin'" (1996)	"Nigga What, Nigga Who (Originator 99)" (1999)	"Let's Go" (2001)

"Nigga What, Nigga Who (Originator 99)" (or its edited title "Jigga What, Jigga Who (Originator 99)" for the song's title to avoid hearing the word "Nigga") is a single by rapper Jay-Z from his third album Vol. 2... Hard Knock Life. It was released on March 1, 1999. The song is produced by Timbaland and features two artists: Big Jaz, who raps one verse and Amil, who speaks the track's chorus.

In 2004, the song was mashed with Linkin Park's "Faint" in the six track EP Collision Course.

== Track listing ==
1. "Nigga What, Nigga Who (Originator 99)"
2. "Ain't No Nigga"
3. "Bring It On"

=== Vinyl ===
B-Side

1. "Ain't No Nigga"

== Critical reception ==
In 2015, NME ranked the song number seven on their list of the ten greatest Jay-Z songs, and in 2019, Rolling Stone ranked the song number eight on their list of the 50 greatest Jay-Z songs.

== Charts ==
Chart (1999)	Peak position
US Billboard Hot 100	84
US Hot R&B/Hip-Hop Songs (Billboard)	23

== See also ==
- List of songs recorded by Jay-Z
