= Hard Knock Life (Ghetto Anthem) =

Single by Jay-Z

from the album Vol. 2... Hard Knock Life
- Released: October 27, 1998
- Recorded: 1998
- Genre: Hip-hop
- Length: 3:58 (album version); 3:36 (radio edit)
- Label: Roc-A-Fella; Def Jam
- Songwriters: Shawn Carter; Mark James; Charles Strouse; Martin Charnin
- Producer: The 45 King

Jay-Z singles chronology
"Can I Get A..." (1998)	"Hard Knock Life (Ghetto Anthem)" (1998)	"Money, Cash, Hoes" (1998)

Alternative cover

Music video
- "Hard Knock Life (Ghetto Anthem)" on YouTube

"Hard Knock Life (Ghetto Anthem)" is a single from American rapper Jay-Z's third album Vol. 2... Hard Knock Life, released on October 27, 1998. It features a vocal and pitch-modified instrumental sample of the song "It's the Hard Knock Life" from the 1977 musical Annie. The song was produced by the 45 King and at the time of its release was the most commercially successful Jay-Z single. The RIAA certified it as a Gold single in March 1999, and it reached Platinum status on July 15, 2015. In addition, it was nominated for Best Rap Solo Performance at the 41st Grammy Awards in 1999. The song peaked at number 15 on the Billboard Hot 100. Outside of the United States, "Hard Knock Life (Ghetto Anthem)" peaked within the top ten of the charts in Canada, Denmark, Germany, Netherlands, New Zealand, Norway, Iceland, Ireland, Sweden, Switzerland, and the United Kingdom, as well as the top 20 of the charts in Austria and Belgium. This marks the first time Jay-Z was associated with the Annie brand, as Jay-Z would later produce the 2014 film adaptation of Annie.

== Reception ==
=== Critical reception ===
Chuck Taylor of Billboard praised the inclusion of the "It's the Hard Knock Life" sample from Annie in "Hard Knock Life (Ghetto Anthem)", noting: "It's this kind of clever twist and original thinking that has the potential to expand the horizons of the genre." However, he criticized the radio version of the song, writing that the song was "edited and blanked to the point of distraction." He went on to say: "Programmers will have to weigh the value of the novelty against wondering why the artist didn't just start over with a clean slate if he intended to hit the airwaves."

=== Commercial reception ===
While it peaked at number 15 on the Billboard Hot 100, "Hard Knock Life" also achieved significant success outside the United States, peaking within the top ten of the charts in several countries, including Canada, Germany, and the United Kingdom. "Hard Knock Life" achieved its biggest success in the latter country, debuting and peaking at number two on the UK Singles Chart in December 1998, stalling behind Britain's biggest-selling song of 1998, "Believe" by Cher, during its seventh consecutive week at the summit of the chart.

== Music video ==
The music video for the song consists of Jay-Z performing outdoors in his native Brooklyn, New York. Dame Dash, DJ Clue, and Beanie Sigel all appear in the video.

== Impact and legacy ==
Slant Magazine listed "Hard Knock Life" at number 84 in their ranking of "The 100 Best Singles of the 1990s" in 2011, writing, "Jay-Z's co-opting of a discordant, already famous showtune is a rare novel endeavor in a genre generally defined by following the leader; it's pulled off so seamlessly that it's easy to forget what a ballsy move it was. The transformation of the original's piano base into a thumping organ creep sets the stage, but it's undeniably Jay-Z, transparently showing off his executive command by fussing with the levels at the start, which makes the song. The source material and the resulting product may seem diametrically opposed, but they end up being fundamentally about the same thing: forming a common thread of struggles with poverty spun into gold."

VH1 placed it at number 11 on their list of "100 Greatest Songs of Hip-Hop".

== Formats and track listings ==
=== UK CD ===
1. "Hard Knock Life (Ghetto Anthem) (Radio Edit)"
2. "Can't Knock The Hustle (Fool's Paradise Remix)" (featuring Meli'sa Morgan)
3. "Hard Knock Life (Ghetto Anthem) (Album Version)"

=== Vinyl ===
==== A-side ====
1. "Hard Knock Life (Ghetto Anthem) (swearing version)"
2. "Hard Knock Life (Ghetto Anthem) (LP Version)"

==== B-side ====
1. "Hard Knock Life (Ghetto Anthem) (Instrumental)"

== Charts ==
=== Weekly charts ===
Chart (1998–1999)	Peak position
Australia (ARIA)	31
Austria (Ö3 Austria Top 40)	14
Belgium (Ultratop 50 Flanders)	11
Belgium (Ultratop 50 Wallonia)	24
Canada (RPM)	6
Denmark (Tracklisten)	6
France (SNEP)	21
Germany (GfK)	5
Iceland (Íslenski Listinn Topp 40)	2
Ireland (IRMA)	9
Netherlands (Dutch Top 40)	5
Netherlands (Single Top 100)	6
New Zealand (Recorded Music NZ)	10
Norway (VG-lista)	4
Scottish Singles Sales (Official Charts)	10
Sweden (Sverigetopplistan)	6
Switzerland (Schweizer Hitparade)	7
UK Singles (Official Charts)	2
UK Hip Hop/R&B (Official Charts)	1
US Billboard Hot 100	15
US Hot R&B/Hip-Hop Songs (Billboard)	10
US Hot Rap Songs (Billboard)	2

=== Year-end charts ===
Chart (1998)	Position
Sweden (Sverigetopplistan)	98
UK Singles (OCC)	56
UK Urban (Music Week)	2

Chart (1999)	Position
Germany (Official German Charts)	48
Netherlands (Dutch Top 40)	110
Netherlands (Single Top 100)	82
Switzerland (Schweizer Hitparade)	46
US Billboard Hot 100	89
US Hot R&B/Hip-Hop Songs (Billboard)	53

== Certifications ==
Region	Certification	Certified units/sales
New Zealand (RMNZ)	Platinum	30,000^{‡}
United Kingdom (BPI)	Platinum	600,000^{‡}
United States (RIAA)	2× Platinum	2,000,000^{‡}
^{‡} Sales+streaming figures based on certification alone.

== Usage in media ==
The song was parodied by Mike Myers as his character Dr. Evil in the 2002 movie Austin Powers in Goldmember.

Comedy rap trio Sudden Death parodied the song on their album Die Laughing (2005), titled "Star Trek Life".

Sections of the song's chorus were featured as the background music on a montage of temper tantrums thrown by Nikki Grahame, a houseguest on season 7 of Big Brother UK, during her first run on the show. The montage was shown to Grahame by then Big Brother UK host Davina McCall during her initial eviction interview on July 14, 2006.
