= Money, Cash, Hoes =

1998 single by Jay-Z featuring DMX

Single by Jay-Z featuring DMX

from the album Vol. 2... Hard Knock Life
- Released: December 18, 1998
- Recorded: 1998
- Genre: East Coast hip-hop
- Length: 4:46
- Label: Roc-A-Fella; Def Jam
- Songwriters: Shawn Carter; Earl Simmons; Kasseem Dean
- Producer: Swizz Beatz

Jay-Z singles chronology
"Hard Knock Life (Ghetto Anthem)" (1998)	"Money, Cash, Hoes" (1998)	"More Money, More Cash, More Hoes (Remix)" (1999)

DMX singles chronology
"Slippin'" (1998)	"Money, Cash, Hoes" (1998)	"Ruff Ryders' Anthem (Remix)" (1999)

Music video
- "Money, Cash, Hoes" on YouTube

"Money, Cash, Hoes" is a song by American rapper Jay-Z as the third single from his third album Vol. 2... Hard Knock Life (1998). It was released on December 18, 1998. While the album version features a guest verse from rapper DMX, the remix also features fellow rappers and Roc-A-Fella Records artists Memphis Bleek and Beanie Sigel with production by Swizz Beatz. Its beat features a sample of "Theme of Thief" from the 1989 Sega game Golden Axe. Producer Swizz Beatz stated that the glissando sounds were made by him sliding his hand across a keyboard, originally as a joke. The remix version is featured on the soundtrack to the movie The Corruptor. The music video for the remix version of the track is intertwined with clips from The Corruptor as well. In the end of the track, Pain in Da Ass talks, recreating dialogue from the film Goodfellas.

== Critical reception ==
AllMusic's Dave Connolly describes the remix as "less than stellar," while Steve Juon of RapReviews.com considers it to be a "noteworthy" song that "Jay-Z fans will appreciate."

== Charts ==
Chart (1998–1999)	Peak position
U.S. Bubbling Under Hot 100	16
U.S. Billboard Hot R&B/Hip-Hop Songs	36
U.S. Billboard Hot Rap Songs	19

== See also ==
- List of songs recorded by Jay-Z
