= Vol. 2... Hard Knock Life =

Studio album by Jay-Z
- Released: September 29, 1998
- Recorded: December 1997 – August 1998
- Studios: D&D Studios (New York City); Sony Music Studios (New York City); Manhattan Center Studio (New York City); Quad Studios (New York City)
- Genre: Hip-hop
- Length: 61:43
- Labels: Roc-A-Fella; Def Jam
- Producers: Irv Gotti; Kid Capri; J-Runnah; Jermaine Dupri; Rockwilder; Lil' Rob; Mahogany; The 45 King; DJ Premier; Erick Sermon; Stevie J; Swizz Beatz; Timbaland; Darold "POP" Trotter

Jay-Z chronology
In My Lifetime, Vol. 1 (1997)	Vol. 2... Hard Knock Life (1998)	Vol. 3... Life and Times of S. Carter (1999)

Singles from Vol. 2... Hard Knock Life
- 1. "Can I Get A..." Released: August 22, 1998; 2. "Hard Knock Life (Ghetto Anthem)" Released: October 17, 1998; 3. "Money, Cash, Hoes" Released: December 18, 1998; 4. "Nigga What, Nigga Who (Originator 99)" Released: March 1, 1999

Vol. 2... Hard Knock Life is the third studio album by American rapper Jay-Z. It was released on September 29, 1998, by Roc-A-Fella Records and Def Jam Recordings. It went on to become his most commercially successful album, selling over 6 million copies in the United States. In the liner notes of the album, Jay-Z gives his thoughts on various tracks. The lyrics to the fast-paced "Nigga What, Nigga Who (Originator 99)" are also included.

== Background ==
Jay described the background to the album's lyrical themes in a December 1998 interview with Blues & Soul, saying, "Primarily I see myself as so much more than a rapper. I really believe I'm the voice for a lot of people who don't have that microphone or who can't rap. So I wanted to represent and tell the story of everybody who's been through what I've been through, or knows somebody that has. I also wanted to speak about our lifestyle to people who – though they may live, say, in the suburbs and not be part of that world – still want to know about it and understand it." Jay told MTV News that Vol. 2 was going to be his final album, but he later walked that statement back.

== Production ==
Several tracks in this feature a rougher sound than the glossier Bad Boy production on In My Lifetime, Vol. 1, most notably the three tracks produced by Ruff Ryders beatmaker Swizz Beatz. With the exception of Stevie J on "Ride or Die," Bad Boy producers play no role in Vol. 2, though Jay-Z enlisted Timbaland, Jermaine Dupri, and Irv Gotti for a more pop-oriented sound on three of the album's singles. This would also be Jay-Z's last album to feature his mentor Big Jaz.

== Critical reception ==
Professional ratings
Review scores
Source	Rating
AllMusic	3.5/5 stars
The Baltimore Sun	3/4 stars
Christgau's Consumer Guide	(3-star Honorable Mention)
Encyclopedia of Popular Music	3/5 stars
IGN	8.3/10
Los Angeles Times	3.5/4 stars
NME	6/10
Q	3/5 stars
The Rolling Stone Album Guide	3.5/5 stars
The Source	4.5/5 stars

In a contemporary review for Playboy, Robert Christgau deemed Vol. 2... Hard Knock Life a progression from its predecessor, featuring more noticeable beats that would appeal to listeners other than just hip hop aesthetes. He highlighted the title track's "audacious Annie sample" and the production of Swizz Beatz, who he believed took influence from postminimalist composers such as Steve Reich and Philip Glass. "And whatever Jay-Z's moral values", Christgau wrote, "the man knows how to put words together and say them real fast." He later gave it a three-star honorable mention in his Consumer Guide book, indicating "an enjoyable effort that consumers attuned to its overriding aesthetic or individual vision may well treasure". In The A.V. Club, Nathan Rabin said the record was "an uneven if worthwhile" album whose best songs "strip gangsta rap of its superthug bravado and replace it with a more nuanced understanding of the human emotions behind the gangsta facade". Q called it "the epitome of mainstream hip hop" at the time.

Vol. 2... Hard Knock Life was later ranked number 46 on Rolling Stone magazine's list of the 100 greatest albums from the 1990s.

== Commercial performance ==
Vol. 2... became Jay-Z's first album to debut at #1 on the Billboard 200, selling over 350,000 copies in its first week, and spent a total of 5 consecutive weeks at the top spot. Vol. 2... charted at number one in its second week earning 208,000 copies and stayed at the top for a third consecutive week selling 186,000 copies. In its fifth week, the album sold just under 174,000 copies and once again stayed at number one. It is Jay-Z's best selling album as of 2013 and was certified 5× Platinum by the RIAA in 2000. By 2013, the album had sold 5,400,000 copies in the United States. The album won the Grammy Award for Best Rap Album at the 41st Annual Grammy Awards. Though he won the award, he boycotted the ceremony, citing what he sees as the Grammys' continuing disrespect of hip-hop because they were not going to broadcast the rap nominations. He told MTV, "I am boycotting the Grammys because too many major rap artists continue to be overlooked. Rappers deserve more attention from the Grammy committee and from the whole world. If it's got a gun everybody knows about it; but if we go on a world tour, no one knows."

== Track listing ==
No.	Title	Writer(s)	Producer(s)	Length
1.	"Intro – Hand It Down" (featuring Memphis Bleek)	Shawn Carter; Christopher Martin; Malik Cox	DJ Premier	2:56
2.	"Hard Knock Life (Ghetto Anthem)"	S. Carter; Mark James; Charles Strouse; Martin Charnin	The 45 King	3:58
3.	"If I Should Die" (featuring Da Ranjahz)	S. Carter; Kasseem Dean; Malcolm Byer; Nigel Leguerre	Swizz Beatz	4:55
4.	"Ride or Die"	S. Carter; Steven Jordan	Stevie J	4:48
5.	"Nigga What, Nigga Who (Originator 99)" (featuring Big Jaz)	S. Carter; Jonathan Burks; Timothy Mosley	Timbaland	3:53
6.	"Money, Cash, Hoes" (featuring DMX)	S. Carter; Earl Simmons; Dean	Swizz Beatz	4:46
7.	"A Week Ago" (featuring Too $hort)	S. Carter; Jerald "J-Runnah" Stoute; Todd Shaw; Ernie Isley; Marvin Isley; O'Kelly Isley; Ronald Isley; Rudolph Isley; Chris Jasper	J-Runnah	5:00
8.	"Coming of Age (Da Sequel)" (featuring Memphis Bleek)	S. Carter; Dean	Swizz Beatz	4:21
9.	"Can I Get A..." (featuring Ja Rule and Amil)	S. Carter; Irving Lorenzo; Jeffrey Atkins; Robert "Lil Rob" Mays	Irv Gotti; Lil Rob	5:09
10.	"Paper Chase" (featuring Foxy Brown)	S. Carter; Mosley	Timbaland	4:34
11.	"Reservoir Dogs" (featuring The LOX, Beanie Sigel and Sauce Money)	S. Carter; Erick Sermon; Jason Phillips; David Styles; Sean Jacobs; Dwight Grant; Todd Gaither; Isaac Hayes	Erick Sermon; Darold "POP" Trotter^{[a]}; Rockwilder^{[b]}	5:19
12.	"It's Like That" (featuring Kid Capri)	S. Carter; Frank Friedman; David Love	Kid Capri	3:45
13.	"It's Alright" (featuring Memphis Bleek)	S. Carter; Imsomie "Mahogany" Leeper; Damon Dash; David Byrne; Brian Eno; Chris Frantz; Martina Weymouth; Jerry Harrison	Damon Dash; Mahogany	4:01
14.	"Money Ain't a Thang" (featuring Jermaine Dupri)	S. Carter; Jermaine Dupri; Steve Arrington; Charles Carter; Buddy Hankerson; Roger Parker	Jermaine Dupri	4:13

Notes

- ^{^[a]} – co-producer
- ^{^[b]} – uncredited co-producer
- "If I Should Die" features additional vocals by Wais P and Half Dead.
- "Nigga What, Nigga Who (Originator 99)" features additional vocals by Amil.
- "It's Like That" features additional vocals by Liz.

=== Sample credits ===
Intro (Hand It Down)

- "Are You Man Enough" by The Four Tops
- Contains lyrics from "Coming of Age" by Jay-Z feat. Memphis Bleek

Hard Knock Life (Ghetto Anthem)

- "It's the Hard Knock Life" from Annie

Money, Cash, Hoes

- "Theme of Thief" from Tohru Nakabayashi & Y. "Dolphin" Takada (from the Golden Axe soundtrack)

A Week Ago

- "Ballad for the Fallen Soldier" by The Isley Brothers

Reservoir Dogs

- "Theme from Shaft" by Isaac Hayes
- "24- Carat Black (Theme)" by 24 Carat Black
- "Know How" by Young MC

It's Like That

- "Beggar's Song" by Wet Willie

It's Alright

- "The Hall of Mirrors" by Kraftwerk
- "Once In a Lifetime" by Talking Heads

Money Ain't a Thang

- "Weak at the Knees" by Steve Arrington

== Charts ==
=== Weekly charts ===
Chart (1998–99)	Peak position
Canadian Albums (Billboard)	20
German Albums (Offizielle Top 100)	76
US Billboard 200	1
US Top R&B/Hip-Hop Albums (Billboard)	1

=== Singles ===
Year	Song	Billboard Hot 100	Hot R&B/Hip-Hop Singles & Tracks	Hot Rap Singles
1998	"Can I Get A..."	19	6	22
1998	"Hard Knock Life (Ghetto Anthem)"	15	10	2
1999	"Money, Cash, Hoes"	116	36	19
1999	"Jigga What, Jigga Who"	84	23	19

=== Year-end charts ===
Chart (1998)	Position
US Billboard 200	46
US Top R&B/Hip-Hop Albums (Billboard)	3

Chart (1999)	Position
US Billboard 200	15
US Top R&B/Hip-Hop Albums (Billboard)	5

=== Decade-end charts ===
Chart (1990–1999)	Position
US Billboard 200	62

== Certifications ==
Region	Certification	Certified units/sales
Canada (Music Canada)	Platinum	100,000^{^}
United Kingdom (BPI)	Gold	100,000^{‡}
United States (RIAA)	6× Platinum	6,000,000^{‡}
^{^} Shipments figures based on certification alone.^{‡} Sales+streaming figures based on certification alone.

== See also ==
- List of number-one albums of 1998 (U.S.)
- List of number-one R&B albums of 1998 (U.S.)
