= Do It Again (Put Ya Hands Up) =

Song from Jay-Z

Single by Jay-Z featuring Amil and Beanie Sigel

from the album Vol. 3... Life and Times of S. Carter
- Released: December 14, 1999
- Recorded: 1999
- Genre: East Coast hip hop
- Length: 4:38
- Label: Roc-A-Fella; Def Jam
- Songwriters: Shawn Carter; Dwight Grant; Amil Whitehead; Dana Stinson
- Producer: Rockwilder

Jay-Z singles chronology
"What You Think of That" (1999)	"Do It Again (Put Ya Hands Up)" (1999)	"Things That U Do" (2000)

Amil singles chronology
"Jigga What, Jigga Who (Originator 99)" (1999)	"Do It Again (Put Ya Hands Up)" (1999)	"Get None" (2000)

Beanie Sigel singles chronology
"More Money, More Cash, More Hoes (Remix)" (1999)	"Do It Again (Put Ya Hands Up)" (1999)	"My Mind Right" (2000)

Music video
- "Do It Again (Put Ya Hands Up)" on YouTube

"Do It Again (Put Ya Hands Up)" is the lead single from rapper Jay-Z's fourth album Vol. 3... Life and Times of S. Carter. The song features production by Rockwilder, including guest vocals by Amil and Beanie Sigel.

== Formats and track listings ==
=== CD ===
1. "Do It Again (Put Ya Hands Up)" (LP Version)
2. "Do It Again (Put Ya Hands Up)" (Radio Edit)
3. "So Ghetto"
4. "Jigga My Nigga"

=== Vinyl ===
A-side

1. "Do It Again (Put Ya Hands Up)" (Radio Edit)
2. "Do It Again (Put Ya Hands Up)" (Instrumental)
3. "Do It Again (Put Ya Hands Up)" (LP Version)

B-side

1. "So Ghetto" (Radio Edit)
2. "So Ghetto" (LP Version)
3. "So Ghetto" (Instrumental)

== Charts ==
Chart (1999–2000)	Peak position
US Billboard Hot 100	65
US Hot R&B/Hip-Hop Songs (Billboard)	17
US Hot Rap Songs (Billboard)	9
US R&B/Hip-Hop Airplay (Billboard)	15

== See also ==
- List of songs recorded by Jay-Z
