= Amil =

American rapper (born 1973)

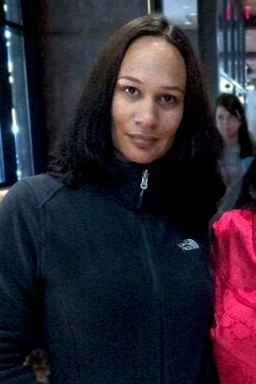
- Amil in 2014

Background information
- Born: Amil Kahala Whitehead; September 19, 1973 (age 52); New York City, U.S.
- Genres: East Coast hip-hop
- Occupations: Rapper; singer; songwriter
- Years active: 1994–2014
- Labels: D.O.E.; Roc-A-Fella; Columbia

Amil Kahala Whitehead (born September 19, 1973) is an American rapper. Based in New York City, she signed with Jay-Z's Roc-A-Fella Records, in a joint venture with Columbia Records in 1997. The following year, she appeared alongside Ja Rule on Jay-Z's single "Can I Get A..." (from the Rush Hour film soundtrack), which peaked at number 19 on the Billboard Hot 100.

Amil's debut studio album, All Money Is Legal (2000), peaked at number 45 on the U.S. Billboard 200 chart and spawned the singles "I Got That" (featuring Beyoncé) and "4 da Fam" (featuring Jay-Z, Memphis Bleek and Beanie Sigel). The album was met with mixed critical reception and she parted ways with both labels shortly after.

== Early life ==
Amil was born on September 19, 1973, in New York City, to a white mother and a black father. Amil's parents abandoned her at an early age, and she was then adopted and raised by her aunt. As a teenager, Amil gave birth to a son, with her then boyfriend Kendall Morgan. Amil's aunt and adoptive mother died in 1994. A year later, Morgan was killed in a stabbing incident and Amil started dealing drugs to financially support herself. During this time, she used music as an emotional outlet.

== Career ==
In 1997, Amil was a member of Major Coins, an all-female group. The group met Jay-Z, who was looking for a woman to provide vocals on his third album, Vol. 2... Hard Knock Life. Jay-Z asked Amil to freestyle and liked it, and selected her for the role.

When Major Coins broke up, Amil decided to follow a solo career with Jay-Z's label, Roc-A-Fella Records, and joined the 1999 Hard Knock Life Tour. After the tour, she appeared on songs with Mariah Carey, Beyoncé, Jermaine Dupri, AZ, DJ Kay Slay, LL Cool J, and Funkmaster Flex.

She has appeared on Jay-Z songs such as "Nigga What, Nigga Who", "Can I Get A...", "Do It Again (Put Ya Hands Up)", "S Carter", "You, Me, Him and Her", and "Pop 4 Roc". In August 2000, Amil released her debut solo album, All Money Is Legal. The album featured the single "I Got That", a duet with Beyoncé, and All-Star Roc-A-Fella single "4 Da Fam". The album also featured Jay-Z, Memphis Bleek, Carl Thomas, Eve, and Beanie Sigel.

Album sales were disappointing, and the singles did not sell well either. Following that album, her last Roc-A-Fella/Def Jam single, "Hey Papi", a song from the soundtrack to the feature film Nutty Professor II: The Klumps, was released. In 2000, Amil filmed her appearance as "Tonya" in the crime drama film Get Down or Lay Down. The movie, later retitled State Property, was distributed through a joint deal with Roc-A-Fella and Lionsgate and released in early 2002 after Amil's departure from the label; in the final version of the film, she is credited as "Boss’ Assassin".

In 2005, Amil temporarily re-formed Major Coinz and released songs on the mixtape circuit including the single "Glamorous Life" which was featured on MTV's Mixtape Monday.

In 2008, Amil released mixtapes titled Az Iz and Amil Returns: The Lost Classics Edition, delivering lyrically with songs such as the emotional "Tears of a Teenage Mother" and the Caribbean vibed "Don't Worry".

Amil released the song "Stop" in July 2012. The song was intended to promote the rapper's unreleased mixtape, A Time to Kill. Amil released the song "Remember" in 2014. It was also intended to promote a mixtape titled Another Moment in Life, which remains unreleased.

== Discography ==
=== Albums ===
Year	Album	Chart positions	
Year	Album	U.S.	U.S. R&B
2000	All Money Is Legal: Studio album; Released: August 29, 2000; Format: CD	45	12
2008	Amil Az Iz: Mixtape; Release: July 2008; Format: CD, digital download	—	—

=== Singles ===
Year	Single	Chart positions				Album
Year	Single	U.S.	U.S. Rap	U.S. R&B	UK	Album
1998	"Can I Get A..." (Jay-Z featuring Ja Rule and Amil)	19	22	6	24	Vol. 2... Hard Knock Life / Rush Hour (soundtrack)
1999	"Jigga What, Jigga Who" (Jay-Z featuring Amil and Big Jaz)	83	24	6	19	Vol. 2... Hard Knock Life
1999	"Do It Again (Put Ya Hands Up)" (Jay-Z featuring Amil and Beanie Sigel)	65	9	11	—	Vol. 3... Life and Times of S. Carter
2000	"Get None" (Tamar Braxton featuring Jermaine Dupri and Amil)	—	—	59	—	Tamar
2000	"Hey Papi" (Jay-Z featuring Amil and Memphis Bleek)	76	12	16	—	Nutty Professor II O.S.T
2000	"I Got That" (featuring Beyoncé)	—	—	101	—	A.M.I.L
2000	"4 Da Fam" (featuring Jay-Z, Memphis Bleek and Beanie Sigel)	99	48	29	—	A.M.I.L
2000	"That's Right/Get Down" (promo only)	—	—	—	—	A.M.I.L

=== Album appearances ===
Year	Song	Album
1999	"I Still Believe" (Stevie J. Remix) [Mariah Carey featuring Amil and Mocha]	I Still Believe CD
1999	"When Will U See" (Rell featuring Amil)	!2"
1999	"First One Hit" (Amil and Solé)	Light It Up O.S.T
1999	"S. Carter" (Jay-Z featuring Amil)	Vol. 3... Life and Times of S. Carter
1999	"Pop 4 Roc" (Jay-Z featuring Amil, Memphis Bleek and Beanie Sigel)	Vol. 3... Life and Times of S. Carter
1999	"For My Thugs" (Funkmaster Flex featuring Amil and Jay-Z, Memphis Bleek and Beanie Sigel)	The Tunnel
2000	"Hello" (LL Cool J featuring Amil)	G.O.A.T.
2000	"Road Dawgs" (Da Brat, Eve, Jay-Z and Amil)	Backstage: A Hard Knock Life
2000	"You, Me, Him and Her" (Beanie Sigel, Amil, Jay-Z and Memphis Bleek)	The Dynasty: Roc La Familia
2000	"PYT" (Memphis Bleek featuring Amil and Jay-Z)	The Understanding
2001	"How Many Wanna" (AZ featuring Amil)	9 Lives
2001	"What Yall Wanna Hear" (Queen Pen featuring Amil)	Conversations with Queen
2003	"Seven Deadly Sins" (DJ Kayslay featuring Amil, Angie Martinez, Duchess, Lady May, Remy Ma, Sonja Blade and Vita)	The Streetsweeper, Vol. 1
2008	"A Game" (AZ featuring Amil)	Undeniable
2011	"Get Them Stax Daddy" (Ron Lyonz featuring Amil)	The Rebirth of Hip Hop
