= The Cutting Room =

Music venue in New York City

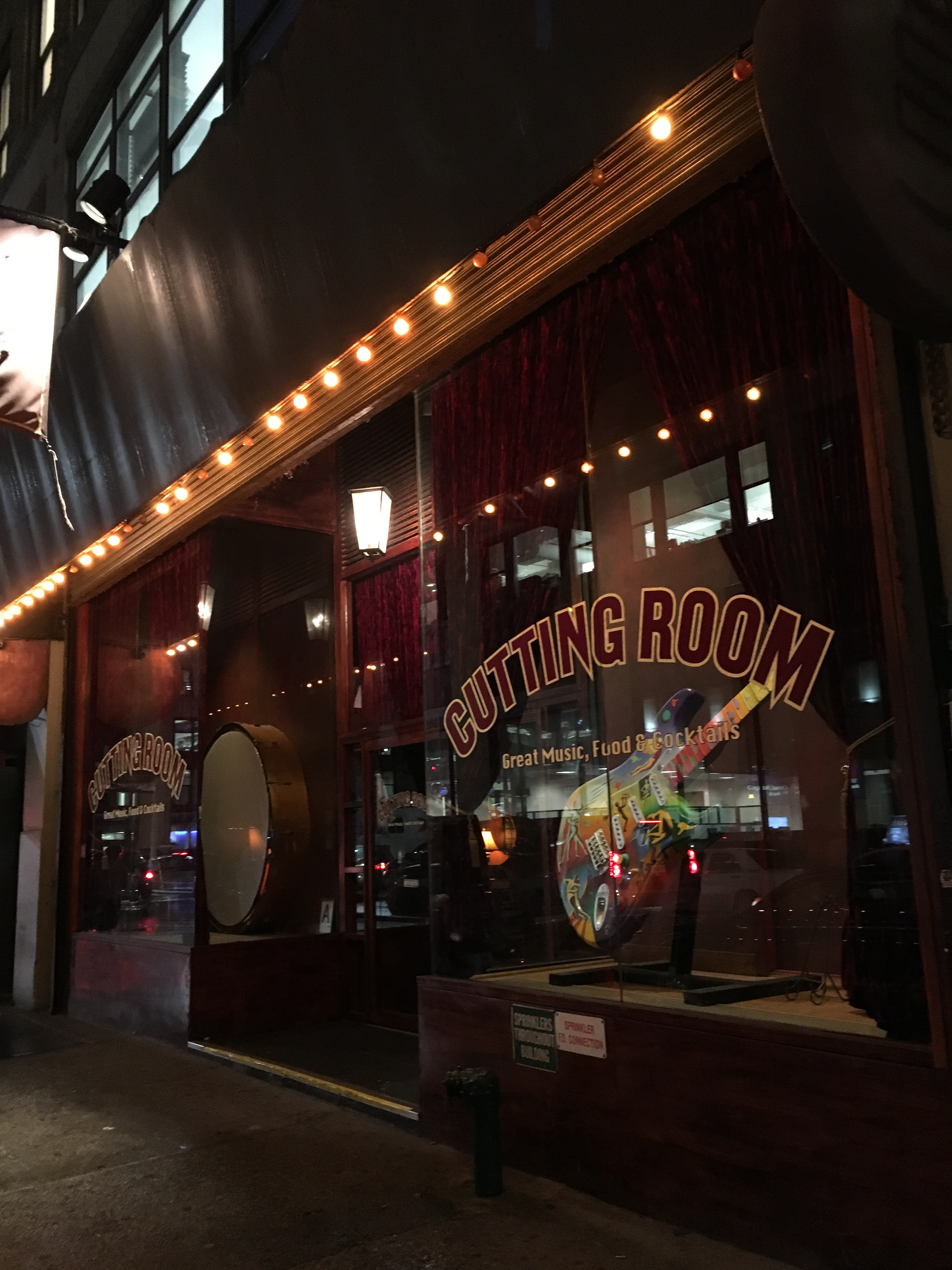
- Interactive map of The Cutting Room
- Location: New York City, New York, United States
- Coordinates: 40°44′45.37″N 73°58′58.46″W
- Type: Music venue

Construction
- Opened: 1999
- Closed: 2009
- Rebuilt: 2013 (reopened)

Website
- thecuttingroomnyc.com

The Cutting Room is a music venue in New York City that was open at 19 West 24th Street from late 1999 through January 2009 for music of all varieties, and reopened at the beginning of 2013 in a new location at 44 East 32nd Street. It was co-owned since its founding by actor Chris Noth and Berklee College of Music alumnus Steve Walter.

Among those who have performed at The Cutting Room are Lizzy Grant, Norah Jones, Sheryl Crow, Gwyneth Paltrow, Kid Rock, Vanessa Carlton, Lady Gaga, Sandra Bernhard, Billy Joel, Mark Kostabi, Mini-Kiss, Edward W. Hardy, The Shells, David Duchovny, Gillian Anderson. and Ryan McCartan.

Noth met his wife Tara Lynn Wilson while she was working at The Cutting Room; the two had a boy (Orion Christopher Noth) in January 2008.

The Cutting Room was the source of controversy in 2025, allegedly using slurs and intimidation towards the band DOOM GONG after overbooking them with another act.
