= Can I Get A... =

1998 single by Jay-Z

"Can I Get A... (Soundtrack Version)"
- Sticker from shrink wrap of the U.S. 12-inch vinyl single

Single by Jay-Z featuring Jah and Amil

from the album Def Jam's Rush Hour Soundtrack and Vol. 2... Hard Knock Life
- Released: August 22, 1998
- Genre: Hip hop; electro-disco
- Length: 5:11
- Label: Roc-A-Fella; Def Jam; PolyGram
- Songwriters: Shawn Carter; Jeffrey Atkins; Irving Lorenzo; Robin Mays
- Producers: Irv Gotti; Lil' Rob

Jay-Z singles chronology
"Money Ain't a Thang" (1998)	"Can I Get A..." (1998)	"Hard Knock Life (Ghetto Anthem)" (1998)

Jah singles chronology
"Can I Get A..." (1998)	"Grand Finale" (1998)

Amil singles chronology
"Can I Get A..." (1998)	"Jigga What, Jigga Who (Originator 99)" (1999)

Music video
- "Can I Get A..." on YouTube

"Can I Get A..." is a song recorded and released by American rapper Jay-Z, featuring Ja Rule (credited as Jah) and Amil. It was released on Def Jam's Rush Hour Soundtrack in promotion of the film Rush Hour, but also appears on Jay-Z's third album Vol. 2... Hard Knock Life as its first single. The song is produced by Irv Gotti and Lil' Rob. The song is notable for popularizing a young Amil and Ja Rule, as well as becoming one of Jay-Z's most commercially successful singles at the time, peaking at number 19 on the Billboard Hot 100.

The chorus of the original song starts with "Can I Get A 'Fuck You'?", but it was censored to "Can I Get A 'What What'?" for radio airplay. The song deals with the question of whether Jay-Z's girlfriend would stick with him if he weren't wealthy. Producer Irv Gotti claimed Ja Rule gave Jay-Z the chorus and lyrical flow for the record.

The vinyl "Can I Get A..." single was released in 1998 with two tracks that do not feature Jay-Z: Ja Rule's "Bitch Betta Have My Money" and Wu-Tang Clan's "And You Don't Stop". The CD single was released in 1999 with two different tracks that do not feature Jay-Z: Case and Joe's "Faded Pictures" as well as Dru Hill and Redman's "How Deep Is Your Love". All songs were included in the Rush Hour soundtrack.

Janet Jackson's 2004 song "Strawberry Bounce", from her album Damita Jo, samples "Can I Get A...".

VH1 ranked "Can I Get A..." at No. 57 in the network's 100 Greatest Songs of the 90s.

Chris Penn appears in the video as a bartender. Jermaine Dupri also makes a cameo.

== Formats and track listings ==
=== CD ===
1. "Can I Get A..." – 5:13
2. "Faded Pictures" – 3:48
3. "How Deep Is Your Love" – 3:58

=== Vinyl ===
==== A-side ====
1. "Can I Get A..." (radio edit)
2. "Bitch Betta Have My Money" (radio edit)
3. "And You Don't Stop" (radio edit)

==== B-side ====
1. "Can I Get A..." (TV track)
2. "Bitch Betta Have My Money" (TV track)
3. "And You Don't Stop" (TV track)

== Charts ==
Chart (1998–1999)	Peak position
Canada Top Singles (RPM)	36
Germany (GfK)	12
Netherlands (Dutch Top 40)	30
Scottish Singles Sales (Official Charts)	55
Switzerland (Schweizer Hitparade)	26
UK Hip Hop/R&B (Official Charts)	5
UK Singles (Official Charts)	24
US Billboard Hot 100	19
US Hot R&B/Hip-Hop Songs (Billboard)	6
US Hot Rap Songs (Billboard)	22
US Pop Airplay (Billboard)	27
US Rhythmic Airplay (Billboard)	2

=== Year-end charts ===
Chart (1999)	Position
Germany (Official German Charts)	80

== Certifications ==
Region	Certification	Certified units/sales
United States (RIAA)	Platinum	1,000,000^{‡}
^{‡} Sales+streaming figures based on certification alone.

== See also ==
- List of songs recorded by Jay-Z
