= Daven Vanderpool =

American rap and R&B record producer

Daven "Prestige" Vanderpool is an American hip-hop and R&B record producer. He was once a member of Bad Boy's in-house production team, "The Hitmen", and has also produced on many Bad Boy-related projects. His usual sound is a distinctive combination of funk and more heavily, electronica influences, promoted through his use of samples from Gary Numan, Dominatrix and Duran Duran. This sound is particularly heard on his productions for Jay-Z, Sauce Money, Mase, Mic Geronimo and Shyne.

== Production credits ==
=== Solo ===
- 1994: O.C. - "Point o Viewz" (with Buckwild); Word...Life
- 1996: Lil' Kim - "Dreams" (Featuring Adilah); Hard Core
- 1996: Yo-Yo - "Thank You, Boo"; Total Control
- 1997: LL Cool J - "Wanna Get Paid" (Featuring The Lost Boyz); Phenomenon
- 1997: Heavy D - "Waterbed Hev" (Featuring Vinia Mojica); Waterbed Hev
- 1997: Jay-Z - "Imaginary Player", "(Always Be My) Sunshine" (Featuring Babyface & Foxy Brown); In My Lifetime, Vol. 1
- 1998: Cam'Ron - "Me, My Moms & Jimmy"; Confessions of Fire
- 1998: McGruff - "What You Want"; Destined To Be
- 1999: Mase - "No Matter What", "Do It Again" (Featuring Puff Daddy); Double Up
- 1999: The Notorious B.I.G. - "Big Booty Hoes" (Featuring Too Short); Born Again
- 2000: Shyne - "It's Okay"; Shyne
- 2000: Beanie Sigel - "Die"; The Truth

=== With Puff Daddy ===
- 1998: Mic Geronimo - "Nothin' Move But The Money" (Featuring Kelly Price); Vendetta
- 1998: Total - "Sitting Home (Waiting For You Remix)" (Featuring Shyne); "Sitting Home" (Single)
- 1999: Mase - "If You Want To Party" (Featuring Cheri Dennis); Double Up'
- 1999: Faith Evans - "Love Like This" (Bad Boy Remix) (Featuring Black Rob); "All Night Long" (Single)
- 1999: Lil' Cease - "Don't Stop" (Featuring Puff Daddy), "My Niggaz" (Featuring Jay-Z, Bristal & Blake C.); The Wonderful World Of Cease-a-Leo
- 1999: Puff Daddy - "Victory" (Hip Hop Remix) (Featuring The Notorious B.I.G. & Busta Rhymes); "P.E. 2000" (Single)
- 1999: Puff Daddy - "Do You Like It... Do You Want It..." (Featuring Jay-Z); Forever
- 1999: The Notorious B.I.G. - "Notorious B.I.G." (Featuring Puff Daddy & Lil' Kim); "Would You Die 4 Me?" (Featuring Puff Daddy & Lil' Kim); Born Again
- 2000: Sauce Money - "Do You See?" (Featuring Puff Daddy & Pam Long from Total); Middle Finger U.
