= The Hits Collection, Volume One =

Greatest hits album by Jay-Z
- Released: November 22, 2010
- Genre: Hip-hop
- Length: 56:03
- Label: Def Jam; Roc Nation
- Compiler: Jay-Z

Jay-Z chronology
| The Blueprint 3 (2009) | The Hits Collection, Volume One (2010) | Watch the Throne (2011) |

Professional ratings
Review scores
| Source | Rating |
|---|---|
| AllMusic | 4/5 stars |
| BLARE Magazine | 4/5 stars |
| Pitchfork | 7.5/10 |
| PopMatters | 6/10 |
| RapReviews | 6/10 |
| Rolling Stone | 4/5 stars |
| The Sydney Morning Herald | 4/5 stars |

The Hits Collection, Volume One is a greatest hits album by American rapper Jay-Z. It was released on November 22, 2010, by Def Jam Recordings and Roc Nation. Although greatest hits compilations of Jay-Z have been released internationally before, this was the first of its kind to be released in the United States, in which it was released in a standard edition, deluxe edition, collector's edition box set as well as a 3-disc deluxe vinyl. The album features four tracks from The Black Album, three from The Blueprint 3 and one from each of Jay's other solo albums dating back to Vol. 2... Hard Knock Life.

== Title and packaging ==
The Hits Collection, Volume One was Jay-Z's first greatest hits album to be released by Roc Nation, and is the only greatest hits album to be released so far in his career. The front packaging of the album cover features Jay-Z's signature diamond hands, which are a reference to his fifth studio album The Dynasty: Roc La Familia. The inside album sleeve contains a booklet with photos of Jay-Z throughout his career, song descriptions, as well as an opening acknowledgment from Jay-Z himself.

In the opening acknowledgement, Carter wrote:

To be honest, I've avoided doing this type of project. It's difficult to pick 14 songs that define who I am. Some of my best songs were never released as singles. I've challenged myself to make classic albums that will define my legacy–and not just individual songs. Still, the timing of this project finally felt right to me.

Most of my recording career was with Def Jam. That chapter is closed, and a new one has opened: with Roc Nation. This album represents that transition. This is a collector's piece. It represents some of my strongest work. Each song represents a different time, a different feeling, or a different emotion. Plenty of people have already purchased this music 100 times. Still–I worked hard to sequence the songs, to create a true listening experience. Once you have all the great songs in one place, you can't go wrong. Ha.

This project means more than record sales. I collect art, things that inspire me, and I want Hits to be that for you. The artwork, the photos I'm willing to share represent my appreciation for your support through the years. As I go to the next level and open more doors, I truly believe there's no limit to where we can take hip-hop culture. Vol. 2 comin' soon. On to the next one.

— S.C. (Shawn Carter)

== Track listing ==
The Hits Collection, Volume One track listing
| No. | Title | Writer(s) | Producer(s) | Length |
|---|---|---|---|---|
| 1. | "Public Service Announcement (Interlude)" (from The Black Album) | Shawn Carter; Justin Smith; Raymond Levin | Just Blaze | 2:45 |
| 2. | "Run This Town" (featuring Rihanna & Kanye West) (from The Blueprint 3) | Carter; Kanye West; Ernest Wilson; Jeff Bhasker; Robyn Fenty; Athanasios Alatas | Kanye West; No I.D. | 4:27 |
| 3. | "'03 Bonnie & Clyde" (featuring Beyoncé) (from The Blueprint 2: The Gift & The Curse) | Carter; West; Prince; Darryl Harper; Ricky Rouse; Tupac Shakur; Tyrone Wrice | Kanye West | 3:25 |
| 4. | "Encore" (from The Black Album) | Carter; West | Kanye West | 4:09 |
| 5. | "I Just Wanna Love U (Give It 2 Me)" (from The Dynasty: Roc La Familia) | Carter; Pharrell Williams; Chad Hugo; James Johnson; Christopher Wallace; Deric Angelettie; Sean Combs; Kit Walker; Todd Shaw | The Neptunes | 3:49 |
| 6. | "Izzo (H.O.V.A.)" (from The Blueprint) | Carter; West; Berry Gordy; Alphonso Mizell; Freddie Perren; Deke Richards | Kanye West | 4:00 |
| 7. | "D.O.A. (Death of Auto-Tune)" (from The Blueprint 3) | Carter; Wilson; Gary DeCarlo; Dale Frashuer; Paul Leka; Janko Nilović; Dave Sucky | No I.D. | 4:16 |
| 8. | "99 Problems" (from The Black Album) | Carter; Rick Rubin; Norman Landsberg; Felix Pappalardi; John Ventura; Leslie Weinstein; William Squier; Tracy Marrow; Alphonso Henderson | Rick Rubin | 3:55 |
| 9. | "Empire State of Mind" (featuring Alicia Keys) (from The Blueprint 3) | Carter; Alexander Shuckburgh; Janet Sewell-Ulepic; Angela Hunte; Alicia Keys; Bert Keyes; Sylvia Robinson | Al Shux; Janet "Judy" Sewell-Ulepic (co.); Angela Hunte (co.) | 4:37 |
| 10. | "Dirt off Your Shoulder" (from The Black Album) | Carter; Timothy Mosley | Timbaland | 4:02 |
| 11. | "Hard Knock Life (Ghetto Anthem)" (from Vol. 2... Hard Knock Life) | Carter; Mark James; Charles Strouse; Martin Charnin | The 45 King | 4:00 |
| 12. | "Show Me What You Got" (from Kingdom Come) | Carter; Smith; Johnny Pate; Eric Sadler; Carlton Ridenhour; James Boxley; Michael McEwan | Just Blaze | 3:42 |
| 13. | "Roc Boys (And the Winner Is)..." (from American Gangster) | Carter; Combs; Deleno Matthews; Levar Coppin; Thomas Brenneck; Dave Guy; Mike Deller; Leon Michels; Bosco Mann | Diddy; LV & Sean C | 4:12 |
| 14. | "Big Pimpin'" (featuring UGK) (from Vol. 3... Life and Times of S. Carter) | Carter; Mosley; Kyambo Joshua; Chad Butler; Bernard Freeman | Timbaland | 4:44 |
| Total length: | | | | 56:03 |

Deluxe edition bonus tracks
| No. | Title | Producer(s) | Length |
|---|---|---|---|
| 15. | "Young, Gifted and Black" | Marley Marl | 2:01 |
| 16. | "Pump It Up" (Freestyle) | Just Blaze | 1:57 |
| 17. | "My President Is Black" (Remix) (Young Jeezy featuring Jay-Z) | Tha Bizness | 3:58 |
| 18. | "Go Hard" (Remix) (DJ Khaled featuring Jay-Z, Kanye West and T-Pain) | The Runners | 3:36 |
| 19. | "This Life Forever" | Ty Fyffe | 3:43 |
| Total length: | | | 15:15 |

== Charts ==
Chart performance for The Hits Collection, Volume One
| Chart (2010–2013) | Peak position |
|---|---|
| Australian Albums (ARIA) | 83 |
| Belgian Albums (Ultratop Flanders) | 121 |
| German Albums (Offizielle Top 100) | 89 |
| New Zealand Albums (RMNZ) | 19 |
| Norwegian Albums (VG-lista) | 16 |
| Swiss Albums (Schweizer Hitparade) | 98 |
| UK Albums (Official Charts) | 20 |
| US Billboard 200 | 43 |
| US Top R&B/Hip-Hop Albums (Billboard) | 11 |

2023 chart performance for The Hits Collection, Volume One
| Chart (2023) | Peak position |
|---|---|
| Canadian Albums (Billboard) | 86 |

== Certifications ==
Certifications for The Hits Collection, Volume One
| Region | Certification | Certified units/sales |
|---|---|---|
| United Kingdom (BPI) | Platinum | 300,000^{‡} |
^{‡} Sales+streaming figures based on certification alone.
