= The Grey Album =

2004 album by Danger Mouse

Remix album (bootleg) by Danger Mouse
- Released: February 2004
- Recorded: 30 May – 14 October 1968 (The Beatles' sessions), July – October 2003 (Jay-Z's sessions)
- Genres: Hip hop; rap rock; mashup
- Length: 44:36
- Producer: Danger Mouse

Danger Mouse chronology
DM & Jemini; Ghetto Pop Life (2003)	The Grey Album (2004)	Gorillaz; Demon Days (2005)

The Grey Album is a mashup album by Danger Mouse, released in 2004. It mixes an a cappella version of rapper Jay-Z's The Black Album with samples from the Beatles' self-titled ninth album, commonly known as "The White Album". The Grey Album gained notoriety when the Beatles' record label EMI attempted to halt its distribution despite approval of the project from Jay-Z and the two surviving Beatles, Paul McCartney and Ringo Starr.

== History ==
Danger Mouse created The Grey Album as an experimental project intended for a limited 3,000-copy release in February 2004. While Danger Mouse never asked permission to use the Beatles' material, Jay-Z's a cappella recordings, though copyrighted, were released commercially for the purpose of encouraging mashups and remixes. A buzz around the album resulted in wider Internet distribution and media attention garnering a glowing review in the February 9, 2004 issue of The New Yorker. The Grey Album was named the best album of 2004 by Entertainment Weekly and ranked No. 10 in The Village Voice's annual Pazz and Jop critics poll.

Danger Mouse is quoted as saying:

A lot of people just assume I took some Beatles and, you know, threw some Jay-Z on top of it or mixed it up or looped it around, but it's really a deconstruction. It's not an easy thing to do. I was obsessed with the whole project, that's all I was trying to do, see if I could do this. Once I got into it, I didn't think about anything but finishing it. I stuck to those two because I thought it would be more challenging and more fun and more of a statement to what you could do with sample alone. It is an art form. It is music. You can do different things, it doesn't have to be just what some people call stealing. It can be a lot more than that.

Danger Mouse also discussed the creation of The Grey Album at length as part of the 2007 Danish documentary Good Copy Bad Copy.

== Legal repercussions ==
The hype around The Grey Album caught the attention of Beatles' copyright holder EMI, who ordered Danger Mouse and retailers carrying the album to cease distribution. Music industry activist group Downhill Battle responded by coordinating Grey Tuesday, an electronic civil disobedience event held on 24 February 2004. Participating websites posted copies of The Grey Album for free download for a 24-hour period in protest of EMI's attempts to prevent distribution of the mashup on the grounds that sampling is fair use and that a statutory license should be provided in the same manner as if an artist were to perform or record a cover version of a song. Hundreds of websites publicized the event with 170 hosting the album for download. Over 100,000 copies were downloaded on that day alone. The legal repercussions of the protest were minimal; a number of the participants received cease and desist letters from EMI, but no charges were filed in connection with the event.

== Reception and legacy ==
Professional ratings
Aggregate scores
Source	Rating
Metacritic	79/100
Review scores
Source	Rating
AllMusic	4.5/5 stars
Chicago Sun-Times	3.5/4 stars
Entertainment Weekly	A
Houston Chronicle	4/5
NME	10/10
The Observer	4/5 stars
Pitchfork	7.7/10
Q	4/5 stars
Spin	A
Tiny Mix Tapes	4/5

Danger Mouse is quoted as saying: "This wasn't supposed to happen … I just sent out a few tracks (and) now online stores are selling it and people are downloading it all over the place." Danger Mouse denied being the agent provocateur, saying it "was not my intent to break copyright laws. It was my intent to make an art project."

Cultural critic Sam Howard-Spink observed that "The tale of The Grey Album and Grey Tuesday offers a rich case study for the examination of a wide variety of contemporary cultural issues within the context of the 'copyright wars' remix culture and the age of the digital network."

Jonathan Zittrain, professor of Internet law at Harvard Law School, comments that

As a matter of pure legal doctrine, the Grey Tuesday protest is breaking the law, end of story. But copyright law was written with a particular form of industry in mind. The flourishing of information technology gives amateurs and home-recording artists powerful tools to build and share interesting, transformative, and socially valuable art drawn from pieces of popular cultures. There's no place to plug such an important cultural sea change into the current legal regime.

On November 16, 2010, Jay-Z offered his thoughts on the album during an interview on NPR. "I think it was a really strong album. I champion any form of creativity, and that was a genius idea—to do it. And it sparked so many others like it … I was honored to be on—you know, quote-unquote, the same song with The Beatles."

On February 11, 2011, Paul McCartney whilst commenting on the influence of the Beatles and black music gave this assessment as part of a BBC documentary titled The Beatles and Black Music, produced by Vivienne Perry and Ele Beattie.

It was really cool when hip-hop started, you would hear references in lyrics, you always felt honored. It's exactly what we did in the beginning – introducing black soul music to a mass white audience. It's come full circle. It's, well, cool. When you hear a riff similar to your own, your first feeling is "rip-off." After you've got over it you think, "Look at that, someone's noticed that riff."

McCartney said of EMI's reaction: "I didn't mind when something like that happened with The Grey Album. But the record company minded. They put up a fuss. But I was like, 'Take it easy guys, it's a tribute.'"

== Track listing ==
All songs sampled are by the Beatles, except where noted.

No.	Title	Song(s) sampled	Length
1.	"Public Service Announcement"	"Long, Long, Long"	2:45
2.	"What More Can I Say"	"While My Guitar Gently Weeps" "Top Billin'" by Audio Two	4:25
3.	"Encore"	"Glass Onion", "Savoy Truffle"	2:40
4.	"December 4th"	"Mother Nature's Son"	3:34
5.	"99 Problems"	"Helter Skelter"	4:06
6.	"Dirt off Your Shoulder"	"Julia"	3:59
7.	"Moment of Clarity"	"Happiness Is a Warm Gun"	4:00
8.	"Change Clothes"	"Piggies", "Dear Prudence"	4:04
9.	"Allure"	"Dear Prudence"	4:06
10.	"Justify My Thug"	"Rocky Raccoon"	4:12
11.	"Lucifer 9 (Interlude)"	"Revolution 9", "I'm So Tired"	2:01
12.	"My 1st Song"	"Cry Baby Cry", "Savoy Truffle", "Helter Skelter"	4:44

== The Grey Video ==
In the autumn of 2004 Swiss directing team Ramon & Pedro (Laurent Fauchere and Antoine Tinguely) made "The Grey Video" to promote the single "Encore". The black and white video mixes clips from the Beatles' film A Hard Day's Night with footage from a Jay-Z concert and new footage involving computer generated imagery to create scenes that involve John Lennon breakdancing and Ringo Starr scratching. Because the original Beatles footage was on film and the added footage originated as digital video, picture-quality differences are visible throughout the piece.

The video begins with The Beatles performing before cameras and a live audience. Ringo Starr begins to drum to the 1:00 to 1:08 segment of "Glass Onion". John Lennon begins to sing while George Harrison and Paul McCartney nod their heads to the beat. After a few moments, the monitors in the director's booth begin to flicker, showing scenes of Jay-Z rapping "Encore", and the lyrics of the chorus begin to show behind the group. Starr's drum kit becomes a set of turntables and a mixer as he begins to scratch while John continues to sing "Oh, yeah!" as sampled from "Glass Onion". As "Encore" moves into the second verse, the beat changes to a sample of "Savoy Truffle". A John Lennon body double starts to breakdance, leading to a head-spin. McCartney and Harrison are replaced by two dancers. The Lennon double backflips off the screen, flinging his wig off. Ringo walks off and the lights fade to black.

The video was not available commercially, but became popular over the Internet. Due to the legal issues surrounding the use of copyrighted material, the video is shown with the disclaimer that it was made for non-commercial and experimental purposes only.

== Remastered version ==
In November 2012, recording engineer John Stewart produced a remastered version, The Grey Album (Remastered), after deciding that there was something amiss with the original sound, and released it for free download.

== Other Black Album remixes ==
The Grey Album is one of many The Black Album remix albums. Producers Kno (from the Cunninlynguists) and Kev Brown had already released their own colour-themed remix albums, titled The White Al-bu-lum and The Brown Album, respectively. Pete Rock remixed Jay-Z's vocals with beats from his own PeteStrumentals album for a release on Good Foot Records. DJ Bazooka Joe remixed tracks that RJD2 originally produced for other artists, creating The Silver Album. Also, 9th Wonder created his own album with remixes called Black is Back.
