= OJ da Juiceman discography =

- Studio albums: 2
- Singles: 8
- Mixtapes: 55

This is the discography for American hip hop musician OJ da Juiceman.

== Studio albums ==
List of studio albums, with selected chart positions
Title	Details	Peak chart positions		
Title	Details	US Heat	US R&B /HH	US Rap
The Otha Side of the Trap	Released: January 27, 2009; Label: 32 Ent., Mizay, Asylum; Formats: CD, digital download	12	32	9
The Otis Williams Jr. Story	Released: December 5, 2014; Label: 32 Ent., 101 Distribution; Formats: CD, digital download	—	—	—
"—" denotes a recording that did not chart or was not released in that territory.

== Mixtapes ==
List of mixtapes, with year released
Title	Details
On Da Come Up	Released: 2007; Label: 32 Ent.; Hosted by DJ Burn One; Format: Digital download
Hood Classics Extra	Released: July 1, 2008; Label: 32 Ent.; Hosted by Dutty Laundry & DJ Burn One; Format: Digital download
I Am Da Juice	Released: July 10, 2008; Label: 32 Ent.; Hosted by Dutty Laundry; Format: Digital download
Juice World	Released: October 24, 2008; Label: 32 Ent.; Hosted by DJ Ace; Format: Digital download
The Come Up Pt. 2	Released: August 3, 2008; Label: 32 Ent.; Hosted by DJ Bobby Black & DJ Mars; Format: Digital download
Culinary Art School	Released: October 25, 2008; Label: 32 Ent., Gangsta Grillz; Hosted by DJ Drama & DJ Holiday; Format: Digital download
I Got the Juice	Released: December 11, 2008; Label: 32 Ent.; Hosted by DJ Smallz & Trap-A-Holics; Format: Digital download
Guacamole World	Released: January 21, 2009; Label: 32 Ent.; Hosted by Bigga Rankin & Evil Empire; Format: Digital download
Alaska n Atlanta	Released: September 4, 2009; Label: 32 Ent.; Hosted by DJ Holiday; Format: Digital download
6 Ringz	Released: March 2, 2009; Label: 32 Ent.; Hosted by Trap-A-Holics; Format: Digital download
O.R.A.N.G.E.	Released: February 1, 2010; Label: 32 Ent.; Hosted by DJ Drama; Format: Digital download
The Realest Nigga I Know	Released: July 3, 2010; Label: 32 Ent.; Hosted by DJ Rell; Format: Digital download
Bouldercrest Day	Released: August 2, 2010; Label: 32 Ent.; Hosted by DJ Don Cannon; Format: Digital download
Culinary Art School 2	Released: March 2, 2011; Label: 32 Ent.; Hosted by DJ Ill Will & DJ Holiday; Format: Digital download
Cook Muzik	Released: May 30, 2011; Label: 32 Ent.; Hosted by DJ Ill Will & DJ Holiday; Format: Digital download
R&B Juice	Released: August 20, 2011; Label: 32 Ent.; Hosted by DJ Tephlon; Format: Digital download
32. Ent (The Compilation) (with 32 Ent.)	Released: September 30, 2011; Label: 32 Ent.; Hosted by DJ 5150; Format: Digital download
Lord of the Rings	Released: November 23, 2011; Label: 32 Ent.; Hosted by DJ Don Cannon; Format: Digital download
Cook Muzik 2: 100/1000	Released: July 3, 2012; Label: 32 Ent.; Hosted by DJ 5150; Format: Digital download
32. Ent (The Compilation Pt. 2) (with 32 Ent.)	Released: October 31, 2012; Label: 32 Ent.; Hosted by DJ 5150; Format: Digital download
6 Ringz 2 (The Playoffs Edition)	Released: March 2, 2013; Label: 32 Ent.; Hosted by Trap-A-Holics; Format: Digital download
Juice World 2	Released: March 3, 2013; Label: 32 Ent.; Hosted by DJ Ace, DJ P Exclusives & DJ Ransom Dollars; Format: Digital download
Return of Da Juiceman	Released: October 31, 2013; Label: 32 Ent.; Format: Digital download
Alaska n Atlanta 2	Released: February 28, 2014; Label: 32 Ent.; Hosted by DJ Holiday; Format: Digital download
Clock Werk (with Cap.1)	Released: March 27, 2014; Label: 32 Ent.; Hosted by DJ E Sudd, DJ Victoriouz; Format: Digital download
Kings of the Trap (with Criminal Manne)	Released: November 17, 2014; Label: 32 Ent.; Hosted by DJ Scream, DJ Woogie; Format: Digital download
The Realest Nigga I Know 2	Released: May 4, 2015; Label: 32 Ent.; Hosted by DJ Rell; Format: Digital download
Juice vs Zay (with Zaytoven)	Released: July 30, 2015; Label: 32 Ent., Zaytown USA; Format: Digital download
6 Ringz 3	Released: October 31, 2015; Label: 32 Ent.; Hosted by Trap-A-Holics; Format: Digital download
Welcome to Texaco City: Black Friday (with Benzino)	Released: December 5, 2015; Label: 32 Ent.; Format: Digital download
Bouldercrest El Chapo	Released: December 25, 2015; Label: 32 Ent.; Hosted by DJ Ben Frank, DJ Young Shawn, DJ Grady; Format: Digital download
Texaco Muzik Vol.1	Released: March 30, 2016; Label: 32 Ent.; Hosted by DJ Q; Format: Digital download
Bricks & Bales (with Chicago Santana)	Released: June 4, 2016; Label: 32 Ent.; Hosted by DJ Holiday; Format: Digital download
Math Class	Released: September 1, 2016; Label: 32 Ent.; Hosted by DJ Duce; Format: Digital download
On da Come Up 2	Released: November 23, 2016; Label: 32 Ent.; Format: Digital download
Can't Make Dis Up	Released: February 24, 2017; Label: 32 Ent.; Format: Digital download
BoulderCrest Hero	Released: February 24, 2017; Label: 32 Ent.; Format: Digital download
Bomb N Da Bush's	Released: February 24, 2017; Label: 32 Ent.; Format: Digital download
Kitchen Talk	Released: February 28, 2017; Label: 32 Ent.; Format: Digital download
Life On Edge	Released: February 28, 2017; Label: 32 Ent.; Format: Digital download
Mr Texaco	Released: February 28, 2017; Label: 32 Ent.; Format: Digital download
Out Da Mudd	Released: March 8, 2017; Label: 32 Ent.; Format: Digital download
Sun Valley	Released: March 9, 2017; Label: 32 Ent.; Format: Digital download
Trapped Out Like Ah 9to5	Released: March 9, 2017; Label: 32 Ent.; Format: Digital download
Math Class 2: Summa School Edition	Released: August 4, 2017; Label: 32 Ent.; Hosted by DJ Duce; Format: Digital download
32 Trenches	Released: December 29, 2017; Label: 32 Ent.; Format: Digital download
Ghost & Tommy	Released: April 2, 2018; Label: 32 Ent.; Format: Digital download
Da Trap Boss	Released: November 23, 2018; Label: 32 Ent.; Format: Digital download
6 Ringz 4	Released: July 26, 2019; Label: 32 Ent.; Format: Digital download
East Atlantafornia (with Lost God)	Released: August 13, 2019; Label: 32 Ent. & TNE; Hosted by Sam Hoody; Format: Digital download
Zone Connect (with Zaytoven & Yung L.A.)	Released: March 13, 2020; Label: 32 Ent.; Format: Digital download
Freshly Squeezed (with YFN Kay)	Released: February 5, 2021; Label: 32 Ent. & YFNBC; Hosted by DJ Lavish Lee; Format: Digital download
Lost Tapes (with Zaytoven	Released: February 12, 2021; Label: 32 Ent., Zaytoven Global, LLC; Format: Digital download
Alaska n Atlanta 3	Released: July 16, 2021; Label: 32 Ent.; Format: Digital download
Oj Da Juiceman, Pt.2	Released: March 14, 2025; Label: 32 Ent.; Format: Digital download

== Singles ==
=== As lead artist ===
Title	Year	Peak chart positions						Album
Title	Year	US Bub.	US R&B/HH	US Rap	US Main. R&B/HH	US R&B/HH Air.	US Rap Air.	Album
"Make tha Trap Say Aye" (featuring Gucci Mane)	2008	8	22	13	15	20	13	The Otha Side of the Trap
"I'm Gettin' Money"	2008	—	—	—	—	—	—	The Otha Side of the Trap
"Plug Prices" (featuring Young Scooter)	2013	—	—	—	—	—	—	6 Ringz 2
"No Hook"	2013	—	—	—	—	—	—	Juice World 2
"Whip,Skirt,Aye,Yae"	2014	—	—	—	—	—	—	The Otis Williams Jr. Story
"ClockWork"	2016	—	—	—	—	—	—	Math Class and On da Come Up 2
"Box Chevy"	2016	—	—	—	—	—	—	On da Come Up 2
"In & Out"	2017	—	—	—	—	—	—	Math Class 2
"Mr. Aye Ok" (with Cassius Jay or remix featuring Young Scooter)	2017	—	—	—	—	—	—	Da Trap Boss
"Drip Wit da Swag"	2018	—	—	—	—	—	—	Da Trap Boss
"Use My Wrist"	2022	—	—	—	—	—	—	OJ da Juiceman, Pt. 2
"2 Solid"	2024	—	—	—	—	—	—	OJ da Juiceman, Pt. 2
"Swish" (featuring Gucci Mane and Rocko)	2025	—	—	—	—	—	—	OJ da Juiceman, Pt. 2
"Big Dawg Status" (with BossMan Dlow)	2025	—	—	—	—	—	—	Chicken Talkin Bastard
"—" denotes a recording that did not chart or was not released in that territory.

=== As featured artist ===
Title	Year	Peak chart positions							Album
Title	Year	US	US R&B/HH	US Rap	US Main. R&B/HH	US Rhy.	US R&B/HH Air.	US Rap Air.	Album
"Stupid" (Playaz Circle featuring OJ da Juiceman)	2009	—	— (Note: "Stupid" did not enter the R&B/Hip-Hop Songs chart, but peaked at number one on the Bubbling Under R&B/Hip-Hop Songs chart, which acts as a 25-song extension to the R&B/Hip-Hop Songs chart.)	—	—	—	—	—	Flight 360: The Takeoff
"Supaman High" (R. Kelly featuring OJ da Juiceman)	2009	—	46	—	—	—	46	—	Untitled
"Ridiculous" (DJ Drama featuring Gucci Mane, Yo Gotti, Lonnie Mac and OJ da Juiceman)	2009	—	— (Note: "Ridiculous" did not enter the R&B/Hip-Hop Songs chart, but peaked at number four on the Bubbling Under R&B/Hip-Hop Songs chart, which acts as a 25-song extension to the R&B/Hip-Hop Songs chart.)	—	—	—	—	—	Gangsta Grillz: The Album (Vol. 2)
"Who's Real" (Jadakiss featuring Swizz Beatz and OJ da Juiceman)	2009	—	39	19	24	—	39	18	The Last Kiss
"Wasted (Remix)" (Gucci Mane featuring OJ da Juiceman)	2009	36	3	3	1	24	3	3	The State vs. Radric Davis
"What You Think" (Zaytoven, Ty Dolla Sign and Jeremih featuring OJ da Juiceman)	2018	—	—	—	—	—	—	—	Trapholizay
"—" denotes a recording that did not chart or was not released in that territory.

=== Other charted songs ===
Title	Year	Peak chart positions		Album
Title	Year	US R&B/HH Dig.	US Rap Dig.	Album
"Coca Coca" (Gucci Mane featuring Rocko, Waka Flocka Flame, Shawty Lo, Yo Gotti, Nicki Minaj and OJ da Juiceman)	2010	48	34	Burrrprint 2
"—" denotes a recording that did not chart or was not released in that territory.

== Guest appearances ==
List of non-single guest appearances, with other performing artists, showing year released and album name
Title	Year	Other artist(s)	Album
"I Am The Man"	2008	B.o.B, Bun B	B.o.B vs. Bobby Ray
"Keep It Hood"	2009	Project Pat	Real Recognize Real
"Helluvalife"	2009	Gorilla Zoe, Gucci Mane	Don't Feed da Animals
"Who's Real"	2009	Jadakiss, Swizz Beatz	The Last Kiss
"Ridiculous"	2009	DJ Drama, Gucci Mane, Yo Gotti, Lonnie Mac	Gangsta Grillz: The Album (Vol. 2)
"Walking On Ice"	2009	Twista, Gucci Mane	Category F5
"In the Kitchen"	2009	Killer Mike	Underground Atlanta
"Show Em"	2009	D-Block	No Security
"Count Them #"	2009	Rich Boy, Supa Villain, Al Myte	Kool-Aid Kush & Convertibles
"Damn"	2009	Waka Flocka Flame	Salute Me or Shoot Me 2
"Stupid"	2009	Playaz Circle	Flight 360: The Takeoff
"Real As They Get"	2009	Gucci Mane, Waka Flocka Flame	Burrrprint: 3D (The Movie: Part 3)
"Flexxin'"	2009	Waka Flocka Flame, Gucci Mane, David Blayne	Streets R Us
"Supaman High"	2009	R. Kelly	Untitled
"Please Wait"	2009	Wooh da Kid, Waka Flocka Flame	Pressure
"Choppa Loose"	2009	Wooh da Kid	Pressure
"Gingerbread Man"	2009	Gucci Mane	The State vs. Radric Davis
"Bricks"	2009	Gucci Mane, Yo Gotti	The State vs. Radric Davis
"Keep It Hood"	2010	DJ Kay Slay, Papoose, Yo Gotti	More Than Just a DJ
"Same S**t" (Remix)	2010	Slim Dunkin, Waka Flocka Flame	Built 4 Interrogation
"Buy the Whole Thang"	2010	French Montana	Mac & Cheese 2
"Bussin Down Bricks"	2010	Frenchie	The Chicken Room
"Raised In the Ghetto"	2010	Ya Boy	Street Legend
"F**k with Me"	2010	Da Kid, Slim Dunkin, Parlae, Kebo Gotti	Bad Boys
"Coca Coca"	2010	Gucci Mane, Rocko, Waka Flocka Flame, Shawty Lo, Yo Gotti, Nicki Minaj	Burrrprint (2) HD
"I Wanna Rock" (Interstate Trafficking Remix)	2010	DJ Green Lantern, Snoop Dogg, Roscoe Dash, Rick Ross, Yo Gotti, Maino	—N/a
"AK AK Loaded"	2010	Spice 1, Teezio	Hallowpoint
"Im Heavy"	2011	Tha City Paper	DOPaminE
"This Is What I Do"	2011	Gucci Mane, Waka Flocka Flame	The Return of Mr. Zone 6
"Let's Eat"	2011	YG Hootie	Red Zepplin
"Tipsy Texting"	2011	Kafani, Bobby V	Lifestyles of the Rich & Famous
"I Do That"	2011	Kafani, Bobby V	Lifestyles of the Rich & Famous
"Q&A"	2011	Mistah F.A.B.	The Grind Is a Terrible Thing to Waste, Pt. 2
"Chickens Go for 30"	2011	Wooh da Kid, Gucci Mane	Strap-a-Holics
"Jackboyz"	2011	Wooh da Kid, Gucci Mane	Strap-a-Holics
"Please Wait"	2011	Wooh da Kid, Waka Flocka Flame	Late Night Grind, Vol. 5: Best of Wooh Da Kid Edition
"For the Hood"	2011	Bo Deal, Marc Alonzo, Paperboy	The Chicago Code 2
"Hella Right"	2011	Kay-O Redd	YNS: The Rise of the Sykho Soulja
"Money"	2012	40 Glocc, Chamillionaire	New World Agenda
"My Plug Love Me"	2012	JT the Bigga Figga	Conflict of Interest
"Ea 93"	2012	Kayo Redd	YNS 2: Full Time Grind
"Sane Into Insane"	2012	Kayo Redd	YNS 2: Full Time Grind
"Coulda Bought A Jet"	2012	Chief Keef	—N/a
"Push It to the Limit"	2012	Cartel MGM	The White Brick Road
"Street Lights"	2013	Young Scooter, Gucci Mane	Street Lottery
"Well Damn"	2013	Young Rhome	Perfectly Flawed
"Don't Needa Know"	2013	Cartel MGM	Money, Power, Respect
"All These Bitches"	2013	Gucci Mane, Chief Keef	Diary Of A Trap God
"Stash House"	2013	Gucci Mane	Diary Of A Trap God
"Stealing"	2013	Gucci Mane	—N/a
"In Love With The Money"	2013	Peter Jackson, RiFF RaFF	Good Company
"Sleep When U Die"	2017	2 Chainz	Pretty Girls Like Trap Music
"Ralo Back"	2017	Gucci Mane, Ralo	RaloLaflare
"The Field"	2017	Curren$y, Lex Luger	The Motivational Speech EP
"Bundle"	2017	Berner, Young Dolph	Tracking Numbers EP
"China White"	2017	Zaytoven	Zaytoven Presents: Trapping Made It Happen
"What You Think"	2018	Zaytoven, Ty Dolla $ign, Jeremih	Trapholizay
"Coulda Bought A Jet"	2018	Chief Keef	The Leek Vol. 6
"Brick Man"	2019	Zaytoven, Chief Keef, Al Nuke, Humble G	Make America Trap Again
"Millions"	2019	Cassius Jay, Young Scooter	God Bless Da 6
