= Kool-Aid Kush & Convertibles =

2009 mixtape by Rich Boy

Kool-Aid Kush & Convertibles is a mixtape by rap artist Rich Boy, recorded in Mississippi with the producer Supa Villain. It was released in July 2009 by Atlanta DJ, DJ Scream.

== Reception ==
Shaheem Reid picked out Kool-Aid Kush & Convertibles as a "necessary notable" in his half-year roundup for mtv.com, recommending particularly the tracks "Put Me in the Game", "Convertible Status" and "Send For Me". William E. Ketchum of HipHopDX also singled out the "laid-back" track "Send For Me", along with the tracks "Country Club" and "Come And Get Me".

Reportedly the title reflects the artist's wish to emphasize partying as an alternative to violence, and the joy of simple pleasures in a time of economic recession. It also marks the rapper's switching to Kool Aid rather than the recreational use of cough syrup. For Ketchum this emphasis meant that the subject matter was limited in scope throughout, though he found the rapper's charisma alleviated this concern. He praised the music on the tape; its "organs, synths, and robust percussion" being suited to loud car and truck systems.

XXL recommended the tape only to fans of Rich Boy's hit single "Throw Some D's". Their reviewer found the lyrical content of the tape shallow, and accordingly rated the mixtape poorly. Considering Rich Boy potentially more significant than the average party rapper, he posited that the "bouncy rhythms" and "rapid drums" of Southern rap do not allow for reflection or deeper lyrical concerns. He found an irony there, since the musical backing was for him the most appealing aspect of the release.

The Fader did not echo any of these concerns, praising the "ridiculous" flow of Rich Boy's rapping, and suggesting that the rapper's mixtape output could make an official followup to his major label debut (2007's Rich Boy) unnecessary. Pitchfork went further on that point, implying that the mixtape showed Rich Boy with a "hungrier-than-thou intensity" that was lacking on his 2007 release.

== Track listing ==
1. "You Better Go Hard" 1:26
2. "Put Me In The Game" 2:36
3. "Re-Elected (Interlude)" 0:32
4. "Kool-Aid, Kush & Convertibles" 3:19
5. "Convertible Status" 2:18
6. "Come & Get Me" (feat. Fiend) 5:55
7. "I'ma Fool Wit It" (feat. Lo) 3:23
8. "Don Dada" (feat. Young Dose) 3:44
9. "How We Rockin" 0:33
10. "Country Club (Freestyle)" 2:04
11. "Drop Top (Remix)" 4:20
12. "Count Dem #" (feat. OJ Da Juiceman, Supa Villain & Al Myte) 5:28
13. "Send For Me" 3:13
14. "Buried Alive Outro (Rich Boy Shout-Outs)" 0:25
15. "I'm In Love" 2:48
16. "Its Over" 3:19
17. "Fuck Boy" (feat. Gangsta Boo) 3:45
18. "Grown And Sexy" (feat. Supa Villain) 4:03
19. Bonus Track: "Where Its At" (feat. Gorilla Zoe & Gucci Mane) 4:55
