= Aqua (music producer) =

- Also known as: Aqua
- Born: Nicholas McCarrell; April 6, 1982 (age 44)
- Origin: New York City, New York, United States
- Years active: 2002–present

Nicholas McCarrell (born April 6, 1982), professionally known as Aqua, is an American record producer and composer of film and television scores. As a record producer, he has most notably worked with Roc-a-fella Records artists Jay-Z, Kanye West, and Beanie Sigel. His scoring credits include Entourage and George Lopez.

== Early career ==
Aqua began his music career as an intern at MTV News until August 2001. He began distributing copies of his demo in January 2002 after moving back to Los Angeles, generating a buzz within the Roc-A-Fella camp. This buzz began Aqua's relationship with Jay-Z, producing "My 1st Song" off of Jay's Black Album.

== Television credits ==
=== George Lopez ===
Nicholas became the sole composer of George Lopez in 2002. He scored every episode from 2002-2007 that aired on ABC, entering syndication one month after the series finale. On March 8, 2007, it was announced that George Lopez would join the Nick at Nite lineup. To this date, it continues to be their highest rated series and one of cable's best for an off-network sitcom. The show currently airs in broadcast syndication on The CW Plus and on Telelatino in Canada.

=== Entourage ===
In 2007, Aqua began working as a weekly composer for the HBO series Entourage.

=== 90210 ===
Aqua began working as a weekly composer for the show 90210 in 2009. The show airs weekly on The CW.

=== How to Make It in America ===
Nicholas also composes music for the HBO series How to Make It in America.

== Discography ==
=== 2003 ===
==== Jay-Z - The Black Album ====
- 14. "My 1st Song"
  - Sample Credit: Los Angeles Negros - "Tu y Tu Mirar...Yo y Mi Canción"

=== 2004 ===
==== Beanie Sigel - The B. Coming ====
- 02. "I Can't Go On This Way"
  - Sample Credit: Gloria Scott - Love Me, Love Me Or Leave Me, Leave Me

=== 2008 ===
==== Wale - "100 Miles & Running" ====
- 20. "Rediscover Me"
  - Sample Credit: The Main Ingredient - Rediscover Me

=== 2007 ===
==== Rich Boy - "Rich Boy" ====
- 13. "Lost Girls"

=== 2010 ===
==== YTCracker ====
- "California Breeze"

=== 2014 ===
==== Λllison Taylor ====
- "Sail On"

==== YTCracker ====
- "California Breeze"

=== 2015 ===
==== Bambaata Marley ====
- "Waiting for the War"
