= What More Can I Say =

Song by Jay-Z

from the album The Black Album
- Released: November 4, 2003
- Recorded: 2003
- Genre: Hip hop
- Length: 4:55
- Label: Roc-A-Fella; Def Jam
- Songwriters: Shawn Carter; Thomas Bell; Roland Chambers; Kenneth Gamble
- Producer: The Buchanans

"What More Can I Say" is a song by American rapper Jay-Z's eighth studio album, The Black Album (2003). It was released as a "street single" concurrently with the album's official single, "Change Clothes". It premiered on Hot 97 on October 22, 2003 and was the first track from The Black Album to be heard by the public. The song includes additional vocals from Vincent "Hum V" Bostic and was produced by The Buchanans.

The intro has a sampled monologue by Russell Crowe from the film Gladiator, the song also samples "Something for Nothing" by MFSB from their self-titled album released in 1973. This sample prompted Jay-Z to quote a The Notorious B.I.G. lyric as he was featured on that song.

The rings and things you sing about, bring 'em out. It's hard to yell when the bar-rel's in your mouth.

The quote appears immediately after the song addresses accusations of Jay-Z stealing lyrics from The Notorious B.I.G. Busta Rhymes is mentioned in the song with Jay-Z stating that his isn't "animated, like say a, Busta Rhymes".

The song was sampled by T.I. in his song "Bring Em Out".

On The Grey Album, "What More Can I Say" is mashed up with The Beatles' "While My Guitar Gently Weeps".

Rapper Tyler, the Creator of OFWGKTA sampled it in his song "Jack and the Beanstalk" from his 2009 album, Bastard.

The song "Otis" from the collaboration album Watch the Throne by Kanye West and Jay-Z carries the following line "What more can I say?". It samples "Top Billin'" from American hip-hop duo Audio Two, who released the album What More Can I Say? in 1988.

Memphis Bleek raps the line of the song "Do My..." which was released in the opening track featuring former labelmate Jay-Z, which he also sampled three years later from his 2000 album The Understanding.

Used as the outro to Sway Calloway's radio show Sway in the Morning on Shade 45.

== See also ==
- List of songs recorded by Jay-Z
