= No Way Out (2007) =

World Wrestling Entertainment pay-per-view event

- Promotional poster featuring The Undertaker
- Promotion: World Wrestling Entertainment
- Brand: SmackDown!
- Date: February 18, 2007
- City: Los Angeles, California
- Venue: Staples Center
- Attendance: 14,000
- Buy rate: 218,000

Pay-per-view chronology
← Previous; Royal Rumble	Next → WrestleMania 23

No Way Out chronology
← Previous; 2006	Next → 2008

The 2007 No Way Out was a professional wrestling pay-per-view (PPV) event produced by World Wrestling Entertainment (WWE). It was the ninth No Way Out and took place on February 18, 2007, at the Staples Center in Los Angeles, California, held exclusively for wrestlers from the promotion's SmackDown! brand division.

This was the final brand-exclusive PPV of the first brand split period, as following WrestleMania 23 the following month, brand-exclusive PPVs were discontinued and then in August 2011, the brand extension ended. Another brand-exclusive PPV would not be held again until Backlash in September 2016 after the brand split was reintroduced in July that year.

The main event was an interpromotional tag team match between Batista and The Undertaker (from SmackDown!) and John Cena and Shawn Michaels (from Raw). Cena and Michaels won the match after Cena pinned Undertaker following an FU. The main match on the undercard was an interpromotional Six-man tag team match between the team of Chris Benoit and The Hardys (Matt Hardy and Jeff Hardy) and the team of MNM (Joey Mercury and Johnny Nitro) and Montel Vontavious Porter (MVP), which was won by the Hardys and Benoit after Benoit forced Mercury to submit to the Crippler Crossface.

== Production ==
=== Background ===
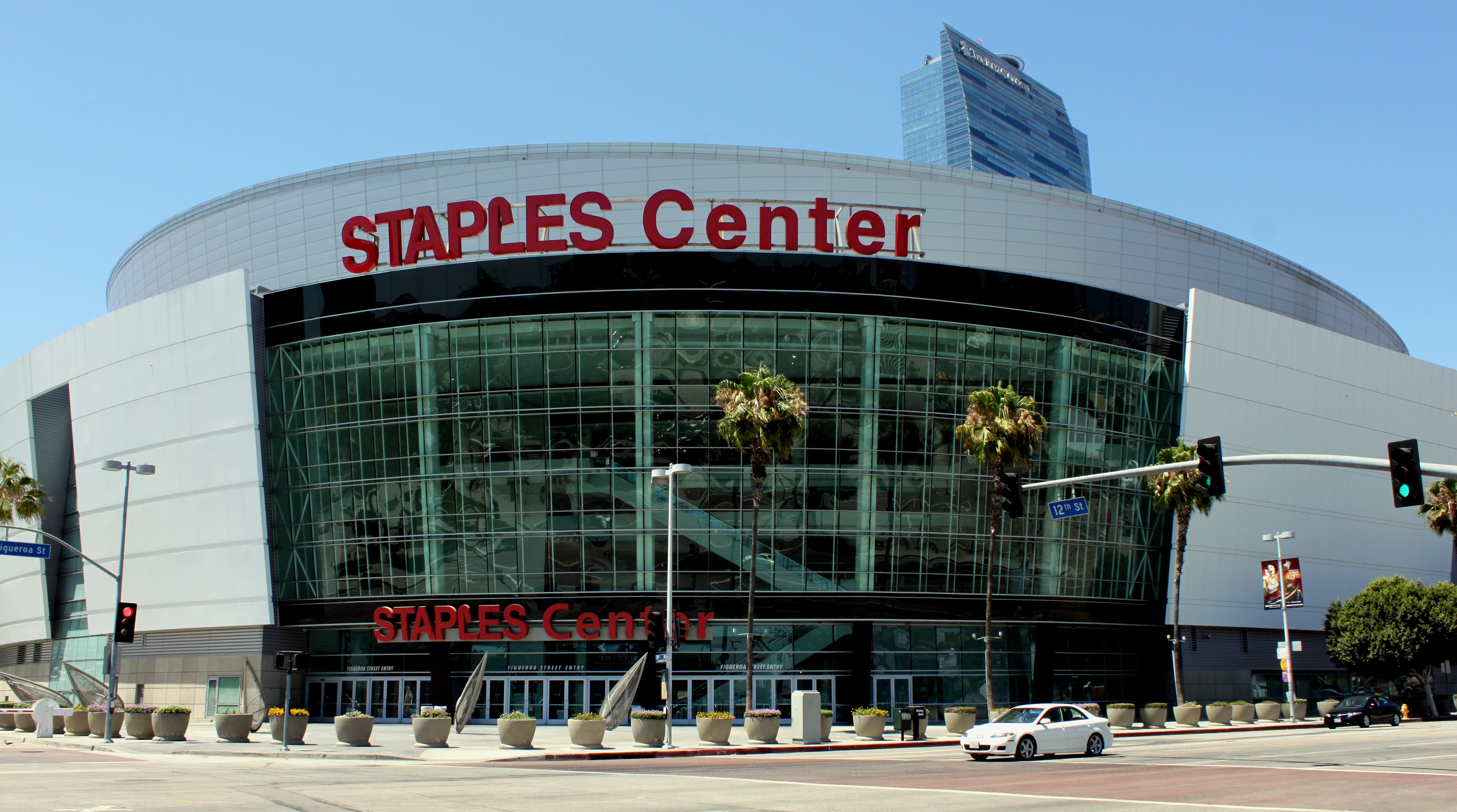
The ninth No Way Out was held at the Staples Center in Los Angeles, California.

No Way Out was a professional wrestling pay-per-view (PPV) event first held by World Wrestling Entertainment (WWE) as the 20th In Your House PPV event in February 1998. Following the discontinuation of the In Your House series in February 1999, No Way Out was reinstated in February 2000 as its own PPV event, thus establishing it as the annual February PPV for the promotion. The ninth event was held on February 18, 2007, at the Staples Center in Los Angeles, California. Like the previous three years's events, the 2007 event featured wrestlers exclusively from the SmackDown! brand.

=== Storylines ===
The event featured eight professional wrestling matches that resulted from scripted storylines. Results were predetermined by WWE's writers on the SmackDown! brand, while storylines were produced on WWE's weekly television show, SmackDown!.

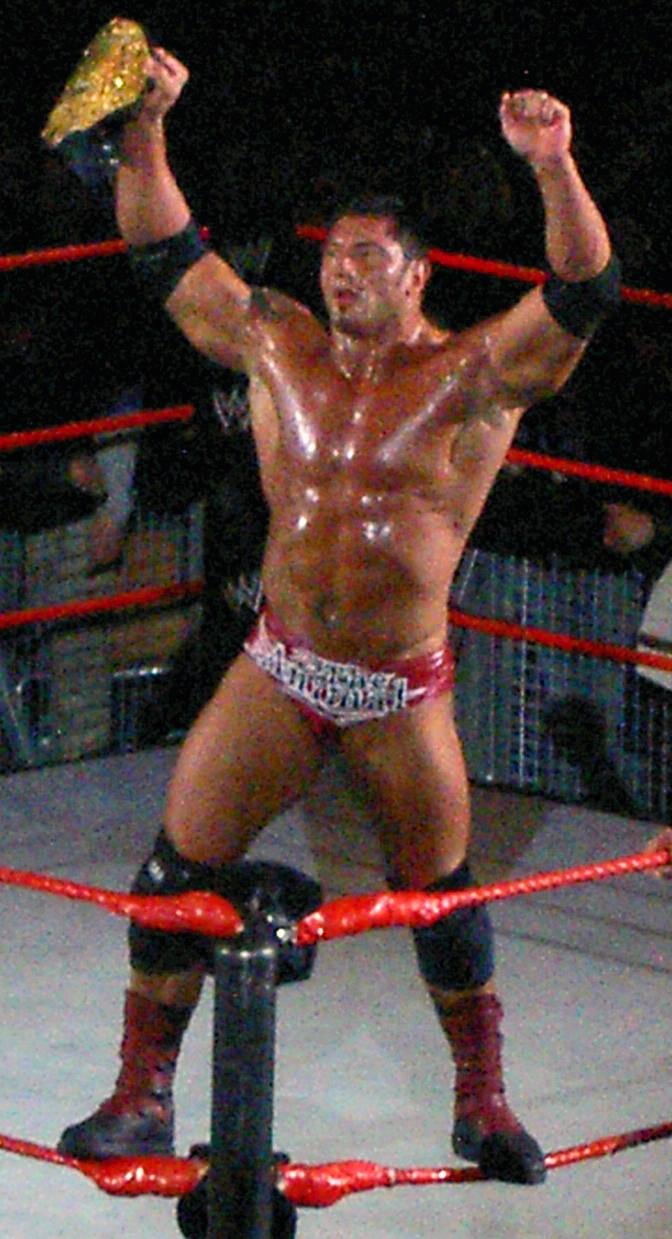
World Heavyweight Champion Batista teamed up with The Undertaker at this event

The main feud heading into No Way Out was between SmackDown!'s World Heavyweight Champion Batista and his partner, The Undertaker, and Raw's WWE Champion John Cena and Shawn Michaels. This feud began after The Undertaker won the 2007 Royal Rumble match. The following week on an episode of SmackDown!, the two world champions demanded an answer from The Undertaker as to who he would face at WrestleMania, but Michaels interfered, as he also wanted an answer from The Undertaker. As they awaited for The Undertaker's answer, Vince McMahon, the WWE Chairman, made an appearance and announced an interpromotional tag team match between the two pairs of brand representatives. On the February 5, 2007, episode of Raw, The Undertaker made his decision to face World Heavyweight Champion Batista at WrestleMania 23, sending a message through a chokeslam. Michaels then became Cena's challenger at WrestleMania 23 after winning a triple threat match against Randy Orton and Edge. On the February 15, 2007 episode of Raw, the brand representatives were pitted in an eight-man tag-team match against Rated-RKO (Orton and Edge), Mr. Kennedy, and Montel Vontavious Porter in which the brand representatives were victorious. The Raw representatives went on to win the World Tag Team Championship, although Michaels made many attempts to superkick Cena during the road to No Way Out. On the February 16 episode of SmackDown!, The Undertaker and Batista again teamed up to face Rated-RKO and were victorious via pinfall.

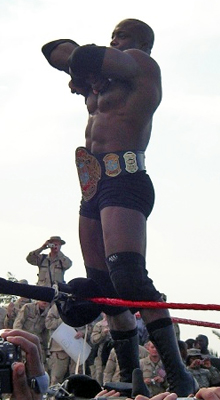
Bobby Lashley, the ECW World Champion heading into the event

The secondary feud heading into No Way Out was between Chris Benoit and The Hardys against MNM and Montel Vontavious Porter (at show, MVP). This feud began shortly after MNM reformed, when they challenged the reunited Hardys at December to Dismember in a losing effort. They then continued to wrestle on episodes of Raw, ECW, and SmackDown! until Armageddon, when Mercury suffered a legitimate severe facial injury. On the February 16 episode of SmackDown!, SmackDown General manager Theodore Long announced a ladder match between Paul London and Brian Kendrick, Dave Taylor and William Regal, MNM, and The Hardys for the WWE Tag Team Championship (the same match all four teams had against each other at Armageddon), but WWE's official website announced the match had changed to pit The Hardys and Chris Benoit against MNM and MVP, while Brian Kendrick and Paul London faced Deuce 'n Domino in a separate match. Benoit and MVP were added to the match on short notice, as they were not feuding at the time.

The third feud heading into No Way Out was between Kane and King Booker. This feud began during the 2007 Royal Rumble match when Kane eliminated King Booker from the match, but King Booker returned unofficially to eliminate Kane. The feud continued on the February 2 episode of SmackDown! during King Booker's Key to the City ceremony in Houston, Texas, when Kane interrupted the ceremony and attacked King Booker. After they continued to feud during the weeks leading up to No Way Out, Theodore Long booked a match between the two at No Way Out. On the February 16 episode of SmackDown!, King Booker mocked Kane by dishonestly reviewing Kane's See No Evil movie, but King Booker ran out when Kane came in to attack him.

The fourth feud heading into No Way Out was between Bobby Lashley and Mr. Kennedy. This feud began on the February 16 episode of SmackDown! when Lashley made a guest appearance to visit Theodore Long. Mr. Kennedy voiced his opinion to Lashley, reminding Lashley that he had beaten him before and claiming that he could to it again. Long then scheduled a match between the two for the ECW World Championship at No Way Out after contacting ECW officials.

== Event ==
Other on-screen personnel
Role:	Name:
English commentators	Michael Cole
English commentators	John "Bradshaw" Layfield
Spanish commentators	Hugo Savinovich
Spanish commentators	Carlos Cabrera
Interviewer	Kristal Marshall
Ring announcer	Tony Chimel
Referees	Charles Robinson
Referees	Jim Korderas
Referees	Chris Kay
Referees	Mickie Henson

Before the event aired live on pay-per-view, a dark match between Rob Van Dam and Shelton Benjamin took place. Van Dam won the match by pinning Benjamin after performing a Five-star frog splash.

=== Preliminary matches ===
The first match that aired was the six-man tag team match between the team of The Hardys (Matt Hardy and Jeff Hardy) and Chris Benoit and the team of MNM (Johnny Nitro and Joey Mercury) and Montel Vontavious Porter (MVP). The match began with MVP and Benoit, and Benoit gained the early advantage over MVP. The Hardys and Benoit remained with the advantage until MNM got involved in the match. MNM illegally double teamed The Hardys while the referee was distracted. Benoit was then tagged into the match, and MNM attempted to perform a Snapshot on Benoit. Benoit, however, countered the maneuver into a Crippler crossface on Mercury, who submitted, meaning The Hardys and Benoit won the match.

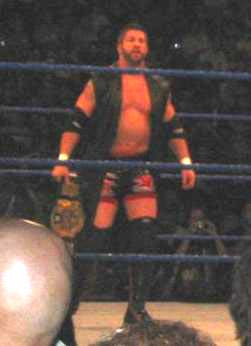
Gregory Helms as Cruiserweight Champion heading into the event

The next match was a Cruiserweight Open for the WWE Cruiserweight Championship. The match began with Scotty 2 Hotty against Daivari; Scotty eliminated Daivari via pinfall after performing the Worm. The Cruiserweight Champion, Gregory Helms, then entered the match and eliminated Scotty via pinfall after he performed a Double knee facebreaker on Scotty. Funaki was the next participant to enter the match; however, he was eliminated via pinfall after Helms executed a crossbody into a pin while holding onto Funaki's tights. Shannon Moore was the fifth entrant into the gauntlet, but was eliminated via pinfall after Helms performed a Double knee facebreaker on him. Jimmy Wang Yang, the sixth entrant, eliminated Helms via pinfall after performing a Hurricanrana pin. Jamie Noble was the seventh entrant into the Gauntlet match, but he was eliminated via pinfall after Yang performed a moonsault into a pin. The final entrant, Chavo Guerrero, pinned Yang after a frog splash, thus winning the title.

The third match was a mixed tag team match between the team of Finlay and Little Bastard and the team of The Boogeyman and Little Boogeyman. The match started off with Finlay against The Boogeyman while Little Bastard hid under the ring. Finlay gained the advantage over Little Boogeyman as he threw him over the top rope onto ringside, where Little Bastard pulled Little Boogeyman under the ring. As Little Bastard finally entered into the ring, he ran out to ringside in fear of The Boogeyman, which led to The Boogeyman chasing him around the ring. This distracted the referee, allowing Finlay to hit Little Boogeyman with a shillelagh and pin him for the win.

The next match was the encounter between King Booker and Kane. The match started off with Kane gaining the advantage over King Booker, which he held throughout the beginning of the match. Kane then attempted a chokeslam, but King Booker countered the maneuver into a Scissors kick attempt but Kane countered with a clothesline. Queen Sharmell, who was at ringside in King Booker's corner, distracted Kane, allowing King Booker to execute a heel kick. Kane retaliated by performing a chokeslam on King Booker for the win.

In the fifth match Paul London and Brian Kendrick faced Deuce 'n Domino for the WWE Tag Team Championship. There was back and forth action between the teams in the beginning of the match; however, Deuce 'n Domino gained the advantage over Kendrick and London, as they focused on wearing down London, not allowing him to tag in his partner. London was eventually able to tag Kendrick into the match, after which Domino attempted an aerial attack from the top rope. He missed Kendrick with the attack, however, allowing Kendrick to roll him up for the pin. In result, London and Kendrick won the match and retained the WWE Tag Team Championship.

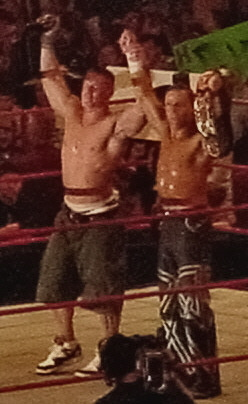
World Tag Team Champions and Raw representatives John Cena and Shawn Michaels at this event

The sixth match was an ECW World Championship match between defending champion Bobby Lashley and Mr. Kennedy. As Lashley made his entrance towards the ring, Kennedy attacked Lashley in the aisle, delaying the start of the match. When Lashley and Kennedy finally entered the ring, Kennedy attempted many submission holds to no avail, but he continued to attack Lashley in an attempt to keep him from getting up. Kennedy then left the ring to get a steel chair, but Lashley took the chair and attacked Kennedy with it, which caused the referee to end the match as a result of a disqualification. Kennedy won the match, but due to WWE rules, Lashley retained the ECW World Championship. After the match, Lashley hit Kennedy with a steel chair repeatedly until WWE officials ran in to control Lashley.

After the sixth match, there was a Diva Talent Invitational hosted by The Miz, featuring divas from SmackDown! and Raw as well as vixens from ECW. First, Extreme Expose (Layla, Kelly Kelly and Brooke) danced to Rich Boy's "Boy Looka Here". Next, Jillian Hall sang a song, but The Miz stopped her from continuing. Candice Michelle, Ariel, and Maria came out next, but before they presented their talent, a catfight broke out among the three divas. Ashley then came out, but before she made her way down to the ring, she took her top off to reveal her breasts covered with pasties in the form of the Playboy logo. The Miz then declared Ashley the winner of the Diva Talent Invitational.

=== Main event match ===
The main event was an inter-promotional tag-team match between SmackDown!'s Batista and The Undertaker and Raw's John Cena and Shawn Michaels. The match started off with Cena and Batista, and Batista gained the advantage over Cena. The Undertaker and Batista then continued to wear down Cena and Michaels before throwing them over the top rope to ringside. As Cena returned into the ring, he attempted to perform an FU on Batista but The Undertaker interfered, allowing Batista to counter the maneuver into a Batista Bomb attempt but Cena countered after Michaels interfered. As Batista gave Michaels a Spinebuster, The Undertaker executed a chokeslam on Cena. The Undertaker then prepared to perform a Tombstone piledriver on Cena, but Batista turned on The Undertaker by performing a Spinebuster on him and exited the ring. Michaels performed Sweet Chin Music and Cena to execute an FU on The Undertaker. Cena then pinned The Undertaker to win the match for his team.

== Aftermath ==
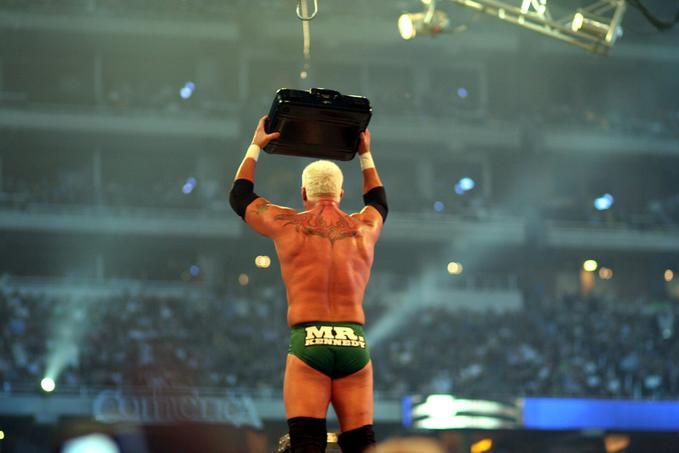
Mr. Kennedy winning the Money in the Bank ladder match at WrestleMania 23

After No Way Out, The Undertaker continued his feud with Batista over the World Heavyweight Championship. At WrestleMania 23, he pinned Batista to win the title. Shawn Michaels, however, was unable to win the WWE Championship, as he lost to John Cena at WrestleMania 23.

After Kane defeated King Booker at No Way Out, the two continued to feud on SmackDown! in a Money in the Bank qualifying match on February 23, 2007. The feud, however, ended after King Booker defeated Kane to qualify for the Money in the Bank ladder match. Kane then began a feud with The Great Khali, who came out to the ring to attack Kane after the match. At WrestleMania 23, however, Kane lost to Khali via pinfall.

After No Way Out, The Hardys qualified for the Money in the Bank ladder match at WrestleMania 23 but were unsuccessful in winning the match, as Mr. Kennedy won it. Chris Benoit and Montel Vontavious Porter (MVP) began a feud over the WWE United States Championship, and Benoit successfully defended his championship against MVP at WrestleMania 23. After No Way Out, MNM's reunion ended, as Joey Mercury was released by WWE on March 26, 2007. After Bobby Lashley was disqualified at No Way Out, he was chosen to represent Donald Trump at WrestleMania 23 against Vince McMahon's representative, Umaga, in the Battle of the Billionaires: Hair vs. Hair match. Lashley won the match at WrestleMania and the right for Trump to shave McMahon's head.

The 2007 No Way Out was the final brand-exclusive pay-per-view of the first brand extension, as following WrestleMania 23 in April, brand-exclusive pay-per-views were discontinued; the first brand extension itself ended in August 2011. It would also be the final brand-exclusive pay-per-view until Backlash in September 2016 when the brand split was reintroduced that year in July.

== Results ==
No.	Results	Stipulations	Times
1^{D}	Rob Van Dam defeated Shelton Benjamin by pinfall	Singles match	5:02
2	Chris Benoit and The Hardys (Matt Hardy and Jeff Hardy) defeated Montel Vontavious Porter and MNM (Joey Mercury and Johnny Nitro) (with Melina) by submission	Six-man tag team match	14:19
3	Chavo Guerrero defeated Scotty 2 Hotty, Daivari, Gregory Helms (c), Funaki, Shannon Moore, Jimmy Wang Yang and Jamie Noble	Cruiserweight Open for the WWE Cruiserweight Championship	14:11
4	Finlay and Little Bastard defeated The Boogeyman and Little Boogeyman by pinfall	Mixed tag team match	6:44
5	Kane defeated King Booker (with Queen Sharmell) by pinfall	Singles match	12:38
6	Paul London and Brian Kendrick (c) defeated Deuce 'n Domino (with Cherry) by pinfall	Tag team match for the WWE Tag Team Championship	8:07
7	Mr. Kennedy defeated Bobby Lashley (c) by Disqualification	Singles match for the ECW World Championship	15:27
8	Ashley defeated Jillian Hall, Kelly Kelly, Layla and Brooke Adams	Diva Talent Invitational	9:40
9	John Cena and Shawn Michaels (Raw) defeated Batista and The Undertaker (SmackDown!) by pinfall	Tag team match	22:09
(c) / – the champion(s) heading into the match; D / – this was a dark match

=== Cruiserweight Open eliminations ===
Elimination no.	Wrestler	Eliminated by	Elimination move	Time
1	Daivari	Scotty 2 Hotty	Worm	01:39
2	Scotty 2 Hotty	Gregory Helms	Double knee facebreaker	03:30
3	Funaki	Gregory Helms	Roll-up	03:50
4	Shannon Moore	Gregory Helms	Double knee facebreaker	05:40
5	Gregory Helms	Jimmy Wang Yang	Hurricanranra then Roll-up	07:20
6	Jamie Noble	Jimmy Wang Yang	Yang Time	10:44
7	Jimmy Wang Yang	Chavo Guerrero	Frog splash	14:11
Winner:	Chavo Guerrero			

== Other on-screen personnel ==
Commentators

- Michael Cole
- John "Bradshaw" Layfield
- Carlos Cabrera
- Hugo Savinovich

Ring announcer

- Tony Chimel

Interviewers

- Kristal Marshall

Referees

- Charles Robinson
- Jimmy Korderas
- Chris Kay
- Mickie Henson
