= Drop (Rich Boy song) =

Single by Rich Boy featuring Polow da Don

from the album Buried Alive (Unreleased)
- Released: January 20, 2009
- Recorded: 2009
- Genre: Hip hop
- Length: 3:45
- Label: Interscope, Zone 4
- Songwriter(s): Marece Richards, Charles Hester, Jamal Jones
- Producer(s): Cha-Lo

Rich Boy featuring Polow da Don singles chronology
"Let's Get This Paper" (2007)	"Drop" (2009)	"Break the Pot" (2013)

"Drop" is a song by American rapper Rich Boy featuring Zone 4 label-head Polow da Don. Written by its performers and produced by Cha-Lo, "Drop" was released as a single on January 20, 2009 through Interscope Records. It was intended as a promotional single for his second studio album Buried Alive, which was ultimately never released.

The single charted on Billboard's Bubbling Under R&B/Hip-Hop Singles chart where it was peaked at #1 during the week of February 28, 2009.

The song is also known for being widely used by other rappers to freestyle over, including Kid Cudi, Cassidy, Childish Gambino, Jay Rock, as well as Earl Sweatshirt of OFWGKTA.

== Charts ==
Chart (2009)	Peak Position
US Billboard Hot R&B/Hip-Hop Songs	85
