= Polow da Don =

American record producer

- Also known as: Awesome Jones; Shorty Pimp
- Born: Jamal Fincher Jones; October 15, 1977 or 1978 (age 47–48)
- Origin: Atlanta, Georgia, U.S.
- Genres: Southern hip-hop; R&B
- Occupations: Record producer; rapper; songwriter; singer; hype man
- Years active: 1997–present
- Labels: Zone 4; Interscope
- Formerly of: Jim Crow

Jamal Fincher Jones (born October 15, 1977 or 1978), known professionally as Polow da Don, is an American record producer and rapper from Atlanta, Georgia. He began his career as a recording artist in the late 1990s, leaving college to pursue a career with the short-lived hip hop group Jim Crow. They signed with Epic Records in 1999 and released two albums—Crow's Nest (1999) and Right Quick (2001)—before being dropped from the label.

Although disappointed, Jones formed a Southern hip-hop group with Bubba Sparxxx, Sean P, Pastor Troy, G Rock, and Timbaland, but they split up without any releases. Jones began producing instrumentals in 2001. His first beat tape made its way to Interscope Records founder, Jimmy Iovine, and its contents were ultimately used for the singles "Runaway Love" by Ludacris, "Buttons" by the Pussycat Dolls, and "This Is the Life" by Tru-Life.

Since then, Jones has produced numerous hit singles for various artists, including "Love in This Club" for Usher (2008), "Glamorous", "London Bridge" and "M.I.L.F. $" for Fergie (2006, 2016), "Anaconda" for Nicki Minaj (2014), "Forever" for Chris Brown (2008), "Baby by Me" for 50 Cent (2009), "Throw Some D's" for Rich Boy (2007), "Promise" for Ciara (2006), and "John" for Lil Wayne (2011), among others; three of these have peaked atop the Billboard Hot 100. Also a hype man, Jones's backing vocals can be heard on many of his productions.

Jones founded the record label Zone 4, which was briefly an imprint of Iovine's Interscope Records label and named after a section in his Atlanta hometown. Established in 2007, its roster included Southern hip-hop and R&B acts including Keri Hilson, Lloyd, Kane Brown, Ayo & Teo, Roscoe Dash, Veronica Vega, Rich Boy, and Ester Dean among others. Outside of music, Jones has ventured into local radio broadcasting, and launched his own line of alcoholic beverages in 2022.

== Discography ==
=== Selected production credits ===
- 2004: "Fallen (Zone 4 remix)" (Mýa feat. Chingy)
- 2005: "Pimpin' All Over the World" (Ludacris feat. Bobby Valentino) (#9 US)
- 2005: "Party Starter" (Will Smith)
- 2006: "Promise" (Ciara) (#11 US)
- 2006: "London Bridge" (Fergie) (#1 US)
- 2006: "DJ Play a Love Song" (Jamie Foxx feat. Twista)
- 2006: "Blindfold Me" (Kelis feat. Nas)
- 2006: "Runaway Love" (Ludacris feat. Mary J. Blige) (#2 US)
- 2006: "Buttons" (Pussycat Dolls feat. Snoop Dogg) (#3 US)
- 2007: "Glamorous" (Fergie feat. Ludacris) (#1 US)
- 2007: "Like This" (Kelly Rowland feat. Eve) (#14 US)
- 2007: "Crying Out for Me" (Mario)
- 2007: "Whatever U Like" (Nicole Scherzinger feat. T.I.)
- 2007: "Boy Looka Here" (Rich Boy)
- 2007: "Let's Get This Paper" (Rich Boy)
- 2007: "Throw Some D's" (Rich Boy feat. Polow da Don) (#6 US)
- 2007: "She's a Star" (will.i.am)
- 2007: "Get Buck" (Young Buck)
- 2007: "Lost In Love" (I-15)
- 2008: "Forever" (Chris Brown) (#2 US)
- 2008: "My Heart" (Jennifer Hudson)
- 2008: "Get Your Money Up" (Keri Hilson feat. Keyshia Cole & Trina)
- 2008: "Turnin Me On" (Keri Hilson feat. Lil Wayne) (#15 US)
- 2008: "Make Me Over" (Keyshia Cole)
- 2008: "Hero" (Nas feat. Keri Hilson)
- 2008: "Lie" (Nelly)
- 2008: "One & Only" (Nelly)
- 2008: "Party People" (Nelly feat. Fergie)
- 2008: "Problems" (Nelly)
- 2008: "Single" (New Kids on the Block feat. Ne-Yo)
- 2008: "Whatcha Think About That" (Pussycat Dolls feat. Missy Elliott)
- 2008: "Love in This Club" (Usher feat. Young Jeezy) (#1 US)
- 2009: "Baby by Me" (50 Cent feat. Ne-Yo)
- 2009: "Never, Ever" (Ciara feat. Young Jeezy)
- 2009: "Outta Here" (Esmée Denters produced with Justin Timberlake)
- 2009: "Drop It Low" (Ester Dean feat. Chris Brown)
- 2009: "Spotlight" (Gucci Mane feat. Usher)
- 2009: "Back to the Crib" (Juelz Santana feat. Chris Brown)
- 2009: "Stronger" (Mary J. Blige)
- 2009: "Patron Tequila" (Paradiso Girls feat. Lil Jon & Eve)
- 2009: "Medicine" (Plies feat. Keri Hilson)
- 2009: "Drop" (Rich Boy)
- 2009: "Yamaha Mama" (Soulja Boy)
- 2009: "Sex Therapy" (Robin Thicke)
- 2009: "Shakin' It 4 Daddy" (Robin Thicke feat. Nicki Minaj)
- 2009: "So Cold" (Chris Brown)
- 2009: "Wait" (Chris Brown feat Trey Songz & Game)
- 2009: "Remember Me" (T.I. feat. Mary J. Blige)
- 2010: "Lil' Freak" (Usher feat. Nicki Minaj)
- 2010: "Not Myself Tonight" (Christina Aguilera)
- 2010: "Woohoo" (Christina Aguilera feat. Nicki Minaj)
- 2010: "I Hate Boys" (Christina Aguilera)
- 2010: "Already Taken" (Trey Songz)
- 2010: "Fireworks" (R. Kelly)
- 2010: "Hot Tottie" (Usher feat. Jay-Z)
- 2010: "Let's Get It In" (Lloyd)
- 2010: "Lay It Down" (Lloyd)
- 2010: "Here I Am (Remix)" (Monica feat. Trey Songz)
- 2010: "The Way You Love Me" (Keri Hilson feat. Rick Ross)
- 2010: "In Love With You" (Jared Evan)
- 2010: "Heaven" (El DeBarge) (under the pseudonym Awesome Jones)
- 2010: "Fading" (Rihanna)
- 2010: "Long Gone" (Nelly feat. Plies & Chris Brown)
- 2011: "Cupid" (Lloyd)
- 2011: "Your Love" (Diddy – Dirty Money feat. Trey Songz)
- 2011: "Sex Your Body" (Mohombi)
- 2011: "John" (Lil Wayne feat. Rick Ross)
- 2011: "Take It Down Low" (Akon feat. Chris Brown)
- 2011: "Be the One" (Lloyd feat. Trey Songz & Young Jeezy)
- 2011: "My Kinda Girl" (Pitbull feat. Nelly)
- 2011: "Dedication to My Ex (Miss That)" (Lloyd feat. André 3000 & Lil Wayne)
- 2012: "Sweet Love" (Chris Brown)
- 2012: "Without You" (Monica)
- 2012: "Cyeah Cyeah Cyeah Cyeah" (Gucci Mane feat. Chris Brown & Lil Wayne)
- 2012: "Party Ain't Over" (Pitbull feat. Usher & Afrojack)
- 2013: "Ready to Go" (Limp Bizkit feat. Lil Wayne)
- 2013: "Somebody Else" (Mario feat. Nicki Minaj)
- 2013: "Wickedest Style" (Sean Paul feat. Iggy Azalea)
- 2014: "Sex You" (Bando Jonez)
- 2014: "Dynamite" (Afrojack feat. Snoop Dogg)
- 2014: "Anaconda" (Nicki Minaj) (#2 US)
- 2015: "That's How I'm Feelin'" (Ciara feat. Pitbull & Missy Elliott)
- 2015: "Stuck With Me" (Tamia)
- 2015: "Just Right for Me" (Monica feat. Lil Wayne)
- 2015: "Catfish" (Tamar Braxton)
- 2015: "Used to Love You Sober" (Kane Brown)
- 2015: "Code Red" (Monica feat. Missy Elliott & Laiyah)
- 2015: "Last Minute Late Night" (Kane Brown)
- 2016: "Dumb Love" (Akevius feat. Plies)
- 2016: "M.I.L.F. $" (Fergie)
- 2016: "Freedun" (M.I.A. feat. Zayn)
- 2016: "Wet" (Polow da Don feat. Bando Jonez & Saint LaRon)
- 2016: "Pull Up" (Summerella feat. Jacquees)

== Personal life ==
In September 2020, U.S. President Donald Trump gave Jones a shout-out at a rally in Atlanta. Jones later substantiated his support for the President with a video posted on Instagram.

== Awards ==
- 2007: Ozone Awards – Best Producer
- 2007: Ozone Awards – Club Banger of the Year ("Throw Some D's")
- 2008: BMI 56th Annual Pop Awards – Songwriter of the Year
- 2009: BMI 57th Annual Pop Awards – Songwriter of the Year
- 2009: BMI Urban Awards – Producer of the Year

== Broadcasting ==
In 2019, via his company Young Country Holdings, Jones entered the broadcasting industry by purchasing the Nashville-area radio station WYCZ and its FM translator for $100,000. On June 6, 2019, the station launched a new hybrid country, pop, and urban format curated by Jones, YoCo 96.7.
