= Boy Looka Here =

Single by Rich Boy

from the album Rich Boy
- B-side: "Throw Some D's" (remix)
- Released: February 14, 2007
- Recorded: 2006
- Length: 3:51
- Label: Interscope
- Songwriters: Marece Richards; Jamal Jones; Niqua Todd Jones
- Producer: Polow da Don

Rich Boy singles chronology
"Throw Some D's" (2006)	"Boy Looka Here" (2007)	"Sexy Lady" (remix) (2008)

Music video
- "Boy Looka Here" on YouTube

"Boy Looka Here" is the second single from the first album, Rich Boy, by rapper Rich Boy. The single was produced by Polow da Don. The video features the Omega Psi Phi, Tuskegee University and Alabama A&M University marching band. The song was used in an Extreme Exposé segment at World Wrestling Entertainment's pay-per-view No Way Out in February 2007. The song was also featured in the film Rocky Balboa. The video for the song was released in February 2007.

== Critical reception ==
Jonathan Ringen of Rolling Stone called it a "standout" on the album, praising Polow da Don for his ability to "mix[es] flamenco guitar, haunted-house synths and a Reznor-hard beat into a menacing banger". J-23 of HipHopDX put it alongside "Touch That Ass" as highlights that "display[s] Polow's dynamic production and Rich's style." Reptilia of AbsolutePunk called it "a fantastic marching band-based number and an interesting tribute to the South's love of marching bands and football."

== Remixes ==
- Remix featuring Ja Rule and Harry-O
- Remix featuring Rasheeda
- Freestyle by Joe Budden
- Freestyle by Crooked I and The Horshoe Gang

== Charts ==
Chart (2007)	Peak position
US Bubbling Under Hot 100 (Billboard)	16
US Hot R&B/Hip-Hop Songs (Billboard)	3
