= Break the Pot =

Studio album by Rich Boy
- Released: April 9, 2013
- Recorded: 2012–13
- Genre: Hip hop
- Length: 42:02
- Label: E1

Rich Boy chronology
Rich Boy (2007)	Break the Pot (2013)	Featuring (2015)

Singles from Break the Pot
- 1. "Break the Pot" Released: January 14, 2013

Break the Pot is the second studio album by the American rapper Rich Boy. The album was released on April 9, 2013, by E1 Music. The album features guest appearances from Mista Raja, Maino, Hemi, GQ Beats, Doe B, Playboi Lo, Smash, Maja, Kalenna Harper, Jue and Bobby V.

== Background ==
On January 14, 2013, the first single, "Break the Pot" featuring Hemi, was released to promote the album. On February 25, 2013, it was announced that the album would be released on April 9, 2013, and would feature guest appearances from Maino, Mista Raja, Bobby V, Doe B, Playboi Lo and Smash. On March 17, 2013, the music video for "Break the Pot" featuring Hemi was premiered on MTV Jams. On March 18, 2013, Rich Boy released the mixtape Back To Class to promote the album.

In March 2013, during an interview with HipHopDX, Rich Boy explained the meaning behind the album's title, saying: "I really just got that title from my partner. We were in New York and constantly recording and going back and forth to the studio. He used to joke that we’re about to go break the pot, so I just stuck with it ‘cause it really fit the situation of what I was trying to do musically."

== Track listing ==
No.	Title	Producer(s)	Length
1.	"Gangsta" (featuring Mista Raja)	Arthur McArthur	3:25
2.	"Break The Pot" (featuring Hemi)	Coalition Forces	3:51
3.	"Real Mutha Fucka" (featuring Maino, Hemi & Mista Raja)	Gnyus	3:59
4.	"She Do It"	Tarboy and JWhite	2:59
5.	"Monster" (featuring Mista Raja)	Coalition Forces	3:24
6.	"Go Hard" (featuring GQ Beats)	GQ Beats	3:22
7.	"Pimp On" (featuring Doe B, Playboi Lo & Smash)	D'Andre Gibson, Coalition Forces	4:00
8.	"Everything About You" (featuring Bobby V)	Coalition Forces	3:34
9.	"Fuckin Sum" (featuring Maja)	Maja	3:04
10.	"Kiss the Moment" (featuring Kalenna)	Tha Bizness	3:46
11.	"Glasses In The Air" (featuring Jue)	Rich Boy	3:16
12.	"Bitches and Bands"	Rich Boy	3:22
Total length:			42:02

== Charts ==
Chart (2013)	Peak position
US Top R&B/Hip-Hop Albums (Billboard)	39
