= Bando Jonez =

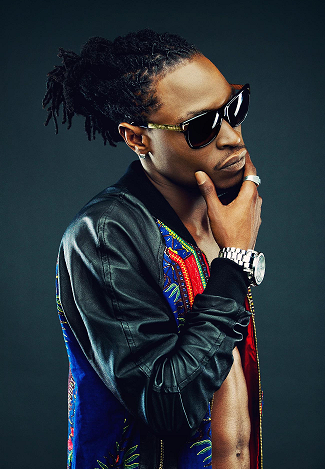

Background information
- Origin: Atlanta, Georgia
- Genre: R&B
- Occupation: Singer-songwriter
- Label: Zone 4

Corey Jerome Hodges, better known as Bando Jonez (formerly Lil' Corey), is a singer-songwriter and rapper from Atlanta, Georgia. He debuted in 2002 with "Hush Lil' Lady", a pop crossover hit which featured Lil' Romeo, which led to his full-length effort "I'm Just Corey", featuring the aforementioned lead single as well as "MVP" (featuring Shaquille O'Neal) and "All I Do" (featuring Michael Jackson).

His debut single "Sex You", (as Bando Jonez), received play at urban contemporary radio in early 2014.

== Early life ==
Jonez grew up in Atlanta in the 1990s. He taught himself how to play the piano by ear when he was 5 years old and first sang in front of an audience at a high school pep rally. He was forced to take care of himself due to his parents' drug addiction. Jonez would hustle for his everyday needs and often found shelter in abandoned houses, hence the name "Bando" which is slang for abandoned houses. He concentrated on music, filling up his free time by listening to music and watching videos.

== Career ==
Before taking the name Bando Jonez, he was known as Lil Corey and at age 13, he created a hit single "Hush Lil' Lady" (featuring Lil' Romeo), Which gained him much success leading to the release of his debut album I'm Just Corey on March 19, 2002, at age 13. The album spawned other single My First Time. One of the songs from the album "Ghetto Superstar" was also included on the album "Madison Mix" which was released to promote the My Scene dolls.

In 2008, Hodges released the song "Say Yes", the first song since his long break. The song was a major hit and had much success on the internet but again he took a break from music only to come back in 2011. He relaunched his career along with his company (Fast Money Gang Music). With the management of "Muzic Leakz Management", he re-released his 2008 hit "Say Yes" along with 6 new songs "Make Love, All Night, Cant Lose You, D.N.A, Your Body, Give It All To Me" in his official promotional page on Reverberation. The Hip-Hop group Pretty Ricky did a remix for Lil Corey's "Say Yes" in 2011 for their Mixtape "SEX MUSIC Vol. 1 Streets N The Sheets" available for free on Datpiff. In addition to his official promotional page on Reverbnation.

Hodges was re-discovered by Polow da Don in 2013. It was a chance meeting at a gas station where Jonez displayed his talent for Polow who ultimately signed him to Zone 4. Jonez also signed with Epic Records after the release of his first single, Sex You. The single was featured as one of Complex Magazine's Best New Songs in 2014. Jonez style has been described as slow R&B with him having the ability to infuse notes and lyrics with raw emotion.

== Discography ==
=== Singles ===
Title	Song details	Peak positions
Title	Song details	US R&B
Sex You	Release date: January 15, 2014; Album: TBA	31

== See also ==
- List of Epic Records artists
- Music of Atlanta
