= The Otha Side of the Trap =

Studio album by OJ da Juiceman
- Released: January 27, 2009
- Recorded: 2006–2008
- Genre: Southern hip-hop
- Labels: Warner Bros. Records, Asylum Records, 1017 Brick Squad, Mizay
- Producers: Zaytoven, FATBOI, DJ Speedy

Singles from The Otha Side of the Trap
- 1. "Make tha Trap Say Aye" Released: December 1, 2008

The Otha Side of the Trap is the debut studio album by southern rapper OJ da Juiceman. The album was released on January 27, 2009. The album contains some old mixtape songs and also includes a DVD.

== Track listing ==
No.	Title	Producer(s)	Length
1.	"I Be Trappin'"	Zaytoven	2:17
2.	"Good Night" (featuring Gucci Mane)	DJ Speedy	4:03
3.	"Hell of a Life"	Zaytoven	4:23
4.	"Nah Ming"	Zaytoven	3:08
5.	"Batman"	FATBOI	4:08
6.	"I'm Gettin' Money"	Zaytoven	4:47
7.	"Washing Powder Money"	FATBOI	3:51
8.	"Make tha Trap Say Aye" (featuring Gucci Mane)	Zaytoven	4:18
9.	"50 Bricks"	Zaytoven	3:56
10.	"Yung Juice"	Zaytoven	3:35
11.	"Old School Cars"	Zaytoven	4:19
12.	"Cop a Chicken"	Zaytoven	1:47
13.	"Banker" (featuring Kourtney Money)	Zaytoven	4:14
14.	"Bouldercrest"	FATBOI	4:05
15.	"Trap Work"	DJ Speedy	4:05
16.	"OJ Flyest"	DJ Speedy	4:11
17.	"Yeah" (featuring Kourtney Money, Wooh Da Kid & Meta)	DJ Speedy	4:31
