= Change Clothes =

Single by Jay-Z

from the album The Black Album
- Released: November 4, 2003
- Recorded: 2003
- Studio: Baseline Studios, NYC by Gimel "Young Guru" Keaton for Loreal Inc.
- Genre: Hip-hop; R&B
- Length: 4:18
- Label: Roc-A-Fella; Def Jam
- Songwriters: Shawn Carter; Pharrell Williams; Charles Hugo
- Producer: The Neptunes

Jay-Z singles chronology
| "Frontin'" (2003) | "Change Clothes" (2003) | "Dirt off Your Shoulder" (2004) |

Music video
- "Change Clothes" on YouTube

"Change Clothes" is the first official single from rapper Jay-Z's studio album The Black Album. It featured additional vocals by Pharrell Williams (uncredited) and was produced by The Neptunes. The song reached No. 10 on the Billboard Hot 100 in December, 2003.

In Danger Mouse's Grey Album remix, the cello and harpsichord arrangement from "Piggies", from the Beatles album The Beatles (more commonly known as The White Album), is mixed with this song.

== Music video ==
The video directed by Chris Robinson features appearances from Russell Simmons, Kimora Lee Simmons, Memphis Bleek, Mary J. Blige, Beanie Sigel, talk show host Kelly Ripa, her husband, actor Mark Consuelos, models Naomi Campbell, Jessica White, Liliana Dominguez, Jade Cole, D. Woods, singer Omahyra Mota, Will Hoar, Mey Bun and rapper Mos Def.

== Track listing ==
=== CD single, Pt. 1 ===
1. "Change Clothes"
2. "What More Can I Say"

=== CD single, Pt. 2 ===
1. "Change Clothes"
2. "Excuse Me Miss"
3. "I Just Wanna Luv U (Give It 2 Me)"
4. "Change Clothes" (Video)

== Charts ==
=== Weekly charts ===
| Chart (2003–2004) | Peak position |
|---|---|
| Australia (ARIA) | 46 |
| Australian Urban (ARIA) | 17 |
| Belgium (Ultratip Bubbling Under Flanders) | 3 |
| Germany (GfK) | 54 |
| Ireland (IRMA) | 48 |
| Netherlands (Dutch Top 40) | 18 |
| Netherlands (Single Top 100) | 40 |
| New Zealand (Recorded Music NZ) | 42 |
| Scotland Singles (OCC) | 45 |
| Switzerland (Schweizer Hitparade) | 44 |
| UK Singles (OCC) | 32 |
| UK Hip Hop/R&B (OCC) | 5 |
| US Billboard Hot 100 | 10 |
| US Hot R&B/Hip-Hop Songs (Billboard) | 6 |
| US Pop Airplay (Billboard) | 33 |
| US Hot Rap Songs (Billboard) | 2 |
| US Rhythmic Airplay (Billboard) | 13 |

=== Year-end charts ===
| Chart (2004) | Position |
|---|---|
| US Billboard Hot 100 | 91 |
| US Hot R&B/Hip-Hop Songs (Billboard) | 54 |

== See also ==
- List of songs recorded by Jay-Z
