= Throw Some D's =

Single by Rich Boy featuring Polow da Don

from the album Rich Boy
- Released: August 15, 2006
- Recorded: 2006
- Genre: Hip hop
- Length: 4:23 (album version); 3:45 (radio edit)
- Label: Interscope
- Songwriters: Marece Richards; Robert Crawford; Jamal Jones; R. DeBarge; G. Williams
- Producers: Robert "Butta" Crawford; Polow da Don

Rich Boy singles chronology
"Throw Some D's" (2006)	"Boy Looka Here" (2007)

Music video
- "Throw Some D's on YouTube

Alternative cover

"Throw Some D's" is a song by American rapper Rich Boy, released by Zone 4 and Interscope Records on August 15, 2006 as the lead single from his self-titled debut studio album (2006). The song was produced by Butta and co-produced by Zone 4 label head Polow da Don, who co-wrote and guest appears on the song.

"Throw Some D's" peaked at number six on the Billboard Hot 100 and received platinum certification by the Recording Industry Association of America (RIAA). It has yielded the furthest commercial success for both Rich Boy and Polow da Don, becoming both artists' only entry on the chart as performers. The song ranked number 37 on Rolling Stone's list of the 100 Best Songs of 2007.

== Content ==
The production of "Throw Some D's" is built on a sample of the 1979 song "I Call Your Name" by R&B group Switch, which is mainly heard in the song's intro. Upon that sample, producer Polow da Don added numerous layers of synthesizers and 808 drums to produce the final beat. Jayson Greene of Pitchfork states that "every millisecond of the track is imprinted with an effect", and hypothesizes that "no [other] rap song is as full of detail". Rich Boy's lyrics on the track have been described as a "hood n**** [sic] success anthem". His delivery has been praised for its unpredictable cadence, its juxtaposition against the beat, and the stylistic effect of his Southern accent.

== Music video ==
The music video was directed by Bernard Gourley and released in October 2006. It was in heavy rotation on BET and MTV. Both rappers are seen performing the song, while Zone 4 labelmate Keri Hilson appears in a cameo.

== Legacy ==
Upon release, "Throw Some D's" quickly became the subject of numerous remixes. The song has also been described as influential upon many following hip-hop artists, including producers such as Zaytoven and Young Chop as well as rappers like GloRilla and Rae Sremmurd.

=== Remixes ===
- The official remix was produced by Lil Jon and it features André 3000, Jim Jones, Nelly, Murphy Lee, and the Game.
- Kanye West released a remix of the song, including a separate interlude off his mixtape Can't Tell Me Nothing: The Official Mixtape. A music video was released via West's website.
- Lil Wayne released a remix of the track on his mixtape Da Drought 3.

== Chart performance ==
The song peaked on the U.S. Billboard Hot 100 and peaked at number 6 in March 2007. The track saw success on the Hot R&B/Hip-Hop Songs and Hot Rap Tracks charts, where it peaked at numbers three and two, respectively.

=== Weekly charts ===
Chart (2006–2007)	Peak position
Finland (Suomen virallinen lista)	9
US Billboard Hot 100	6
US Hot R&B/Hip-Hop Songs (Billboard)	3
US Hot Rap Songs (Billboard)	2
US Rhythmic Airplay (Billboard)	9

=== Year-end charts ===
Chart (2007)	Peak position
US Billboard Hot 100	73
US Hot R&B/Hip-Hop Songs (Billboard)	18
US Rap Songs (Billboard)	14

== Release history ==
Region	Date	Format(s)	Label(s)	Ref.
United States	December 11, 2006	Rhythmic contemporary radio	Zone 4, Interscope	
United States	March 27, 2007	Contemporary hit radio	Zone 4, Interscope	
