= OJ da Juiceman =

American rapper (born 1981)

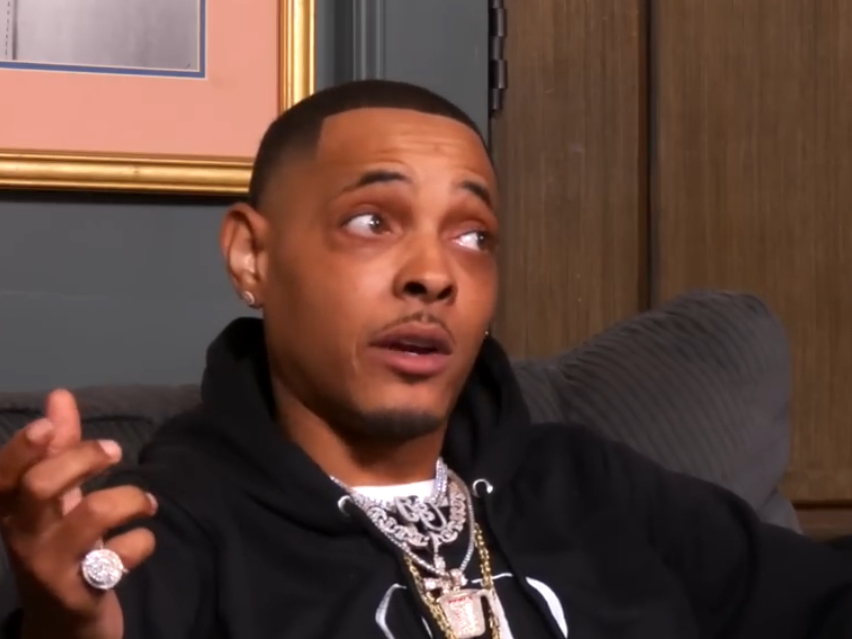
- OJ da Juiceman in 2022

Background information
- Born: Otis Whitfield Williams Jr. November 23, 1981 (age 44)
- Origin: Atlanta, Georgia, U.S.
- Genres: Southern hip-hop; trap
- Occupation: Rapper
- Works: OJ da Juiceman discography
- Years active: 2003–present
- Labels: 32; 101 Distribution; 1017; Asylum; So Icey; Mizay; Never Again

Otis Whitfield Williams Jr. (born November 23, 1981), known professionally as OJ da Juiceman, is an American rapper. He is best known for his 2008 single "Make tha Trap Say Aye" (featuring Gucci Mane), which entered the Bubbling Under Hot 100. The following year, he signed with Asylum Records to release his debut studio album The Otha Side of the Trap (2009), which failed to chart.

== Personal life ==
=== Early life ===
Otis Williams Jr. was raised by a single mother in East Atlanta. During the early 1990s, Williams met fellow Southern rapper Gucci Mane who lived in the same apartment buildings with whom he would later collaborate as OJ da Juiceman. Juiceman began his music career with "Never Again Records", widely known for their 2004 Summer spin-off hit "Black Tee". Following the creation of his own label 32 Entertainment, he partnered up with Gucci Mane CEO of So Icey Entertainment. OJ released 6 mixtapes under 32 Entertainment and has been featured on many underground mixtapes featuring various artists.

== Music career ==
=== 2006–2010: The Otha Side of the Trap ===
OJ da Juiceman was shot eight times on April 4, 2009, and performed a show that same week. The shooting has since left him with a permanent limp. After releasing over a dozen mixtapes hosted by such DJs as DJ Drama, Trap-a-Holics, DJ Holiday, DJ 5150, OJ da Juiceman founded the vanity label 32 Entertainment and signed to the Asylum Records in 2009. OJ's Asylum debut, The Otha Side of the Trap, contained both new tracks and previously released mixtape tracks. The album included the single "I'm Gettin' Money" and another that featured Gucci Mane, "Make tha Trap Say Aye". OJ also appeared on Jadakiss's single "Who's Real" and R. Kelly's "Supaman High" and has a mixtape with DJ Holiday called Alaska in Atlanta.

=== 2010–present: The Otis Williams Jr. Story ===
OJ's second album was revealed to be titled The Otis Williams Jr. Story. In 2011 & 2012 OJ released a slew of mixtapes, while he promoted his independent label 32 Entertainment. His most recent mixtape was 6 Ringz 2 (The Playoffs Edition) released on March 2, 2013. The mixtape featured guest appearances from Young Scooter, Gorilla Zoe and others. Production was handled by Lex Luger, Metro Boomin, and 808 Mafia. After getting in a Twitter feud with Gucci Mane in September 2013, OJ Da Juiceman revealed he had never been officially signed to 1017 Brick Squad. On September 20, 2013, OJ da Juiceman revealed that The Otis Williams Jr. Story would be released digitally on November 23, 2013, by 32 Entertainment. On February 11, 2014, OJ da Juiceman released the mixtape "Alaska in Atlanta 2" Hosted by DJ Holiday. On March 4, 2024, OJ da Juiceman was arrested for drug trafficking and gun charges after leading police on a car chase.

== Other ventures ==
=== 32 Entertainment ===
32 Entertainment is an Atlanta-based record label formed in 2007 by OJ da Juiceman. It is currently operating independently.

== Discography ==
Studio albums

- The Otha Side of the Trap (2009)
- The Otis Williams Jr. Story (2014)
