= Make tha Trap Say Aye =

"Make Tha Trap Say Aye"

Single by OJ da Juiceman featuring Gucci Mane

from the album The Otha Side of the Trap
- Released: 2008
- Recorded: 2007
- Genre: Gangsta rap, trap
- Length: 4:18
- Label: So Icey Ent./Mizay/Asylum Records
- Songwriters: Otis Williams, Radric Davis
- Producer: Zaytoven

OJ da Juiceman singles chronology
| "I'm Gettin' Money" (2008) | "Make Tha Trap Say Aye" (2008) | "Stupid" (2009) |

Gucci Mane singles chronology
| "Freaky Gurl" (2007) | "Make Tha Trap Say Aye" (2008) | "Stoopid" (2009) |

"Make tha Trap Say Aye" is a song by American rapper OJ da Juiceman. It was released as his commercial debut single and included on his debut album, The Otha Side of the Trap. The song also features fellow Atlanta-based rapper and label-mate Gucci Mane. The song deals with drugs and dealing drugs.

== Music video ==
OJ is seen rapping in a traphouse with Gucci Mane in front of a bunch of Atlanta-based rappers. Gucci is then seen rapping in front of a store & with OJ. Cameo appearances in the video include Nicki Minaj, Waka Flocka Flame, Frenchie, Wooh da Kid, Kayo Redd, and Shawty Lo.

== Remixes and freestyles ==
The official remix features Cam'ron and Tony Yayo. Rick Ross has also made a freestyle over the song.

== Chart performance ==
=== Weekly charts ===
| Chart (2009) | Peak Position |
|---|---|
| U.S. Billboard Bubbling Under Hot 100 Singles | 8 |
| U.S. Billboard Hot R&B/Hip-Hop Songs | 22 |
| U.S. Billboard Rap Songs | 13 |

=== Year-end charts ===
| Chart (2009) | Position |
|---|---|
| US Hot R&B/Hip-Hop Songs (Billboard) | 88 |
