= The Black Album (Jay-Z album) =

Studio album by Jay-Z
- Released: November 14, 2003
- Recorded: July–October 2003
- Studios: Baseline (New York); Hit Factory Criteria (Miami); The Mansion (Los Angeles); 54 Sound (Ferndale, Michigan)
- Genre: East Coast hip-hop
- Length: 55:32
- Labels: Roc-A-Fella; Island Def Jam
- Producers: Shawn Carter; 3H; 9th Wonder; Aqua; The Buchanans; Eminem; DJ Quik; Just Blaze; Kanye West; Luis Resto; The Neptunes; Rick Rubin; Timbaland

Jay-Z chronology
The Blueprint 2: The Gift & the Curse (2002)	The Black Album (2003)	Unfinished Business (2004)

Singles from The Black Album
- 1. "Change Clothes" Released: November 4, 2003; 2. "Dirt off Your Shoulder" Released: March 2, 2004; 3. "99 Problems" Released: April 27, 2004

The Black Album is the eighth studio album by American rapper Jay-Z, released on November 14, 2003, through Roc-A-Fella Records and The Island Def Jam Music Group. It was advertised as his final album before retiring, which is also a recurring theme throughout the songs, although Jay-Z resumed his recording career in 2005. For the album, Jay-Z wanted to enlist a different producer for each song, working with Just Blaze, Kanye West, the Neptunes, Eminem, DJ Quik, Timbaland, 9th Wonder and Rick Rubin, among others. The album also features an uncredited guest appearance by Pharrell Williams.

The Black Album was promoted with a retirement tour by Jay-Z. It was also supported by three singles: "99 Problems", also the Billboard top-ten hits "Change Clothes" and "Dirt off Your Shoulder". The album received widespread acclaim from music critics and was a massive commercial success. It debuted at number one on the US Billboard 200, selling 463,000 copies in its first week. It became Jay-Z's top selling record of the 2000s decade, and was certified quadruple platinum by the Recording Industry Association of America (RIAA) in 2023. The songs "Encore", "Dirt off Your Shoulder", and "99 Problems" are all on the mashup EP, Collision Course with Linkin Park. In 2004, American musician Danger Mouse released The Grey Album, a mashup/remix album which features the vocals of The Black Album and the instrumental of The Beatles' self-titled album, colloquially known as the "White Album", which became as controversial as the original album.

== Critical reception ==
Professional ratings
Aggregate scores
Source	Rating
Metacritic	84/100
Review scores
Source	Rating
AllMusic	5/5 stars
Entertainment Weekly	B+
The Guardian	2/5 stars
Mojo	5/5 stars
MSN Music (Expert Witness)	A
NME	8/10
Pitchfork	8.0/10
Q	4/5 stars
Rolling Stone	4/5 stars
USA Today	4/4 stars

According to the review aggregator Metacritic, The Black Album received "universal acclaim" based on a weighted average score of 84 out of 100 from 19 critic scores. AllMusic's John Bush claimed Jay-Z was retiring at his peak with the album. Vibe magazine said it was remarkable as an apotheosis of his genuinely thoughtful songwriting and lyrics "delivered with transcendent skill", while Steve Jones from USA Today said even with "top-shelf work" from elite producers, the album was elevated by Jay-Z's uniquely deft and diverse rapping style. Writing for The A.V. Club, Nathan Rabin felt Jay-Z returned to "brevity and consistency" on an album that demonstrated his lyrical abilities and, more importantly, hip hop's best producers. Jon Caramanica wrote in The Rolling Stone Album Guide (2004) that The Black Album was both "old-school and utterly modern", showcasing Jay-Z "at the top of his game, able to reinvent himself as a rap classicist at the right time, as if to cement his place in hip-hop's legacy for generations to come".

Some reviewers were less enthusiastic. In Rolling Stone, Touré determined that The Black Album was slightly inferior to Jay-Z's best records, namely Reasonable Doubt (1996) and The Blueprint (2001). Dave Simpson from The Guardian was more critical, dismissing the music as "an aural equivalent of that old American favourite, the schmaltzy biopic." In The Village Voice, Robert Christgau gave the record a back-handed compliment: "[Jay-Z] raps like a legend in his own time—namely, Elvis in Vegas". Nonetheless, in a retrospective review in 2011, Christgau stated that he was impressed by the stretch of songs from "Encore" to "Justify My Thug" and thought "the fanfares, ovations, maternal reminiscences, and vamp-till-ready shout-outs were overblown at best" at the time of its release, but they came to sound "prophetic" because of the entrepreneurial success and fame he continued to achieve afterwards. "He's got a right to celebrate his autobiography in rhyme because he's on track to become a personage who dwarfs any mere rapper," Christgau wrote, "and not only can he hire the best help dark green can buy, he can make it sing."

In 2005, The Black Album was nominated for a Grammy Award for Best Rap Album, losing to Kanye West's The College Dropout at the 47th Grammy Awards. It was ranked number 349 on Rolling Stone's 2012 edition of The 500 Greatest Albums of All Time list, and rose to number 155 on the list's 2020 edition. Pitchfork ranked The Black Album at number 90 on its decade-end list of the top 200 albums from the 2000s, while Slant Magazine ranked it seventh best on a similar list. In 2012, Complex named it one of the "classic" records of the previous decade.

== Commercial performance ==
The Black Album debuted at number one on the US Billboard 200 chart, selling 463,000 copies in its first week, according to Nielsen Soundscan. This became Jay-Z's sixth US number one album. Another note on the alter was that the Black Album also blocked the soundtrack to the Tupac Shakur documentary, Tupac: Resurrection, and the G-Unit debut album, Beg for Mercy, from the top position. Both albums charted at numbers two and three respectively. In its second week, the album dropped to number four on the chart, selling an additional 288,000 copies. In its third week, the album climbed to number one on the chart, selling 288,000 more copies. In its fourth week, the album dropped to number ten on the chart, selling 124,000 copies. On August 16, 2005, the album was certified RIAA Certification triple platinum by the Recording Industry Association of America (RIAA) for shipments of over three million copies. As of July 2013, the album had sold 3,516,000 copies in the US. According to Billboard, it became Jay-Z's top selling record of the 2000s and the 136th highest selling record of the decade in the United States.

Three singles were released from the album and appeared on the Billboard charts. "Change Clothes" and "Dirt off Your Shoulder" both reached the top 10 of the Hot 100, while "99 Problems" peaked at number 30.

== Remixes ==
In December 2004, Roc-A-Fella Records released The Black Album on vinyl with no beats underneath Jay-Z's lyrics, spurring producers and DJs to rework his farewell disc into creations such as Kev Brown's The Brown Album and Danger Mouse's The Grey Album, the latter of which combines Jay's words with music from the Beatles' self-titled "White Album," breaking with Roc-A-Fella's tradition of not releasing acappella 12-inches, so producers could "remix the hell out of it."

Several notable reworkings were released but of all the remixed albums, The Grey Album was the most popular. The hype around The Grey Album gained notoriety when EMI attempted to halt its distribution despite approval from Jay-Z and the two surviving Beatles, Paul McCartney and Ringo Starr. EMI ordered Danger Mouse and retailers carrying the album to cease distribution. Music industry activist group Downhill Battle responded by coordinating Grey Tuesday, an electronic civil disobedience event held on February 24, 2004. Participating websites posted copies of The Grey Album for free download for a 24-hour period in protest of EMI's attempts to prevent distribution of the mashup on the grounds that sampling is fair use and that a statutory license should be provided in the same manner as if an artist were to perform or record a cover version of a song. Hundreds of websites publicized the event with 170 hosting the album for download. Over 100,000 copies were downloaded on that day alone. The legal repercussions of the protest were minimal; a number of the participants received cease and desist letters from EMI, but no charges were filed in connection with the event.

== Track listing ==
All song samples, writing and production credits are according to the album booklet.

The Black Album track listing
No.	Title	Writer(s)	Producer(s)	Length
1.	"Interlude"		Just Blaze	1:21
2.	"December 4th"	Shawn Carter; Justin Smith; Walter Boyd; Elijah Powell	Just Blaze	4:33
3.	"What More Can I Say"	Carter; Andre Gonzalez; Simon Johnson; Thom Bell; Kenneth Gamble; Roland Chambers	The Buchanans	4:55
4.	"Encore"	Carter; Kanye West; Paul McCartney; John Lennon	Kanye West	4:10
5.	"Change Clothes"	Carter; Pharrell Williams; Chad Hugo	The Neptunes	4:18
6.	"Dirt off Your Shoulder"	Carter; Timothy Mosley	Timbaland	4:05
7.	"Threat"	Carter; Patrick Douthit; Robert Kelly	9th Wonder; Jay-Z	4:06
8.	"Moment of Clarity"	Carter; Marshall Mathers; Luis Resto; Steve King	Eminem; Resto^{[a]}	4:24
9.	"99 Problems"	Carter; Rick Rubin; Norman Landsberg; Felix Pappalardi; John Ventura; Leslie Weinstein; William Squier; Tracy Marrow; Alphonso Henderson	Rubin	3:54
10.	"Public Service Announcement (Interlude)"	Carter; Smith; Raymond Levin	Just Blaze	2:53
11.	"Justify My Thug"	Carter; David Blake; Darryl McDaniels; Joseph Simmons; Larry Smith; Ingrid Chavez; Lenny Kravitz; Madonna Ciccone	DJ Quik	4:04
12.	"Lucifer"	Carter; Kanye West; Hugh Perry; Armend Cobi; Maxie Smith	Kanye West	3:12
13.	"Allure"	Carter; Pharrell Williams; Chad Hugo	The Neptunes	4:52
14.	"My 1st Song"	Carter; Nicholas McCarrell; Germain de La Fuente	Aqua; Joe "3H" Weinberger	4:45
Total length:				55:32

=== Notes ===
- ^{^[a]} signifies an additional producer
- "What More Can I Say" features additional vocals by Vincent 'Hum V' Bostic
- "Encore" features additional vocals by John Legend, Don Crawley, Leonard Harris and Kanye West
- "Change Clothes" features additional vocals by Pharrell Williams
- "Threat" features additional vocals by Cedric the Entertainer
- "Justify My Thug" features additional vocals by Sharlotte Gibson
- "Lucifer" features additional vocals by Kanye West

=== Sample credits ===
- "December 4th" contains a sample of "That's How Long" written by Walter Boyd and Elijah Powell Jr., and performed by The Chi-Lites.
- "What More Can I Say" contains samples of "Something for Nothing" written by Thom Bell, Kenneth Gamble and Roland Chambers, and performed by MFSB, and "Keep Your Hands High" written by Tracey Lee and Christopher Wallace, and performed by Tracey Lee featuring The Notorious B.I.G.
- "Encore" contains elements of "I Will" performed by John Holt, written by John Lennon and Paul McCartney (Note: John Lennon is credited to the Lennon-McCartney partnership although McCartney wrote this particular song solo.)
- "Threat" contains a sample from "A Woman's Threat" written and performed by R. Kelly.
- "99 Problems" contains samples of "Long Red" written by Norman Landsberg, Felix Pappalardi, John Ventura and Leslie Weinstein, and performed by Mountain, "Get Me Back on Time, Engine Number 9" performed by Wilson Pickett, "The Big Beat" written and performed by Billy Squier, elements of "99 Problems" written by Tracy Marrow and Alphonso Henderson, and performed by Ice-T, interpolations of "Touched" written by Chad Butler and Bernard Freeman, and performed by UGK, and portions of "Children's Story" written and performed by Slick Rick.
- "Public Service Announcement (Interlude)" contains a portion of "No One Can Do It Better" written by Tracy Curry and Andre Young, and performed by The D.O.C., and a sample of "Seed of Love" written by Raymond Levin, and performed by Little Boy Blues.
- "Justify My Thug" contains portions of "Rock Around the Clock" written by Max C. Freedman and James E. Myers, and performed by Bill Haley & His Comets, samples of "Rock Box" written by Darryl McDaniels, Joseph Simmons and Larry Smith, and performed by Run-DMC, and an interpolation of "Justify My Love", written by Madonna Ciccone, Ingrid Chavez and Lenny Kravitz, and performed by Madonna.
- "Lucifer" contains a sample of "Chase the Devil" written by Hugh Perry and Maxie Smith, and performed by Max Romeo.
- "My 1st Song" contains a sample of "Tu y Tu Mirar...Yo y Mi Canción" written by Germain de La Fuente, and performed by Los Angeles Negros, and a vocal portion of The Notorious B.I.G.'s 1996 interview for MTV.

== Personnel ==
Adapted from AllMusic.

- Aqua – producer
- Marcella Araica – assistant
- Vincent "Hum V" Bostic – vocals
- David Brown – engineer, mixing assistant
- Shari Bryant – marketing
- Buchannans – producer
- Kareem "Biggs" Burke – executive producer
- Shawn Carter – executive producer, liner notes, primary artist, producer
- Demacio Castellon – engineer
- Cedric The Entertainer – guest artist, vocals
- Don Crawley – vocals
- Damon Dash – executive producer
- Tony Dawsey – mastering
- DJ Quik – mixing, producer
- Danee Doty – vocals
- Jimmy Douglas – mixing
- Eminem – mixing, producer
- Sharlotte Gibson – vocals
- Walik Goshorn – photography
- Leon Harris – vocals
- Keenan "Kee Note" Holloway – bass
- Ken "Duro" Ifill – mixing
- Kyambo "Hip Hop" Joshua – A&R
- Just Blaze – producer
- Gimel Keaton – engineer, mixing
- Steve King – bass, engineer, guitar, mixing
- Jason Lader – programming
- Darcell Lawrence – A&R
- John Legend – vocals
- Jonathan Mannion – photography
- Rob Mitchell – A&R
- The Neptunes – producer
- 9th Wonder – producer
- Amber Noble – marketing
- Felix Pappalardi –
- Luis Resto – keyboards, producer
- Rick Rubin – mixing, producer
- Lenny Santiago – A&R, photography
- Andrew Scheps – engineer, mixing
- Robert Sims – art direction, design
- Chris Steflene – assistant engineer
- Michael Strange Jr. – engineer
- Darrell Thorp – mixing
- Timbaland – producer
- Richard Travali – mixing
- Joseph Weinberger – producer
- Eric Weissman – sample clearance
- Kanye West – producer, vocals

== Charts ==
=== Weekly charts ===
Weekly chart performance for The Black Album
Chart (2003–2004)	Peak position
Belgian Albums (Ultratop Flanders)	97
Canadian Albums (Nielsen SoundScan)	12
Canadian R&B Albums (Nielsen SoundScan)	2
Dutch Albums (Album Top 100)	66
French Albums (SNEP)	66
German Albums (Offizielle Top 100)	47
Irish Albums (IRMA)	54
Norwegian Albums (VG-lista)	18
Scottish Albums (Official Charts)	31
Swedish Albums (Sverigetopplistan)	41
Swiss Albums (Schweizer Hitparade)	29
UK Albums (Official Charts)	34
UK R&B Albums (Official Charts)	2
US Billboard 200	1
US Top R&B/Hip-Hop Albums (Billboard)	1
US Top Rap Albums (Billboard)	1

=== Year-end charts ===
2003 year-end chart performance for The Black Album
Chart (2003)	Position
US Billboard 200	145
US Top R&B/Hip-Hop Albums (Billboard)	52
Worldwide Albums (IFPI)	42

2004 year-end chart performance for The Black Album
Chart (2004)	Position
US Billboard 200	11
US Top R&B/Hip-Hop Albums (Billboard)	3

== Certifications ==
Certifications for The Black Album
Region	Certification	Certified units/sales
Canada (Music Canada)	Platinum	100,000^{^}
United Kingdom (BPI)	Platinum	300,000^{*}
United States (RIAA)	4× Platinum	4,000,000^{‡}
^{*} Sales figures based on certification alone.^{^} Shipments figures based on certification alone.^{‡} Sales+streaming figures based on certification alone.

== See also ==
- Danger Mouse – The Grey Album (2004)
- List of number-one albums of 2003 (U.S.)
- List of number-one R&B albums of 2003 (U.S.)
