= Encore (Jay-Z song) =

Song by Jay-Z

from the album The Black Album
- Released: November 14, 2003
- Recorded: 2003
- Genre: Hip hop; R&B
- Length: 4:11
- Label: Roc-A-Fella; Def Jam
- Songwriters: Shawn Carter; Kanye West; John Lennon; Paul McCartney (Note: Paul McCartney wrote the song himself, although credit is given to also John Lennon per the Lennon–McCartney partnership.)
- Producer: Kanye West

Music video
- "Encore" on YouTube

"Encore" is a hip-hop song from Jay-Z's The Black Album. It features guest vocals by John Legend, Don Crawley, GLC and Kanye West. The song was released by Roc-A-Fella Records and produced by West for Konman Productions.

"Encore" received much popularity in 2004 when it was mixed with Linkin Park's hit single "Numb" on the mash-up album Collision Course as "Numb/Encore", which went on to win a Grammy Award.

== Background ==
The Black Album was touted by Jay Z as his last album before he retired from rap music. He cited a perceived lack of competition as reason for his retirement, stating "The game ain't hot. I love when someone makes a hot album and then you've got to make a hot album. I love that. But it ain't hot." Many critics doubted the longevity of Jay Z's retirement, and Ryan Schrieber of Pitchfork speculated that the retirement declarations could constitute "an elaborate publicity stunt." Lyrically, "Encore" deals with these themes and addresses rumors of a post-retirement career. Critic Rob Mitchum wrote of the song that "it's a little hard to take Jay's claims of retirement at face value when... ("Encore") makes reference to 'when I come back like Jordan wearing the 45.'"

The song was first released as the fourth track on Jay Z's The Black Album. It gained popularity when it was mixed with Linkin Park's song "Numb." The subsequent track won Best Rap/Sung Collaboration at the Grammy Awards of 2006.

"Encore" was also released as the B-side on a 12" vinyl with "Dirt off Your Shoulder." The 12" includes the LP version, radio edit, and instrumental version of both songs.

== Song information ==
"Encore" features vocals by John Legend, Don Crawley, GLC and Kanye West. The song was released by Roc-A-Fella Records and produced by West for Konman Productions.

The production samples the trumpet introduction to John Holt's cover of "I Will" by The Beatles, therefore there is a Lennon–McCartney songwriting credit on the song.

== Reception ==
Al Shipley of Complex wrote that "Encore" "is perhaps the ultimate Black Album cut," while critic Dimas Sanfiorenzo called the track "probably one of the happiest songs of Hov's career."

== Credits and personnel ==
- Produced by Kanye West.
- Recorded by Gimel "Young Guru" Keaton at Baseline Studios in New York City, and at Record Plant Studios in Daytona Beach Florida.
- Mixed by Corey Cuomo and Jimmy Douglass.
- Additional vocals by Kanye West, Don Crawley, John Legend and GLC.
- Written by Jay-Z.

== Charts ==
| Chart (2003-2004) | Peak position |
|---|---|
| US Bubbling Under Hot 100 (Billboard) | 6 |
| US Hot R&B/Hip-Hop Songs (Billboard) | 30 |
| US Hot Rap Songs (Billboard) | 22 |

== Certifications ==
| Region | Certification | Certified units/sales |
|---|---|---|
| United States (RIAA) | Gold | 500,000^{‡} |
^{‡} Sales+streaming figures based on certification alone.

== See also ==
- List of songs recorded by Jay-Z
