= 99 Problems =

Single by Jay-Z

from the album The Black Album
- Released: April 27, 2004
- Recorded: July 2003
- Studio: The Mansion (Laurel Canyon, Los Angeles); Akademie Mathematique of Philosophical Sound Research (Los Angeles)
- Genre: Rap rock
- Length: 3:54
- Label: Roc-A-Fella; Def Jam
- Songwriters: Shawn Carter; Fredrick Rubin; Norman Landsberg; Felix Pappalardi; William Squier; John Ventura; Leslie Weinstein; Tracy Marrow; Alphonso Henderson; Bernard Freeman
- Producer: Rick Rubin

Jay-Z singles chronology
"Dirt off Your Shoulder" (2004)	"99 Problems" (2004)	"Storm" (2004)

Music video
- "99 Problems" on YouTube

"99 Problems" is the third single released by American rapper Jay-Z from The Black Album. It was released on April 27, 2004. The chorus of "I got 99 problems, but a bitch ain't one" is taken from the Ice-T song "99 Problems", from the album Home Invasion (1993).

In the song, Jay-Z tells a story about dealing with rap critics, racial profiling from a police officer who wants to search his car, and an aggressor. The song reached number 30 on the Billboard Hot 100.

== Production ==
The track was produced by Rick Rubin, his first hip hop production in many years. Rubin provided Jay-Z with a guitar riff and stripped-down beat that were once Rubin's trademarks. In creating the track, Rubin used some classic 1980s sample staples such as "The Big Beat" by Billy Squier, "Long Red" by Mountain, and "Get Me Back On Time" by Wilson Pickett. Featuring the same Billy Squier drum beat sample, Dizzee Rascal released "Fix Up, Look Sharp" in August 2003 prior to The Black Album's release.

== Origin of lyrics ==
The title and hook are derived from Ice-T's song of the same name, from his 1993 album Home Invasion, which featured Brother Marquis of the Miami-based 2 Live Crew. The original song was more profane and describes a wide range of sexual conquests. The hook was coined during a conversation between Ice-T and Brother Marquis. Marquis also used the phrase in the 1996 2 Live Crew song "Table Dance". Ice-T would re-record his version of the song with the Rubin/Jay-Z guitar riff for Body Count's 2014 album Manslaughter in order to "reclaim" the hook from being mis-attributed to Jay-Z. Portions of Ice-T's original lyrics were similarly quoted in a song by fellow rapper Trick Daddy on a track also titled "99 Problems" from his 2001 album Thugs Are Us. Jay-Z begins his third verse directly quoting lines from Bun B's opening verse off the track "Touched" from the UGK album Ridin' Dirty.

== Analysis ==
"99 Problems"
A sample of Jay-Z's "99 Problems"

The second verse, describing Jay-Z's traffic stop, has received much more attention than the rest of the song.

The second verse was based on an actual experience of Jay-Z in the 1990s in New Jersey. He wrote that in 1994, when he was pulled over by police while carrying cocaine in a secret compartment in his sunroof. He refused to let the police search the car and the police called for drug-sniffing dogs. However, the dogs never showed up and the police had to let him go. Moments after he drove away, he saw a police car with the dogs drive by. In a discussion at the Celeste Bartos Forum at the New York Public Library, Jay-Z described the second verse of the song as representing "a contest of wills" between the car's driver who is "all the way in the wrong" for carrying illegal drugs, and a racist police officer who pulls over the driver not for any infraction but for being African American. "Both guys are used to getting their way" and thus reluctant to back down, Jay-Z notes, and the driver "knows a bit about the law because he's used to breaking it" and asserts his legal rights.

In 2011, Southwestern Law School Professor Caleb Mason wrote an article with a line-by-line analysis of the second verse of the song from a legal perspective referencing the Fourth Amendment to the United States Constitution, citing it as a useful tool for teaching law students search and seizure law involving search warrants, Terry stops, racial profiling, the exclusionary rule, and the motor vehicle exception. Mason writes that some of Jay-Z's lyrics are legally accurate and describe prudent behavior (e.g., identifying when police ask for consent to search, specifically asking if one is under arrest, and complying with the police order to stop rather than fleeing which would certainly result in a search of the car and might authorize police to use lethal force to stop a high speed chase). However, Mason also notes the song lyrics are legally incorrect in indicating that a driver can refuse an order to exit the car and that police would need a warrant to search a locked glove compartment or trunk—in fact, police would only need probable cause to search a car. In 2012, Professor Emir Crowne of the University of Windsor Faculty of Law wrote an article concluding that Jay-Z's lyrics may be legally correct under Canadian law.

Jay-Z, in his book Decoded, clarified that the "bitch" in the chorus refers to a different subject in each verse; in the second, it refers to a police dog, but in the third, it refers to a cowardly individual.

== Reception ==
The song garnered widespread acclaim. The song came in at No. 2 on Rolling Stone's top 100 songs of the '00s. On the updated list of the 500 Greatest Songs of All Time, the song was added and came in at No. 172. In 2019, they ranked the song number four on their list of the 50 greatest Jay-Z songs. The song was listed at No. 14 on Pitchfork Media's top 500 songs of the 2000s (decade) and in October 2011, NME placed it at number 24 on its list "150 Best Tracks of the Past 15 Years".

Jack White has hailed the song, describing it as "the story of America ... in a nutshell, [it's] the story of all the struggles in America, black or white, [and of] class systems".

The song won Best Rap Solo Performance at the 47th Grammy Awards.

== Covers and performances ==
In 2008, the single was covered by Barry Chuckle of British children's comedy duo The Chuckle Brothers as part of BBC Radio 1's Scott Mills show. Mills described the cover as "superior, in essence, to the original".

On January 21, 2009, Jay-Z performed the single as part of his set at the Staff Ball, the last official event of Barack Obama's inauguration. The ball was exclusively for 4,000 staffers who had worked on Obama's campaign. Jay-Z tweaked the lyrics to suit the historic atmosphere, and the crowd sang along: "I got 99 problems but a Bush ain't one", replacing "bitch" with the name of the former President. At a rally for President Barack Obama in November 2012 Jay-Z changed the lyrics of the song to "If you having world problems I feel bad for you son / I got 99 problems but Mitt ain't one." President Obama quipped in his monologue at the White House Correspondents' Dinner on April 27, 2013: "Some things are beyond my control. For example, this whole controversy about Jay-Z going to Cuba. It's unbelievable. I've got 99 problems and now Jay-Z is one."

Eminem referenced the lyrics in his track "So Much Better" on The Marshall Mathers LP 2 album, with the lines "I got 99 problems and a bitch ain't one/ She's all 99 of 'em; I need a machine gun".

Danger Mouse remixed this track with samples from "Helter Skelter" by The Beatles as part of his oft-bootlegged album The Grey Album. The track was also remixed with Linkin Park for the EP Collision Course, being mixed with the Linkin Park songs "Points of Authority" and "One Step Closer". The thrash metal group Body Count combined the lyrics of Ice-T's "99 Problems" with the guitar riff from Jay-Z's "99 Problems" for the track "99 Problems BC" on the album Manslaughter. Big Sean referenced the lyrics in Drake's "All Me" with the line "I got 99 problems, getting rich ain't one". Iggy Azalea referenced the lyrics in Ariana Grande's "Problem" with the line "I got 99 problems but you won't be one". In 2009, fellow rapper and collaborator Kid Cudi, referenced the hook in the opening verse of his song "Soundtrack 2 My Life" with the line "I got 99 problems and they all bitches". The singer Hugo recorded a bluegrass cover in 2011, with all different lyrics except for the hook, and featured in the end credits of Fright Night as well as "Girlfriends", the fourth episode of the TV series Reboot. There have been several remixes of the track including versions by The Prodigy and Linkin Park. In particular, Jay-Z had been quoted as saying that The Prodigy remix is one of his favorites by keeping the main guitar riff but heavier and darker which in turn was the inspiration for The Prodigy track "Spitfire" written by Liam Howlett and released in 2005.

== Music video ==
The music video premiered in April 2004 and was directed by Mark Romanek. It received praises from critics such as Armond White, and was nominated for four MVPA awards in 2005, of which it won three. It also won the MTV Video Music Awards for Best Rap Video, Best Director, Best Editing and Best Cinematography, as well as gaining nominations for Video of the Year and Best Male Video. It was criticized, however, by the Humane Society of the United States for scenes in the video that glorified dog fighting.

The video accompanied The Black Album which, at the time, was to be Jay-Z's final release. Jay-Z has stated that he wanted the video to be as auto-biographical as the rest of the album. The goal for the video was to create a portrait of where Jay-Z grew up. In a conversation with the video's director, Jay-Z stated that he wanted the video to "make a pissy wall look like art". The job of directing this video was originally intended for Quentin Tarantino, however Rick Rubin suggested that Jay-Z offer the job to Mark Romanek. Due to the research and influence of Romanek and the videos cinematographer, Joaquin Baca Asay, the video borrows visual characteristics from many New York street photographers and black and white photographs (Martin Dixon and Eugene Richards to name a few). The video is shot entirely on black-and-white film. It consists mainly of scenes filmed in close proximity to Jay-Z's childhood home, The Marcy Houses in Bedford Stuyvesant. These include:

- Jay-Z and Rubin in a Lexus GS300 being stopped by the police (lyrical reenactment).
- Jay-Z in the Marcy Houses housing project where he grew up.
- Break dancers and a group doing a rhythm choreography.
- Jay-Z performing in Transit Wheelers Motorcycle/Van Club House.
- Jay-Z on the Brooklyn Bridge.
- A woman putting on makeup.
- Inmates of a prison in the Bronx known as Vernon C. Bain Correctional Center.
- Rick Rubin walking with Vincent Gallo.
- A funeral director making preparations.
- A rabbi praying.
- A dogfight with many spectators, and the owners of the dogs taunting them in preparation for the fight.
- Members of Alpha Phi Alpha performing a complex stepping routine.
- Jay-Z's lawyer, facilitating bail then reacting to news of his death.
- African-American motorcycle clubs in front of Transit Wheelers MC Club House in Brooklyn, New York, performing street stunts.
- Jay-Z being shot with multiple bullets by unseen assailants with special effect devices called bullet hit squibs. This final scene was very controversial as music video networks normally remove any scenes with violent content. On MTV, every airing of the video featured an introduction by John Norris explaining why the network felt it was proper to air the video unedited. The introduction also featured Jay-Z explaining why he felt the scene was important to the video. Jay-Z also made a special introduction for BET. Jay-Z explained that the depiction of a shooting is analogous to the "death" of Jay-Z, and the "rebirth" of Shawn Carter.

== Track listings ==
=== 99 Problems/My 1st Song ===
A-Side

1. 99 Problems (Clean)
2. 99 Problems (Main)
3. 99 Problems (Instrumental)

B-Side

1. My 1st Song (Clean)
2. My 1st Song (Main)
3. My 1st Song (Instrumental)

=== 99 Problems/Dirt Off Your Shoulder, Pt. 1 ===
1. 99 Problems
2. Dirt Off Your Shoulder

=== 99 Problems/Dirt Off Your Shoulder, Pt. 2 ===
1. 99 Problems
2. Dirt Off Your Shoulder
3. 99 Problems (Video)
4. Dirt Off Your Shoulder (Video)

=== 99 Problems/Dirt Off Your Shoulder, Vinyl ===
A-Side

1. 99 Problems
2. 99 Problems (Clean)

B-Side

1. Dirt Off Your Shoulder
2. Dirt Off Your Shoulder (Clean)

== Charts ==
=== Weekly charts ===
Chart (2004)	Peak position
Germany (GfK)	67
Ireland (IRMA)	23
UK Singles (OCC)	12
UK Hip Hop/R&B (OCC)	2
US Billboard Hot 100	30
US Hot R&B/Hip-Hop Songs (Billboard)	26
US Pop Airplay (Billboard)	37
US Hot Rap Songs (Billboard)	10

=== Year-end charts ===
Chart (2004)	Position
UK Singles (OCC)	164

== Certifications ==
Region	Certification	Certified units/sales
Denmark (IFPI Danmark)	Gold	45,000^{‡}
Germany (BVMI)	Gold	150,000^{‡}
New Zealand (RMNZ)	Gold	7,500^{*}
United Kingdom (BPI)	Platinum	600,000^{‡}
United States (RIAA)	3× Platinum	3,000,000^{‡}
^{*} Sales figures based on certification alone.^{‡} Sales+streaming figures based on certification alone.

== Release history ==
Region	Date	Format(s)	Label(s)	Ref.
United States	May 24, 2004	Rhythmic contemporary · urban contemporary radio	Roc-A-Fella, IDJMG	
United States	June 8, 2004	Contemporary hit radio	Roc-A-Fella, IDJMG	
