= Rich Boy (album) =

Studio album by Rich Boy
- Released: March 13, 2007
- Recorded: 2006–2007
- Studios: Jada Entertainment (Mobile); ZAC Recordings (Atlanta); The Hit Factory (Miami); DARP Recordings (Atlanta); PatchWerk (Atlanta); Silent Sound (Atlanta); The Zone (Atlanta); Tree Sound (Norcross); S-Line (Atlanta); Stankonia (Atlanta); Capstone (Douglasville); Manhattan Center (New York City); The Cutting Room (New York City); Larrabee North (North Hollywood); Doppler (Atlanta)
- Genres: Southern hip-hop; gangsta rap
- Length: 68:01
- Labels: Zone 4; Interscope
- Producers: Polow da Don; Lil Jon; Rich Boy; Brian Kidd; DJ David C.; Donnie Scantz; Needlz; Aqua; Mr. DJ; Willy Will

Rich Boy chronology
Rich Boy (2007)	Break the Pot (2014)

Singles from Rich Boy
- 1. "Throw Some D's" Released: August 15, 2006; 2. "Boy Looka Here" Released: February 14, 2007

Rich Boy is the debut studio album by American rapper Rich Boy, released on March 13, 2007 through Interscope and Zone 4. The album was supported by Rich Boy's smash hit debut single, "Throw Some D's" produced by and featuring Polow da Don, which peaked at number six on the Billboard Hot 100. The remix of "Throw Some D's" appears on this album and features Nelly, Jim Jones, André 3000, The Game, Murphy Lee and Lil Jon.

The album received lukewarm responses from critics, with reviews mixed on the production and lyrics. Rich Boy peaked at number three on the Billboard 200 chart, with 112,000 copies sold in its first week. By the week of June 17, 2007, 332,000 copies had been sold.

== Critical reception ==
Professional ratings
Review scores
Source	Rating
About	2.5/5 stars
AbsolutePunk	(49%)
AllMusic	2.5/5 stars
Entertainment Weekly	B+
HipHopDX	3/5 stars
Pitchfork	7.5/10
PopMatters	5/10 stars
RapReviews	5/10
Rolling Stone	3.5/5 stars
XXL	(L)

Simon Vozick-Levinson of Entertainment Weekly gave praise to Rich's vocal delivery and Polow's "intricate, varied, and unfailingly catchy instrumentals" for masking the "occasional lapses into generic macho posturing" throughout the lyrics. Jonathan Ringen of Rolling Stone noted how the record follows the Young Jeezy template ("a hypnotic flow, vivid details, synth-soaked beats") but with a more varied list of topics. He also gave credit to Polow's production, singling out "Boy Looka Here" for being a "menacing banger". Pitchfork contributor Tom Breihan said, "[T]he album's stunning, high-impact production fits it into the recent tradition of epic, monolithic Southern-rap albums like Young Buck's Straight Outta Ca$hville and Young Jeezy's Let's Get It: Thug Motivation 101, but more than those albums, it's the work of one idiosyncratic creative mind. Polow [da Don] is just now finding his voice, and he's got a great career ahead of him. If Rich Boy is lucky, he'll stay along for the ride."

XXL's Paul Cantor credited Rich on "Boy Looka Here" and "Ghetto Rich" for showcasing both his swagger and introspection but felt he falters on "What It Do" and "Lost Girls" when the production either reveals his lyrical flaws or dilutes his given message, concluding that "Sprinkled with a few more moments of clarity, Rich Boy has enough hits to make it worthy of throwin' some cheese on it." J-23 of HipHopDX praised Polow for creating bangers like "Boy Looka Here" and "Touch That Ass" that match Rich's style to perfection but was critical of the latter's rapping talents being exposed by filler tracks, guest artists and producers, concluding that "Rich Boy ends up being a pretty good album, but it probably should have been titled Polow Da Don as he really deserves the bulk of the credit. The album may be good, but a cookie cutter rapper like Rich Boy is going to have less shelf live than his album will."

AllMusic's Andy Kellman commended Rich's unique vocalization and the production, highlighting Brian Kidd's contribution on "Get to Poppin'", but concluded that the album wears thin with stagnant beats and "uninspired variations on the rampant materialism done so effectively on "Throw Some D's."" Steve 'Flash' Juon of RapReviews criticized Rich's "monotonous thuggery delivered with an excessively thick accent" and Polow's production having a "night and day" unevenness throughout the record. PopMatters contributor Gentry Boeckel felt that Polow and Brian Kidd overshadow Rich throughout the album with their contributions instead of helping him craft a unique image, concluding that, "Both as an artist and a persona, Rich Boy lives up to his name, with the best thing one can say about him is that he has a certain get-rich-quick innocence, a certain naive hunger to succeed. Too bad that success depends so much on his collaborators." Reptilia of AbsolutePunk was also critical of Rich's lyricism ruining Polow's catchy beats, concluding that, "Too much of Rich Boy's style is playing up the same "gangsta" stereotypes and not really doing anything to distance his flow and his lack of profound or at least interesting rhyme from anybody else's in the modern rap scene. And unfortunately, the Polow Show doesn't cover those flaws."

== Track listing ==
No.	Title	Writer(s)	Producer(s)	Length
1.	"The Madness"	Marece Richards	Rich Boy	3:04
2.	"Role Models" (featuring David Banner and Attitude)	Richards; Timothy Clayton; Lavell Crump; Jamal Jones; Donnie Scantz	Polow da Don; Donnie Scantz^{[a]}	3:49
3.	"Boy Looka Here"	Richards; Jones	Polow da Don	3:51
4.	"Throw Some D's" (featuring Polow da Don)	Richards; Jones; Robert Crawford; Robert DeBarge; Gregory Williams	Butta; Polow da Don^{[a]}	4:23
5.	"What It Do" (featuring Cutty)	Richards; Jonathan Smith; Abeeku Ribeiro; LaMarquis Jefferson	Lil Jon	3:42
6.	"Good Things" (featuring Polow da Don and Keri)	Richards; Jones; Clayton; Jason Perry; Keri Hilson	Polow da Don; Willy Will; Jason Perry^{[a]}	4:22
7.	"Hustla Balla Gangsta Mack"	Richards; Brian Kidd	Brian Kidd	4:06
8.	"Touch That Ass"	Richards; Jones	Polow da Don	3:45
9.	"On the Regular"	Richards; Jones; Mel Johnson	Polow da Don	3:39
10.	"Gangsta (Interlude)" (featuring Mark Twain)	Richards; Khari Cain; H. Willis	Needlz	2:42
11.	"Get to Poppin'"	Richards; Kidd; Ribeiro; Kirk Robinson	Brian Kidd	3:18
12.	"And I Love You" (featuring Big Boi and Pastor Troy)	Richards; David Sheats; Jeffrey Bowden; Antwan Patton; Micah Troy; Zach Murray	Mr. DJ	4:31
13.	"Lost Girls" (featuring Keri and Rock City)	Richards; Nicholas McCarrell; Grover Washington Jr.	Aqua; Polow da Don^{[a]}	3:57
14.	"Ghetto Rich" (featuring John Legend)	Richards; Jones; Mykell McIntosh	Polow da Don	4:02
15.	"Let's Get This Paper"	Richards; Jones	Polow da Don	8:58
16.	"Throw Some D's (Remix)" (featuring André 3000, Jim Jones, Murphy Lee, Nelly and The Game)	Richards; Jones; Crawford; DeBarge; Williams; Smith; André Benjamin; Cornell Haynes; Jayceon Taylor	Lil Jon	5:51

Notes

- ^{^[a]} signifies a co-producer.
- "Good Things" features additional vocals by Mykel and Attitude.
- "Hustla Balla Gangsta Mack" features additional vocals by Divinity.
- "On the Regular" features additional vocals by Mel Johnson and L2.
- "Gangsta (Interlude)" features additional vocals by Traci Nelson and Barbara Wilson.
- "Get to Poppin'" features additional vocals by Doris Eugenio and Abeku.
- "And I Love You" features additional vocals by Big Zac.

Sample and interpolation credits

- "Throw Some D's" contains a sample of "I Call Your Name", written by Bobby DeBarge and Gregory Williams, and performed by Switch.
- "Get to Poppin'" contains an interpolation of "Top Billin'", written and performed by Audio Two.
- "Lost Girls" contains a sample of "Loran's Dance", written by Grover Washington Jr., and performed by Mudie's All Stars.

== Personnel ==
Credits adapted from the album's liner notes.

- Chris Galletta – guitar (3)
- Mike Hartnett – guitar (9), bass (14)
- Tony Dalco – guitar (12)
- LaMarquis Jefferson – bass (5)
- Preston Crump – bass (12)
- Lil Jon – drums, keys (5)
- Bashiri Johnson – congos (11)
- Jason Perry – keyboards (6, 9, 15)
- Elvis Williams – keyboards (9, 14)
- Marvin Parkman – keyboards (12)
- Tom Brenneck – horns (3)
- The Camp David Cadets – horns (12)
- DJ Farenheit – scratches (2)
- Billy Hume – mixing (2, 4, 15)
- Phil Tan – mixing (3, 9, 14)
- Jon Frye – mixing (5, 12, 16)
- Jimmy Douglass – mixing (7, 11)
- Marcella Araica – mixing (1)
- Tony Terrabonne – mixing (6)
- Jason Schweitzer – mixing (8)
- Pat Viala – mixing (10)
- Dave Pensado – mixing (13)
- Brian Gardner – mastering (Bernie Grundman)
- Deborah Mannis-Gardner – sample clearance agent (DMG Clearance, Inc)
- Slang Inc. – art direction/design
- Chapman Baehler – photography

== Charts ==
=== Weekly charts ===
Chart (2007)	Peak position
US Billboard 200	3
US Top R&B/Hip-Hop Albums (Billboard)	3
US Top Rap Albums (Billboard)	1

=== Year-end charts ===
Chart (2007)	Position
US Billboard 200	161
US Top R&B/Hip-Hop Albums (Billboard)	45
