= Public Service Announcement (song) =

Song by Jay-Z

"Public Service Announcement (Interlude)"

Song by Jay-Z

from the album The Black Album
- Released: November 14, 2003
- Recorded: 2003
- Studio: Baseline (New York)
- Genre: Hip hop
- Length: 2:53
- Label: Roc-A-Fella; Def Jam
- Songwriters: Shawn Carter; Justin Smith; Raymond Levin
- Producer: Just Blaze

"Public Service Announcement (Interlude)" (also "My Name is H.O.V") is a song by American rapper Jay-Z from his eighth studio album The Black Album (2003). Produced by Just Blaze, it serves as an interlude on the album.

== Background ==
Just Blaze's production of the song was inspired by a record that his friend Big Jack had played for him. Sampling a loop from "Seed of Love" by The Little Boy Blues, he created the beat in about ten minutes. That same day, Jay-Z took part in listening sessions for the press in promotion of The Black Album. One session was with The Village Voice reporter Elizabeth Mendez Berry. In his 2010 autobiography and memoir Decoded, Jay-Z described the interaction with Berry:

After we listened to the album the reporter came up to me and said the strangest thing: "You don't feel funny?" I was like, Huh?, because I knew she meant funny as in weird, and I was thinking, Actually, I feel real comfortable; this is one of the best albums of my career. ... But then she said it again: "You don't feel funny? You're wearing that Che T-shirt and you have–" she gestured dramatically at the chain around my neck. "I couldn't even concentrate on the music," she said. "All I could think of is that big chain bouncing off of Che's forehead." The chain was a Jesus piece–the Jesus piece that Biggie used to wear, in fact. It's part of my ritual when I record an album: I wear the Jesus piece and let my hair grow till I'm done.

Before leaving, Berry gave Jay-Z a copy of a critical essay she wrote on his albums Reasonable Doubt, Vol. 3... Life and Times of S. Carter, and The Blueprint. It inspired him to write the second verse of the song. The next day, Just Blaze played the beat he had produced to Jay-Z. The beat, which Jay described "opened with dark minor organ notes and then flooded them with brassy chords" and was "beautiful", became the foundation of the song. Jay-Z rapped two verses and no chorus over the track because of limited time and called the song "Public Service Announcement". In an interview with Revolt in 2013, Just Blaze stated that Jay-Z recorded four lines at a time, in between meetings with the press.

=== Content ===
The subject of the first verse centers on Jay-Z rapping about how good a rapper he is. Jay-Z has regarded the verse as a "test of creativity and wit". Furthermore, in Decoded he wrote, "I call rhymes like the first verse on 'Public Service Announcement' Easter-egg hunts, because if you just listen to it once without paying attention, you'll brush past some lines that can offer more meaning and resonance every time you listen to them." The second verse is almost unrelated to the first and contains a response to Berry's comments: "I'm like Che Guevara with bling on, I'm complex".

== Reception ==
In 2019, Rolling Stone ranked the song number seven on their list of the 50 greatest Jay-Z songs. Complex rated the song's opening line ("Allow me to reintroduce myself") at number 20 in its "100 Best Opening Lines in Rap History".

== Charts ==
Chart (2003)	Peak Position
US Bubbling Under R&B/Hip-Hop Singles (Billboard)	7

== Certifications ==
Region	Certification	Certified units/sales
United States (RIAA)	Gold	500,000^{‡}
^{‡} Sales+streaming figures based on certification alone.
