= My 1st Song =

Song by Jay-Z

from the album The Black Album
- Recorded: 2003
- Genre: Hip hop
- Length: 4:45
- Label: Roc-A-Fella; Def Jam
- Songwriters: Shawn Carter; Germain de la Fuente
- Producers: Aqua; Joe "3H" Weinberger

"My 1st Song" is a song by Jay-Z which appears on his eighth studio album The Black Album as the final track.

== Background ==
In a sample of an interview with Biggie Smalls at the beginning of the song, the late rapper is heard saying he tries to "treat everything like it's [his] first project." Hence, the name of the song, which Jay-Z is apparently calling his "first song," even though it is the last song on what was to be his last album, as an allusion to what B.I.G. said in the interview. The song describes Jay-Z growing up on the streets of New York. Despite being described as his first song, Jay-Z also described the song as his last; towards the end of the outro, Jay-Z says "I'm goin' somewhere nice where no mosquitos at nigga." "The song contains a sample of "Tu y Tu Mirar...Yo y Mi Canción" by Los Angeles Negros.

The song was part of the track list for Jay-Z's memoir, "Decoded."

The track was also revealed to be US President Barack Obama's favorite song by the artist during the 2012 United States Presidential Election, because it reminds him to "always stay hungry."

== See also ==
- List of songs recorded by Jay-Z
