= Rich Boy =

American rapper (born 1983)

- Born: Marece Benjamin Richards; September 2, 1983 (age 43); Mobile, Alabama, U.S.
- Genre: Southern hip-hop
- Occupations: Rapper; songwriter; record producer
- Years active: 2003–present
- Labels: E1; RBC; Vice; Zone 4; Interscope
- Producer(s): Polow da Don

Marece Benjamin Richards (born September 2, 1983), better known by his stage name Rich Boy, is an American rapper known for his 2006 single "Throw Some D's" (featuring Polow da Don), which peaked at number six on the Billboard Hot 100. It served as lead single for his eponymous debut studio album (2007), which was released in March of the following year by Polow da Don's Zone 4, an imprint Interscope Records.

A commercial success, the album peaked at number three on the Billboard 200, although critical reception was mixed. His 2009 follow-up single, "Drop" (featuring Polow da Don) became popular through remixes and freestyles by then-upcoming Internet rappers, including Childish Gambino, Kid Cudi, and Earl Sweatshirt. His subsequent releases have failed to yield any further commercial response.

== Early life and education ==
Richards is from Alabama. He was studying mechanical engineering at Tuskegee University, but he dropped out to concentrate on pursuing a rap career.

== Career ==
Rich Boy signed a contract with Zone 4 through Interscope Records and started to work on his debut album. In the meantime, he appeared on one of Ludacris' Disturbing tha Peace compilations and on a few mixtapes, such as Comeback Season by Canadian rapper Drake and Da Bottom, Vol. 5 by DJ Ideal and Jermaine Dupri.

On March 13, 2007, Rich Boy released his self-titled debut album, with the singles "Throw Some D's," "Boy Looka Here," "Good Things", and "Let's Get This Paper". "Throw Some D's" reached #6 on the Billboard Hot 100, #3 on the Hot R&B/Hip-Hop Songs, and #2 on the Hot Rap Tracks chart. "Boy Looka Here" and "Good Things" both peaked around #50 on the R&B chart. In 2009 he released a single, "Top of the World", which was part of the album Music Inspired by More Than a Game.

Rich Boy's second album was intended in 2010 to be titled Resurrected in Diamonds and was slated for a 2013 release. The intended first single released off the album was "Drop" which had been released in the beginning of early 2009. Another track "She Luvs Me (She Luvs Mi Knot)" featuring Polow da Don was released on June 21, 2010. Both Dr. Dre and Polow da Don were confirmed contributors or producers for the album.

On March 18, 2013, Rich Boy released the mixtape Back to Class in promotion of his second studio album, Break the Pot. On January 14, 2013, the title track was released as a single in promotion of the album, featuring Hemi. On February 25, 2013, it was announced that Break the Pot would be released on April 9, 2013, and would feature guest appearances from Maino, Mista Raja, Bobby V, Doe B, Playboi Lo and Smash. On March 17, the music video for "Break the Pot" premiered on MTV Jams. Break the Pot was released on April 9, 2013, and included the single "Pimp On", which featured Doe B, Playboi Lo and Smash.

== Discography ==
=== Studio albums ===
List of albums, with selected chart positions
Title	Album details	Peak chart positions		
Title	Album details	US	US R&B /HH	US Rap
Rich Boy	Released: March 13, 2007; Label: Zone 4, Interscope; Format: CD, LP, digital download	3	3	1
Break the Pot	Released: April 9, 2013; Label: E1, Vice; Format: CD, LP, digital download	—	39	27
Featuring	Released: August 7, 2015; Label: RBC Records, E1; Format: CD, LP, digital download	—	—	—

=== Mixtapes ===
Year	Mixtape
2006	Bring It to the Block: Released: 2006; Label: Zone 4/ Interscope/ Aphilliates; Hosted by DJ Drama
2008	Bigger Than the Mayor: Released: 2008; Label: Zone 4/ Interscope
2009	Pacc Man: Released: 2009; Label: Zone 4/ Interscope
2009	Kool-Aid, Kush & Convertibles: Released: 2009; Label: Zone 4/ Interscope; Hosted By DJ Scream
2011	12 Diamonds: Released: 2011; Label: Zone 4/ Interscope
2011	Gold Kilo$: Released: May 12, 2011; Label: Zone 4/ Interscope
2013	Back to Class: Released: March 18, 2013; Label: Zone 4/ Interscope

=== Singles ===
List of singles, with selected chart positions, showing year released and album name
Title	Year	Peak chart positions				Certifications	Album
Title	Year	US	US R&B /HH	US Rap	FIN	Certifications	Album
"Throw Some D's" (featuring Polow da Don)	2006	6	3	2	9	RIAA: Platinum	Rich Boy
"Boy Looka Here"	2007	116	53	—	—		Rich Boy
"Good Things" (featuring Polow da Don and Keri Hilson)	2007	—	54	—	—		Rich Boy
"Drop" (featuring Polow da Don)	2009	—	85	—	—		Non-album single
"Break the Pot" (featuring Hemi)	2013	—	—	—	—		Break the Pot
"—" denotes a recording that did not chart.

=== Guest appearances ===
List of non-single guest appearances, with other performing artists, showing year released and album name
Title	Year	Other artist(s)	Album
"Break A Nigga Off"	2005	Lil' Fate, Gangsta Boo	Disturbing tha Peace
"Get to Poppin' (Remix)"	2005	Pitbull	Money Is Still a Major Issue
"Sexy Lady (Remix)"	2007	Hitmaka, Jim Jones	Almost Famous: The Sexy Lady EP
"1st Piece"	2007	UTP, Juvenile	Back Like We Left Something
"Must Hate Money"	2007	Drake	Comeback Season
"Doin' Me!"	2007	Young Bleed	Once Upon a Time in Amedica
"Ghetto Queen"	2007	Trae tha Truth, Lloyd	Life Goes On
"Kryptonite"	2007	Mario	Go
"I Know Why"	2007	Gucci Mane, Pimp C, Blaze-1	Back to the Trap House
"Paper Planes (Diplo Remix)"	2009	M.I.A., Diplo, Bun B	Decent Work for Decent Pay

== Awards and nominations ==
=== BET Hip Hop Awards ===
- 2007: Rookie Of the Year [win]
