= Dirt off Your Shoulder =

Single by Jay-Z

from the album The Black Album
- Released: March 2, 2004
- Recorded: 2003
- Genre: East Coast hip-hop
- Length: 3:59
- Label: Roc-A-Fella; Def Jam
- Songwriters: Shawn Carter; Timothy Mosley
- Producer: Timbaland

Jay-Z singles chronology
"Change Clothes" (2003)	"Dirt off Your Shoulder" (2004)	"99 Problems" (2004)

Music video
- "Dirt off Your Shoulder" on YouTube

"Dirt off Your Shoulder" is the second single released from Jay-Z's 2003 album The Black Album.

In 2004, the song was combined with the Linkin Park single "Lying from You" and released as a single for the mash-up album Collision Course.

== Political influence ==
On April 17, 2008, Democratic presidential candidate Barack Obama referenced the song in gesture, in response to sharp attacks from his then-rival Hillary Clinton and a debate which was widely criticized for focusing on campaign gaffes rather than on candidates' policy positions. Referencing his opponents' "textbook Washington" tactics (focusing on personal attacks and trivial issues) Obama used Jay-Z's hand signal to "brush the dirt" off his shoulders. When asked whether Obama was deliberately referencing the song, a campaign spokesman said, "He has some Jay-Z on his iPod."

Clinton later made the same gesture during her appearance before the House Select Committee on Benghazi.

== Formats and track listings ==
=== A-Side ===
1. Dirt off Your Shoulder (Radio Edit)
2. Dirt off Your Shoulder (LP)
3. Dirt off Your Shoulder (Instrumental)

=== B-Side ===
1. Encore (Radio Edit)
2. Encore (LP)
3. Encore (Instrumental)

=== 99 Problems/Dirt off Your Shoulder, Pt. 1 ===
1. 99 Problems (Explicit)
2. Dirt off Your Shoulder (Explicit)

=== 99 Problems/Dirt off Your Shoulder, Pt. 2 ===
1. 99 Problems (Explicit)
2. Dirt off Your Shoulder (Explicit)
3. 99 Problems (Video)
4. Dirt off Your Shoulder (Video)

=== 99 Problems/Dirt off Your Shoulder, Vinyl ===
A-Side

1. 99 Problems (Explicit)
2. 99 Problems (Clean)

B-Side

1. Dirt off Your Shoulder (Explicit)
2. Dirt off Your Shoulder (Clean)

== Charts ==
In the U.S. the song peaked at number 5 on the Billboard Hot 100 making it Jay-Z's third highest peak on the chart at the time when including featured appearances (tied with "Swagga Like Us").

=== Weekly charts ===
Chart (2004)	Peak position
Scotland Singles (OCC) With 99 Problems	14
UK Singles (OCC) With 99 Problems	12
UK Hip Hop/R&B (OCC) With 99 Problems	2
US Billboard Hot 100	5
US Hot R&B/Hip-Hop Songs (Billboard)	3
US Hot Rap Songs (Billboard)	2
US Pop Airplay (Billboard)	18
US Rhythmic Airplay (Billboard)	5

=== Year-end charts ===
Chart (2004)	Position
US Billboard Hot 100	21
US Hot R&B/Hip-Hop Songs (Billboard)	14

== Certifications ==
Region	Certification	Certified units/sales
United States (RIAA)	2× Platinum	2,000,000^{‡}
^{‡} Sales+streaming figures based on certification alone.

== Release history ==
Region	Date	Format(s)	Label(s)	Ref.
United States	January 19, 2004	Rhythmic contemporary · urban contemporary radio	Roc-A-Fella, IDJMG	

== See also ==
- List of songs recorded by Jay-Z
