= Lil Jon production discography =

The following is a production discography of American rapper and producer Lil Jon.

== 1995–2000 ==
=== 1995 ===
- Capleton – "Wings of the Morning"
  - A1. "Wings of the Morning (Dynamic Duo Mix) (featuring Method Man)

=== 1997 ===
- Total – "What About Us?"
  - A2. "What About Us? (Lil Jon Remix)" (featuring Sean Paul)
- Uncle Luke – Changin' the Game
  - 06. "Like This, Like That" (featuring Jiggy)
  - 08. "Luke's Sheila"
  - 10. "Live at Freaknik" [co-produced by Danny 'D' Spohn]
- Usher – "You Make Me Wanna..."
  - "You Make Me Wanna (Lil Jon Remix)"

=== 1998 ===
- Mariah Carey – "Sweetheart"
  - A3. "Sweetheart (Lil Jon Remix)"
- Too Short – Nationwide: Independence Day
  - 2-2. "Couldn't Be a Better Player" [Lil Jon & His Boyz]

=== 1999 ===
- INOJ – Ready for the World
  - 14. "Ring My Bell"
- Various Artists – The Wood (soundtrack)
  - 10. "24-7 (Lil Jonny Remix)" [Liberty City]

=== 2000 ===
- Mak Villain – The Arrival
  - 15. "Time After Time (Remix) (featuring Lil Jon)
- Various Artists – Big Momma's House (soundtrack)
  - 09. "I Like Dem" [Lil Jon & His Boyz]
  - 12. "Ooooh Big Momma" [Lil Jon & His Boyz]

== 2001–2005 ==
=== 2001 ===
- Lil J – Thuggin' Under the Influence
  - 11. "Haters" (featuring Lil Jon)
- Moochie Mack – Broke Pimpin'
  - 04. "Quit Actin' like Dat" (featuring Lil' Jon)
- Po' White Trash – Po' Like Dis!
  - 08. "Po Punch"
- T.I. – I'm Serious
  - 18. "I'm Serious (Remix)" (featuring Bone Crusher, Pastor Troy, YoungBloodZ and Lil Jon)

=== 2002 ===
- E-40 – Grit & Grind
  - 04. "Rep Yo City" (featuring Lil Jon, 8Ball, Petey Pablo and Bun B)
- Mack 10 – Presents: Da Hood
  - 04. "Everyday" (featuring Techniec and Lil Jon)
- Naughty by Nature – IIcons
  - 13. "Wild Motherfuckas" (featuring Lil Jon and Chyna White)
- Pastor Troy – Universal Soldier
  - 05. "Who, What, When, Where"
  - 07. "4 My Hustlaz"
  - 13. "If They Kill Me"
- Trick Daddy – Thug Holiday
  - 07. "Let's Go" (featuring Lil Jon and Twista)
- Too Short – What's My Favorite Word?
  - 05. "Quit Hatin' Part I" (featuring Lil Jon & Twista)
  - 06. "Quit Hatin' Part II" (featuring Lil Jon & Pimp C)
  - 11. "Call It Gangster" (featuring Dolla Will & Petey Pablo)

=== 2003 ===
- Bow Wow – Unleashed
  - 03. "Eighteen"
  - 12. "To My Mama" (featuring Amerie)
- Bravehearts – Bravehearted
  - 06. "Quick to Back Down" (featuring Nas & Lil Jon)
- David Banner – Mississippi: The Album
  - 03. "Might Getcha" (featuring Lil Jon)
- E-40 – Breakin News
  - 09. "Anybody Can Get It" (featuring Lil Jon & The Eastside Boyz, Bone Crusher & David Banner)
- Magic – White Eyes
  - 02. "War" (featuring Trouble)
- Nappy Roots – Wooden Leather
  - 15. "What Cha Gonna Do? (The Anthem)"
- Rated R – Da Ghetto Psychic
  - 13. "Ride"
- Too Short – Married to the Game
  - 03. "That's How It Goes Down" (featuring Oobie)
  - 04. "You Can't Fuck with Us" (featuring N.O.R.E. & Petey Pablo)
  - 05. "Shake That Monkey" (featuring Lil Jon)
  - 06. "Burn Rubber"
  - 07. "Hey, Let's Go" (featuring Cutty Cartel & Devin the Dude)
- Ying Yang Twins – Me and My Brother
  - 04. "Grey Goose"
  - 05. "Salt Shaker"
- YoungBloodZ – Drankin' Patnaz
  - 02. "Damn!" (featuring Lil Jon)

=== 2004 ===
- Ciara – Goodies
  - 01. "Goodies" (featuring Petey Pablo)
  - 13. "Goodies (Remix)" (featuring T.I. & Jazze Pha)
- I-20 – Self-Explanatory
  - 06. "Break Bread"
- Lil Scrappy – The King of Crunk & BME Recordings Present: Trillville & Lil Scrappy
  - 11. "Crank It"
  - 12. "What the Fuck"
  - 13. "Head Bussa" (featuring Lil Jon)
  - 14. "Bootleg"
  - 15. "No Problem"
  - 16. "Dookie Love Public Service Announcement"
  - 17. "F.I.L.A. (Forever I Love Atlanta)" (featuring Lil Jon)
  - 18. "Crunk Radio"
  - 19. "Diamonds in My Pinky Ring" (featuring Big Nod and Kaskit)
  - 20. "Be Real" (featuring Bohagon)
  - 21. "Gone" (featuring Bohagon)
- Mario – Turning Point
  - 04. "Boom" (featuring Juvenile)
- Master P – Good Side, Bad Side
  - 01. "Act a Fool" (featuring Lil Jon)
  - 06. "Who Them Boyz" (featuring Lil Jon & C-Murder)
- Mobb Deep – Amerikaz Nightmare
  - 09. "Real Gangstaz" (featuring Lil Jon)
- Nivea – Complicated
  - 03. "Okay" (featuring Lil Jon & Youngbloodz)
- Petey Pablo – Still Writing in My Diary: 2nd Entry
  - 03. "Jam Y'all"
  - 04. "Freek-a-Leek"
  - 11. "U Don't Want Dat" (featuring Lil Jon)
- Pitbull – M.I.A.M.I.
  - 01. "305 Anthem" (featuring Lil Jon)
  - 02. "Culo" (featuring Lil Jon)
  - 03. "She's Freaky"
  - 04. "Shake It Up" (featuring Oobie)
  - 05. "Toma" (featuring Lil Jon)
  - 11. "That's Nasty" (featuring Lil Jon & Fat Joe) (Produced by Dj Nasty)
- Snoop Dogg – R&G (Rhythm & Gangsta): The Masterpiece
  - 09. "Step Yo Game Up" (featuring Lil Jon & Trina)
- T.I. – Urban Legend
  - 16. "Stand Up" (featuring Lil Jon, Trick Daddy, & Lil Wayne)
- Teedra Moses – Complex Simplicity
  - 08. "You Better Tell Her" (featuring Lil Scrappy)
- Trillville – The King of Crunk & BME Recordings Present: Trillville & Lil Scrappy
  - 01. "Trillville Radio"
  - 02. "Neva Eva" (featuring Lil Jon & Lil Scrappy)
  - 03. "Get Some Crunk in Yo System" (featuring Pastor Troy)
  - 04. "Goodbye"
  - 05. "Weakest Link"
  - 06. "Bathroom"
  - 07. "Bitch Niggaz" (featuring Lil Scrappy)
  - 08. "Dookie Love"
  - 09. "Some Cut" (featuring Cutty)
  - 10. "The Hood" (featuring Lil Jon)
- Usher – Confessions
  - 02. "Yeah!" (featuring Lil Jon & Ludacris)
  - 19. "Red Light" {bonus track}
- Various Artists – Barbershop 2: Back in Business (soundtrack)
  - 07. "All" [ Olivia ] [co-produced by Sha Money XL]
- Young Buck – Straight Outta Cashville
  - 08. "Shorty Wanna Ride"
- 8Ball & MJG – Living Legends
  - 13. "Look at the Grillz" (featuring Twista and T.I.)

=== 2005 ===
- Three 6 Mafia – Choices II: The Setup
  - 06. "Itz Whateva Wit Us"(feat. D-Roc and YoungBloodZ) (produced with DJ Paul and Juicy J)
- Amerie – Touch
  - 03. "Touch"
- Brooke Valentine – Chain Letter
  - 01. "Girlfight" (featuring Lil Jon & Big Boi)
- Bun B – Trill
  - 06. "Trill Recognize Trill" (featuring Ludacris)
- David Banner – Certified
  - 02. "Treat Me Like" (featuring Jadakiss)
- Fat Joe – All or Nothing
  - 14. "Lean Back (Remix)" (featuring Lil Jon, Mase & Eminem)
- P$C – 25 to Life
  - 06. "I'm a King" (featuring Lil Scrappy)
- Trina – Glamorest Life
  - 03. "Shake" (featuring Lil Scrappy)
- YoungBloodZ – Ev'rybody Know Me
  - 02. "Presidential"

== 2006–2010 ==
=== 2006 ===
- Ciara – Ciara: The Evolution
  - 01. "That's Right" (featuring Lil Jon)
  - 07. "C.R.U.S.H."
- E-40 – My Ghetto Report Card
  - 02. "Tell Me When to Go" (featuring Keak Da Sneak)
  - 03. "Muscle Cars" (featuring Keak Da Sneak & Turf Talk)
  - 11. "White Gurl" (featuring UGK & Juelz Santana)
  - 13. "U and Dat" (featuring T-Pain & Kandi Girl)
  - 14. "I'm Da Man" (featuring Mike Jones & Al Kapone)
  - 15. "Yee" (featuring Too Short & Budda)
  - 18. "Gimme Head" (featuring Al Kapone & Bosko)
  - 19. "She Says She Loves Me" (featuring 8Ball & Bun B)
- Ice Cube – Laugh Now, Cry Later
  - 10. "Go to Church" (featuring Lil Jon & Snoop Dogg)
  - 18. "You Got Lotta That" (featuring Snoop Dogg)
  - 20. "Holla @ Cha Boy"
- Janet Jackson – "Call on Me"
  - "Call on Me" (with Nelly) [Lil Jon Remix]
- Juvenile – Reality Check
  - 14. "Why Not" (featuring Skip)
- Lil Scrappy – Bred 2 Die, Born 2 Live
  - 01. "I'm Back"
  - 05. "Been a Boss"
  - 06. "Gangsta, Gangsta" (featuring. Lil Jon)
  - 10. "Born to Live" (featuring Rick Ross & Brisco)
  - 15. "Police"
  - 20. "Oh Yeah (Work)" (featuring Sean P. & E-40)
- MC Hammer – Look Look Look
  - 03. "YAY"
- Pitbull – El Mariel
  - 16. "Voodoo"
  - 19. "Bojangles (Remix)" (featuring Lil Jon & Ying Yang Twins)
- Too Short – Blow the Whistle
  - 02. "Blow the Whistle"
  - 03. "Burn Rubber Pt 2"
  - 06. "Money Maker" (featuring Pimp C & Rick Ross)
  - 13. "Sadity" (featuring Tha Dogg Pound)
  - 15. "It's Time to Go"
  - 16. "Shake It Baby"

=== 2007 ===
- Baby Bash – Cyclone
  - 02. "Cyclone" (featuring T-Pain)
- DJ Drama – Gangsta Grillz: The Album
  - 18. "Grillz Gleaming" (featuring Princess, Diamond, Lil Scrappy and Bohagon)
- Pitbull – The Boatlift
  - 06. "Ying and the Yang"
  - 07. "The Anthem" (featuring Lil Jon)
  - 10. "Sticky Icky" (featuring Jim Jones)
- UGK – Underground Kingz
  - 10. "Like That"
- Young Buck – Buck the World
  - 12. "Money Good"

=== 2008 ===
- E-40 – The Ball Street Journal
  - 03. "Break Ya Ankles" (featuring Shawty Lo)
  - 08. "Hustle" (featuring Turf Talk & Rock City)
  - 10. "40 Water"
  - 14. "Earl" (featuring Ice-T)
- Trick Trick – The Villain
  - 10. "Let it Fly" (featuring Ice Cube)

=== 2009 ===
- Mickey Avalon – "What Do You Say"
  - 01. "What Do You Say" (featuring Dirt Nasty, Cisco Adler, Andre Legacy)
- Pitbull – Rebelution
  - 03. "I Know You Want Me (Calle Ocho)"
  - 11. "Krazy" (featuring Lil Jon)
- Snoop Dogg – Malice n Wonderland
  - 04. "1800" (featuring Lil Jon)
- Tha Dogg Pound – That Was Then, This Is Now
  - 10. "No'mo' Police Brutality"
- The-Dream – Love vs. Money
  - 14. "Booty" (featuring Lil Jon)

=== 2010 ===
- Big Boi – Sir Lucious Left Foot: The Son of Chico Dusty
  - 09. "Hustle Blood" (featuring Jamie Foxx)
- Kurupt – Streetlights
  - 10. Riot in the Club
- Waka Flocka Flame – Flockaveli
  - 16. "Smoke, Drank" (featuring Mouse & Kebo Gotti)

== 2011–present ==
=== 2024 ===
- Ice Cube – Man Down
  - 16. "Talkin' Bout These Rappers"

== Produced singles ==
- 2002: "I Don't Give a Fuck" (featuring Mystikal & Krayzie Bone)
- 2003: "Get Low" (featuring Ying Yang Twins)
- 2003: "Damn!" (Youngbloodz featuring Lil Jon)
- 2003: "Salt Shaker" (Ying Yang Twins featuring Lil Jon)
- 2003: " Come Get Some" (TLC featuring Lil Jon)
- 2003: "Quick to Back Down" (Bravehearts featuring Nas and Lil Jon)
- 2004: "Yeah!" (Usher featuring Lil Jon & Ludacris)
- 2004: "Culo" (Pitbull featuring Lil Jon)
- 2004: "Toma" (Pitbull featuring Lil Jon)
- 2003: "Freek-A-Leek" (Petey Pablo)
- 2004: "Goodies" (Ciara featuring Petey Pablo)
- 2004: "Real Gangstaz" (Mobb Deep featuring Lil Jon)
- 2004: "Head Bussa" (Lil Scrappy featuring Lil Jon)
- 2004: "Neva Eva" (Trillville featuring Lil Jon & Lil Scrappy)
- 2004: "No Problem" (Lil Scrappy)
- 2004: "Some Cut" (Trillville featuring Cutty)
- 2004: "Shorty Wanna Ride" (Young Buck)
- 2004: "What U Gon' Do" (featuring Lil Scrappy)
- 2004: "Lovers and Friends" (featuring Usher & Ludacris)
- 2004: "Real Nigga Roll Call" (featuring Ice Cube)
- 2005: "Girlfight" (Brooke Valentine featuring Lil Jon & Big Boi)
- 2005: "Boom" (Mario featuring Juvenile)
- 2005: "Presidential" (YoungBloodz)
- 2005: "Touch" (Amerie)
- 2005: "Okay" (Nivea featuring Lil Jon & YoungBloodZ)
- 2005: "I'm A King" P$C (Featuring T.I.)
- 2005: "I Don't Care" (Ricky Martin featuring Fat Joe and Amerie)
- 2006: "Tell Me When To Go" (E-40 featuring Keak Da Sneak)
- 2006: "U and Dat" (E-40 featuring T-Pain & Kandi Girl)
- 2006 "Blow The Whistle" (Too Short)
- 2006: "Snap Yo Fingers" (featuring E-40 & Sean P)
- 2006: "Bojangles (remix)" (Pitbull featuring Lil Jon & Ying Yang Twins)
- 2006: "Go to Church" (Ice Cube featuring Lil Jon & Snoop Dogg)
- 2006: "Gangsta Gangsta" (Lil Scrappy featuring Lil Jon)
- 2007: "Oh Yeah (Work)" (Lil Scrappy featuring Sean P & E-40)
- 2007: "Cyclone" (Baby Bash featuring T-Pain)
- 2007: "That's Right" (Ciara featuring Lil Jon)
- 2007: "The Anthem" (Pitbull featuring Lil Jon)
- 2007: "Throw Some D's (Remix)" (Rich Boy featuring André 3000, Jim Jones, Murphy Lee, Nelly & The Game)
- 2008: "Turf Drop" (E-40)
- 2008: "Untitled" (Ciara featuring Lil Jon)
- 2008: "Dat Baby" (Shawty Putt featuring Lil Jon)
- 2008: "Booty" (The-Dream co-produced by Lil Jon)
- 2008: "That's How I Go" (Baby Bash featuring Mario)
- 2009: "Get Up on It" (Mams Taylor featuring Lil' Kim & The Game)
- 2009: "Krazy" (Pitbull featuring Lil Jon)
- 2009: "I Know You Want Me (Calle Ocho)" (Pitbull)
- 2011: "Twisted" (Gorilla Zoe)
- 2011: "Hard White (Up In The Club)" (Yelawolf)
- 2016: "Take It Off" (Lil Jon, Becky G & Yandel)
- 2019: "Ain't No Tellin'" (Lil Jon, Mac Dre)
- 2022: "Vamos A Beber" (Lil Jon, KD One)
- 2023: "Glu" (Usher)
- 2023: "What We On" (Lil Jon, Daboii & P-LO featuring E-40)
- 2023: "Sneaky Link" (Lil Jon & NyNy)
