= List of awards and nominations received by Mario (American singer) =

Mario awards and nominations
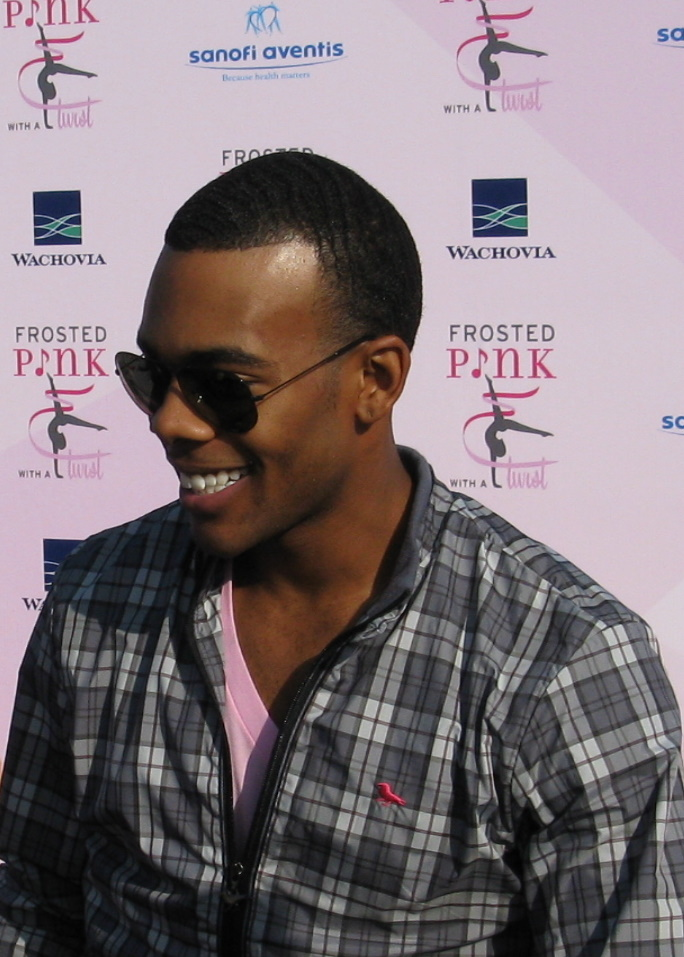
- Mario being interviewed at a charity event for cancer in San Diego, September 14, 2008
Awards and nominations
Award	Wins	Nominations
BET	0	2
Billboard	2	5
Grammy	0	2
MOBO	0	1
MTV VMA	0	2
Soul Train	0	2
Teen Choice	0	3
Billboard R&B/Hip-Hop Awards	2	2
Prism Awards	1	1
Vibe Awards	0	1

Totals (Note: Certain award groups do not simply award one winner. They acknowledge several different recipients, have runners-up, and have third place. Since this is a specific recognition and is different from losing an award, runner-up mentions are considered wins in this award tally. For simplification and to avoid errors, each award in this list has been presumed to have had a prior nomination.)
- Wins: 5
- Nominations: 21

Mario is an American R&B and pop singer-songwriter, dancer, actor and model. Mario has released four studio albums. Teen-age R&B newcomer, Mario Barrett was born in Maryland, at the age of 15, Mario debuted with the release of "Just a Friend 2002", produced by Warryn Campbell and based on rapper Biz Markie's hit "Just a Friend". His self-titled album followed in July, featuring contributions by Grammy-winning Alicia Keys, the album went gold on RIAA. Turning Point, released in 2004, went to number two on the R&B album chart, hoisted by the ubiquitous smash hit "Let Me Love You", the single had so much success that gave to Mario all the winning awards of music, that he has, the CD Single was certificated Platinum in U.S. and in Australia, Turning Point was certificated Platinum in the U.S., the follow singles hadn't so much success has the first one, these are: How Could You, Here I Go Again and Boom featuring Juvenile (rapper). The December 2007 release of Mario's third album, Go, was preceded by several delays and projected release dates; its initial date was November of the previous year, it features the singles How Do I Breathe and the Top five hit Crying out for Me, which was certificated Gold by the Recording Industry Association of America (RIAA). D.N.A., Mario's fourth album, was released in October 2009. At the time, two of its songs, "Break Up" which served as the lead single, and was number one for seven consecutive weeks on Billboard Mainstream R&B/Hip-Hop chart, with help from Gucci Mane and Sean Garrett and was also certificated Gold by the Recording Industry Association of America (RIAA), as a ringtone. "Thinkin' About You," was released as the second single, were already on the singles charts.

In 2004 Mario at the Vibe Awards "Let Me Love You" was nominated for Best R&B Song, at the Teen Choice Awards "Let Me love You" was nominated twice, the first was Choice Love Song and the second Choice R&B/Rap Track, but didn't receive any award. In 2005 has received several nominations at the Billboard Music Awards; among these are Hot 100 Single of the Year and Hot 100 Singles Track of the Year (Airplay) for "Let Me Love You", "Hot 100 Artist of the Year – Male", he also received four nominations for "Hot R&B/Hip-Hop Single of the Year", "Hot R&B/Hip-Hop Single of the Year (Airplay)", "Top R&B/Hip-Hop Single of the Year", "Top R&B/Hip-Hop Single of the Year (Airplay)" which has won all with the breakthrough hit single "Let Me Love You"; nominated also for Best R&B Single at the MTV Europe Music Awards, for Best Male Artist R&B and Viewer's Choice for "Let Me Love You" at the BET Awards and Best Single "Let Me Love You" at the MOBO Awards also nominated at the Soul Train Music Awards for Best R&B/Soul with "Let Me Love You". In 2006, at the Grammy Awards has been nominated in the category of Best Contemporary R&B Album with "Turning Point" and Best Male R&B Vocal Performance with "Let Me Love You", at MTV Australia Awards the music video for "Let Me Love You" has been nominated for Best R&B Video. In 2008 "I Won't Love You to Death: The Story of Mario and His Mom" was nominated for the category of "Television: Teen Program" at the Prism Awards which won. In 2009, the music nominations returned so far "Break Up", which features Gucci Mane and Sean Garrett, was nominated for Best Collaboration at the Soul Train Music Awards, In 2010 he was nominated for "Favorite Male Singer" at the Teen Choice Awards. Overall, Mario has received 5 awards from 21 nominations.

== BET Awards ==
The BET Awards were established in 2001 by the Black Entertainment Television (BET) network to celebrate African Americans and other minorities in music, acting, sports, and other fields of entertainment. Mario has received two nominations.

Year	Nominee / work	Award	Result
2005	Mario	Best Male Artist – R&B	Nominated
2005	"Let Me Love You"	Viewer's Choice	Nominated

== Billboard Music Awards ==
The Billboard Music Awards are sponsored by Billboard magazine and is held annually in December. The awards are based on sales data by Nielsen SoundScan and radio information by Nielsen Broadcast Data Systems. Mario has received two awards from five nominations.

Year	Nominee / work	Award	Result
2005	Mario	Hot 100 Artist of the Year – Male	Nominated
2005	"Let Me Love You"	Hot 100 Single of the Year	Nominated
2005	"Let Me Love You"	Hot 100 Singles Track of the Year (Airplay)	Nominated
2005	"Let Me Love You"	Hot R&B/Hip—Hop Single of the Year	Won
2005	"Let Me Love You"	Hot R&B/Hip—Hop Single of the Year (Airplay)	Won

== Billboard R&B/Hip-Hop Awards ==
The Billboard R&B/Hip-Hop Awards reflect the performance of recordings on the Hot R&B/Hip-Hop Songs and Hot Rap Tracks. Mario has received two awards from two nominations.

Year	Nominee / work	Award	Result
2005	"Let Me Love You"	Top R&B/Hip—Hop Single of the Year	Won
2005	"Let Me Love You"	Top R&B/Hip—Hop Single of the Year (Airplay)	Won

== Grammy Awards ==
The Grammy Awards are awarded annually by the National Academy of Recording Arts and Sciences. Mario has received two nominations.

Year	Nominee / work	Award	Result
2006	"Turning Point"	Best Contemporary R&B Album	Nominated
2006	"Let Me Love You"	Best Male R&B Vocal Performance	Nominated

== MOBO Awards ==
The MOBO Awards (an acronym for "Music of Black Origin") were established in 1996 by Kanya King. They are held annually in the United Kingdom to recognize artists of any race or nationality performing music of black origin. Mario has received 1 nomination.

Year	Nominee / work	Award	Result
2005	Let Me Love You	Best Single	Nominated

== MTV Video Music Awards ==
The MTV Video Music Awards were established in the end of the summer of 1984 by MTV to celebrate the top music videos of the year. Mario has received two nominations in two different categories.

=== MTV Australia Awards ===
The MTV Australia Awards started in 2005 and is Australia's first awards show to celebrate both local and international acts. Mario has received one nomination.

Year	Nominee / work	Award	Result
2006	"Let Me Love You"	Best R&B Video	Nominated

=== MTV Europe Music Awards ===
The MTV Europe Music Awards were established in 1994 by MTV Europe to celebrate the most popular music videos in Europe. Mario has received one nomination.

Year	Nominee / work	Award	Result
2005	"Let Me Love You"	Best R&B Single	Nominated

== Prism Awards ==
The Prism Awards concentrate on drug, alcohol and tobacco issues. Mario has received one award from one nomination.

Year	Nominee / work	Award	Result
2008	I Won't Love You to Death: The Story of Mario and His Mom	Television: Teen Program	Won

== Soul Train Music Awards ==
The Soul Train Music Awards is an annual award show aired in national broadcast syndication that honors the best in African American music and entertainment established in 1987. Mario has received two nominations.

Year	Nominee / work	Award	Result
2005	"Let Me Love You"	Best R&B/Soul Single	Nominated
2009	"Break Up" (with Gucci Mane and Sean Garrett)	Best Collaboration	Nominated

== Teen Choice Awards ==
The Teen Choice Awards were established in 1999 to honor the year's biggest achievements in music, movies, sports and television, as voted for by young people aged between 13 and 19. Mario has received three nominations

Year	Nominee / work	Award	Result
2004	"Let Me Love You"	Choice Love Song	Nominated
2004	"Let Me Love You"	Choice R&B/Rap Track	Nominated
2010	"Mario"	Favorite Male Singer	Nominated

== Vibe Awards ==
The Vibe Awards were established in 2003, the magazine has put on its annual award show, held on UPN. Mario has received one nomination.

Year	Nominee / work	Award	Result
2004	"Let Me Love You"	Best R&B Song	Nominated
