= September Love =

1961 film

Septemberliebe
- Directed by: Kurt Maetzig
- Written by: Herbert Otto
- Produced by: Hans Mahlich
- Starring: Doris Abeßer
- Cinematography: Joachim Hasler
- Edited by: Lena Neumann
- Music by: Helmut Nier
- Distributed by: Progress Film
- Release date: 8 February 1961
- Running time: 78 minutes
- Country: East Germany
- Language: German

September Love (German: Septemberliebe) is an East German film directed by Kurt Maetzig. It was released in 1961.

== Plot ==
Leading chemist Hans Schramm is betrothed to Hanna, but falls in love with her younger sister Franka. The two attempt to repress their feelings, but eventually begin an affair. When Hans is extorted by a group of West German agents, who demand to know about his classified work, he is gripped by panic and decides the only way out is to flee to the West. Franka discovers his plans and informs the Stasi. Hans perceives it as betrayal at first, but after all ends well, he realizes she only wanted the best for him.

== Cast ==
- Doris Abeßer - Franka
- Ulrich Thein - Dr. Hans Schramm
- Annekathrin Bürger - Hanna
- Hans Lucke - Lieutenant Unger
- Kurt Dunkelmann - Priest Hübenthal
- Anna-Maria Besendahl -Hans' mother
- Micaëla Kreißler - Milli
- Heinz Laggies - Stasi agent
- Karl Heinz Oppel - Stasi agent

== Production ==
While the Khrushchev Thaw allowed a considerable degree of liberalization in all Eastern Bloc countries, including in East Germany, the commitment of DEFA to follow the Socialist Unity Party of Germany's line was reaffirmed in the 1958 Bitterfeld Conference; although many pictures with less ideological restrictions were made at the time, the studio devoted considerable resources to produce films about the East-West tensions between the two Germanies. September Love was one of eight major works of this genre made between 1959 and 1964.

Maetzig told an interviewer that he was influenced by the sharpening political climate, on the eve of the erection of the Berlin Wall: "it became clear that a confrontation of some kind was brewing... We could not stand and watch... As events lurched toward a crisis".

The script was adapted from Herbert Otto's novel by the same name.

== Reception ==
The film was a commercial success and received well by the audiences.

Peter Ulrich Weiss regarded September Love as a continuation of DEFA's long-established tradition of "Saboteur Thrillers", pitting the East German populace against a menace from the West. Mira and Antonín J. Liehm viewed it also as a forerunner of a new subgenre, aimed at rationalizing the building of the Wall, but using a new setting, mostly love stories, rather than plain political agitation. Heinz Kersten defined the film as "a completely incontroversial romance, that is remarkable for the unusual quality of the acting... but still propagates the old political message." Joshua Feinstein categorized September Love among the East German films focusing on the exploits of a single female protagonist, a theme that was popular with DEFA. Philip Broadbent and Sabine Hake noted that it was one of several pictures made during the early 1960s that "insisted on the unifying effect" that the closed border with the West had on ordinary people.

== Also Known As ==
The song "September Love" by INOJ is a major production releasing June 8, 2018 worldwide. INOJ is a celebrity singer and songwriter best known for her debut single, "Love You Down", a cover of Ready for the World's 1986 hit that reached #25 in the United States. Her debut album was also named Ready for the World. INOJ released a cover version of Cyndi Lauper's "Time After Time" under Columbia Records in 1998, which was a Top 10 hit in the United States (#6), Canada (#7), and New Zealand (#10). In 1998, she released her debut album, Ready for the World. She also released a cover version of "Ring My Bell" as a single, though it did not receive much exposure.
