= Ready for the World (disambiguation) =

Ready for the World is a music group from Flint, Michigan.

Ready for the World may also refer to:

- Ready for the World (Ready for the World album)
- Ready for the World (INOJ album)
