= Love Me Right =

Love Me Right may refer to:

- Love Me Right (Angel City album), 2005
- Love Me Right (Exo album), 2015
- "Love Me Right" (song), by Exo, 2015
- "Love Me Right (Oh Sheila)", by Angel City, 1999
- "Love Me Right", a song by Gretta Ray from the 2021 album Begin to Look Around
- "Love Me Right", a song by Lady Gaga from the 2020 album Chromatica
