= Money in the Bank =

Money in the Bank may refer to:

- Money in the Bank (novel), a 1942 comedy novel by P. G. Wodehouse
- Money in the Bank ladder match, a professional wrestling match held since 2005
- WWE Money in the Bank, an annual professional wrestling event based on the above match type
- Money in the Bank, 1979 Australian TV film starring Tom Richards

== Music ==
- "Money in the Bank" (John Anderson song), 1993
- "Money in the Bank" (Lil Scrappy song), 2006
- "Money in the Bank" (Swizz Beatz song), 2007
- Money in the Bank, rap mixtape series by Lloyd Banks hosted by DJ Whoo Kid
