= Some Cut =

Single by Trillville featuring Cutty

from the album The King of Crunk & BME Present: Trillville & Lil Scrappy
- Released: December 22, 2004
- Recorded: 2003
- Studio: Stankonia Recording (Atlanta, Georgia)
- Genre: Hip hop; crunk; dirty rap
- Length: 4:43
- Label: Warner Bros./BME
- Composers: Jonathan Smith; Donnell Prince; Lawrence Edwards; Jamal Glaze; Craig Love; LaMarquis Jefferson
- Producer: Lil Jon

Trillville singles chronology
"Neva Eva" (2003)	"Some Cut" (2004)	"I'm Pimpin'" (2005)

Music video
- "Some Cut" on YouTube

"Some Cut" is a song recorded by American hip hop group Trillville featuring guest vocals by rapper Cutty Cartel. The track was released as the second single from Trillville's debut album, The King of Crunk & BME Present: Trillville & Lil Scrappy (2004). "Some Cut" was the group's biggest hit single; it peaked at number fourteen on the Billboard Hot 100 in 2005. The song was a popular ringtone for mobile phones in the U.S. at the time of its release; it was certified platinum by the Recording Industry Association of America on the strength of those sales in 2006.

The song's beat, programmed by American rapper Lil Jon, is built around a sample of a squeaking chair, purported to sound like a mattress creaking during sex. Consequently, Trillville's lyrics take a sexually explicit approach. The song was recorded in Atlanta, Georgia, and is an example of the city's club-oriented crunk subgenre, popularized by Lil Jon in the 2000s. Its distinctive squeak sample has been referenced by several international pop and rap artists, particularly among Korean pop groups.

== Background ==
The song's beat was created by American rapper Lil Jon, who had discovered Trillville at a sold-out concert several years prior. It was recorded at Stankonia Recording in Atlanta, Georgia. Jon reminisced on the song's development in a 2018 interview with Rolling Stone:

We were in the studio, I was making a beat with my boy Craig Love, who plays guitar, and Le Marquis Jefferson, who plays bass. I’m rocking back and forth in the chair as I’m making the beat. Craig’s like, ‘you hear that?’ ‘What you talkin’ about?’ ‘The chair is squeaking on the beat.’ ‘Holy shit!’ So we mic’d up the chair, I put on headphones, rocked back and forth and we recorded that and put it into the track.

== Reception and legacy ==
The song was well received. David Jeffries at AllMusic called the song's backbeat "a brilliant bit of production from Lil Jon." Elias Leight at Rolling Stone referred to the single as "crunk landmark." The song's distinctive bedspring noise has been imitated in several songs, including those by fellow rap artists Drake, Wale and Ty Dolla $ign, and by international pop artists such as Tinashe, Karol G, Bruno Mars, and Jacquees. Leight notes the sample is particularly popular in Korean pop music, where it is referred to in songs by artists like NCT 127, Exo, and Shinee. The sample is also often used in Baltimore club and Jersey club music.

A remix with rappers Pitbull and Snoop Dogg was also released in 2004.

In 2023, American rapper Doechii interpolated "Some Cut" on her single "What It Is (Block Boy)", reaching number 29 on the Billboard Hot 100.

== Chart performance ==
The song reached #14 on the Billboard Hot 100, #7 on the R&B/Hip-Hop Songs chart, and #3 on the Rap Songs chart. The song made it on the Billboard Year-End Hot 100 singles of 2005 at number 49.

== Music video ==
The song's music video starts with Trillville buying a house from the owners, and they throw a house party. Trillville and Lil Jon sell the house a day later after the house party. E-40, Lil Jon, Diamond (rapper) and Porsha Williams make appearances.

== Personnel ==
Credits adapted from the liner notes for The King of Crunk & BME Present: Trillville & Lil Scrappy.

- Jonathan Smith – production, mixing, songwriting
- Donnell Prince – songwriting
- Lawrence Edwards – songwriting
- Jamal Glaze – songwriting
- Craig Love – songwriting, guitar
- LaMarquis Jefferson – songwriting, bass guitar
- John Frye – mixing
- Warren Bletcher – assistant mixing

== Charts ==
=== Weekly charts ===
Weekly Chart performance for "Some Cut"
Chart (2004–2005)	Peak position
US Billboard Hot 100	14
US Hot R&B/Hip-Hop Songs (Billboard)	7
US Hot Rap Songs (Billboard)	3
US Pop Airplay (Billboard)	32
US Rhythmic Airplay (Billboard)	3

=== Year-end charts ===
Year-end chart performance for "Some Cut"
Chart (2005)	Position
US Billboard Hot 100	49
US Hot R&B/Hip-Hop Songs (Billboard)	17
US Rhythmic (Billboard)	20

== Release history ==
Region	Date	Format(s)	Label(s)	Ref.
United States	November 8, 2004	Urban contemporary radio	BME, Warner	
United States	March 14, 2005	Contemporary hit radio	BME, Warner	
