= Long Time Coming (Ready for the World album) =

Studio album by Ready for the World
- Released: November 10, 1986
- Recorded: 1985–1986
- Genre: R&B
- Length: 47:41
- Label: MCA
- Producer: Gary Spaniola; Ready for the World

Ready for the World chronology
Ready for the World (1985)	Long Time Coming (1986)	Ruff N' Ready (1988)

Singles from Long Time Coming
- 1. "Love You Down" Released: November 1986; 2. "Mary Goes Round" Released: 1987; 3. "Long Time Coming" Released: 1987; 4. "Here I Am" Released: 1987

Professional ratings
Review scores
Source	Rating
AllMusic	3/5 stars
Christgau's Record Guide	C+

Long Time Coming is the second album by American R&B group Ready for the World. Three hits were scored from the album, including "Love You Down". It was released on November 10, 1986, on MCA Records.

== Track listing ==
No.	Title	Writer(s)	Length
1.	"Love You Down"	Melvin Riley	6:29
2.	"Baby (Let Me Love You)"	Melvin Riley	4:16
3.	"Long Time Coming"	Gregory Potts, John Eaton, Melvin Riley	4:25
4.	"So in Love"	Gary Spaniola, John Eaton, Melvin Riley	4:52
5.	"In My Room"	Melvin Riley	5:01
6.	"Mary Goes 'Round"	John Eaton, Melvin Riley	4:38
7.	"Some People Don't Care"	Gordon Strozier, Melvin Riley	5:08
8.	"Here I Am"	Gary Spaniola, Gregory Potts, Melvin Riley	4:50
9.	"It's All a Game"	Melvin Riley	4:09
10.	"Do You Get Enough"	Gordon Strozier, John Eaton, Melvin Riley, Willie Triplett	3:51

== Personnel ==
Ready for the World

- Melvin Riley Jr.: vocals, rhythm guitar, keyboards
- Gordon Strozier: lead guitar, backing vocals
- Gregory Potts: keyboards, synthesizers, backing vocals
- John Eaton: bass, backing vocals
- Gerald Valentine: drums
- Willie Triplett: percussion, keyboards, backing vocals

Additional musicians

- Gary Spaniola: additional guitar on "So in Love" - "Here I Am" and "Love You Down"
- Andrea Fheh: groupie's voice on "Mary Goes 'Round"

== Charts ==
=== Weekly charts ===
Chart (1986–1987)	Peak position
US Billboard 200	32
US Top R&B/Hip-Hop Albums (Billboard)	5

=== Year-end charts ===
Chart (1987)	Position
US Top R&B/Hip-Hop Albums (Billboard)	29
