= Prince of the South =

Studio album by Lil Scrappy
- Released: May 13, 2008
- Recorded: 2007–2008
- Genre: Hip hop
- Label: Real Talk; Koch
- Producer: Derrick "Sac" Johnson, Big Hollis

Lil Scrappy chronology
Bred 2 Die, Born 2 Live (2006)	Prince of the South (2008)	Prince of the South 2 (2010)

Prince of the South is the second album by Atlanta rapper Lil Scrappy, released on in 2008. The album features guest appearances by down-south-based rappers Lil' Flip and J-Bo of YoungBloodZ.

== Track listing ==
No.	Title	Producer(s)	Length
1.	"G's Up"	Real Talk Ent.	1:31
2.	"The A"	Hollis & Preach	3:21
3.	"Keep It on the Low"	Hollis & Preach	3:43
4.	"Wassup"	Hollis & Preach	3:54
5.	"Take Advantage"	Hollis & Preach	0:14
6.	"Smoke, Ride & Get Paid"	Hollis & Preach	3:48
7.	"The World Is Mine" (featuring Lil' Flip)	Real Talk Ent.	4:27
8.	"Fo Sho"	Hollis & Preach	3:43
9.	"All Hunid's"	Hollis & Preach	3:35
10.	"Believe"	Hollis & Preach	0:29
11.	"You Trippin'" (featuring Lil' Flip)	Hollis & Preach	4:45
12.	"Throwin' Up Dat"	Hollis & Preach	3:23
13.	"Move Somethin'"	Real Talk Ent.	3:21
14.	"Wassup, Wassup" (featuring J-Bo of the YoungBloodZ)	Hollis & Preach	5:07
15.	"Prince of the South"	Real Talk Ent.	1:51

Digital bonus tracks
No.	Title	Producer(s)	Length
16.	"Aye Shawty"	Hollis	3:47
17.	"When I Grind" (featuring Lil' Flip)	Hollis	4:30

== Charts ==
Chart	Peak position
US Top R&B/Hip-Hop Albums	22
US Top Independent Albums	1
