= Lara McAllen =

- Also known as: Angel City
- Origin: Guildford, Surrey, England
- Genre: EDM
- Years active: 2003–present
- Labels: Data Records, Ultra Records, Ministry of Sound (UK, 2003–present)

Lara McAllen is an English singer, songwriter and vocal producer.

== Biography ==
McAllen was the singer for the dance-pop music project Angel City. She began dancing at the age of five, and became a backing dancer for pop singer Shakira at age 19. She then began her career as a dance music vocalist when she signed her first recording contract with Ministry of Sound at age 20. Her debut single "Love Me Right" was picked up by Radio 1 as a Record of the week and soon crossed over from dancefloor filler to mainstream chart hit both in the UK and Europe. "Love Me Right" topped the US Dance Chart as well as entering the Billboard chart. Before Angel City, McAllen found success with Stuart's 2001 house release "Free (Let It Be)", released through Incentive, an offshoot of Ministry of Sound.

McAllen performed all the tracks on the debut album Love Me Right. She had further UK top 10 records as an artist before pursuing work both in vocal production and songwriting. She has also presented for Sky TV channels on programmes such as FYC as well as co-presenting on Capital Disney Radio and Liverpool's Radio City. McAllen has appeared on TV shows such as Never Mind the Buzzcocks, CD:UK, Des and Mel, This Morning and performed "Love Me Right" on Top of the Pops.

Between 2008 and 2010, several collaborations featuring McAllen (both vocals and songwriting) were included on Clubland albums released through All Around the World. Having claimed that she was happier away from the performance side, McAllen again performed lead vocals on Angel City's most recent single "Where Have You Been", released on Ultra Records in 2024.

McAllen has appeared in various media shoots including OK!, Hello! and Marie Claire, as well as shoots for Loaded, Maxim and FHM.

In October 2023, having spent more than ten years away from the industry, McAllen returned to the Clubland family to perform as Angel City at the Clubland Weekender Festival in Blackpool.

Since returning to music she has collaborated with international touring DJ’s on various new single releases on labels such as Anjunabeats, Ultra and Relentless Records. Dream Away with Amy Wiles was a notable release in 2025, followed by a collaboration with York and Ruben de Ronde later in the year. The highlight of 2025 was a re-work of Love Me Right released in July which secured radio support from Kiss FM (weekend anthem) and Radio One. 2026 began with the trance single “Sun Never Rose” which Lara wrote with Andrew Rayel.

== Personal life ==
McAllen was educated at Sir William Perkins's School, Chertsey, and attended dance classes at Susan Driver Dance Academy in London.

McAllen is married to an IT business owner and they have two children. They celebrated with a Christian wedding ceremony in Italy with only close family and friends present.

== Discography ==
=== Albums ===
Year	Album	Artist	UK
2005	Love Me Right	Angel City	44

=== Singles ===
Year	Single	Artist	UK	UK Dance	US	US Dance
2003	"Love Me Right"	Angel City	11	1	35	1
2003	"Get Back"	DJ Tonka feat. Lara McAllen	--	--	--	--
2004	"Touch Me"	Angel City	18	2	--	--
2005	"Do You Know (I Go Crazy)"	Angel City	8	1	--	1
2005	"Sunrise"	Angel City	9	1	--	1
2007	"24/7"	Angel City	--	--	--	--
2007	"Piece of Heaven"	Beat Players feat. Lara McAllen	--	--	--	--
2008	"A Girl Like Me"	Flip & Fill feat. Lara McAllen	--	2	--	--
2008	"Heartbeat"	Flip & Fill feat. Lara McAllen	--	--	--	--
