= Straight Down to Business =

Studio album by Ready for the World
- Released: 1991
- Recorded: 1990–1991
- Genre: New jack swing, hip hop, house
- Label: MCA

Ready for the World chronology
Ruff N' Ready (1988)	Straight Down to Business (1991)	She Said She Wants Some (2004)

Straight Down to Business is the fourth album by the American musical group Ready for the World, released in 1991 via MCA Records. "Straight Down to Business" was released as a single.

== Critical reception ==
Professional ratings
Review scores
Source	Rating
AllMusic	3/5 stars
Sun-Sentinel	mixed

The Washington Post wrote that "between the scratches and samples, RFTW sing characteristically steamy ballads like the harmonic "Ask Your Lover'."

== Track listing ==
1. "Nuttin' but a Party"
2. "Straight Down to Business"
3. "Cat-Thang"
4. "World Party"
5. "Ask Your Lover"
6. "P.B.S.L."
7. "Can He Do It (Like This, Can He Do It Like That)?"
8. "No More Mr. Nice Guy"
9. "Yo, That's a Lot of Body"
10. "Panties and Draws"
11. "Would You Make Me"
12. "Cat-Thang (Mental Mix)"
