= Ready for the World (Ready for the World album) =

Studio album by Ready for the World
- Released: May 14, 1985
- Recorded: 1984–1985
- Studio: Silver Sun Recording Studio (Flint, Michigan)
- Genre: R&B; new wave
- Length: 42:28
- Label: MCA
- Producer: Ready for the World

Ready for the World chronology
Ready for the World (1985)	Long Time Coming (1986)

Singles from Ready for the World
- 1. "Tonight" Released: 1984; 2. "Deep Inside Your Love" Released: 1984; 3. "Oh Sheila" Released: 1985; 4. "Digital Display" Released: 1985; 5. "Slide Over" Released: 1985; 6. "Ceramic Girl" Released: 1986

Professional ratings
Review scores
Source	Rating
AllMusic	4.5/5 stars
Christgau's Record Guide	B+

Ready for the World is the debut album from the Michigan-based band Ready for the World. It was self-produced by the band and released on May 14, 1985, by MCA Records.

== History ==
Of the nine songs appearing on the original album, six were released as singles. The lead track, "Tonight", did not chart on the Billboard Hot 100, only reaching number 103, but the single charted on the R&B chart, where it peaked at number 6. Their second single, "Deep Inside Your Love" also peaked at number 6 on the R&B chart.

The next single, "Oh Sheila", peaked at number one on the Billboard Hot 100, the R&B chart, and the dance chart, it reached the UK Singles Chart, where it peaked at number 50. "Digital Display" reached number 21 on the pop chart, number 4 on the R&B chart, as well as charting number 3 on the dance chart.

The last two singles: "Slide Over" and "Ceramic Girl", reached numbers 57 and 82 on the R&B chart, respectively. Later, the album cut "Human Toy" was used as the A-side and B-side for their 1986 single, "Love You Down".

The album itself sold well and was later certified platinum by the Recording Industry Association of America for reaching sales of over one million copies in the United States. It reached a peak of number 17 on the pop album charts, while reaching number 3 on the R&B album charts.

== Track listing ==
Credits adapted from Discogs.

Side One
No.	Title	Writer(s)	Length
1.	"Tonight"	Gordon Strozier; Melvin Riley Jr.	4:58
2.	"Digital Display"	Gregory Potts	5:36
3.	"Ceramic Girl"	Strozier; Riley Jr.	4:17
4.	"Deep Inside Your Love"	Strozier; Riley Jr.; Potts; John Eaton	4:22

Side two
No.	Title	Writer(s)	Length
5.	"Oh Sheila"	Strozier; Riley Jr.; Gerald Valentine	4:00
6.	"Human Toy"	Riley Jr.	4:32
7.	"Slide Over"	Strozier; Riley Jr.; Potts; Valentine	5:03
8.	"Out of Town Lover"	Strozier; Riley Jr.	5:02
9.	"I'm the One Who Loves You"	Strozier; Riley Jr.; Potts	4:32
Total length:			42:44

== Personnel ==
Credits adapted from Discogs.

=== Performance credits ===
- Melvin Riley Jr. – lead vocals, guitar
- Gordon Strozier – guitar, backing vocals
- Gregory Potts – keyboards, backing vocals
- John Eaton – bass, backing vocals
- Gerald Valentine – drums, electronic drums
- Willie Triplett – electronic drums, backing vocals

=== Production ===
- Ready for the World – production
- Bernard Terry – production assistant, engineering (tracks 1, 4, 9)
- Louil Silas Jr. – engineering, remixing (tracks 2, 3, 5–8)
- Greg Reiley – engineering (tracks 1, 4, 9)
- Taavi Mote – remix engineering (tracks 2, 3, 5–8)
- Dan Marnien – remix engineering assistant – (tracks 2, 3, 5–8)
- Jim Shea – photography
- Vartan – art direction
- John Kosh – art direction, design
- Ron Larson – art direction, design
- Steve Hall – mastering

== Charts ==
=== Weekly charts ===
Chart performance for Ready for the World
Chart (1985)	Peak position
US Billboard 200	17
US Top R&B/Hip-Hop Albums (Billboard)	3

=== Year-end charts ===
Year-end chart performance for Ready for the World
Chart (1985)	Position
US Top R&B/Hip-Hop Albums (Billboard)	23
Chart (1986)	Position
US Billboard 200	74
US Top R&B/Hip-Hop Albums (Billboard)	27
