= Neva Eva =

2003 single by Trillville featuring Lil Scrappy and Lil Jon

Single by Trillville featuring Lil Scrappy and Lil Jon

from the album The King of Crunk & BME Recordings Present: Trillville & Lil Scrappy
- Released: November 4, 2003
- Recorded: 2003
- Genre: Hip hop, crunk
- Length: 4:35
- Label: Reprise; Warner Bros.; Black Market
- Songwriters: Lawrence Alfonso Edwards, Donnell Prince, Jamal Deandre Glaze, Lil Scrappy
- Producers: Don P; Lil Jon

"Neva Eva" is the first single from Trillville's debut album The King of Crunk & BME Recordings Present: Trillville & Lil Scrappy. The song features Lil Scrappy and Lil Jon. The single was released on November 4, 2003 through Warner Bros. Records, Reprise Records, and Lil Jon's Black Market Entertainment Recordings.

== Charts ==
=== Weekly charts ===
Chart (2003–2004)	Peak position
US Billboard Hot 100	77
US Hot R&B/Hip-Hop Songs (Billboard)	28
US Hot Rap Songs (Billboard)	22

=== Year-end charts ===
Chart (2004)	Position
US Hot R&B/Hip-Hop Songs (Billboard)	89
