= Bred 2 Die, Born 2 Live =

Bred 2 Die · Born 2 Live

Studio album by Lil Scrappy
- Released: December 5, 2006
- Recorded: 2005–2006
- Studios: The Vault (Miami, Florida); Tree Sound Studios (Duluth, Georgia); Hot Beats Studio (Atlanta, Georgia); S-Line Recording (Atlanta); Stankonia Recording (Atlanta); Bangladesh Studios (Atlanta); Aphilliates Studios (Atlanta); Drum Squad Studios (Atlanta); Jumpstart Productions (Brisbane, Australia); Hypnotize Minds Studios (Memphis, Tennessee); The Record Plant (Hollywood, California); The Studio at The Sunset Marquis (Hollywood); The Big House (Farmington Hills, Connecticut); 54 Sound (Detroit, Michigan); McCoy Street Studio (Atlanta); Battery Studios (New York City)
- Genre: Southern hip-hop
- Length: 76:08
- Labels: G'$ Up; G-Unit; BME; Reprise
- Producers: Bangladesh; DJ Paul; Don Cannon; Drumma Boy; Eminem; Ike Dirty; Jake One; Jazze Pha; J. R. Rotem; Juicy J; Kadis; Ky Miller; Lil Jon; Sean Marshall; Sha Money XL

Lil Scrappy chronology
The King of Crunk & BME Recordings Present: Trillville & Lil Scrappy (2004)	Bred 2 Die · Born 2 Live (2006)	Prince of the South (2008)

Singles from Bred 2 Die · Born 2 Live
- 1. "Money in the Bank" Released: March 28, 2006; 2. "Gangsta Gangsta" Released: May 27, 2006; 3. "Oh Yeah (Work)" Released: January 31, 2007; 4. "Livin in the Projects" Released: 2007

Professional ratings
Review scores
Source	Rating
AllHipHop	3/5 stars
AllMusic	3/5 stars
HipHopDX	2.5/5
RapReviews	6.5/10

Bred 2 Die, Born 2 Live (stylized as Bred 2 Die · Born 2 Live) is the debut solo studio album by American rapper Lil Scrappy. It was released on December 5, 2006, through G'$ Up Entertainment, G-Unit Records, BME Recordings, and Reprise Records.

Recording sessions took place at The Vault in Miami, at Tree Sound Studios in Duluth, at Hot Beats Studio, S-Line Recording, Stankonia Recording, Bangladesh Studios, Aphilliates Studios and Drum Squad Studios in Atlanta, at Jumpstart Productions in Brisbane, at Hypnotize Minds Studios in Memphis, at the Record Plant and the Studio at the Sunset Marquis in Hollywood, at The Big House in Farmington Hills and at 54 Sound in Detroit, with additional recording at McCoy Street Studio in Atlanta and Battery Studios in New York.

Production was handled by Lil Jon, Bangladesh, DJ Paul, Don Cannon, Drumma Boy, Eminem, Ike Dirty, Jake One, Jazze Pha, J. R. Rotem, Juicy J, Kadis, Ky Miller, Sean Marshall and Sha Money XL.

It features guest appearances from Bo Hagon, 50 Cent, Lil' Chris, Lil Jon, Lloyd, Nook, Olivia, Playboy Tre', StayFresh, Three 6 Mafia, Yo Gotti, Young Buck, Young Dro, Yung Joc, E-40 and Sean P.

The album debuted at number 24 on the Billboard 200, number 5 on the Top R&B/Hip-Hop Albums and number 3 on the Top Rap Albums charts, with first-week sales of 82,000 copies in the United States. Its lead single, "Money in the Bank", made it to number 28 on the Billboard Hot 100, number 7 on the Hot R&B/Hip-Hop Songs, number 5 on the Hot Rap Songs, received gold certification by the Recording Industry Association of America, and was included in the video game WWE SmackDown vs. Raw 2007.

== Track listing ==
No.	Title	Writer(s)	Producer(s)	Length
1.	"I'm Back"	Darryl Richardson II; Jonathan Smith; LaMarquis Jefferson; Craig Love	Lil Jon	2:57
2.	"Touching Everything" (featuring Yung Joc)	Richardson II; Jasiel Robinson; Phalon Alexander; Zachary Wallace	Jazze Pha	4:49
3.	"Young and Famous" (featuring Stayfresh)			1:12
4.	"Money in the Bank (Remix)" (featuring Young Buck)	Richardson II; Isaac Hayes III	Ike Dirty	3:53
5.	"Been a Boss" (featuring Young Dro and Bohagon)	Richardson II; D'Juan Hart; Cedric Leonard; Smith; John Jackson; Jay Jenkins; Sharif Slater	Lil Jon	4:51
6.	"Gangsta, Gangsta" (featuring Lil Jon)	Richardson II; Smith; Love; Jefferson; William Holmes	Lil Jon	4:21
7.	"Posted in the Club" (featuring Three 6 Mafia)	Richardson II; Paul Beauregard; Jordan Houston	DJ Paul; Juicy J	3:49
8.	"Anutha Country Story" (featuring Bohagon and Playboy Tre')			1:24
9.	"Livin' in the Projects"	Richardson II; Jonathan Rotem; Brad Jordan; Tupac Shakur; Michael Dean; James Harris III; Terry Lewis	J. R. Rotem	4:14
10.	"Born to Live"	Richardson II; Smith; Love	Lil' Jon	5:02
11.	"Pussy Poppin'" (featuring Lloyd)	Richardson II; Lloyd Polite; Shondrae Crawford	Bangladesh	3:50
12.	"Get Right" (featuring Yo Gotti and Lil Chris)	Richardson II; Mario Mims; Christopher Bell; Donald Cannon; Kenneth Johnson; Jerry Ritchey	Don Cannon	3:58
13.	"Baby Daddy"	Richardson II; Michael Clervoix; Kyeme Miller; Curtis Mayfield	Sha Money XL; Ky Miller	4:38
14.	"The Situation" (featuring Nook)			1:51
15.	"Police"	Richardson II; Smith	Lil Jon	4:31
16.	"Like Me"	Richardson II; Christopher Gholson; Robert Brooks; Don Robey	Drumma Boy	3:58
17.	"G-Shit" (featuring Olivia)	Richardson II; Olivia Longott; Gary Spriggs; Sean Marshall; C. Williams	Kadis & Sean	2:38
18.	"Nigga, What's Up" (featuring 50 Cent)	Richardson II; Curtis Jackson; Jacob Dutton	Jake One	3:16
19.	"Lord Have Mercy"	Richardson II; Marshall Mathers; Steve King; Luis Resto; Jeff Bass	Eminem	3:48
20.	"Oh Yeah (Work)" (featuring Sean P. and E-40)	Richardson II; Sean Paul Joseph; Earl Stevens; Smith; Holmes	Lil Jon	7:08
Total length:				1:16:08

Bred 2 Die, Born 2 Live — iTunes Store bonus tracks
No.	Title	Writer(s)	Producer(s)	Length
21.	"Shake It"	Richardson II	J. R. Rotem	2:45

Bred 2 Die, Born 2 Live — Best Buy bonus tracks
No.	Title	Writer(s)	Producer(s)	Length
21.	"Every Ghetto" (featuring Rell)	Richardson II; Gerrell Gaddis; Alan Maman	The Alchemist	4:33

Sample credits

- Track 5 contains elements of "Do the Damn Thing" written by John Jackson, Jay Jenkins and Sharif Slater and performed by Fabolous and Young Jeezy.
- Track 9 contains samples of "Smile" written by Brad Jordan, Tupac Shakur, Michael Dean, James Harris III and Terry Lewis and performed by Scarface.
- Track 12 contains elements of "Narrow People" written by Kenneth Johnson and Jerry Ritchey and performed by California Poppy Pickers.
- Track 13 contains elements of "Just Be True" written by Curtis Mayfield and performed by David Porter.
- Track 16 contains interpolations of "Lead Me On" written by Don Robey.

== Personnel ==
- Darryl "Lil Scrappy" Richardson II – vocals
- Jasiel "Yung Joc" Robinson – vocals (track 2)
- Stay Fresh – vocals (track 3)
- David "Young Buck" Brown – vocals (track 4)
- D'Juan "Young Dro" Hart – vocals (track 5)
- Cedric "Bohagon" Leonard – vocals (tracks: 5, 8)
- Jonathan "Lil Jon" Smith – vocals (track 6), drum programming (tracks: 1, 5, 6, 10, 15), keyboards (track 1), producer (tracks: 1, 5, 6, 10, 15, 20), mixing (tracks: 1, 4–6, 10, 15), executive producer
- Paul "DJ Paul" Beauregard – vocals, producer & recording (track 7)
- Jordan "Juicy J" Houston – vocals, producer & recording (track 7)
- Playboy Tré – vocals (track 8)
- Lloyd Polite – vocals (track 11)
- Mario "Yo Gotti" Mims – vocals (track 12)
- Christopher "Lil Chris" Bell – vocals (track 12)
- Nook – vocals (track 14)
- Olivia Longott – vocals (track 17)
- Curtis "50 Cent" Jackson – vocals (track 18), executive producer
- Sean Paul Joseph – vocals (track 20)
- Earl "E-40" Stevens – vocals (track 20)
- Craig Love – guitar (tracks: 1, 6, 10)
- Lamarquis Jefferson – bass (tracks: 1, 6, 10)
- Detroit Nix – keyboards (track 10)
- Shondrae "Bangladesh" Crawford – keyboards, producer & recording (track 11)
- Justin Ellington – keyboards (track 11)
- Luis Resto – keyboards (track 19)
- Jeff Bass – keyboards (track 19)
- Steve King – bass guitar (track 19)
- Phalon "Jazze Pha" Alexander – producer (track 2)
- Isaac "Ike Dirty" Hayes III – producer & recording (track 4)
- Jonathan "J. R." Rotem – producer (track 9)
- Don Cannon – producer & recording (track 12)
- Michael "Sha Money XL" Clervoix – producer (track 13)
- Kyeme "Ky" Miller – producer (track 13), recording (tracks: 13, 17–19)
- Christopher "Drumma Boy" Gholson – producer & recording (track 16)
- Gary "Kadis" Spriggs – producer (track 17)
- Sean Marshall – producer (track 17)
- Jacob "Jake One" Dutton – producer (track 18)
- Marshall "Eminem" Mathers – producer (track 19)
- Mark Vinten – recording (tracks: 1, 5, 6)
- Nico Solis – recording (track 2)
- Mickey Lewis – recording (track 4)
- Chris Carmouche – recording (tracks: 5, 10, 11)
- Malik Albert – recording (tracks: 5, 16)
- Mike Hogue – recording (tracks: 9, 12), mixing (track 9)
- Jason Fleming – recording (track 12)
- Mike Strange – recording (track 19)
- John Frye – mixing (tracks: 1, 4–7, 10–12, 15)
- Leslie Brathwaite – mixing (tracks: 2, 16, 19)
- Pat Viala – mixing (tracks: 13, 17)
- Steve Baughman – mixing (track 18)
- Dana "Dee Jay Dana" Ramey – additional recording (track 2)
- Thomas "Tom Cat" Bennett – additional recording (track 2)
- Rich Tapper – additional recording (track 6), recording assistant (track 10)
- Keith Sengbusch – additional recording assistant (track 6), recording assistant (track 10)
- Warren Bletcher – recording assistant (tracks: 10, 11)
- Gary Fly – mixing assistant (tracks: 1, 4–7, 10–12, 15)
- Tom Coyne – mastering
- Robert "R.O.B." McDowell – executive producer
- Dwayne "Emperor" Searcy – executive producer
- Kevin "Coach K" Lee – executive producer
- Vince "VP" Phillips – executive producer
- Rawle Stewart – executive producer
- Tom Whalley – executive producer
- Anthony Mandler – photography
- Darrell Steven "Chris" Lighty – management

== Charts ==
=== Weekly charts ===
Chart (2006)	Peak position
US Billboard 200	24
US Top R&B/Hip-Hop Albums (Billboard)	5
US Top Rap Albums (Billboard)	3

=== Year-end charts ===
Chart (2007)	Position
US Billboard 200	197
US Top R&B/Hip-Hop Albums (Billboard)	61
