= Isaac Hayes III =

American record producer, songwriter, and voice actor

- Also known as: Ike Dirty
- Born: Isaac Lee Hayes III; June 10, 1975 (age 51)
- Origin: Atlanta, Georgia, U.S.
- Genres: Hip hop, R&B, pop
- Occupations: Record producer, songwriter, voice actor, entrepreneur
- Years active: 1997–present
- Labels: Chartcontrol, Dirtynthebeest
- Website: Twitter.com/isaachayes3

Isaac Lee Hayes III (born June 10, 1975) is an American tech entrepreneur, investor, record producer, songwriter, and Founder and CEO of Fanbase, a social media platform built around creator monetization. He also serves as manager of the estate of his father, musician Isaac Hayes.

== Career ==
Hayes operates a production company called Chartcontrol and a publishing company called IKE Father IKE Son Music. He is known for producing the Lil Scrappy song "Money in the Bank" and the Ying Yang Twins song "Drop." He has also produced tracks for Redman, Keith Murray, Too Short, Blaque, Ruff Ryders, Black Coffey, Kurupt, Chris Robinson ("ATL" score), Jamie Foxx's Laffapalooza Comedy Central Special & DVD, Bohagon, Chamillionaire, Keke Palmer, Flash Freddy, Raz-B (former B2K band member), and J.R. on Universal Records/Grand Hustle.

Hayes has performed voice-over work for various companies such as the Atlanta Hawks, the Georgia Lottery, McDonald's, Publix, American Airlines, and Cadillac. He also voiced the disembodied voice in the episode "Broodwich" in the second season of Aqua Teen Hunger Force.

Hayes is the president of Isaac Hayes Enterprises, a company that manages his father's music and legacy. In 2019, Hayes founded the content sharing app Fanbase through crowdsourced donations, to give Black content creators a means to monetize their content.
