= Here I Go Again (Mario song) =

2005 single by Mario

Single by Mario

from the album Turning Point
- Released: June 20, 2005
- Genre: R&B; pop rock
- Length: 3:21
- Label: J
- Songwriters: Theron Feemster; Aaron Sledge; Bryan Sledge; Reginald Lewis
- Producer: Theron Feemster

Mario singles chronology
"How Could You" (2005)	"Here I Go Again" (2005)	"Boom" (2005)

Music video
- "Here I Go Again" on YouTube

"Here I Go Again" is a song by American singer Mario. It was written by Aaron Sledge, Bryan Sledge, Reginald Lewis, and Theron "Neff-U" Feemster for his second studio album, Turning Point (2004), while production was helmed by the latter. The song was released as the album's third single in June 2005. It debuted and peaked at number 11 on the UK Singles Chart and also reached the top 20 in Australia and Ireland. The official remix of "Here I Go Again" was produced by Hugh Atkins, Karl Atkins, and Pete Trotman from Blacksmith, while another remix was produced by Mauve.

== Critical reception ==
From Contactmusic.com, there are two different reviews. Editor Candice Finney found that "this track is so funky and so much better than his first outing with "Let me love you" [...] What I love about this song is that it kicks ass, its pure R&B and he's certainly a superstar when it comes to writing about his feelings." The other is from JAZZILY, who rated the single three out of five stars, saying "'Here I Go Again' dynamic co-mingling of R&B with the edginess of pop rock, largely thanks to the sample from "Grease". Mario's voice beautifully overpowers the songs subtle, yet harsh guitar sound making it an exciting diverse sound".

== Commercial performance ==
Released as the second international single from Turning Point, "Here I Go Again" became a top ten hit on the Dutch Top 40, peaking at number ten. In the United Kingdom, the song debuted and peaked at number 11 on the UK Singles Chart. It also peaked at number four on the UK R&B Singles chart. Elsewhere, "Here I Go Again" reached the top 20 in Australia, Ireland, and Scotland.

== Music video ==
A music video for "Here I Go Again" was directed by Ray Kay. Choreographed by YA Boy Flash, the visuals co-star R&B singer Cassie. The video premiered on MTV in the week of April 7, 2005. In the clip, Mario alternately confronts and romances a sexy woman. The couple's tumultuous relationship plays out in such locations as the streets of New York City, on a rooftop, in a taxi and on a watery stage in front of a truck. Also included are a few choreographed dance set-ups.

== Track listings ==
Australian CD single

1. "Here I Go Again"
2. "Here I Go Again" (Blacksmith Rerub with rap)
3. "Here I Go Again" (Blacksmith Rerub without rap)
4. "Here I Go Again" (Mauve mix)
5. "Let Me Love You" (Mauve mix)

European CD single

1. "Here I Go Again" – 3:21
2. "Here I Go Again" (Mauve vocal) – 7:47

European maxi-CD single

1. "Here I Go Again" (album version)
2. "Here I Go Again" (AOL live version)
3. "Here I Go Again" (Mauve remix)
4. "Here I Go Again" (video)

UK CD single

1. "Here I Go Again" (original version)
2. "Here I Go Again" (Blacksmith Rerub featuring the Bosses Players edit)

UK 12-inch single

A1. "Here I Go Again" (Blacksmith Rerub featuring the Bosses Players)
A2. "Here I Go Again" (Blacksmith instrumental)
A3. "Here I Go Again" (original version)
B1. "Here I Go Again" (Mauve remix)
B2. "Here I Go Again" (Mauve remix dub)

== Credits and personnel ==
Credits are lifted from the liner notes of Turning Point.

- Theron Feemster – production, writing
- Bob Horn – bass, guitar, recording engineer
- Manny Marroquin – mixing engineer
- Aaron Sledge – writing
- Bryan Sledge – writing
- Reginald Lewis – writing

== Charts ==
=== Weekly charts ===
Weekly chart performance for "Here I Go Again"
Chart (2005)	Peak position
Australia (ARIA)	15
Australian Urban (ARIA)	8
Belgium (Ultratop 50 Flanders)	43
Belgium (Ultratip Bubbling Under Wallonia)	5
Europe (Eurochart Hot 100)	29
Germany (GfK)	50
Hungary (Rádiós Top 40)	28
Ireland (IRMA)	16
Italy (FIMI)	50
Netherlands (Dutch Top 40 Tipparade)	10
Netherlands (Single Top 100)	40
New Zealand (Recorded Music NZ)	36
Scotland Singles (Official Charts)	13
Sweden (Sverigetopplistan)	49
Switzerland (Schweizer Hitparade)	34
UK Singles (Official Charts)	11
UK Hip Hop/R&B (Official Charts)	4

=== Year-end charts ===
Year-end chart performance for "Here I Go Again"
Chart (2005)	Position
UK Urban (Music Week)	36

== Release history ==
Release history and formats for "Here I Go Again"
Region	Date	Format	Label	Ref.
Australia	June 20, 2005	Digital download EP	J	
Canada	June 20, 2005	Digital download EP	J	
United States	June 20, 2005	Digital download EP	J	
United Kingdom	June 27, 2005	Digital download	J	
United Kingdom	June 27, 2005	CD	J	
Australia	July 11, 2005	CD	J	
