= Ruff 'n' Ready =

Ruff 'N' Ready

Studio album by Ready for the World
- Released: September 19, 1988
- Recorded: 1987–1988
- Genre: R&B
- Length: 56:43
- Label: MCA

Ready for the World chronology
Long Time Coming (1986)	Ruff 'N' Ready (1988)	Straight Down to Business (1991)

Ruff N' Ready is the third album by the American musical group Ready for the World. It was released on September 19, 1988, via MCA Records.

== Critical reception ==
Professional ratings
Review scores
Source	Rating
AllMusic	2/5 stars
Orlando Sentinel	3/5 stars

The Orlando Sentinel wrote that "Melvin Riley Jr.'s dead-straight delivery makes the less-than-stellar material emotionally effective—maybe not enough to take over the charts, but it will dominate a few bedroom playlists." The Advocate noted that "the instrumentation is sparse, but the drums and drum machines pound out the beat to some quirky melody riffs."

== Track listing ==
1. "My Girly" 5:31
2. "Shame" 5:00
3. "Cowboy" 4:31
4. "Gently" 5:29
5. "Money" 5:22
6. "Darlin' Darlin" 4:36
7. "Don't You Wanna (With Me)" 4:29
8. "Late Saturday Night" 4:34
9. "It's Funny" 4:41
10. "It's All Up to You" 4:32
11. "My Girly (Extended Version)" 7:48

== Charts ==
Chart (1988)	Peak position
Billboard Top LPs	65 (1988)
Billboard Top Black Albums	17
