= Zentveld & Oomen =

Dutch musical group; DJ duo

- Origin: Netherlands
- Genres: Dance, trance
- Years active: 2002–present
- Labels: Boss Records, Data Records
- Past members: Hugo Zentveld; Aldwin Oomen; Lara McAllen (2002-2005, 2007-2024)
- Website: Angel City official Myspace

Zentveld & Oomen is a Dutch DJ duo consisting of Hugo Zentveld (a.k.a. DJ Renegade) and Aldwin Oomen, who are behind a number of dance production projects, including Angel City, Boombastic, and Nightbreed.

== Angel City ==
Angel City is a dance project by Zentveld and Oomen, led by British recording artist Lara McAllen. The majority of their songs are dance covers. The group were signed to Ministry of Sound record labels Boss Records and Data Records. Their hit "Do You Know (I Go Crazy)" sampled the instrumental track "Children" by Robert Miles, as well as the lyrics from "Do You Know" by Michelle Gayle. It was their biggest hit, peaking at number eight on the UK Singles Chart. Their hit "Touch Me" sampled the lyrics from Cathy Dennis' hit, "Touch Me (All Night Long)". Their fourth song, "Sunrise", was a cover of a track of the same name by Ashiva, and was a Top 10 hit in the UK and across Europe in February 2005. One of the co-writers of this tune, S. Shawcross also co-wrote "City Lights" (which featured on the Angel City album) and has since become an artist in her own right, performing under the name Sarah Lucie Shaw. McAllen left the group in 2005 to pursue a solo career. However, she re-joined Angel City in late 2006, and featured in the band's 2007 single, "24/7". In July 2010, a promo clip of a new song called "How Do You Sleep" was posted on Dance Nation's website.

== Discography ==
=== Studio albums ===
- Love Me Right (2005) #44 UK

=== Singles ===
Year	Single	Peak chart positions								Album
Year	Single	BEL (Vl)	AUS	NED	UK	UK Dance	TUR	U.S.	U.S. Dance	Album
2003	"Love Me Right (Oh Sheila)"	27	70	62	11	1	1	95	1	Love Me Right
2004	"Touch Me (All Night Long)"	55	—	44	18	2	10	—	—	Love Me Right
2004	"Do You Know (I Go Crazy)"	36	—	54	8	1	22	—	47	Love Me Right
2005	"Sunrise"	—	—	—	9	9	20	—	1	Love Me Right
"—" denotes releases that did not chart
