= How Could You (Mario song) =

2005 single by Mario

Single by Mario

from the album Turning Point
- Released: February 14, 2005
- Genre: R&B
- Length: 3:56
- Label: 3rd Street; J
- Songwriters: Antonio Dixon; Durrell Babbs; Damon Thomas; Eric Dawkins; Harvey Mason, Jr.; J. Valentine
- Producers: The Underdogs; Tank

Mario singles chronology
"Let Me Love You" (2004)	"How Could You" (2005)	"Here I Go Again" (2005)

Music video
- "How Could You" on YouTube

"How Could You" is a song by American singer Mario. It was written by Antonio Dixon, Eric Dawkins, J. Valentine, Damon Thomas and Harvey Mason, Jr. for his second studio album Turning Point (2004), while production was helmed by Thomas and Mason under their production moniker The Underdogs. Released on February 14, 2005 as the album's second US single, the song reached number 52 on the Billboard Hot 100. In Australia, where "How Could You" was issued as the third single from Turning Point, it debuted at number 43 on the Australian Singles Chart.

== Chart performance ==
"How Could You" debuted at number 93 on the Billboard Hot 100 for the week of March 19, 2005, while "Let Me Love You" was number three on that chart. Eight weeks later, it peaked at number 52 the week of May 14, remaining on the chart for seventeen weeks.

== Music video ==
A music video for "How Could You" was directed by Benny Boom. It features appearances from rapper Cassidy, JD Williams, and actress Ambrosia Williams.

== Track listing ==
Australian CD single
No.	Title	Writer(s)	Producer(s)	Length
1.	"How Could You" (dirty version)	Antonio Dixon; Damon Thomas; Eric Dawkins; Harvey Mason, Jr.; J. Valentine	The Underdogs	3:57
2.	"How Could You" (Scott Storch remix club version)	Scott Storch; Kameron Houff; Shaffer Smith	Scott Storch^{[a]}	4:45
3.	"Couldn't Say No"	Mario Barrett; Ron "Neff-U" Feemster; Sean Garrett	Feemster; Garrett^{[b]}	3:53
4.	"How Could You" (music video)			4:45

Notes

- ^{^[a]} signifies a remix producer
- ^{^[b]} signifies a vocal producer

== Charts ==
=== Weekly charts ===
Weekly chart performance for "How Could You"
Chart (2005)	Peak position
Australia (ARIA)	43
Australian Urban (ARIA)	16
Netherlands (Urban Top 100)	42
US Billboard Hot 100	52
US Hot R&B/Hip-Hop Songs (Billboard)	14
US Pop 100 (Billboard)	72
US Rhythmic Airplay (Billboard)	15

=== Year-end charts ===
Year-end chart performance for "How Could You"
Chart (2005)	Position
US Hot R&B/Hip-Hop Songs (Billboard)	65

== Release history ==
Release history and formats for "How Could You"
Region	Date	Format(s)	Label(s)	Ref.
United States	February 14, 2005	Rhythmic contemporary; urban radio	3rd Street; J	
United States	March 14, 2005	Contemporary hit radio	3rd Street; J	
Australia	October 24, 2005	CD	3rd Street; J	
