= Oh Sheila =

1985 single by Ready for the World

- US and other territories picture sleeve

Single by Ready for the World

from the album Ready for the World
- B-side: "I'm the One Who Loves You"
- Released: 1985
- Genre: Synth-funk; electropop
- Length: 4:00 (album version); 3:36 (single version)
- Label: MCA
- Songwriters: Melvin Riley Jr.; Gordon Strozier; Gerald Valentine
- Producer: Ready for the World

Ready for the World singles chronology
"Deep Inside Your Love" (1985)	"Oh Sheila" (1985)	"Digital Display" (1985)

Music video
- "Oh Sheila” on YouTube

"Oh Sheila" is a song by American R&B band Ready for the World. Released as a single in 1985, it reached number one on the US Billboard Hot 100, the Billboard Hot Black Singles chart, and the Billboard Hot Dance/Disco Club Play chart. It was the first of two chart toppers for the band on the Billboard R&B chart, preceding their 1986 number-one R&B hit "Love You Down".

The song is commonly misattributed to Prince, due to the similarities to his vocal and musical style, heavy use of the detuned rimshot in courtesy of a Linndrum, and the belief that the song's lyrics allude to frequent Prince collaborator Sheila E.

The use of a faux British accent during parts of the song was the preference of singer Melvin Riley Jr., who said "I like that kind of accent, so I thought I'd use that sound."

== Track listings ==
7-inch vinyl version

1. "Oh Sheila" (single version) – 3:36
2. "I'm the One Who Loves You" – 3:20

12-inch vinyl version

1. "Oh Sheila" (extended version) – 6:48
2. "Oh Sheila" (Dubstramental) – 4:00
3. "Oh Sheila" (a cappella)" – 3:54

== Charts ==
=== Weekly charts ===
Chart (1985)	Peak position
Australia (Kent Music Report)	14
Belgium (Ultratop 50 Flanders)	9
Canada Top Singles (RPM)	1
Ireland (IRMA)	18
Netherlands (Dutch Top 40)	24
Netherlands (Single Top 100)	16
New Zealand (Recorded Music NZ)	24
Switzerland (Schweizer Hitparade)	13
UK Singles (Official Charts)	50
US Billboard Hot 100	1
US 12-inch Singles Sales (Billboard)	6
US Hot Black Singles (Billboard)	1
US Hot Dance/Disco Club Play (Billboard)	1
US Cash Box	3
West Germany (GfK)	11

=== Year-end charts ===
Chart (1985)	Position
Canada Top Singles (RPM)	27
US Billboard Hot 100	31
US Cash Box	40

== Angel City version ==
"Love Me Right (Oh Sheila)"

Single by Angel City featuring Lara McAllen

from the album Love Me Right
- Released: 1999
- Genre: Eurodance
- Length: 3:13
- Label: Data
- Songwriters: Melvin Riley Jr.; Gordon Strozier; Gerald Valentine

Angel City featuring Lara McAllen singles chronology
"Love Me Right (Oh Sheila)" (1999; 2003)	"Touch Me" (2004)

In 1999, Dutch dance duo Angel City covered the song, featuring vocals by British singer Lara McAllen. The song was first released in 1999 and again in 2003. It is the lead single from the band's 2005 debut album, Love Me Right. Angel City's version retains the verses from the original song but changes the chorus.

"Love Me Right (Oh Sheila)" reached number 11 on the UK Singles Chart and number 95 on the U.S. Billboard Hot 100, becoming their first charting single in the latter. The single also charted in Belgium and the Netherlands.

=== Charts ===
==== Weekly charts ====
Chart (1999)	Peak position
Belgium (Ultratop 50 Flanders)	27

Chart (2003–2004)	Peak position
Australia (ARIA)	70
Belgium (Ultratip Bubbling Under Wallonia)	12
Hungary (Dance Top 40)	35
Hungary (Editors' Choice Top 40)	35
Netherlands (Single Top 100)	62
Scottish Singles Sales (Official Charts)	10
UK Singles (Official Charts)	11
UK Dance (Official Charts)	7
US Billboard Hot 100	95
US Dance Radio Airplay (Billboard)	1

==== Year-end charts ====
Chart (2003)	Position
UK Singles (OCC)	174

Chart (2004)	Position
US Dance Radio Airplay (Billboard)	9

== See also ==
- List of Billboard Hot 100 number-one singles of 1985
- List of number-one dance singles of 1985 (U.S.)
- List of number-one R&B singles of 1985 (U.S.)
- List of number-one singles of 1985 (Canada)
- List of number-one dance airplay hits of 2004 (U.S.)
