= Money in the Bank (Lil Scrappy song) =

Single by Lil Scrappy featuring Young Buck

from the album Bred 2 Die • Born 2 Live
- Released: March 28, 2006
- Recorded: 2005
- Genre: Crunk; snap
- Length: 4:53
- Label: G-Unit South; BME; Reprise; Warner; Asylum
- Songwriters: Darryl Richardson; Curtis Jackson; Brian Elliott Smith; David Brown
- Producer: Isaac Hayes III

Lil Scrappy singles chronology
"I'm a King" (2005)	"Money in the Bank" (2006)	"Gangsta, Gangsta" (2006)

"Money in the Bank" is a hip hop single from Lil Scrappy's debut album Bred 2 Die • Born 2 Live, featuring Young Buck. The video has cameo appearances including Lil Jon, Lloyd Banks, Chamillionaire, Project Pat, Spider Loc, T-Pain, David Banner, Nick Cannon, All Star Cashville Prince, Diamond, Princess of Crime Mob, Young Hot Rod, Katt Williams and Ike Dirty.

== Background ==
Originally appeared on Young Buck's Mixtape, Case Dismissed!

XXL, as well as other media outlets, have mistakenly credited Lil' Jon as the producer of this song, most likely because he appears in the video and the beat sounds like a typical Lil' Jon beat. Also the beat is similar to a slower version of Lil' Jon's "Get Low."

MTV/MTV2 has aired a Making the Video episode for this single.

The single version of the song features the famous "I'm rich bitch!" quote from Dave Chappelle in the intro and outro. This is not heard on the album version and the music video.

In 2009 R&B singer Amerie recorded the 'answer back' version. This version was released via her mixtape "Because I Love It - Volume 1". The answer back was later merged with the original to create a remix.

The song is featured in the game soundtrack for the wrestling video game WWE SmackDown vs. Raw 2007, in conjunction to the Money in the Bank ladder match featured in the game. It had been rumored that WWE would use the song as the official theme for their Money in the Bank Pay-Per-View in July 2010, but it has been confirmed that the theme used was "Money" by I Fight Dragons.

== Track listing ==
U.S. EP

1. "Money in the Bank (radio edit)"
2. "Money in the Bank (album version)"
3. "Money in the Bank (instrumental)"

== Charts ==
=== Weekly charts ===
Chart (2006)	Peak position
US Billboard Hot 100	28
US Hot R&B/Hip-Hop Songs (Billboard)	7
US Hot Rap Songs (Billboard)	5
US Rhythmic Airplay (Billboard)	17

=== Year-end charts ===
Chart (2006)	Position
US Hot R&B/Hip-Hop Songs (Billboard)	85
Chart (2007)	Position
US Hot R&B/Hip-Hop Songs (Billboard)	84
