= Oh Yeah (Work) =

Single by Lil Scrappy featuring Sean Paul of the YoungBloodZ and E-40

from the album Bred 2 Die • Born 2 Live
- Released: December 5, 2006
- Genre: Crunk
- Label: BME, G-Unit, Reprise, Warner Bros., Asylum
- Songwriters: William Andrew Holmes, Sean Paul Joseph, Lil Scrappy, Lil Jon, E-40
- Producer: Lil Jon

Lil Scrappy singles chronology
"Gangsta Gangsta" (2006)	"Oh Yeah (Work)" (2006)	"Livin' in the Projects" (2007)

E-40 singles chronology
"U and Dat" (2006)	"Oh Yeah (Work)" (2006)	"Candy (Drippin' Like Water)" (2006)

"Oh Yeah (Work)" is the third single from American rapper Lil Scrappy's second album Bred 2 Die Born 2 Live. The song's beat structure incorporates typical southern hip hop snares as well as Lil Jon's signature crunk synths. Although on the release of the album, the single was an unlisted track. It features E-40 and Sean P of the YoungBloodZ.

== Music video ==
The music video for the song was directed by Marcus Raboy and premiered as a New Joint on BET's 106 & Park Live, on February 15, 2007.

J-Bo of the Youngbloodz, Lil Jon, and Too Short made cameo appearances in the video. It is produced by Lil Jon. Part of the hook is influenced by Lloyd Banks' song "Work Magic".

== Charts ==
Chart (2007)	Peak position
US Bubbling Under Hot 100 (Billboard)	13
US Hot R&B/Hip-Hop Songs (Billboard)	60
US Hot Rap Songs (Billboard)	20
US Rhythmic Airplay (Billboard)	39

== Release history ==
Region	Date	Format(s)	Label(s)	Ref.
United States	February 5, 2007	Urban contemporary radio	BME, Reprise	
