= The King of Crunk & BME Recordings Present: Trillville & Lil Scrappy =

Studio album by Trillville and Lil Scrappy
- Released: February 24, 2004
- Recorded: 2003
- Genre: Hip hop, Southern hip hop, crunk
- Label: BME; Reprise; Warner Bros.
- Producer: Lil Jon, Don P, BING-O

Lil Scrappy chronology
| The King of Crunk & BME Present: Trillville & Lil Scrappy (2004) | Bred 2 Die Born 2 Live (2006) |

Professional ratings
Review scores
| Source | Rating |
|---|---|
| AllMusic | 3/5 stars |

The King of Crunk & BME Recordings Present: Trillville & Lil Scrappy is a collaborative and split studio album between BME artists Trillville and Lil Scrappy released by BME Recordings, Reprise Records and Warner Bros. Records on February 24, 2004. On copies with Trillville on the front cover, the Trillville side appears first and on copies with Lil Scrappy on the cover the Lil Scrappy side appears first.

The first single is "Neva Eva" By Trillville. It was recorded in 2003 and released in November of that year. It was released on CD and also has a music video. The second single is "Some Cut" By Trillville. It was released in 2004 and it has a music video. The third and final single is "No Problem" by Lil Scrappy. It was released in 2004 and has a music video.

== Commercial performance ==
The King of Crunk & BME Recordings Present: Trillville & Lil Scrappy debuted and peaked at number 12 on the Billboard 200, selling over an estimated 58,000 copies in its first week. The album has been certified Gold by the RIAA for selling over 700,000 copies in America.

== Track listing ==
Trillville side
| No. | Title | Producer(s) | Length |
|---|---|---|---|
| 1. | "Trillville Radio" | | 1:08 |
| 2. | "Neva Eva" (featuring Lil Jon & Lil Scrappy) | Lil Jon | 4:54 |
| 3. | "Get Some Crunk in Yo System" (featuring Pastor Troy) | Lil Jon | 4:34 |
| 4. | "Goodbye" | | 0:18 |
| 5. | "Weakest Link" | Lil Jon | 4:18 |
| 6. | "Bathroom" | | 0:18 |
| 7. | "Bitch Niggaz" (featuring Lil Scrappy) | Lil Jon | 4:24 |
| 8. | "Dookie Love" (featuring Buck Thrusthorne, Hotballs Johnson & Mr. Easy) | Lil Jon | 1:26 |
| 9. | "Some Cut" (featuring Cutty) | Lil Jon | 4:43 |
| 10. | "The Hood" (featuring Lil Jon) | Lil Jon | 4:11 |

Lil Scrappy side
| No. | Title | Producer(s) | Length |
|---|---|---|---|
| 1. | "Crank It" | Lil Jon | 1:28 |
| 2. | "What The Fuck" | Lil Jon | 5:02 |
| 3. | "Head Bussa" (featuring Lil Jon) | Lil Jon, Joe "Da Bingo" Bing | 3:55 |
| 4. | "Bootleg" (featuring Stayfresh) | | 0:52 |
| 5. | "No Problem" | Lil Jon | 3:34 |
| 6. | "Dookie Love Public Service Announcement" (featuring Buck Thrusthorne) | | 0:45 |
| 7. | "F.I.L.A." (Forever I Love Atlanta) (featuring Lil Jon) | Lil Jon | 5:04 |
| 8. | "Crunk Radio" | | 0:48 |
| 9. | "Diamonds In My Pinky Ring" (featuring Big Nod, Lil Chris, Grip & Kaskit) | Joe "Da Bingo" Bing | 4:13 |
| 10. | "Be Real" (featuring Bohagon) | Lil Jon | 5:02 |
| 11. | "Gone" (featuring Bohagon) | Lil Jon | 3:25 |

Notes Joe Bingo – Co-Produced (track 3), Producer (track 9) Lil Scrappy Side

== Charts ==
=== Weekly charts ===
| Chart (2004) | Peak position |
|---|---|
| US Billboard 200 | 12 |
| US Top R&B/Hip-Hop Albums (Billboard) | 3 |

=== Year-end charts ===
| Chart (2004) | Position |
|---|---|
| US Billboard 200 | 123 |
| US Top R&B/Hip-Hop Albums (Billboard) | 26 |
| Chart (2005) | Position |
| US Top R&B/Hip-Hop Albums (Billboard) | 86 |
