= Trillville =

American hip hop trio from Georgia

- Origin: Atlanta, Georgia, U.S.
- Genres: Hip hop; crunk; southern hip-hop
- Years active: 1997–present
- Labels: Warner; Warner Bros.; Reprise; Black Market
- Members: Don P Lil LA aka Lil Atlanta; Dirty Mouth

Trillville is an American hip hop group formed in 1997. Its founding members are Donnell Don P Prince, Dirty Mouth (born Jamal Glaze), and LA (formerly Lil LA and Lil Atlanta; born Lawrence Edwards). Dirty Mouth left the group in 2007 to pursue a solo career and returned in 2011.

== Biography ==
The three members of Trillville met as high school students in Atlanta. Glaze led the snare drums in the school's marching band, Don P wrote rhymes and produced beats on his keyboard, and Edwards was an aspiring promoter. They named their group "Trillville" combining the words "truth" and "real", with " Prince ", Glaze "Dirty Mouth", and Edwards "Lil Atlanta" (later "Lil LA" and "LA").

Lil Jon discovered Trillville at a sold-out show and signed the group to BME Recordings. Trillville debuted in 2003 with the single "Neva Eva", which peaked at #77 on the Billboard Hot 100 and #28 on the Hot R&B/Hip-Hop Songs charts in 2004. Collaborating with Lil Scrappy, Trillville came out with debut album The King of Crunk & BME Recordings Present: Trillville & Lil Scrappy in 2004. It featured the single "Some Cut", which peaked at #14 on the Billboard Hot 100 in 2005. Vibe described Trillville & Lil Scrappy as a crunk album and quoted Don P: "Our music is about whatever will make people move those [elbows] and be free about whatever they do."

Dirty Mouth left Trillville in 2007 to pursue a solo career, and Trillville left BME in January 2008. Trillville's second album Straight Up. No Chaser came out in 2008 released under the Swag Up label. With Dirty Mouth returning, Trillville released third album 3 Da' Hard Way in 2011., Recently Trillville has released their new group album “Dat Drip” on September 7, 2018.

== Albums ==
Album information
The King of Crunk & BME Recordings Present: Trillville & Lil Scrappy with Lil Scrappy
- Released: February 24, 2004
- Chart positions: #12 US
- Last RIAA certification: Gold
- Lil Scrappy Singles: "Head Bussa", "No Problems"
- Trillville Singles: "Neva Eva", "Some Cut", "Get Some Crunk in Yo System"
The King of Crunk & BME Recordings Present: Lil Scrappy & Trillville - Chopped & Screwed
- Released: January 25, 2005
- Chart positions: N/A
- Last RIAA certification: N/A
Straight Up. No Chaser
- Released: June 24, 2008
- Chart positions: N/A
- Last RIAA certification: N/A
- Singles: Money Line
3 Da' Hard Way
- Released: October 25, 2011
- Chart position: N/A
- Last RIAA certification: N/A
- Singles: N/A
Dat Drip
- Released: Sept 07, 2018
- Chart position: N/A
- Last RIAA certification: N/A
- Singles: Check Say

== Mixtapes ==
Mixtape information
DJ: TRAP-A-HOLICS: Trillville: 1000 Deep
- Released: April 6, 2010
- Listens: 1,099
- Downloads: 336
DJ DON PISTOL: TRILLVILLE: Da Mixtape B4 Da Mixtape
- Released: April 28, 2010
- Listens: 565
- Downloads: 166
DJ DON PISTOL: TRILLVILLE: Street Tape
- Released: June 1, 2010
- Listens: 1,354
- Downloads: 276

== Singles ==
Year	Song	Chart positions			Album
Year	Song	U.S. Hot 100	U.S. R&B	U.S. Rap	Album
2003	"Neva Eva" (featuring Lil Jon & Lil Scrappy)	77	28	22	Trillville & Lil Scrappy
2004	"Get Some Crunk In Yo System" (featuring Pastor Troy)	–	–	–	Trillville & Lil Scrappy
2005	"Some Cut" (featuring Cutty)	14	7	3	Trillville & Lil Scrappy
2006	"Nothing Less"	–	–	–	Trillville Reloaded
2008	"Money Line"	–	–	–	Straight Up, No Chaser
2023	"Get Active" (featuring Lil Scrappy)	–	–	–	Non-album single

== Music videos ==
- (2004) "Neva Eva"
- (2004) "Get Some Crunk In Yo System"
- (2004) "Some Cut"
- (2005) "Nothing Less"
- (2005) "Watch Me Do This"
