= Let Me Love You (Mario song) =

2004 single by Mario

Single by Mario

from the album Turning Point
- B-side: "How Could You"; "Whiz"
- Released: October 4, 2004
- Studio: Soundvilla (Miami Beach, Florida)
- Genre: R&B
- Length: 4:16
- Label: J
- Songwriters: Scott Storch; Kameron Houff; Shaffer Smith
- Producer: Scott Storch

Mario singles chronology
"C'mon" (2003)	"Let Me Love You" (2004)	"How Could You" (2005)

Music video
- "Let Me Love You" on YouTube

"Let Me Love You" is a song by American singer Mario, released by J Records on October 4, 2004, as the lead single from his second studio album, Turning Point (2004). The song was written by then-unknown American singer Ne-Yo, Kameron Houff, and Scott Storch, while production was handled by the latter. The song garnered Mario a Grammy Award nomination for Best Male R&B Vocal Performance in 2006 and became a top-10 hit worldwide, reaching number one in the United States, Canada, Germany, the Netherlands, and New Zealand.

"Let Me Love You" is considered to be Mario's signature song, as well as a prominent track in 2000s R&B music. In 2008, the song was ranked number 45 on Billboard's All-Time Top 100 Hot 100 singles, during the first 50 years of the chart. It was the eighth most successful single of the decade according to the Billboard Hot 100 Songs of the Decade chart released in December 2009. In 2013, it was ranked at number 53 on Billboard's All-Time Top 100 Hot 100 singles during the first 55 years of the chart. The remix of the song, also produced by Storch, contains rapped verses from Jadakiss and T.I.. An additional remix was released featuring verses from rapper Cuban Link and was included on Cuban's mixtape Man on Fire.

== Background and composition ==
"It was during a time where people were trying to figure out what was the new phase of R&B, and I think it set up a playing field of what R&B could be in the pop world, but still be cool and urban."
— Mario talking about the song's impact.

"Let Me Love You" was written by Kameron Houff, Ne-Yo, and Scott Storch, who also produced the track. Ne-Yo talked about the making of the song: "So my manager gets me down to Miami. [Storch] just happens to be working for Mario that week. We did, I think, three songs. And 'Let Me Love You' was the second song that we did. At the time we knew it was something special, but we had no idea that it was going to do what it did". Mario spoke about the song's creation to Billboard: "I was working with Scott Storch for about two weeks in Miami. There were parties every night, and girls everywhere… anything you can imagine in a Scott Storch movie, mixed with my newfound fame, was there. So most of the records on [Turning Point] are uptempo club records. When Ne-Yo came in, we were like, 'We actually need to make some R&B songs for the ladies.'" Ne-Yo revealed during a 2024 interview that he didn't think that Mario was the right performer for "Let Me Love You", because he considered the song's content too mature for an 18-year-old singer. Speaking about giving "Let Me Love You" to Mario, Ne-Yo said that "at the time that I wrote it I wasn’t trying to be an artist, I was completely content with just being a song writer but I think back on that song and I look back and think had I been trying to be an artist at the time that’s definitely one I would [have] held on to".

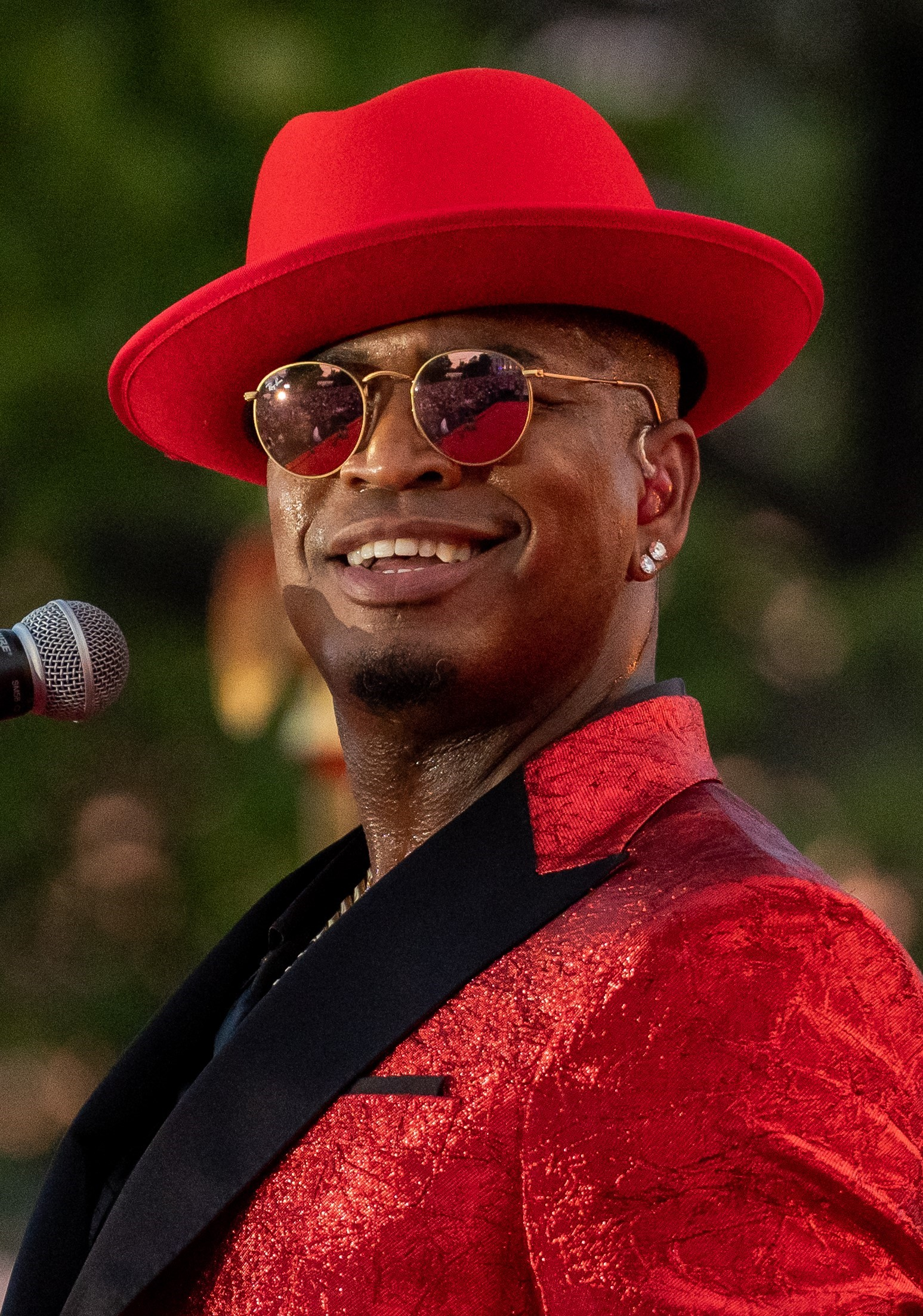
"Let Me Love You" was written by R&B singer Ne-Yo.

Speaking on the commercial success of the track, Mario said "Going from a child star to being a young adult is a very hard transition, and 'Let Me Love You' introduced me to the world as a young man", "I didn’t know it would touch so many people, but it was an emotional song and those records last forever." Ne-Yo said that writing "Let Me Love You" led him from being exclusively a songwriter into the beginning of his career as a singer.

"Let Me Love You" is a mid-tempo R&B love song in G minor, centered around the progression C minor / G minor / F major. It is written in common time. Stereogum described its instrumental as a "mechanized melodic backbeat with sturdy, clap-heavy drum track and some lost, wandering ’80s-style synth-pillows". The song's lyrical content focuses on the singer's desire to have a romantic relationship with a girl whose current significant other cheats on her. On "Let Me Love You", Mario was noted for portraying "a classic nonthreatening nice-guy type" character, with a Michael Jackson-inspired vocal performance.

== Critical reception ==
Contactmusic.com critic Tareck Ghoneim called "Let Me Love You" an "excellent track that oozes smooth soul, genuine feel good vibes and sing along sentiment as well. The beats have a lazy hip hop beat with soulful bass and seductive keys. It provides a nice and smooth backline for Mario to show what he’s made of and he delivers his soulful vocals with conviction and genuine serenity." Caroline Sullivan, writing for The Guardian found that the song's "silky exterior encloses a core of smut that's all the more compelling for the Alpine purity of Mario's voice." Billboard ranked the song at number seven in their "Top 50 Love Songs of All Time" list. Cleveland.com commented that the track "does away with any flashy elements, sticking to a classic R&B formula with Mario’s vocals leading the way. This one could have been a hit in any decade".

In her review of parent album Turning Point, BBC Music's Denise Boyd wrote: "The stand out track "Let Me Love You" has already tugged at the heart strings of the R&B audience, becoming a club, party and car stereo anthem on both sides of the Atlantic. Its smooth and soulful narrative sets the tone for much of this album." Jon Pareles from The New York Times commented that "Let Me Love You" "looks back to another 1980s blockbuster, lifting its keyboard sound from Tina Turner's 'What's Love Got to Do with It'." Today defined the track a "blockbuster hit" and "a passionate plea to take on an elevated role in his crush's life".

== Accolades and nominations ==
In 2004, "Let Me Love You" was nominated for a Vibe Award for Best R&B Song and two Teen Choice Awards, Choice Love Song and Choice R&B/Rap Track, but it failed to receive any awards. In 2005, it received nominations for Billboard Music Awards, including "Hot 100 Single of the Year", "Hot 100 Airplay Single of the Year", "Hot R&B/Hip-Hop Single of the Year", and "Hot R&B/Hip-Hop Airplay Single of the Year", winning in both of the R&B/Hip-Hop categories. It was also nominated for an MTV Europe Music Award for Best R&B Single, a Viewer's Choice award at the BET Awards, Best Single at the MOBO Awards, and Best R&B/Soul Song at the Soul Train Music Awards. In 2006, Mario was nominated for a Grammy Award for Best Male R&B Vocal Performance with "Let Me Love You". He also received an MTV Australia Awards nomination for Best R&B music video for "Let Me Love You".

== Commercial performance ==
"Let Me Love You" debuted on the U.S. Billboard Hot 100 the week of October 23, 2004, at number 97. The song went on to hold the number-one position on the U.S. Billboard Hot 100 chart for nine consecutive weeks from January to February 2005, and, as of 2026, is Mario's biggest single. It also reached number one on the Hot R&B/Hip-Hop Songs chart. Internationally, it reached the number-one position on the singles charts in Germany, the Netherlands, New Zealand and in the continental chart European Hot 100. In the United Kingdom, the song reached number two on the UK Singles Chart (held off the top spot by "(Is This the Way to) Amarillo"), making it Mario's biggest hit to date in the UK. The single also holds the honor of being one of the highest-selling ringtones with 1.6 million downloads.

== Music video ==
The music video for "Let Me Love You" features graffiti works.

The "Let Me Love You" music video was filmed at studios in Brooklyn, New York in September 2004. It was directed by Little X. The video starts with the singer talking with his friends about his new haircut. The video then transitions into a room with a red and white graffiti of two samurais, where Mario is by himself doing boxing training. He then sees through the room's window the girl he's attracted to being upset and uncomfortable with his friend. The video continues with different scenes of Mario dancing, alone or with backup dancers, on various sets. The clip ends with scenes of the singer dancing passionately with his love interest.

== Track listings ==
US 7-inch single

A. "Let Me Love You" (radio version) – 4:16
B. "How Could You" (radio version) – 3:59

US 12-inch single

A1. "Let Me Love You" (album version) – 4:16
A2. "Let Me Love You" (instrumental) – 4:17
B1. "Let Me Love You" (album version) – 4:16
B2. "Let Me Love You" (acappella) – 4:03

US 12-inch single (remix)

A1. "Let Me Love You" (remix—album version featuring Jadakiss and T.I.) – 4:29
A2. "Let Me Love You" (remix instrumental) – 4:27
B1. "Let Me Love You" (album version) – 4:16
B2. "Let Me Love You" (remix—acappella featuring Jadakiss and T.I.) – 4:02

UK CD1 and European CD single

1. "Let Me Love You" (album version) – 4:09
2. "Let Me Love You" (MaUVe remix edit) – 4:04

UK CD2

1. "Let Me Love You" (album version) – 4:09
2. "Let Me Love You" (remix featuring Jadakiss and T.I.) – 4:29
3. "Let Me Love You" (MaUVe remix extended) – 7:42
4. "Let Me Love You" (video)

UK 12-inch single

A1. "Let Me Love You" (remix featuring Jadakiss and T.I.) – 4:29
A2. "Let Me Love You" (remix instrumental) – 4:17
A3. "Let Me Love You" (remix—acappella featuring Jadakiss and T.I.) – 4:02
B1. "Let Me Love You" (MaUVe remix) – 7:42
B2. "Let Me Love You" (album version) – 4:09

Australian CD single

1. "Let Me Love You" (album version) – 4:09
2. "Let Me Love You" (remix featuring Jadakiss and T.I.) – 4:29
3. "Whiz" – 4:08
4. "Let Me Love You" (video)

== Credits and personnel ==
Credits are lifted from the UK CD1 liner notes.

Studios

- Recorded Soundvilla Studios (Miami Beach, Florida)
- Mixed at Larrabee North (North Hollywood, California)

Personnel

- Scott Storch – music and lyrics, production
- Kameron Houff – music and lyrics, recording
- Ne-Yo – music and lyrics (as Shaffer Smith), vocal production (as Nio)
- Mario – vocals
- Mike Tyler – guitar
- Conrad Golding – recording
- Manny Marroquin – mixing
- Alli – art direction
- Marc "Poppa" Baptiste – photography

== Charts ==
=== Weekly charts ===
Weekly chart performance for "Let Me Love You"
Chart (2005)	Peak position
Australia (ARIA)	3
Austria (Ö3 Austria Top 40)	6
Belgium (Ultratop 50 Flanders)	3
Belgium (Ultratop 50 Wallonia)	12
Canada CHR/Pop Top 30 (Radio & Records)	1
Czech Republic (IFPI)	46
Denmark (Tracklisten)	2
Europe (European Hot 100 Singles)	1
Finland (Suomen virallinen lista)	16
France (SNEP)	7
Germany (GfK)	1
Hungary (Rádiós Top 40)	18
Ireland (IRMA)	5
Italy (FIMI)	2
Netherlands (Dutch Top 40)	1
Netherlands (Single Top 100)	2
New Zealand (Recorded Music NZ)	1
Norway (VG-lista)	5
Scottish Singles Sales (Official Charts)	3
Spain (Promusicae)	18
Sweden (Sverigetopplistan)	18
Switzerland (Schweizer Hitparade)	2
UK Singles (Official Charts)	2
UK Hip Hop/R&B (Official Charts)	1
US Billboard Hot 100	1
US Adult R&B Songs (Billboard)	2
US Dance Airplay (Billboard)	3
US Hot R&B/Hip-Hop Songs (Billboard)	1
US Pop Airplay (Billboard)	1
US Pop 100 (Billboard)	2
US Rhythmic Airplay (Billboard)	1

=== Year-end charts ===
Year-end chart performance for "Let Me Love You"
Chart (2005)	Position
Australia (ARIA)	7
Austria (Ö3 Austria Top 40)	60
Belgium (Ultratop 50 Flanders)	30
Belgium (Ultratop 50 Wallonia)	76
Europe (Eurochart Hot 100)	15
France (SNEP)	67
Germany (Media Control GfK)	27
Hungary (Rádiós Top 40)	91
Italy (FIMI)	20
Netherlands (Dutch Top 40)	43
Netherlands (Single Top 100)	40
Switzerland (Schweizer Hitparade)	12
UK Singles (OCC)	18
UK Urban (Music Week)	1
US Billboard Hot 100	3
US Hot Dance Airplay (Billboard)	31
US Hot R&B/Hip-Hop Songs (Billboard)	1
US Mainstream Top 40 (Billboard)	6
US Rhythmic Top 40 (Billboard)	2

=== Decade-end charts ===
Decade-end chart performance for "Let Me Love You"
Chart (2000–2009)	Position
US Billboard Hot 100	8

=== All-time charts ===
All-time chart performance for "Let Me Love You"
Chart (1958–2018)	Position
US Billboard Hot 100	58

== Certifications ==
Certifications and sales for "Let Me Love You"
Region	Certification	Certified units/sales
Australia (ARIA)	Platinum	70,000^{^}
Denmark (IFPI Danmark)	2× Platinum	180,000^{‡}
France (SNEP)	Silver	100,000^{*}
Germany (BVMI)	3× Gold	450,000^{‡}
Italy (FIMI)	Gold	35,000^{‡}
New Zealand (RMNZ)	7× Platinum	210,000^{‡}
United Kingdom (BPI)	4× Platinum	2,400,000^{‡}
United States (RIAA)	Gold	500,000^{*}
Ringtone
United States (RIAA)	Platinum	1,000,000^{*}
^{*} Sales figures based on certification alone.^{^} Shipments figures based on certification alone.^{‡} Sales+streaming figures based on certification alone.

== Release history ==
Release dates and formats for "Let Me Love You"
Region	Date	Format(s)	Label(s)	Ref(s).
United States	October 4, 2004	Urban radio	J	
United States	October 18, 2004	Rhythmic contemporary radio	J	
United States	November 1, 2004	Contemporary hit radio	J	
Australia	February 14, 2005	CD	J	
Denmark	March 21, 2005	CD	J	
United Kingdom	March 21, 2005	CD	J	

== Anniversary edition ==
"Let Me Love You (Anniversary Edition)"

Single by Mario
- Released: February 14, 2020
- Genre: R&B
- Length: 4:11
- Label: New Citizen; The Orchard
- Songwriters: Scott Storch; Kameron Houff; Shaffer Smith
- Producer: Scott Storch

In 2020, Mario announced that he had re-recorded his vocals for the remastered version, celebrating the 15-year anniversary of the song. The anniversary edition was released on February 14, 2020.

== Covers ==
- Dutch producer Dastic sampled the song and released his own tropical house version featuring vocals from singer CADE. The version charted on the Belgian Dance and Ultratip Bubbling Under charts.

=== Samples ===
- In 2021, American artists Ghostface Killah and Shaun Wiah sample the song in the track Let Me Touch Ya.

== See also ==
- List of Dutch Top 40 number-one singles of 2005
- List of European number-one hits of 2005
- List of number-one hits of 2005 (Germany)
- List of number-one singles from the 2000s (New Zealand)
- List of Billboard Hot 100 number-one singles of 2005
- List of Billboard Mainstream Top 40 number-one songs of 2005
- List of number-one R&B singles of 2005 (U.S.)
