= Ready for the World (INOJ album) =

Studio album by INOJ
- Released: August 3, 1999
- Recorded: 1996–1998
- Genre: Pop; R&B
- Length: 61:49
- Label: So So Def/Columbia
- Producer: Charles Roane; Daren Hall; Jamie Portee; Ayanna Porter; Lil Jon

Singles from Ready for the World
- 1. "Love You Down" Released: May 30, 1997; 2. "Time After Time" Released: July 1998; 3. "Ring My Bell" Released: 1999

Ready for the World is the debut album by American R&B singer INOJ, released in 1999. The album took three years to complete. It was named after Ready for the World, the original artist of INOJ's debut hit single "Love You Down".

The album's first single, "Love You Down", was released in May 1997; it peaked at number 25 on the Billboard Hot 100 in February 1998. In July 1998, "Time After Time", a cover of the Cyndi Lauper song, was released and eventually peaked at number 6 on the Billboard Hot 100.

== Track listing ==
Credits adapted from the liner notes of Ready for the World.

No.	Title	Writer(s)	Producer(s)	Length
1.	"All I Want"	Ayanna Porter; Jamie Portee; Charles Roane	Charles Roane	4:04
2.	"Movin' On"	Porter; Portee; Daren Hall	Jamie Portee; Daren Hall^{[a]}	4:14
3.	"Time After Time"	Cyndi Lauper; Rob Hyman	Roane	4:13
4.	"Fallin'"	Porter; Portee; Hall	Jamie Portee; Hall^{[a]}	4:08
5.	"Wait for You"	J. R. Swinga; Roane; Porter	Roane	4:21
6.	"Precious Love"	Porter; Portee; Hall; D. Adams	Ayanna Porter	3:43
7.	"I Found Love"	Porter; Roane	Roane	4:11
8.	"Rather Be Alone"	Porter; Roane; Portee; Hall	Portee; Hall^{[a]}	4:39
9.	"What Can I Do"	Porter; Roane	Roane	4:02
10.	"Phone Intro"		Portee; Porter^{[a]}	0:38
11.	"Freaky"	Porter; Portee; Hall	Portee; Hall^{[a]}	4:02
12.	"Need to Feel"	Porter; Roane	Roane	3:53
13.	"Can't Wait"	Porter; Roane; Portee; Hall	Portee; Roane; Hall^{[a]}	3:49
14.	"Ring My Bell"	Frederick Knight	Lil Jon	6:57
15.	"Love You Down"	Melvin Riley	Roane	4:20
Total length:				61:49

Notes

- ^{^[a]} signifies a co-producer
