= Turning Point (Mario album) =

Studio album by Mario
- Released: December 7, 2004
- Studios: Ameraycan Recording Studio, North Hollywood, California; Heads Up Recording, New Jersey; Home Cookin' Studios, Philadelphia, Pennsylvania; Quad Studios, Nashville, Tennessee; Sony Studios, New York City; Soundvilla Studios, Miami Beach, Florida; Stankonia Recording, Atlanta, Georgia; The Inferno Recording Studio, Los Angeles, California; The Underlab, Los Angeles, California
- Genre: R&B
- Length: 49:18
- Labels: 3rd Street; J
- Producers: Big Tank; Carvin & Ivan; Melvin Coleman; Drama Family Entertainment; Theron Feemster; Sean Garrett; Jarvis "JRoc" Bonner; Allen "All Star" Gordon; Lil Jon; Harold Lilly; Scott Storch; The Underdogs

Mario chronology
Mario (2002)	Turning Point (2004)	Go (2007)

Singles from Turning Point
- 1. "Let Me Love You" Released: October 4, 2004; 2. "How Could You" Released: February 14, 2005; 3. "Here I Go Again" Released: June 20, 2005; 4. "Boom" Released: 2005

Turning Point is the second studio album by American recording artist Mario, released by J Records on December 7, 2004, in the United States. A R&B record with heavy elements of soul and hip hop music, it involves a diverse roster of collaborators including Scott Storch, Lil Jon, The Underdogs, Carvin & Ivan, and Sean Garrett. The album guests include Cassidy, Juvenile, Jadakiss, T.I. and Baby Cham.

The first single from the album was "Let Me Love You", which was written by Ne-Yo was a number one hit in the United States and number two in the United Kingdom, becoming Mario's biggest hit to date. The second single was a split single. In the US, "How Could You", a song written by Bay Area singer-songwriter J. Valentine, was released (reaching number 52) but in the UK, "Here I Go Again" was released (reaching number 11). The fourth and final single from the album in the US was "Boom", featuring Juvenile. In support of the album, Mario supported R&B trio Destiny's Child in their tour, Destiny Fulfilled ... And Lovin' It, as an opening act for the American leg. The album received two nominations at the 48th Grammy Awards including Best Contemporary R&B Album.

== Concept and themes ==
In an interview with MTV, Mario explained, "One of the biggest reasons I wanted to do it is that I did want to stand out from everybody. I get to share it with the world [...] It's good for me. I been blessed to be in this situation. Everything's been going great. I just been pacing myself, working real hard on this album. That's what my life is about right now: my transition into manhood." When asked about his decision to work his producer Scott Storch on material for the album, he elaborated: "He did a lot of stuff back in the day, you'd be surprised. He played me some stuff he did for Erykah Badu, for Lauryn Hill, for Eminem and 50 Cent. When I went to Scott, we went in the studio and freestyled and came up with some great records."

== Singles ==
Turning Point was preceded by lead single "Let Me Love You", released on October 4, 2004. Produced by Scott Storch, it became a worldwide success, reaching number one in Germany, the Netherlands, New Zealand, and the United States, where it peaked at number on the Billboard Hot 100 for nine consecutive weeks. The song also remained at number one on Billboard's Hot R&B/Hip-Hop songs for eleven consecutive weeks.

The album produced three further singles, including second US single "How Could You" which became a top-20 hit on the Hot R&B/Hip-Hop Songs chart. Elsewhere, "Here I Go Again" served as the album's second single. It became a top ten hit in Belgium and the Netherlands, also reaching the top 20 in Australia, Ireland, and the United Kingdom. Fourth and final single "Boom" peaked at number 23 on the Billboard Rhythmic Top 40 chart.

== Critical reception ==
Professional ratings
Review scores
Source	Rating
AllMusic	3.5/5 stars
Blender	3/5 stars
Entertainment Weekly	B−
The Guardian	3/5 stars
MTV Asia	7/10
Now	3/5 Ns
The Situation	4/5 stars
Uncut	3/5 stars
USA Today	3/4 stars
Vibe	3.5/5 marks

In his review from AllMusic, Jason Birchmeier wrote that "there's not much else on Turning Point that comes close to matching the balladic magic of "Let Me Love You" [...] Above all, though, it's "Let Me Love You" and its remix that make Turning Point a noteworthy effort for this teenager and a fine second album overall." Jem Aswad from Entertainment Weekly said that Turning Point "is plenty catchy, but it's also so full of sugar that the spoon stands up," giving the album a B−. Virgin Media said that "the production is tight throughout the album but not overly polished, and there is enough edge maintained from start to finish to suggest that Mario may indeed buck a few R&B trends in the months to come." The Washington Times called Turning Point "a solid follow-up to a promising debut."

Baz Dreisinger from Blender felt that "though the Baltimore-born singer is newly legal (as he tells us on the too-terse club jam "18"), his enticingly even-toned voice—smooth as R. Kelly's—transcends teen-pop. It's even manly enough to convey lovelorn intensity ("Here I Go Again"), offer explicit "Directions" to an uncorrupted gal pal ("Trust me, I got skills"), then sweetly stage an "intimate talk" with her ("Like Me Real Hard"). Only his age-appropriate tracks—the singsong club jingle "Girl I Need", or the irony-free homage to "Nikes fresh out the box" remind us that Mario is not a boy, but not yet a man." USA Today critic Steve Jones found that "the material seems more what you'd expect from an 18-year-old [...] There are still a few lightweight ditties and songs that show he hasn't completely left his youth behind ("Nikes"), but he seems pointed in the right direction." The Guardian's Caroline Sullivan wrote that "undisputed foxy dude that [Mario] is though, Turning Point owes its sparkling nowness to an astute choice of producers and guests."

The New York Times critic Jon Pareles noted that the "album reeks of calculation, and suffers only slightly for it." He found that WHILE "Michael Jackson – minus the weirdness – is Mario's vocal model and strategic guide [...] the music isn't retro. It's full of pointillistic computer productions and electronically tweaked vocals, and some tracks are ingenious." Jason Richard, writing for Now, found that Mario "ebbs and flows through the sophomore-album maturity model employed by every young artist from Avril to Britney, dealing with being done wrong and how he's got to have her and blah blah blah. The record's six-figure beats, provided by Scott Storch and Lil' Jon, are slicker than Aaron Neville's cocoa butter, ensuring that Turning Point will be a perennial fave among BET's 106 & Park fans."

=== Accolades ===
The album was nominated for Best Contemporary R&B Album at the 48th Annual Grammy Awards.

== Commercial performance ==
Turning Point's first appearance was in the US Billboard 200, selling roughly 161,000 copies in the first week, debuting at number thirteen. It was later certified platinum by the Recording Industry Association of America (RIAA), selling over 1.2 million copies. The album's last appearance was week 37/2005 in the Belgium Albums Top 50. Its peak position was number 6, on the Dutch Albums Top 100; it stayed there for one week. Its highest entry was number 9 in the Dutch Albums Top 100.

== Track listing ==
Turning Point – Standard edition
No.	Title	Writer(s)	Producer(s)	Length
1.	"18" (featuring Cassidy)	Mario Barrett; Ron "Neff-U" Feemster; Sean Garrett; Barry Reese	Neff-U; Garrett^{[a]}	3:46
2.	"Let Me Love You"	Scott Storch; Shaffer Smith; Kameron Houff	Storch; Nio^{[a]}	4:09
3.	"Couldn't Say No"	Barrett; Feemster; Garrett	Neff-U; Garrett^{[a]}	3:49
4.	"Boom" (featuring Juvenile)	Jonathan Smith; Johntá Austin; Terius Gray; James "L-Roc" Phillips; LaMarquis Jefferson; Craig Love	Lil Jon; Austin^{[a]}; Troy Patterson^{[a]}	4:06
5.	"How Could You"	J. Valentine; Harvey Mason Jr.; Damon Thomas; Antonio Dixon; Eric Dawkins	The Underdogs	3:56
6.	"Girl I Need" (featuring Baby Cham)	Harold Lilly; Derryck "Big Tank" Thornton; Robert Christianson; Robert Garrett; Marley Simms	Lilly; Big Tank	3:44
7.	"Call the Cops"	Barrett; Storch; Robert Waller	Storch; Waller	3:34
8.	"Here I Go Again"	Feemster; Jason Argsheben; Reginald Lewis; Aaron Sledge; Bryan Sledge	Neff-U	3:21
9.	"Nikes Fresh Out the Box"	Lilly; B. Sledge; Alloy "Fai" Hume; Rudolph Isley; O'Kelly Isley Jr.; Ronald Isley; Ernest Isley; Marvin Isley; Christopher Jasper	Lilly; Hume	4:31
10.	"Directions"	Lilly; Melvin Coleman	Lilly; Coleman	4:11
11.	"Like Me Real Hard"	Frank Romano; Ivan "Orthodox" Barias; Carvin "Ransum" Higgins; James "Jayshawn" Smith; Jarvis “JRoc” Bonner	Barias; Higgins; Bonner; Smith^{[a]}	4:50
12.	"Shakedown"	Allen "Allstar" Gordon Jr.; Dwayne Huff; Xavier Cordova	Allstar	3:33
13.	"Let Me Love You" (Remix featuring Jadakiss & T.I.)	Storch; Smith; Houff; Clifford Harris; Jason Phillips	Storch; Phillip "Taj" Jackson^{[a]}	4:29
Total length:				49:18

UK edition bonus tracks
No.	Title	Writer(s)	Producer(s)	Length
14.	"Whiz"	Ferrel Edward II; Lighty Clifton; Darren Lighty; Stacey Lighty; Balewa Muhammad	Eddie F; D. Lighty	3:42
15.	"Just a Friend 2002"	Mario Barrett; Warryn Campbell; John Smith; Biz Markie	Campbell	3:34
16.	"C'mon"	W. Campbell; Joi Campbell; J. Smith; Robert Ginyard; James Brown; Lyn Collins	Campbell	3:24

DualDisc bonus tracks

1. "Entire Album in Enhanced Stereo"
2. "Let Me Love You" & "How Could You" (music videos)
3. "Sessions @ AOL Special Live Performances: Let Me Love You & How Could You
4. "Photo Gallery"

Notes and sample credits

- ^{^[a]} signifies a vocal producer
- "Girl I Need" contains a portion of the composition "Gimme a Break," written by Robert Christianson, Robert Garrett, and Marley Simms.
- "Nikes Fresh Out the Box" contains a sample from "You Walk Your Way" and contains a portion of the composition "Shout," both performed by The Isley Brothers.

== Personnel ==
Credits are adapted from the album's Liner Notes and AllMusic.

- Mario – vocals sung by (1–3, 6, 8, 10, 12–13, lead on 4–5, 7, 9, 11)
- Kamel Abdo – recording engineer (1, 3, 9–10, vocals on 6), mixing (1)
- Allstar – mixing (12)
- June Ambrose – stylist
- Johntá Austin – background vocals (4)
- Marc Baptiste – photography
- Jarvis “JRoc” Bonner – Keyboard (1–3, 4, 10–12)
- Ivan "Orthodox" Barias – music programming, recording engineer (11)
- Big Tank – music programming, instrumental recording engineer (6)
- Warren Bletcher – assistant engineer (4, 10)
- Joel Campbell – additional keyboards (12)
- Chris Carmouche – recording engineer (4, 10), mixing (4)
- Cassidy – rap vocals (1)
- Cham – vocals sung by (6)
- Eric Dawkins – background vocals (5)
- Peter Edge – executive producer
- Ron "Neff–U" Feemster – instruments played by (1, 3, additional on 8)
- Steve Fisher – vocal recording engineer (13)
- Delvida Flaherty – production coordination
- John Frye – recording engineer, mixing (4)
- Sean Garrett – vocal arrangement (1, 3)
- Serban Ghenea – mixing (11)
- Conrad Golding – recording engineer (2, 7, instrumental assistant on 13)
- Reggie Hamlet – guitar, bass guitar (9)
- John Hanes – recording engineer (11)
- Jaymz Hardy–Martin III – assistant engineer, digital editing (6)
- Dabling "Hobby Boy" Harward – music director, music editing, recording engineer (5)
- Carvin "Ransum" Higgins – recording engineer (11)
- Charles "CJ" Hilton Jr. – background vocals (9)
- Bob "The Builder" Horn – guitar, bass guitar, recording engineer (8)
- Kameron Houff – recording engineer (2, 7, instruments on 13), mixing (13)
- Larry Jackson – A&R
- Jadakiss – rap vocals (13)
- LaMarquis Jefferson – bass played by (4)
- Juvenile – rap vocals (4)
- Chris LeBeau – artwork
- Craig Love – guitar (4)
- Kevin Mahoney – music assisted by (5)
- Manny Marroquin – mixing (1–4, 6–10, 12)
- Dwayne Moore – bass guitar (11)
- Jamie Newman – assistant engineer (13)
- Troy Patterson – a&r, executive producer
- James "L–Roc" Phillips – keyboards (4)
- Herb Powers – mastering
- Angelo Qualia – recording engineer (12)
- Tim Roberts – assistant engineer (11)
- Darrell Robinson – drums (11)
- Franky "Vegas" Romano – guitar, digital editing (11)
- Dave "Natural Love" Russell – music editing, recording engineer, mixing (5)
- James "Hal" Smith – background vocals (11)
- Johnnie "Smurf" Smith – keyboards (11)
- Frank "Mumbles" Sutton – recording engineer, tracking (11)
- T.I. – rap vocals (13)
- Mike Tyler – guitar (2, 13)
- The Underdogs – instruments performed by (5)
- Mike "Hitman" Wilson – vocal recording engineer (13)

== Charts ==
=== Weekly charts ===
Weekly chart performance for Turning Point
Chart (2004–05)	Peak position
Australian Albums (ARIA)	17
Australian Urban Albums (ARIA)	3
Austrian Albums (Ö3 Austria)	33
Belgian Albums (Ultratop Flanders)	10
Belgian Albums (Ultratop Wallonia)	42
Canadian Albums (Nielsen SoundScan)	56
Danish Albums (Hitlisten)	25
Dutch Albums (Album Top 100)	6
French Albums (SNEP)	42
German Albums (Offizielle Top 100)	13
Irish Albums (IRMA)	62
Italian Albums (FIMI)	25
New Zealand Albums (RMNZ)	22
Scottish Albums (Official Charts)	44
Swiss Albums (Schweizer Hitparade)	10
UK Albums (Official Charts)	8
UK R&B Albums (Official Charts)	3
US Billboard 200	13
US Top R&B/Hip-Hop Albums (Billboard)	2

=== Year-end charts ===
Year-end chart performance for Turning Point
Chart (2005)	Position
Swiss Albums (Schweizer Hitparade)	81
UK Albums (OCC)	91
US Billboard 200	45
US Top R&B/Hip-Hop Albums (Billboard)	19

== Certifications ==
Certifications for Turning Point
Region	Certification	Certified units/sales
New Zealand (RMNZ)	Platinum	15,000^{‡}
United Kingdom (BPI)	Gold	100,000^{^}
United States (RIAA)	Platinum	1,000,000^{^}
^{^} Shipments figures based on certification alone.^{‡} Sales+streaming figures based on certification alone.

== Release history ==
Turning Point release history
Region	Date	Edition(s)	Format	Label	Ref(s)
United States	December 7, 2004	Standard	CD; digital download	J Records	
Japan	February 28, 2005	Standard	CD; digital download	BMG Japan	
United Kingdom	March 7, 2005	Standard	CD; digital download	J Records	
Australia	March 14, 2005	Standard	CD; digital download	J Records	
Germany	April 4, 2005	Standard	CD; digital download	J Records	
United States	April 19, 2005	DualDisc	CD; digital download	J Records	
