= Love You Down =

1986 single by Ready for the World

- Artwork for the 12-inch vinyl single

Single by Ready for the World

from the album Long Time Coming
- B-side: "Human Toy"
- Released: November 1986
- Recorded: 1986
- Genre: R&B
- Length: 6:29 (album version); 3:58 (single version)
- Label: MCA
- Songwriter: Melvin Riley
- Producers: Gary Spaniola & Ready for the World

Ready for the World singles chronology
"Ceramic Girl" (1986)	"Love You Down" (1986)	"Mary Goes 'Round" (1987)

"Love You Down" is the title of an R&B song written by Melvin Riley Jr. Riley's former band, Ready for the World, originally recorded the song in 1986 and released it as the lead single from their second album, Long Time Coming produced by Gary Spaniola. A slow jam, "Love You Down" was a hit on the Billboard pop and R&B charts, spending two weeks atop the R&B chart in December 1986 and peaking at No. 9 on the pop chart in early 1987. This was Ready for the World's second R&B chart-topper, following the success of "Oh Sheila" in 1985. It also reached No. 24 on the Billboard Adult Contemporary chart. The song charted in the United Kingdom at No. 60 on the UK Singles Chart. The song has been covered by artists such as R&B singer INOJ and neo soul musician Me'shell Ndegeocello.

== Charts ==
Chart (1986–1987)	Position
U.S. Hot 100 (Billboard)	9
U.S. Hot Black Singles (Billboard)	1
U.S. Adult Contemporary (Billboard)	24
U.S. Hot Dance/Disco 12" Singles Sales (Billboard)	25
UK Singles (OCC)	60

Year-end chart (1987)	Position
U.S. Top Pop Singles (Billboard)	100
U.S. Hot Black Singles (Billboard)	7

== INOJ version ==
"Love You Down"
- CD variant of US artwork

Single by INOJ

from the album Ready for the World
- A-side: "Freak It" (Lathun)
- Released: May 30, 1997
- Recorded: 1996–1997
- Genre: R&B; Miami bass
- Length: 4:18
- Label: So So Def
- Songwriter: Melvin Riley
- Producers: Charles Roane and Lonnie Hill Jr.

INOJ singles chronology
"Love You Down" (1997)	"Time After Time" (1998)

Female R&B vocalist INOJ recorded a cover version of "Love You Down" in 1997 with the assistance of producer Charles "The Mixologist" Roane and Lonnie Hill Jr known as "Lon2". Featuring a faster beat and more percussion than the original in the Miami bass style, INOJ's cover was initially featured on So So Def Recordings' So So Def Bass All-Stars Vol. 2 compilation album. Shortly after the compilation's release in late June 1997, the song began amassing airplay, entering Billboard's Hot 100 Airplay chart on the issue dated August 2, 1997; it would go on to spend 45 weeks on that chart, becoming especially popular on rhythmic radio. A music video, directed by Eric Haywood and Rubin Whitmore in Atlanta, premiered in August. A physical single, also containing Lathun's "Freak It" from the same So So Def compilation, was later released in January 1998, making the song eligible for the Hot 100. The song ultimately reached No. 25 on that chart. "Love You Down" was later included on INOJ's debut album, incidentally titled Ready for the World, released by So So Def and Columbia in the summer of 1999. INOJ released the 20th anniversary of "Love You Down" on July 28, 2017.

=== Charts ===
Chart (1997–1998)	Peak position
New Zealand (Recorded Music NZ)	21
US Billboard Hot 100	25
US Dance Singles Sales (Billboard)	25
US Pop Airplay (Billboard)	19
US Rhythmic Airplay (Billboard)	5

Year-end chart (1998)	Position
U.S. Billboard Hot 100	88
U.S. Billboard Hot 100 Airplay	61

== See also ==
- List of number-one R&B singles of 1986 (U.S.)
