= Boom (Mario song) =

Single by Mario featuring Juvenile

from the album Turning Point
- Released: 2005
- Genre: Crunk&B
- Length: 4:06
- Label: 3rd Street; J
- Songwriters: Johntá Austin; Terius Gray; LaMarquis Jefferson; Craig Love; James "L-Roc" Phillips; Jonathan Smith
- Producer: Lil Jon

Mario singles chronology
"Here I Go Again" (2005)	"Boom" (2005)	"How Do I Breathe" (2007)

Juvenile singles chronology
"Nolia Clap" (2004)	"Boom" (2005)	"Rodeo" (2006)

Music video
- "Boom" on YouTube

"Boom" is a song by American singer Mario. It was written by Johntá Austin, LaMarquis Jefferson, Craig Love, James "L-Roc" Phillips and Lil Jon for his second studio album, Turning Point (2005), with additional writing from featured vocalist rapper Juvenile. Production was overseen by Jon, while Austin and Troy Patterson are credited as vocal producers. The song was released as the album's fourth and final single in 2005 and peaked at number 24 on the US Billboard Rhythmic Top 40.

== Critical reception ==
AllMusic editor Jason Birchmeier called the song one of the album's "immediate highlights." He described "Boom" as "a by-the-numbers rewrite of Usher's "Yeah," which likewise boasts Lil Jon's trademark production, a guest rap cameo, a dance club theme, and a catchy, simple one-syllable refrain." Caroline Sullivan from The Guardian and Angelina Yeo from MTV Asia also compared "Boom" to the Usher song, calling it "near-identical" and a "recycled version," respectively.

Billboard found that "though the song has all the makings of a formula R&B hit, it is hard to determine how successful "Boom" will be. On one hand, Lil Jon's synthesized keyboard riff that seemed so cool in his earlier songs is now becoming annoyingly redundant. Then again, today's music listeners seem to embrace anything that has been heard before." In her review of parent album Go, Gail Mitchell, also writing for Billboard, found that the song was "one glitch in the proceedings [...] Produced by Lil Jon, it's too derivative of Usher's 2004 megahit, "Yeah!."

== Commercial performance ==
"Boom" failed to chart on the US Billboard Hot 100 and the Hot R&B/Hip-Hop Songs chart, becoming the lowest-charting single. The song however debuted on Billboard's Rhythmic in the week of September 10, 2005. It eventually peaked at number 23 on the chart.

== Music video ==
A music video for "Boom" was directed by Benny Boom and filmed on September 13, 2005 at Club Avalon in New York City. It premiered on MTV's Total Request Live in 2005.

== Track listing ==
Digital remix single
No.	Title	Producer(s)	Length
1.	"Boom" (remix featuring Juvenile)	Lil Jon; Johntá Austin^{[a]}; Troy Patterson^{[a]}	4:18

CD single
No.	Title	Producer(s)	Length
1.	"Boom" (album version)	Lil Jon; Austin^{[a]}; Patterson^{[a]}	4:09
2.	"Boom" (remix)	LaMarquis Jefferson; Craig Love	4:31
3.	"Boom" (call out hook)	Lil Jon; Austin^{[a]}; Patterson^{[a]}	0:16

Notes

- ^{^[a]} signifies a vocal producer

== Credits and personnel ==
Credits lifted from the liner notes of Turning Point.

- Johntá Austin – background vocals producer, writer
- Warren Bletcher – engineering assistance
- Chris Carmouche – additional mixing, recording engineer
- John Frye – additional recording, mixing engineer
- Lamarquis Jefferson – bass, writer
- Juvenile – writer
- Lil Jon – producer, writer
- Craig Love – guitar, writer
- Troy Patterson – lead vocals producer
- James "L-Roc" Phillips – keys, writer

== Charts ==
Weekly chart performance for "Boom"
Chart (2005)	Peak position
US Rhythmic Airplay (Billboard)	23
