= Lil Scrappy =

American rapper (born 1984)

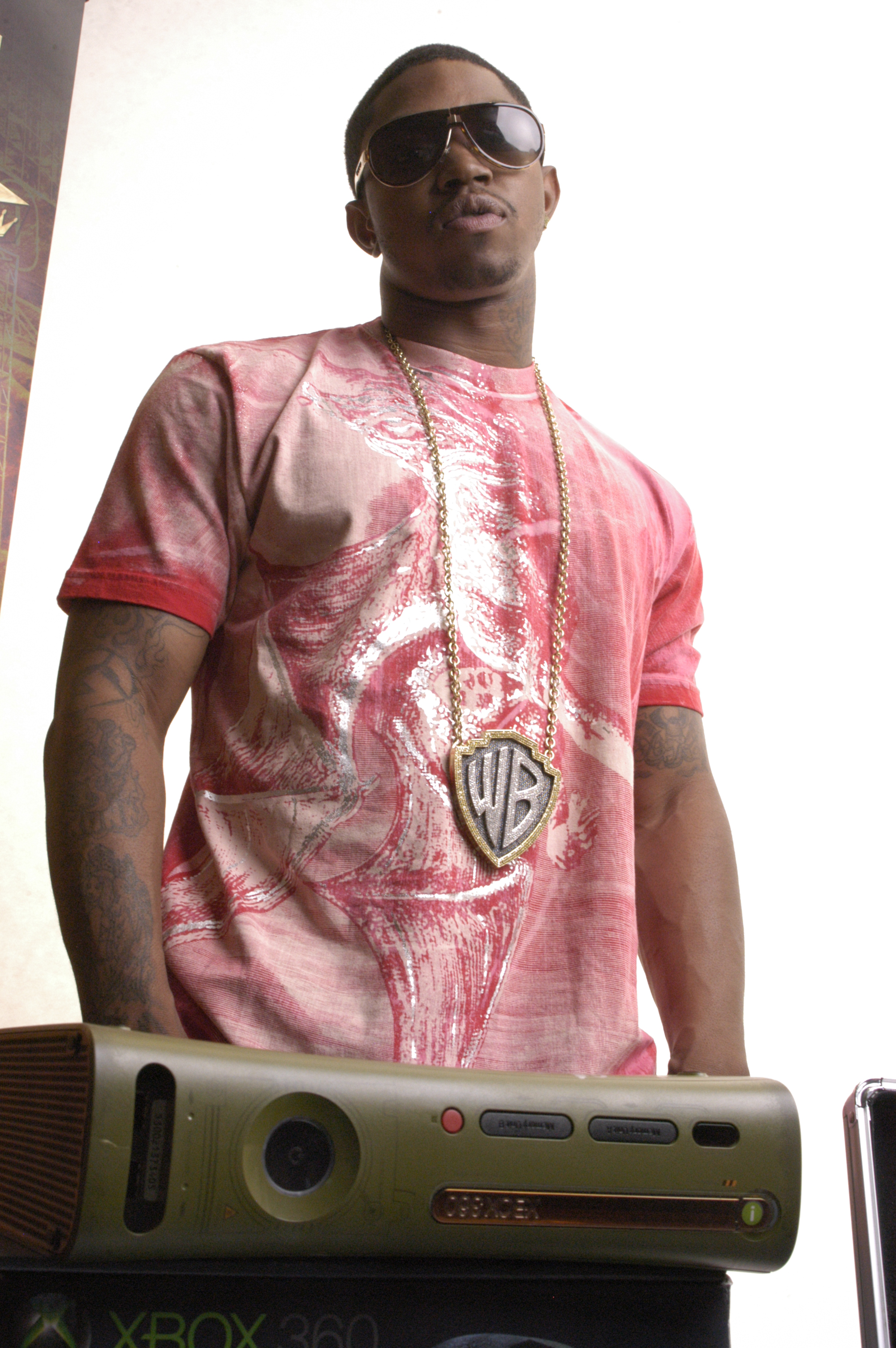
- Lil Scrappy in 2007

Background information
- Born: Darryl Raynard Richardson III; January 19, 1984 (age 42); Atlanta, Georgia, U.S.
- Genres: Hip hop; Southern hip-hop; crunk
- Occupations: Rapper; songwriter; record producer
- Years active: 2003–present
- Labels: Interscope; Geffen; G'$ Up; X-Ray; Babygrande; Cleopatra; Bonzi; S-Line; Real Talk; Fontana; E1; Def Jam; Disturbing tha Peace; BME; G-Unit South; Reprise; Warner Bros.

Darryl Raynard Richardson III (born January 19, 1984), professionally known as Lil Scrappy, is an American rapper.

Richardson was discovered by producer and performer Lil Jon while performing at a strip club in their respective hometown of Atlanta. Along with labelmates Trillville, Lil Scrappy was one of the first signings to Lil Jon's BME Recordings. Richardson has built a strong reputation and eager following throughout the Atlanta hip hop scene and the Southeastern United States thanks to his various mixtape releases. Richardson had his first child with Erica Dixon. He married Adiza "Bambi" Benson in 2017, with whom he has three children : a son, born on the 21st of September 2018, and two younger daughters. As of 2024 he has fathered 5 children, the youngest of which with Pick A Side contestant, Shakira Hardy.

== Career ==
=== 2004–2006: The King of Crunk & BME Recordings Present: Trillville & Lil Scrappy ===
Lil Scrappy's first album, The King of Crunk & BME Recordings Present: Trillville & Lil Scrappy (2004), was a split-release, with Trillville songs representing one "side" of the disk and Lil Scrappy songs representing the other. The album was produced by Lil Jon and reached #12 on the Billboard 200.

=== 2006–2008: Bred 2 Die Born 2 Live – G-Unit Venture ===
Lil Scrappy's debut album Bred 2 Die, Born 2 Live was released on December 5, 2006 on Reprise Records. East Coast rapper 50 Cent offered him a joint deal with G-Unit around that time.

The album was produced by Lil Jon and features appearances by 50 Cent, Bohagon, Lil Jon, Olivia, Three 6 Mafia, Young Buck, Young Dro, and Yung Joc.

The first single "Money in the Bank" features Young Buck and became Lil Scrappy's second Top 30 single. Money in the Bank peaked at number 28 on the Billboard Hot 100 chart, becoming his biggest solo hit and most commercially successful single to date in the U.S. as it surpassed the peak position of "No Problem" by one position. The second single from the album is called "Gangsta Gangsta" and features Lil Jon. "Oh Yeah (Work)" is the third single from Bred 2 Die Born 2 Live and features E-40 and Sean P (formerly Sean Paul) of YoungbloodZ.

=== 2008–2009: Prince of the South ===
Lil Scrappy's second album, Prince of the South, was released on May 13, 2008, through Real Talk Entertainment.

=== 2009–2012: Tha Grustle ===
Lil Scrappy joined the Disturbing tha Peace label in April 2009. Though still filming the motion picture Just Another Day, he was expected to tour that summer to promote his fourth studio album, Tha Grustle, after filming was complete. In November 2011, with the album still unreleased, he announced he'd left Disturbing the Peace and that the album would be released by Bonzi Records in 2012.

Lil Scrappy's second independent album, Prince of the South 2, was released on October 19, 2010, through Real Talk Entertainment just like his first independent album. On September 8, 2009, Lil Scrappy released the first single from the album entitled "Addicted to Money" but it failed to reach the Billboard charts so it was dubbed as a promo single. Then on September 28, 2010, Lil Scrappy released the first single from the album "Bad (That's Her)" which featured Stuey Rock, but it also failed to reach the Billboard charts, so it was dubbed as a promo single.

=== 2012–present: Love & Hip Hop: Atlanta ===
Since 2012, Lil Scrappy has appeared on thirteen seasons of Love & Hip Hop: Atlanta.

== Discography ==
Studio albums

- Bred 2 Die · Born 2 Live (2006)
- Prince of the South (2008)
- Prince of the South 2 (2010)
- Tha Grustle (2012)
- Confident (2018)

Collaboration albums

- The King of Crunk & BME Recordings Present: Trillville & Lil Scrappy (with Trillville) (2004)
- Silence & Secrecy: Black Rag Gang (with G'$ Up Click) (2009)

== Filmography ==
=== Television ===
Year	Title	Role
2012–2026	Love & Hip Hop: Atlanta	Himself
2016–2018	Leave It To Stevie	Himself
2018	Love & Hip Hop: Miami	Himself
