= Ready for the World =

American R&B band

- Origin: Flint, Michigan, U.S.
- Genres: R&B; funk; soul; pop; electro; new jack swing
- Years active: 1982–1991; 2004–present
- Labels: MCA Records; Thump Records
- Members: Melvin Riley; Gordon Strozier; Gregory Potts; Willie Triplett; John Eaton; Gerald Valentine; David Lyve

Ready for the World is an American R&B band from Flint, Michigan, that scored several pop, soul and dance hits in the mid to late 1980s. They were founded by Melvin Riley and Gordon Strozier.

== Discography ==
=== Studio albums ===
Year	Album	Peak chart positions			Certifications	Record Label
Year	Album	US	US R&B	CAN	Certifications	Record Label
1985	Ready for the World	17	3	44	RIAA: Platinum	MCA Records
1986	Long Time Coming	32	5	—	RIAA: Gold	MCA Records
1988	Ruff 'N' Ready	65	17	—		MCA Records
1991	Straight Down to Business	—	43	—		MCA Records
1996	Freak the World	—	—	—		Echo USA
2004	She Said She Wants Some	—	—	—		Thump
"—" denotes a recording that did not chart or was not released in that territory.

=== Compilation albums ===
- Oh Sheila! Ready for the World's Greatest Hits (1993, MCA Records)
- 20th Century Masters - The Millennium Collection: The Best of Ready for the World (2002, MCA Records)

=== Singles ===
Year	Single	Peak chart positions										Certifications	Album
Year	Single	US	US R&B	US Dan	US A/C	AUS	CAN	IRE	NLD	NZ	UK	Certifications	Album
1984	"Tonight"	103	6	—	—	—	—	—	—	—	—		Ready for the World
1985	"Deep Inside Your Love"	—	6	—	—	—	—	—	—	—	—		Ready for the World
1985	"Oh Sheila"	1	1	1	—	14	1	18	16	24	50	MC: Gold	Ready for the World
1985	"Digital Display"	21	4	3	—	—	—	—	—	48	—		Ready for the World
1986	"Slide Over"	—	57	—	—	—	—	—	—	—	—		Ready for the World
1986	"Ceramic Girl"	—	82	—	—	—	—	—	—	—	—		Ready for the World
1986	"Love You Down"	9	1	—	24	—	32	—	—	—	60		Long Time Coming
1987	"Mary Goes 'Round"	—	23	—	—	—	—	—	—	—	—		Long Time Coming
1987	"Long Time Coming"	—	54	—	—	—	—	—	—	—	—		Long Time Coming
1987	"Here I Am"	—	—	—	—	—	—	—	—	—	—		Long Time Coming
1988	"My Girly"	—	6	49	—	—	—	—	—	—	—		Ruff N' Ready
1988	"Gently"	—	30	—	—	—	—	—	—	—	—		Ruff N' Ready
1989	"Shame"	—	—	—	—	—	—	—	—	—	—		Ruff N' Ready
1989	"Cowboy"	—	—	—	—	—	—	—	—	—	—		Ruff N' Ready
1991	"Straight Down to Business"	—	15	—	—	—	—	—	—	—	—		Straight Down to Business
1991	"Can He Do It (Like This, Can He Do It Like That)"	—	9	—	—	—	—	—	—	—	—		Straight Down to Business
"—" denotes a recording that did not chart or was not released in that territory.

== See also ==
- List of number-one hits (United States)
- List of artists who reached number one on the Hot 100 (U.S.)
- List of number-one dance hits (United States)
- List of artists who reached number one on the U.S. Dance chart
