= Sean Garrett production discography =

This is the songwriting discography of Sean Garrett.

== Writing discography ==
=== 2004 ===
==== Janet Jackson - Damita Jo ====
05. "My Baby" (featuring Kanye West)

- Produced By Kanye West & Jimmy Jam & Terry Lewis

==== Usher - Confessions ====
02. "Yeah!" (featuring Lil Jon & Ludacris)

- Produced By Lil Jon

19. "Red Light"

==== Ciara - Goodies ====
01. "Goodies" (featuring Petey Pablo)

- Produced By Lil' Jon

08. "Ooh Baby"

- Produced By Flash Technology

==== Destiny's Child - Destiny Fulfilled ====
01. "Lose My Breath"

00. "Gots My Own" (Japan Bonus Track)

- Both Produced By Rodney Jerkins

02. "Soldier" (featuring T.I. and Lil Wayne)

- Produced By Rich Harrison

04. "T-Shirt"

- Produced By Dre & Vidal

05. "Is She the Reason"

06. "Girl"

00. "Game Over" (International Bonus Track)

- All Produced By 9th Wonder

10. "Through with Love"

- Produced By Mario Winans

=== 2005 ===
==== B5 - B5 ====
03. "Dance 4U"

00. "Nothin' Bout Me"

- Both Produced By Ryan Leslie

==== Mary J. Blige - The Breakthrough ====
02. "Enough Cryin"

- Produced By Rodney Jerkins

06. "Good Woman Down"

- Produced By 9th Wonder

18. "Show Love" (International Bonus Track)

- Produced By Chucky Thompson

==== Mario - Turning Point ====
01. "18" (featuring Cassidy)

03. "Couldn't Say No"

- Both Produced By Ron "Neff-U" Feemster and "Couldn't Say No" produced by Scott Storch too

==== 112 - Pleasure & Pain ====
10. "If I Hit" (featuring T.I.)

- Produced By [[M

ario Winans]]

==== Amerie - Touch ====
03. "Touch"

- Produced By Lil Jon

==== Chris Brown - Chris Brown ====
02. "Run It!" (featuring Juelz Santana)

05. "Gimme That"

- Both Produced By Scott Storch

==== Teairra Marí - Roc-A-Fella Presents: Teairra Mari ====
01. "Make Her Feel Good"

- Produced By The Co-Stars & Sean Garrett

02. "No Daddy"

- Produced By Blackout Movement

07. "La La"

- Produced By TrackBoyz & Sean Garrett

09. "Phone Booth"

- Produced By Bryan Michael Cox & Sean Garrett

10. "Confidential"

- Produced By Sean Garrett

13. "You Better Recognize" (Japanese Bonus)

- Produced By Sean Garrett

==== Various artists - "In The Mix OST" ====
04. Chris Brown - "Which One" (featuring Noah)

==== Omarion - O ====
05. "Drop That Heater"

- Produced By ARTTHEBEAT

==== Donell Jones - Journey of a Gemini ====
02. "Better Start Talking" (featuring Jermaine Dupri)

12. "If U Want" (featuring Bun B)

00. "Hands On You" (International Bonus Track)

- All Produced By Ryan Leslie

=== 2006 ===
==== Destiny's Child / Beyoncé - #1's / B'Day ====
00. "Check on It" (featuring Slim Thug) (Bonus Track)

- Produced By Swizz Beatz

==== The Pussycat Dolls - PCD ====
05. "Buttons"

- Produced By Polow Da Don

==== 3LW - Point of No Return ====
00. "Ain't Enough"

- Produced By Sean Garrett & Oak

==== Fergie - The Dutchess ====
04. "London Bridge"

- Produced By Polow da Don

==== Beyoncé - B'Day ====
02. "Get Me Bodied"

04. "Upgrade U"

05. "Ring the Alarm"

00. "Lost Yo Mind"

- All Produced By Swizz Beatz

08. "Green Light"

- Produced By The Neptunes

==== DMX - Year of the Dog...Again ====
07. "Dog Love" (featuring Amerie)

- Produced By Chad Elliot & Eddie Timmons

==== Kelis - Kelis Was Here ====
02. "Blindfold Me" (featuring Nas)

- Produced By Polow da Don

06. "Bossy" (featuring Too Short)

15. "Handful"

- Both Produced By Shondrae "Bangladesh" Crawford

==== Fantasia - Fantasia ====
05. "Not The Way That I Do"

- Produced By Kwame "K-1 Mil" Holland

==== Diddy - Press Play ====
16. "Thought U Said" (featuring Brandy)

- Produced By Mario Winans

18. "Making It Hard" (featuring Mary J. Blige)

- Produced By Rich Harrison

==== Jamie Foxx - Unpredictable ====
03. "DJ Play a Love Song" (featuring Twista)

- Produced By Polow da Don

==== Jay-Z - Kingdom Come ====
12. "Dig a Hole" (featuring Sterling Simms)

- Produced By Swizz Beatz

==== JoJo - The High Road ====
01. "This Time"

- Produced By Scott Storch

02. "The Way You Do Me"

- Produced By Swizz Beatz

==== Gwen Stefani - The Sweet Escape ====
05. "Now That You Got It"

- Produced By Swizz Beatz

==== Monica - The Makings of Me ====
05. "Hell No (Leave Home)" (featuring Twista)

- Produced By Bryan Michael Cox & Sean Garrett

00. "Thanks For The Misery" (Non-album Track)

- Produced By Anthony Dent

=== 2007 ===
==== Che'Nelle - Things Happen for a Reason ====
04. "Hurry up"

08. "Lookin'"

- Both Produced By Sean Garrett & Oak

==== Ciara - Ciara: The Evolution ====
11. "Bang It Up"

- Produced By Polow da Don

==== Britney Spears - Blackout ====
08. "Toy Soldier"

- Produced By Bloodshy & Avant

00."Pull Out"

- Produced By Lil Jon

00. "Kiss You All Over"

- Produced By Brian Kidd

00. "Red Carpet"

00. "Love"

==== Cassidy - B.A.R.S. The Barry Adrian Reese Story ====
00. "Untitled"

==== Nicole Scherzinger - Her Name Is Nicole ====
00. "Whatever U Like" (featuring T.I.)

- Produced By Polow da Don

00. "Winning Women" (featuring Rihanna)

- Produced By Sean Garrett & Clubba Langg

==== Kelly Rowland - Ms. Kelly ====
01. "Like This" (featuring Eve)

- Produced By Polow da Don

00. "Time By Myself"

- Produced By Warren "Oak" Felder

==== Enrique Iglesias - Insomniac ====
03. "Do You Know? (The Ping Pong Song)"

- Produced By Brian Kidd

==== Chris Brown - Exclusive ====
09. "Wall to Wall"

- Produced By Sean Garrett

==== Santana - Ultimate Santana ====
02. "This Boy's Fire" (featuring Jennifer Lopez and Baby Bash)

==== Mary J. Blige - Growing Pains ====
01. "Work That"

- Produced By Ron "Neff-U" Feemster

==== Joe - Ain't Nothin' Like Me ====
03. "If I Want Her"

04. "Where You At" (featuring Papoose)

- Both Produced By Sean Garrett

==== Omarion - 21 ====
09. "Beg For It"

- Produced By Timbaland & The Royal Court

==== Mario - Go! ====
11. "Let Me Watch"

- Produced By Mr. Collipark

==== Tank - Sex, Love & Pain ====
12. "I Love Them Girls (Timbaland Remix)"

=== 2008 ===
==== Raven-Symoné - Raven-Symoné ====
04. "What Are You Gonna Do?" (featuring Sean Garrett)

- Produced By Sean Garrett, Co-Produced By Walter "Great" Scott

08. "Stupid" (featuring Sean Garrett)

09. "Girl Get It"

- Both Produced By Sean Garrett, Co-Produced By Clubba Langg

11. "Shorts Like Me"

- Produced By Sean Garrett & Elvis Williams

==== Jesse McCartney - Departure ====
03. "Rock You" (featuring Sean Garrett)

05. "Into Ya"

- Both Produced By Sean Garrett

04. "How Do You Sleep?"

- Produced By Sean Garrett & Clubba Langg

==== Usher - Here I Stand ====
00. "Play Me" (Non-album Track)

- Produced By The Avila Brothers

00. "Still Me" (Non-album Track)

- Produced By The Royal Court - King Logan & Jerome "J-Roc" Harmon

==== The Pussycat Dolls - Doll Domination ====
02. "Bottle Pop" (featuring Snoop Dogg)

- Produced By Fernando Garibay. Coproduced By Clubba Langg

==== Beyoncé - I Am... Sasha Fierce ====
03. "Diva"

05. "Video Phone"

- Produced By Bangladesh

=== 2009 ===
==== Sef - "I Dare You ====
00. "Hey"

00. "Dem Girls" (featuring Saigon)

00. "That You Like" (Produced By Big Ben)

- "Don't Stop The Music (Leslie, Garrett, Hilson)
  - Produced By Ryan Leslie

==== Ciara - Non- Album Tracks ====
00. Feelin' On My A

00. Darkroom

==== BoA - BoA ====
01. "I Did It for Love"

- Features and produced by Garrett

02. "Energetic"

- Produced by Garrett (Co-Produced by Clubba Langg)

14. "Crazy About"

- Produced by Garrett (Co-Produced by Davenport & Spencer)

==== Mario - D.N.A. ====
00. "Break Up"

- Produced by Bangladesh

==== Amerie - In Love & War ====
00. "Heard 'Em All"

- Produced by Garrett (Co-Produced by Eric Hudson)

=== 2010 ===
==== RichGirl - Non- Album Track ====
00. "Trouble" (featuring Gucci Mane & Yo Gotti)

- Produced by Bangladesh

==== Teairra Marí - At That Point ====
00. TBA

==== Usher - Raymond vs. Raymond ====
00. "Papers"

- Produced by Zaytoven

==== Nicki Minaj - Pink Friday ====
00. "Massive Attack"

- Produced by Alex Da Kid

==== Diddy & Dirty Money - Last Train to Paris ====
00. "Loving You No More"

- Produced by Miykal Snoddy

=== 2011 ===
==== Beyoncé - 4 ====
01. "Lay Up Under Me"

- Produced by Beyoncé Knowles and Shea Taylor

==== Mary J. Blige - My Life II... The Journey Continues (Act 1) ====
11. Love a Woman (featuring Beyoncé)

- Produced by Team S. Dot and BridgeTown

=== 2012 ===
==== B.o.B - Strange Clouds ====
03. "So Hard to Breathe"

==== Brandy - Two Eleven ====
02. "Wildest Dreams"

- Produced by The Bizness

03. "So Sick"

- Produced by Bangladesh

06. "Let Me Go"

- Produced by Bangladesh

08. "Put It Down (featuring Chris Brown)"

- Produced by Bangladesh and Dem Jointz

10. "Do You Know What You Have?"

- Produced by Mike Will Made It and P-Nasty

16. "What You Need"

- Produced by Bangladesh

=== 2013 ===
==== Miley Cyrus - Bangerz ====
03. SMS (Bangerz) (featuring Britney Spears)

- Produced by Mike Will Made It and Marz

07. Love Money Party (featuring Big Sean)

- Produced by Mike Will Made It and Marz

==== Mindless Behavior - All Around The World ====
02. "Keep Her On The Low"

- Produced by Supaman

==== Kenny D. - Night To Remember ====
05. "Spend The Night Out"

12. "Sky High"

=== 2015 ===
==== Avery Wilson ====
01. "Change My Mind"

=== 2017 ===
==== Keke Palmer ====
01. "Wind Up" (featuring Quavo of Migos)

==== Sevyn Streeter - Girl Disrupted ====
12. "How Many"

- Produced by Squat Beats and Mr. Williams

=== 2019 ===
==== Jacquees - King of R&B ====
04. "Come Get It" (featuring YFB)

08. "Warning"

=== 2025 ===
==== Aaliyah - Unstoppable ====
00. "Gone" (with Tank)

- Written by Tank and Static Major. Produced By Sean Garrett & Azul Wynter
