= Thinkin' About You (Mario song) =

Single by Mario

from the album D.N.A.
- Released: September 4, 2009
- Length: 4:10
- Label: 3rd Street; J
- Songwriters: Jermaine Jackson; Andrew Harr; Richard Butler Jr.; Kevin Cossom; Karlyn Ramsey; Sean Davidson; Andre Davidson
- Producers: The Runners; The Monarch

Mario singles chronology
"Break Up" (2009)	"Thinkin' About You" (2009)	"Headboard" (2009)

"Thinkin' About You" is a song by American R&B singer Mario. It was written by Rico Love, Kevin Cossom and produced by The Runners and The Monarch for his fourth studio album D.N.A. (2009). The song was released by J Records on September 4, 2009 as the album's second single. "Thinkin' About You" debuted at number 96 on the US Billboard Hot R&B/Hip-Hop Songs and eventually peaked at number 45.

== Background and release ==
"Thinkin' About You" was written by Kevin Cossom and Rico Love and produced by Andrew Harr and Jermaine Jackson from The Runners as well as Andre Davidson, Sean Davidson, and Karlyn Ramsey from The Monarch. The song was originally set to include a guest feature from rapper Diddy. This version remains unreleased, although it was leaked online after a version of the song instead featuring Ace Hood was leaked, the latter of which was considered the demo for the Diddy version. Another leak of "Thinkin' About You" was a duet with fellow R&B singer Kelly Rowland.

== Critical reception ==
A reviewer for music website Djbooth.net said, "With the follow-up single, the singer reaches out to fans of his more traditional R&B balladry in addition to the club crowd" also, he adds "As if Mario’s Trey Songz-esque vocals and Rico Love‘s songwriting weren’t enough to sweep this female off her feet, The Runners heighten the ambiance yet further with a steamy, synth-packed instrumental".

== Music video ==
A music video for "Thinkin' About You" was filmed in London on September 27, 2009. Shot by Chris Robinson, director of the video for Mario's previous single "Break Up"(2009), it features Audra Simmons from girl group RichGirl's as the lead girl. The visuals were debuted on BET's 106 & Park on October 13, 2009.

== Credits and personnel ==
Credits lifted from the liner notes of D.N.A..

- Big Fish Audio – synthesizer, additional synths
- Rico Love – co-producer, vocal producer, writer
- Andre Davidson – producer, writer
- Sean Davidson – producer, writer
- Jermaine Jackson – producer, writer
- Andrew Harr – producer, writer
- Manny Marroquin – mixing engineer
- Kevin Cossom – background vocals, writer
- Christian Plata – mixing assistance
- Karlyn Ramsey – producer, writer
- Jeff "Supa Jeff" Villanueva – engineer, additional pro-tools
- James Wisner – recording engineer

== Charts ==
Weekly chart performance for "Thinkin' About You"
Chart (2009)	Peak position
US Hot R&B/Hip-Hop Songs (Billboard)	45

== Release history ==
Release history and formats for "Thinkin' About You"
Region	Date	Format(s)	Label(s)	Ref.
United States	August 31, 2009	Airplay	J Records	
United States	September 4, 2009	Digital download	J Records	
United States	September 25, 2009	CD single	J Records	
United States	December 1, 2009	Re-Release	J Records	
