= Put It Down (Brandy song) =

Single by Brandy featuring Chris Brown

from the album Two Eleven
- Released: May 4, 2012
- Recorded: 2012
- Studio: Zac Recording (Atlanta, GA)
- Genre: R&B
- Length: 4:08
- Label: Chameleon, RCA
- Songwriters: Shondrae Crawford; Sean Garrett; Chris Brown; Dwayne Abernathy
- Producers: Bangladesh; Sean Garrett

Brandy singles chronology
"It All Belongs to Me" (2012)	"Put It Down" (2012)	"Wildest Dreams" (2012)

Chris Brown singles chronology
"I Can Only Imagine" (2012)	"Put It Down" (2012)	"Don't Wake Me Up" (2012)

Music video
- "Put It Down" on YouTube

"Put It Down" is a song by American singer Brandy featuring Chris Brown. Taken from her sixth studio album Two Eleven (2012), it was written and produced by Sean Garrett, Shondrae "Bangladesh" Crawford and Dwayne "Dem Jointz" Abernathy along with Brown, telling the story of Norwood complimenting a prospective beau on his swag. The bass-heavy, R&B up-tempo track served as Norwood's first release under RCA Records, since signing to Chameleon Records under the label, and was released to US digital outlets on May 4, 2012.

Upon release, "Put It Down" was met by a warm response from critics, who criticized Brown's involvement on the song but generally praised the progressive production and suggestive lyrics. It reached the top forty of the Belgian Ultratop 50 chart as well as the South Korean Gaon Chart and the top-five of the US Billboard Hot R&B/Hip-Hop Songs chart, marking Norwood's tenth top ten entry and first since “What About Us?” in 2002.

The accompanying music video features interactions with Brown, as well as scenes including Norwood dancing in front of both blue-lit industrial backdrops and artful Jackson Pollock-esque green screens. Filmed in Los Angeles, California and directed by Hype Williams, the clip was creatively moulded by Frank Gatson Jr., and choreographed by Jaquel Knight. The video received general acclaim from critics, who commended the simplicity of the video, while many labeled it as her most fun visual in years. Norwood also teamed up with rappers 2 Chainz and Tyga to remix the single, while rapper Eve released a self-crafted remix on her EVEstylin’ Tuesdays series in November 2012.

== Background ==
"Put It Down" was revealed as the name of the album's official leading single in Norwood's interview for True Exclusives. Norwood confirmed the release of the song, following her February 2012 joint single "It All Belongs to Me" with fellow R&B singer Monica, on April 12, and also revealed Brown as a co-writer and vocal feature on the song. On her decision to release it as a single, she commented, "I love taking risks in music and it's great to challenge yourself to be different. That's what I love about the song." In a Billboard interview, Norwood further commented about the track, saying that she "felt like, [when] being gone for such a long time, you need to come back with something strong and shock people. Make them go, 'Wow, who is that? Oh my God, that's Brandy? I didn't' even know she can sound like that. Didn't know she would do a song like that?' Because It's completely different than anything I've ever done."

Musically, the singer described the song as “very commercial, but at the same time, it's got a dope hip-hop influence—it's club, it's radio, it's all formats." In August 2012, Norwood sat for an interview with Nadeska Alexis of MTV News, where she elaborated on how the song was conceptualized. "Chris Brown also wrote a song on the album called "Slower", so naturally he's heard other songs that I've done and he kinda just hopped on "Put It Down" — rapping and singing — and it was organic and very authentic." In this way, Brown ended up co-writing the track for Two Eleven. She further explained, that "when I heard it, I thought, 'This is great,' [because] he brought a whole new flavor to the record. Sean [Garrett] already made it kinda swagged out, but Chris is just the icing on the cake, and I appreciated him for being a part of it and just being so supportive as an artist. He's so great, the girls love him, and I thought it would be great to have him on board."

== Composition and lyrics ==
"Put It Down" was written by Shondrae "Bangladesh" Crawford, Isaiah Watkins, Dwayne "Dem Jointz" Abernathy, and fellow R&B recording artists Sean Garrett, and Chris Brown, while production was handled by Bangladesh and Garrett themselves, featuring co-production by Dem Jointz. The song is a bass-heavy, contemporary R&B up-tempo song featuring tinny percussion and canned claps. It begins with an electronically manipulated voice constantly repeating the song's chorus: "I’mma put it down / you gon' fall in love".

Lyrically, it features Norwood complementing a prospective beau on his swag. "You're talking so tough, damn, I love it all, even the way you flex, that's what turns me on," she sings. Later, according to Idolator blog, Brown adopts a Nicki Minaj-like vocal delivery and raps, "Sippin’ on that Brandy, that liquor comes in handy, girl, I know you fancy, but this party I'm financing." In the chorus, Norwood sings: "I’mma put it down / you gon' fall in love."

== Critical reception ==
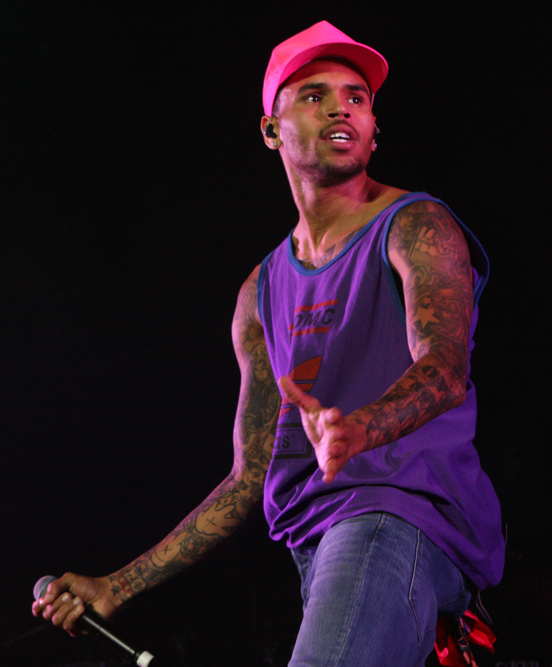
Chris Brown's (pictured) involvement received mixed reviews by critics, who felt his presence on the track was unnecessary.

The song received generally positive reviews from music critics upon its release. Priya Elan from The Guardian called the song "Brandy's best single for ages". He however found that Browns presence on the track was unnecessary and compared it to a "saxophone solo or Vanessa's bits in all of The Saturdays' songs." Robbie Daw of music blog Idolator found that it was "a catchy enough jam that we kind of wish we could hear sans Breezy. But given the lackluster performance of Brandy's previous single, the Monica collab "It All Belongs to Me", hitching up to Brown for a song ahead of her album launch probably seemed like the sensible thing to do." Chuck Arnold of People magazine gave the song three and a half out of four stars and added that "after that underwhelming reunion with Monica, Brandy really seems poised for a long-overdue comeback with this thumping, stuttering banger featuring Chris Brown."

Robert Copsey of Digital Spy found that "after 2008's ballad-packed Human, Brandy has opted for an altogether bouncier sound for the lead cut from her new album Two Eleven. In fact, its sparse beats and a melody that takes a few listens to grow reminds us of 2002's brilliantly hectic Full Moon." Mesfin Fekadu from San Francisco Chronicle felt that the record was "full of swag and one of the year's best thanks to its addictive beat." Andy Kellman from Allmusic declared the song "Two Eleven's most upbeat and commercial song" and felt it stuck "out on an album dominated by aching ballads and grown slow jams". Mark Edward Nero from About.com was of the opinion that while Norwood was stepping "out of her musical lane" on "Put It Down" she would manage "to make the track her own and sounds completely comfortable" on it.

Katherine St. Asaph of Popdust gave the song three and a half out of five stars, writing: "Brandy's voice, when not massed into (very nice, mind you) call-and-response, is either kept sliver-thin or made slightly affected, as if someone in the studio kept yelling 'Swag! More Swag!' across the room while she tried to record. Meanwhile, Chris Brown's verse is so chirped and pitch-shifted and accent-addled that you suspect this was meant to say 'featuring Nicki Minaj' before someone at RCA remembered it was supposed to be a hetero love song." Jason Lipshut of Billboard found that "the production pulls back at the right times and takes Brandy's persona into 2012 surprisingly smoothly." In a separate, less enthusiastic review, his Billboard colleague Andrew Hampp called "Put It Down" the weakest song on the album. He felt that it sounded like "the result of what happens when a label asks to hear a current single" and was "noteworthy mostly for its semi-tribute to the dearly departed Bran'Nu." Tanner Stranksy, writer for Entertainment Weekly, also called the track "one of the weakest offerings from an otherwise well-crafted for-the-fans album".

== Release and impact ==
"Put It Down" premiered on April 26, 2012, and was made available for purchase as a digital download in the United States on May 4, 2012. It was sent to US rhythmic and urban radio stations on June 5, 2012. On July 17, footage was released of Norwood practicing for future live performances of the song on entertainment news program Access Hollywood. On July 18, Norwood eventually performed "Put It Down" for the very first time at the Howard Theatre in Washington, D.C. The track had its television premiere on the MDA Show of Strength benefit concert, which aired on September 2, 2012. In October 2012, Norwood performed the single on American TV shows 106 & Park, Good Morning America and Live! with Kelly and Michael. Norwood performed the song, along with "Wildest Dreams", at the "Dick Clark's New Years Rockin Eve" special on January 1, 2013. She was the only R&B performer of the night.

On June 7, 2012, "Put It Down" debuted on the US Billboard Hot R&B/Hip Hop Songs chart at number 98. It eventually reached number three, marking Norwood's tenth top ten entry as well as her highest-charting single since her 2002 offering "What About Us?". Upon her returns to the top ten, Norwood tweeted, that “I can't lie-at one point I thought it was over for me in music but God had another plan thank you Father!” The song also peaked at number 10 on the US Bubbling Under Hot 100 Singles chart, which represents the twenty-five songs which failed to chart on the Billboard Hot 100, before making its debut at number 95 on the latter chart. It later reached number 65 during its tenth week. In South Korea, "Put It Down" debuted at number 28 on the South Korea Gaon International Chart on May 6, 2012. The following week, it peaked at number 24 for one week. The song also debuted and peaked at number 84 on the Billboard Japan Hot 100.

== Music video ==
=== Background ===
An accompanying music video for "Put It Down" was filmed in Los Angeles, California on July 10, 2012. For the visuals, Norwood reunited with director Hype Williams, with whom she had worked on several videos between the years of 1994 and 1995. While Frank Gatson Jr. served as the video's art director, Jaquel Knight handled the choreography. On her collaboration with Gatson, Norwood commented, "he [Gatson] gets the best choreographers when he puts his foot in something so he's really excited about everything that's happening. He loves the song and we are looking forward to working together and making this everything it's suppose [sic] to be." Brown also came to the set that day to film extra scenes with Norwood. In an interview with MTV News, the singer admitted that she was initially nervous about her performance in the video, stating:

"I was so shy, because I'm coming into my own as a performer, so I really wanted to do good. Standing next to Chris, he's so vibrant, like, 'What am I gonna do standing there next to him?' But I practiced really hard, like two weeks before Chris practiced — wait, I'm pretty sure Chris didn't need to practice. But I practiced, I was ready [...] Chris was not gonna upstage me! I was gonna be right there along with him shinin' too. I feel like I held it down a little bit, and I definitely did a lot better when Chris wasn't around, because I was shy."

During rehearsals for the video, Norwood posted pictures of her rehearsing on her Instagram account. On August 6, 2012, both Norwood and Brown gave links on Twitter to a preview of the music video. On August 13, 2012, a second teaser was shown on BET's countdown format 106 & Park. The following day, Norwood co-hosted the show and premiered the full video. By September 7, the video had reached the top spot on the countdown.

=== Synopsis ===
In the video, Norwood brings back her trademark braids, and she's paired them with a Madonna-esque cone bra, some body jewelry, white pants and a pair of heel-less six-and-a-half-inch high Giuseppe Zanotti leopard wedges. In the video, the singer dances with her girls in front of cars while sporting a head of curls in others. She entices a whole mob of men with her dance moves — they follow her around like lovesick puppies. Chris Brown dances alone in front of the paint-splattered letters for the bulk of his share of the clip, with his muscular, shirtless silhouette contrasting with the bright colors behind him, but gets fully clothes once more to join Norwood for a few scenes. Containing product placement, "Put It Down" advertises Vaio notebooks during the second chorus.

=== Reception ===
The video garnered a generally positive reception by reviewers. David Greenwald of Billboard magazine commented that the video was "bringing modern art to the streets" and that it "finds the R&B singer dancing in front of both blue-lit industrial backdrops and artful Jackson Pollock-esque green screens." Robert Copsey of Digital Spy wrote that Norwood and Brown are "seen flirting and dancing against a colourful backdrop" in the clip. Jazmine Gray of Vibe wrote: "Brandy still got it. In the eye-popping, Hype Williams-directed visual for her latest single, the R&B songstress sashays in front of Lambos and splashy backdrops." Similarly, Billy Johnson Jr. of Yahoo! Music commented, "Brandy is looking good and appears to have found her comfort zone when dancing in the "Put It Down" video [...] I was hoping the video would make me like [the song] more, but unfortunately it doesn't, despite the bright colors, Bran's couture looks, and sex appeal." Becky Bain of Idolator, called it "pretty tight, and Brandy looks pretty great."

Jenna Hally Rubenstein of MTV's Buzzworthy Blog noted that the video contains Norwood's "signature braids as she flirts and makes puppy eyes at Chris Brown [...] Not much else happens in the way of plot, but we're totally cool with that because watching Brandy and Chris nail their choreography while almost potentially kissing is waayyyy enough for us to have this vid on repeat basically the entire week. Katie Hasty of HitFix described the video as "big splashes of bold colors – Williams' specialty – and some fresh moves from Brandy and her merry band of street dancers." She, however, noted, that "Brown, meanwhile, dons his favorite pair of painters overalls and pretends to flirt with Brandy. Their chemistry is like that of a cat to a vacuum cleaner."

== Track listing ==
Digital download

1. "Put It Down" (featuring Chris Brown) – 4:08

Official remix

1. "Put It Down" (featuring 2 Chainz & Tyga) – 4:08

== Credits and personnel ==
Credits adapted from the liner notes of Two Eleven.

- Songwriting – Shondrae Crawford, Sean Garrett, Chris Brown, Dwayne Abernathy
- Production – Bangladesh, Sean Garrett
- Programming and additional vocals – Dwayne "Dem Jointz" Abernathy
- Recording – Mike "Snotty" Miller
- Recording assistance - Cody Sciara
- Mixing – Jaycen Joshuaby, Fabian Marasciullo
- Mixing assistance - Trehy Harris, Alex Dilliplane
- Mastering - Dave Kutch

== Charts ==
=== Weekly charts ===
Chart (2012)	Peak position
Belgium (Ultratip Bubbling Under Wallonia)	37
Germany (Deutsche Urban Charts)	5
Netherlands (Urban Top 100)	17
South Korea International (Gaon Chart)	24
Japan Hot 100 (Billboard)	84
US Billboard Hot 100	65
US Hot R&B/Hip-Hop Songs (Billboard)	3
US Rhythmic Airplay (Billboard)	27

=== Remix charts ===
Chart (2012)	Peak position
Germany (Deutsche Urban Charts): Official remix; featuring 2 Chainz and Tyga	28

=== Year-end charts ===
Chart (2012)	Position
US Hot R&B/Hip-Hop Songs (Billboard)	34

== Release history ==
List of release dates, showing region, release format, label and reference
Region	Date	Format(s)	Label	Ref.
United States	May 4, 2012	Digital download	Chameleon, RCA Records	
Germany	May 25, 2012	Digital download	Sony Music Entertainment	
United States	June 5, 2012	Urban/rhythmic contemporary radio	Chameleon, RCA Records	
United Kingdom	July 1, 2012	Digital download	RCA Records	
