= Wildest Dreams (Brandy song) =

Single by Brandy

from the album Two Eleven
- Released: August 28, 2012
- Studio: Westlake Recording Studios (Los Angeles, California); Hit Factory Criteria (Miami, Florida)
- Genre: R&B
- Length: 4:28
- Label: Chameleon; RCA
- Songwriters: Sean Garrett; Justin Henderson; Christopher Whitacre
- Producers: Tha Bizness; Sean Garrett

Brandy singles chronology
"Put It Down" (2012)	"Wildest Dreams" (2012)	"Magic" (2015)

Music video
- "Wildest Dreams" on YouTube

"Wildest Dreams" is a song recorded by American recording artist Brandy for her sixth studio album, Two Eleven (2012). It was written by Sean Garrett, Justin Henderson and Christopher Whitacre, with production helmed by Henderson and Whitacre under their production moniker Tha Bizness. "Wildest Dreams" is a mid-tempo R&B ballad which was inspired by R&B music from the 1990s and has lyrics which speak about the disbelief for finding love again. It was inspired by Norwood finding love with music executive Ryan Press. Garrett, who wrote nine songs for Two Eleven, noticed the Norwood and Press's connection and adapted the lyrics for "Wildest Dreams".

The song was released for digital download on August 28, 2012, serving as the second single from the album. It managed to peak at number 68 on the Hot R&B/Hip-Hop Songs chart but failed to enter the Billboard Hot 100 and reached the top twenty of the South Korean Gaon Chart. An accompanying music video for "Wildest Dreams", directed by American photographer Matthew Rolston, was filmed in Los Angeles, California in October 2012 and released to a positive reception by reviewers the following month.

== Background and release ==
In early 2009 songwriter Amanda Ghost was appointed president of Norwood's record label Epic Records. and after much restructuring Norwood's future with the label seemed uncertain. An interview with producer Tricky Stewart in November 2011 would reveal that Norwood's contract had been terminated with Epic Records and much of the material she had recorded for sixth album Two Eleven would remain at Epic, some of which was assigned to other artists. Norwood's joint record deal with RCA and producer Breyon Prescott's Chameleon Records was finalized in late 2010, however, it was not announced to the public until August 2011, when it was also confirmed that Norwood's sixth studio album would be released in 2012. After Norwood was signed in late 2010, professional recording and submissions for the album began.

One of nine songs that Sean Garrett wrote or co-wrote for the album, "Wildest Dreams" was confirmed to be the album's second single on August 20, 2012 during an album listening party at Germano Studios, New York City. Previously Norwood had advocated for a song called "Without You" to be the second single while the label had initially wanted "So Sick" to be the second single. The song made its world premiere on August 21, 2012. It was released for digital download from August 28, 2012.

== Music and lyrics ==
"Wildest Dreams" is a mid-tempo R&B song written by Sean Garrett, Justin Henderson and Christoper Whitacre, with production helmed by the latter two under the production company moniker Tha Bizness. Described by Norwood as a "90s 2012 record", "Wildest Dream" contains strong themes about love. Speaking on the song's content Norwood said, "It's about love. It's about falling in love with someone and it's almost like it's too good to be true. It's a mid-tempo." The song focuses on falling in love and it feeling better than one could have imagined. MTV Buzzworthy described the song as a throwback to "classic R&B" with a "laidback" tone. Steven J. Horrowitz from Rolling Stone described the base of the song was described as "thawacking percussion" and melodic production.

"I reconnected with [Ryan] because I had met him before, we kinda fell in love. Basically the song is just about me feeling like, "Wow. I can't believe this is really happening." He loves me for every personality I have. He loves me for every flaw. He accepts me as who I am and he can see me for who I am. He's dope for that. I see him too. So, never in my wildest dreams..."

— Norwood talking to Rap-Up about the song.

The title of the song is built around the recurring lines: "And now I'm receiving abundance of love/ And I get it/ But never could imagine it/ Never in my wildest dreams, no, no, no/ Did I think someone could care about me, oh/ Not just the way you love me". A introspective ballad, "Wildest Dreams" includes the lyrics "Never in my wildest dreams did I think someone could care 'bout me/ Not just the way you love me, but you know I'm emotional (sometimes)." During the course of the song, Norwood mentions herself several times, with lines like "It's hard to hold back tears whenever you hold me close, I think about the years and been saying this is all I want, Just wanted someone real to love me for me, me, just Brandy." MTV Buzzworthy compared the songs to Norwood's previous singles "Full Moon" (2002) and "Right Here (Departed)" (2008). Norwood said that the song was inspired by her newfound love with music executive Ryan Press.

== Critical reception ==
The song received critical acclaim. Mark Edward Nero from About.com called the song "one of the album's highlights". He felt that it "manages to be both strong and vulnerable at the same time, something that could also be said about the album as a whole." Andrew Chan, writing for Slant Magazine, found that "kicking off with a hard-knocking throwback beat, the opening seconds pit two familiar Brandys against each other—an ethereal flurry of stacked harmonies against a robotic delivery reminiscent of her style on 2002's futuristic-sounding Full Moon." He felt it were the verses "that bring the surprise: a raw, almost abrasive rasp in her tone, complemented by a needle-on-vinyl crackle looped in the background." Jenna Hally Rubenstein from MTV News' Buzzworthy blog was impressed with "Wildest Dreams", praising Norwood's "lush vocals", the song's melodic production and the strong sentiments of love in the lyrics. Billboard's Andrew Hampp declared "Wildest Dreams" "arguably its strongest moment" on the album, and wrote: "[It] is a return to the beat-driven ballads upon which Brandy built her name in the 90s, with warm layers of piano and even jazz flute that recall 1995's "Best Friend." Allmusic, Rap-Up and USA Today ranked the song among their favorite tracks on the album.

== Music video ==
=== Background ===
The music video for "Wildest Dreams" was directed by American photographer Matthew Rolston, marking his third collaboration with Norwood following their work on the videos for her singles "Best Friend" (1995) and "Afrodisiac" (2004). As confirmed by Norwood via Twitter, the clip was filmed in Los Angeles, California on October 11, 2012, featuring choreography by Frank Gatson Jr. A 30-second preview of the music video was shown on BET's 106 & Park on October 16, 2012. The full video premiered on November 2, 2012 on the music video countdown format. Since the premiere the video has reached the top spot on the countdown, which is the second of her videos to do so this year.

A stylized performance video, "Wildest Dreams" features Norwood performing the song onstage in front of cheering fans inside a warehouse, flanked by three back-up singers. Intercut with black-and-white solo shots, Norwood wears skimp blue-jean shorts with red boots in the visuals.

=== Reception ===
Norwood along with her background dancers in a sequence from the "Wildest Dreams" video.

The video garnered a generally positive reception by reviewers. Keenan Higgins from Vibe magazine wrote that the clip felt like a celebration of the success of the Two Eleven album and commented "it's definitely great to see Brandy back at it, and killing it like it's 1998 all over again." Melinda Newman, writing for HitFix, found that Norwood was bringing it "old school with the new video." Though she questioned why "there's no room in the video for anything other than Brandy's legs", she declared it as "sexy without ever crossing a line." Sam Lansky of Idolator remarked that Norwood was "keeping it simple in the video," and complimented "how effectively Brandy works out that choreography: Wearing high-waisted shorts and looking like she's about 80% legs, Brandy shows she can still pop with the best of 'em. It's clean and elegant. Even with crazy competition, Brandy still does R&B better than the rest." Juicy magazine writer Shirea L. Carroll stated the clip was "filled with Beyoncé-esque choreography," which was proving that Norwood "knows how to make 90s R&B current." Blogging website Perezhilton.com called the video "dandy and will make you do the opposite facial expression of the frowny."

== Credits and personnel ==
Credits adapted from the liner notes of Two Eleven.

- Tha Bizeness – production
- Sean Garrett – production, writing
- Conrad Golding – recording
- Trehy Harris – mixing assistance
- Justin Henderson – writing
- Jaycen Joshuaby – mixing
- Dave Kutch – mastering
- Mike "Snotty" Miller – recording
- Brandy Norwood – vocals
- Christoper Whitacre – writing

== Charts ==
The song debuted on the US Billboard Hot R&B/Hip Hop Songs chart at number 93 during the week of September 21, 2012. It peaked at number 68 during the week of October 13, 2012.

Chart performance for "Wildest Dreams"
Chart (2012)	Peak position
South Korean Gaon International Chart	19
US Hot R&B/Hip-Hop Songs (Billboard)	68
US R&B/Hip-Hop Airplay (Billboard)	44

== Release history ==
List of release dates, showing region, release format, label and reference
Region	Date	Format(s)	Label	Ref.
Various	August 21, 2012	Premiere	Chameleon, RCA Records	
United States	August 28, 2012	Digital download	Chameleon, RCA Records	
Germany	August 31, 2012	Digital download	Sony Music Entertainment	
United States	September 11, 2012	Urban AC	Chameleon, RCA	
