= The Inkwell (album) =

Mixtape by Sean Garrett
- Released: August 24, 2010
- Recorded: 2009–2010
- Genres: Hip hop, R&B
- Label: Interscope Records

Sean Garrett chronology
Turbo 919 (2008)	The Inkwell (2010)

Singles from The Inkwell
- 1. "Get It All" Released: March 9, 2010

Professional ratings
Review scores
Source	Rating
Boi Genius	(D)

The Inkwell is the first mixtape by singer-songwriter-producer-rapper Sean Garrett, hosted by DJ Green Lantern. It was released on August 24, 2010, as a free download. The mixtape features Soulja Boy, Roscoe Dash, Drake, Tyga, Gucci Mane, Nicki Minaj, Lil Wayne, Bun B, and Yo Gotti.

== Track listing ==
No.	Title	Length
1.	"Intro"	3:01
2.	"Writer and Rider"	1:39
3.	"Strip Club" (featuring Soulja Boy)	3:23
4.	"Whoa" (featuring Roscoe Dash)	2:46
5.	"Come Til My Girl Come" (featuring Fabolous)	3:30
6.	"She Geeked" (featuring Tyga & Gucci Mane)	4:03
7.	"Wait" (featuring Rocko)	4:03
8.	"Feel Love" (featuring Drake)	3:57
9.	"Oh My God"	2:33
10.	"Get It All" (featuring Nicki Minaj)	3:55
11.	"Girls on Girls" (featuring Lil Wayne)	2:54
12.	"Summer Love" (featuring Bun B & Yo Gotti)	3:18
13.	"Stoopidd"	2:13
14.	"Hood of My Car"	4:15
15.	"One Day"	3:36
