= Feel Love =

Single by Sean Garrett featuring Drake or J. Cole

from the album The Inkwell
- Released: February 4, 2011
- Recorded: 2010
- Genre: R&B
- Length: 4:03
- Label: Columbia
- Songwriters: Garrett Hamler; Aubrey Graham (original); Jermaine Cole; Kennard Garrett
- Producers: Sean Garrett; Clubba Langg

Sean Garrett singles chronology
"Massive Attack" (2010)	"Feel Love" (2011)	"In da Box" (2011)

J. Cole singles chronology
"A Star Is Born" (2010)	"Feel Love" (2011)	"Work Out" (2011)

Music video
- "Feel Love" on YouTube

"Feel Love" is a song by American singer Sean Garrett featuring American rapper J. Cole, released by Columbia Records on February 4, 2011 as the lead single from Garrett's unreleased second studio album. The song was originally included on his debut mixtape The Inkwell (2010), however that version featured Canadian rapper Drake instead of Cole.

== Music video ==
The music video premiered on February 15, 2011 via Myspace. It was directed by TAJ Stansberry.

== Charts ==
Chart (2010–2011)	Peak position
US Billboard Hot R&B/Hip-Hop Songs	49
