= Turbo 919 =

Studio album by Sean Garrett
- Released: May 27, 2008
- Length: 52:06
- Labels: Bet I Penned It; Interscope
- Producers: Avila Brothers; Bloodshy & Avant; Brass 'n Blues; Sean Garrett; Rodney Jerkins; Clubba Langg; Los Da Mystro; The Neptunes; StarGate

Sean Garrett chronology
Turbo 919 (2008)	The Inkwell (2010)

Singles from Turbo 919
- 1. "Grippin'" Released: August 28, 2007; 2. "Come On In" Released: February 19, 2008; 3. "6 in the Morning" Released: June 24, 2008; 4. "Lay Up Under Me" Released: November 25, 2008

Turbo 919 is the debut studio album by American singer Sean Garrett. It was released on May 27, 2008, via Bet I Penned It and Interscope Records. Production was handled by Garrett himself, together with the Avila Brothers, Bloodshy & Avant, Brass 'n Blues, Carlos McKinney, Darkchild, StarGate and The Neptunes. Turbo 919 features guest appearances from Akon, Lil Wayne, Ludacris and Pharrell Williams.

== Critical reception ==
Professional ratings
Review scores
Source	Rating
About.com	1.5/5 stars
Blender	2.5/5 stars
Spin	2.5/5 stars

Spin editor Mikael Wood noted that with Turbo 919, Garrett "demonstrates that his behind-the-boards work has prepared him reasonably well for a turn in the spotlight. Unfortunately, few of Garrett's ideas about romance have evolved past the knuckle-dragging stage, which weighs down Turbo 919's sleek, precision-geared beats with loads of brain-dead machismo." In a negative review for About.com, Mark Edward Nero wrote: "Garrett is nowhere near as good of a singer as he is a songwriter. He may have been partially responsible for such hits as Usher's "Yeah!," Ciara's "Goodies" and Chris Brown's "Run It!," but Turbo 919 is a hit-less, witless mess that's a strong contender for worst album of the year."

== Commercial performance ==
In Japan, Rhona peaked at number 12 on the Oricon Albums Chart, spending eight weeks on the chart.

== Track listing ==
Turbo 919 track listing
No.	Title	Writer(s)	Producer(s)	Length
1.	"Deep Sleep" (Intro)			1:12
2.	"What You Doin' with That"	Sean Garrett; Kennard Garrett	S. Garrett; Clubba Langg	3:34
3.	"Come on In" (featuring Akon)	S. Garrett; Aliaune Thiam; Jamil Pierre	S. Garrett; Deputy^{[a]}	4:46
4.	"Girlfriend Ringtone" (featuring Lil' Wayne)	S. Garrett; Dwayne Carter; Carlos McKinney	Los Da Mystro; S. Garrett	4:41
5.	"Turbo 919"	S. Garrett; Christian Karlsson; Pontus Winnberg; Henrik Jonback	Bloodshy & Avant; S. Garrett	3:32
6.	"I Still Believe" (Interlude)			1:34
7.	"Lay Up Under Me"	S. Garrett; Tor Erik Hermansen; Mikkel Eriksen	Stargate; S. Garrett^{[a]}	4:28
8.	"On the Hood"	S. Garrett; Bobby Ross Avila; Issiah J. Avila	The Avila Brothers; S. Garrett	4:29
9.	"She Likes Me" (Interlude)			1:34
10.	"6 in the Morning"	S. Garrett; McKinney	Los Da Mystro; S. Garrett	3:45
11.	"Grippin'" (featuring Ludacris)	S. Garrett; Christopher Bridges; Pierre	S. Garrett; Deputy^{[a]}	3:40
12.	"Patrón" (featuring Pharrell Williams)	S. Garrett; Pharrell Williams	The Neptunes; S. Garrett^{[b]}	3:08
13.	"Pretty Girl"	S. Garrett; Rodney Jerkins	Jerkins; S. Garrett	4:06
14.	"Why"	S. Garrett; Robert Gerongco; Samuel Gerongco	Brass 'n Blues; S. Garrett	3:49
15.	"One Day"	S. Garrett; B. Avila; I. Avila; Juan Najera	The Avila Brothers; S. Garrett	3:43
Total length:				52:06

Notes

- ^{^a} denotes co-producer(s)
- ^{^b} denotes additional producer(s)

== Charts ==
Chart performance for Turbo 919
Chart (2007)	Peak position
Japanese Albums (Oricon)	12

== Release history ==
Release dates and formats for Turbo 919
Region	Date	Label(s)	Format(s)	Ref.
United States	28 August 2007	Interscope	CD; digital download	
Japan	28 November 2007	Universal Japan	CD; digital download	
Australia	4 December 2007	Universal Australia	CD; digital download	
