= Scared of Beautiful =

Song by Brandy

from the album Two Eleven
- Recorded: 2012
- Studio: Larrabee Sound (North Hollywood)
- Length: 3:46
- Label: Chameleon; RCA
- Songwriters: Warryn Campbell; Frank Ocean; Breyon Prescott
- Producers: Warryn Campbell; Breyon Prescott

"Scared of Beautiful" is a song by American singer Brandy Norwood from her sixth studio album, Two Eleven (2012). It was written by Frank Ocean, Warryn Campbell and Breyon Prescott while production was handled by Campbell and Prescott. Not specifically written for Norwood, the song was one out of several songs Ocean crafted with production duo Midi Mafia. It was later submitted to her team, with whom she recorded a new version with a widely different instrumental for her album, consisting essentially of synthesizers and electric guitars. A mid-tempo R&B ballad, "Scared of Beautiful" finds Norwood, as the protagonist, thinking about self and self-growth and being fearless.

Considered by Norwood as one of her favorites, the song was originally conceived as a duet between Norwood and Ocean, but required last-minute recording sessions with Ocean failed to materialize prior to the album's release. "Scared of Beautiful" was generally well received by music critics who complimented its production as well as Ocean's aurally remarkable influence. Some of them also described the song as a "frantic" ballad and called it the highlight of the record. Following the release of Two Eleven, "Scared of Beautiful" charted at number 48 on the South Korean International Singles Chart, based on downloads alone. The song was part of Norwood' set list at a spot date in Rams Head Live!, held in Baltimore, Maryland in November 2011.

== Background and recording ==
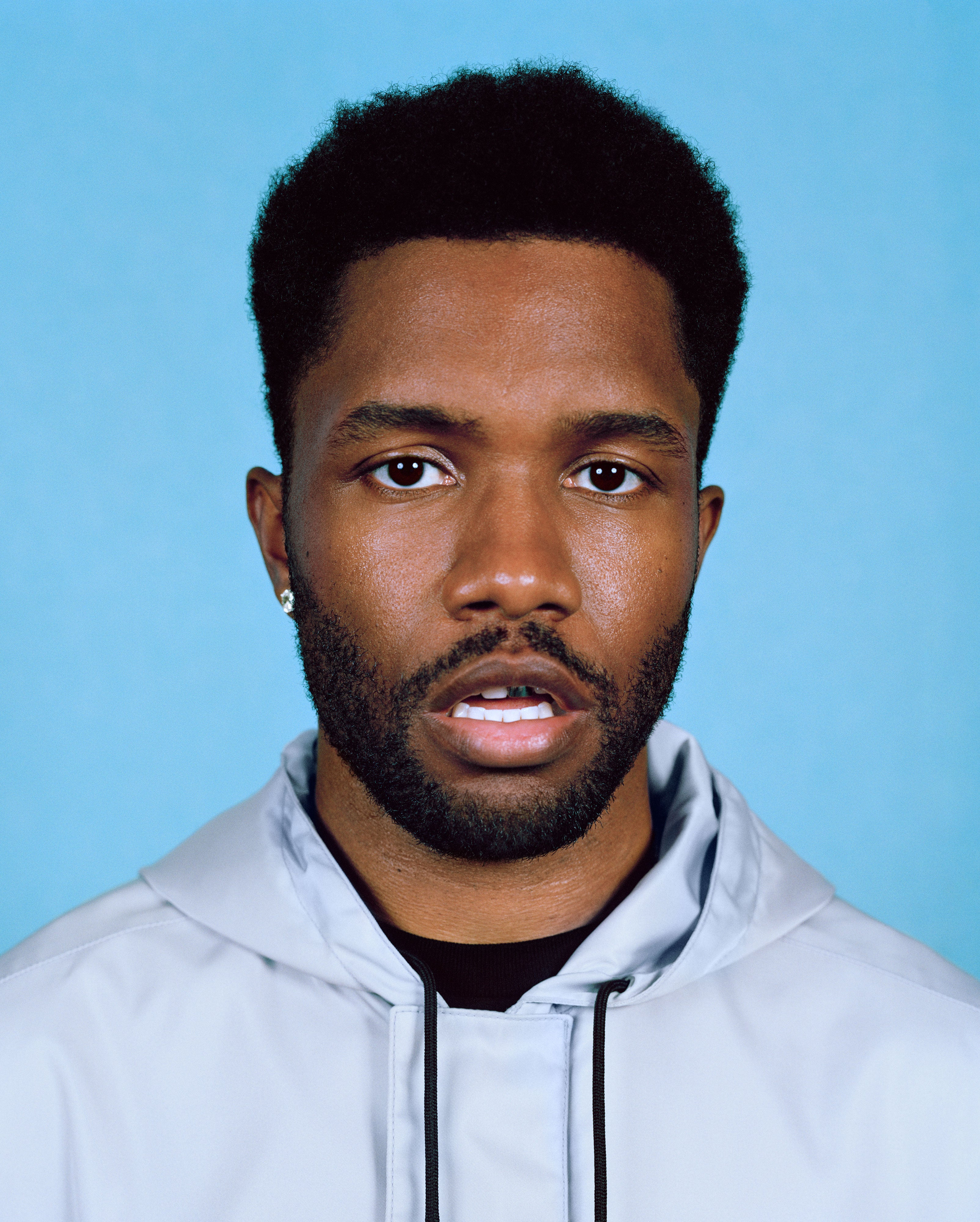
Frank Ocean (pictured) wrote "Scared of Beautiful".

"Scared of Beautiful" was written by Odd Future collective member Frank Ocean along with producer Warryn Campbell, and Chameleon Records head Breyon Prescott. Jaycen Joshua mixed the track, while Trehy Harris assisted in the audio engineering of it; both tasks were executed at the Larrabee Sound Studios, in North Hollywood, California. In early March 2012, Norwood made known that Ocean would contribute to her then upcoming sixth studio album, Two Eleven. He previously wrote the songs "1st & Love" and "Locket (Locked in Love)" for her 2008 album Human, a process which resulted in a close friendship between the singers. Though Ocean didn't write "Scared of Beautiful" specifically for her, Norwood stated that she was owning it now: “It’s on my album, I got a claim... ’Frank Ocean, you wrote that song for me, you just didn’t know it’,” she joked. Ocean's demo of the track was leaked in late 2011. Crafted by Midi Mafia members Waynne Nugent and Kevin Risto along with songwriters Tim Stewart and Lamont Neuble, it features a significantly different, guitar-driven instrumentalization. Campbell, unaware of Ocean's version, produced his own variation of "Scared of Beautiful" with help from Prescott along Norwood's pre-recorded vocals only.

On Two Eleven, the song was originally conceived as a duet between Norwood and Ocean, and was expected to feature the duo exchanging lyrics about looking forwards and not backwards, with lines such as "I wonder why there's no mirrors on these walls no more/ You can't tell me why you're so terrified of beautiful". However the final version features just Norwood. Speaking on how the song came about Norwood said, "Well, he had the song for a while and when I heard it, it really just spoke to me. Sometimes you get to a point in your life where you’re scared to be great, you’re scared to be beautiful, you’re scared to be the best version of you and you talk to yourself and you try to get yourself back on track. I just remember feeling like that at a point in my life. I know there are so many people out there that go through that dark time and I felt like it could speak to a lot of people." One of her favorites songs on the album, Norwood remarked that she calls "Scared of Beautiful" her "The Greatest Love of All," referring to Whitney Houston’s 1986 classic. In April 2012, Midi Mafia's Kevin Risto claimed that the song had been recorded by several other singers, including Beyoncé Knowles and Rihanna, but "for some reason, it just didn’t end up anybody’s album."

== Critical reception ==
Andrew Hampp of Billboard felt that while "Scared of Beautiful" featured "some of the album's most clichéd lyrics ("scared of the dark / more than the light," a "mirror, mirror" interlude on the bridge)", Norwood would turn them "into an emotional breakthrough that references the singer's battle with eating disorders over the years". He concluded that "it all culminates in a wrenching conclusion that finds Brandy confessing with an onest vocal that recalls Ocean's own "Bad Religion" from this summer's breakthrough Channel Orange." FACT called the track "a highlight" on Two Eleven and wrote "The production by Warryn Campbell is sublime, the moment when the guitar comes in over those filtered 808s sending particular shivers down FACT’s collective spine right now. Angie Writes of Soul Culture who stated that "Without You” felt "frantic", came to the conclusion that on "Without You" and "Scared of Beautiful" Norwood was "100% authentic." She commented that the song was "tailor made for Brandy and the legions of fans who connected with her transparency. A lavish confrontation, “Scared of Beautiful” reflects Brandy's internal struggle over the years, both professionally and personally to feel “good enough.” Fiercely introspective this gem pushes us toward accepting the best of ourselves."

Mikael Wood of Los Angeles Times commented that "Brandy picked some capable – and unexpected – collaborators to help her [to get back on the right track], including Frank Ocean, who co-wrote the very Frank Ocean-ish "Scared of Beautiful." Melinda Newman from HitFix called the song "one of the album’s most poignant songs." Ken Capobianco from Boston Globe found that "the version of Frank Ocean’s keenly observed, honest “Scared of Beautiful” is among her finest moments ever." He concluded that track, along with “Wish Your Love Away,” show "how important good material is to her success. With her producers subtly augmenting her vocals with lush harmonies, Brandy executes these songs with confidence." By contrast, Andrew Chan of Slant Magazine was mixed, writing that "melodically the song is an Ocean throwaway, but the schizophrenic lyrics allow Brandy to test out her gift as a storyteller—something that didn't come naturally to her in the sometimes unconvincing performances of her youth." He felt that on the track "Brandy's left no room to ululate, leashing herself to the bottom of her range all the better to goad her mirror image into self-affirmation." Elliot Robinson, writing for So So Gay, declared "Scared of Beautiful" a "smouldering track, but also a little meandering and forgettable, featuring a theme in the same territory as the monster Christina Aguilera hit, "Beautiful"." Both Rap-Up and USA Today ranked the song among their favorite tracks on the album alongside "Wildest Dreams", “No Such Thing As Too Late” and “Let Me Go.”

== Credits and personnel ==
Credits adapted from the liner notes of Two Eleven.

- Songwriting – Warryn Campbell, Frank Ocean, Breyon Prescott
- Production – Warryn Campbell
- Co–production – Breyon Prescott for Chameleon Entertainment
- Mixing – Jaycen Joshua
- Mixing assistance – Trehy Harris
- Mastering – Dave Kutch

== Charts ==
For the week ending October 27, 2012, "Scared of Beautiful" debuted at number 48 on the South Korean International Singles Chart, eventually selling 7,100 digital downloads within two weeks.

Weekly chart performance for "Scared of Beautiful"
Chart (2012)	Peak position
South Korea International(Gaon Chart)	48
