= Get It All =

Single by Sean Garrett featuring Nicki Minaj

from the album The Inkwell
- Released: March 9, 2010
- Length: 4:07
- Label: Bet I Penned It
- Songwriters: Garrett Hamler; Onika Maraj
- Producers: Sean Garrett; Bangladesh

Sean Garrett singles chronology
| "Break Up" (2010) | "Get It All" (2010) | "Massive Attack" (2010) |

Nicki Minaj singles chronology
| "Lil Freak" (2010) | "Get It All" (2010) | "Roger That" (2010) |

"Get It All" is a song by American singer Sean Garrett featuring rapper Nicki Minaj. It was released as the lead single from Garrett's debut mixtape The Inkwell.

== Background ==
In an interview with Seattle Post-Intelligencer Garrett discussed the song and Minaj's contribution to the song.

"I played Nicki a couple of records off my album, and there was one that I wanted her to get on. She heard ‘Get It All’ and went crazy, like, ‘I was thinking I want to get on that,’ and I was thinking the same thing! She really delivered big for me, and in turn, I started playing her some other records. I played her this one that I thought could be huge for her, and that record was ‘Massive Attack.’ I played it again, and she said, ‘That’s the direction that I want my album to be in.’”

"'Get It All' relates to me starting when I was in sixth grade. The verse is, ‘She caught my face like a Kodak that couldn’t shake the weather/The storm had nothin’ on this chick named Heather/Damn, every time I seen her, it was just after a break-up/But you know niggas and girls, how they quit and they make up.’ Then, I’m in college, in a relationship with my girlfriend, when I see a girl that I knew back in sixth grade that wasn’t so hot to me then. But now, she’s incredible. She’s telling me that the girl that I’m with now ain’t good enough to be my girl. That’s relatable to everybody’s life, whether you’re rich, poor, black, white, Chinese — it doesn’t matter."

== Critical reception ==
Nathan S. of the DJ Booth gave the song a negative review stating "Garrett, whose songwriting skills are undeniable (see Mario’s Break Up), isn’t exactly displaying the full range of his production skills on Get It All - there’s a fine line between minimalistic and simplistic, and this feels like the former - and his vocal skills don’t exactly impress." and even commented on being overshadowed by Minaj on his own song.

== Music video ==
The video is directed by Gil Green. Garret filmed his scenes in March 2010 while Minaj filmed her scenes in April 2010.

The music video debuted on June 22, 2010. The video begins with Garrett playing the intro of "Feel Love" (featuring Drake, also off The Inkwell) as if it was a school assignment and begins Get It All once his love interest walks in. The entire video is cut and spliced to fit the piano beats of the song. Throughout the video Garrett shows a timeline with his love interest from when he was in junior-high where he has a younger boy play him and then is shown in current day wearing the same clothes. While in the schools gymnasium, Tyga makes a cameo and appears behind Garrett in the bleachers while Minaj walks in and raps her verse. After Minaj's verse, Garrett is shown singing on top of a stage and with his love interest leaning on his car. As the video continues, clips of the entire music video are shown until the end.

== Charts ==
| Chart (2010) | Peak position |
|---|---|
| US Billboard Hot R&B/Hip-Hop Songs | 83 |
