= Two Eleven =

- Standard edition cover

Studio album by Brandy
- Released: October 16, 2012
- Studios: Atlantic (Los Angeles); Chalice (Los Angeles); Unsung (Los Angeles); Westlake (Los Angeles); Hit Factory Criteria (Miami); Circle House (Miami); Doppler (Atlanta); Zac (Atlanta); KMA (New York City)
- Genre: R&B
- Length: 47:55
- Labels: Chameleon; RCA
- Producers: Bangladesh; Bink; The Bizness; Warryn Campbell; Mike City; Danja; Earl & E.; Sean Garrett; Danny Morris; Jim Jonsin; Rico Love; Pierre Medor; Harmony "H-Money" Samuels; Switch; Mike Will Made It; Mario Winans

Brandy chronology
Human (2008)	Two Eleven (2012)	B7 (2020)

Singles from Two Eleven
- 1. "Put It Down" Released: May 4, 2012; 2. "Wildest Dreams" Released: August 28, 2012

Two Eleven is the sixth studio album by American singer Brandy. Initially released in Spain on October 12, 2012, and released in the US on October 16, 2012, it served as the singer's debut release with Chameleon Entertainment and RCA Records after departing from Epic Records soon after releasing her previous album, Human (2008). The album's title is taken from Norwood's birthday; it is also the day on which her idol and friend, entertainer Whitney Houston died eight months before Two Eleven's release.

Two Eleven is the first album from Norwood to include a diverse roster of collaborators, including songwriting credits from Frank Ocean, Chris Brown and Sean Garrett. Production comes courtesy of the likes of Bangladesh and Rico Love, amongst others. Upon its release, the album received critical acclaim, with many complimenting Norwood's vocals, the album's production and the overall direction. Two Eleven debuted at number two on the US Billboard 200 with first-week sales of 65,000 copies, becoming Norwood's fourth top-ten album and her first in eight years. It also debuted atop the Top R&B/Hip-Hop Albums chart, her second album to do so.

The album produced two singles. "Put It Down", featuring Chris Brown, was released in May 2012. It peaked within the top five on the US Hot R&B/Hip-Hop Songs, becoming Norwood's tenth top-ten single on the chart and her first in a decade. It peaked at number 65 on the Billboard Hot 100. "Wildest Dreams" was released as the second and final single in August 2012, failing to enter the Billboard Hot 100 and peaking at number 68 on the Hot R&B/Hip-Hop Songs.

== Background and development ==
Two Eleven is Norwood's sixth studio album and follow-up to one of her least commercially-successful releases, Human (2008), and 2005's greatest hits album The Best of Brandy, both of which missed the US Billboard 200 album charts top-ten. Norwood began conceiving Two Eleven in the week Human was released, in December 2008. Human, was originally scheduled to be released in November but was delayed to accommodate last-minute recording sessions with American producer and close friend of Norwood, Timbaland. The records produced were ultimately omitted from Human's track listing due to Timabaland not being able to get his trademark vocals on the songs. As a consequence, Norwood stated in an interview with Rap-Up magazine that she wanted Timbaland to be heavily involved in the next album, along with frequent collaborator Rodney "Darkchild" Jerkins, who had executively produced Human, expressing her wish of both musicians executive producing her next project together."

"I just know that it will be sooner rather than later [...] I'm just going to keep going until I can't go no more. I promise my fans that and I'm going to stick to my promise, because I know they've waited for years. They've stood by me for so long, so I can't and won't put them through that big of a wait again. And that's a promise."

— Norwood talking about the album's timeframe back when she was still with Epic Records.

Norwood began working on the album with her then-record label, Epic Records, to which she had signed in April 2008. Amongst those to record with the singer were songwriting and production partners Tricky Stewart and The-Dream. In early 2009, songwriter Amanda Ghost was appointed president of Epic Records, ultimately leading to speculation around the future of Norwood's record contract and its eventual termination as confirmed by Tricky Stewart. Soon after, it was reported that Norwood had been dropped by Jay-Z's management company Roc Nation, something which Norwood's team refuted in July 2009 by stating "They [Epic] have not dropped her. We are trying to get a release from them. We're in waiting" and that "Brandy and Roc Nation parted amicably".

Norwood's joint record deal with RCA and producer Breyon Prescott's Chameleon Records was finalized in late 2010, however, it was not announced to the public until August 2011, when it was also confirmed that Norwood's sixth studio album would be released in 2012. After Norwood was signed in late 2010, professional recording and submissions for the album began. Much of the earlier material recorded under Epic Records was left with the label and allocated to other artists such as Jennifer Lopez. Speaking of her new record deal during an interview with Rolling Stone magazine, Norwood commented: "I'm reinventing myself and I feel fearless, [Two Eleven is] mature, it's gritty, it's edgy. RCA reminds me of how Atlantic used to be, they really believed in my vision as an artist when they signed me at 14, RCA welcomed me and Breyon Prescott and Peter Edge showed such passion for what I wanted to do". Before Prescott worked with Norwood he sought the permission of the singer's long-time collaborator and friend Darkchild. Prescott told Darkchild that he wanted to work on making an R&B record with Norwood. Darkchild agreed giving him his blessings.

In 2009, Norwood introduced her rap alter ego Bran'Nu on Timbaland's album Shock Value II (2009), the result of artistic experimentation with the musician, who had tapped her for her rhyming ability after seeing a video on YouTube that Norwood had uploaded and showed her rapping freestyle. Norwood, who had initially thought of rapping as a hobby and fun for friends, felt encouraged by Timbaland to write and perform her own verses on at least three tracks for his album, two of which eventually made it to the track lisiting. In December 2009, the producer revealed his intentions to reteam with her on her next project, producing the bulk of an album that he envisioned to be "half singing, half rapping". Norwood confirmed his idea in an interview she held at the release party of Shock Value II: "What I'm doing on the [next] album is a little bit different than what everybody knows me for. Timbaland endorsed that [...] He really gave me a shot to be different and be versatile. I can't thank him enough for that. This is a wonderful opportunity." Though Norwood went on to record several other rap songs the following months and hoped it would eventually lead to a signing with Timbaland's Mosley Music Group, plans for hip hop-oriented album under his imprint were eventually abandoned as the singer felt the sound would not aim at her core audience. Approached on the subject, she later dismissed the idea of recording a rap album, stating that "it was a hobby. I was convinced to do it professionally, which I never should have listened to that advice."

"With this album, I wanted it to be as honest and as real as possible [...] I wanted my album to represent honesty and clarity and struggle and pain, as well as love, with a different sound and a different edge. It's definitely R&B, but it has the crossover appeal. Not just R&B, but pop and hip-hop. I wanted everyone to have something that they can listen to on this album [...]."

— Norwood discussing her intention with Two Eleven in YRB magazine.

After unveiling her new record deal in August 2011, Norwood finally revealed that she had found her sound for Two Eleven, stating: "What I'm truly excited about is how the album is all about R&B and figuring out the new sound of R&B, and that was the challenge for me. I wanted to do something different – I didn't want to just sing about love over regular beats". Norwood also stated how Frank Ocean inspired her on this album: "We've always had that great chemistry, and we both understand music in the same ways, to work with him on this album was great as well, and I hope I can get in [the studio] with him some more because his music is just so moving; I'm inspired by him. I think he's a great artist and he hasn't even touched on what he will touch on in the future".

Speaking to Billboard magazine she said "I think the fans have been very patient with me, but I just wanted to make sure that this album was right – the right type of music, the right core. I feel like we're getting to that point where I felt comfortable with putting something out." Speaking of the types of records she was making, in a separate interview with Rap-Up, Norwood compared her album to previous records. "It's just gonna be a different album, but of course expressing the love that I feel now and the struggles and different situations that I've gone through in the past,... My music always tends to be the soundtrack to my life and definitely inspired by what I see other people go through as well—gritty, edgy, different." Then touching the subject matter of songs on the album, Norwood said she felt like the past failures in her life should be addressed,

"The evolution of Brandy is crazy, i've gone through some things that I haven't yet sang about....From the break up with my ex-fiance, to the struggles since the car accident, and then Human not performing well at all, and then to being cheated out of Dancing with the Stars; it's like failure after failure after failure......I'm bringing everything i got. Everything I have to this project. I honestly feel like and i'm not trying to get emotional but i really feel like this is my last chance....This is time away from my daughter."

== Recording and production ==
Norwood began recording the album in early 2009 with her then-record label Epic Records. Among those to first work with the singer were Ne-Yo, Stargate, and production and songwriting duo Tricky Stewart and The-Dream. The duo produced the record "Louboutins" for Norwood but after losing her record deal it was re-recorded by actress and singer Jennifer Lopez for her album Love? (2011). Another record which Norwood recorded under Epic was titled "Decisions", which was produced by Stargate and featured guest vocals from American R&B singer-songwriter Ne-Yo. The record was reclaimed and eventually recorded by upcoming girl group RichGirl for their debut mixtape Fall in Love with RichGirl (2011). By late 2009, the singer resumed recording, this time with a duo called The Chase (consisting of Kadis and Sean). In early 2010, Norwood stated that she wanted to work with will.i.am and Akon. Throughout 2010, Norwood continued recording independently with a variety of musicians, including producers Danja, Clinton Sparks, The Jam, Corey Gibson and songwriter Stacy Barthe. Some of this was chronicled on her VH1 reality series Brandy & Ray J: A Family Business, which originally aired from April 2010 to February 2011 and spawned a soundtrack of the same name (2011), on which some of the tracks were included.

During early conceptions of the album, Norwood had wanted to reunite with Rodney "Darkchild" Jerkins–her longtime collaborator who had executively produced Human (2008). However, midway through 2009, during an interview with Out magazine, Norwood refused to talk about Human, telling interviews "to hell with that album" when questions were asked about it. It wasn't until 2010 when Norwood would break her silence during an episode of her VH1 reality TV show Brandy and Ray J: A Family Business. During one of the episodes when her brother Ray J announces that he wants to work with Darkchild, Norwood reveals that she felt the producer "did not put his all into the album", and that "was a personal issue between me and him." Elaborating on what she meant, Norwood replied "You know what kind of chemistry Rodney and I have too, but on some personal issues, he doesn't deliver.....I don't want the same thing that happened to me, to happen to you.".

In September 2010, producer Bangladesh confirmed that he had been commissioned by Norwood to helm the production of the entire project, though Norwood later expressed her intent to further connect with several producers, including Jim Beanz, WyldCard, newcomer Kevin McCall, Lonny Bereal, Rico Love, production collectives The Woodworks and The Runners, and singer Sean Garrett who worked on nine songs for the album. Hit-Boy who had previously worked with Frank Ocean on Norwood's Human album returned to production on Two Eleven with the ballad "White Flag", which discusses "emotional defeat". However it was excluded from the final track listing. Norwood's collaboration with Drake was a song written by James Fauntleroy and produced by Noah "40" Shebib; however it failed to come to fruition. A press release from RCA Records announced that Breyon Prescott was overseeing the album with productions by the aforementioned producers as well as Mario Winans and writing from Ester Dean. Despite Prescott stating that Timbaland was in the studios crafting a song for the album, Norwood revealed on August 29, 2012, that the album was complete and that time didn't allow for her and the producer to work together.

== Music and lyrics ==
During the album's listening party on August 20, 2012, at Germano Studios in Manhattan, New York, Two Eleven's executive producer Breyon Prescott revealed that there would be fifteen songs on the final track listing. Eleven of the songs were previewed at the album party but not all were completely mixed, mastered or finished. The album's first single "Put It Down" featuring Chris Brown has a distinctly hip-hop flavour, with Norwood taking on her "rap-singing" vocal performance she last used when assuming her persona of Bran'Nu on Timbaland's album Shock Value II (2009). The song is built around a "mid-tempo thumping production" courtesy of Bangladesh. Its co-writer and co-producer Sean Garrett revealed that "Put It Down" was a "good segway" to what the rest of the album would sound like. By contrast not all of Garrett's songs follow the same flow. The album's second single, titled "Wildest Dreams", was also written by Garrett, but this time produced by The Bizzness. An introspective ballad, "Wildest Dreams" speaks about Norwood's losing out emotionally. Lyrics include the line "Never in my wildest dreams did I think someone could care 'bout me/ Not just the way you love me, but you know I'm emotional (sometimes)." During the course of the song, Norwood mentions herself several times, over the "thawacking percussion" and production.

Prescott stated that on Two Eleven, Norwood's vocals return to a multi-layered style like those present on previous songs "Angel in Disguise", "Full Moon" and "Afrodisiac". These are present on another ballad on Two Eleven called "Without You", which was originally crafted for singer Alicia Keys. Initially tipped by Norwood as an early contender for the second or third single, Billboard's Andrew Hamp said "Without You" showcases Norwood's "strong vocals" with a "confident" attitude. It drew comparisons to "Enough of No Love" by Keyshia Cole, both Cole's song and Norwood's song were produced by Harmony Samuels. Touching on similar subject, "No Such Thing As too Late" sees Norwood talking about the emotions of a new relationship. Lyrics include the line "When you really love somebody / you can wait / 'cause there's no such thing as too late." This goes hand-in-hand with another song "Hardly Breathing", where Norwood speaks of the anguish of having her partner leave. Both of the songs were written and produced by Jim Jonsin and Rico Love.

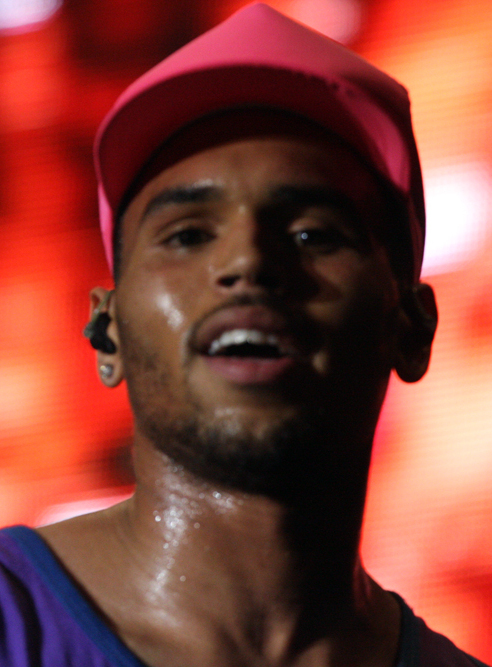
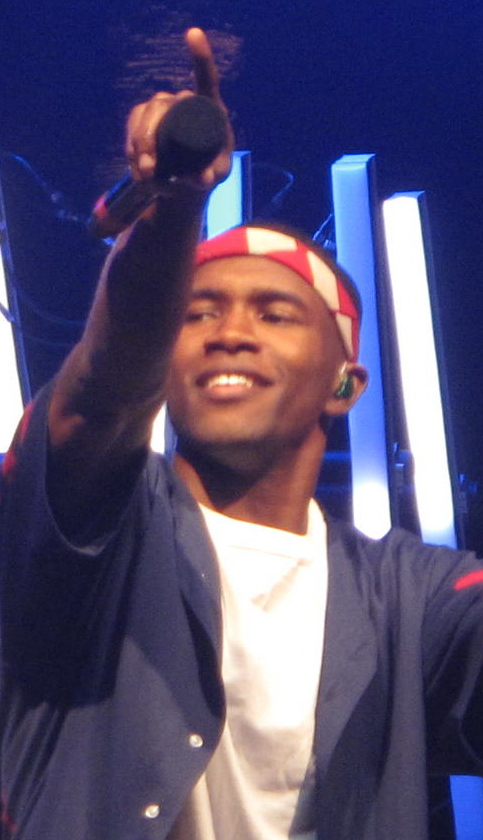
American R&B singers Chris Brown (left) and Frank Ocean (right) both contributed to Two Eleven. Brown is also featured on first single "Put It Down".

R&B singer-songwriter Frank Ocean wrote the ballad "Scared of Beautiful" for the album. Ocean previously co-wrote "1st & Love" and "Locket (Locked in Love)" with Rich King for Norwood's Human (2008) album. "Scared of Beautiful" was originally conceived as a duet between Norwood and Ocean, and features the duo exchanging lyrics about looking forwards and not backwards, with lines such as "I wonder why there's no mirrors on these walls no more/ You can't tell me why you're so terrified of beautiful". However the final version features just Norwood. Speaking on how the song came about Norwood said, "Well, he had the song for a while and when I heard it, it really just spoke to me. Sometimes you get to a point in your life where you're scared to be great, you're scared to be beautiful, you're scared to be the best version of you and you talk to yourself and you try to get yourself back on track. I just remember feeling like that at a point in my life. I know there are so many people out there that go through that dark time and I felt like it could speak to a lot of people."

Singer turned producer Mario Winans, wrote and produced a song for the album called "Wish Your Love Away" where Norwood sings with angst for her lover "who played her like a fool". Centred around a melody of "serrated drums" and a "piping" pan flute Norwood singles "Remember that you told me you were with it, and all them other bitches you could do without." "Do You Know What You Have?", helmed by Mike WiLL Made It, switches direction, with Norwood firing back at her love. In the lyrics she "cuts down her man for failing to return her affections." The subject content changes slightly on the Bangladesh-helmed "So Sick", another record which was written by Garrett. On the song, Norwood addresses a lover who pushes her too far and "violating her trust", it includes the lyrics "How far do you think I'll let you push me before I cross the line?".

Not all of the songs are mid-tempo or ballads, Bangladesh also produced a song called "Let Me Go" which Hammp described as an "up-tempo club song". On the chorus, Norwood sings "You know how I get when you let me go", and later in the song she makes reference to Twitter and her mother. The song interpolates "Tonight" by Swedish pop singer Lykke Li. Deluxe edition bonus track "Can You Hear Me Now?", producer Danja's sole contribution on Two Eleven, works up an extended musical foreplay around a single mind-numbing groove. Built around an instrumental that was originally produced for Diddy – Dirty Money's 2010 album Last Train to Paris, it was re-constructed by Love for Norwood. Danja used heavy vocoding during production of the song.

== Title and artwork ==
The album's title, Two Eleven, is a reference to both Norwood's birthday and the day her idol and mentor, entertainer Whitney Houston, died in 2012. Norwood declared selecting a title a "tough decision". About the title, she stated: "Some of the titles I was working with were Rebirth, Reincarnation, Reinvention, Resurrection [...] I just felt like Two Eleven describes all of that. It's the day I was born, and each year, I evolve and change with time. It also has a whole new meaning to it because I gained my angel. My icon is my angel now. It's all tied in there and I just think it best represents who I am and the responsibilities I have moving on." Dismissing ongoing reproaches, that she was "trying to use the passing of Whitney Houston to sell records", Norwood remarked that the title was nothing but a homage: "I need for everybody to know that, if it wasn't for Whitney Houston, there would be no me, because she was the possibility for me. She was the vision of my dreams actually coming true, and she meant everything to me." The album's cover artwork, photographed by Gomillion & Leupold, was revealed on August 29, 2012. The deluxe edition's cover is entirely identical to the standard edition's but is tinged yellow.

== Release and promotion ==
Initially, the album was due to be released in March 2012 according to Billboard. In November 2011, Sean Garrett announced through Rap-Up that he wrote and co-produced the album's first single, which he expected to be released before December 25, 2011, and was to feature a rapper. Plans fell through and the song was eventually pushed back to avoid clashing with the release of Norwood's collaboration with former rival Monica, the song "It All Belongs to Me", taken from Monica's 2012 album New Life. Following the delays in the release of "Put it Down", May 2012 was announced as a second release date. In March 2012, Norwood revealed the album's title as Two Eleven and announced that the album would arrive in June; it went on to be postponed to August 28, then to October 2, and then finally to October 15.

On July 18, Norwood performed "Put It Down" for the first time at the Howard Theatre in Washington, D.C. The first televised performance of the song occurred at the MDA Show of Strength benefit concert, which aired on September 2. In October, Norwood performed the song on television shows 106 & Park, Good Morning America and Live with Kelly and Michael. Norwood performed the song, along with the album's second single "Wildest Dreams", at the Dick Clark's New Year's Rockin' Eve special on January 1, 2013, being the only R&B performer at the event. In February, Norwood performed "Without You"–originally scheduled for release as the album's third single–at The BET Honors.

== Singles ==
On April 12, 2012, Norwood confirmed she was going to release "Put It Down", featuring fellow R&B singer Chris Brown, as the album's lead single. Produced by Bangladesh, Norwood described the song as "very commercial, but at the same time, it's got a dope hip-hop influence—it's club, it's radio, it's all formats [...] it's uptempo, it's really different." The song premiered on April 26, 2012, and was made available for purchase as a digital download on May 4, 2012. "Put It Down" first entered the US Hot R&B/Hip-Hop Songs at number 98 and eventually peaked at number three, marking Norwood's highest-charting entry since "What About Us?", the lead single from her third studio album Full Moon (2002), had peaked at number two a decade before. "Put It Down" also reached number 65 on the US Billboard Hot 100.

In July 2012, during an interview with Angie Ange on 93.9 WKYS radio, Norwood said that two songs were in contention to become the second single. While Norwood favored "Without You", Chameleon and RCA wanted to release the Sean Garrett-produced "So Sick" first and then service "Without You" as the third single from Two Eleven. However, at an album listening party at Germano Studios in Manhattan, it was revealed that The Bizness-produced "Wildest Dreams" would serve as the album's second single. "Wildest Dreams" premiered online on August 21, 2012, and was released for digital download on August 28, 2012. Serviced to urban adult contemporary radio stations on September 11, 2012, it peaked at number 68 on the US Hot R&B/Hip-Hop Songs chart and was seen as a commercial failure compared to "Put It Down".

In an interview with Rap-Up, Norwood stated that she would like the third single to be the Rico Love and Jim Jonsin-helmed "No Such Thing as Too Late". Garrett also tipped a song he produced, "Let Me Go", for the album's third single release. However, during The BET Honors in February 2013, "Without You" was introduced as Norwood's new single and she performed the song live for the first time. It remained unreleased, however. After the release of Two Eleven, urban contemporary radio stations began playing "Do You Know What You Have?" and "Wish Your Love Away", which resulted in them peaking at numbers 61 and 66 on the US Hot R&B/Hip-Hop Airplay chart, respectively. "Scared of Beautiful" also charted at number 48 on the South Korean International Singles Chart, based on downloads alone.

== Critical reception ==
Professional ratings
Aggregate scores
Source	Rating
Metacritic	77/100
Review scores
Source	Rating
About.com	3.5/5 stars
AllMusic	4/5 stars
Entertainment Weekly	B+
Exclaim!	7/10
Now	3/5 Ns
People	3.5/4 stars
Slant Magazine	3.5/5 stars
USA Today	3/4 stars

Two Eleven became Norwood's most critically acclaimed album at the time of its release. At Metacritic, which assigns a rated mean out of 100 from mainstream critics, the album received a score of 77, which indicates "generally favorable reviews". Andy Kellman of AllMusic wrote that Norwood "took something of a risk by breaking from her norm and working with numerous songwriters and producers" and remarked that the strategy "paid off." He found adding that "Brandy, a superior vocalist ignored or disregarded by many [...] released one of her best albums. She should not be taken for granted." Steve Jones, writing for USA Today, considered Two Eleven Norwood's "most impassioned album in years. Whether she's overjoyed with a new love or ready to be shut of an old one, her heart seems like an open book." Fekadu from San Francisco Chronicle stated, "Not many singers have released six consistently amazing albums. Brandy has. Her newest is a collection of R&B songs that are personal, flavored and fantastic. The album doesn't miss a beat, as Brandy's raspy-yet-earthy tone weaves into each song's beat nicely to create outstanding tracks that will have you listening again and again." People declared Two Eleven "her best work since 2004's career high Afrodisiac" and wrote, "full of subtle, sensual pleasures, the album unfolds at a slow-to-midtempo pace and stays there for most of the time, even when incorporating hip-hop or electronica beats."

Andrew Chan from Slant Magazine commented that while Two Eleven was "touted as progressive R&B, it doesn't exactly redefine the singer as a visionary. What's refreshing about this new work, though, is how it clears a place for her in the realm of forward-thinking urban music while also reaching back to clarify her distinctive position in the diva pantheon." He called the record "the clearest portrait yet of Brandy's instrument", praising the "unusual tone [of her voice], its strange mix of warmth and cold, hard edges", and felt that the album revealed a "contradictory admiration for [...] Drake, Frank Ocean, and Kanye West circa 808s & Heartbreak". Ken Capobianco of The Boston Globe believed that with Two Eleven "Brandy delivers one of her better sets with these songs tracking love's mysterious ways [...] Unlike some past efforts, which sounded like musical wallpaper, there's swagger to the club tracks and real soul in the ballads." Andrew Hampp, writing for Billboard, felt that the album "features some of her freshest beats since 2004's experimental, critically adored Afrodisiac" and summed it as "a collection of old-school R&B songs with a modern, often futuristic twist with no trend-chasing experiments with EDM", calling it "her most focused album since 1998's Never Say Never".

Entertainment Weekly's Tanner Stransky called the album "a well-crafted for-the-fans album. Ignore what's pushed to pop radio. Brandy scores when her raspy-sweet voice soars during ballads and slow jams, and that's what stands out on this intimate, often ethereal collection." He gave the album a B+ rating. Sarah Godfrey from Washington Post complimented the songs on the album and wrote that the album "serves as a fine tribute [to friend and mentor Whitney Houston], in part because it is a testament to the fact that, despite whatever trends are happening in popular music right now, a good voice always shines through." Vibe noted that "experimentation can spell struggle for some artists, but Two Eleven finds Brandy cruising fluidly past the predictable. Swinging from OVO-worthy emo-ethereal reflections to quirky up-tempos, the 18-year vet deviates from overdone slow-tempo production." Rich Juzwiak from Gawker felt that Two Eleven "doesn't sound any younger or older than Brandy is. It's not obtusely hip or desperately serious. It just is, it's just now and it's just right." Less enthusiastic with the album, Noah Berlatsky from The Atlantic felt the songs on the album were "worse than the largely ignored Human, but better than the beloved-yet-boring 2002 Full Moon", and added, that "but such parsing seems mostly beside the point. If you're one of the dwindling number of fans of this '90s style, you know what you're getting; if not you'll probably skip it anyway."

== Accolades ==
Year	Award	Category	Nominee(s)	Result	Ref.
2013	Soul Train Music Award	Best Collaboration	"Put It Down"	Nominated	

=== Year-end lists ===
Year-end lists for Two Eleven
Publication	Accolade	Rank	Ref.
AllMusic	Favorite R&B Albums of 2012	—N/a	
Fact	100 Best Albums of the Decade So Far	48	
HotNewHipHop	Top R&B Albums of 2012	10	
Los Angeles Times	Best of 2012 Pop Music: Albums	5	

=== Decade-end lists ===
Decade-end lists for Two Eleven
Publication	Accolade	Rank	Ref.
Beats Per Minute	Top 50 Albums of the 2010s	49	

== Commercial performance ==
Two Eleven debuted at number three on the US Billboard 200 and atop the Top R&B/Hip-Hop Albums chart, with first-week sales of 65,000 copies—less than Norwood's previous effort Human (2008), which had first-week sales of 73,000 copies. However, this marked her fourth top-ten album on the Billboard 200, as well as her second number-one album on the Top R&B/Hip-Hop Albums chart, following her third studio album Full Moon (2002). In its second week, the album sold additional 22,000 copies, falling to number ten on the Billboard 200. By November 2012, Two Eleven had sold 110,700 copies in the United States, and went on to finish 52nd on Billboard's 2012 Top R&B/Hip-Hop Albums year-end chart. In October 2013, Sister 2 Sister magazine confirmed that the album had "sold around 180,000 copies."

== Track listing ==
Two Eleven – Standard edition
No.	Title	Writer(s)	Producer(s)	Length
1.	"Intro"	Roosevelt Harrell III	Bink	0:57
2.	"Wildest Dreams"	Sean Garrett; Justin Henderson; Christoper Whitacre	The Bizness; Garrett	4:25
3.	"So Sick"	Garrett; Shondrae Crawford	Mr. Bangladesh; Garrett	4:31
4.	"Slower"	Chris Brown; Brandy Norwood; Breyon Prescott; Amber Streeter; Dave Taylor	Switch	2:57
5.	"No Such Thing as Too Late"	Rico Love; Jim Jonsin; Danny Morris	Jonsin; Love; Mr. Morris	4:01
6.	"Let Me Go"	Crawford; Garrett; Lykke Zachrisson; Björn Yttling	Mr. Bangladesh; Garrett	3:17
7.	"Without You"	Eric Bellinger; Courtney Harrell; Norwood; Prescott; Harmony Samuels	Samuels	4:12
8.	"Put It Down" (featuring Chris Brown)	Dwayne Abernathy; Brown; Crawford; Garrett	Mr. Bangladesh; Garrett; Dem Jointz^{[a]}	4:06
9.	"Hardly Breathing"	Love; Pierre Medor	Love; Medor	3:55
10.	"Do You Know What You Have?"	Garrett; Norwood; Prescott; Pierre Slaughter; Michael Williams II	Mike Will Made It; P-Nasty^{[a]}	3:28
11.	"Scared of Beautiful"	Christopher Breaux; Warryn Campbell; Prescott	Campbell; Prescott^{[a]}	3:46
12.	"Wish Your Love Away"	Brandon Johnson; Tiyon "TC" Mack; Ryuichi Sakamoto; Mario Winans	Winans; Johnson^{[a]}	3:19
13.	"Paint This House"	Love; Eric Goody II; Earl Hood; Medor	Love; Earl & E; Medor	3:59
14.	"Outro"	Harrell III	Bink	0:57
Total length:				47:55

Two Eleven – Deluxe edition
No.	Title	Writer(s)	Producer(s)	Length
14.	"Can You Hear Me Now?"	Love; Nathaniel Hills	Danja; Love	5:00
15.	"Music"	Mike Flowers; Prescott	Mike City	4:19
16.	"What You Need"	Crawford; Garrett	Mr. Bangladesh; Garrett	3:08
17.	"Outro"	Harrell III	Bink	0:57
Total length:				60:22

Notes

- ^{^[a]} denotes co-producer

Sample credits

- "Slower" contains a sample from "Fluorescences" as performed by Anglo-French pop band Stereolab.
- "Let Me Go" interpolates "Tonight" as performed by Swedish singer Lykke Li.
- "Wish Your Love Away" contains a sample from "Seven Samurai: Ending Theme" as performed by Japanese composer Ryuichi Sakamoto.

== Personnel ==
Credits adapted from the liner notes of Two Eleven.

- Dwayne "Dem Jointz" Abernathy Jr. – backing vocals, programming
- Tony Aliperti – guitar
- Diego Avendaño – assistant
- Chris Brown – vocals
- Nathan Burgess – assistant
- Warryn Campbell – producer
- Shondrae "Mr. Bangladesh" Crawford – producer
- Sheika Daily – make-up, hair styling
- Alex Dilliplane – assistant
- Peter Edge – executive producer
- Sean Garrett – producer
- Conrad Golding – producer
- Gomillion & Leupold – photography
- Erwin Gorostiza – creative director
- Eric Goudy II – keyboard, programming
- Francis Graham – engineer
- Trehy Harris – assistant
- Earl Hood – keyboard, programming
- Matt Huber – assistant
- Brandon James – instrumentation
- Brandon Ramon Johnson – producer
- Jim Jonsin – producer, programming
- Jaycen Joshua – mixing
- Kimberly Kimble – hair styling
- Carlos King – engineer
- Dave Kitch – mastering
- Rico Love – backing vocals, producer
- Fabian Marasciullo – mixing
- Robert Marks – mixing
- Nikolas Marzouca – engineer
- Thurston McCrea – engineering assistant
- Pierre Medor – engineer, producer, vocal engineer, keyboard, programming
- Mike "Snotty" Miller – engineer
- Danny Morris – keyboard
- Brandy Norwood – lead vocals, backing vocals, vocal producer, arranger, executive producer
- P-Nasty – producer
- Michael Piazza – engineer
- Breyon Prescott – producer, executive producer
- Ryan Ramsey – artist management
- Dana Richard – assistant
- Andy Rodriguez – assistant
- Frank Romano – guitar
- Harmony "H-Money" Samuels – producer, instrumentation
- Cody Sciara – assistant
- Jenke Ahmed Taily – creative director
- The Bizness – producer
- Ashley Sean Thomas – styling
- Mike Will – producer
- Mario Winans – producer, instrumentation

== Charts ==
=== Weekly charts ===
Weekly chart performance for Two Eleven
Chart (2012)	Peak position
French Albums (SNEP)	173
Japanese Albums (Oricon)	103
South Korean International Albums (Gaon)	13
UK Albums (Official Charts)	87
UK R&B Albums (Official Charts)	4
US Billboard 200	3
US Top R&B/Hip-Hop Albums (Billboard)	1

=== Year-end charts ===
2012 year-end chart performance for Two Eleven
Chart (2012)	Position
US Top R&B/Hip-Hop Albums (Billboard)	52

2013 year-end chart performance for Two Eleven
Chart (2013)	Position
US Top R&B/Hip-Hop Albums (Billboard)	70

== Release history ==
Release dates and formats for Two Eleven
Region	Date	Edition(s)	Format(s)	Label(s)	Ref.
Spain	October 12, 2012	Standard; deluxe	CD; digital download	Sony Music	
Switzerland	October 12, 2012	Standard; deluxe	CD; digital download	Sony Music	
France	October 15, 2012	Standard; deluxe	CD; digital download	Sony Music	
United Kingdom	October 15, 2012	Standard; deluxe	CD; digital download	RCA	
United States	October 16, 2012	Standard; deluxe	CD; digital download	Chameleon; RCA	
Australia	October 19, 2012	Standard; deluxe	CD; digital download	Sony Music	
Germany	October 19, 2012	Standard; deluxe	CD; digital download	Sony Music	
Japan	October 24, 2012	Standard; deluxe	CD; digital download	Sony Music	

== See also ==
- List of Billboard number-one R&B albums of 2012
