= Massive Attack (song) =

2010 single by Nicki Minaj

Single by Nicki Minaj featuring Sean Garrett
- Released: April 13, 2010
- Genre: Hip-hop; dance
- Length: 3:17
- Label: Young Money; Cash Money; Universal Motown
- Songwriters: Onika Maraj; Sean Garrett
- Producers: Alex da Kid; Sean Garret

Nicki Minaj singles chronology
"Roger That" (2010)	"Massive Attack" (2010)	"Woohoo" (2010)

Sean Garrett singles chronology
"Get It All" (2010)	"Massive Attack" (2010)	"Feel Love" (2011)

Music video
- "Massive Attack" on YouTube

"Massive Attack" is the debut solo single by Trinidadian rapper Nicki Minaj featuring American singer Sean Garrett. It was released on April 13, 2010 by Young Money, Cash Money and Universal Motown. It was written by Minaj and Garrett, and produced by Alex da Kid and Garrett. The song was sonically distinct from Minaj's previous work on her mixtapes and features and received mixed reviews from critics. It reached number 65 on the US Hot R&B/Hip-Hop Songs and number 22 on the Billboard Bubbling Under Hot 100 chart. The music video was released on March 31, and features a helicopter chase and militaristic jungle and desert scenes. The song is included in the 2011 rhythm video game, Dance Central 2.

== Background and release ==
In an interview with Rap-Up in March 2010, Minaj revealed the title to the song, and Garrett stated: "It's a club banger. It's a lot broader than what people would expect her to come with. The record puts her in the game in a way that says she should've been here a long time ago. She has a real way of how she wants to do this." Producer Alex da Kid said that Garrett sent Minaj the beat for the track and she loved it. Alex da Kid started working on the track while on a train and finished it in the studio.

In an interview with MTV News, Minaj stated that when she first heard the beat she "was in Africa being captivated by crazy drums", and "it sounds nothing like anything that's out right now." She called the song "next-level futuristic", and said that she chose Garrett to work with because he's one of the people that would understand her as an artist and translate that on a record. Garrett said he was "really excited about Nicki because I think that what Nicki has understood is that she can do whatever she wants to do ... she's very imaginative and her music's great and she's not scared of nothing." On the set of the video shoot for "Massive Attack", Minaj said that she was excited "for people to hear me ... doing more than one verse. ... I wanted to be theatrical, but I am very serious about what I do", and Garrett was "able to mesh that together and have a really fun but direct record". Also on the video set, Garrett said they wanted to contribute something that was "global", "urban" and "mainstream pop", so "that the world could get a chance to see her out on this pedestal." Alex da Kid said that a lot of artists wanted the beat, such as Jamie Foxx and Young Jeezy, but he gave it to Minaj because it fit her "quirky, left-field vibe." The song was initially thought to be Minaj's first single from her upcoming debut album, which she was working on and had no title or release date yet. However, it was not included on her album.

"Massive Attack" made its debut on March 29, 2010 on WQHT. It leaked onto the Internet on March 30, the day before its music video premiere on 106 & Park. The single's art cover was revealed on April 1, 2010, featuring a still of Minaj in the music video as a ninja and comic book font designs.

When asked about the song's commercial flop, Alex da Kid said that it comes with the territory when creating beats that are different to what is popular in the current musical landscape. "I don't want to do anything that's the same as what's out there, I think 'Massive Attack' may have been too different. If we would've put a big feature on it, like a Kanye or Rihanna or someone, I think it might've done a bit better. It needed something familiar about it." Garett said the song's lack of radio and chart success was "out of my control. I was only able to do as much as I was allowed to do. Sometimes you have to step back and get off the wheel. I didn't have control of the entire creative process. A lot of [other] artists trust me enough and allow me to do what I know is best to do as a producer."

== Music and lyrics ==
"Massive Attack"
"Massive Attack", influenced by "euro-club synths" saw a distinct style difference to Minaj's previous work.

The song fuses hip-hop and dance as Minaj delivers her lyrics in a Caribbean accent. It is composed in a "futuristic" style with heavy drum beats. It carries a "chaotic" beat with "screechy Euro-club synths" compared to Timbaland. Minaj references E.T. The Extra Terrestrial, Mr. Miyagi, The Phantom of the Opera, and Simba and Mufasa of The Lion King film in her lines.

== Critical reception ==
The song received mixed reviews from critics. Monica Herrera of Billboard described Minaj's "sassy one-liners" as "entertaining as always" but found "Massive Attack" to be an "anticlimactic coming out song" and the "chaotic beat" did not suit "her mental-patient delivery nearly as well as ... "BedRock"." Robbie Daw of Idolator said that Minaj came out of the gate "charging full force, lyrically, on her debut single. That said, we were expecting maybe a tad more of a melody on the track." Chris Ryan of MTV praised the rapper's "verbal dexterity, complex flow and humor" and stated that the song is "incredibly assured" for a new artist and "you get the feeling ... that [Minaj] really wants to separate herself from the rap pack and carve out a space all her own".

== Music video ==
Minaj leading her army of Harajuku barbies in the video

A music video for the single was shot on March 15, 2010 in the deserts of Lancaster, California, directed by Hype Williams. When talking to MTV News about the video Minaj stated,

"I didn't want to shoot the typical new-artist vision. Thank God I have a wonderful label that stands behind me and my vision. I met Hype in a freakin' airport...and it happened to be a week before I wanted to shoot a video. I told him the idea. Of course, I had to let Baby and Slim know and hope they would understand my expensive taste. It all came together."

She described the video as "beautiful — the clothes, everything. The ambiance ... It's for all the girls that like to play dress-up. They're gonna love this one". "We wanted to make it pretty in the dirt. We wanted to have a very crazy contrast. I didn't want to do everything clean. I like the dirt. All that pink stuff looks even prettier in the dirt."

The video premiered on BET's 106 & Park on March 31, 2010. It is in native 4:3 instead of 16:9 like most other music videos from the era. The video comprises a helicopter chase and militaristic desert and jungle scenes. Sean Garrett features, and Birdman, Amber Rose, and Ringmasters of Season 3 of America's Best Dance Crew make cameos.

Monica Herrera of Billboard said the video is inspired by B-movies. Chris Ryan of MTV News called Minaj "a trendsetter and a strident, unique artist" and the video "bananas".

In June 2010, Hollywood Exotic Car Rental filed a lawsuit against Minaj for damages and unpaid rental charges on the 2008 Lamborghini used in the video. They claimed that the vehicle was driven "off-road" and damaged "in the approximate amount of $11,589.41." Minaj rented the vehicle for $1,750 a day for the video, and the company claimed three days rent was owed, costing an additional $5,250.

== Charts ==
Chart performance for "Massive Attack"
Chart (2010)	Peak position
US Bubbling Under Hot 100 (Billboard)	22
US Hot R&B/Hip-Hop Songs (Billboard)	65

== Release history ==
Region	Date	Format
United States	April 13, 2010	Digital download
United States	April 13, 2010	Rhythmic airplay
United States	April 20, 2010	Urban airplay
Brazil	April 16, 2010	Digital download
