= Sean Garrett =

American singer (born 1979)

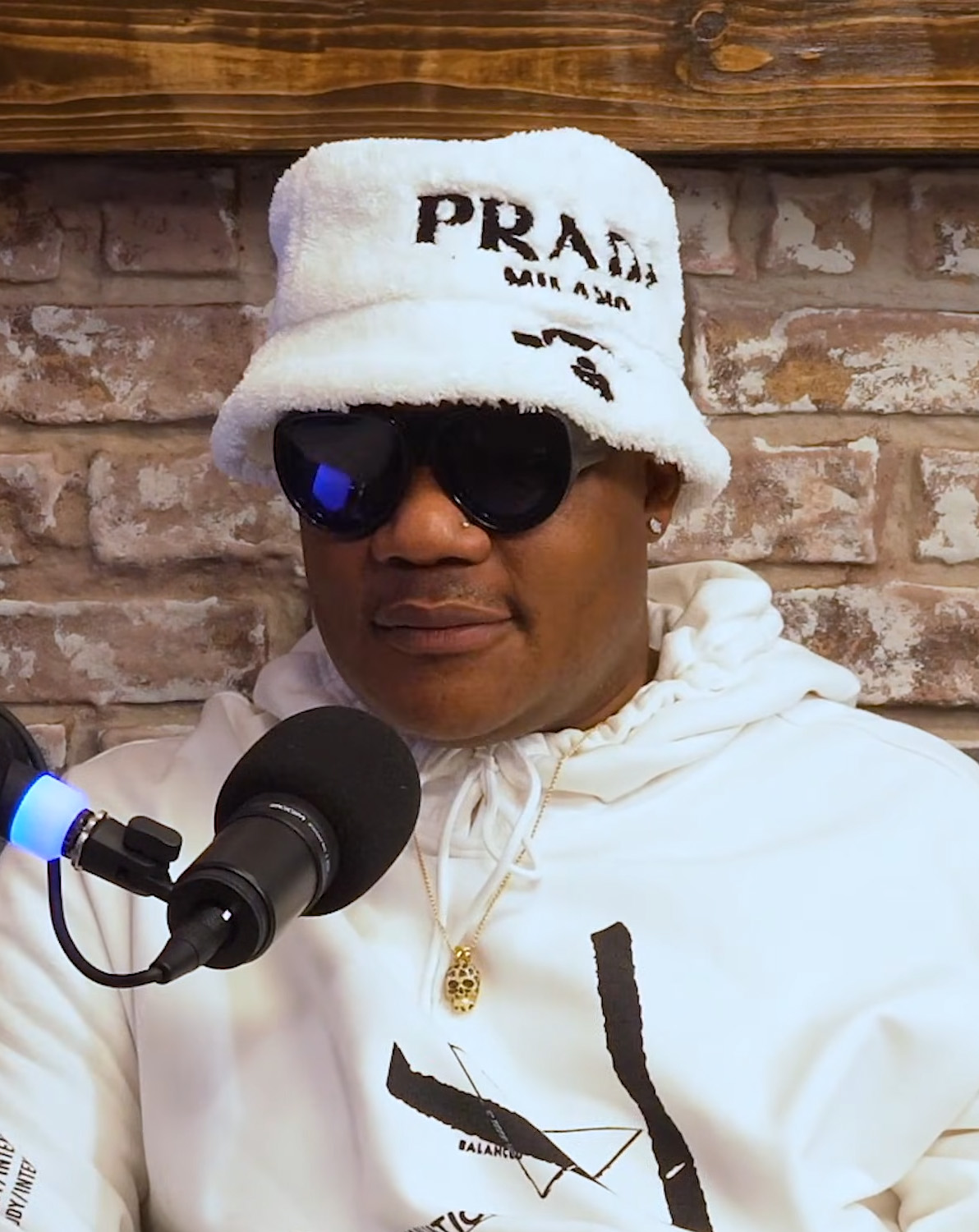
- Garrett in 2026

Background information
- Also known as: The Pen; The Bottle
- Born: Garrett Robin Hamler; March 30, 1979 (age 47); Atlanta, Georgia, U.S.
- Genre: R&B
- Occupations: Singer; songwriter; record producer
- Works: Sean Garrett production discography
- Years active: 2004–present
- Labels: Atlantic Records; Columbia; Blackground Records 2.0; Interscope; Bet I Penned It; Hey Young World

Garrett Robin Hamler (born March 30, 1979), known professionally as Sean Garrett, (Note: He is often referred as "The Pen" and less frequently "The Bottle" in his guest appearances.) is an American singer, songwriter, and record producer. He is known for his songwriting work on several mid-2000s R&B and hip-hop songs, beginning with Usher's 2004 single "Yeah!". The song peaked atop the Billboard Hot 100, along with five other songs he co-wrote—"Goodies" for Ciara that same year; "Check on It" for Beyoncé, "Run It!" for Chris Brown in 2005; "London Bridge" for Fergie, and "Grillz" for Nelly in 2006. In addition, he has co-written 17 other singles that peaked atop the UK Singles, US Hot R&B/Hip-Hop Songs, or Dance Club Songs charts. Garrett has been nominated for four Grammy Awards.

His other notable songwriting credits include Beyoncé's singles "Diva", "Video Phone", "Get Me Bodied", and "Upgrade U", as well as Destiny's Child's "Soldier", "Lose My Breath", and "Girl", The Pussycat Dolls' "Buttons", Chris Brown's "Wall to Wall" and "Gimme That", and Summer Walker's "No Love". His songwriting is often in tandem with productions by Swizz Beatz, Polow da Don, or Bangladesh.

As a recording artist himself, Garrett has guest performed on the Billboard Hot 100-top 40 singles "What Them Girls Like" by Ludacris in 2008, "Break Up" by Mario in 2009, and Nicki Minaj's 2010 debut single "Massive Attack". His debut studio album, Turbo 919 (2008), was released only in Japan by Interscope Records. His 2010 single, "Get It All" (featuring Nicki Minaj), and 2011 single, "Feel Love" (featuring Drake or J. Cole), were both included on his debut mixtape, The Inkwell (2011).

== Early life ==
A military brat, Garrett was born in Atlanta, Georgia, but moved to Neuenbürg, Germany at the age of five, where he lived until the age of 20. His mother worked for the United States Federal Government, and died when he was young. While in Germany, he attended an international program for the University of Maryland, College Park, from which he received an associate's degree in Business.

== Career ==
His recording career began in his early teens, and he signed with Ariola-BMG at the age of 14, but left the label without any releases. Prior to entering the music business, Garrett worked as a mortgage broker after moving back to the United States.

His debut studio album, Turbo 919, was released June 21, 2008, on his Bet I Penned It Music imprint, through Interscope Records. Garrett's catchphrase, which is featured in multiple songs he has produced, is "Smash on the radio, bet I penned it".

Ludacris appeared on Garrett's debut single, "Grippin'". In return, Garrett was featured on Ludacris's "What Them Girls Like", alongside Chris Brown. He also wrote and produced the song "I Did It for Love" for South Korean pop singer BoA's eponymous debut album. Garrett provides the song's background vocals and appears in the music video. In March 2010, Garrett released the first single from his mixtape The Inkwell, "Get It All", which features Nicki Minaj. The lead single for Garrett's 2011 album previously titled Courtesy Of, "Feel Love", was released on February 4, 2011, and featured J. Cole. In April 2011, he released the single "In da Box" featuring Rick Ross.

In June 2025, Garrett discussed working on singer Aaliyah's posthumous studio album, Unstoppable; in May 2025, Aaliyah's single "Gone", featuring Tank", which Garrett co-produced alongside Azul Wynter, was released. On the project, Garrett shared, "Growing up admiring Aaliyah, who is such an icon, has completely been an inspiration for all of us [...] I could not have been more blessed to have made a record with her and Tank. Amazing voices and talent."

== Discography ==
=== Studio albums ===
List of albums, with selected chart positions
Title	Album details	Peak chart positions
Title	Album details	JPN
Turbo 919	Released: August 28, 2008; Label: Bet I Penned It, Interscope; Format: CD, digital download	12

=== Mixtapes ===
List of albums, with selected details
Title	Album details
The Inkwell	Released: August 24, 2010; Hosted by DJ Green Lantern; Formats: Free download; Label: Bet I Penned It, Interscope

=== As lead artist ===
List of singles as lead artist, with selected chart positions, showing year released and album name
Title	Year	Peak chart positions	Album
Title	Year	US R&B	Album
"Grippin'" (featuring Ludacris)	2007	40	Turbo 919
"6 in the Morning"	2007	—	Turbo 919
"Lay Up Under Me"	2008	—	Turbo 919
"Get It All" (featuring Nicki Minaj)	2010	83	The Inkwell
"Feel Love" (featuring J. Cole)	2011	49	Non-album singles
"In da Box" (featuring Rick Ross)	2011	54	Non-album singles
"Twilight Zone" (featuring Trey Songz and Future)	2013	—	Non-album singles
"Anytime" (featuring Migos)	2013	—	Non-album singles
"Look on Your Face" (featuring Lil Yachty)	2016	—	Non-album singles
"Baddie" (featuring Jacquees)	2024	—	Non-album singles
"—" denotes a recording that did not chart or was not released in that territory.

=== As featured artist ===
List of singles as featured artist, with selected chart positions, showing year released and album name
Title	Year	Peak chart positions				Album
Title	Year	US	US R&B	US Rap	US Dance	Album
"What Them Girls Like" (Ludacris featuring Chris Brown and Sean Garrett)	2008	33	17	8	—	Theater of the Mind
"Away" (Enrique Iglesias featuring Sean Garrett)	2008	—	—	—	1	Greatest Hits
"I Did It for Love" (BoA featuring Sean Garrett)	2009	—	—	—	19	BoA
"Break Up" (Mario featuring Gucci Mane and Sean Garrett)	2009	14	2	—	—	DNA
"Massive Attack" (Nicki Minaj featuring Sean Garrett)	2010	122	62	—	—	Non-album single
"—" denotes a recording that did not chart or was not released in that territory.

=== Other charted songs ===
List of songs, with selected chart positions, showing year released and album name
Title	Year	Peak chart positions		Album
Title	Year	US R&B	US Rap	Album
"Up in My Heart" (featuring Gucci Mane)	2009	102	—	Non-album single
"—" denotes a recording that did not chart or was not released in that territory.

=== Guest appearances ===
List of non-single guest appearances, with other performing artists, showing year released and album name
Title	Year	Other artist(s)	Album
"Street Light"	2008	Plies	Da REAList
"Rock You"	2008	Jesse McCartney	Departure

=== Songwriting ===
- Usher –
  - "Yeah!"
  - "Papers"
  - “Glu”
- Ciara – "Goodies"
- Teairra Marí – "Make Her Feel Good"
- Mario – "Break Up"
- Ludacris – "What Them Girls Like"
- Nicki Minaj –
  - "Massive Attack"
  - "Get It All"
- Brandy –
  - "Put It Down" feat. Chris Brown
  - "Wildest Dreams"
- Enrique Iglesias – "Away"
- Kelis – "Bossy"
- Trey Songz – "Does He Do It"
- Nelly –
  - "Party People"
  - "Grillz"
- The Pussycat Dolls – "Buttons"
- 3LW – "Ain't Enough"
- Britney Spears – "Toy Soldier"
- Lil Wayne – "Ice"
- Miley Cyrus
  - "SMS (Bangerz)"
  - "Love Money Party"
- Jesse McCartney – "How Do You Sleep"
- Destiny's Child
  - "Lose My Breath"
  - "Soldier"
  - "Girl"
- Beyoncé
  - "Ring the Alarm"
  - "Get Me Bodied"
  - "Upgrade U"
  - "Check on It"
  - "Lay Up Under Me"
  - "Diva"
  - "Video Phone"
- Kelly Rowland – "Like This"
- Ricky Martin – "I Don't Care"
- 112
  - "U Already Know"
  - "If I Hit"
  - "My Mistakes"
  - "The Way"
  - "Closing The Club"
  - "Why Can't We Get Along"
- Nicole Scherzinger – "Whatever U Like"
- Gwen Stefani – "Now That You Got It"
- Santana – "This Boy's Fire"
- Joe – "Where You At"
- Austin Mahone – "Banga Banga"
- Jacquees – "Come Get It"
- Megan Thee Stallion - "Roc Steady (feat. Flo Milli)"

== Awards and nominations ==
- Soul Train Music Awards
  - 2009, Best Collaboration "Break Up" (nominated)
