= Lay Up Under Me =

2008 song composed by Tor Erik Hermansen performed by Sean Garrett

Single by Sean Garrett

from the album Turbo 919
- Released: November 18, 2008
- Length: 4:28
- Label: Bet I Penned It; Interscope
- Songwriters: Sean Garrett; Mikkel Eriksen; Shea Taylor; Tor Erik Hermansen
- Producers: Sean Garrett; Stargate

Sean Garrett singles chronology
"Away" (2008)	"Lay Up Under Me" (2008)	"I Did It for Love" (2009)

"Lay Up Under Me" is a song performed by American recording artist and producer Sean Garrett for his debut studio album, Turbo 919 (2008). It was written by Garrett, Mikkel Eriksen, Tor Erik Hermansen and Shea Taylor, while its production was handled by Garrett and Stargate. Interscope Records released "Lay Up Under Me" as the third single from Turbo 919 on November 18, 2008. Music critics generally praised the collaboration between Garrett and Stargate. The song charted at number 19 on the US Bubbling Under R&B/Hip-Hop Singles chart. "Lay Up Under Me" was later rerecorded by American recording artist Beyoncé for the deluxe edition of her fourth studio album, 4 (2011).

== Sean Garrett version ==
"Lay Up Under Me" was written by Sean Garrett, Mikkel Eriksen, Tor Erik Hermansen and Shea Taylor, while is production was handled by Garrett and Stargate. The song was released by Interscope Records and Bet I Penned It as the third single from Turbo 919 on February 1, 2008 in the United States. "Lay Up Under Me" is an R&B song, in which Garrett uses soft vocals while Stargate provides accompaniment.

A writer from DJ Booth wrote that it bears resemblance to the alternate music Stargate had produced, including Joe's 2007 song "If I Was Your Man" and Jennifer Hudson's 2008 song "Spotlight". He awarded "Lay Up Under Me" a rating of three stars out of five, writing that the song could find a comfortable spot in rotation with some quality radio promotion. He added that it might be "the spark needed to start the engine" of Garrett's career as a lead singer. A writer from Yahoo! noted that "Lay Up Under Me" is an interesting collaboration between Sean and StarGate, before adding, "[It] is vastly different than most of the rest of the album and this is a welcome change." "Lay Up Under Me" charted for four weeks on US Bubbling Under R&B/Hip-Hop Singles chart, and peaked at number 19.

== Beyoncé version ==
"Lay Up Under Me"

Song by Beyoncé

from the album 4
- Recorded: 2011
- Genre: Funk; R&B
- Length: 4:13
- Label: Columbia
- Songwriters: Beyoncé Knowles; Garrett; Eriksen; Hermansen; Taylor
- Producers: Knowles; Taylor

American singer Beyoncé rerecorded "Lay Up Under Me" for the deluxe edition of her fourth studio album, 4 (2011). It was made available on the deluxe edition of 4, which could only be purchased at Target Corporation until January 2012. The deluxe edition was released to iTunes Stores on January 2, 2012. It includes two additional tracks, "Schoolin' Life" and "Dance for You", and three remixes of the lead single "Run the World (Girls)" (2011). In 2013, the Target deluxe edition and standard edition of the album were replaced with the expanded edition in both physical and iTunes formats. This edition excludes Beyoncé's version of "Lay Up Under Me".

Knowles' version of "Lay Up Under Me" is an uptempo R&B and funk song, which recalls the 1970s soul music with retro style horn instrumentation; "Lay Up Under Me" features a content-sounding Knowles gushing over the lyrics. She tells her romantic interest to forget the club as the party is right at home with her, as she sings "You ain't gotta worry 'bout a club, just come on lay up under me tonight."

=== Reception ===
The song received generally positive reviews from music critics. Danielle Cheesman of MSN Music wrote that "Lay Up Under Me" is the type of song to which people "step to at a barbecue". Bradley Stern of MuuMuse found the song to be as "soul-warming" as "Love on Top". Likewise, Andrew Tidball of the New Zealand-based website Cheese on Toast commented that "Lay Up Under Me" is a Motown-esque number in the vein of "Love on Top", adding that the latter's "style repeated to good effect [in the former]. He concluded that the song should have been included on the standard version of 4. Alexandra Boisvert of Musiqtone wrote, "'Lay Up Under Me' is a song about exactly what it sounds like. The fact that the song is so catchy and upbeat almost distracts from the message, but it enhances the emotions portrayed." Ryan Dombal of Pitchfork Media likened it to Michael Jackson's work from Off the Wall (1979).

=== Charts ===
For the week ending July 30, 2011, "Lay Up Under Me" debuted at the top of the South Korean International Singles Chart, selling 106,671 digital downloads. It became the thirty-sixth-best selling international song of 2011 in South Korea, having sold 386,920 digital downloads.

=== Credits and personnel ===
Credits are taken from 4 liner notes.

- Vocals: Beyoncé Knowles
- Writing: Beyoncé Knowles, Sean Garrett, Mikkel Eriksen, Tor Erik Hermansen, S. Taylor
- Producing: Beyoncé Knowles, S. Taylor
- Recording: Jordan "DJ Swivel" Young
  - Assistant Engineer: Ryan Kelly
- Mixing engineer: Serban Ghenea, John Haynes
  - Assistant mix engineer: Phil Seaford
- The SuperPower Horns:
  - Trumpets: Cole Kamen-Green, Josiah Woodson
  - Tenor and alto saxophone: Nick Videen, Drew Sayers
  - Trombone: Alex Asher
- Guitar: Robert "R.T." Tayler
- Bass guitar: Jack Daley
- Drums and tambourine: Nikki Glaspie
