= D.N.A. (Mario album) =

Studio album by Mario
- Released: October 13, 2009
- Recorded: February 2008 – March 2009
- Genre: R&B
- Length: 46:42
- Labels: 3rd Street; Soul Truth; J
- Producers: Bangladesh; Vidal Davis; Sean Garrett; Andre Harris; Sean K. Hall; Eric Hudson; Jackpot; Jim Jonsin; Harold Lilly; Rico Love; Malay; Los Da Mystro; The Monarch; Terius "The-Dream" Nash; Kawan "KP" Prather; The Runners; Stargate; C. "Tricky" Stewart; Elvis "Blac Elvis" Williams

Mario chronology
Go (2007)	D.N.A. (2009)	Dancing Shadows (2018)

Singles from D.N.A.
- 1. "Break Up" Released: April 28, 2009; 2. "Thinkin' About You" Released: September 8, 2009

D.N.A. is the fourth studio album by American singer Mario, released on October 13, 2009, by 3rd Street Music Group, Soul Truth Entertainment and J Records. Originally titled And Then There Was Me and delayed several times to accommodate more creative time, D.N.A is a R&B album that explores the heartbreak of a man experiencing separation and the emotions of love. On the album, Mario collaborated with new partners such as The-Dream, Soundz, and Jim Jonsin, among others. Rappers Gucci Mane, Sean Garrett and Big Sean all make guest appearances on the album.

The album was preceded by two singles: "Break Up" (features Garrett and Mane) which peaked at number 2 on the Hot R&B/Hip-Hop Chart and 14 on the Billboard Hot 100, becoming Mario's most successful single in five years since "Let Me Love You". The second single, "Thinkin' About You" was released on September 4, 2009. Following the album's release, it spawned the promotional single "Stranded". Music critics praised the album, Metacritic reviews indicated generally positive sentiments for the album's production, Mario's approach to the emotions of love and singled out the album's sound for differing from other R&B albums at the time.

== Recording and production ==
At the end of 2007 Mario told Billboard Magazine that he had already begun designing the concept for his new album and that production would begin in February 2008. Later in an interview he described this album as World music, an old school R&B influenced with a modern dance pop sound and calling this the "most personal, colossal album of his career".

In late 2008 a track titled "Emergency Room" leaked to the internet, credited to Mario and featuring Rihanna, and also played by various radio stations throughout the country. Initially people were quick to assume it was Rihanna on the track, as the studio vocalist Priscilla Renea's voice resembled Rihanna's. The song is produced by Soundz Also the song's title was especially controversial, because of the situation which Rihanna is with her boyfriend Chris Brown, which Vibe.com has documented extensively. Of the song Mario said "This was a rough cut that I was working on and wanted to present it to Rihanna and her record label. Those aren't Rihanna's vocals on the song at all. The record was far from done. I'm still proud of the record but want to make sure that the truth is out there."

=== Concept and themes ===
Mario described the song "The Hardest Moment" which is set to be on his album as "Personal, because I say things in the record that have multiple meanings. Like the chorus says, "A man that ain't afraid to cry is a man that's not afraid to die." That to me, even though I'm talking about a relationship in the song, I'm talking about that point in a relationship where everything is over. It's like, you guys are cool, you guys are friends, but you're totally going separate ways. That's probably one of the hardest things a young man and young woman can go through in their relationship. And, so that's what I'm saying in that line. But it also means to me that a strong man is not afraid to be vulnerable, to cry and let it out. In a previous interview the song "Starlight" produced by The-Dream, Mario has explained the record: "the song is about going after a woman and describes it as dreamy and swaggerized".

The album was originally scheduled to be released under the title And Then There Was Me. But on January 10, 2009, Mario told Singersroom.com that the album title may change for his effort. When asked to explain what the original title meant he said "And Then There Was Me is more than just me sayin' my music is fresh, but who I am as a person. That title for me is like, you've got the Trey Songz', the Ne-Yos, and you've got the Chris Browns of the world—you've got all these new artists. This is my fourth album, and some of them aren't even on their third [album]—I'm coming back with something fresh and new. And then there's me, there's Mario." The album title has since changed to "D.N.A" to reflect the musical changes that Mario has gone through since his last album.

== Release and promotion ==
Mario was initially unsure of when the album would be released. However, in an interview with Rap-Up.com, he was considering March or April 2009. The release date was pushed back to June 2009. But then on Twitter he said "It's getting close "And Then There Was Me" late summer". Online retailers, Amazon later confirmed a September 22, 2009 release date for the project, which later changed again to October 13, 2009, by J Records and Mario's official website, for a United States release. It is Mario's second album to feature a Parental Advisory warning for strong language, the first being 2007's release of Go.

In early September 2009, Mario, Trey Songz, Day26 and Sean Garrett announced on 106 & Park that they will all tour with RichGirl across the U.S.

=== Singles ===
- "Break Up" was the lead single of the album featuring Sean Garrett and Gucci Mane. It was written by Garret and Mario with production from Bangladesh.
- "Thinkin' About You" is the second single to be released on September 4, 2009. The song debuted on the US Hot R&B/Hip-Hop Songs, at number 96. The single was produced by the Runners and the Monarch.
- "Stranded" was sent to US Urban AC radio on November 23, 2009 In January 2010, the song entered on the Billboard Hot R&B/Hip-Hop Songs peaking at number 84.
- Mario recorded a music video in the Baltimore/Washington, D.C. metropolitan area for the song "Ooh Baby" and was released on January 21, 2010.

== Critical reception ==
Professional ratings
Review scores
Source	Rating
About.com	3/5 stars
AllMusic	3.5/5 stars
DJ Booth	3.5/5
Entertainment Weekly	B−
Newsday	B+
Now	3/5 stars
Prestige Magazine	8/10
USA Today	3/4 stars

Upon its release, D.N.A. received generally positive reviews from most music critics, based on an aggregate score of 73/100 from Metacritic. Ken Capobianco of The Boston Globe called the album an "unfussy, beautifully sung set" in which "the 23-year-old Mario taps into the tenderness of early Maxwell", producing "straight-up love songs without histrionics...and Mario's singing so smooth that Stevie Wonder would approve." Andrew Rennie of Now argues the album is "grown-up, seductive and a little bit explicit (when it needs to be)...it's a small triumph for guys trying to get in touch with their emotions through the medium of R&B." Mariel Concepcion of Billboard magazine praised Mario's "representation of desolation" on D.N.A.: "Mario has a broken heart and he's pouring it all out on his latest set." Glenn Gamboa of Newsday concluded that Mario has now "mastered smooth R&B". Steve Jones of USA Today notes, "with each new album, Mario...has grown a little more adventurous artistically." ConcreteLoop.com gave D.N.A. a mostly positive review, stating the album "is refreshingly different in a sea of R&B that tends to sound a little monotonous." In summation of his album review, Nile Ivey of BET said D.N.A. "kept a consistent setting giving the consumer the full on experience on what it's like for a man to endure a painful separation. Not to say Mario himself went through one, however, he did a hell of a job convincing us he did."

Though the reviews were mostly positive, there were a few criticisms leveled at D.N.A.. Andy Kellman of AllMusic laments, "while it will please the majority of the fan base, the material does not allow Mario -- a vocalist more versatile than many would like to admit -- to do much more than toggle between a Lothario and a softie." Mikael Wood of Entertainment Weekly called Mario "forgettable" in his mixed review of the album, arguing: "lack of personality doesn't kill the disc's ample pleasures. It just makes you wonder whose D.N.A. we're examining." DJBooth.Net was left believing that D.N.A. represents Mario "expanding as a musician, but not necessarily evolving."

== Commercial performance ==
D.N.A. debuted at number 9 on the US Billboard 200 and number 2 on Top R&B/Hip-Hop Albums chart selling 32,000 copies in its first week.

Mario commented on the sales to Billboard; "I can't say why I don't get my just due, but it only makes me hungrier," he says. "I want to continue challenging myself and making incredible music that will connect with fans around the world. I plan to keep creating a distinctive lane for myself. D.N.A., with the help of "Break Up," does just that.

== Track listing ==
D.N.A. track listing
No.	Title	Writer(s)	Producer(s)	Length
1.	"Break Up" (featuring Gucci Mane & Sean Garrett)	Sean "The Pen" Garrett; Radric Davis; Shondrae Crawford	Sean Garrett; Mr. Bangladesh	4:09
2.	"Thinkin' About You"	Jermaine Jackson; Andrew Harr; Andre Davidson; Shawn Davidson; Karlyn Ramsey; Richard Butler	The Runners; The Monarch^{[a]}; Rico Love^{[b]}	4:37
3.	"Get Out"	James Scheffer; Butler	Jim Jonsin; Love	3:22
4.	"Soundtrack to My Broken Heart"	Carlos McKinney; Butler	Los Da Mystro; Love	3:10
5.	"Starlight"	Christopher Stewart; Terius Nash	Tricky Stewart; The-Dream	3:57
6.	"Stranded"	Eric Hudson; Garrett	Hudson; Garrett	3:23
7.	"Ooh Baby"	Joel "JackPot" Augustin; Alan Biamby; Butler	JackPot; Rico Love	3:40
8.	"Before She Said Hi" (featuring Big Sean)	Andre Harris; Vidal Davis; Harry Zelnick; Sean Anderson; Alexander Chiger; Dixon Wylie; Bobby Dan Pointer; Ronald Simmons; Simtic Simmons	Dre & Vidal; Love	4:25
9.	"I Choose You"	Tor Erik Hermansen; Mikkel S. Eriksen; Kenneth Edmonds	Stargate	4:22
10.	"Don't Walk Away"	Stewart; Sean K. Hall; Mario Barrett; Chuka Maduakor; Thabiso Nkhereanye	Stewart; Hall; The-Dream^{[b]}	3:57
11.	"I Miss My Friend"	James Ho; Kawan "KP" Prather; Jessyca Wilson; Edmonds	Malay; KP	3:48
12.	"The Hardest Moment"	Elvis Williams; Lilly; Mack Woodward	Blac Elvis; Lilly	3:36
Total length:				46:42

iTunes pre-order bonus tracks
No.	Title	Writer(s)	Producer(s)	Length
13.	"Depression (Thinkin' of You)"	CJ Hilton	Hilton	3:32

Japan bonus tracks
No.	Title	Writer(s)	Producer(s)	Length
14.	"Do for Love"	Harris; Davis	Dre & Vidal	3:30

Notes

- ^{^[a]} signifies additional producer
- ^{^[b]} signifies co-producer

Sample credits

- "Before She Said Hi" features a portion of the composition "Bootleggin'", as written by Dixon Wylie, Bobby Dan Pointer, Ronald Simmons and Simtic Simmons

== Personnel ==
- Vocals: Mario & Rico Love
- Background vocals: Mario & Rico Love
- Engineers: Paul Boutin, Mikkel S. Eriksen, Kuk Harrell, Malay, Damien Lewis, Phil Margaziotis, Kevin Mayer, Carlos Oyanedelm, Miguel Pidero, Brian "B Luv" Thomas, Pat Thral, Miles Walker, Mike "Hitman" Wilson & James M. Wisner
- Production engineer: Pat Thral
- Musician: Los Da Mystro, Mikkel S. Eriksen & Tor Erik Hermansen (aka Stargate), Eric Hudson & Malay
- Bass: Andre Bowman
- Guitar: Kenneth "Babyface" Edmonds
- Strings: Lee Blaske, Ashanti Floyd & Kevin "Gripp" Griffin
- Strings arrangements: Jeff Bova
- Programming: Sean K. & Malay
- Drum programming: Brent Kolato & Ken Lewis
- Groomer: Julian Payne
- Executive producer: Peter Edge, Robert P. Teamer, Sean Garrett & Mario
- Mastering: David Kutch
- Creative direction/design: Michelle Holme
- Creative producer: Erwin Gorostiza & Robert P. Teamer
- Photography: Florian Schneider
- Styling: Sylvia Akuchie & Rhasika J. Thompson
- Assistant: Kory Aaron, Ghazi Hourani, Edward Lidow, Giancarlo Lino, Erik Madrid, Christian Plata, Jay Henchman, Fareed Salamah, D.P. Samuels, Jason Sherwood & Mike Tsarsati
- Production assistant: Christy Hall & Robert P. Teamer
- Conductor: Los Da Mystro & Rico Love
- Creative producer: Erwin Gorostiza & Robert P. Teamer
- Vocal engineer: Kuk Harrell
- Vocal producers: Kenneth "Babyface" Edmonds, Kuk Harrell & Rico Love
- Mixing: Vidal Davis, Vicent Dilorenzo, Jaycen Fowler, Robert Marks, Manny Marroquin, Dave Pensado, Phil Tam & Phil Tan
- Digital editing: Jeff "Supa Jeff" Villanueva
- Featuring vocals: Gucci Mane, Sean Garrett & Big Sean

== Charts ==
=== Weekly charts ===
Weekly chart performance for D.N.A.
Chart (2009)	Peak position
UK R&B Albums (Official Charts)	19
US Billboard 200	9
US Top R&B/Hip-Hop Albums (Billboard)	2

=== Year-end charts ===
Year-end chart performance for D.N.A.
Chart (2009)	Position
US Top R&B/Hip-Hop Albums (Billboard)	90

== Release history ==
Release dates for D.N.A.
Region	Date	Format	Label(s)	Catalog	Ref(s)
United Kingdom	October 12, 2009	CD; digital download	RCA Music	88697496572	
United States	October 13, 2009	CD; digital download	J Records; Arista Records	886974965725	
Japan	October 21, 2009	CD; digital download	Sony Music Japan	BVCP-40090	
