= Break Up (song) =

Single by Mario featuring Gucci Mane and Sean Garrett

from the album D.N.A.
- Released: April 28, 2009
- Studio: Bangladesh Studios (Atlanta, Georgia)
- Genre: R&B; hip-hop
- Length: 4:10
- Label: J
- Songwriters: Radric Davis; Garrett Hamler
- Producers: Bangladesh; Sean Garrett

Mario singles chronology
"Choosin" (2009)	"Break Up" (2009)	"Thinkin' About You" (2009)

Gucci Mane singles chronology
"Ridiculous" (2009)	"Break Up" (2009)	"Wasted" (2009)

Sean Garrett singles chronology
"I Did It for Love" (2009)	"Break Up" (2009)	"Get It All" (2010)

Music video
- "Break Up" on YouTube

"Break Up" is a song by American singer Mario from his fourth studio album D.N.A. (2009). It features and was co-written by Gucci Mane and Sean Garrett, with production from Bangladesh and Garrett. Released by J Records on April 28, 2009 as the album's lead single, it was first premiered on the radio station V-103 at March 30, 2009 with Greg Street.

The song earned largely positive reviews from music critics, some of whom compared Bangladesh's productions to Beyoncé's "Diva" (2009) and Lil Wayne's "A Milli" (2008). A major success, "Break Up" reached number 14 on the US Billboard Hot 100 and peaked at number two on the US Hot R&B/Hip-Hop Songs, becoming Mario's fourth top five hit on the chart as well as his biggest hit since "Let Me Love You" (2004), eventually reaching Platinum status in the US. At the 2009 Soul Train Music Awards, it was nominated in the Best Collaboration category.

== Background ==
"Break Up" was written by Sean Garrett and Gucci Mane. Initially written for a different artist, Mario commented on the track in a 2009 interview: "It’s a club record and every man has experienced this situation before. It's like why would you want to break up with me when you gon' get the same thing with the next man. But, he ain't gon do it as fly as I can. I can't wait to perform it. It's going to be a movie. Look for the movie! We're not calling this a single or a video, we're calling it a movie." He further told Singersroom the same year: "It’s written in a very different way than I would usually sing or perform a situation like that. It’s written from a male perspective [..] more like "why," like" why break up when you’re going to have to do the same thing with somebody else (and) start all over again." So it’s definitely a true story."

== Critical reception ==
The song earned largely positive reviews from music critics, although some noted that the drums are simplistic and resemble Bangladesh's previous productions such as Beyoncé's "Diva" (2009) and Lil Wayne's "A Milli" (2008). In his review of parent album D.N.A. AllMusic editor Andy Kellmann noted that song was turning "out to be his fourth album's greatest deviation from the back catalog, carrying a laggard and sparse pulse to back Mario's whiny swagger." Now's Andrew Rennie remarked that the "Bangladesh-produced "Break Up," with Gucci Mane and Sean Garrett, lends the album street cred." DjBooth.net remarkd that "while Gucci Mane's guest verse [..] might seem unnecessary to some, Sean Garrett's writing and background vocals, together with Bangladesh's repetitive, percussion-heavy beat add up to what could be one of the most widely-spun singles of spring/summer '09!."

== Chart performance ==
"Break Up" first appeared on the US Billboard Bubbling Under R&B/Hip-Hop Singles chart at number 11, peaking at 10 the following week. It later entered Billboard's Hot R&B/Hip-Hop Songs, peaking at number 2, becoming Mario's fourth top five hit on the chart after "Just a Friend 2002" (2002), "Let Me Love You" (2004) and "Crying Out for Me" (2007). Initially, the song charted on the Bubbling Under Hot 100 Singles chart at number 17. On the chart week of July 4, 2009, Break Up" debuted on the Billboard Hot 100 chart at number 98. It eventually peaked at number 14, becoming Sean Garrett's highest-charting single up to then as well as Mario's highest-charting since "Let Me Love You" (2004). Billboard ranked the song third on its 2009 Hot R&B/Hip-Hop Songs year end-chart behind Jamie Foxx's "Blame It" and Maxwell's "Pretty Wings". On July 30, 2020, "Break Up" was certified Platinum by the Recording Industry Association of America (RIAA).

== Music video ==
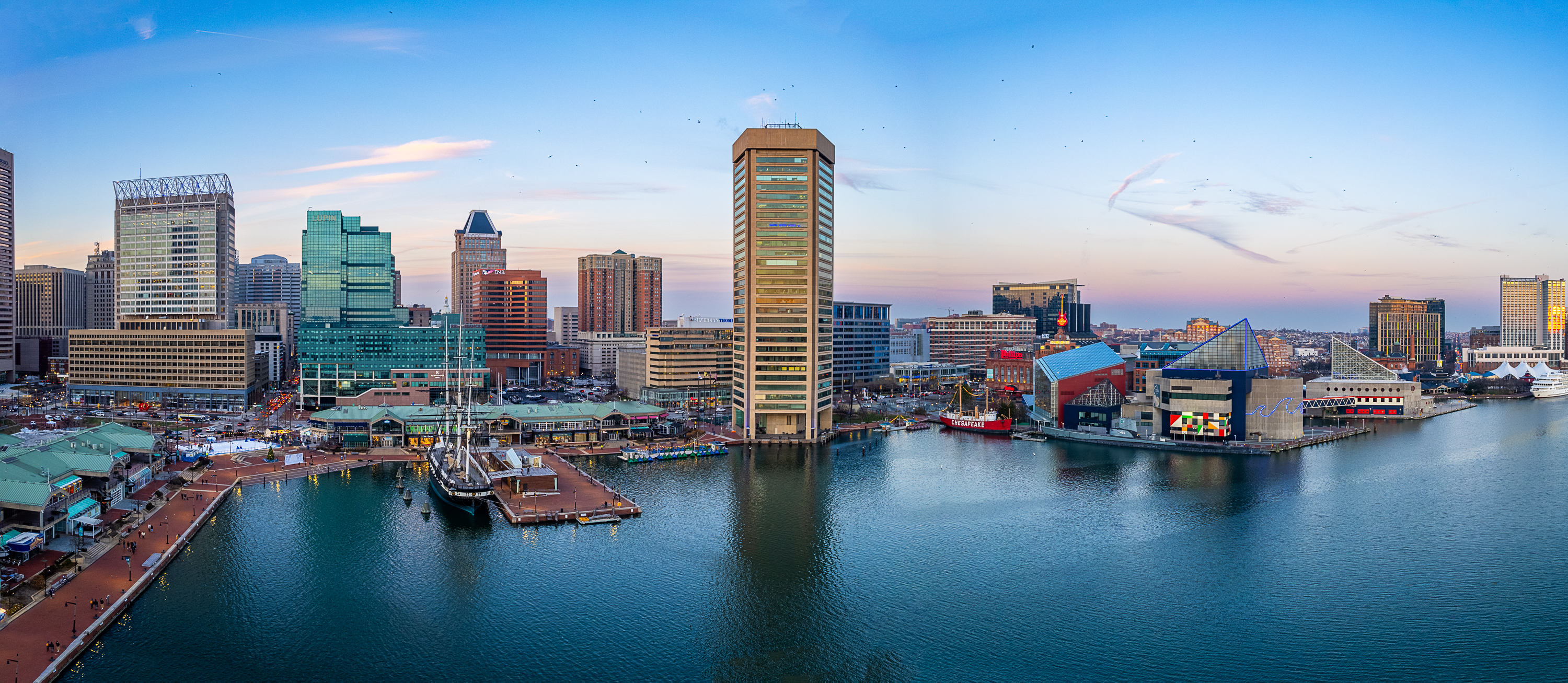
The music video for "Break Up" was filmed in various locations throughout Baltimore, Maryland.

A music video for "Break Up," directed by Chris Robinson, was shot in the second week of June 2009 in Baltimore, Maryland. Large portions of the visuals were filmed in a new complex on the Inner Harbor. Audra Simmons of R&B girl group RichGirl plays the role of Mario's girlfriend, who wants to break up with him. In the video, it is shown that they argue and he is not a trustworthy boyfriend, as he is seen flirting with another girl in a club. He still tries to look for her, however, remarking in the song that although he cheats, he loves her. Fellow RichGirl member Christina "Brave" Williams also makes a short appearance in which she and Simmons are shown catching Mario in the act with another girl. Model Rosa Acosta also makes an appearance.

On July 2, Mario announced on his Twitter that he would be on BET's video countdown show 106 & Park to premiere the music video, However, on July 7, it was announced on his website that the video would world premiere exclusively on WorldStarHipHop on July 9. The video quickly rose on 106 & Park: It debuted at number 10, eventually moving to number 7. On July 22, it moved up to number 3 on the countdown. By the end of the week, the video reached number 1. Due its success, "Break Up" was placed at number 7 on BET's Notarized: Top 100 Videos of 2009 countdown.

== Other versions ==
Various unofficial remixes were made with Mario, Gucci Mane and Sean Garrett still included: one with Bow Wow, another with Nicki Minaj and the last featuring Rick Ross and Young Breed. American rapper Tyga made a freestyle of the song. R&B singer Trey Songz released a version called "Wake Up" with changed lyrics. Lil Wayne also did a remix on his No Ceilings mixtape.

== Track listing ==
Digital single
No.	Title	Writer(s)	Producer(s)	Length
1.	"Break Up" (featuring Gucci Mane & Sean Garrett)	Garrett; Radric Davis; Shondrae Crawford	Garrett; Mr. Bangladesh	4:09
2.	"Something Did I Wrong"	Mario Barrett; Charles Hilton, Jr.	CJ Hilton	3:20

== Credits and personnel ==
Credits lifted from the liner notes of D.N.A..

- Kory Aaron – recording assistance
- Mario Barrett – lead vocalist
- Shondrae "Bangladesh" Crawford – producer, writer
- Radric Davis – writer
- Sean "The Pen" Garrett – guest vocalist, vocal producer, writer
- Edward Lidow – mixing assistance
- Gucci Mane – guest vocalist
- Fabian Marasciullo – mixing engineer
- D.P. Samuels – recording assistance
- Miles Walker – recording engineer

== Charts ==
=== Weekly charts ===
Weekly chart performance for "Break Up"
Chart (2009)	Peak position
US Billboard Hot 100	14
US Dance/Mix Show Airplay (Billboard)	24
US Hot R&B/Hip-Hop Songs (Billboard)	2
US Rhythmic Airplay (Billboard)	4

=== Year-end charts ===
Year-end chart performance for "Break Up"
Chart (2009)	Position
US Billboard Hot 100	65
US Hot R&B/Hip-Hop Songs (Billboard)	3
US Rhythmic (Billboard)	28

== Certifications ==
Certifications for "Break Up"
Region	Certification	Certified units/sales
United States (RIAA)	Platinum	1,000,000^{‡}
^{‡} Sales+streaming figures based on certification alone.

== Release history ==
Release dates for "Break Up"
Region	Date	Format(s)	Label(s)	Ref.
United States	April 28, 2009	Digital download	J	
United States	May 11, 2009	CD single; promotional airplay	J	
United States	August 18, 2009	Full radio airplay	J	
