= Mario discography =

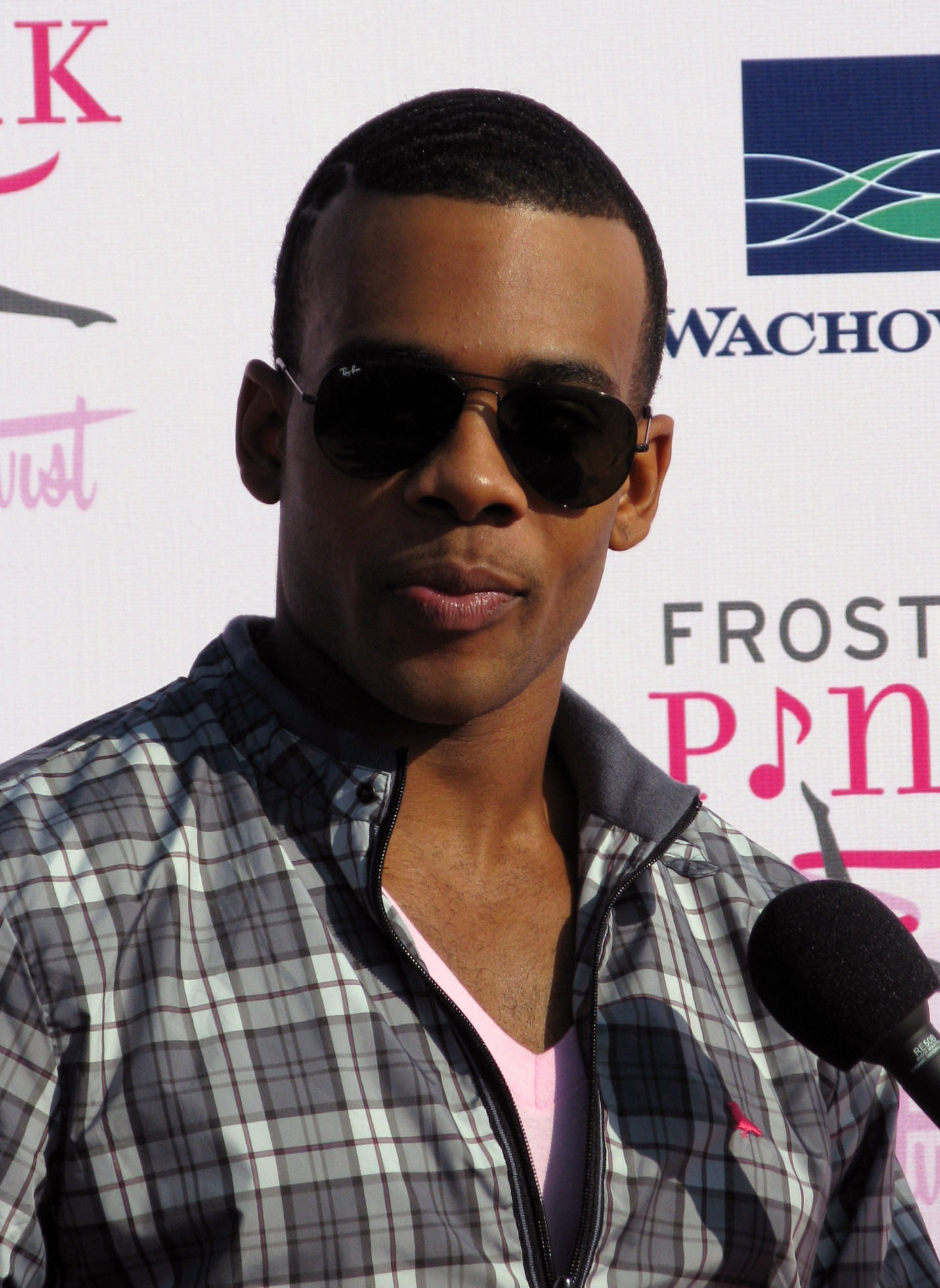
- Mario at the "Frosted Pink with a Twist" Women's Cancer Benefit held in San Diego on September 14, 2008
- Studio albums: 6
- Extended plays: 2
- Compilation albums: 1
- Singles: 17
- Music videos: 21
- Promotional singles: 6

American singer Mario has released six studio albums, one compilation album, two extended plays, seventeen singles (including four as a featured artist), six promotional singles and twenty-one music videos. In his career, Mario has charted 15 entries on Billboard's Hot R&B/Hip-Hop Songs chart. His four studio albums—Mario, Turning Point, Go and D.N.A.—all reached the top 5 on Billboard's Top R&B/Hip-Hop Albums chart. To date, Mario has sold 2.3 million albums, 4.8 million downloads and earned 591 million streams in the US, according to Nielsen Music.

== Albums ==
=== Studio albums ===
List of studio albums, with selected chart positions and certifications
Title	Album details	Peak chart positions											Certifications
Title	Album details	US	US R&B	AUS	FRA	GER	IRE	JPN	NL	NZ	SWI	UK	Certifications
Mario	Released: July 23, 2002; Label: J; Format: CD, cassette, digital download	9	3	—	—	—	—	—	—	—	—	—	RIAA: Gold
Turning Point	Released: December 7, 2004; Label: J, 3rd Street; Format: CD, digital download	13	2	17	42	13	62	—	6	22	10	8	RIAA: Platinum; BPI: Gold; RMNZ: Platinum
Go	Released: December 11, 2007; Label: J, 3rd Street; Format: CD, digital download	21	4	—	—	—	—	43	—	—	—	109	RMNZ: Gold
D.N.A.	Released: October 13, 2009; Label: J; Format: CD, digital download	9	2	—	—	—	—	89	—	—	—	—	
Dancing Shadows	Released: October 5, 2018; Label: New Citizen, Empire; Format: CD, digital download, streaming, vinyl	—	— (Note: Dancing Shadows did not enter the Top R&B/Hip-Hop Albums chart, but peaked at number 41 on the US R&B/Hip-Hop Album Sales chart.)	—	—	—	—	—	—	—	—	—	
Glad You Came	Released: December 13, 2024; Label: New Citizen, Epic; Format: CD, digital download	—	—	—	—	—	—	—	—	—	—	—	
"—" denotes a recording that did not chart or was not released in that territory.

=== Compilation albums ===
List of compilation albums, with selected information
Title	Album details
Turning Point / Mario	Released: August 5, 2008; Label: J, Legacy; Format: CD, digital download

== Extended plays ==
List of extended plays, with selected information
Title	EP details
Closer to Mars	Released: October 16, 2020; Label: New Citizen; Format: Digital download, streaming
Mood Swings	Released: November 14, 2025; Label: New Citizen, Empire; Format: Digital download, steaming

== Singles ==
=== As lead artist ===
List of singles as lead artist, with selected chart positions and certifications, showing year released and album name
Title	Year	Peak chart positions											Certifications	Album
Title	Year	US	US R&B /HH	US Adult R&B	AUS	FRA	GER	IRE	NL	NZ	SWI	UK	Certifications	Album
"Just a Friend 2002"	2002	4	3	—	—	—	—	—	70	15	—	18	RMNZ: Platinum	Mario
"Braid My Hair"	2002	74	18	—	—	—	—	—	—	—	—	—		Mario
"C'Mon"	2003	—	61	—	—	—	—	—	—	—	—	28		Mario
"Let Me Love You"	2004	1	1	2	3	7	1	5	2	1	2	2	RIAA: Platinum; ARIA: Platinum; BPI: 4× Platinum; BVMI: 3× Gold; RMNZ: 7× Platinum; SNEP: Silver	Turning Point
"How Could You"	2005	52	14	—	43	—	—	—	—	—	—	—		Turning Point
"Here I Go Again"	2005	—	—	—	15	—	50	16	40	36	34	11		Turning Point
"Boom" (featuring Juvenile)	2005	—	—	—	—	—	—	—	—	—	—	—		Turning Point
"How Do I Breathe"	2007	46	18	14	33	—	49	45	—	17	61	21	BPI: Silver	Go
"Crying Out for Me"	2007	33	5	26	—	—	—	—	—	—	—	—	RIAA: Gold	Go
"Music for Love"	2008	— (Note: "Music for Love" did not enter the Billboard Hot 100, but peaked at number one on the Bubbling Under Hot 100 chart, which acts as a 25-song extension to the Hot 100.)	18	33	—	—	—	—	—	—	—	—		Go
"Break Up" (featuring Gucci Mane and Sean Garrett)	2009	14	2	—	—	—	—	—	—	—	—	—	RIAA: Platinum	D.N.A.
"Thinkin' About You"	2009	—	45	—	—	—	—	—	—	—	—	—		D.N.A.
"My Bed"	2011	—	— (Note: "My Bed" did not enter the Hot R&B/Hip-Hop Songs chart, but peaked at number 22 on the Bubbling Under R&B/Hip-Hop Songs chart, which acts as a 25-song extension to the R&B/Hip-Hop Songs chart.)	—	—	—	—	—	—	—	—	—		Non-album singles
"The Walls" (featuring Fabolous)	2011	—	58	—	—	—	—	—	—	—	—	—		Non-album singles
"Somebody Else" (featuring Nicki Minaj)	2013	— (Note: "Somebody Else" did not enter the Billboard Hot 100, but peaked at number four on the Bubbling Under Hot 100 chart, which acts as a 25-song extension to the Hot 100.)	27	—	—	—	—	—	—	—	—	—		Non-album singles
"Fatal Distraction"	2013	―	―	35	—	—	—	—	—	—	—	—		Non-album singles
"Forever" (featuring Rick Ross)	2015	―	―	—	—	—	—	—	—	—	—	—		Non-album singles
"I Need More"	2016	―	―	—	—	—	—	—	—	—	—	—		Non-album singles
"Let Me Help You"	2016	―	―	—	—	—	—	—	—	—	—	—		Non-album singles
"Pain is the New Pleasure"	2017	―	―	—	—	—	—	—	—	—	—	—		Non-album singles
"Drowning"	2018	―	―	28	—	—	—	—	—	—	—	—		Dancing Shadows
"Dancing Shadows"	2018	―	―	—	—	—	—	—	—	—	—	—		Dancing Shadows
"Care for You"	2019	―	―	—	—	—	—	—	—	—	—	—		Dancing Shadows
"Mirror" (Pham remix)	2019	―	―	—	—	—	—	—	—	—	—	—		Non-album singles
"Goes Like That" (GXNXVS remix)	2019	―	―	—	—	—	—	—	—	—	—	—		Non-album singles
"Closer"	2020	―	―	—	—	—	—	—	—	—	—	—		Closer to Mars
"Rewrite It"	2020	―	―	—	—	—	—	—	—	—	—	—		Non-album single
"Mars"	2020	―	―	—	—	—	—	—	—	—	—	—		Closer to Mars
"Pretty Mouth Magick"	2020	―	―	—	—	—	—	—	—	—	—	—		Closer to Mars
"Luxury Love"	2021	―	―	—	—	—	—	—	—	—	—	—		Non-album singles
"Get Back" (with Chris Brown)	2021	―	―	—	—	—	—	—	—	— (Note: "Get Back" did not enter the NZ Top 40 Singles Chart, but peaked at number 11 on the NZ Hot Singles Chart.)	—	—		Non-album singles
"Like Her Too" (solo or featuring Sabrina Claudio)	2022	―	―	—	—	—	—	—	—	—	—	—		Non-album singles
"Used to Me" (featuring Ty Dolla Sign)	2023	―	―	—	—	—	—	—	—	—	—	—		Non-album singles
"Main One" (with Tyga and Lil Wayne)	2023	―	―	—	—	—	—	—	—	—	—	—		Non-album singles
"Space"	2024	―	3	—	—	—	—	—	—	—	—	—		Glad You Came
"Glad You Came"	2024	―	20	—	—	—	—	—	—	—	—	—		Glad You Came
"Keep Going (Aaaaahhhhh)"	2024	―	―	—	—	—	—	—	—	—	—	—		Glad You Came
"Nobody But Us"	2025	―	―	—	—	—	—	—	—	—	—	—		Mood Swings
"2 Little 2 Late" (with Levi)	2025	—	—	—	—	—	—	—	—	—	—	—		Non-album single
"Home"	2025	―	―	—	—	—	—	—	—	—	—	—		Mood Swings
"—" denotes a recording that did not chart or was not released in that territory.

=== As featured artist ===
List of singles as featured artist, with selected chart positions, showing year released and album name
Title	Year	Peak chart positions			Album
Title	Year	US	US R&B	US Rap	Album
"That's How I Go" (Baby Bash featuring Lil Jon and Mario)	2009	— (Note: "That's How I Go" did not enter the Billboard Hot 100, but peaked at number seven on the Bubbling Under Hot 100 chart, which acts as a 25-song extension to the Hot 100.)	—	17	Non-album single
"Choosin'"^{[C]} (Young Capone featuring Mario)	2009	—	— (Note: "Choosin'" did not enter the Hot R&B/Hip-Hop Songs chart, but peaked at number 14 on the Bubbling Under R&B/Hip-Hop Songs chart, which acts as a 25-song extension to the R&B/Hip-Hop Songs chart.)	—	Small Things to a Giant
"Headboard" (Hurricane Chris featuring Mario and Plies)	2009	—	63	—	Unleashed
"Ms. Chocolate" (Lil Jon featuring R. Kelly and Mario)	2010	—	77	—	Crunk Rock
"Beautiful" (Alex Gaudino featuring Mario)	2013	—	—	—	Doctor Love
"Eyes On You" (Amy Steele featuring Mario)	2013	—	—	—	Non-album singles
"For Love" (THRDL!FE with Kelli-Leigh and Mario)	2017	—	—	—	Non-album singles
"Another Way" (Nitti Gritti featuring Mario)	2020	—	—	—	All In EP
"—" denotes a recording that did not chart or was not released in that territory.

=== Promotional singles ===
List of promotional singles, with selected chart positions, showing year released and album name
Title	Year	Peak chart positions		Album
Title	Year	US Adult R&B	US R&B	Album
"Do Right"	2007	—	—	Go
"Stranded"	2009	28	84	D.N.A.
"Fireball"	2015	—	—	Non-album singles
"Let Me Help You (Remix)" (featuring Kranium)	2017	—	—	Non-album singles
"Girl Like You / Dangerous Remix"	2018	—	—	Non-album singles
"—" denotes a recording that did not chart or was not released in that territory.

== Other charted songs ==
List of songs, with selected chart positions, showing year released and album name
Title	Year	Peak chart positions	Album
Title	Year	US	Album
"Ooh Baby"	2010	95	D.N.A.

== Guest appearances ==
List of non-single guest appearances, with other performing artists, showing year released and album name
Title	Year	Other performer(s)	Album
"Tameeka"	2001	Fabolous	Dr. Dolittle soundtrack
"Put Me On"	2002	none	Like Mike soundtrack
"I'll Move On"	2003	Bow Wow	Unleashed
"Kick It wit You"	2005	Cassidy	I'm a Hustla
"All Girls Cheat"	2006	Rhymefest	Blue Collar
"For the Love"	2006	Drew Sidora	Step Up (Original Soundtrack)
"Tell Me"	2007	Smitty, Chris Brown	none
"Born 2 Loose (Ohh)"	2008	Bohagon, Rock City	none
"Heaven Sent" (Remix)	2008	Keyshia Cole	none
"We Need to Roll" (Remix)	2008	Joe, Trey Songz	Signature
"That Look on Your Face"	2011	Boney James	Contact
"All the Way Gone"	2011	Game, Wale	The R.E.D. Album
"Eyes On You"	2013	Amy Steele	none
"DOA"	2015	Kid Ink	none
"For Love"	2017	THRDL!FE, Kelli-Leigh	none
"Feel Love"	2018	Jussie Smollett	Empire
"The Cry"	2019	Tory Lanez	Chixtape 5
"Why Not"	2019	Scotty Tovar, Yazz, Jussie Smollett, Melanie McCullogh, Opal Staples, Tisha Campbell	Empire
"Full Expousre"	2019	Serayah	Empire
"Do It Right"	2019	Katlynn Simone, Serayah McNeill, Yazz	Empire
"Slow Burn"	2019	Katlynn Simone	Empire
"Serious Interlude"	2022	Nas	King's Disease III
"Won't Keep You Waiting"	2024	Chris Brown	11:11 (Deluxe)

== Music videos ==
List of music videos, with directors, showing year released
Title	Year	Director(s)
"Just a Friend 2002"	2002	Diane Martel
"Braid My Hair"	2002	Bryan Barber
"C'mon" (version 1)	2003	Erik White
"C'mon" (version 2)	2004	Rick Murray
"Let Me Love You"	2004	Director X
"How Could You"	2005	Benny Boom
"Here I Go Again"	2005	Ray Kay
"Boom" (featuring Juvenile)	2005	Benny Boom
"How Do I Breathe"	2006	Melina
"Crying Out for Me"	2007	R. Malcolm Jones
"Do Right"	2007	Mario
"Break Up" (featuring Gucci Mane and Sean Garrett)	2009	Chris Robinson
"Thinkin' About You"	2009	Chris Robinson
"Ooh Baby"	2010	Mickey Finnegan
"Somebody Else" (featuring Nicki Minaj)	2013	Alexandre Moors
"I Need More"	2016	Ruby
"Let Me Help You"	2017	Meg Gamez, Mario
"Drowning"	2018	Mario
"Dancing Shadows"	2018	Mario
"Goes Like That"	2018	—N/a
"Care for You"	2019	Khufu Najee
"Closer" (Animated Visual)	2020	
"Mars"	2020	Mario, Sterling Hampton
"Pretty Mouth Magick"	2020	Mario, Sterling Hampton
"Luxury Love"	2021	Mario
"Like Her Too"	2023	Mario, Master Sterling
"Used To Me" (featuring Ty Dolla $ign)	2023	Toshihiko Nakago, Kazuaki Morita
"Main One" (with Lil Wayne featuring Tyga)	2023	BenMarc
"Space"	2024	Le3ay Studio
"Glad You Came"	2024	BenMarc
"Keep Going"	2025	BenMarc

=== As featured artist ===
List of music videos, with directors, showing year released
Title	Year	Director(s)
"That's How I Go" (Baby Bash featuring Lil Jon and Mario)	2009	Jeff Kennedy
"Choosin'" (Young Capone featuring Mario)	2009	Juwan Lee
"Headboard" (Hurricane Chris featuring Mario and Plies)	2009	David Rousseau
"Ms. Chocolate" (Lil Jon featuring R. Kelly and Mario)	2011	Mickey Finnegan
