= Xavier Lamar Truesdell =

American singer-songwriter (born 1985)

Xavier Truesdell
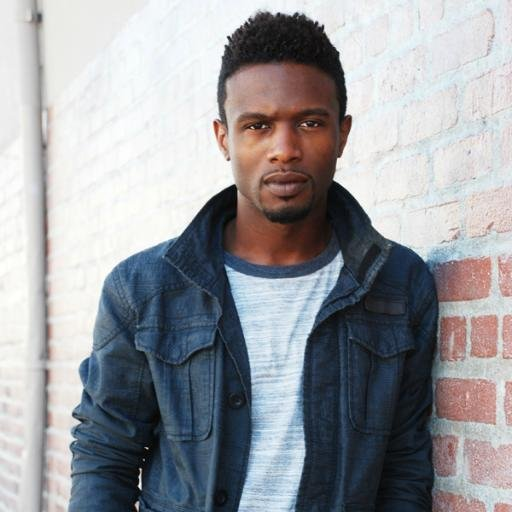
- Born: Xavier Lamar Truesdell; October 30, 1985 (age 40); Chicago, Illinois, United States
- Other name: XL
- Education: Los Angeles Film School
- Occupations: Actor; Model; Singer; Songwriter; On-Air Personality; Producer
- Years active: 2006–Present
- Musical career
- Genres: R&B; Pop
- Instrument: Vocals
- Website: xavierlt.com

Xavier Lamar Truesdell (born October 30, 1985, in Chicago, Illinois) also known as XL is an American actor, model, singer, songwriter, and producer. Truesdell made his debut on the pilot episode of the television drama series Las Vegas (2003). In 2008, he was the lead model in a national campaign for Toyota that was on national billboards and also featured in Ebony, Vibe, and Jet magazines. Truesdell has appeared on MTV reality shows Parental Control, Punk'd and the game show Identity. He also appeared in the films Miss Congeniality 2 (2005) and Star Trek Into Darkness (2013).

== Early life ==
Xavier Lamar Truesdell was born on October 30, 1985, in Chicago, Illinois. Truesdell started modeling in high school. At 17, he moved to Las Vegas, Nevada booking his first roles on the pilot episode of Las Vegas, and the comedy film Miss Congeniality 2. Truesdell was also featured in Michael Jackson’s music video, "One More Chance". Later that year, Truesdell played the role of Master Flo's (Coolio's) outargue in Three Days to Vegas.

== Career ==
In 2006, Truesdell moved to Los Angeles and appeared on MTV shows Parental Control, Next, Celebrity Exposed, Wild 'n Out, and Punk'd, which landed him on MTV'S Most Eligible Bachelors list. Truesdell has been in commercials and modeling campaigns for brands including Pepsi, KFC, Adidas, Nike, Toyota, Hanes, Volkswagen and Mediacom. In 2012, he was featured in Lady Gaga's Fame fragrance campaign. Truesdell also appeared on Rizzoli & Isles as a snake charmer. In 2013, he did stunt work and played the role of a U.S.S. Enterprise security guard in Star Trek Into Darkness.

In 2011, Truesdell was known by his initials XL while writing and co-producing his debut EP "Dance All Night" together with Dem Jointz. In 2014, Truesdell became the 1st African American music director and on-air personality for KOTM-FM aka Tom-FM hosting "The Morning Show," broadcasting in South East Iowa and Northern Missouri. He interviewed numerous celebrities like, The Broadway Boys, Max-D driver Morgan Kane, Tom Arnold, and Dustin Lynch. In 2015, Truesdell made appearances in music videos by Jordin Sparks, Christian Rich, and Big Sean. He was also featured in Florence and the Machine's "Third Eye," which is part of The Odyssey, a film directed by Vincent Haycock about the band. In 2017, Truesdell graduated from the Los Angeles Film School summa cum laude and was accepted into the National Society of the Entertainment Arts. In 2017, Truesdell was featured in 1800 Tequila's "Refined Lesson No. 1 - Tight" national commercial, In 2018, Truesdell was a featured haircut photo double for NBA basketball player Dennis Smith Jr. in the "Will Finds A Way" national Under Armour campaign. and he also did stunts in Jay Rock's "Win" music video by Dave Meyers (director).

== Filmography ==
=== Films ===
Year	Title	Role
2003	Miss Congeniality 2	Tourist
2007	Three Days to Vegas	Flo's Entourage
2013	Star Trek Into Darkness	U.S.S. Enterprise Security
2014	Favorite Refrain	FBI Agent Jenkins

=== Television ===
Year	Title	Role
2003	Las Vegas (TV series)	Competition Surfer, episode #1.1
2005	Punk'd	Contest Winner, episode #6.8
2006	Parental Control	Himself, episode #1.15
2006	Identity	Himself, episode #1.3
2007	Nip/Tuck	Mandingo Swinger, episode #5.5
2010	Rizzoli & Isles	Snake Charmer, episode #1.3
2012	NCIS: Los Angeles	Nigerian Driver, episode #3.15

=== Music videos ===
Year	Artist	Title
2003	Michael Jackson	"One More Chance"
2006	Mondo Marcio	"Dentro alla scatola"
2007	Fall Out Boy	"This Ain't A Scene, It's An Arms Race"
2007	Mario	"How Do I Breathe"
2008	Usher	"Love in This Club"
2010	Jason Derulo	"Whatcha Say"
2012	Eric Benét	"Real Love"
2013	The Neighbourhood	"Afraid"
2015	Big Sean	"I Know"
2015	Jordin Sparks	"They Don't Give"
2015	Christian Rich	"Compromise"
2016	Florence and The Machine	"Third Eye"
2017	XL	"Pose"
2018	Jay Rock	"Win"

== Discography ==
=== Album ===
- Dance All Night - 2012

=== Singles ===
- Dance All Night - written by Xavier L Truesdell, (2011), (performed by XL)
- Walk Away - written by Xavier L Truesdell, (2011), (performed by XL)
- Roleplay - written by Xavier L Truesdell, (2011), (performed by XL)
- Tonight - written by Xavier L Truesdell, (2012), (Performed by XL)
- New Car - written by Xavier L Truesdell, (2012), (Performed by XL)
- This Ain't Over - written by Xavier L Truesdell, (2012), (Performed by XL)
- My Mistakes - written by Xavier L Truesdell, (2016), (Performed by XL)
- Pose - written by Xavier L Truesdell, (2017), (Performed by XL)
- Fallin' For You - written by Xavier L Truesdell, (2017), (Performed by XL)
