= Fatal Distraction =

Fatal Distraction may refer to

- "Fatal Distraction" (Mario song)
- "Fatal Distraction" (Mayday), also titled "Who's at the Controls?", a 2008 television episode
- "Fatal Distraction" (Saved by the Bell), a 1989 television episode
- "Fatal Distraction: Forgetting a Child in the Backseat of a Car Is a Horrifying Mistake. Is It a Crime?", an article by Gene Weingarten of The Washington Post that won the 2010 Pulitzer Prize for Feature Writing
- Fatal Distraction, a 2011 show by magician Chris Cox
