= Drowning (Mario song) =

2018 single by Mario

Single by Mario

from the album Dancing Shadows
- Released: July 20, 2018
- Studio: FRQNCY Studios (London, England)
- Genre: R&B
- Length: 3:38
- Label: New Citizen; Empire
- Songwriters: Mario Barrett; Jake Gosling; Daecolm Holland; Milton Adams II; Yonatan Ayal
- Producers: Daecolm; Mario; xSDTRK

Mario singles chronology
| "Pain Is the New Pleasure" (2017) | "Drowning" (2018) | "Dancing Shadows" (2018) |

Music video
- "Drowning" on YouTube

"Drowning" is a song recorded by American recording artist Mario for his fifth studio album Dancing Shadows and was released alongside its music video on July 20, 2018, through his own label New Citizen and Empire Distribution as the album's lead single. The song was written and produced by Mario, xSDTRK and Daecolm Holland, with additional songwriting credits from Milton Adams II and Jake Gosling. Lyrically, the song is about a man being torn between two women.

The song garnered favorable reviews from most critics, with praise towards its production and Mario's vocal delivery

== Background and release ==
Mario spoke with the FunX radio station during the Oh My! Music Festival in June 2018, he revealed that he would release the lead single off the album.

== Critical reception ==
Singersroom said the song, "showcases Mario’s vocal growth and eargasmic falsetto that takes hold and doesn’t let go over a simmering and stark production". The Musical Hype gave the song three and a half stars out of five.

== Music video ==
The music video premiered along with the song on July 20, 2018.

== Live performances ==
Mario performed "Drowning" during the live televised segment of The Wendy Williams Show in October 2018.

== Track listing ==
Digital download
| No. | Title | Length |
|---|---|---|
| 1. | "Drowning" | 3:38 |

Digital download – Dance Remix
| No. | Title | Length |
|---|---|---|
| 1. | "Drowning (Nitti Gritti & Shndō Remix)" | 2:50 |

== Credits and personnel ==
Credits were adapted from Tidal.

- Mario – songwriting, production
- Daecolm – songwriting, production
- xSDTRK – songwriting, production
- Jake Gosling – songwriting
- Milton Adams II – songwriting

== Charts ==
Weekly chart performance for "Drowning"
| Chart (2018) | Peak position |
|---|---|
| US Adult R&B Songs (Billboard) | 28 |

== Release history ==
Release history and formats for "Drowning"
| Region | Date | Format | Label | Ref |
|---|---|---|---|---|
| Various | July 20, 2018 | Digital download | New Citizen; Empire | |
