= Mario (album) =

2002 studio album by Mario

Studio album by Mario
- Released: July 23, 2002
- Genre: R&B
- Length: 44:53
- Label: J
- Producer: Clive Davis (exec.); Peter Edge (exec.); Troy Patterson (exec.); Kerry Brothers, Jr.; Alicia Keys; Warryn Campbell; The Underdogs; Gérald Isaac; Amir Salaam; KL

Mario chronology
| Mario (2002) | Turning Point (2004) |

Singles from Mario
- 1. "Just a Friend 2002" Released: April 22, 2002; 2. "Braid My Hair" Released: September 7, 2002; 3. "C'Mon" Released: January 9, 2003

Mario is the debut studio album by American singer-songwriter Mario. It was released on July 23, 2002, by J Records. The album debuted at number 9 on the US Billboard 200, with first week sales of 96,000 copies and was eventually certified Gold by the Recording Industry Association of America (RIAA) for sales in excess of 500,000 copies in the United States. Mario was supported by three singles, including "Just a Friend 2002", "Braid My Hair" and "C'Mon".

== Promotion ==
In 2002, during rapper Bow Wow's tour, Mario was one of the opening act, alongside R.O.C. and Denim. In 2003, he also been on each tour alongside Nick Cannon, AJA, Jhené, Marques Houston and B2K, as one of the supporting acts for the 2003's Scream Tour III.

=== Singles ===
The debut single from the album, "Just a Friend 2002", a cover of Biz Markie's hit "Just a Friend", was released on May 4, 2002. Produced by Warryn Campbell, the song outperformed to its original, peaking at number 4 on the US Billboard Hot 100. It also reached at number 2 on the Hot R&B/Hip-Hop Songs, becoming Mario's second most successful single in the United States. "Just a Friend 2002" also reached at number 18 in the United Kingdom. "Braid My Hair" was released as the album's second single on September 7, 2002. Another Campbell production, it was less successful on the charts, peaking at number 74 on the US Billboard Hot 100, while reaching at number 18 on the Hot R&B/Hip-Hop Songs. Third and final single, "C'Mon" was released on January 9, 2003. It peaked at number 61 on the US Hot R&B/Hip-Hop Songs, and number 28 in the United Kingdom.

== Critical reception ==
Professional ratings
Review scores
| Source | Rating |
|---|---|
| AllMusic | 3/5 stars |
| Robert Christgau | (choice cut) |
| USA Today | 3/4 stars |

Dan LeRoy from AllMusic stated that the album "offers doses of the real thing; its combination of Nickelodeon-style charm and authentic substance are reminiscent of nothing so much as a young Michael Jackson, with none of the creepy subtext [...] Naturally, you have to excuse a certain amount of filler to believe fully in Mario's potential, but most of these 11 tracks offer generous hints of it." In his review for USA Today, Steve Jones noted that "Mario has a mature-for-his-age voice that sets him apart from the pack, even though he sticks with themes that don't make him seem older than he is [...] Radio-friendly grooves such as "Just a Friend" should get him immediate attention, but the soulful ballad "Never" suggests he's only scratching the surface of what he has to offer."

== Chart performance ==
Mario debuted and peaked at number 9 on the US Billboard 200 in the week of August 10, 2002, with first week sales of 96,000 copies. It also reached number three on the Top R&B/Hip-Hop Albums chart. On September 15, 2002, the album was certified Gold by the Recording Industry Association of America (RIAA) for sales in excess of 500,000 copies in the United States.

== Track listing ==
Mario track listing
| No. | Title | Writer(s) | Producer(s) | Length |
|---|---|---|---|---|
| 1. | "Just a Friend 2002" | Mario Barrett; Warryn Campbell; Harold Lilly; John "Jubu" Smith; Marcel Hall | W. Campbell | 3:36 |
| 2. | "C'Mon" | W. Campbell; Joi Campbell; Smith; Robert Ginyard, Jr. | W. Campbell | 3:24 |
| 3. | "Braid My Hair" | Barrett; W. Campbell; Lilly | W. Campbell | 4:07 |
| 4. | "2 Train" | Barrett; Kerry Brothers, Jr.; Paul Green; Alicia Augello Cook | Alicia Keys | 4:03 |
| 5. | "What Your Name Is" | Barrett; Damon Thomas; Harvey Mason, Jr.; Mischke | The Underdogs | 5:57 |
| 6. | "Holla Back" | Barrett; Thomas; Mason, Jr.; Mischke; Steve Russell | The Underdogs | 3:38 |
| 7. | "Could U Be" | Barrett; Mischke; Russell; Thomas; Mason, Jr. | The Underdogs | 4:07 |
| 8. | "Put Me On" | Barrett; Brother, Jr.; Bertram Reid; Woody Cunningham; Norman Durham; Ronald Miller; Cook | Brother, Jr. | 3:39 |
| 9. | "Chick wit da Braids" | Barrett; Gérald Isaac | Isaac | 3:50 |
| 10. | "Never" | Barrett; Isaac | Isaac | 3:59 |
| 11. | "Girl in the Picture" | Barrett; Anthony Akiens; Kevin "KL" Lewis; Daniel Mickens; Amir Salaam | Salaam; KL | 4:35 |
| Total length: | | | | 44:53 |

Japanese bonus track
| No. | Title | Writer(s) | Producer(s) | Length |
|---|---|---|---|---|
| 12. | "Just a Friend 2002 (Old School version)" | Barrett; W. Campbell; Lilly; Smith; Hall | W. Campbell | 3:36 |

Sample credits

- "C'Mon" contains elements from "Think (About It)" as performed by Lyn Collins and "It Takes Two" as performed by Rob Base and DJ E-Z Rock.
- "Put Me On" contains a sample of "I'll Do Anything for You" as performed by Denroy Morgan.

== Personnel ==
- Mario – vocals, background vocals
- Manny Marroquin – mixing
- Tony Maserati – mixing
- Ben Arondale – mixing
- Tony Black – mixing
- Jon Gass – mixing
- Mischke – arranger, background vocals, vocal producer
- Alicia Keys – background vocals, instrumentation
- John Jubu Smith – guitar
- Neil Stubenhaus – bass
- Jan Fairchild – engineer
- Dave Russell – engineer
- Thor Laewe – engineer
- Jeff Allen – engineer
- Tony Black – engineer
- Xavier Marquez – guitar
- Erik Steinert – pro-tools
- Troy Patterson – executive producer
- Peter Edge – executive producer
- Clive Davis – executive producer
- Ronald B. Gillyard – A&R
- Larry Jackson – A&R
- Michael Lavine – photography
- Chris LeBeau – photo production
- Gregory Burke – cover
- June Ambrose – stylist
- Jolie Levine-Aller – production coordination
- Sandra Campbell – project coordination
- Warryn Campbell – instrumentation

== Charts ==
=== Weekly charts ===
Weekly chart performance for Mario
| Chart (2002) | Peak position |
|---|---|
| Canadian Albums (Nielsen SoundScan) | 78 |
| Canadian R&B Albums (Nielsen SoundScan) | 15 |
| US Billboard 200 | 9 |
| US Top R&B/Hip-Hop Albums (Billboard) | 3 |

=== Year-end charts ===
Year-end chart performance for Mario
| Chart (2002) | Position |
|---|---|
| Canadian R&B Albums (Nielsen SoundScan) | 146 |
| US Billboard 200 | 169 |
| US Top R&B/Hip-Hop Albums (Billboard) | 58 |

== Certifications ==
Certifications for Mario
| Region | Certification | Certified units/sales |
|---|---|---|
| United States (RIAA) | Gold | 500,000^{^} |
^{^} Shipments figures based on certification alone.

== Release history ==
Mario release history
| Region | Date | Format | Label | Ref(s) |
|---|---|---|---|---|
| United States | July 23, 2002 | CD; digital download | J Records | |
| Japan | September 25, 2002 | CD; digital download | BMG Japan | |
