= Three Days to Vegas =

- Directed by: Charlie Picerni
- Written by: Michael Pietzrak; Jon Warner; Charlie Picerni
- Starring: Peter Falk; Rip Torn; George Segal; Bill Cobbs; Billy Burke; Nancy Young; Chris Diamantopoulos; Taylor Negron; Mario Cantone; Coolio; Reginald VelJohnson; Charlie Murphy
- Cinematography: Tom Priestley Jr.
- Release date: 2007
- Running time: 99 minutes
- Country: United States

Three Days to Vegas is a 2007 American comedy film directed by Charlie Picerni and starring Peter Falk, Rip Torn, George Segal, and Bill Cobbs. The story follows four elderly male retirees who take a road trip to Las Vegas to stop the impending marriage of one of their daughters, played by Nancy Young. Cobbs replaced iconic actor Ossie Davis in the cast after Davis died during production. The film features various prominent actors in supporting roles, including Billy Burke, Chris Diamantopoulos, Reginald VelJohnson, and Taylor Negron.

== Cast ==
- Peter Falk as Gus 'Fitzy' Fitzgerald
- Rip Torn as Joe Wallace
- George Segal as Dominic Spinuzzi
- Bill Cobbs as Marvin Jeffries
- Billy Burke as Billy
- Nancy Young as Elizabeth Fitzgerald
- Chris Diamantopoulos as Laurent Perrier
- Taylor Negron as Antoine
- Mario Cantone as Chris
- Coolio as The Flow
- Charlie Murphy as Andre
- Reginald VelJohnson as RJ Jackson
- Xavier Truesdell as Flo's Entourage
