= Dance All Night (album) =

Studio album by XL
- Released: May 21, 2012
- Recorded: 2010–12
- Genres: R&B; pop
- Length: 22:00
- Label: XL
- Producers: Dem Jointz; Xavier Lamar Truesdell

Singles from Dance All Night
- 1. "Walk Away (Get To Know Me)" Released: March 20, 2011; 2. "Dance All Night" Released: May 2011; 3. "Tonight" Released: 2012

Dance All Night is the debut studio album by American singer XL. The entire album was written by Truesdell and produced by Dem Jointz.

== Singles ==
"Walk Away (Get To Know Me)" was released as the album's lead single on March 20, 2011. The second single, "Dance All Night", was released in May 2012. "Tonight" was released as the album's third single in the fall of 2012. It became the album's most successful single, peaking in the top 100 on the ReverbNation R&B/Soul chart.

== Track listing ==
No.	Title	Writer(s)	Producer(s)	Length
1.	"Dance All Night"	Xavier Lamar Truesdell	Dem Jointz	3:40
2.	"Walk Away (Get To Know Me)"	Xavier Lamar Truesdell	Dem Jointz	3:58
3.	"Roleplay"	Xavier Lamar Truesdell; Dem Jointz	Dem Jointz	3:07
4.	"Tonight"	Xavier Lamar Truesdell	Dem Jointz	3:27
5.	"This Ain't Over"	Xavier Lamar Truesdell; Dem Jointz	Dem Jointz	4:57
6.	"Roleplay (Remix)"	Xavier Lamar Truesdell; F. Millionaire	Dem Jointz	3:31

== Personnel ==
Credits for Dance All Night adapted from BMI.

- Dem Jointz - composer, executive producer, writer, engineer, mixing, mastering
- F. Millionaire - performer
- Xavier Lamar Truesdell - art direction, co-producer, writer

== Music video ==
"Dance All Night" music video was released on YouTube on May 24, 2011 and was directed by Jacob Jades.

== Chart positions ==
Chart (2012)	Peak position
ReverbNation - Los Angeles	3
