= Fatal Distraction (Mario song) =

Single by Mario
- Released: September 10, 2013
- Recorded: August 2011; Strip - chris brown song, mario
- Length: 3:45
- Label: RCA
- Songwriters: Mario Barrett; Guordan Banks; Francis Ayden George; Roosevelt Harrell; Jessyca Wilson
- Producers: Guordan Banks; Bink; Jessyca Wilson

Mario singles chronology
"Somebody Else" (2013)	"Fatal Distraction" (2013)	"Forever" (2015)

"Fatal Distraction" is a song by American singer Mario. It was written by Mario along with Guordan Banks, Francis Ayden George, Roosevelt "Bink" Harrell, and Jessyca Wilson, while production was helmed by Banks, Harrell, and Wilson. The song was released by RCA Records as a digital single on September 10, 2013. Intended to serve as the second single for Mario's then-upcoming fifth studio album Evolve, it was later demote due to Mario scrapping the whole album and departing from the label.

== Background ==
"Fatal Distraction" was written by Mario, Guordan Banks, Francis Ayden George, Roosevelt "Bink" Harrell, and Jessyca Wilson. Production on the track was overseen by Banks, Harrell, and Wilson. Cited by Mario as one of his favorite tracks for what was then planned to be released as his fifth studio album Evolve, "Fatal Distraction" was inspired by his relationship with Dez, his manager's ex-girlfriend when he was 22. Commenting on the track, he said: "Everybody has heard about a fatal attraction but we decided to do it differently. The record is about wanting something so bad and not being able to have it the way you want it and having that be a distraction to you." He further described the song as an "alternative R&B record." While he initially announced that rapper J. Cole would be featured on "Fatal Distraction," Cole did not appeared on it.

== Chart performance ==
"Fatal Distraction" debuted on the US Adult R&B Songs in the week of October 12, 2013, becoming Mario's first entry on the chart since "Music for Love" (2008). It eventually peaked at number 35 two weeks later. The song failed to chart elsewhere.

== Track listing ==
Digital single
No.	Title	Writer(s)	Producer(s)	Length
1.	"Fatal Distraction"	Mario Barrett; Francis Ayden George; Guordan Banks; Jessyca Wilson; Roosevelt Harrell	Banks; Wilson; Bink	3:43

== Credits and personnel ==
Credits lifted from the liner notes of "Fatal Distraction."

- Alrenzo Albritton – keyboards
- David Balford – keyboards
- Mario Barrett – vocals, writer
- Guordan Banks – producer, writer
- Francis Ayden George – writer
- Trey Harris – assistant engineer
- Roosevelt Harrell – producer, writer
- Jaycen Joshua – mixing engineer
- Jessyca Wilson – producer, writer

== Charts ==
Weekly chart performance for "Fatal Distraction"
Chart (2013)	Peak position
US Adult R&B Songs (Billboard)	35

== Release history ==
Release dates for "Fatal Distraction"
Region	Date	Format(s)	Label(s)	Ref.
United States	September 10, 2013	Digital download	RCA Records	
