= C'Mon (Mario song) =

Single by Mario

from the album Mario
- Released: January 14, 2003
- Length: 3:24
- Label: 3rd Street; J
- Songwriters: Joi Campbell; Warryn Campbell; John "Jubu" Smith; Robert Ginyard, Jr.
- Producer: Warryn Campbell

Mario singles chronology
| "Braid My Hair" (2002) | "C'Mon" (2003) | "Let Me Love You" (2004) |

"C'Mon" is a song by American singer Mario. It was written by John "Jubu" Smith, Joi Campbell and her brother Warryn Campbell for his debut studio album Mario (2002), while production was helmed by the latter. The song contains elements from "Think (About It)" (1972) by soul singer Lyn Collins as well as excperts from "It Takes Two" (1988) by hip hop duo Rob Base and DJ E-Z Rock. Due to the excerpts, Base is also credited as a songwriter under his birth name Robert Ginyard. "C'Mon" was released as the album's third and final single on January 14, 2003.

== Music video ==
The music video for "C'Mon," directed by Erik White, shows Mario dancing with backup dancers.

== Track listing ==
CD single
| No. | Title | Writer(s) | Producer(s) | Length |
|---|---|---|---|---|
| 1. | "C'Mon" (album version) | Joi Campbell; Warryn Campbell; John "Jubu" Smith; Robert Ginyard, Jr. | W. Campbell | 3:35 |
| 2. | "C'Mon" (Just Blaze radio mix) | J. Campbell; W. Campbel; Smith; James Brown; Fred Wesley | W. Campbell; Just Blaze^{[a]} | 3:50 |
| 3. | "C'Mon" (Stargate radio mix) | J. Campbell; W. Campbel; Smith | W. Campbell; Stargate^{[a]} | 3:23 |
| 4. | "C'Mon" (video) | | | 3:50 |

12-inch remix single
| No. | Title | Writer(s) | Producer(s) | Length |
|---|---|---|---|---|
| 1. | "C'Mon" (Just Blaze radio mix) | J. Campbell; W. Campbell; Smith; Brown; Wesley | W. Campbell; Just Blaze^{[a]} | 3:50 |
| 2. | "C'Mon" (Stargate radio mix) | J. Campbell; W. Campbell; Smith | W. Campbell; Stargate^{[a]} | 3:23 |

Notes

- ^{^[a]} signifies a remix producer

Sample crdits

- The album version of "C'Mon" contains elements from "Think (About It)" by Lyn Collins and "It Takes Two" by Rob Base and DJ E-Z Rock.
- The Just Blaze radio mix of "C'Mon" contains excerpts from "Blues and Pants" as written by James Brown and Fred Wesley.

== Charts ==
=== Weekly charts ===
Weekly chart performance for "C'Mon"
| Chart (2003) | Peak position |
|---|---|
| Europe (European Hot 100 Singles) | 87 |
| Scotland Singles (OCC) | 69 |
| UK Singles (OCC) | 28 |
| UK Hip Hop/R&B (OCC) | 8 |
| US Hot R&B/Hip-Hop Songs (Billboard) | 61 |
| US Pop Airplay (Billboard) | 37 |
| US Rhythmic Airplay (Billboard) | 34 |

=== Year-end charts ===
Year-end chart performance for "C'Mon"
| Chart (2003) | Position |
|---|---|
| UK Urban (Music Week) | 20 |

== Release history ==
Release history and formats for "C'Mon"
| Region | Date | Format(s) | Label(s) | Ref. |
|---|---|---|---|---|
| United States | November 18, 2002 | Contemporary hit · rhythmic contemporary radio | J | |
| United States | February 3, 2003 | Urban contemporary radio | J | |
