= Glad You Came (album) =

Studio album by Mario
- Released: December 13, 2024
- Length: 36:16
- Labels: New Citizen; Epic
- Producers: A1; Chris Bhikoo; Bnyx; Craig Brockman; Chiiild; Daoud; James Fauntleroy; KDDO; Mario; Chris McCorkle; P2J; Leon Thomas; Pop Wansel

Mario chronology
Closer to Mars (2020)	Glad You Came (2024)	Mood Swings (2025)

Singles from Glad You Came
- 1. "Space" Released: September 27, 2024; 2. "Glad You Came" Released: November 8, 2024; 3. "Keep Going (Aaaaahhhhh)" Released: December 13, 2024

Glad You Came is the sixth studio album by American singer-songwriter Mario, it was released on December 13, 2024, through his New Citizen imprint with distribution from Epic Records. This is his first studio effort since Dancing Shadows (2018) and his first album under a major label since D.N.A. (2009).

== Singles ==
The album's lead single "Space" was released on September 27, 2024. It has reached number 20 on the Adult R&B Songs chart. The title track was released as the second single on November 8, 2024. "Keep Going (Aaaaahhhhh)" was released as the third single on the same day as the album. With the song, Mario achieved his first top 10 hit on the Adult R&B Airplay chart in 20 years and his second overall behind "Let Me Love You".

== Artwork ==
The cover art features a photograph of Mario standing against a mirrored wall in a room with decor reminiscent of the 1970s. The singer gives a seductive stare into the camera as he holds a vintage, red rotary telephone in one hand while the cord and receiver hang around his neck.

== Track listing ==
Glad You Came track listing
No.	Title	Writer(s)	Producer(s)	Length
1.	"Space"	Mario Barrett; James Fauntleroy; Benjamin Fort	Bnyx	3:48
2.	"Questions"	Barrett; Fauntleroy; Fort; Floyd Bentley; Christopher McCorkle; Chad Hugo; Pharrell Williams; Leon Thomas; Deavon Petty Chisolm; Michael Tyler	Bnyx; A1; Thomas; McCorkle	3:29
3.	"Glad You Came"	Barrett; Fauntleroy; Quintin Gulledge	Fauntleroy; Gulledge^{[a]}	2:26
4.	"You 101"	Barrett; Fauntleroy; Gulledge; Andrew Wansel	Pop Wansel	2:51
5.	"Play Fair"	Barrett; Fauntleroy; Richard Isong; Daoud Anthony	P2J; Daoud	2:49
6.	"I'm Sorry"	Barrett; Fauntleroy; Craig Brockman	Fauntleroy; Brockman	1:28
7.	"Love Callin (Interlude)"	Barrett; Elijah Fox; Rebekah Fuerst	Mario	1:15
8.	"Keep Going (Aaaaahhhhh)"	Barrett; Fauntleroy; Yonatan Ayal	Chiiild	2:49
9.	"Selfish"	Barrett; Fauntleroy; Fort; Grant Lapointe	Bnyx; Dre Moon^{[c]}	3:18
10.	"Love Ain't Perfect"	Barrett; Fauntleroy; Fort	Bnyx	2:55
11.	"Give It to You"	Barrett; Fort; McCorkle; Fox	Bnyx; Chris Bhikoo; McCorkle^{[a]}	2:11
12.	"Run It Back"	Barrett; Fauntleroy; Ayoola Agboola	Fauntleroy; KDDO	3:06
13.	"Mantra"	Barrett; Agboola; Owen J. Wiebe	KDDO; Wiebe^{[a]}	3:51
Total length:				36:16

Notes

- ^{^[c]} signifies a co-producer
- ^{^[a]} signifies an additional producer

== Personnel ==
- Mario – vocals (all tracks), engineering (tracks 2, 4, 5, 7, 10, 11)
- Jaycen Joshua – mastering, mixing
- Mike Seaberg – mixing
- Dylan Del Olmo – engineering (tracks 1–6, 8–10, 12)
- Marcus Garcia – engineering (tracks 1, 3, 4, 6, 12)
- Shareef Rupert – engineering (tracks 2, 5, 8, 12, 13)
- A. "Bainz" Bains – engineering (track 12)
- Jacob Richards – engineering assistance
- Chris Bhikoo – engineering assistance (tracks 1–10, 12)

== Release history ==
Release history for Glad You Came
Region	Date	Format(s)	Label	Ref.
Various	December 13, 2024	CD; digital download; streaming	New Citizen; Epic	
Various	February 14, 2025	Vinyl LP	New Citizen; Epic	
