= Somebody Else (Mario song) =

Single by Mario featuring Nicki Minaj
- Released: May 21, 2013
- Genre: R&B
- Length: 4:09
- Label: 3rd Street; RCA
- Songwriters: Mario Barrett; Jeremiah Bethea; Jamal Jones; Onika Tanya Maraj; Marvin E. Smith; William Tyler; Cory McWilliams
- Producers: Polow Da Don; Anomaly

Mario singles chronology
"The Walls" (2011)	"Somebody Else" (2013)	"Fatal Distraction" (2013)

Nicki Minaj singles chronology
"High School" (2013)	"Somebody Else" (2013)	"I'm Out" (2013)

Music video
- "Somebody Else" on YouTube

"Somebody Else" is a song by the American R&B singer Mario, featuring guest vocals from rapper Nicki Minaj. It was written by Mario and Minaj along with William "Anomaly" Tyler, Jeremiah Bethea, Cory McWilliams, and Jamal Jones, while production was helmed by Tyler and Polow. The upbeat tempo record heavily samples the 1975 song "Remember the Rain" by American R&B group 21st Century. Due to the sample, Marvin E. Smith is also credited as a songwriter.

The song was released digitally by RCA Records on May 21, 2013. It earned largely positive reviews and peaked at number 36 on the US Hot R&B/Hip-Hop Songs chart. A music video for the song, directed by Alexandre Moore, was filmed in New York City in May 2013 and premiered in July 2013. "Somebody Else" was intended to serve as lead single for Mario's then-upcoming fifth studio album Evolve, but would remain a standalone single due to Mario scrapping the whole album and departing from the label.

== Background ==
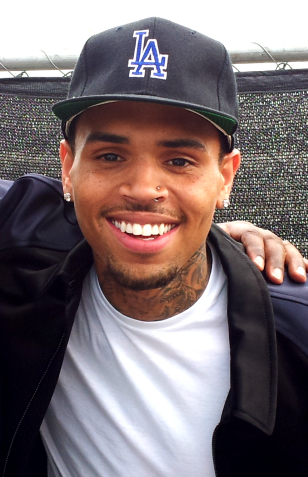
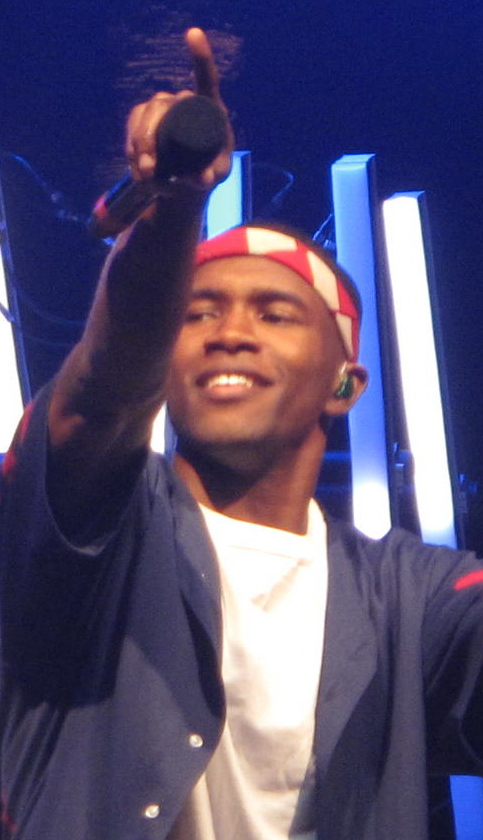
American R&B singers Chris Brown (left) and Frank Ocean (right) both recorded demos of the song, prior to Mario making it his single.

"Somebody Else" was written by Mario, Nicki Minaj, William Tyler, Jeremiah Bethea, Cory McWilliams, and Polow da Don, while production was overseen by produced by Polow and Tyler. The song is an upbeat tempo track featuring thumbing percussion, with hip-hop influences and sampled vocals in the hook. R&B singer-songwriter Frank Ocean recorded a demo of the song as did Chris Brown who considered the song for his fifth studio album Fortune (2012). In an interview with MTV News, Mario commented on Minaj's appearance on "Somebody Else": "I feel like Nicki fit the same characteristics of the track. Being from New York, being grungy, but at the same time understanding taste and prestige and also being a great lyricist and being able to represent a brand."

== Critical reception ==
"Somebody Else" was praised by music critics. RnB Magazine called it "hot music" and a summer hit. ThisisRnB acclaimed Minaj's verse and Polow Da Don's production, calling those "impressive" and "infectious", respectively.

== Commercial performance ==
Intended to serve as the lead single from Mario's fifth studio album Evolve, following the cancellation of Restoration, a Rico Love-produced album that he had planned to release under J Records before the label was dissolved into RCA Records in 2011, "Somebody Else" was released digitally by RCA on May 21, 2013. It debuted on the US Hot R&B/Hip-Hop Songs chart on the week of July 13, 2013 and eventually peaked at number 36 on August 24. The song became a standalone single after Mario managed to get out of his deal with RCA Records, leaving Evolve unreleased.

== Music video ==
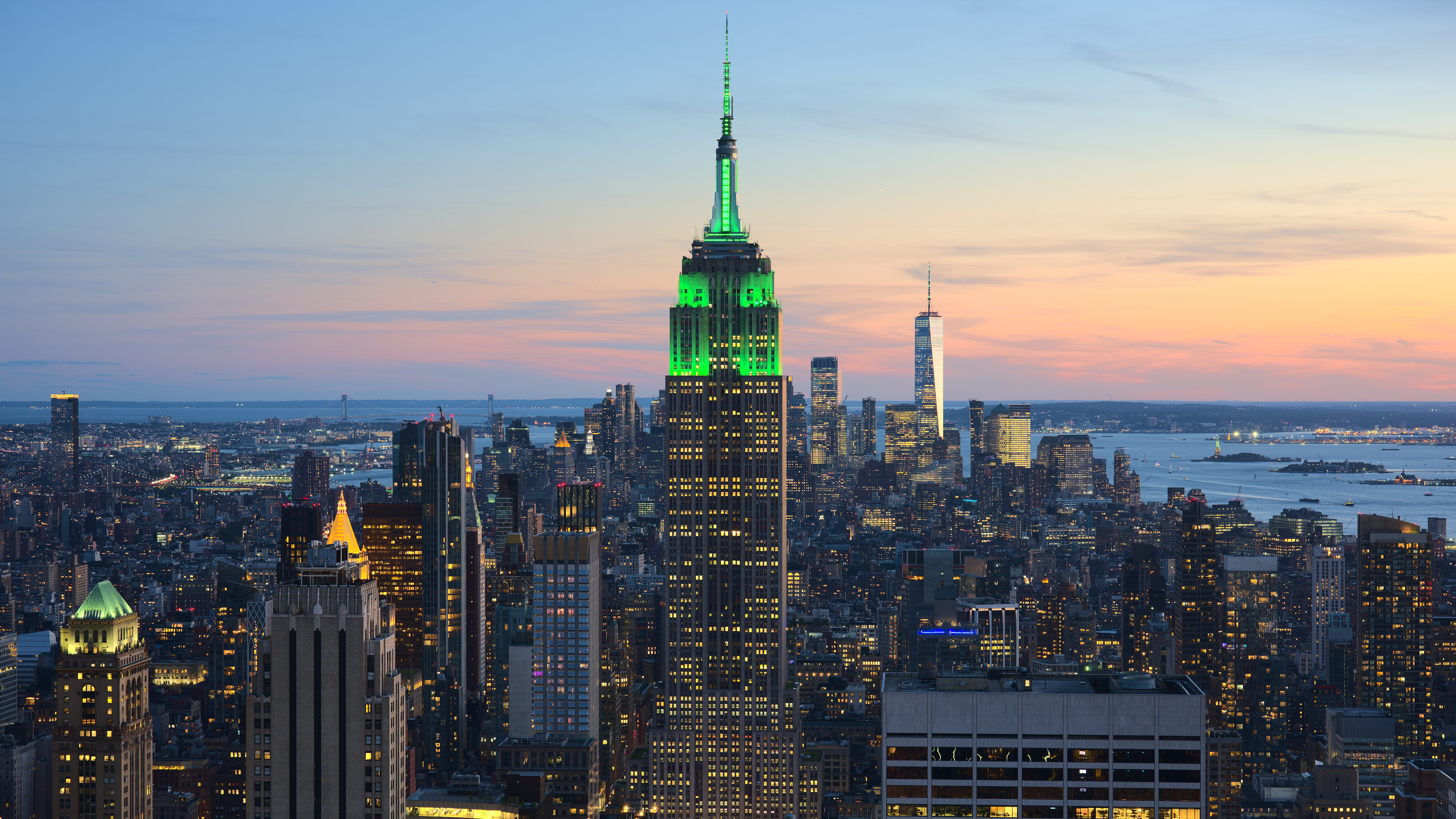
The music video for "Somebody Else," directed by Alexandre Moore, was filmed in New York City in May 2013.

A music video for "Somebody Else" was filmed on a soundstage in New York on May 25, 2013. While he had different ideas for the shoot, Mario and his team eventually went with the one that accommodated the Minaj's schedule, telling MTV News: "I had three or four concepts for the video because I didn't wanna do the typical 'cheat on your girl and she walks in the house and catches you' type of thing. I wanted there to be more shock value. I wanted it to feel like a movie and to feel cinematic. I had another script that was more prestigious. I would say, in terms of how I wanted to shoot it and where, but this just made more sense because Nicki was in the New York at the time," shooting Nick Cassavetes's romantic comedy The Other Woman (2014).

"Somebody Else" chronicles" the dramatic ending of a relationship as Mario and Minaj square off in the video." In the visuals, the pair pose back to back, with Minaj and Mario wearing a black-and-gold outfit and a vest and tie, respectively. Minaj filmed her solo shot in front of an open window overlooking New York City at night. "Somebody Else" premiered on July 8, 2013 on MTV Jams and debuted two days later on BET's countdown show 106 & Park.

== Track listing ==
- Digital download
1. "Somebody Else" (featuring Nicki Minaj) - 4:09

== Credits and personnel ==
Credits lifted from the liner notes of "Somebody Else."

- Mario Barrett – vocals, writer
- Jeremiah Bethea – writer
- Dan Cohen – recording engineer
- Trey Harris – assistant engineer
- Jaycen Joshua – mixing engineer
- Nicki Minaj – vocals, writer
- Polow da Don – producer, writer
- Kendall Scott – recording engineer
- Marvin E. Smith – writer (sample)
- William "Anomaly" Tyler – producer, writer
- Cory McWilliams – writer

== Charts ==
Weekly chart performance for "Somebody Else"
Chart (2013)	Peak position
US Bubbling Under Hot 100 (Billboard)	4
US Hot R&B/Hip-Hop Songs (Billboard)	36
US Hot R&B Songs (Billboard)	12
US Rhythmic Airplay (Billboard)	32

== Release history ==
Release dates for "Somebody Else"
Region	Date	Format(s)	Label(s)	Ref.
United States	May 21, 2013	Digital download	RCA Records	
