= Just a Friend 2002 =

2002 single by Mario

Single by Mario

from the album Mario
- Released: April 22, 2002
- Genre: R&B
- Length: 3:34
- Label: J
- Songwriters: Warryn Campbell; Harold Lilly; Biz Markie; John Smith
- Producer: Warryn Campbell

Mario singles chronology
"Just a Friend 2002" (2002)	"Braid My Hair" (2002)

Music video
- "Just a Friend 2002" on YouTube

"Just a Friend 2002" is a song by American singer Mario. It was written by Warryn Campbell, Harold Lilly, and John "Jubu" Smith and recorded for Mario's self-titled debut album (2002). Produced by Campbell, the song is a loose cover of Biz Markie's hit single "Just a Friend" (1989). Due to the interpolation Markie is also credited as a songwriter on "Just a Friend 2002". Mario's version is different, as the story is changed from a man who discovers his girlfriend has been cheating on him to a story about unrequited love.

J Records released the song in April 2002 as Mario's debut single. "Just a Friend 2002" peaked at number four on the US Billboard Hot 100 chart in August 2002. It also reached number three on the US Hot R&B/Hip-Hop Singles & Tracks chart, number five on the UK Hip Hop/R&B Chart, and number eight on the Canadian Singles Chart. In promotion of the song, J Records released a music video which had been filmed by director Diane Martel in Mario's hometown of Baltimore, Maryland.

== Background ==
"Just a Friend 2002" was written by Warryn "Baby Dubb" Campbell, Harold Lilly, and John "Jubu" Smith and initially recorded by R&B singer Usher during the production of his unreleased third studio album All About U. Though he was due to film a music video for the song, the album was eventually shelved and Usher passed on the song. It was instead given to Mario after Campbell convinced J Records head Clive Davis that "Just a Friend" would fit the singer's debut album, though Davis requested Campbell to "add another part, like a breakdown" to the song. The chorus of "Just a Friend 2002" contains interpolations from rapper Biz Markie's 1989 song "Just a Friend." The song also contains an instrumental sample from American hip hop group Run–DMC's "Sucker M.C.'s" (1983).

== Critical reception ==
Billboard remarked that Mario's "smooth, confident vocals mesh well with the sparse breakbeat provided by Warryn "Baby Dubb" Campbell." The magazine felt that "the combination of old-school nostalgia and new-school flavor makes the single click." In his review of parent album Mario, Dan LeRoy from AllMusic stated that "while it misses out on the humor of the original, the cover of Biz Markie's "Just a Friend" proves a shrewd update of the unwillingly platonic classic, and serves as a gateway to better originals." LeRoy ranked the song among his favorites on the album. In a retrospective review, Tom Breihan from Stereogum, alluding to the Markie original, wrote: "The whole idea of a smoothly, sweetly sung version of "Just a Friend” seems utterly absurd. Like: why? But that hook still worked even in Mario’s hands." Rolling Stone listed it as the 61st best R&B song of the 21st century.

== Chart performance ==
"Just a Friend 2002" debuted at number 88 on the US Billboard Hot 100 in the week of May 25, 2002. It eventually peaked at number four in the week ending August 24, 2002, spending 21 weeks on the chart. Billboard ranked it 34th on the chart's 2002 year-end ranking. "Just a Friend 2002" also reached number three on the US Hot R&B/Hip-Hop Singles & Tracks chart and number eight on the Rhythmic Top 40 chart. Elsewhere, the song entered the top 10 in Canada, peaking at number eight on the Canadian Singles Chart, while also reaching number 15 on the New Zealand Singles Chart and number 18 on the UK Singles Chart. "Just a Friend 2002" also became a top five hit on the UK Hip Hop/R&B Chart.

== Music video ==
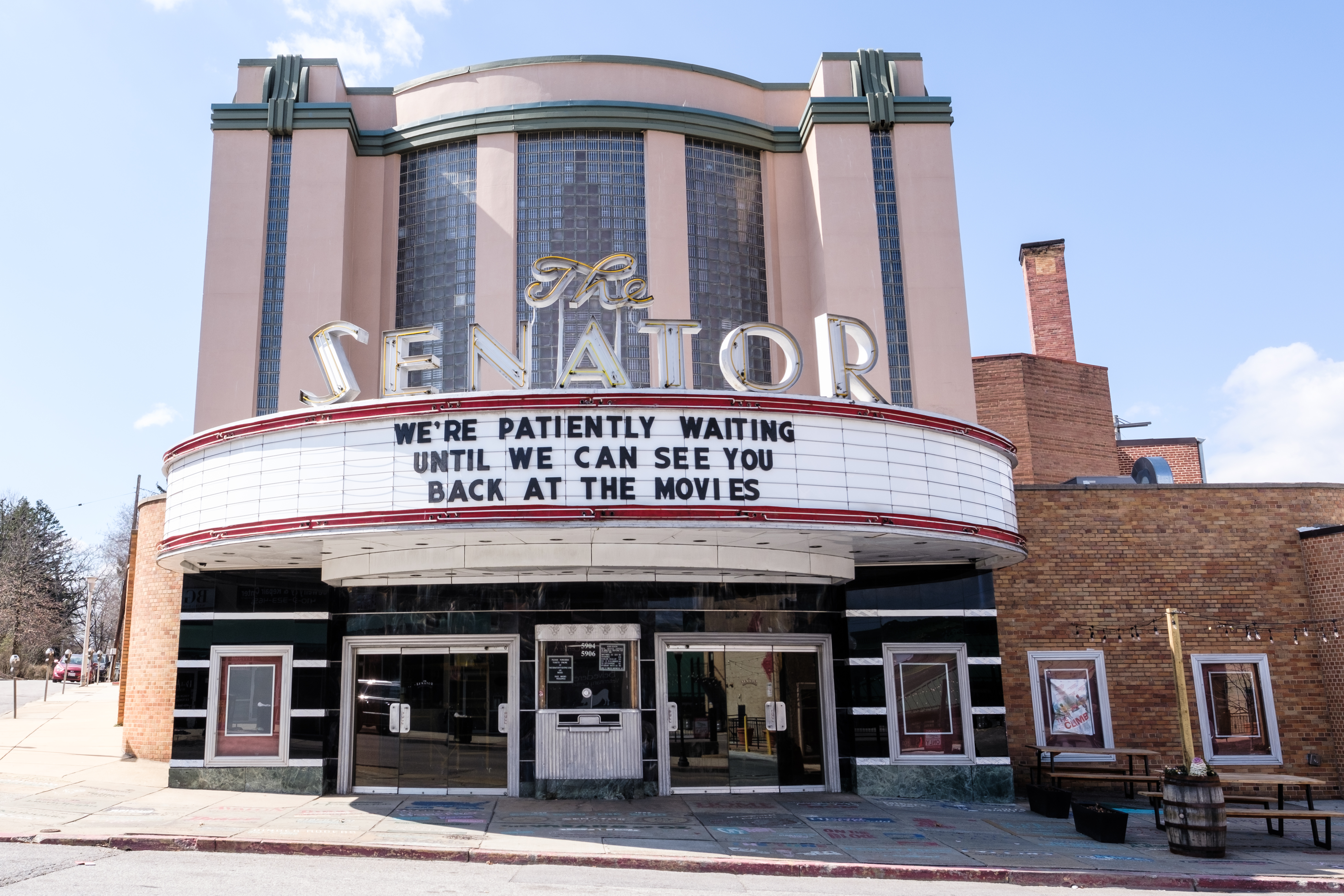
Portions of "Just a Friend 2002" were filmed at the Senator Theatre.

A music video for "Just a Friend 2002" was directed by Diane Martel. It was shot on April 7–8, 2002 in Mario's hometown of Baltimore, Maryland. The visuals feature Mario, wearing a Baltimore Ravens jersey, visiting a girl while his friends want to see her as well. While following her down the street, they lead to a movie theater where she is found, and Mario excites her with dance. Biz Markie can be heard in the beginning of the video and is seen in parts of the theater sequeneces, which were filmed at the Senator Theatre, a historic Art Deco movie theater on York Road in the Govans section of Baltimore. American singer-dancer Cassie Ventura is also featured briefly in this video.

== Track listings ==
US CD single

1. "Just a Friend 2002" (radio edit)
2. "Just a Friend 2002" (Old School mix featuring Biz Markie)
3. "Just a Friend 2002" (album version)

US 7-inch single

A. "Just a Friend 2002" (radio edit) – 3:34
B. "Just a Friend 2002" (Biz Markie version) – 4:36

UK CD and 12-inch single

1. "Just a Friend 2002" (radio edit) – 3:35
2. "Just a Friend 2002" (5AM mix) – 3:39
3. "Braid My Hair" – 4:06

European CD single

1. "Just a Friend 2002" (radio edit) – 3:35
2. "Just a Friend 2002" (Old School mix featuring Biz Markie) – 4:36

== Personnel ==
Personnel are lifted from the liner notes of Mario.

- Mario Barrett – vocals
- Sandra Campbell – project coordinator
- Warryn Campbell – producer, writer
- Jan Fairchild – recording engineer
- Harold Lilly – writer
- Biz Markie – writer (sample)
- Manny Marroquin – mixing engineer
- John "Jubu" Smith – guitar, writer

== Charts ==
=== Weekly charts ===
Weekly chart performance for "Just a Friend 2002"
Chart (2002–2003)	Peak position
Australian Urban (ARIA)	22
Canada (Nielsen SoundScan)	8
Europe (Eurochart Hot 100)	68
Netherlands (Single Top 100)	70
New Zealand (Recorded Music NZ)	15
Scotland Singles (Official Charts)	44
UK Singles (Official Charts)	18
UK Hip Hop/R&B (Official Charts)	5
US Billboard Hot 100	4
US Hot R&B/Hip-Hop Songs (Billboard)	3
US Pop Airplay (Billboard)	6
US Rhythmic Airplay (Billboard)	8

=== Year-end charts ===
Year-end chart performance for "Just a Friend 2002"
Chart (2002)	Position
Canada (Nielsen SoundScan)	79
US Billboard Hot 100	34
US Hot R&B/Hip-Hop Singles & Tracks (Billboard)	31
US Mainstream Top 40 (Billboard)	48
US Rhythmic Top 40 (Billboard)	24

== Release history ==
Release dates and formats for "Just a Friend 2002"
Region	Date	Format(s)	Label(s)	Ref.
United States	April 22, 2002	Rhythmic contemporary; urban radio	J	
New Zealand	October 7, 2002	CD	J	
Australia	October 14, 2002	CD	J	
United Kingdom	March 31, 2003	12-inch vinyl; CD; cassette	J	
