= How Do I Breathe =

Single by Mario

from the album Go
- Released: May 15, 2007
- Genre: R&B
- Length: 3:36
- Label: 3rd Street; J; Epic
- Songwriters: Mario Barrett; Mikkel Storleer Eriksen; Tor Erik Hermansen; Phil "Taj" Jackson
- Producer: Stargate

Mario singles chronology
"Boom" (2005)	"How Do I Breathe" (2007)	"Crying Out for Me" (2007)

"How Do I Breathe" is a song recorded by American singer Mario. It was written by Mario along with Phil "Taj" Jackson as well as Ne-Yo and Tor Erik Hermansen from production duo Stargate for his third studio album Go (2007), while production was helmed by Eriksen and Hermansen.

Released as the album's lead single on May 15, 2007, "How Do I Breathe" earned largely positive reviews. While it became a top 20 hit in the Netherlands and New Zealand, the song was less successful in the United States, where it peaked at number 46 on the Billboard Hot 100. The official remix of the song features rapper Fabolous, while a second official remix features Cassidy.

== Writing and recording ==
Mario teamed up with Mikkel Storleer Eriksen and Tor Erik Hermansen from Norwegian production duo Stargate to work on his third studio album Go (2007). Along with co-writer Ne-Yo, Eriksen and Hermansen produced two songs for Go, none of which made the final track listing. The eventually finished two more songs, including "How Do I Breathe," co-written by Mario. The singer commented on the track: "The truth is that I felt like the track already had a story to tell; but that there had to be a certain flow over the record. I had to show some vulnerability, and that is what the record is about. It’s about being vulnerable and knowing that you lost something that so essential to your life. I’d say it’s about 75% true to life, and the rest is just creative writing."

== Critical reception ==
"How Do I Breathe" earned largely positive reviews. Gail Mitchell, writing for Billboard found that the song espouses the timeless feel of "Let Me Love You," while Mark Edward Nero of About.com noted that "the track isn't particularly groundbreaking, but it has a simple charm, in a sort of Ne-Yo meets Toni Braxton kind of way." AllMusic editor Andy Kellman ranked the song among his highlights on parent album Go. In a retropstive review, Aaron Fields of KSTW.com stated: "First single off the album, yet didn't have the success like "Let Me Love You" did. I remember thinking he was definitely back when I heard this song. I'm not sure why this song didn't get more attention as it is one of the better songs done by him, nevertheless I probably would have picked this for the first single as well. I still bump this one in the car."

== Commercial performance ==
"How Do I Breathe" was released on May 15, 2007. It debuted on the US Billboard Hot 100 at number 91 in the week of July 7, 2007 and eventually peaked two weeks later, reaching number 46. This marked the lowest peak for any lead single from Mario's studio albums by then. The song also reached at number 18 on Billboard's Hot R&B/Hip-Hop Songs chart, becoming Mario's fourth top 20 hit on the chart. In the United Kingdom, the song debuted on the UK Singles Chart at number 30 on download sales alone, the day before the physical release of the song. It eventually peaked at number 21 on the chart. "How Do I Breathe" also reached number four on the UK R&B chart. On November November 4, 2022, it was certified Silver by the British Phonographic Industry (BPI) for sales and streaming figures in excess of 200,000 units..

== Music video ==
The video was directed by Melina Matsoukas. Set in Los Angeles, it features actor Xavier Lamar Truesdell in a guest appearance. The visuals premiered on BET's Access Granted on May 23, 2007. After its premiere, "How Do I Breathe" received heavy airplay on BET's music video countdown show 106 & Park. It also appeared at number 87 on BET's Notarized: Top 100 Videos of 2007 countdown.

== Track listing ==
Digital / CD single
No.	Title	Producer(s)	Length
1.	"How Do I Breathe" (radio edit)	Stargate	3:37
2.	"How Do I Breathe" (instrumental)	Stargate	3:37
3.	"How Do I Breathe" (callout hook)	Stargate	0:20

Digital / CD maxi single
No.	Title	Producer(s)	Length
1.	"How Do I Breathe" (album version)	Stargate	3:37
2.	"How Do I Breathe" (Full Phatt remix, featuring Rhymefest)	Stargate; Matt Ward^{[a]}; Dean Gillar^{[a]}	4:31
3.	"How Do I Breathe" (Allister Whitehead remix featuring Cassidy)	Stargate; Allister Whitehead^{[a]}; Marcus Byrne^{[a]}	4:15

Notes

- ^{^[a]} signifies a co-producer

== Credits and personnel ==
Credits lifted from the liner notes of Go.

- Mario Barrett – vocals, writer
- Mikkel Storleer Eriksen – instruments, producer, recording engineer, writer
- Tor Erik Hermansen – instruments, producer, writer
- Phil "Taj" Jackson – writer
- Manny Marroquin – mixing engineer

== Charts ==
=== Weekly charts ===
Weekly chart performance for "How Do I Breathe"
Chart (2007)	Peak position
Australia (ARIA)	33
Australian Urban (ARIA)	7
Germany (GfK)	49
Ireland (IRMA)	45
Netherlands (Dutch Top 40 Tipparade)	12
New Zealand (Recorded Music NZ)	17
Scotland Singles (Official Charts)	27
Switzerland (Schweizer Hitparade)	61
UK Singles (Official Charts)	21
UK Hip Hop/R&B (Official Charts)	4
US Billboard Hot 100	46
US Hot R&B/Hip-Hop Songs (Billboard)	18
US Rhythmic Airplay (Billboard)	30
US Pop 100 (Billboard)	61

=== Year-end charts ===
Year-end chart performance for "How Do I Breathe"
Chart (2007)	Position
US Hot R&B/Hip-Hop Songs (Billboard)	63

== Certifications ==
Certifications for "How Do I Breathe"
Region	Certification	Certified units/sales
New Zealand (RMNZ) Remix featuring Fabolous	Platinum	30,000^{‡}
United Kingdom (BPI)	Silver	200,000^{‡}
^{‡} Sales+streaming figures based on certification alone.
