= Go (Mario album) =

Studio album by Mario
- Released: December 10, 2007
- Genre: R&B
- Length: 53:30
- Labels: 3rd Street; J
- Producers: Akon; Jasper Cameron; Oak Felder; Mr. Collipark; The Neptunes; Polow da Don; Big Reese; Ralph B. Stacy; Stargate; Stee; T-Wayne; Terry "Madd Scientist" Thomas; Timbaland

Mario chronology
Turning Point (2004)	Go (2007)	D.N.A. (2009)

Singles from Go
- 1. "How Do I Breathe" Released: May 15, 2007; 2. "Crying Out for Me" Released: August 21, 2007; 3. "Music for Love" Released: April 3, 2008

Go is the third studio album by American recording artist Mario. It was released by J Records on December 10, 2007. Mario worked with many producers on the album, most notably Scott Storch and Pharrell with whom he recorded a song called, "Faith". Other songs were written and produced by Akon, Timbaland, The Neptunes, Stargate, Mr. Collipark, Polow da Don and with guests such as Juelz Santana and Rich Boy. Go is Mario's first album to receive a parental advisory sticker in the United States, and his second to receive a parental advisory sticker in the UK.

== Release and promotion ==
The album was originally scheduled to be released on November 28, 2006 under the title "Mario Barrett – Effortless. It was to be his first album in which Mario would use his full name. The album then had several release dates in 2007, including April 4, May 8, July 31, August 21, October 9, and finally November 27 – coincidentally, exactly a year after the first date announced. The album was eventually released on December 10, 2007 in the United Kingdom and December 11, 2007 in the United States. When asked about the delays of the album, Mario answered that he had "a few legal situations to work through, which set his album back 6 to 8 months", adding that, he now has "more control over his projects and albums he gets done."

In 2007 Mario toured with Dijon Thomas, the tour was called Do Right Tour. In 2008, Mario was scheduled as the tour's opening act for all dates of Ms. Kelly Tour with Kelly Rowland, to promote his album Go. On July 2, 2008, Courtney Galliano & Joshua Allen from the U.S. television reality program and dance competition So You Think You Can Dance, danced to "Skippin" as the part of the competition.

== Singles ==
The album was preceded by "How Do I Breathe," Go's first single, released on May 15, 2007. While the song was not as commercially successful as previous releases, it reaching number 46 on the US Billboard Hot 100 and number 18 on the Billboard Hot R&B/Hip-Hop Songs chart. It was more successful elsewhere, reaching number 17 in New Zealand and number 21 in the United Kingdom, where it was eventually certified silver by the British Phonographic Industry (BPI) in November 2022 for sales in excess of 200,000 units. A music video for "How Do I Breathe" premiered exclusively on May 23, 2007 on BET.

For his second single from Go, on Mario's official website, fans were asked to vote for the next single from the choices, "Why", "Kryptonite", or "Crying Out for Me". The second single officially released was "Crying Out for Me", with the music video premiering on September 17, 2007 on BET, again. Released August 21, 2007, it was more successful in the US, peaking at number 5 on the Billboard Hot R&B/Hip-Hop Songs and number 33 on the Billboard Hot 100. On July 30, 2008, "Crying Out for Me" received a gold certification from Recording Industry Association of America (RIAA).

While Mario did shoot a video for the song "Do Right," using clips from a MTV documentary surrounding his mother's substance abuse, it served as a promotional single only and did not chart due to having an unofficial release. Instead, "Music for Love," released on April 3, 2008, served as the album final single from the album. The song failed to chart on the Billboard Hot 100 but reached the top 20 on the Hot R&B/Hip-Hop Songs chart, peaking at number 18.

== Critical response ==
Professional ratings
Review scores
Source	Rating
About.com	3/5 stars
AllMusic	4/5 stars
DJBooth	4/5 stars
KSTW	4/5 stars

Go received favorable reviews from critics. Andy Kellman of Allmusic gave the album four out of five stars, characterized the album as "the singer's strongest release yet, easily apparent after one listen, a credit that can be distributed equally between an ever-improving artist and his collaborators". He also said "Go is indeed Mario's most aggressive and assertive album, but no other song comes close to out-vulgarizing "Go" itself." Sophie Bruce of BBC Music characterizeD the album as "A good mix of romantic ballads and up-tempo floorfillers." She found that "the production values are slicker and the beats snappier than on his two previous albums [...] While his contemporaries churn out identikit baby-voiced falsetto tunes, Mario’s distinctive voice is earthier and more mature with the underlying power of a young Luther Vandross."

Nathan Slavik from DjBooth.net called Go "an honest, confident and purposeful collection that sounds like the work of someone who’s put aside childhood concerns and fully embraced what it means to be a man." He found that while a few songs "fall short of perfect, but if they sound lacking it’s only because Mario’s has raised the bar so high on the rest of the album. R&B has no shortage of boys; right now it desperately needs more men, and Go is Mario’s musical ticket into the world of the grown and sexy." Mark Edward Nero from About.com gave the album three out of five stars and said that "Go is the first Mario album that carries a parental advisory sticker, and for very good reason." He stated too "Mario has bitten a big chunk out of Usher's vocal style, plus added some R. Kelly-style raunch to his lyrics, seemingly to shake things up and throw some dirt on his previously squeaky clean image. But Mario's occasional bawdiness here is crude, distasteful and completely unnecessary."

== Chart performance ==
Go debuted and peaked at number 21 on the US Billboard 200, selling 77,000 copies in its first week. It marked Mario's lowest opening sales for any of his studio projects up to then and was a considerable decline from his previous effort Turning Point, which had opened to sales of 161,000 units in 2004. The album also reached number four on the Top R&B/Hip-Hop Albums, becoming his third consecutive top five entry on the chart.

== Track listing ==
Go track listing
No.	Title	Writer(s)	Producer(s)	Length
1.	"Go"	Pharrell Williams	The Neptunes	3:47
2.	"Crying Out for Me"	Jamal Jones; Jasper Cameron	Polow da Don; Jasper^{[b]}	4:48
3.	"Skippin'"	Terry Thomas; Theron Thomas	Theron "MaddScientist" Thomas	3:58
4.	"Music for Love"	Jerrod Stacy; Thomas; Thomas	Ralph B. Stacy; Jevon Hill^{[c]}	3:49
5.	"Kryptonite" (featuring Rich Boy)	Mario Barrett; Warren Felder; Clifford Harris; Atozzio Towns	Oak	4:12
6.	"How Do I Breathe"	Mikkel Storleer Eriksen; Tor Erik Hermansen; Phil "Taj" Jackson	Stargate	3:36
7.	"No Definition"	Tim Mosley; Ezekiel Lewis; Balewa Muhammad; Jerome Harmon; Patrick Smith; Candice Nelson; King Logan	Timbaland; J-Roc^{[a]}; Logan^{[a]}	3:49
8.	"Why"	Barrett; Marsha Ambrosius; Felder	Oak	3:42
9.	"Lay in My Bed"	Cameron; Maurice Sinclair; Jones	Big Reese; Jasper	3:35
10.	"Right and a Wrong Way"	Teddy Riley; Keith Sweat	Stee; T-Wayne	5:11
11.	"Let Me Watch" (featuring Juelz Santana)	Michael Crooms; Sean Garrett; LaRon James	Mr. Collipark; Garrett^{[a]}	4:24
12.	"Do Right"	Barrett; Aliaune Thiam; Giorgio Tuinfort; Harold Lilly	Akon	4:02
Total length:				53:30

United Kingdom/Japan Bonus track
No.	Title	Writer(s)	Producer(s)	Length
13.	"Let Me Love You" (Acoustic)	Scott Storch; Ne-Yo; Mario	Storch	4:35

United States/iTunes bonus track
No.	Title	Writer(s)	Producer(s)	Length
14.	"What Is It Gonna Be"	Theron "Neff-U" Feemster; Shaffer Smith	Feemster; Ne-Yo	3:25

in some countries replaces "Music for Love"
No.	Title	Writer(s)	Producer(s)	Length
15.	"Ghetto Love "	Sterling Simms; Kristal Oliver; Chasity Nwagbara; Chuka Maduakor; Felder	Oak	4:09

Notes

- ^{^[a]} signifies a co-producer
- ^{^[b]} signifies a vocal producer
- ^{^[c]} signifies an additional vocal producer

== Personal and credits ==
- Vocals: Mario
- Choir, chorus: Stacie Davis, Esther Dean, Shari M. Gary, Kim McCoy, English Norman, Dawn Toran, Sam Salter, Crystal Johnson, Larel Frederick, Nastacia "Nazz" Kendall & Alan Austin
- Engineers: Andrew Mezzi, Princeton, Carlton Lynn, Vernon Mungo, Ralph Cacciurri, Darren Moore, Andrew Coleman, Dave Hyman, Geoffrey Rice, Kori Anders, Corey Stocker, Mikkel S. Eriksen & Tony Terrebonne
- Instrumentation: Stee, Tor Erik Hermanson & Mikkel S. Eriksen (aka Stargate)
- Guitar: Mike Hartnett & Tony Love
- Keyboards: Elvis Williams
- Keyboards, programming: Giorgio Tuinfort
- Executive producer: Peter Edge, J.Erving, Mario & Rick Frazier John lopez
- Mastered: David Kutch
- Creative direction/Design: Jane Marledge
- Photography: Patrick Holeck
- Assistant: Lloyd Copper, Jared Robbins & Mike Miller
- Vocal producers: Jevon Hill, Nelly & Avery Storm
- Mixing: Manny Marroquin, Phil Tan & Jean-Marie Horvat
- Digital editing: Colin Miller
- Featuring vocals: Juelz Santana & Rich Boy

== Locations and studios ==
Recording locations and studios included:

- Battery Studios, New York, New York
- Dirty South Studios, Atlanta, Georgia
- Doppler Studios, Atlanta, Georgia
- MTS Recording
- Patchwerk Records Studios, Atlanta, Georgia
- Silent Sound Studios, Atlanta, Georgia
- Sony Music Studios, New York, New York
- South Beach Studios, Miami, Florida
- St. Louis, Missouri
- Thomas Crown Headquarters, Virginia Beach, Virginia
- Transcon Studios, Orlando, Florida
- Zac Digital, Atlanta, Georgia

== Charts ==
=== Weekly charts ===
Weekly chart performance for Go
Chart (2007–08)	Peak position
Japanese Albums (Oricon)	43
US Billboard 200	21
US Top R&B/Hip-Hop Albums (Billboard)	4

=== Year-end charts ===
Year-end chart performance for Go
Chart (2008)	Position
US Billboard 200	137
US Top R&B/Hip-Hop Albums (Billboard)	26

== Certifications ==
Region	Certification	Certified units/sales
New Zealand (RMNZ)	Gold	7,500^{‡}
^{‡} Sales+streaming figures based on certification alone.

== Release history ==
Release dates for Go
Region	Date	Format	Label	Ref(s)
South Africa	October 9, 2007	CD; digital download	J Records	
Germany	December 4, 2007	CD; digital download	J Records	
Australia	December 8, 2007	CD; digital download	J Records	
United States	December 11, 2007	CD; digital download	J Records	
Japan	December 11, 2007	CD; digital download	J Records	
United Kingdom	December 10, 2007	CD; digital download	J Records	
