= Crying Out for Me =

Single by Mario

from the album Go
- Released: October 31, 2007
- Genre: R&B
- Length: 4:48
- Label: 3rd Street; J
- Songwriters: Jasper Cameron; Jamal Jones
- Producer: Polow da Don

Mario singles chronology
"How Do I Breathe" (2007)	"Crying Out for Me" (2007)	"Music for Love" (2008)

"Crying Out for Me" is an R&B song by American singer Mario, released by J Records on October 31, 2007 as the second single from his third studio album, Go (2007). It was written by Jasper Cameron and Polow da Don, while the latter handled the song's production.

"Crying Out for Me" peaked at number 33 on the US Billboard Hot 100, becoming the album's highest-charting single in the United States.

== Background ==
"Crying Out for Me" was written by Jasper Cameron and Polow da Don for Mario's third studio album Go (2007). Production on the track was overseen by the latter, while Cameron also served as a vocal producer. Mario elaborated on "Crying Out for Me" in an interview with hhnlive.com in 2007: "This record is special because when Polow was making the track, it's a very musical, layered track. There's sounds that come in towards the end of the song that's not really in the top of the song, so it just helps to tell the story. The record talks about how you could be with somebody or know somebody for so long that it gets to a certain point in the relationship where y'all start feeling for each other. I talk about how I can hear her heart crying out for me."

== Critical reception ==
Drum described "Crying Out for Me" as "a beautifully produced track that showcases [Mario's] voice," while Mark Edward Nero from About.com called the song an "Usher sound-alike jam." Aaron Fields from KSTW.com wrote: "I really like this track produced by Polow da Don. It's a smooth track about the classic subject [...] woman is being done wrong in her current relationship in which Mario sings to her, "I can hear your heart, crying out for me." Great vocals, great beat and definitely a great choice for the second single." AllMusic editor Andy Kellman ranked the song among his highlights on parent album Go.

== Commercial performance ==
"Crying Out for Me" became the album's highest-charting single in the United States. It spent 15 weeks on the Billboard Hot 100, peaking at number 33, where it stayed for one week. Elsewhere, it reached the top five on Billboard's Hot R&B/Hip-Hop Songs, becoming Mario's highest-charting single since "Let Me Love You" (2005). The magazine ranked the song 12th on its 2008 Hot R&B/Hip-Hop Song year-end chart. On July 30, 2008, "Crying Out for Me" was certified Gold by the Recording Industry Association of America (RIAA).

== Music video ==
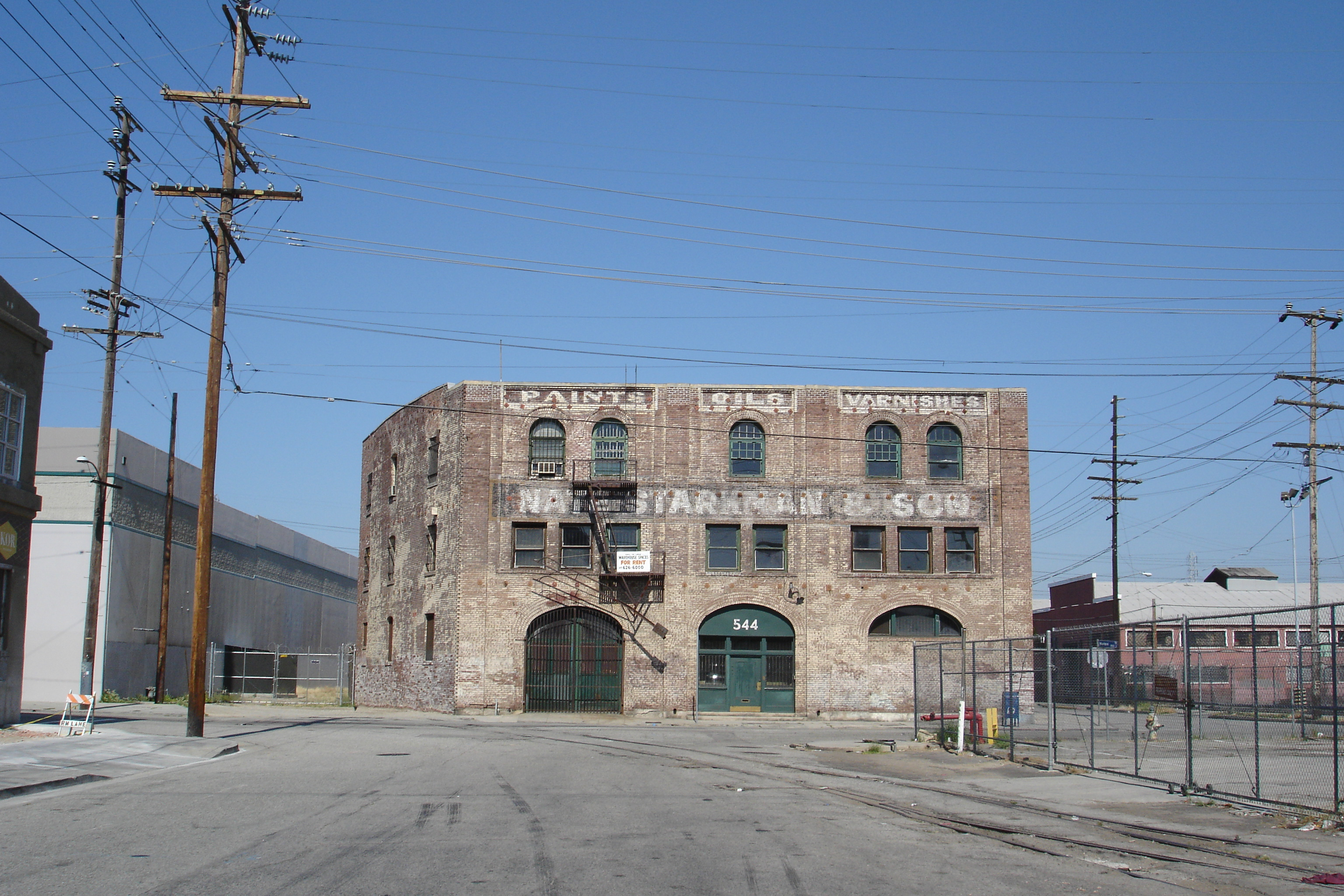
"Crying Out for Me" was filmed in various locations, including the Starkman Building in Downtown Los Angeles.

A music video for "Crying Out for Me was directed by R. Malcom Jones and filmed in Los Angeles. Costume designed by June Ambrose, it premiered on BET's Access Granted on September 17, 2007. In the video, the song has some alternate changes. In the beginning, Mario arrives at some place in his Porsche 911 Turbo. He sees his female friend having an argument with her boyfriend. When her boyfriend walks off, Mario walks over to greet her. Her boyfriend jealously snatches her away from him and gets in his face. The girl, bruised, calls Mario from a payphone. They then go to a club. He picks her up later and she looking over her shoulder, leaves. After they embrace, Mario drives off. They get a surprise when they notice that they are being followed by the girl's boyfriend. He tries to run them off the road but ends up crashing, killing himself. They get out to investigate and see that he is dead. The girl tearfully turns to Mario and he comforts her.

== Remix ==
The official remix of "Crying Out for Me" features rapper Lil Wayne, while another one features rapper Busta Rhymes. None of the remixed were included on the physical single of "Crying Out for Me" or parent album Go. In 2019, Canadian singer Tory Lanez sampled "Crying Out for Me" in his song "The Cry" from his fourth studio album Chixtape 5. Mario appears as a guest vocalist on the song.

== Track listing ==
Digital single
No.	Title	Length
1.	"Crying Out for Me" (radio edit)	3:21
2.	"Crying Out for Me" (instrumental version)	3:21
3.	"Crying Out for Me" (callout hook)	0:16

== Credits and personnel ==
Credits lifted from the liner notes of Go.

- Mario Barrett – vocals
- Jasper Cameron – vocal producer, writer
- J. Erving – management
- Mike Hartnett – guitar
- Polow da Don – producer, writer
- Corey Stocker – recording engineer
- Phil Tan – mixing engineer
- Tony Terrebonne – recording engineer
- Elvis Williams – keyboards

== Charts ==
=== Weekly charts ===
Weekly chart performance for "Crying Out for Me"
Chart (2007–2008)	Peak position
US Billboard Hot 100	33
US Hot R&B/Hip-Hop Songs (Billboard)	5
US Rhythmic Airplay (Billboard)	12

=== Year-end charts ===
Year-end chart performance for "Crying Out for Me"
Chart (2008)	Position
US Hot R&B/Hip-Hop Songs (Billboard)	12

== Certifications ==
Certifications for "Crying Out for Me"
Region	Certification	Certified units/sales
United States (RIAA)	Gold	500,000^{^}
^{^} Shipments figures based on certification alone.

== Release history ==
Release dates and formats for "Crying Out for Me"
Region	Date	Format	Label(s)	Ref.
United States	March 3, 2008	Mainstream airplay	J	
