= Do Right (Mario song) =

Promotional single by Mario

from the album Go
- Released: December 11, 2007
- Recorded: 2007
- Genre: R&B
- Length: 4:02
- Label: J; Epic
- Songwriters: Akon; Harold Lilly; Giorgio Tuinfort; Mario
- Producer: Akon

"Do Right" is an R&B song from Mario's third studio album Go. It was released on December 11, 2007 as a promotional single. It was produced by Akon and written by Akon, LSG, Harold Lilly, Giorgio Tuinfort and Mario. This song is dedicated to his mother. The song did not peak any chart because it was to promote the show about his mother but the radios instantly turned the song into a hit. Mario also created a "Do Right" foundation.

== Critical reception ==
Aaron Fields from KSTW.com states "I absolutely love this song. I have played this song so many times its ridiculous. It's a strong and powerful song. It really shows another side to Mario and the struggles in his life. I remember hearing a clip of this song when he had a special on TV about helping his mom getting clean from drugs. Very well written song. The lyrics, beat, melody and singing are perfect on this song. This is what you get when everything in a song agrees with one another, a perfect and powerful song".

== Music video ==
The video was directed by Mario himself and premiered on Yahoo! Music. The black and white clip shows Mario writing a letter to his mother and finding it hard for the first time. This track is allegedly a hint to Mario's personal life where his real-life mother is said to be a heroin addict. In the song he sang, "That's why I'm here to help you fight to do right". The video has scenes that are in the special documentary of the MTV.
