= Braid My Hair =

Single by Mario

from the album Mario
- Released: October 15, 2002
- Genre: R&B
- Length: 4:06
- Label: 3rd Street; J
- Songwriters: Warryn Campbell; Harold Lilly
- Producer: Warryn Campbell

Mario singles chronology
"Just a Friend 2002" (2002)	"Braid My Hair" (2002)	"C'mon" (2003)

Music video
- "Braid My Hair" on YouTube

"Braid My Hair" is a song by American singer Mario. It was written by Warryn Campbell and Harold Lilly and produced by the former for Mario's self-titled debut album (2002), while Lilly is also credited as a vocal producer on the track. A downtempo contemporary R&B song about young love and the intimacy of getting your hair braided, it was conceived late into the production of Mario. Released by J Records in October 2002 as the album's second single, the song reached the top 20 on the US Hot R&B/Hip-Hop Songs chart.

== Background ==
"Braid My Hair" was written by Warryn "Baby Dubb" Campbell and Harold Lilly. Recorded late into the studio sessions for Mario's self-titled debut album (2002), the song was conceived in New York after Mario had come into the studio with his hair half-way braided and half-way out, feeling unmotivated and just wanting to let his girlfriend braid his hair. It was not until when Lilly was playing the instrumental track for what would become "Braid My Hair," that he suggested to write a song about it. Mario elaborated on the creation process: "He was like, "That's the song right there! We need to write a song about you just being a young kid, just wanting to do something simple, like going home and getting your hair braided, but we're gonna make it super melodic." So I went into the booth and started singing melodies to the ideas he was having. Then Harold, who was more experienced with writing, just wrote the lyrics.

== Critical reception ==
Billboard remarked that the "age-appropriate "Braid My Hair" proves that the singer can also slow things down; at the same time, the love song is a fine showcase for his youthful tenor." Mya Singleton from Yardbarker noted that with the song, the "singer expresses that while he lives the life of a musician, sometimes he just wants to go home to relieve some stress. Part of the relief process is getting his hair braided; in that moment, he feels more comfortable and at ease." In his review of parent album Mario, Dan LeRoy from AllMusic felt that "Braid My Hair" manages "to evoke the downside of being a child star without sounding like an ungrateful punk."

== Music video ==
A music video for "Braid My Hair" was directed by Bryan Barber. As with the visuals for "Just a Friend 2002," the video was initially planned to be filmed in Mario's hometown of Baltimore, Maryland, but since the singer was forced to stay in Los Angeles to record some more tracks for his debut album, Mario and Barber ended up shooting it at a local museum. Commenting on the video, Mario told BuzzFeed in 2018: "I told the Brian Barber that I wanted it to be like real life, showing me returning "home" to visit family, me being on the road, and even performing at a show. I just wanted it to be super raw, super real. So we just created that concept. It was cool and family-oriented. It was showing you the boy-next-door."

== Track listing ==
CD single
No.	Title	Length
1.	"Braid My Hair" (radio edit)	3:58
2.	"Braid My Hair" (instrumental)	3:58
3.	"Braid My Hair" (call out hook)	3:23

== Credits and personnel ==
Credits lifted from the liner notes of Mario.

- Mario Barrett – vocals
- Warryn Campbell – producer, vocal producer, writer
- Thor Laewe – recording engineer
- Harold Lilly – vocal producer, writer
- Manny Marroquin – mixing engineer

== Charts ==
Weekly chart performance for "C'Mon"
Chart (2002)	Peak position
US Billboard Hot 100	74
US Hot R&B/Hip-Hop Songs (Billboard)	18
