= The Walls (song) =

Single by Mario featuring Fabolous
- Released: September 23, 2011
- Recorded: July 2011
- Length: 3:09
- Label: RCA; 3rd Street
- Songwriters: Mario Barrett; John Jackson; Pierre Medor; Richard Butler Jr.
- Producers: Rico Love; Pierre Medor

Mario singles chronology
"My Bed" (2011)	"The Walls" (2011)	"Somebody Else" (2013)

"The Walls" is a song by American R&B singer Mario, featuring guest vocals from American rapper Fabolous. It was written by both performers along with Pierre Medor and Rico Love, both of whom also produced the song. "The Walls" was released by RCA Records on September 23, 2011 as a digital single, intended to serve as the lead single for Restoration, Mario's fifth studio album with RCA that was ultimately scrapped. It reached number 58 on the US Hot R&B/Hip-Hop Songs chart.

== Background ==
"The Walls" was written by Mario, featured vocalist Fabolous and its producers, Pierre Medor and Rico Love, for what was to planned to be released as Mario's fifth studio album under RCA Records, following his 2009 album D.N.A.. In an interview with Rap-Up, Mario commented on the song: "It’s an incredible R&B record. It’s classic, it’s definitely going to stand out from everything that’s going on. It really pays homage to women who are comfortable with being sexy outside and they’re sexy with their men when they get home." Love further elaborated: "It’s just some classic R&B, just some fly music. Something to reemerge Mario in the scene. I’m very confident with the record. I believe it’s going to be a big record."

== Release and reception ==
Intended to serve as the lead single for Mario's fifth studio album Restoration, "The Walls" was released digitally by RCA Records on September 23, 2011. It debuted on the US Hot R&B/Hip-Hop Songs chart on the week of October 10, 2011 and eventually peaked at number 58 on December 3, 2011. Following its underperformance, the song was later demoted and replaced as a lead single in favor of new material, with planned parent album Restoration eventually being scrapped.

== Track listing ==
Digital single
No.	Title	Writer(s)	Producer(s)	Length
1.	"The Walls" (featuring Fabolous)	Mario Barrett; John Jackson; Pierre Medor; Richard Butler Jr.	Rico Love; Pierre Medor	3:09

== Credits and personnel ==
Credits lifted from the liner notes of "The Walls."

- Diego Avendano – assistant engineer
- Mario Barrett – vocals, writer
- Fabolous – vocals, writer
- Matt Huber – assistant engineer
- Rico Love – producer, writer
- Robert Marks – mixing engineer
- Sean McCoy – assistant engineer
- Thurston McCrea – recording engineer
- Pierre Medor – producer, writer

== Charts ==
Weekly chart performance for "The Walls"
Chart (2011)	Peak position
US Hot R&B/Hip-Hop Songs (Billboard)	58

== Release history ==
Release dates for "The Walls"
Region	Date	Format(s)	Label(s)	Ref.
United States	September 23, 2011	Digital download	RCA	
