= Gérald Isaac =

Canadian actor and tenor

Gérald Isaac (1955 - September 2023) was a Canadian actor and tenor known for his performances in both operas and musicals. He has performed leading roles with the Canadian Opera Company, the Houston Grand Opera, the Lyric Opera of Chicago, the New York City Opera, Opera Atelier, and the San Francisco Opera. He has performed in musicals at the National Arts Centre, the Princess of Wales Theatre, and the Stratford Festival.

Isaac runs a musical theatre and performance studio in Toronto.
