= Music for Love =

Single by Mario

from the album Go
- Released: April 3, 2008
- Genre: R&B
- Label: 3rd Street; J; Epic
- Songwriters: Jerrod Stacy; Theron Thomas; Timothy Thomas
- Producer: Ralph B. Stacy

Mario singles chronology
"Crying Out for Me" (2007)	"Music for Love" (2008)	"That's How I Go" (2009)

Audio video
- "Music for Love" on YouTube

"Music for Love" is a song by American singer Mario. It was written by Ralph B. "Jerrod" Stacy along with Theron Thomas and Timothy Thomas from American hip hop duo R. City and was recorded for his third studio album Go (2007), while production was overseen by the former. The song was released by 3rd Street Music Group and J Records as the album's third and final single on December 11, 2007 and became a top 20 hit on the US Hot R&B/Hip-Hop Songs chart.

== Critical reception ==
Andy Kellman from AllMusic found that "Music for Love" was among the "sensitive ballads" on parent album Go and noted that it bears "a definite resemblance to J. Holiday's gently rocking and swaying "Bed"." Aaron Fields from KSTW.com wrote: "This is one of the standout beats on this album. Talk about bumpin' this is the one to bump right here. A nice mid-tempo track with much bass. You'll want to put this one on repeat. His voice sounds great on this track and the arrangement is on point once again".

== Commercial performance ==
"Music for Love" first appeared on the US Billboard Hot R&B/Hip-Hop Songs chart in the week of April 3, 2008, debuting at number 100. It eventually peaked at number 18 in the week of September 27, 2008. The magazine ranked the song 50th on its 2008 Hot R&B/Hip-Hop Song year-end chart.

== Credits and personnel ==
Credits lifted from the liner notes of Go.

- Kori Anders – recording engineer
- Mario Barrett – vocals
- Ralph Cacciuri – recording engineer
- Lloyd Copper – recording assistance
- Jevon Hill – vocal producer
- Manny Marroquin – mixing engineer
- Mike Miller – recording assistance
- Jared Robbins – mixing assistance
- Ralph "Jerrod" Stacy – producer, writer
- Theron Thomas – writer
- Timothy Thomas – writer

== Charts ==
=== Weekly charts ===
Weekly chart performance for "Music for Love"
Chart (2008)	Peak position
US Bubbling Under Hot 100 (Billboard)	9
US Hot R&B/Hip-Hop Songs (Billboard)	18
US Radio Songs (Billboard)	59

=== Year-end charts ===
Year-end chart performance for "Music for Love"
Chart (2008)	Position
US Hot R&B/Hip-Hop Songs (Billboard)	50
