= Dancing Shadows =

Studio album by Mario
- Released: October 5, 2018
- Recorded: 2016–2017
- Studio: Amerycan Studios in Los Angeles; FRQNCY Studios in London; Sticky Studios in Surrey
- Length: 37:38
- Label: New Citizen; Empire
- Producer: Jake Gosling; Mario; Daecolm; J Warner; P2J; Pham; Ryan McDermott; xSDTRK

Mario chronology
D.N.A. (2009)	Dancing Shadows (2018)	Closer to Mars (2020)

Singles from Dancing Shadows
- 1. "Drowning" Released: July 20, 2018; 2. "Dancing Shadows" Released: September 14, 2018; 3. "Care for You" Released: March 15, 2019

Dancing Shadows is the fifth studio album from American singer and songwriter Mario, released on October 5, 2018. The release of the album marks the first under the singer's own imprint New Citizen Music, in partnership with EMPIRE Distribution. Dancing Shadows is the first project by the singer that features his own songwriting on every track.

The album serves as a follow-up to his fourth album D.N.A. (2009) and his first studio effort in almost a decade. It was executive produced by Mario and English producer Jake Gosling, with additional producers xSDTRK, Daecolm, Pham, J Warner, P2J and Ryan McDermott.

The album's lead single, "Drowning" was released on July 20, 2018, along with the accompanying music video, while the second single, "Dancing Shadows" was released on September 14, 2018, and also includes an accompanying music video.

The album failed to chart on the US Billboard 200. To further promote the album, Mario appeared as an opening act for B2K on The Millennium Tour.

== Background and development ==
In August 2011, RCA Music Group announced it was disbanding J Records along with Arista Records and Jive Records. With the shutdown, Mario, and all other artists previously signed to these three labels, will release his future albums on the RCA Records label.

During his appearance on BET's 106 & Park on July 10, 2013, to premiere, the video for "Somebody Else", Mario stated that he felt the album recorded with Rico Love did not feel part of his career plan and that he scrapped that album and went on to record his then-titled album Evolve, which was set to be released on September 17, 2013. The album was not released, and Mario left RCA Records in 2015.

In mid-2015, Mario announced that he has reunited with Scott Storch, who produced his 2004 hit "Let Me Love You", on a new album, titled Never 2 Late for a song called "Enemy", that ended up being finished by Chris Brown and published on his album Heartbreak on a Full Moon. Never 2 Late was scheduled to be released on November 27, 2015, but was pushed to December 4, 2015, but the album was not released.

On May 6, 2016, Mario premiered and released the single "I Need More". On December 13, 2016, he released the single "Let Me Help You". On June 16, 2017, he released the single "Pain is the New Pleasure". A remixed version of "Let Me Help You" featuring Jamaican recording artist Konshens was released on August 18, 2017.

In mid-2018, Mario spoke with the FunX radio station during the Oh My! Music Festival in June 2018, announcing that the album's final title was Dancing Shadows and would be released later in 2018 with a new single called "Drowning": "We changed the name of it. Making an album is like giving birth to something. You go through different names and different vibes."

Following the release of the second single, "Dancing Shadows", and its accompanying music video, the album's cover art, release date and tracklist were revealed.

== Singles ==
"Drowning", was released on July 20, 2018, as the album's first single and was accompanied by its music video. The song has peaked at number 30 on the US Adult R&B Songs chart and later peaked at number 28.

The title track "Dancing Shadows" was issued as the album's second single on September 14, 2018, alongside its music video.

"Care for You" was released alongside its music video on March 15, 2019, as the third single from the album. The music video was directed by Khufu Najee.

The music video for the track "Goes Like That" premiered on October 4, 2018. The remix version by GXNXVS was released on August 2, 2019.

== Critical reception ==
HotNewHipHop noted that Dancing Shadows finds himself in a convalescent mood, though at this seems obvious that at this point, Mario is more at ease in a dimmer spotlight hanging over his head." The website called the album a "surprisingly cohesive comeback attempt, very much the work of a wizened individual who writes on his vision board each morning."

== Track listing ==
Credits are adapted from the album's liner notes and Tidal.

Dancing Shadows track listing
No.	Title	Writer(s)	Producer(s)	Length
1.	"Drowning"	Mario Barrett; Daecolm Diego Holland; Jake Gosling; Milton Adams II; Yonatan Ayal	xSDTRK; Daecolm; Mario^{[b]}	3:38
2.	"Too Many Options"	Barrett; Brandon Lloyd Hesson; Dawid Pham Ngoc; Gosling; Adams II	Pham; Mario^{[b]}	3:33
3.	"Dancing Shadows"	Barrett; Ngoc; Sean Fenton; Gosling	Pham; Mario; Gosling^{[b]}	3:00
4.	"Mirror"	Barrett; Ariowa Ogheneochuko Kennedy Irosogie; Richard Isong	P2J; Mario; Gosling^{[a]}	3:21
5.	"Gold Plates"	Barrett; Daniel Adekugbe; Ngoc; Jackson Dimiglio-Wood; Gosling; Nathaniel James Warner	J Warner; Gosling^{[a]}; Pham^{[a]}; Mario^{[b]}	3:01
6.	"Good Times" (featuring Buddy Guy)	Barrett; Bianca Atterberry; Holland; George Guy; Dimiglio-Wood; Gosling; Fenton; Tshiswaka Kayembe	Daecolm; Gosling^{[a]}; Mario^{[a]}	3:11
7.	"What You Started"	Barrett; Carla Marie Williams; Dimiglio-Wood; Gosling	Gosling; Mario^{[b]}	4:23
8.	"One Man Woman"	Barrett; Felisha King; Dimiglio-Wood; Gosling	Gosling; Mario^{[b]}	3:13
9.	"Care for You"	Barrett; King; Dimiglio-Wood; Gosling	Gosling	3:32
10.	"Goes Like That"	Barrett; Guordan Banks; Dimiglio-Wood; Gosling	Gosling; Mario^{[b]}	3:26
11.	"I Believe"	Barrett; Dimiglio-Wood; Gosling; Ryan McDermott	McDermott; Gosling; Mario	3:20
Total length:				37:38

Notes

- ^{^[a]} signifies a co-producer
- ^{^[b]} signifies an additional producer
- "Good Times" originally didn't feature credited vocals by Buddy Guy.
- "One Man Woman" features background vocals from Felicia Fury.

== Charts ==
Weekly chart performance for Dancing Shadows
Chart (2018)	Peak position
US R&B/Hip-Hop Album Sales (Billboard)	41

== Release history ==
Release history for Dancing Shadows
Region	Date	Format	Label	Ref.
Various	October 5, 2018	Digital download; streaming	New Citizen; EMPIRE	
Various	November 16, 2018	CD	New Citizen; EMPIRE	
Various	January 25, 2019	Vinyl	New Citizen; EMPIRE	
