= Mario (American singer) =

American R&B singer (born 1986)

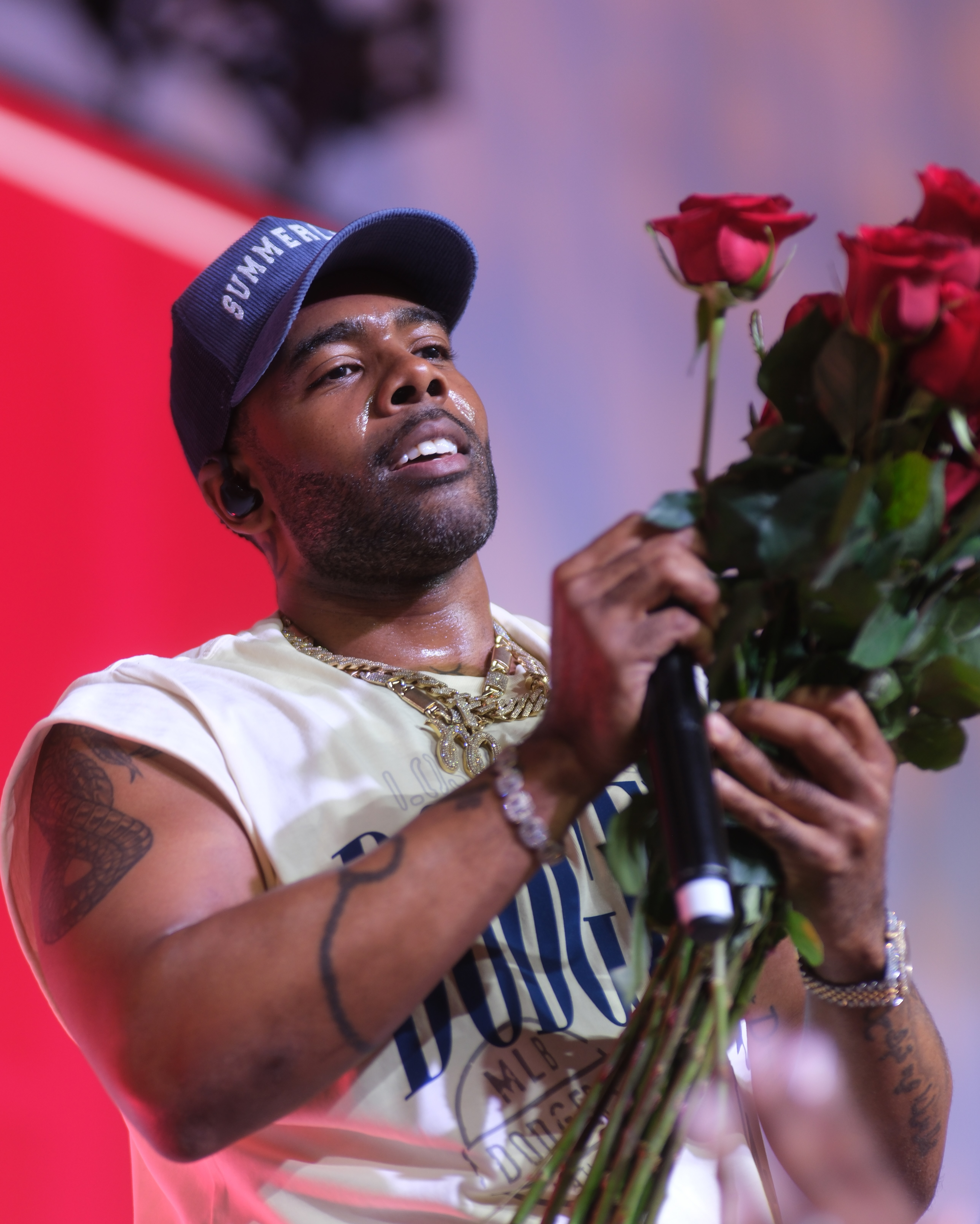
- Mario Performing at Essence Festival of Culture 2026

Background information
- Born: Mario Dewar Barrett; August 27, 1986 (age 40); Baltimore, Maryland, U.S.
- Genre: R&B
- Occupations: Singer; songwriter; dancer; actor
- Works: Mario discography
- Years active: 2001–present
- Labels: New Citizen; RCA; J; 3rd Street
- Formerly of: Knightwritaz
- Website: marioworldwide.com

Mario Dewar Barrett (born August 27, 1986), known mononymously as Mario, is an American R&B singer, songwriter and dancer. Born and raised in Baltimore, Maryland, he signed a record deal with J Records—at the age of 14—to release his self-titled debut studio album (2002). Its lead single, "Just a Friend 2002", peaked within the Billboard Hot 100's top five, while the album peaked at number nine on the Billboard 200. His second album, Turning Point (2004), was supported by the Billboard Hot 100-number one single "Let Me Love You," which was nominated for Best Male R&B Vocal Performance at the 48th Annual Grammy Awards, won two Billboard Music Awards, and yielded his furthest commercial success.

His third studio album, Go (2007), saw mild success with its singles "How Do I Breathe" and "Crying Out for Me". His fourth album, D.N.A. (2009), matched his self-titled debut on the Billboard 200, while its lead single, "Break Up" (featuring Gucci Mane and Sean Garrett), peaked within the top 20 of the Billboard Hot 100 and received platinum certification by the Recording Industry Association of America (RIAA). In the following year, Barrett was ranked No. 98 by Billboard on their "Artist of the Decade" list. His fifth album, Dancing Shadows (2018), served as his first independent release.

Aside from his musical career, he appeared in several television shows and films such as Step Up (2006) of the Step Up franchise, Freedom Writers (2007), season 6 of Dancing with the Stars and Empire (2018–2020). In 2019, Mario starred in the live television production of the Primetime Emmy nominated musical Rent. In 2024, he was runner-up on season 12 of The Masked Singer.

== Early life and education ==
Mario Dewar Barrett was born on August 27, 1986, in Baltimore, Maryland, to his mother Shawntia Hardaway and father Derryl Barrett Sr., a singer in a gospel group called Reformation. He also has a half-brother Derryl "D.J." Barrett Jr., who is a professional drummer. He grew up in west Baltimore and other working-class neighborhoods in Baltimore County, Maryland. He lived with his grandmother, who raised him while his single mother struggled with drug addiction. At the age of four, Mario proclaimed that he wanted to become a singer. In support of his dream, his mother bought him a karaoke machine. Mario joined a musical group in Milford Mill Academy with the oldest son of comedian Mo'Nique and best friend Jaye Brebnor and also his younger god sister Chea Tyler. Barrett learned to play the piano and used that skill as the basis for his melodies and songs. He was discovered at age eleven and signed by producer Troy Patterson, after singing "I'll Make Love to You" at a Coppin State College talent show. Mario attended Milford Mill Academy up until the tenth grade where he was inspired by his music teacher, during his early teen years, and was offered a record deal at the age of fourteen, signing with Clive Davis' J Records. His musical influences include Stevie Wonder, Marvin Gaye, Sam Cooke, Nat King Cole, Brian McKnight, Boyz II Men, Michael Jackson, Usher, and Joe. His first introduction to the music industry was the Dr. Dolittle 2 movie soundtrack in 2001. He sang a cover of the Stevie Wonder song "You and I" at Clive's Grammy party in 2002, and began recording an album.

== Music career ==
=== 2001–2003: Mario ===
In July 2001, Mario began recording his major-label debut album, titled Mario, which was nearly a year before the official release in March 2002. The album's lead single "Just a Friend 2002", which was a cover of Biz Markie's song, was a success, peaking at number four on the Billboard Hot 100. Follow-up singles were "Braid My Hair" and "C'mon". He was the opening act on the Scream Tour 3, which featured headliners such as B2K, Marques Houston, Nick Cannon, Jhené Aiko and AJA. As of 2006, his debut album has sold over 700,000 copies. During this period, he became a draw in the teen market.

=== 2004–2006: Turning Point ===
After his debut album was released, Mario wanted to record an album that was more mature. He enlisted a number of well-known producers to help him, such as Scott Storch and Lil' Jon. He released his second album, Turning Point on December 7, 2004. The album was more successful than his first, mainly because of the hit single "Let Me Love You". The single, described by reviewers as "melodic and sweetly lilting, reminiscent of Michael Jackson's vintage romantic ballads" was successful, peaking at number one on the Billboard Hot 100 for nine consecutive weeks. The single was written by Ne-Yo. Other follow-up singles include "How Could You" co-written by J. Valentine, with a cameo appearance in the video by rapper Cassidy; "Here I Go Again" (whose video starred model/singer Cassie) and "Boom" featuring Juvenile. To date, Turning Point is certified platinum and the lead single double-platinum.

In February 2006, Mario filed a lawsuit against his former manager, Troy Patterson, alleging that Patterson had paid him $50,000 for the sale of more than 3 million records, which was later found to be false accusations. Mario was later sued by Patterson and lost. Mario's new manager is J. Erving, and he was chosen by Mario.

=== 2007–2008: Go ===
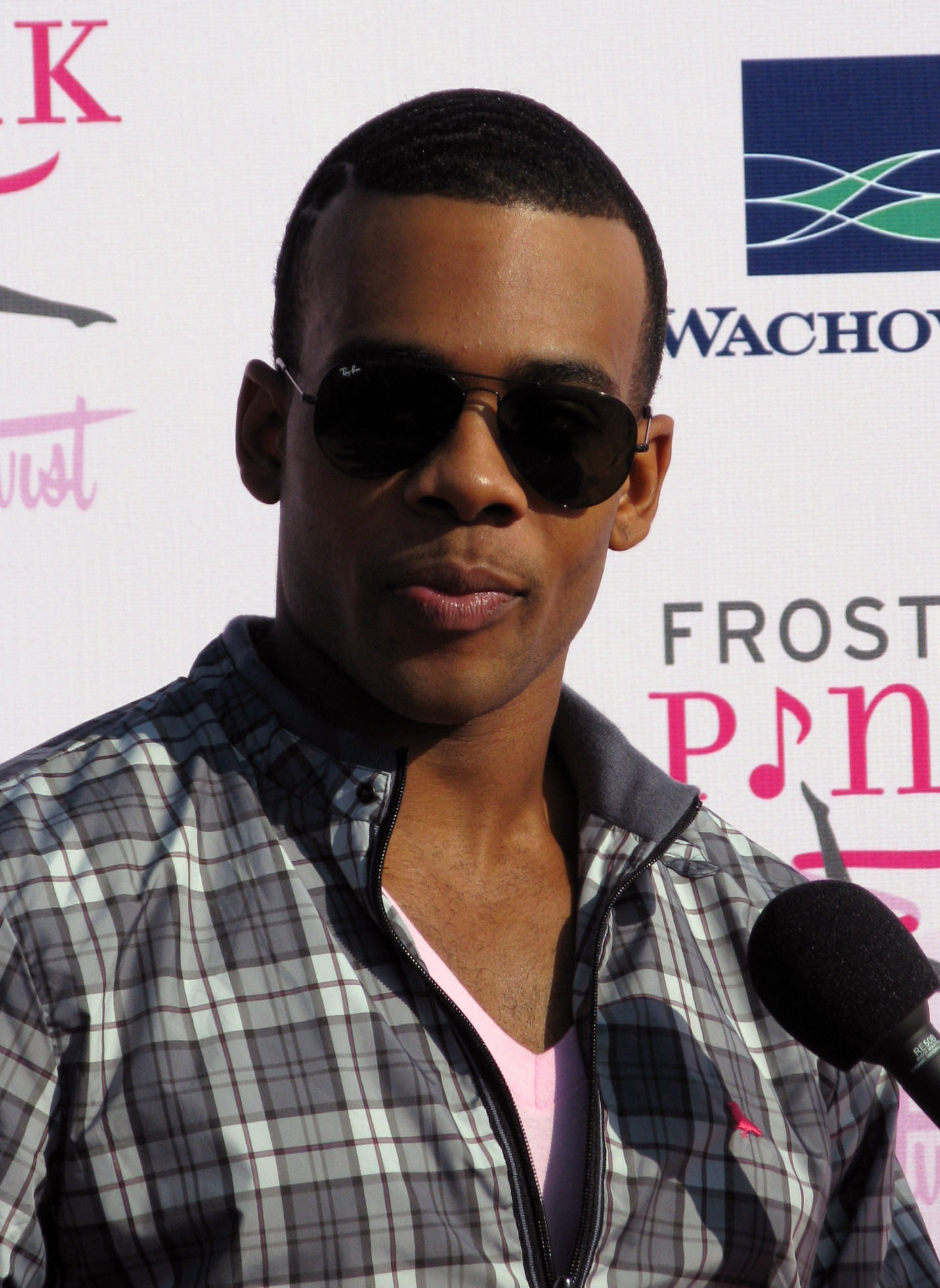
Mario in 2008

Mario's third album Go is dedicated to his mom Shawntia Hardaway and was released in South Africa under Gallo Records on October 9, 2007, in the U.S. on December 11, 2007. The album includes collaborations with Jermaine Dupri, Ne-Yo, Janice Robinson, Scott Storch, Jimmy Jam and Terry Lewis, Timbaland and Bryan-Michael Cox. Mario had more creative control on Go than on his previous two albums. The first single from the album was "How Do I Breathe" which was released in May. The second single was "Crying Out for Me" after a poll on his website. The single was later certificated Gold by the RIAA. On December 13, 2007, Mario was on "106 & Park" where he stated that the third single off the album will be "Music for Love". The album was made available for the public to listen to on his Myspace page before its release. He released the song "Do Right" on December 11. Go has sold 331,540 copies in the U.S.

In an interview with DJ "Z", Mario stated that problems with the record label caused the album launch to be pushed back 6–8 months. In 2008, Mario competed on season six of Dancing With the Stars. He was partnered with Karina Smirnoff. They were eliminated in week eight of the competition.

=== 2009–2010: D.N.A. ===
In a 2009 interview with Rap-Up, Mario said that "Soul Truth Entertainment" was his new entertainment company. Before the release of his third album Go, Mario confirmed in an interview with that he was working on a new album "by the time school starts back up, like after next summer" "But there's really even more than that, 'cause I'm gonna start recording, like, [at] the end of January". The album is involving a wide range of producers and songwriters such as Darkchild, Babyface, Polow da Don, RedOne, and CJ of Charlio Productions, Malay, Jazze Pha, Stargate, KP, Tricky Stewart and The-Dream. Mario said that he would like to work with no more than four producers for this album. Mario has described this album as world music, an old school R&B influenced with a modern dance pop sound. The album is being described as his "most personal, colossal album of his career."

In January 2009, Mario became the face of Pelle Pelle's European Spring/Summer campaign with various press shots running through the first part of the year. For his fourth album D.N.A., the lead single "Break Up" was released on April 28, 2009. The song features Sean "The Pen" Garrett and Gucci Mane. In the U.S., the song peaked at number 2 on the Hot R&B/Hip-Hop Chart and 14 on the Billboard Hot 100, becoming Mario's most successful single in five years. The single has been certified Gold by the Recording Industry Association of America (RIAA) for a shipment of over 500,000 units. "Thinkin' About You", was released as the second single reaching number forty-five on the Hot R&B/Hip-Hop Chart. "Stranded" was never labeled as the third single due to the limited airplay that it received. Lack of interest led to the single being canceled, although in January 2010 the song entered on the Billboard Hot R&B/Hip-Hop Songs peaking at number 84. "Ooh Baby" was later confirmed to be the third single from the album, it peaked on the week of March 19, 2010 debuting on the Billboard Hot 100 at number 95. The album was made available for the public to listen to on his Myspace page before its release. The album debuted at number nine on the Billboard 200, selling 38,000 copies in its first week, becoming Mario's lowest-selling debut in the United States. So far, it has sold 93,385 copies in the U.S.

=== 2011–2016: Canceled albums and departure from RCA Records ===
Mario recorded an album with producer Rico Love from 2010 to mid-2011 under the tentative title Restoration. Songs from this album included "My Bed", "Killa", "Bermuda", "The Walls", "Recovery", "Falling Down" and "Computer Love". During Mario's appearance on BET's 106 & Park on July 10, 2013, Mario stated that he felt the album recorded with Rico Love did not feel part of his career plan and that he scrapped that album and went on to record his then titled album Evolve, which was set to be released in September 2013, but was delayed to 2014. For his fifth album, Mario stated the album will include "Love songs, ballads, club records and general R&B", and has said there will be no EDM songs on this album. Mario took writers Jeremiah "Sickpen" Bethea and Jimi Bonet under his wing amongst others to write for this album. Production on the album includes work by Glass John, Bam Alexander, Polow da Don and possibly Ne-Yo.

In an interview with Vibe, Mario was asked what direction he was trying to go with on his fifth album; his answer was, "I wanna give as much honesty as I can. I want to be honest, but grab the attention of everybody, but still compete so when you hear it on the radio it's pushing the envelope. The melodies coming out of me now are unorthodox— melodies I've never expressed before". He also confirmed he has five tracks that are definitely going on. "These tracks are like movies, they are intense", he added. Nevertheless, the album will probably feature a song centered on his mother, written by himself. In August 2011, RCA Music Group announced it was disbanding J Records along with Arista Records and Jive Records. With the shutdown, Mario, and all other artists previously signed to these three labels, will release his future albums on the RCA Records label.

Through his official Twitter page, on May 17, 2013, Mario confirmed that he has been working with Polow Da Don, for the lead single "Somebody Else" featuring rapper Nicki Minaj was already recorded and released. The song was made available in the iTunes Store on May 21, 2013. He thanked Polow Da Don, Jeremiah Renaldo, Nicki Minaj and CJ Hilton for composing the song. He stated that his album would be released in September 2013 and may include guest appearances from Minaj, J. Cole and Sevyn Streeter. "Fatal Distraction" will be his next single. Mario announced during a USTREAM interview with Music Choice, his album will be released in October 2013 but was pushed back. The second single "Fatal Distraction" was released on September 10, 2013. After that, Mario parted ways with RCA Records due to creative differences.

In the summer of 2015, Mario announced that he was planning on releasing a new album, titled Never 2 Late, it was scheduled to be released on December 4, 2015, but this album release never materialized due to disagreements with management. It was to be supported by the single "Forever" featuring Rick Ross, produced by Scott Storch and Draydel which was only leaked online but never was released commercially. The album, which was completely produced by Storch, has been indefinitely shelved.

=== 2016–present: New Citizen label, Dancing Shadows, Closer to Mars EP and upcoming sixth album ===
In May 2016, Mario premiered his new single, "I Need More" on Zane Lowe's Beats 1 show. He also announced that his fifth studio album would be now titled Paradise Cove, that is set to be released off of his newly founded independent label New Citizen. On December 13, 2016, he released the second single off the album, which is called "Let Me Help You".

In March 2017, in an interview with Music Choice, Mario revealed that his fifth album will be no longer called Paradise Cove and that the new album title is called Cosmo 17, stating "The new album title is Cosmo 17, and I love Paradise Cove too absolutely. I can't say that this album has an island vibe. I think "Let Me Help You" is the only record. The rest of the album developing it, it kinda took a life of its own. It's kinda like I was talkin to myself as a kid telling him like, love still exists like it's still real like you know you still believe in it don't give up, and if you can't find it here on earth maybe you gotta go to the cosmos to find it."

He has released a new single from Cosmos 17 "Pain is the New Pleasure" on June 16, 2017. In October, he collaborated with THRDL!FE and Kelli-Leigh on a new charity single called "For Love".

Mario in 2026

Mario spoke with the FunX radio station during the Oh My! Music Festival in June 2018, announcing that the album Cosmo 17 is now re-titled Dancing Shadows and will be released in the late fall with a new single called "Drowning": "We changed the name of it. Making an album is like giving birth to something. You go through different names and different vibes."

On July 20, 2018, Mario released "Drowning" and the accompanying music video. "This song is about being faced with the reality of having multiple women I love for different reasons," he said in a press statement.

On September 14, 2018, the title track of Mario's fifth album of the same name was released. On October 5, 2018, Dancing Shadows was finally released.

Mario released the single "Closer", on April 24, 2020; it appears on his EP Closer to Mars, which was released on October 16, 2020, while his upcoming sixth album is set to release sometime in 2021. "Mars" was released as the second single from the EP on October 2, 2020, alongside its music video. The third single "Pretty Mouth Magick" was released on October 16, 2020, alongside its music video.

In 2024, Mario competed in season twelve of The Masked Singer as "Wasp" where Ne-Yo (who competed as "Cow" in season ten) served as his Mask Ambassador. He finished in second place, did an encore performance of "Let Me Love You", and even figured out that "Buffalos" was Boyz II Men.

== Other ventures ==
=== Acting career ===
Mario starred as Miles Darby in Step Up, a dance-themed film released on August 11, 2006. He also appeared in Freedom Writers, which was released on January 5, 2007. Mario did not take acting classes before undertaking the role. Mario has stated that he would like to own his own film production company titled "Inside Paris Productions" and become a director. On March 5, 2009, Mario said on Twitter that he had made an ABC network testing for a new pilot. As result, he made an announcement to The Electric Company on PBS, with the "Soft G". He starred in One on One as Spirit's date to the dance. In 2019, he portrayed the character "Benny" in the Emmy Award winning musical Rent: Live.

=== Knightwritaz ===
Knightwritaz
- Years active: 2005—2010
- Past members: Marsha; Sterling Simms; Oak Felder; Jamila Rose; Mario

Formed in 2005, Knightwritaz is a production team of which Mario was part of. The team included Sterling Simms, Warren "Oak" Felder and Marsha of Floetry. Aside from producing songs for Mario's third album Go (2008), the team has written and produced songs for Jennifer Lopez, Chris Brown, Jordin Sparks, Usher and Raven-Symoné. Having seldom worked as a collective fivesome, Mario claimed to be more of the songwriter in the team by 2007. In 2009, he stated that he was no longer part of the group.

=== Do Right Foundation ===
Mario's Do Right Foundation was established in March 2008 to educate and inspire children who suffer from the drug addictions of their parents. In May, Mario published a notice on the Facebook page of the foundation, saying that he had been in a studio in Miami all night re-recording the song "Do Right" from his 2007 album Go.

=== New Citizen LLC ===
New Citizen LLC
- Founded: 2016
- Founder: Mario
- Status: Active
- Distributors: Empire Distribution (former); The Orchard (former) Epic Records
- Country of origin: United States

Since 2016, Mario founded his independent record label New Citizen LLC, and has signed a partnership deal with EMPIRE for distribution. In 2020, Mario partnered with The Orchard to distribute future music releases after he parted ways from EMPIRE.

== Personal life ==
MTV aired a special on October 21, 2007, I Won't Love You to Death: The Story of Mario and His Mom, which dealt with his mother's heroin addiction. The documentary is about how the singer strives for help to stop his mother's addiction. While doing this, he seeks help from family and friends. Mario wrote a letter to his mother stating how appreciative he is and begs her to stop her addiction. At the end of the letter he says, "I love you, but I won't love you to death". On the documentary, produced by Gigantic! Productions, he won the 2008's Prism Award for its accurate portrayal of drug abuse. Mario has written a song titled "Do Right" that is dedicated to his mother. This song explains his mother's addiction and how it affected his childhood. The song is featured on his third album Go.

In 2009, Mario endorsed PETA in the campaign against killing animals titled "Ink, Not Mink". He tells: "Be comfortable in your own skin, and let animals keep theirs". Mario has homes in Baltimore, Atlanta, and Los Angeles.

In August 2025, Mario revealed via his Instagram stories that he is expecting his first child with girlfriend Esmeralda Rios.

== Awards and nominations ==
Award	Year	Nominee(s)	Category	Result	Ref.
MTV Europe Music Awards	2005	Himself	Best R&B	Nominated	
Teen Choice Awards	2005	Himself	Choice Music: R&B Artist	Nominated	
Teen Choice Awards	2005	"Let Me Love You"	Choice Music: R&B/Hip-Hop Track	Nominated	
Teen Choice Awards	2005	"Let Me Love You"	Choice Music: Love Song	Nominated	

== Discography ==
Studio albums

- Mario (2002)
- Turning Point (2004)
- Go (2007)
- D.N.A. (2009)
- Dancing Shadows (2018)
- Glad You Came (2024)
- Mood Swings (2025)

== Filmography ==
=== Film ===
Year	Title	Role	Notes
2004	Uncle P	Himself	
2006	Step Up	Miles Darby	
2007	Freedom Writers	Andre Bryant	
2012	Destination Fame	Wizzy	Video
2019	Rent: Live	Benjamin "Benny" Coffin III	TV movie
2024	Style Me for Christmas	Tedee Maxwell	TV movie

=== Television ===
Year	Title	Role	Notes
2003	The Saturday Show	Himself	Episode: "Episode #1.90"
2003	One on One	Marvin	Episode: "The Test"
2003	Sabrina, the Teenage Witch	Himself	Episode: "What a Witch Wants"
2004	Steve Harvey's Big Time Challenge	Himself	Episode: "Episode #2.9"
2004	Showtime at the Apollo	Himself	Episode: "Mario/Freddie Jackson"
2005	Soul Train	Himself	Episode: "Mario/Lyfe Jennings"
2005	Punk'd	Himself	Episode: "Episode #4.1"
2005	All of Us	Himself	Episode: "Movin’ on Up"
2005	Top of the Pops	Himself	Recurring Guest
2005	Mad TV	Himself	Episode: "Episode #11.8"
2005	Showtime at the Apollo	Himself	Episode: "Mario/Jadakiss"
2008	Dancing with the Stars	Himself	Contestant: Season 6
2008	Battleground Earth	Himself	Episode: "Downtown Battleground"
2009–2010	The Electric Company	Himself	Recurring Guest: Season 1–2
2014	Love That Girl!	Terrence	Episode: "Gullible Is as Gullible Does"
2016	Greatest Hits	Himself	Episode: "Greatest Hits: 2000–2005"
2018–2020	Empire	Devon	Recurring Cast: Season 5, Main Cast: Season 6
2019	Song Association	Himself	Episode: "Mario"
2020	Wild 'n Out	Himself/Team Captain	Episode: "Mario"
2022	Unsung	Himself	Episode: "Warryn Campbell"
2024	All the Queen's Men		Recurring role: Season 4
2024	The Masked Singer	Himself/Wasp	Season 12 contestant; Finished in 2nd Place
2025	Last Week Tonight	Himself	Episode: "Trump & Tariffs"

== Tour ==
- Crushin' It World Tour (2016)
- Mario's Concert Tour (2021)
- The Millennium Tour: Turned Up! (2022)
- Champagne and Roses Tour (2023 - 2024)
- The For My Fans Tour (2024)

=== Virtual concert ===
- The Luxury of Love. Live. (2021)

== See also ==
- List of dancers
