= Jim Jones discography =

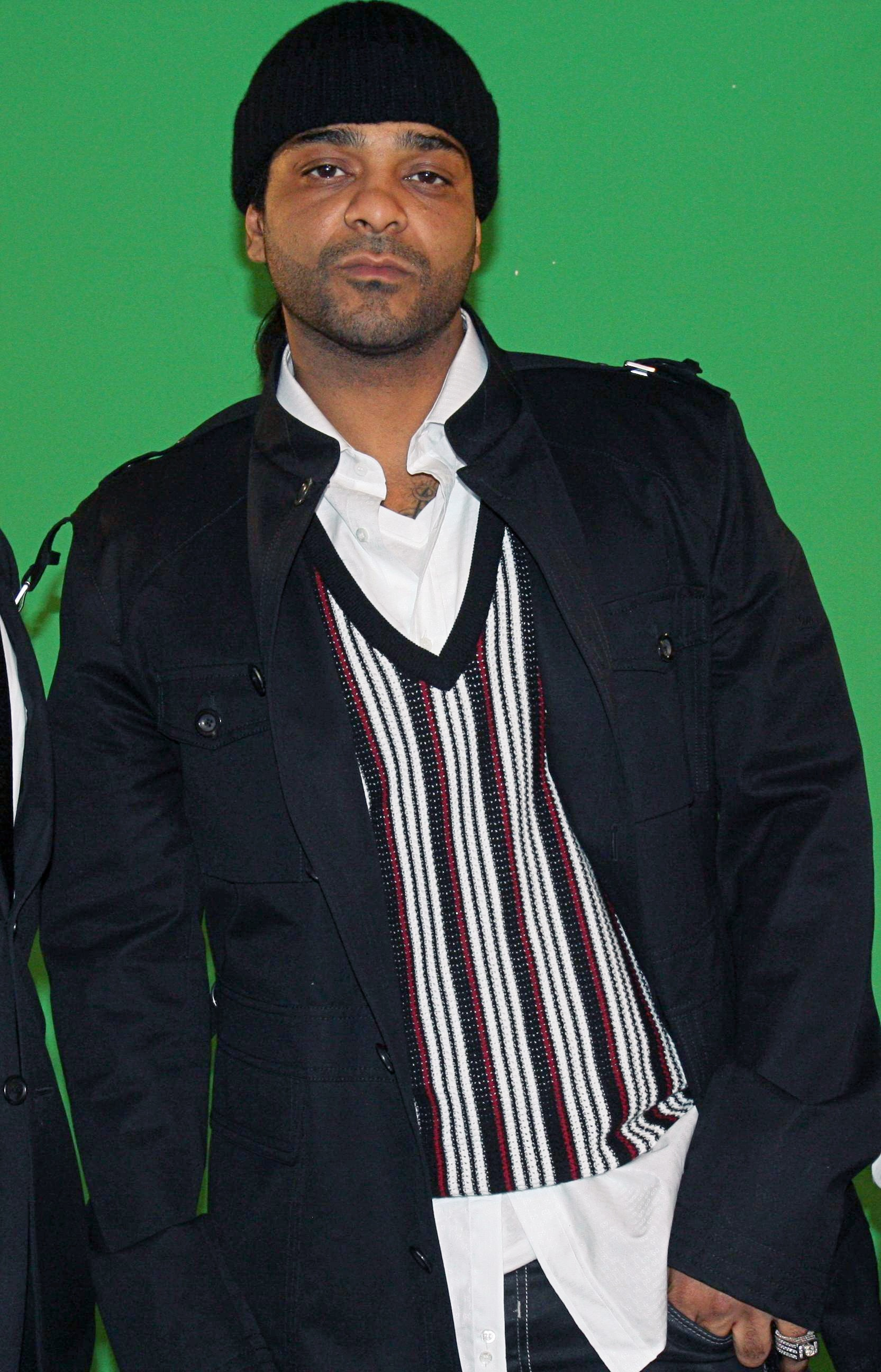
- Jones at the 5th Annual Hip-Hop Summit Action Network's Action Awards in New York City in February 2008
- Studio albums: 8
- Extended plays: 2
- Compilation albums: 3
- Singles: 47
- Collaborative albums: 5
- Mixtapes: 19

American rapper Jim Jones has released eight studio albums, five collaborative albums, three compilation albums, two extended plays (EPs), nineteen mixtapes and 47 singles (including 17 as a featured artist). Jones is perhaps best known for being a member of East Coast hip hop group The Diplomats (also known as Dipset), with whom he recorded several mixtapes with before releasing their debut album Diplomatic Immunity, in 2003. In August 2004, Jones released his solo debut album On My Way to Church, under Diplomat Records and E1 Music (formerly Koch Records). The album was preceded by the release of the singles "Certified Gangstas" and "Crunk Muzik", the latter of which features his Dipset-cohorts Juelz Santana and Cam'ron, and also supported the release of Dipset's second album Diplomatic Immunity 2 (2004).

In August 2005, Jones followed up with his second album Harlem: Diary of a Summer, which spawned the singles "Baby Girl" (featuring Max B), "Summer wit Miami" (featuring Trey Songz) and "What You Been Drankin On?" (featuring P. Diddy, Paul Wall and Jha Jha). In 2006, Jones released his most successful album to date, Hustler's P.O.M.E. (Product of My Environment). The album, which charted at number six on the US Billboard 200 chart, features his biggest hit single to date. The song, titled "We Fly High", reached number five on the US Billboard Hot 100 chart and was certified platinum by the Recording Industry Association of America (RIAA). In December 2006, Jones released a Christmas-themed compilation album titled A Dipset X-Mas. The album includes the popular remix to "We Fly High", which features verses from fellow American rappers T.I., Diddy, Juelz Santana, Birdman, Jermaine Dupri and Young Dro.

After releasing several mixtapes for free online, Jones chose to release his eighth mixtape, titled Harlem's American Gangster, for retail. The album was supported by the singles "Looking At the Game", featuring now-deceased rapper Stack Bundles and "Love Me No More". Jones later teamed up with his hip hop group ByrdGang, which he founded in 2006, to release their debut album M.O.B.: The Album, in July 2008. In November 2008, Jones released a second Christmas compilation, titled A Tribute to Bad Santa Starring Mike Epps, in collaboration with Juelz Santana's hip hop group Skull Gang.

In March 2009, Jones released his first major label album, Pray IV Reign, under Columbia Records. The album's lead single, titled "Pop Champagne", features vocals from Juelz Santana and the song's producer Ron Browz. "Pop Champagne" reached number 22 on the US Billboard Hot 100 chart and was certified gold by the RIAA. In October 2009, Jones collaborated with fellow New York City-based rapper DJ Webstar, to release an album titled The Rooftop, which includes the single "Dancin on Me". After releasing several mixtapes, Jones released his fifth album Capo in April 2011, which spawned the singles "Perfect Day" and "Everybody Jones". On October 31, 2011, Jones released a mixtape titled Vampire Life: We Own the Night. He went on to release two more installments of his Vampire Life series, before releasing an EP titled We Own the Night, in a reboot of the series. The EP was supported by the single "Nasty Girl", featuring Jeremih and DJ Spinking. On September 9, 2014, he released the EP We Own the Night Pt. 2: Memoirs of a Hustler.

== Albums ==
=== Studio albums ===
List of studio albums, with selected chart positions
| Title | Album details | Peak chart positions | | | |
| Title | Album details | US | US Ind. | US R&B | US Rap |
|---|---|---|---|---|---|
| On My Way to Church | Released: August 24, 2004; Label: Diplomat, Koch; Format: CD, LP, digital download | 18 | 3 | 4 | 3 |
| Harlem: Diary of a Summer | Released: August 23, 2005; Label: Diplomat, Koch; Format: CD, digital download | 5 | 1 | 1 | 1 |
| Hustler's P.O.M.E. (Product of My Environment) | Released: November 7, 2006; Label: Diplomat, Koch; Format: CD, LP, digital download | 6 | 1 | 1 | 1 |
| Pray IV Reign | Released: March 24, 2009; Label: Columbia, E1 Music; Format: CD, digital download | 9 | — | 2 | 1 |
| Capo | Released: April 5, 2011; Label: E1 Music; Format: CD, digital download | 20 | 6 | 5 | 2 |
| Wasted Talent | Released: April 13, 2018; Label: VL, Empire; Format: CD, digital download | 131 | 11 | — | — |
| El Capo | Released: May 31, 2019; Label: VL, Empire; Format: Digital download | 114 | 15 | — | — |
| At the Church Steps | Released: February 28, 2025; Label: VL, Hitmaker; Format: LP, digital download | — | — | — | — |
| The Fall Before the Rise | Released: November 7, 2025; Label: VL, Hitmaker; Format: Digital download | — | — | — | — |
| The Landlord | Released: June 12, 2026; Label: VL, Hitmaker; Format: Digital download | — | — | — | — |
"—" denotes a recording that did not chart.

=== Collaborative albums ===
List of collaborative albums, with selected chart positions
| Title | Album details | Peak chart positions | | |
| Title | Album details | US Ind. | US R&B | US Rap |
|---|---|---|---|---|
| The Rooftop (with DJ Webstar) | Released: October 6, 2009; Label: Scrilla Hill, E1 Music; Format: CD, digital download | 42 | 33 | 16 |
| The Fraud Department (with Harry Fraud) | Released: February 19, 2021; Label: The Fraud Department, Empire; Format: CD, digital download | — | — | — |
| Gangsta Grillz: We Set the Trends (with DJ Drama) | Released: January 14, 2022; Label: VL, Empire; Format: Digital download | — | — | — |
| The Lobby Boyz (with Maino) | Released: May 27, 2022; Label: Lobby Boyz; Format: Digital download | — | — | — |
| Back In My Prime (with Hitmaka) | Released: March 10, 2023; Label: VL, Empire; Format: Digital download | — | — | — |
"—" denotes a recording that did not chart.

=== Compilation albums ===
List of compilation albums, with selected chart positions
| Title | Album details | Peak chart positions | | |
| Title | Album details | US Holiday | US Ind. | US R&B |
|---|---|---|---|---|
| A Dipset X-Mas | Released: December 5, 2006; Label: Diplomat, Koch; Format: CD, digital download | 5 | 28 | 64 |
| A Tribute to Bad Santa Starring Mike Epps | Released: November 25, 2008; Label: Koch; Format: CD, digital download | — | — | — |
| 12 Days of Xmas | Released: December 13, 2022; Label: VL, Empire; Format: Digital download | — | — | — |
"—" denotes a recording that did not chart.

== Extended plays ==
List of extended plays, with selected chart positions
| Title | EP details | Peak chart positions | |
| Title | EP details | US R&B | US Rap |
|---|---|---|---|
| We Own the Night | Released: December 3, 2013; Label: VL; Format: Digital download | — | — |
| We Own the Night Pt. 2: Memoirs of a Hustler | Released: September 9, 2014; Label: VL, Empire; Format: Digital download | 38 | 22 |
"—" denotes a recording that did not chart.

== Mixtapes ==
List of mixtapes, with selected chart positions
| Title | Mixtape details | Peak chart positions | | | |
| Title | Mixtape details | US | US Ind. | US R&B | US Rap |
|---|---|---|---|---|---|
| Ryder Muzik | Released: February 2004; Format: Digital download | — | — | — | — |
| Ambitionz of a Gangsta | Released: August 2004; Format: Digital download | — | — | — | — |
| City of God | Released: June 13, 2005; Format: Digital download | — | — | — | — |
| Jim Jones Presents: M.O.B. (with ByrdGang) | Released: July 15, 2006; Format: Digital download | — | — | — | — |
| The Seven Day Theory | Released: September 27, 2006; Format: Digital download | — | — | — | — |
| The Jim Jones Chronicles | Released: October 26, 2007; Format: Digital download | — | — | — | — |
| Members of Byrdgang Vol. 2 (with ByrdGang) | Released: 2007; Format: Digital download | — | — | — | — |
| Harlem's American Gangster | Released: February 19, 2008; Label: Koch, Diplomat; Format: Digital download | 19 | 1 | 3 | 1 |
| Street Religion (Love Me No More Special Edition) | Released: April 18, 2008; Format: Digital download | — | — | — | — |
| Jockin' Jim Jones | Released: January 23, 2009; Format: Digital download | — | — | — | — |
| Pray IV Reign: The Mixtape | Released: March 9, 2009; Format: Digital download | — | — | 38 | 11 |
| Street Religion (Heron 3:16) | Released: March 17, 2009; Format: Digital download | — | — | — | — |
| The Ghost of Rich Porter | Released: March 23, 2010; Format: Digital download | — | — | — | — |
| Capo Life | Released: November 3, 2010; Format: Digital download | — | — | — | — |
| Vampire Life: We Own the Night | Released: October 31, 2011; Format: Digital download | — | — | 63 | — |
| Vampire Life 2: F.E.A.S.T. The Last Supper | Released: May 1, 2012; Format: Digital download | — | — | — | — |
| Vampire Life 3 | Released: August 15, 2013; Format: Digital download | — | — | — | — |
| Miami Vampin | Released: May 21, 2015; Format: Digital download | — | — | — | — |
| The Kitchen | Released: June 3, 2016; Label: VL, Empire; Format: Digital download | — | — | — | — |
"—" denotes a recording that did not chart.

== Singles ==
=== As lead artist ===
List of singles as a lead artist, with selected chart positions and certifications, showing year released and album name
| Title | Year | Peak chart positions | | | | | | Certifications | Album |
| Title | Year | US | US Pop | US R&B | US Rap | US Rhyth. | CAN CHR. | Certifications | Album |
|---|---|---|---|---|---|---|---|---|---|
| "Certified Gangstas" (featuring Cam'ron and Jay Bezel) | 2004 | — | — | 80 | — | — | — | | On My Way to Church |
| "Crunk Muzik" (featuring Juelz Santana and Cam'ron) | 2004 | — | — | 84 | — | — | — | | On My Way to Church |
| "Baby Girl" (featuring Max B) | 2005 | — | — | 58 | — | — | — | | Harlem: Diary of a Summer |
| "Summer wit Miami" (featuring Trey Songz) | 2005 | — | — | 78 | — | — | — | | Harlem: Diary of a Summer |
| "What You Been Drankin' On?" (featuring P. Diddy, Paul Wall and Jha Jha) | 2005 | — | — | — (Note: "What You Been Drankin' On?" did not enter the Hot R&B/Hip-Hop Songs chart, but peaked at number six on the Bubbling Under R&B/Hip-Hop Singles chart.) | — | — | — | | Harlem: Diary of a Summer |
| "We Fly High" | 2006 | 5 | 32 | 4 | 1 | 2 | 47 | RIAA: Platinum | Hustler's P.O.M.E. (Product of My Environment) |
| "Emotionless" (featuring Juelz Santana) | 2007 | — | — | 91 | — | — | — | | Hustler's P.O.M.E. (Product of My Environment) |
| "Looking At the Game" (featuring Stack Bundles) | 2007 | — | — | — | — | — | — | | Harlem's American Gangster |
| "Love Me No More" (featuring Kobe) | 2008 | — | — | — (Note: "Love Me No More" did not enter the Hot R&B/Hip-Hop Songs chart, but peaked at number three on the Bubbling Under R&B/Hip-Hop Singles chart.) | — | — | — | | Harlem's American Gangster |
| "The Good Stuff" (featuring NOE) | 2008 | — | — | — (Note: "The Good Stuff" did not enter the Hot R&B/Hip-Hop Songs chart, but peaked at number three on the Bubbling Under R&B/Hip-Hop Singles chart.) | — | — | — | | Non-album single |
| "Pop Champagne" (featuring Ron Browz and Juelz Santana) | 2008 | 22 | — (Note: "Pop Champagne" did not enter the Mainstream Top 40 chart, but peaked at number 45 on the Pop 100 chart.) | 3 | 3 | 8 | — | RIAA: Gold | Pray IV Reign |
| "Na Na Nana Na Na" (featuring Bree-Beauty) | 2009 | — | — | 75 | — | — | — | | Pray IV Reign |
| "Dancin on Me" (with Webstar featuring Juelz Santana) | 2009 | — (Note: "Dancin on Me" did not enter the Billboard Hot 100, but peaked at number four on the Bubbling Under Hot 100 Singles chart.) | — | 48 | 19 | 39 | — | | The Rooftop |
| "She Can Get It" (with Webstar) | 2009 | — | — | — | — | — | — | | The Rooftop |
| "Ball" (featuring DJ Khaled and Schife) | 2010 | — | — | — | — | — | — | | Victory |
| "Summer Where You Been" (featuring Starr) | 2010 | — | — | — | — | — | — | | Non-album single |
| "Blow Your Smoke" (featuring Rell) | 2010 | — | — | — | — | — | — | | Capo Life |
| "Perfect Day" (featuring Chink Santana and Logic) | 2010 | — | — | 67 | — | — | — | | Capo |
| "Everybody Jones" (featuring Aaron Lacrate) | 2011 | — | — | — | — | — | — | | Capo |
| "Better Me" (featuring Robbie Nova) | 2012 | — | — | — | — | — | — | | Non-album single |
| "Nasty Girl" (featuring Jeremih and DJ Spinking) | 2013 | — | — | — | — | — | — | | We Own the Night |
| "Wolves & Vamps" (with Mischief and Sub-Zer0) | 2013 | — | — | — | — | — | — | | Non-album single |
| "Wit the Sh!t" (featuring Trey Songz) | 2014 | — | — | — | — | — | — | | We Own the Night Pt. 2: Memoirs of a Hustler |
| "Ocho" (featuring Ball Greezy and YD) | 2014 | — | — | — | — | — | — | | We Own the Night Pt. 2: Memoirs of a Hustler |
| "Finesse" (featuring A$AP Ferg, Rich Homie Quan and Desiigner) | 2016 | — | — | — | — | — | — | | The Kitchen |
| "Harlem" (featuring A$AP Ferg) | 2016 | — | — | — | — | — | — | | The Kitchen |
| "Bada Bing" (featuring French Montana) | 2021 | — | — | — | — | — | — | | The Fraud Department |
| "Lose Lose" | 2021 | — | — | — | — | — | — | | The Fraud Department |
| "We Set the Trends" (with Migos) | 2021 | — | — | — (Note: "We Set the Trends" did not enter the Hot R&B/Hip-Hop Songs chart, but peaked at number 49 on the R&B/Hip-Hop Airplay chart.) | — | — | | RIAA: Gold | Gangsta Grillz: We Set the Trends |
| "We Set the Trends" (Remix) (with Lil Wayne and DJ Khaled featuring Migos and Juelz Santana) | 2022 | — | — | — | — | — | — | | Non-album single |
"—" denotes a recording that did not chart or was not released in that territory.

=== As featured artist ===
List of singles as a featured artist, with selected chart positions, showing year released and album name
| Title | Year | Peak chart positions | Album |
| Title | Year | US R&B | Album |
|---|---|---|---|
| "I Love You" (Cheri Dennis featuring Jim Jones and Yung Joc) | 2006 | 38 | In and Out of Love |
| "Sticky Icky" (Pitbull featuring Jim Jones) | 2007 | — | The Boatlift |
| "Now I Can Do That" (Bake Up Boyz featuring Jim Jones) | 2007 | — (Note: "Now I Can Do That" did not enter the Hot R&B/Hip-Hop Songs chart, but peaked at number eight on the Bubbling Under R&B/Hip-Hop Singles chart.) | Fresh Out da Kitchen |
| "Foolish" (Remix) (Shawty Lo featuring DJ Khaled, Birdman, Rick Ross and Jim Jones) | 2008 | — | Non-album single |
| "To All My Hustlers" (Chain Gang Parolees featuring Jim Jones) | 2008 | — (Note: "To All My Hustlers" did not enter the Hot R&B/Hip-Hop Songs chart, but peaked at number five on the Bubbling Under R&B/Hip-Hop Singles chart.) | The Game |
| "That's Right" (Three 6 Mafia featuring Akon and Jim Jones) | 2008 | 97 | Last 2 Walk |
| "My Swagg" (Big Chief featuring Jim Jones) | 2008 | 84 | My Swagg (The Eat Greedy EP, Vol. 1) |
| "So Sharp" (Mack 10 featuring Jim Jones and Lil Wayne) | 2009 | 80 | Non-album single |
| "Wut You Talkin Bout" (Hussein Fatal featuring Jim Jones) | 2009 | — | Born Legendary |
| "I Love Her" (Marques Houston featuring Jim Jones) | 2009 | 85 | Mr. Houston |
| "Move" (N.O.R.E. featuring Nina Sky and Jim Jones) | 2009 | — | S.O.R.E. |
| "Bo'fum" (Hustle Boy featuring Jim Jones) | 2009 | — | Non-album single |
| "Blockstars" (DJ Kay Slay featuring Ray J, Yo Gotti, Busta Rhymes and Jim Jones) | 2009 | — | More Than Just a DJ |
| "SupaFine" (Akari featuring Jim Jones) | 2009 | — | Non-album singles |
| "Billionaire" (Prince Malik featuring Jim Jones and Lil Mama) | 2010 | — | Non-album singles |
| "Rock n Roll" (Raekwon featuring Jim Jones, Ghostface Killah and Kobe Honeycutt) | 2011 | — | Shaolin vs. Wu-Tang |
| "Back to Me" (Jahyda Cristine featuring Jim Jones) | 2013 | — | Non-album single |
"—" denotes a recording that did not chart.

== Guest appearances ==
List of non-single guest appearances, with other performing artists, showing year released and album name
| Title | Year | Other performer(s) | Album |
|---|---|---|---|
| "Me, My Moms & Jimmy" | 1998 | Cam'ron, Fredericka | Confessions of Fire |
| "Do It Again" | 2000 | Cam'ron, Destiny's Child | S.D.E. |
| "My Hood" | 2000 | Cam'ron | S.D.E. |
| "Come Home with Me" | 2002 | Cam'ron, Juelz Santana | Come Home with Me |
| "Dead or Alive" | 2002 | Cam'ron | Come Home with Me |
| "Oh Girl" (Oh Boy Remix) | 2002 | Cam'ron, Birdman, TQ | —N/a |
| "Where I Go" | 2003 | Juelz Santana | From Me to U |
| "My Love" (Remix) | 2003 | Juelz Santana | From Me to U |
| "This Is for My Homies" | 2003 | Juelz Santana | From Me to U |
| "The Dope Man" | 2004 | Cam'ron | Purple Haze |
| "Y'all Don't Want It" | 2004 | Lil' Flip | U Gotta Feel Me |
| "Soul Survivor" (Remix) | 2005 | Young Jeezy, Boyz n da Hood, Akon | —N/a |
| "The French Connection" | 2005 | Purple City | Paris to Purple City |
| "Intro" | 2005 | Sky Balla, Sha Money XL, Mac Minister, Tone Capone | Mobb Report |
| "I'm with Whateva" | 2005 | The Notorious B.I.G., Juelz Santana, Lil Wayne | Duets: The Final Chapter |
| "Goonies" | 2006 | J.R. Writer, Hell Rell | History in the Making |
| "Bricks 4 the High" | 2006 | Dem Franchize Boyz, Dame Dash | On Top of Our Game |
| "Coming Around tha Corner" | 2006 | Trae | Restless |
| "This Is That" | 2006 | Juelz Santana, Game | Back Like Cooked Crack Pt. 3 |
| "Ice Box" (Remix) | 2006 | Omarion | —N/a |
| "I Luv It" (Remix) | 2006 | Young Jeezy, Busta Rhymes, Trina, Lil' Flip | —N/a |
| "Throw Some D's" (Remix) | 2006 | Rich Boy, André 3000, Nelly, Murphy Lee, Game | —N/a |
| "It's Okay (One Blood)" (Remix) | 2006 | The Game, Snoop Dogg, Nas, T.I., Fat Joe, Lil Wayne, N.O.R.E., Jadakiss, Styles P, Fabolous, Juelz Santana, Rick Ross, Twista, Kurupt, Daz Dillinger, WC, E-40, Bun B, Chamillionaire, Slim Thug, Young Dro, Clipse, Ja Rule | Doctor's Advocate |
| "No Hook" | 2007 | DJ Khaled, Styles P, Cassidy, Rob Cash | We the Best |
| "I Get Money" | 2007 | Lil' Flip | I Need Mine |
| "Sexy Lady" (Remix) | 2007 | Yung Berg, Rich Boy | Almost Famous: The Sexy Lady EP |
| "Fly Together" | 2007 | Trey Songz | Trey Day |
| "Takin' Pictures" | 2007 | DJ Drama, Young Jeezy, Willie the Kid, Rick Ross, Young Buck, T.I. | Gangsta Grillz: The Album |
| "Cut Throat" | 2007 | Yung Joc, Game | Hustlenomics |
| "I'm Up" | 2007 | Lumidee | Unexpected |
| "730 Dip Dip" | 2007 | Freekey Zekey, Ash | Book of Ezekiel |
| "Sumtimes I (Part I)" | 2007 | Lil' Mo | Pain & Paper |
| "I Be Everywhere" | 2007 | Kia Shine | Due Season |
| "Krispy" (Remix) | 2007 | Kia Shine, Swizz Beatz, Remy Ma, E-40, Young Buck, Slim Thug, LL Cool J | —N/a |
| "Get It Shawty" (Remix) | 2007 | Lloyd, Lil Wayne, Big Boi, Chamillionaire, Ja Rule, Joe Budden | —N/a |
| "You Can't Deny It (Ridah)" | 2007 | Ashanti | —N/a |
| "Walk It Out" (Remix) | 2007 | Unk, André 3000, Big Boi | —N/a |
| "2 Step" (Remix) | 2007 | Unk, T-Pain, E-40 | —N/a |
| "Party Like a Rockstar" (Remix) | 2007 | Shop Boyz, Lil Wayne, Chamillionare | —N/a |
| "Amusement Park" (Remix)" | 2007 | 50 Cent | —N/a |
| "Wipe Me Down" (NY Remix) | 2007 | Foxx, Webbie, Lil Boosie, Fat Joe, Jadakiss | —N/a |
| "D-Block/Dipset" | 2008 | Sheek Louch, Styles P, Jadakiss, Hell Rell | Silverback Gorilla |
| "Can U Werk Wit Dat" (Remix) | 2008 | The Fixxers | —N/a |
| "Get Like Me" (Remix) | 2008 | David Banner, Chris Brown | —N/a |
| "Fuck You Hoes" | 2008 | David Banner | The Greatest Story Ever Told |
| "Dope Man" | 2008 | Dolla | —N/a |
| "Ballin'" | 2008 | Bizzy Bone | A Song For You |
| "Gangstas Don't Dance" | 2008 | Speedknot Mobstaz | Mobstability II: Nation Business |
| "We Roll" | 2008 | Pete Rock, Max B | NY's Finest |
| "The 5 Boroughs Are Back" | 2008 | LL Cool J, Method Man, Lil' Kim, KRS-One | Exit 13 |
| "Swagga Like Us" (Remix) | 2008 | Pusha T, Freeway, Fabolous | —N/a |
| "Day 'n' Nite" (Remix) | 2008 | Kid Cudi | —N/a |
| "Foolish" (Remix) | 2008 | Shawty Lo, Birdman, Rick Ross, DJ Khaled | We Global |
| "Electric Feel" (Remix) | 2008 | MGMT | —N/a |
| "The Business" (Remix) | 2008 | Yung Berg, Pleasure P, Twista, Maino, Cap 1, Casha | —N/a |
| "Big Boys" | 2008 | Big WY, Mack 10, Game | —N/a |
| "Like Ohh" (Remix) | 2008 | Grafh, Bun B, Prinz, Jadakiss | The Evolution |
| "This Girl" | 2008 | Freeky Zeeky, Lil Wayne | —N/a |
| "Fallen Soldiers" (Remix) | 2008 | Demarco | —N/a |
| "Show Out" (Remix) | 2008 | Unk, Soulja Boy Tell 'Em, Sean Kingston, E-40 | —N/a |
| "Arab Money" (Remix Part III) | 2008 | Busta Rhymes, Ron Browz, Juelz Santana, Jadakiss | —N/a |
| "I Love College" (Remix) | 2008 | Asher Roth | —N/a |
| "Headlights" | 2008 | NOE | —N/a |
| "Out In The Streets" (Remix) | 2008 | K.Maro | Perfect Stranger |
| "Bust Your Windows" (Remix) | 2009 | Jazmine Sullivan | —N/a |
| "Lost" (Remix) | 2009 | Gorilla Zoe | —N/a |
| "Who's This Girl" | 2009 | Lil Wayne | —N/a |
| "Diva" (Remix) | 2009 | Beyoncé, Pretty Ricky, Ciara | —N/a |
| "Fast Life" | 2009 | Young Keno | This Is Not A Game |
| "Turn My Swag On" (Remix) | 2009 | Soulja Boy, Lil Wayne, Maino, Jadakiss | —N/a |
| "I'm Fucked Up" | 2009 | Problem, Snoop Dogg | Deal or No Deal 2: Universal Cut The Check |
| "Certified Hustla" | 2009 | Jon Famous | —N/a |
| "Party wit a Superstar" | 2009 | Henry Smith | After Hours At The Valentine Hotel With Henry Smith Vol. 1 |
| "24's" (Remix) | 2009 | RichGirl | —N/a |
| "100$ Bills" | 2009 | Oun P | —N/a |
| "Reaction" | 2009 | NOE, Jenny Redd | —N/a |
| "Money on my Mind" | 2009 | Smoke Bulga | #Hashtags Vol. 1 #SmokeSignals |
| "Haters" | 2009 | Elephant Man, Hunt | —N/a |
| "Certified Hustla" (Remix) | 2009 | Jon Famous, Mistah F.A.B. | —N/a |
| "Birds Flyin' In" | 2009 | Skull Gang | Skull Gang |
| "Wut You Talkin Bout" | 2009 | Hussein Fatal | Born Legendary |
| "Piano Lessons" (Remix) | 2009 | Colin Munroe | —N/a |
| "Break Me Off" (Remix) | 2009 | Bossman, Gucci Mane, Raheem DeVaughn | B.O.S.S. Vol. 1: Based on Struggle and Success |
| "Plenty Money" (Remix) | 2009 | Plies | —N/a |
| "Neva Stop" (Remix) | 2009 | Juganot, Maino | —N/a |
| "Problem" | 2009 | Problem, DJ Quik | —N/a |
| "Magnum Force" | 2009 | U-God, Sheek Louch | Dopium |
| "Ricky Bobby" (Remix) | 2009 | B Hamp | —N/a |
| "Celebrate" | 2009 | Huey, Tydis | Strictly Business |
| "Ice Cream Paint Job" (Remix) | 2009 | Dorrough, Jermaine Dupri, Soulja Boy, Slim Thug, E-40, Rich Boy | Mr. D-o Double R |
| "Butterfly Tattoo" (Remix) | 2009 | Bobby V, Rick Ross | —N/a |
| "Swag'N" | 2009 | Swag | —N/a |
| "20 Dollars" (Remix) | 2009 | Ron Browz, Mase, OJ da Juiceman, Shawty Lo | Timeless |
| "Number 1 Girl" | 2009 | Akon, Ice Cube, R. Kelly, Juelz Santana | —N/a |
| "Feddy" | 2009 | DJ Infamous, Young Dro, Chubbie Baby, Rick Ross | —N/a |
| "Thug Music" | 2009 | Crime, Freeway | Streets are Contagious |
| "Hmmm" (Remix) | 2009 | Mysonne, N.O.R.E. | —N/a |
| "Harlem Forever" | 2009 | Juelz Santana, Tobb Cobain | —N/a |
| "The Other Day" | 2009 | Gucci Mane | The Cold War: Part 2 (Great Brrritain) |
| "I'm Poppin" (Remix) | 2009 | Freekey Zekey, Sen City | —N/a |
| "Ain't Nothing Like You (Hoochie Coo)" | 2009 | The Black Keys, Mos Def | BlakRoc |
| "What You Do to Me" | 2009 | The Black Keys, Billy Danze, Nicole Wray | BlakRoc |
| "Love Come Down" (Remix) | 2009 | Diddy – Dirty Money, Fabolous, Red Cafe | —N/a |
| "Buy You a Round" (Remix) | 2009 | Verse, Jermaine Dupri, OJ Da Juiceman, Juvenile, Game | —N/a |
| "Live It Luv It" (Remix) | 2009 | Freekey Zekey | —N/a |
| "Secret" | 2009 | Starr, Juelz Santana | Starr's World |
| "Showin Off" | 2009 | Vain, St.Laz | —N/a |
| "Supa Hot" (Remix) | 2009 | Sonny Rich, Nicki Minaj | —N/a |
| "Men of Respect" | 2010 | DJ Kay Slay, Rell, Tony Yayo, Papoose, Lloyd Banks | More Than Just a DJ |
| "Da Movie" | 2010 | Gravy | —N/a |
| "She Likes Me" | 2010 | Ernie Gaines | —N/a |
| "Nissan, Honda, Chevy" | 2010 | Joell Ortiz | —N/a |
| "Curve" | 2010 | J.Y., Red Café | The Hiring Process |
| "Keys To The City" | 2010 | Razah | Keys To The City |
| "I'm Just Chillin" | 2010 | Ocoop, Waka Flocka Flame | —N/a |
| "How I'm Living" | 2010 | Gucci Mane | Burrrprint (2) HD |
| "My Life Is A Movie" | 2010 | Kingpin Slim | The Beam Up 2 |
| "Cooler Than Me" (Remix) | 2010 | Mike Posner | —N/a |
| "Ain't a Thang" | 2010 | Paul Wall | Heart of a Champion |
| "I Am Bitches" | 2010 | Paypa, Game | Tunnel Vision |
| "Go Crazy" | 2010 | Roscoe Dash | Ready Set Go! |
| "Go" | 2010 | Ski, Currensy | 24 Hour Karate School |
| "Bring the Goons Out" (Remix) | 2010 | Grafh, Red Café, Bun B, Maino, Cassidy | From the Bottom |
| "Bout That" | 2010 | Grafh | From the Bottom |
| "Gangs of New York" | 2010 | Game, Jadakiss | The R.E.D. Room |
| "Opposite of Adults" (Remix) | 2010 | Chiddy Bang | —N/a |
| "Yo Momma On Ya" | 2010 | Cam'ron, Snoop Dogg | —N/a |
| "Killa" | 2010 | Cam'ron | —N/a |
| "Fantasy Girl" | 2010 | Joey B, Juelz Santana | —N/a |
| "Handcuffin’ Them Hoes" | 2010 | Ghostface Killah | Apollo Kids |
| "Christmas in Harlem" | 2010 | Kanye West, Cam’ron, Vado, Cyhi the Prynce, Pusha T, Big Sean, Teyana Taylor, Musiq Soulchild | GOOD Fridays |
| "I Feel Free" | 2010 | Ricky Blaze, Nicki Minaj | —N/a |
| "Fly in the Wind" | 2011 | Lloyd Banks | —N/a |
| "My Hood" | 2011 | Cassidy, Juelz Santana | Monster Mondays Vol. 1 |
| "We Keep It Rockin’" | 2011 | Swizz Beatz, Maino, Jadakiss, Joell Ortiz | Monster Mondays Vol. 1 |
| "Favorite DJ" (Remix) | 2011 | DJ Green Lantern, Bun B, Daney Foxxwoodz, Game | —N/a |
| "Wet" (Remix) | 2011 | Snoop Dogg, Shawty Lo | —N/a |
| "Nymphomaniac" | 2011 | Travis Barker, Wyclef Jean | Let the Drummer Get Wicked |
| "Ballin'" (Remix) | 2011 | Young Jeezy | —N/a |
| "December" (Remix) | 2011 | Olivia | —N/a |
| "Time Is Up" | 2011 | DJ Haze, Juelz Santana, Fred the Godson | —N/a |
| "Anything Else" | 2011 | Alley Boy | The Definition of Fuck Shit 2 |
| "Warning" (Remix) | 2011 | Uncle Murda, French Montana, Jadakiss, Styles P, Vado, Cam’ron | —N/a |
| "Till I'm Gone" (Remix) | 2011 | Tinie Tempah, Wiz Khalifa, Pusha T | Happy Birthday |
| "Makeout" | 2011 | Cam'ron, Vado, Sen City | Boss of All Bosses 2.8: Road to 3.0 |
| "Here I Stand" | 2011 | John Depp | The Warm Up |
| "Forbes Musik" | 2011 | DJ Infamous, 2 Chainz | —N/a |
| "Hot (In This Bitch)" | 2011 | Gilbere Forte, Pusha T | Some Dreams Never Sleep |
| "I'm From Harlem" (Remix) | 2011 | Nym Dot, Smoke DZA | —N/a |
| "Circus Freaks" | 2011 | Wolfgang Gartner, Cam'ron | Weekend in America |
| "I Like" | 2011 | Young Swift, Young Jeezy | M.D.M.I. (Major Deal Minor Issues) |
| "Let It Fly" (Remix) | 2012 | Maino, Roscoe Dash, DJ Khaled, Ace Hood, Meek Mill, Wale | I Am Who I Am |
| "Certified" | 2012 | Maino | I Am Who I Am |
| "Champion" | 2012 | Prince Malik, Meek Mill | Life Style |
| "Billionaire" | 2012 | Prince Malik, Yung Joc | Life Style |
| "Hey Ladies" | 2012 | Prince Malik | Life Style |
| "We Own the Night" | 2012 | Sonnie Carson | FLIGHT #2012 |
| "Kansas" | 2012 | Gucci Mane | I'm Up |
| "Retrograde" (Remix) | 2012 | McKenzie Eddy | El Presidente |
| "Spike Lee" | 2012 | Fred the Godson | Gordo Frederico |
| "Freeze" | 2012 | ASAP Rocky | Lords Never Worry |
| "Can't Stop It" | 2012 | Kingpen Slim | Triple Beam Dreams |
| "Mobbin'" (Remix) | 2012 | Maino, Busta Rhymes, Gucci Mane, Yo Gotti, Trae Tha Truth | The Mafia |
| "Work" | 2012 | Bizzy Crook | P.S. I'm Sorry 2 |
| "Presidential" | 2012 | Trav, Lloyd Banks | Push |
| "Nino Brown" | 2012 | Trav | Push |
| "Put That On My Watch" | 2012 | Chubbie Baby | 36 Oz, Part 2 |
| "Put Your Fist Up" | 2012 | DJ Kay Slay, Sauce Money, Tony Yayo | Grown Man Hip-Hop |
| "She Bad" | 2012 | Sen City | Clear Smoke |
| "Piss Test" (Remix) | 2012 | A-Trak, Juicy J, Flatbush Zombies, El-P, Flosstradamus | Loosies |
| "Been On This Road" | 2012 | Mike WiLL Made It | Est. In 1989 2.5 |
| "Get Like Me" | 2013 | Metta World Peace, Deacon, Foul Monday, Challace | The Passion |
| "Both Sides" | 2013 | Juelz Santana, Lil Durk | God Will'n |
| "Dem Rarris" | 2013 | Moka Blast | Ladies Love Moka Blast |
| "Ride That 5" | 2013 | Mel Matrix | —N/a |
| "Kill Em" | 2013 | Ricky Blaze | Maestro |
| "Weight" | 2013 | Trav | —N/a |
| "6am" | 2013 | Papoose, Jadakiss | The Nacirema Dream |
| "Tippin'" | 2013 | DJ Frosty | —N/a |
| "I Wanna Know" (Remix) | 2013 | Prince Malik, Ace Hood, DJ Khaled | —N/a |
| "Money Be Calling" | 2013 | Philthy Rich | Not Enough Real Niggas Left 2 |
| "Hello Love" (Remix) | 2013 | T. Rone, Juicy J, Fat Joe, Raheem Devaughn | —N/a |
| "Show It Off" | 2013 | DJ Lead, Ai | —N/a |
| "Crispy Hunneds" | 2013 | DJ Naim, Gunplay, Maino, David Rush | I Got Now |
| "I Don't Wanna Stay" | 2013 | Estelle | Love & Happiness, Vol. 2: Waiting to Exhale |
| "C.F.W.U. (Cantfuckwithus)" | 2014 | Cam'ron, Hell Rell | 1st of the Month Vol. 2 |
| "Preach" | 2018 | Swizz Beatz | Poison |
| "Owed to Me" | 2020 | Trav, French Montana | Nothing Happens Overnight |
| "Too Late" | 2020 | French Montana | CB5 |
| "Automatico" | 2020 | C-Kan, Grupo Codiciado | Baúl |
| "Mack Truck" | 2021 | YSL Records, Young Thug | Slime Language 2 (Deluxe) |

== See also ==
- The Diplomats discography

=== ByrdGang discography ===
List of albums, with selected chart positions.
| Title | Album details | Peak chart positions | | |
| Title | Album details | US | US R&B | US Rap |
|---|---|---|---|---|
| M.O.B.: The Album (with ByrdGang) | Released: July 1, 2008; Label: ByrdGang, Asylum; Format: CD, digital download | 29 | 6 | 5 |
"—" denotes a title that did not chart, or was not released in that territory.

==== Singles ====
List of singles, showing year released and album name
| Title | Year | Album |
|---|---|---|
| "Splash" (with ByrdGang featuring Juelz Santana) | 2008 | M.O.B.: The Album |
