= The Rooftop =

The Rooftop may refer to:

- The Rooftop (album), a 2009 album by Webstar and Jim Jones
- The Rooftop (film), a 2013 Taiwanese musical film

== See also ==
- Rooftop (disambiguation)
