= El Capo (album) =

Studio album by Jim Jones
- Released: May 31, 2019
- Genre: Hip hop
- Length: 58:22
- Labels: Vamp Life; EMPIRE
- Producer: The Heatmakerz

Jim Jones chronology
Wasted Talent (2018)	El Capo (2019)	The Fraud Department (2021)

Professional ratings
Review scores
Source	Rating
Exclaim!	8/10
HipHopDX	3.9/5

El Capo is the seventh studio album by American rapper Jim Jones. It was released on May 31, 2019 via Jim Jones' Vamp Life and EMPIRE Distribution. Produced entirely by The Heatmakerz, it features guest appearances from Marc Scibilia, Cam'ron, Trav, Ball Greezy, Benny the Butcher, Conway the Machine, Curren$y, Dave East, Drama, Fabolous, Fat Joe, Fred the Godson, Guordan Banks, Jadakiss, Juelz Santana, Maino, Philthy Rich, Rain910 and Rick Ross.

The deluxe edition of the album was released on November 27, 2020 with fifteen extra songs.

== Background ==
Jones first announced the album's release date on May 28 through his instagram, and revealed it was to be produced entirely by the Heatmakerz.

== Track listing ==
- All tracks produced by the Heatmakerz.

Standard edition
No.	Title	Writer(s)	Length
1.	"Cristal Occasions"	Joseph Jones; Gregory Green; Sean Thomas	3:30
2.	"Love of the Hustle" (featuring Trav)	Jones; Green; Thomas; Travis Lashey	3:24
3.	"Make No Issues of It"	Jones	3:18
4.	"NYC" (featuring Fat Joe)	Jones; Joseph Cartagena	2:57
5.	"Good Die Young" (featuring Marc Scibilia)	Jones; Marc Scibilia	3:30
6.	"State of the Union" (featuring Rick Ross and Marc Scibilia)	Jones; Scibilia; Mbarack Achieng; Ayub Ogada; William Roberts	3:38
7.	"Pity in the Summer" (featuring Cam'ron, Fred the Godson, Marc Scibilia, and Rain910)	Jones; Cameron Giles; Fredrick Thomas; Scibilia	4:12
8.	"My Era" (featuring Maino and DramaB2R)	Jones; Jermaine Coleman; Santos Carroll	3:58
9.	"Nothing Lasts" (featuring Fabolous and Marc Scibilia)	Jones; John Jackson; Scibilia	2:38
10.	"Cocaine Dreamin'" (featuring Ball Greezy and Dave East)	Jones; Kinta Cox; David Brewster Jr.	4:30
11.	"Mama I Made It" (featuring Cam'ron)	Jones; Giles	3:51
12.	"To Whom It May Concern" (featuring Cam'ron, Guordan Banks, Benny the Butcher, and Conway the Machine)	Jones; Giles; Guordan Banks; Demond Price; Jeremie Pennick	5:07
13.	"Sports Cars" (featuring Curren$y)	Jones; Shante Franklin	3:21
14.	"Song Boxing"	Jones	1:45
15.	"Bread Right" (featuring Trav)	Jones; Jackson; Lashey; Bryan Sledge	3:52
16.	"Don't Know What They Took Him For" (featuring Jadakiss and Philthy Rich)	Jones; Jason Phillips; Phillip Beasley	3:52
Total length:			58:22

Deluxe edition
No.	Title	Writer(s)	Length
1.	"Election" (featuring Juelz Santana and Marc Scibilia)	Jones; LaRon L. James; Scibilia	3:43
2.	"Anybody" (featuring Sandra Conte)	Jones; Conte	3:07
3.	"Chasing That Feeling" (featuring Marc Scibilia)	Jones; Scibilia	3:24
4.	"MMTC" (featuring Vado and Rain910)	Jones; Teeyon I. Winfree	2:33
5.	"Father Forgive Us" (featuring Maino)	Jones; Coleman	2:28
6.	"For the Better" (featuring DramaB2R)	Jones; Carroll	3:26
7.	"Pardon My Thoughts" (featuring Dave East)	Jones; Brewster Jr.	2:46
8.	"Everything" (featuring Marc Scibilia)	Jones; Scibilia	3:04
9.	"Try Again" (featuring Conway the Machine and DramaB2R)	Jones; Price; Carroll	3:13
10.	"Been Like That" (featuring DramaB2R)	Jones; Carroll	2:54
11.	"Bad Boyz" (featuring Axel Leon, Nino Man and Fred the Godson)	Jones; Axel Leon; Louis Abney; Thomas	3:46
12.	"A Monster Made It"	Jones	3:08
13.	"Finito" (featuring Fred the Godson)	Jones; Thomas	2:43
14.	"Gospel"	Jones	2:40
15.	"I'm Alive" (featuring Marc Scibilia)	Jones; Scibilia	3:21
Total length:			1:44:00

== Charts ==
Chart (2019)	Peak position
US Billboard 200	114
