= Wasted Talent (album) =

Studio album by Jim Jones
- Released: April 13, 2018
- Genre: Hip hop
- Length: 55:38
- Labels: Vamplife; EMPIRE
- Producers: The Heatmakerz; Dougie on the Beat; 808-Ray; DJ Rellyrell; Foreign Teck; Jahlil Beats; Killa Watts; Kyle Smith; Non Stop; Rain910; Ron Oilers; SmittyBeatz

Jim Jones chronology
The Kitchen (2016)	Wasted Talent (2018)	El Capo (2019)

Wasted Talent is the sixth studio album by American rapper Jim Jones. It was released on April 13, 2018 via Vamplife and EMPIRE Distribution.

== Critical reception ==
Professional ratings
Review scores
Source	Rating
HipHopDX	3.8/5

Trent Clark of HipHopDX rated the album a 3.8 out of 5 stars, calling the album a "CPR for traditional NYC rap", also praising the body of work for its nolstagia-filled content by saying "...They don't make New York rappers like they used to and hearing Jones dominate a full-length project with accelerated lyricism is a throwback to the days of the American Diplomatic flag".

On May 14, 2018, while being interviewed on The Howard Stern Show, former Wack Pack member King Of All Blacks called the album the greatest hip-hop record of the past 15 years.

== Track listing ==
No.	Title	Producer(s)	Length
1.	"Intro Bronx Tales"		0:41
2.	"Never Did The 3Quarters"	The Heatmakerz	3:31
3.	"Dust & Powder" (featuring Jadakiss)	The Heatmakerz	3:22
4.	"Catch on Yet" (featuring Trav)	Rain910	1:56
5.	"Banging" (featuring Mozzy)	Non Stop	2:57
6.	"Gotta Play the Game" (featuring YFN Lucci)	Dougie on the Beat	3:39
7.	"Got to B Real" (featuring Alexza)	DJ RELLYRELL	4:35
8.	"Epitome"	808-Ray; SmittyBeatz	3:03
9.	"Living My Best Life" (featuring Eric Bellinger)	The Heatmakerz	2:59
10.	"Adidas" (featuring Ball Greezy)	Killa Watts	3:47
11.	"Chicken Fried Rice" (featuring Yo Gotti, 5AM, and Trav)	Ron Oilers	2:57
12.	"The Old Way" (featuring Axel Leon)		2:00
13.	"Diplomatic Immunity" (featuring Cam'ron)	The Heatmakerz	2:55
14.	"Head Off" (featuring Lil Durk)	Dougie on the Beat	2:58
15.	"Pray" (featuring Trav)	Kyle Smith	4:22
16.	"Bag Talk" (featuring Ball Greezy)	Foreign Teck	3:09
17.	"Still Dipset" (featuring Juelz Santana and Avon Carter)	Jahlil Beats	3:21
18.	"Once Upon a Time" (featuring Cam'ron)	The Heatmakerz	3:26

Sample credits

- Track 3 contains elements from "Hurry Up This Way Again" performed by The Stylistics
- Track 9 contains elements from "All the Way Around" performed by Marvin Gaye

== Charts ==
Chart (2018)	Peak position
US Billboard 200	131
US Digital Albums (Billboard)	23
US Independent Albums (Billboard)	11
