= Dunlap Exclusive =

American record producer (born 1983)

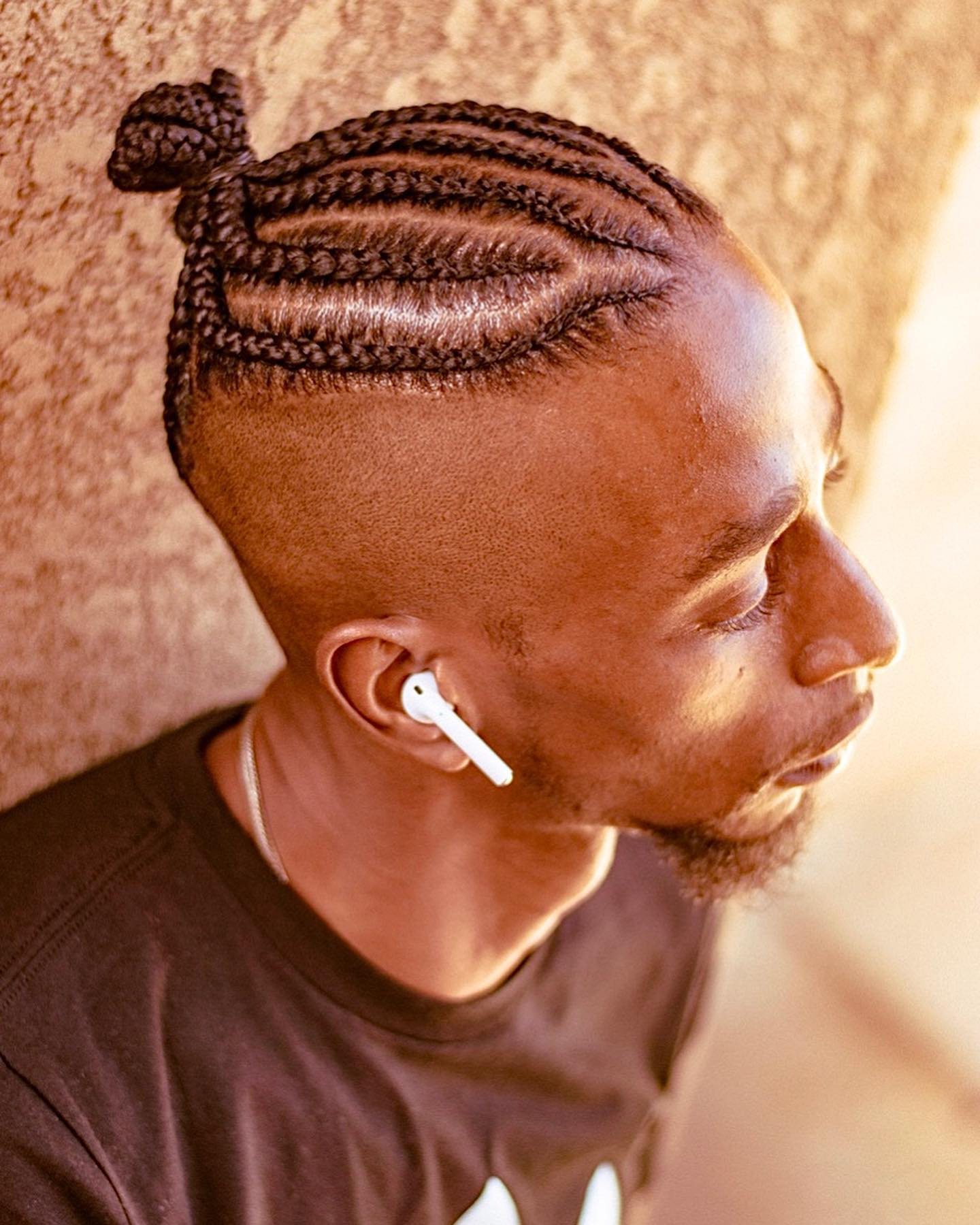

Background information
- Born: Charles Dunlap; October 23, 1983 (age 43)
- Origin: Nashville, Tennessee
- Occupation: Record producer

Charles Dunlap (conceived October 23, 1983) is better known by his stagename Dunlap Exclusive. He is a Grammy, Stellar and 3x Dove award-winning music producer from Nashville, Tennessee who has worked with artists such as 2 Chainz, Lloyd, Jim Jones, TLC (group) Trina, Rick Ross and Lecrae.

As a visionary, Dunlap realized he had outgrown his hometown and moved to Atlanta to pursue music. He began working with Gorilla Zoe at Block ENT in the Mixtape market. Later he worked with Atlanta Def Jam/DTP recording artist Playaz Circle as well as landing a placement on Tampa's Atlantic/Big Gates artist Plies on his album Goon Affiliated.

Dunlap left Atlanta to work closely with Interscope group I Square, and Dirty Money on their "Last Train To Paris" album in Los Angeles. Returning to Atlanta a little over a year later, he landed a placement on Jim Jones' album "Capo". From there he went on to working with acts such as Lecrae, TLC, Snoop Dogg and more.

Dunlap has music in the Film and Television Industry syncing in #1 TV shows such as Keeping Up With The Kardashians, Bad Girls Club, Love and Hip Hop : New York, Mythic Quest, and Basketball Wives on VH1. He has worked with Indie films placing 3 songs in the movie titled "Hey Mr.Postman" featuring Omar Gooding and Anthony Johnson. Dunlap also made a debut alongside Pop Hip hop artist DeAna Fai in her "Me & Mine" Official Music Video. He has an upcoming release featured in the hit Podcast, and Television Show "DeAna Fai presents Kings & Queens of Entertainment" as a guest speaker supporting the National Breast Cancer Foundation and the American Stroke Association.

== Discography ==
Studio albums

- I Wanna Thank Me (August 16, 2019) Snoop Dogg
- Turn Up Godz (March 1, 2019) Waka Flocka Flame ft. DJ Whoo Kid
- TLC (June 30, 2017) TLC
- Minorville ([September 10, 2013) Derek Minor
- Heroes for Sale (April 16, 2013) Andy Mineo
- Gravity (September 4, 2012) Lecrae
- Capo (April 5, 2011) Jim Jones
- Formerly Known (September 9, 2011) Andy Mineo
- Rehab: The Overdose (January 11, 2011) Lecrae
- Blacklight (May 31, 2011) Tedashii
- Goon Affiliated (June 8, 2010) Plies

== Album charts ==
Snoop Dogg

I Wanna Thank Me Album Chart (2019)	Peak position
Australian Digital Albums (ARIA)	25
Belgian Albums (Ultratop Flanders)	63
Canadian Albums (Billboard)	83
Dutch Albums (Album Top 100)	40
French Albums (SNEP)	129
Swiss Albums (Schweizer Hitparade)	23
US Billboard 200	76
US Top R&B/Hip-Hop Albums (Billboard)	41

TLC

TLC Album Chart (2017)	Peak position
Australian Digital Albums (ARIA)	25
Australian Urban Albums (ARIA)	25
Belgian Albums (Ultratop Flanders)	166
German Albums (Offizielle Top 100)	81
Greek Albums (IFPI)	42
Japanese Albums (Oricon)	62
New Zealand Heatseekers Albums (RMNZ)	7
Scottish Albums (Official Charts)	72
UK Albums (Official Charts)	40
UK Independent Albums (Official Charts)	3
UK R&B Albums (Official Charts)	1
US Billboard 200	38
US Independent Albums (Billboard)	1
US Top R&B/Hip-Hop Albums (Billboard)	20

Andy Mineo

Heroes For Sale Album Chart (2013)	Peak position
US	11
US Rap	4
US Christian	1
UK Christian	2
US Gospel	1
US Digital	6
US Independent	2

Lecrae

Gravity Album Chart (2012)	Peak position
Chart	Peak position
Billboard 200	3
Canadian Albums	24
Rap Albums	1
Christian Albums	1
Gospel Albums	1
Independent Albums	1
Digital Albums	3
New Zealand Albums Chart	16

Jim Jones

Capo Album Chart (2011)	Peak position
Chart (2011)	Peak position
US Billboard 200	20
US Top R&B/Hip-Hop Albums (Billboard)	5
US Independent Albums (Billboard)	2

Lecrae

Rehab: The Overdose Album Chart (2011)	Peak position
Chart	Position
U.S. Billboard 200	15
U.S. Billboard Christian Albums	1
U.S. Billboard Gospel Albums	1
U.S. Billboard Independent Albums	5
U.S. Billboard Rap Albums	4

Plies

Goon Affiliated Album Chart (2010)	Peak position
Chart (2010)	Peak position
US Billboard 200	5
US Top Rap Albums	1
US Top R&B/Hip Hop Albums	1

== Accolades ==
Grammy GMA Dove Award Stellar Award

Year	Award	Album
2012	Grammy	*Gravity (Best Gospel Album) Lecrae
2012	Dove	*Rehab: The Overdose (Rap, Hip Hop Gospel CD of the Year) Lecrae
2012	Stellar	*Rehab: The Overdose (Rap, Hip Hop Gospel CD of the Year) Lecrae
2014	Stellar	*Gravity (Best Gospel Album) Lecrae
2013	Dove	*Gravity (Hip Hop Album of the Year) Lecrae
2013	Dove	"Tell the World" Rap / Hip Hop Song of the Year
2013	Billboard Music Awards	*Gravity (Top Christian Album) Lecrae
