= We Own the Night =

We Own the Night may refer to:

- We Own the Night (1952 film), a 1952 Mexican drama film directed by Fernando A. Rivero
- We Own the Night (film), a 2007 American thriller film directed by James Gray
- We Own the Night (EP), a 2013 EP by Jim Jones
- "We Own the Night" (Selena Gomez & the Scene song), 2011
- "We Own the Night" (Tiësto and Wolfgang Gartner song), 2012
- "We Own the Night" (The Wanted song), 2013
- "We Own the Night", a song on Dance Gavin Dance's Instant Gratification
- "We Own the Night", a 2017 single by Hollywood Undead on the album Five
- "We Own the Night", a 2018 single by Chancellor and Moti
- Fiesta, a 2014 single by Emii, also known as "We Own the Night"

== See also ==
- "We Owned the Night", a 2011 song by Lady Antebellum
