= Crunk Muzik =

Single by Jim Jones featuring Juelz Santana and Cam'ron

from the album On My Way to Church and Diplomatic Immunity 2
- Released: November 27, 2004
- Recorded: 2004
- Studio: Santana's World
- Genre: Gangsta rap
- Length: 4:15
- Label: Diplomat; Koch
- Songwriter(s): Jim Jones
- Producer(s): The Blackout Movement

Jim Jones singles chronology
"Certified Gangstas" (2004)	"Crunk Muzik" (2004)	"Baby Girl" (2005)

Juelz Santana singles chronology
"Dipset (Santana's Town)" (2003)	"Crunk Muzik" (2004)	"Mic Check" (2005)

Cam'ron singles chronology
"Boy (I Need You)" (2003)	"Crunk Muzik" (2004)	"Girls" (2004)

The Diplomats singles chronology
"Dipset Anthem" (2003)	"Crunk Muzik" (2004)	"S.A.N.T.A.N.A." (2004)

"Crunk Muzik" is a song by rapper Jim Jones from his debut studio album On My Way to Church. It was produced by The Blackout Movement and features rappers Juelz Santana and Cam'ron. It was also featured on The Diplomats' album, Diplomatic Immunity 2.

== Music video ==
The video for the song, released in late 2004, based on the 1970s film The Warriors, features a gang of men in masks and rollerblades, wielding metal chains. It also shows minister Benjamin Chavis preaching to the gang with a group of well-dressed, young black men. Also, a scene in the video features a brash, unkempt, and heavily accented French man tapping two empty Sizzurp bottles together, yelling "Dipset, come out and play! Dipset, come out and play!" Rapper Remy Ma also makes a cameo in the video.

== Chart positions ==
Chart (2004–2005)	Peak position
U.S. Billboard Hot R&B/Hip-Hop Songs	84
