= Capo (album) =

Studio album by Jim Jones
- Released: April 5, 2011
- Recorded: 2010–11
- Genre: Hip-hop
- Length: 51:32
- Label: eOne; Splash
- Producer: Aaron LaCrate; AraabMuzik; Chink Santana; Chris "CL" Liggio; Debonair Samir; D.J. of The Innovatorz; Drumma Boy; Dunlap Exclusive; Lamont "Logic" Coleman; MarvinO BeatS; Shawn Giovanni; Triple-A; Wyclef Jean

Jim Jones chronology
The Rooftop (2009)	Capo (2011)	We Own the Night (2013)

Singles from Capo
- 1. "Blow Your Smoke" Released: October 12, 2010; 2. "Perfect Day" Released: December 7, 2010

Capo is the fifth solo studio album by American rapper Jim Jones. It was released on April 5, 2011, via eOne Music and Splash Records. Production was handled by Chink Santana, Lamont "Logic" Coleman, Aaron LaCrate, AraabMuzik, Chris "CL" Liggio, Debonair Samir, D.J. of The Innovatorz, Drumma Boy, Dunlap Exclusive, MarvinO BeatS, Shawn Giovanni, Triple-A and Wyclef Jean. It features guest appearances from Chink Santana, Sen City, Aaron LaCrate, Ashanti, Cam'ron, Lady H, Lamont "Logic" Coleman, Lloyd Banks, Mel Matrix, Prodigy, Raekwon, Rell, The Game and Wyclef Jean.

The album debuted at number 20 on the Billboard 200, number 5 on the Top R&B/Hip-Hop Albums, number 2 on the Top Rap Albums and number 6 on the Independent Albums charts, selling 21,000 first-week units in the US. The following week the album sold 8,200 copies.

It was supported with singles "Blow Your Smoke" and "Perfect Day". "Blow Your Smoke" ended up being included as one of bonus tracks for Best Buy edition of the album. "Perfect Day" made it to number 67 on the Hot R&B/Hip-Hop Songs and number 66 on the R&B/Hip-Hop Airplay charts in the US.

== Critical reception ==
Professional ratings
Aggregate scores
Source	Rating
Metacritic	72/100
Review scores
Source	Rating
AllMusic	3.5/5 stars
HipHopDX	3.5/5
RapReviews	7/10
Spin	7/10 marks

Capo was met with generally favourable reviews from music critics. At Metacritic, which assigns a normalized rating out of 100 to reviews from mainstream publications, the album received an average score of 72, based on five reviews.

AllMusic's David Jeffries found the album "scattered and scrappy, which for Jones is a comfortable landscape where oddball, sprawling, day-in-the-life numbers can sit next to stay-on-the-grind tracks, and Black Eyed Peas-parodies with no apologies required". Amanda Bassa of HipHopDX wrote: "it maintains a musical energy intense enough to fuel a good party, yet throws in just enough of a dash of introspect to remind listeners that behind Jim Jones' exotic cars, empty bottles left behind at VIP tables, penchant for the drug business, and platoon of fly females, the man still has a heart". Steve 'Flash' Juon of RapReviews wrote: "if Capo is any indication of where Jones is headed in 2011 it's the first time in a while I can say that I'm looking forward to his next album".

The New York Times called the album chaotic, but often successful in spite of itself. They called his rhymes nimble but cluttered and said he is out-rapped by almost all of his guests here, including The Game on "Carton of Milk" and Lloyd Banks on "Take a Bow". They also stated his standout tracks are the lead single, "Perfect Day" and the Wiz Khalifa-esque "Heart Attack" stating that he is so at ease, so comfortable on those tracks, that he begins to sound skillful.

== Track listing ==
No.	Title	Producer(s)	Length
1.	"Intro" (featuring Sen City and Chink Santana)	Chink Santana	3:25
2.	"Deep Blue" (featuring Chink Santana)	Lamont "Logic" Coleman	2:57
3.	"Carton of Milk" (featuring The Game)	Chink Santana	4:44
4.	"The Paper" (featuring Chink Santana)	Chink Santana	4:24
5.	"Heart Attack" (featuring Sen City)	Triple-A	3:23
6.	"Everybody Jones" (featuring Aaron LaCrate)	Aaron LaCrate; Debonair Samir	4:20
7.	"Drops Is Out" (featuring Raekwon, Mel Matrix and Sen City)	AraabMuzik	4:00
8.	"Let Me Fly" (featuring Rell)	MarvinO BeatS; Shawn Giovanni	2:18
9.	"Getting to the Money" (featuring Cam'ron and Lady H)	Dunlap Exclusive	4:05
10.	"Take a Bow" (featuring Lloyd Banks, Prodigy and Sen City)	D.J. of The Innovatorz	4:40
11.	"Perfect Day" (featuring Chink Santana and Lamont "Logic" Coleman)	Lamont "Logic" Coleman	3:12
12.	"Changing the Locks" (featuring Ashanti)	Chris "CL" Liggio	2:16
13.	"God Bless the Child" (featuring Wyclef Jean)	Wyclef Jean	3:47
14.	"Itza"	Drumma Boy	4:01
Total length:			51:32

Best Buy exclusive bonus tracks
No.	Title	Length
15.	"Like Gangsta" (featuring Snoop Dogg and Rell)
16.	"Blow Your Smoke" (featuring Rell)
17.	"This How That Life Go" (featuring Sen City, J.R. Writer and Rell)
18.	"Younger" (featuring Sen City)
19.	"Who Am I" (featuring Sen City and Mel Matrix)

Target exclusive bonus tracks
No.	Title	Producer(s)	Length
15.	"Baggage Claim" (featuring Sen City)	Drew Money	4:14
16.	"Salute" (featuring Cam'ron and Juelz Santana)	AraabMuzik	3:32
17.	"Hockey Bag" (featuring Cam'ron and Juelz Santana)	Lex Luger	4:04
18.	"Dope Boi" (featuring Mel Matrix)		3:43
19.	"Bussa Move" (featuring Shoota, Hard Luck and Mel Matrix)	Chinky P.	4:22

== Charts ==
=== Weekly charts ===
Chart (2011)	Peak position
US Billboard 200	20
US Top R&B/Hip-Hop Albums (Billboard)	5
US Top Rap Albums (Billboard)	2
US Independent Albums (Billboard)	6

=== Year-end charts ===
Chart (2011)	Position
US Top R&B/Hip-Hop Albums (Billboard)	92
