= Rooftop (disambiguation) =

Rooftop primarily refers to:

- The top of a roof
- In particular, the top of a flat roof

Rooftop or Rooftops may also refer to:

== Film and TV ==
- Rooftops (film), 1989 American film, or the title song
- The Rooftops (film), 2013 Algerian film directed by Merzak Allouache
- The Rooftop (film) (天台 Tiāntái), 2013 Taiwanese musical film

== Music ==
- Rooftop (album), by Ulrik Munther
- Rooftops, EP by Fellowship Creative
- The Rooftop (album), DJ Webstar
- "Rooftop" (song), by Swedish singer Zara Larsson
- "Rooftop", a song by German singer Nico Santos
- "Rooftops (A Liberation Broadcast)", song by Lostprophets
- "Rooftops", song by Danny Elfman from the Cirque du Soleil production Iris
- "Rooftops", a song by Kris Allen from the 2012 album Thank You Camellia
- "Rooftops", a song by Wiz Khalifa from the album Rolling Papers

== See also ==
- Roof (disambiguation)
