= Dipset Anthem =

2003 single by The Diplomats

Single by The Diplomats featuring Juelz Santana and Cam'ron

from the album Diplomatic Immunity
- B-side: "What's Really Good"
- Released: July 22, 2003
- Recorded: 2003
- Genre: East Coast hip hop; gangsta rap
- Length: 4:10
- Label: Island Def Jam; Diplomat; Roc-A-Fella
- Songwriters: LaRon Louis James; Cameron Giles; Kevin Anthony Jackson; Sam Dees
- Producer: The Heatmakerz

The Diplomats featuring Juelz Santana and Cam'ron singles chronology
"Built This City" (2003)	"Dipset Anthem" (2003)	"S.A.N.T.A.N.A." (2004)

Music video
- "Dipset Anthem" on YouTube

"Dipset Anthem" is a song by Harlem rap crew The Diplomats. It features rapping from Juelz Santana and Cam'ron. Originally released with the title "Gangsta Music" on the Purple City Matrix Vol. 3 mixtape in 2003, the song was released as a single for the album Diplomatic Immunity that released in March that year.

The song reached #64 on the U.S. Billboard Hot R&B/Hip-Hop Songs chart. The song is considered a cult classic among Dipset (the nickname for The Diplomats) fans and is one of their most recognizable tracks.

== Background and development ==
According to Cam'ron, Cam and his crew used to motivate an otherwise uninterested Juelz into writing rap songs such as this one. Cam'ron stated the following in an interview: "We used to have to lock Juelz in the house straight up and down when he was 15, 16 ... All them [Juelz] songs that you hear, the bangers, was forced. 'Yo, write this song, my n****, write this song' ... All them hits: "Gangsta Music" [Dipset Anthem], "Santana's Town," all the hot s***—"Hey Ma"—was when we about to walk out to the club ... 'You're not coming out until you finish the f***ing song. We'll bring a hoe back, and if you finished the 16, we'll let you have her.'"

== Composition and lyrics ==
"Dipset Anthem" is in the key of B minor at 84 BPM (beats per minute). The song has one sample for the instrumental and two interpolations in the verses. The beat samples the first 7 seconds of a cover of the Sam Dees song "One In A Million" by reggae singer Sanchez (singer), establishing the song's tempo and key signature; production duo The Heatmakerz modified the track by chopping the sample, adding sound effects and drums from the Akai MPC-2000XL drum machine. The first verse interpolates a line from the Biggie Smalls song "N****s Bleed," and the second verse directly quotes a line from the Tupac song "Death Around the Corner."

== Music video ==
The music video for Dipset Anthem was directed by Jimmy Jones and filmed in Harlem, Manhattan, New York City, New York. The video is a split video, with the first half containing Dipset Anthem and the other half containing the video for I Really Mean It. J.R. Writer, Shiest Bubz, 40 Cal., Duke Da God, Chubbie Baby, Juelz Santana's brother Jermaine "Twin" James and nephew Young Ja, Kareem "Biggs" Burke, and Damon Dash all make cameo appearances in the video.

== Charts ==
Chart (2003)	Peak Position
U.S. Billboard Hot R&B/Hip-Hop Songs	64
