= The Roof =

The Roof may refer to:

- "The Roof (Back in Time)", a song by Mariah Carey
- The Roof (1956 film), an Italian film directed by Vittorio De Sica
- The Roof (1933 film), a British film

== See also ==
- Roof (disambiguation)
