= Roof (disambiguation) =

A roof is the cover at the top of a building.

Roof may also refer to:

== People ==
- Babiche Roof (born 1993), Dutch footballer
- Dylann Roof (born 1994), American perpetrator of a 2015 mass shooting
- Gene Roof (born 1958), American baseball outfielder and manager
- Michael Roof (1976–2009), American actor and comedian
- Phil Roof (born 1941), American baseball catcher, coach, and manager
- Ted Roof (born 1963), American football player and coach

== Other uses ==
- Roof (rock formation), a rock overhang that reach, or nearly reach, the horizontal
- Roof (Chinese constellation), one of the 28 mansions of the Chinese constellations
- Roof (category theory), a generalization of the notion of relation between two objects of a category
- "Roof" (Beavis and Butt-Head), a 2022 television episode
- Automobile roof, the top covering of a vehicle
- "Roof", a song by DaBaby from Back on My Baby Jesus Sh!t Again (2021)

== See also ==
- Kemar Roofe (born 1993), English footballer
- The Roof (disambiguation)
- Rooftop (disambiguation)
