= Blakroc =

Studio album by the Black Keys
- Released: November 24, 2009
- Recorded: 2009 in Brooklyn, New York
- Genres: Rap rock; alternative hip hop; blues rock
- Length: 37:55 (physical); 31:27 (digital)
- Labels: BlakRoc; Co-Op; V2; Nonesuch/Elektra (reissue)
- Producers: Dan Auerbach; Patrick Carney; Joel Hamilton

The Black Keys chronology
Attack & Release (2008)	Blakroc (2009)	Brothers (2010)

Singles from Blakroc
- 1. "Ain't Nothing Like You (Hoochie Coo)" Released: September 14, 2009

Blakroc (stylized as BlakRoc) is a studio album produced by Damon Dash, co-founder of the Roc-A-Fella Records label, and American rock band The Black Keys, which provides music and vocals. The album features several hip-hop and R&B acts, namely Mos Def, Nicole Wray, Pharoahe Monch, Ludacris, Billy Danze of M.O.P., Q-Tip of A Tribe Called Quest, Jim Jones, and NOE of ByrdGang, as well as Raekwon, RZA, and Ol' Dirty Bastard of Wu-Tang Clan.

== Recording and production ==
After Damon Dash, co-founder and former co-owner of Roc-A-Fella Records, began listening to Ohio-based rock duo the Black Keys (which he says quickly became his favorite band), he reached out to the musicians to meet in person. Dash suggested they enter the studio with his friend and associate, New York City-based rapper Jim Jones, with whom Dash had recently partnered to form Splash Records at the time.

While recording with co-producer and engineer Joel Hamilton at Studio G, Brooklyn rapper Mos Def interrupted the session and ended up recording with them as well. With new artists being called in to work on the album, it was completed after eleven weeks of recording. Included in the project are vocals from deceased rapper and former Roc-A-Fella Records artist Ol' Dirty Bastard—tapes that were signed over to his brief Roc4Life venture with Def Jam, with the intention of an eventual album release. In order to release Blakroc, Dash founded an independent record label in conjunction with the band.

== Release and promotion ==
Damon Dash, co-founder of the project has endorsed BlakRoc Camaros, limited edition Chevrolet Camaro automobiles to promote the album and brand. The Black Keys have stated they did not take part in the promotion.

== Reception ==
Professional ratings
Aggregate scores
Source	Rating
Metacritic	72/100
Review scores
Source	Rating
BBC	(favorable)
Clash	9/10 stars
NME	(7/10)
The Observer	4/5 stars
Pitchfork Media	(6.7/10)
Slant Magazine	4/5 stars
Spin	(5/10)
The Seattle Times	(favorable)
The Washington Post	(favorable)

The album was generally received well by critics. The album reached Number 1 and Number 7 on the US Billboard Heatseakers chart and US Billboard Top Rap Albums respectively. Nick Neyland of BBC music stated in his review "this is a surprisingly compelling and welcome rejoining of the rap and rock worlds that successfully captures the off-the-cuff nature of the recording sessions."

== Blakroc 2 ==
In early September 2011, a trailer surfaced for Blakroc 2. In an interview with Atlanta radio station 92.9 Dave FM later that month, Black Keys drummer Patrick Carney said, "Blakroc 2 is not coming out soon... there are no plans for that." Carney said that the trailer is actually an unauthorized video that was pieced together around 2009. They recorded "about eight songs" at the time, but the album was never completed. A publicist has confirmed that there is no release date set for Blakroc 2. The trailer was posted on the YouTube channel of Damon Dash's DD172 media collective.

== Track listing ==
No.	Title	Writer(s)	Length
1.	"Coochie" (featuring Ludacris and Ol' Dirty Bastard)	Dan Auerbach; Patrick Carney; Ludacris; Ol' Dirty Bastard	4:08
2.	"On the Vista" (featuring Mos Def)	Auerbach; Carney; Mos Def	2:39
3.	"Hard Times" (featuring NOE)	Auerbach; Carney; NOE	2:38
4.	"Dollaz & Sense" (featuring RZA and Pharoahe Monch)	Auerbach; Carney; Pharoahe Monch; RZA	3:47
5.	"Why Can't I Forget Him" (featuring Nicole Wray)	Auerbach; Carney	4:16
6.	"Stay Off the Fuckin' Flowers" (featuring Raekwon)	Auerbach; Carney; Raekwon	2:31
7.	"Ain't Nothing Like You (Hoochie Coo)" (featuring Mos Def and Jim Jones)	Auerbach; Carney; Jim Jones; Mos Def	3:23
8.	"Hope You're Happy" (featuring Billy Danze, Q-Tip, and Nicole Wray)	Auerbach; Billy Danze; Q-Tip; Nicole Wray	2:11
9.	"Tellin' Me Things" (featuring RZA)	Auerbach; RZA	2:39
10.	"What You Do to Me" (featuring Billy Danze, Jim Jones, and Nicole Wray)	Billy Danze; Jones; Wray	5:14
11.	"Done Did It" (featuring Nicole Wray and NOE)	Auerbach; Carney; NOE	3:29

Note

- "Coochie" does not appear on versions of the album released through several digital providers.
- On the physical version of the album, "Done Did It" runs to 4:38 and includes studio chatter at the end following a short period of silence

== Personnel ==
The Black Keys

- Dan Auerbach – guitar, production
- Patrick Carney – drums, percussion, production

Technical

- Joel Hamilton – production, engineering, recording (all tracks), mixing (tracks 2, 8, 9, 11)
- Adam Ayan – mastering
- Tchad Blake – mixing (tracks 1, 3–5, 7)
- Clay Holley – mixing (tracks 6, 10)

== Chart positions ==
Chart (2009)	Peak position
Australian Albums (ARIA)	95
US Billboard 200	110
US Billboard Top R&B/Hip-Hop Albums	21
US Billboard Top Rap Albums	7
US Billboard Top Heatseekers	1
