= On My Way to Church =

Studio album by Jim Jones
- Released: August 24, 2004
- Recorded: 2003–04
- Genre: Hip hop
- Length: 70:02
- Labels: Diplomats; Koch
- Producers: Bang!, Boola, DJ S&S, Firemen, Chad Hamilton, Heatmakerz, Jim Jones, Ryan Press, Shootie, T & J Sidekicks, Music Mystro, Skitzo

Jim Jones chronology
On My Way to Church (2004)	Harlem: Diary of a Summer (2005)

Singles from On My Way to Church
- 1. "Certified Gangstas" Released: July 13, 2004; 2. "Crunk Muzik" Released: November 27, 2004

On My Way to Church is the debut studio album by American rapper Jim Jones. The album was released on August 24, 2004, through Diplomat Records and Koch Records. The production on the album was handled by various producers including Chad Hamilton, Boola, Ryan Press, Heatmakerz and Jones himself among others. The album also features guest appearances by T.I., Cam'ron, Bun B, Juelz Santana and more.

On My Way to Church was supported by two singles: "Certified Gangstas" and "Crunk Muzik". The album received generally mixed reviews from music critics and received moderate commercial success. The album debuted at number 18 on the Billboard 200, with 44,000 copies sold in the first week released.

== Singles ==
On My Way to Church was supported by two singles. The first single, "Certified Gangstas", was released on July 13, 2004. The single features guest appearances by Cam'ron and Jay Bezel. The single received low commercial success, peaking at number 80 on the US Hot R&B/Hip-Hop Songs chart. The second single, "Crunk Muzik", was released on November 27, 2004. The single features guest appearances by Cam'ron and Juelz Santana. It peaked at number 84 on the US Hot R&B/Hip-Hop Songs chart.

== Critical reception ==
Professional ratings
Review scores
Source	Rating
AllMusic	2.5/5 stars
HipHopDX	3.5/5 stars
RapReviews	6/10 stars

On My Way to Church received generally mixed reviews from music critics. K.B. Tindal of HipHopDX praised the effort from Jones claiming that it is his time to reign after playing the "capo" position to fellow Diplomats rapper Cam'ron. Tindal says this album is Jones effort to prove he can hold his own as a rapper. He is confident in Jones's rap ability, saying that "Jim has released an album that follows all the diplomatic traditions of Hip Hop yet, he crosses borders and boundaries that are sure to bring him more street love that he already has". Tindal described the album as "simply Jim Jones finally expressing his thoughts without restriction". He also praised his versatility calling this a "bi-coastal sounding disc". Ultimately Tindal gave the album a 3.5 out of 5 rating.

== Commercial performance ==
On My Way to Church debuted at number 18 on the US Billboard 200 chart, selling 44,000 copies in its first week. This became Jones' first US top-twenty debut on the chart. The album also peaked at number four on the US Top R&B/Hip-Hop Albums chart, becoming his first top-ten album. As of August 2005, the album has sold 200,000 copies in the United States.

== Track listing ==
No.	Title	Producer(s)	Length
1.	"On My Way to Church (Intro)"	Hand 2 Hand Entertainment	1:40
2.	"Capo Status (1st Take)"	Boola	1:01
3.	"Only One Way Up" (featuring Cam'ron and Juelz Santana)	Versatile Productions	4:06
4.	"This Is Jim Jones" (featuring Cam'ron)	The Heatmakerz	3:57
5.	"Let's Ride" (featuring J.R. Writer)	Jimmy Jones; Shottie	4:05
6.	"Certified Gangstas" (featuring Cam'ron and Bezel)	Bang	4:03
7.	"Jamaican Joint" (featuring Cam'ron and Juelz Santana)	The Heatmakerz	4:09
8.	"End of the Road" (featuring Bun B and T.I.)	The Heatmakerz	4:16
9.	"Shotgun Fire"	Jimmy Jones; Music Mystro	3:57
10.	"Capo Status (2nd Take)"	Boola	1:16
11.	"Lovely Daze / Memory Lane"	Chad Hamilton	5:43
12.	"Spanish Fly" (featuring Chico De Barge)	Blackout Muzik	3:29
13.	"Livin Life as a Ridah" (featuring Denise Weeks)	Blackout Muzik	3:47
14.	"Twin Towers" (featuring Bizzy Bone)	Chad Hamilton	3:31
15.	"When Thugs Die"	T&J Sidekicks	3:28
16.	"This Is Gangsta" (featuring Bezel and Juelz Santana)	Shottie	4:52
17.	"Crunk Muzik" (featuring Cam'ron and Juelz Santana)	Blackout Muzik	4:15
18.	"Bend n Stretch"	Blackout Muzik	3:42
19.	"Talking to the World"	DJ S&S	3:41
20.	"Capo Status Final Take"	Boola	1:33
21.	"On My Way to Church (Outro)" (featuring Benjamin Chavis Muhammad)	Hand 2 Hand Entertainment	1:31

== Charts ==
=== Weekly charts ===
Chart (2004)	Peak position
US Billboard 200	18
US Top R&B/Hip-Hop Albums (Billboard)	4

=== Year-end charts ===
Chart (2004)	Position
US Top R&B/Hip-Hop Albums (Billboard)	94
