= NOE (rapper) =

American rapper

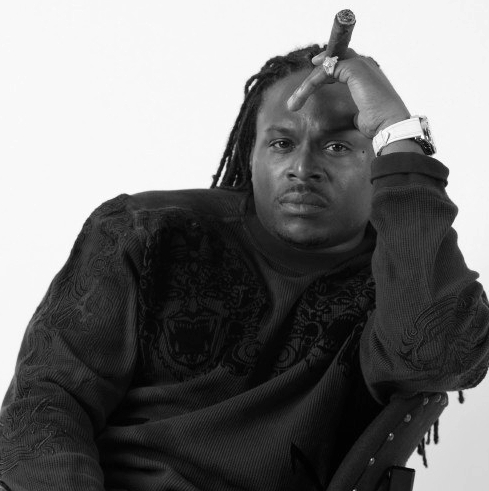

Background information
- Born: Duane Stacy Bridgeford
- Origin: Baltimore, Maryland, U.S.
- Genres: Hip hop
- Occupations: Rapper, songwriter
- Years active: 2005-Present
- Labels: Merlot Heights, Asylum Records, ByrdGang Records

Duane Stacy Bridgeford, better known by his stage name NOE, is an American hip hop recording artist from Baltimore, Maryland. He is best known for his affiliation with Jim Jones and his involvement in East Coast hip hop group ByrdGang. He was featured on most of the songs for M.O.B.: The Album (2008) and was a prominent writer and featured artist on Jim Jones' Pray IV Reign (2009). His song, “Done Did It,” is licensed to ABC’s number one crime drama Detroit 1-8-7 for the first episode, which was watched by 13 million viewers.

== Biography ==
=== 2005: Early life and career beginnings ===
Bridgeford was born and raised in the inner city of Baltimore, Maryland. NOE's early adult years were engulfed in the violence and dilapidated neighborhoods that continue to blanket Baltimore City. During a phone interview while at a New York recording studio, Bridgeford wasn't very candid about growing up in East Baltimore. He opts not to mention the name of his high school, and sums up his criminal history as "two arrests, one was for drugs, one was for a gun violation, all in all I did about three years." He does mention that he regrets not being closer to his family, and looks at that rift as the reason he decided to express himself through poetry. In 2002 Bridgeford relocated from Baltimore to New York City in search of a record deal.

After being rejected by A&R men throughout the business for sounding like Jay-Z, Bridgeford's business partner Nicole Chaplin, who worked with Dipset President Jim Jones while he was still signed to Jay-Z's Roc-A-Fella label, introduced the two. Chaplin also introduced Bridgeford to Conrad Dimanche, senior vice president at Bad Boy Records, who was impressed with his work but not interested in signing a new act: "[Dimanche] just told me to start writing, and it just so happened that Diddy was working on the Danity Kane project," Bridgeford says. "Writing is where the money is at. There's less scrutiny. I don't have to worry about sounding like anybody or whatever." He went on to write Diddy's lyrics for Danity Kane's debut single "Show Stopper". Working with Diddy has also given him a chance to work side by side with Jay-Z. "It was a real professional situation," Bridgeford says. "He was doing the hook on a song that ended up not being on the Danity Kane album, and I had to come through to write the lyrics."

=== 2006-2009: ByrdGang ===
In 2006 Jones launched ByrdGang Records and formed hip hop collective ByrdGang along with Mel Matrix, NOE, Freekey Zeekey and Chink Santana. Jones' first featured Bridgeford on his 2008 mixtape Harlem's American Gangster. Asylum Records began distributing ByrdGang Records in 2008 where the label released their first album under Asylum & ByrdGang titled M.O.B.: The Album. NOE is featured on 13 tracks of the 18 tracks. NOE's lyrics and song writing abilities are also displayed on over 90 percent of the Byrdgang Album. The album debuts at # 5 on the Billboard Rap Charts. M.O.B.: The Album earns a rating of XL (equivalent to 4 out of 5 stars) based on the XXL Magazine rating system. Pray_IV_Reign by Jim Jones', also features NOE. It was released March 24, 2009. The album peaked at #9 on the Billboard 200 chart. On July 8, Jones released a promotional single entitled "The Good Stuff" featuring NOE.

2008 featured Bridgeford perform a freestyle on BET's Rap City "Da Basement". VIBE Magazine highlights the song by NOE called "Headlights". NOE is featured in the 11th Anniversary XXL Magazine Issue representing Baltimore, MD in the Show & Prove section. The FADER Magazine music review featured the single "Headlights". NOE is featured in the 11th Anniversary XXL Magazine Issue representing Baltimore, MD in the Show & Prove section. 2008 The Byrdgang/ShadyVille DJ's "NOE MORE ?'S" Mixtape, a full length mixtape featuring NOE, is released. It reportedly rakes in a whopping 40,000 listens in one day according to DatPiff.com within hours of its release. "NOE MORE ?'s" features songs such as "Every Night" produced by Afro Keys, "Lime Light" produced by Uncle Ruck and "Headlights" produced by Jay Funk.

In 2009 Bridgeford was ultimately a writer and featured guest on Jim Jones' Pray IV Reign. He was also featured on the critically acclaimed Dame Dash and the Black Keys compilation album Blakroc. His composition "Done Did It" featuring Nicole Wray is licensed to number one TV shows such as CSI, and Ellen.

=== 2010-present: NOE Remorse ===
"Done Did It" is licensed to ABC's number one crime drama "Detroit 187" for the first episode. The first episode was seen in over 13 million homes. Switzerland recording artist Sempe, featured NOE in the song and video for his track entitled, “Angels” with Paula Bright on the chorus. NOE releases his first single called "We City Boyz" from the upcoming summer album release entitled NOE Remorse with his marketing campaign called NOE the Brand via digital release.

== Discography ==
Year	Title	Notes
2007	NOEtorious Kid	Mixtape
2008	Deal Or NOE Deal	Mixtape
2008	M.O.B.: The Album	Studio Album w/ ByrdGang
2009	Ain't NOE Frontin'	Mixtape
2009	Gone Til NOEvember	Mixtape
2009	NOEstradamus	Mixtape
2009	NOE Turning Back	Mixtape
2009	NOE The Name	Mixtape
2010	NOE Holds Barred	Mixtape
2011	NOE Remorse	Studio album

== Filmography ==
Year	Title	Role	Notes
2009	Red Apples Falling	Himself	Feature film
2017	In The Wood	Himself	Short Film
