= Certified Gangstas =

Single by Jim Jones featuring Cam'ron and Jay Bezel

from the album On My Way to Church
- Released: July 13, 2004
- Recorded: 2003
- Genre: Gangsta rap; G-funk
- Length: 4:03
- Label: Koch
- Songwriters: Joseph Guillermo Jones; Cameron Giles; P. Corley III; Duane Holmes
- Producer: Duane Holmes

Jim Jones singles chronology
"Certified Gangstas" (2004)	"Crunk Muzik" (2004)

Cam'ron singles chronology
"Get 'Em Girls" (2004)	"Certified Gangstas" (2004)	"Down and Out" (2005)

"Certified Gangstas" is a song by American hip hop recording artist Jim Jones, released as his solo debut single as well as the lead single from his debut solo studio album On My Way to Church. The song features vocals from Jay Bezel and Jones’ fellow Dipset cohort Cam'ron. The song reached number 80 on the Hot R&B/Hip-Hop Songs in the United States. Jones has said the song is an ode to West Coast hip hop legend Eazy-E's 1987 single, "Boyz-n-the-Hood", which the song samples.

== Music video ==
The music video for the song was released in 2004 and is for the remix. It was directed by Jones and includes a cameo appearance by Eazy-E’s son Lil Eazy-E. The video parodies the opening scene of the 1993 film, Menace II Society, where O-Dog is confronted by the Asian owners of a convenience store.

== Remix ==
The song was remixed removing Jay Bezel and replacing him with a verse from The Game, as well as Lil Flip. The remix was used for the music video, though Lil Flip's verse is not included.

== Sequel ==
A sequel to "Certified Gangstas" was released in January 2010 entitled "Certified Gangstas Pt. 2". It features Game, Mel Matrix (of Diplomat) and Sen City.

== Chart positions ==
Chart (2004)	Peak position
U.S. Billboard Hot R&B/Hip-Hop Songs	80

== Release history ==
Region	Date	Format(s)	Label(s)	Ref.
United States	July 19, 2004	Urban contemporary radio	Koch	
