= Dancin on Me =

Single by Webstar & Jim Jones featuring Juelz Santana

from the album The Rooftop
- Released: April 28, 2009
- Genre: East Coast hip hop
- Length: 3:38
- Label: E1/Scrilla Hill/Splash
- Songwriters: Joseph Jones, Troy Ryan, LaRon James, Remo Green
- Producers: Remo Green, Webstar

Jim Jones singles chronology
"Blow the Bank" (2009)	"Dancin on Me" (2009)	"I Love Her" (2009)

Webstar singles chronology
"Uptown Harlem" (2008)	"Dancin on Me" (2009)	"She Can Get It" (2009)

Juelz Santana singles chronology
"Rockin' That Thang (Remix)" (2008)	"Dancin on Me" (2009)	"Mixin' Up the Medicine" (2009)

"Dancin on Me" is a song by American rappers Jim Jones and Webstar, from their first collaborative effort The Rooftop (2009). The song, released as the lead single from the album, was produced by Remo Green and Webstar. The song features a guest verse from Jones' Dipset cohort Juelz Santana.

== Music video ==
The music video was directed by Jim Jones, Kevin James Custer and James Franck. It premiered as the "New Joint of the Day" on 106 & Park, on June 11, 2009. In the video, Webstar throws a house party while Jones goes to a photo shoot. At the photo shoot there is a parody of the "Single Ladies (Put a Ring on It)" music video performed by Beyoncé. The video was listed at number #94 on BET's notarized top 100 videos.

== Charts ==
Chart (2008)	Peak Position
U.S. Billboard Bubbling Under Hot 100 Singles	4
U.S. Billboard Hot R&B/Hip-Hop Songs	48
U.S. Billboard Hot Rap Tracks	19
