= M.O.B.: The Album =

Studio album by Jim Jones and ByrdGang
- Released: June 17, 2008
- Recorded: 2007–08
- Studio: Quad Recording Studios (New York, NY); Chung King Studios (New York, NY)
- Genre: Hip-hop
- Label: ByrdGang; Asylum
- Producer: Jim Jones; AblazeDaArchitek; Chad Beat; Chink Santana; DJ Green Lantern; Joe Black; Majik; M. Rell; Noyz; Oneya; Young Los

Jim Jones chronology
Hustler's P.O.M.E. (Product of My Environment) (2006)	M.O.B.: The Album (2008)	Pray IV Reign (2009)

Singles from M.O.B.: The Album
- 1. "Splash" Released: May 23, 2008

Professional ratings
Review scores
Source	Rating
AllMusic	3.5/5 stars
PopMatters	3/10
RapReviews	6/10
UGO Networks	C
XXL	4/5 (XL)

M.O.B.: The Album is the only album by the American hip-hop collective ByrdGang. It was released through Jim Jones' ByrdGang Records and Asylum Records digitally on June 17, 2008, and the physical copies were in stores on July 1, 2008. Production was handled by Chink Santana, Joe Black, Noyz, AblazeDaArchitek, Chad Beats, DJ Green Lantern, Majik, M. Rell, Oneya and Young Los, with Black Flag Boo Boo, Dorielle and Nardo serving as co-producers. It features contributions from Jim Jones, NOE, Mel Matrix, Chink Santana, Sandman, Juelz Santana, Sen City, Stack Bundles, Hell Rell and Oshy. The album peaked at number 29 on the Billboard 200, number 6 on the Top R&B/Hip-Hop Albums and number 5 on the Top Rap Albums.

The album's first single was "Splash" performed by Jim Jones, Juelz Santana, NOE and Chink Santana.

== Track listing ==
No.	Title	Writer(s)	Producer(s)	Length
1.	"I'm the Man" (Jim Jones, NOE and Mel Matrix)	J. Jones; D. Bridgeford; J. Wharton; K. Griffen	Joe Black; Noyz	3:46
2.	"Mobbin'" (NOE, Mel Matrix and Sandman featuring Juelz Santana)	D. Bridgeford; J. Jones; L. James; J. D'agostino	DJ Green Lantern	4:01
3.	"Only 17" (Jim Jones and Mel Matrix featuring Stack Bundles)	J. Jones; R. Elliot; J. Jones; A. Parker	Chink Santana	4:26
4.	"Blasphemy" (Jim Jones and Mel Matrix featuring Stack Bundles and Sen City)	J. Jones; R. Elliot; J. Jones; S. Lockwood; J. Wharton; K. Griffen	Joe Black; Noyz	4:53
5.	"Money Right" (Jim Jones and NOE featuring Sen City)	J. Jones; D. Bridgeford; S. Lockwood; Q. Johnson	Majik	4:50
6.	"Throwin' BG's" (NOE, Sandman and Chink Santana)	D. Bridgeford; G. Daquin; A. Parker; A. Jackson	AblazeDaArchitek	4:18
7.	"She So Gangsta/Freakin You" (Jim Jones, Chink Santana and NOE featuring Oshy)	A. Parker; J. Jones; D. Bridgeford; T. Byrd; C. Lecky	Chink Santana; Dorielle (co.)	10:58
8.	"Splash" (Jim Jones, NOE and Chink Santana featuring Juelz Santana)	J. Jones; L. James; D. Bridgeford; A. Parker	Chink Santana	4:23
9.	"Hustle" (Jim Jones and NOE)	D. Bridgeford; J. Jones; E. Morrell	M. Rell	3:40
10.	"Oopsy Daisy" (Jim Jones, NOE and Mel Matrix)	J. Jones; D. Bridgeford; J. Jones; A. Parker	Chink Santana; Black Flag Boo Boo (co.)	5:40
11.	"Heartbeat" (Jim Jones and NOE featuring Hell Rell)	J. Jones; D. Bridgeford; D. Mohammed; O. Ulepić	Oneya	3:56
12.	"ByrdGang Money" (Jim Jones, Mel Matrix and NOE)	J. Jones; D. Bridgeford; J. Jones; C. Burnette; M. Clervoix	Chad Beatz	4:31
13.	"Gizzang" (Jim Jones and Chink Santana)	J. Jones; A. Parker	Chink Santana	6:27
14.	"We Flying" (Jim Jones, Mel Matrix and NOE)	J. Jones; D. Bridgeford; J. Jones; C. Taylor III	Young Los	5:06
15.	"So Cold" (Jim Jones, Chink Santana and Sandman)	A. Parker; J. Jones; G. Daquin	Chink Santana; Nardo (co.)	4:24

iTunes bonus tracks
No.	Title	Length
16.	"Religion" (Jim Jones)	4:43
17.	"Pipe Smoke" (Jim Jones and NOE featuring Riz)	5:07
18.	"Keep Watching" (Jim Jones and NOE featuring Riz)	4:26

Leftover tracks

- "Life's Like a Movie" (Jim Jones and Mel Matrix featuring Max B and Stack Bundles)
- "Make a Chick Go" (performed by Max B)

== Personnel ==
- Joseph "Jimmy" Jones – vocals (tracks: 1, 3–5, 7–18), executive producer
- Duane "NOE" Bridgeford – vocals (tracks: 1, 2, 5–12, 14, 17, 18)
- Jamel "Mel Matrix" Jones – vocals (tracks: 1–4, 10, 12, 14)
- Guy Connel "Sandman" DaQuin Jr. – vocals (tracks: 2, 6, 15)
- LaRon "Juelz Santana" James – vocals (tracks: 2, 8)
- Rayquon "Stack Bundles" Elliott – vocals (tracks: 3, 4)
- Seneca "Sen City" Lockwood – vocals (tracks: 4, 5)
- Andre "Chink Santana" Parker – vocals (tracks: 6–8, 13, 15), producer (tracks: 3, 7, 8, 10, 13, 15)
- Thomas "Oshy" Byrd – vocals (track 7)
- Chris "Luck" Lecky – additional vocals (track 7), A&R
- Rowena – additional vocals (track 7)
- Durell "Hell Rell" Mohammed – vocals (track 11)
- Joe "Joe Black" Wharton – producer (tracks: 1, 4)
- K. "Noyz" Griffen – producer (tracks: 1, 4)
- James "DJ Green Lantern" D'Agostino – producer (track 2)
- Quinton "Majik" Johnson – producer (track 5)
- Antwan "AblazeDaArchitek" Jackson – producer (track 6)
- Eduardo "M. Rell" Morrell III – producer (track 9)
- Vanja Oneya Ulepić – producer (track 11)
- Chad Dexter "Chad Beat" Burnette – producer (track 12)
- Carlos "Young Los" Taylor III – producer (track 14)
- Dorielle – co-producer (track 7)
- Black Flag Boo Boo – co-producer (track 10)
- Nardo – co-producer (track 15)
- Eric Jensen – recording (tracks: 1, 2, 4, 5, 6, 9–15), mixing (tracks: 1–7, 9–12, 14, 15)
- Eric "Ibo" Butler – recording (tracks: 3, 7, 8, 13), mixing (tracks: 3, 7, 8, 12, 13)
- Narima Miller – recording and mixing assistant (tracks: 1–7, 9–12, 14, 15)
- Michael Makowski – recording and mixing assistant (tracks: 8, 13)
- Will Quinnell – mastering
- Cey Adams – art direction, design
- Gasper Chiaramonte – art direction, design
- Crawford Morgan – photography
- Daniel Garriga – additional photography
- Yandielle "Yandi" Smith – management
- Pamela Simon – packaging management
- Theo Sedlmayr – legal
- Kimberly Mason – marketing
- Riz – vocals (tracks: 17, 18)

== Charts ==
Chart (2008)	Peak position
US Billboard 200	29
US Top R&B/Hip-Hop Albums (Billboard)	6
US Top Rap Albums (Billboard)	5
