= Perfect Day (Jim Jones song) =

Single by Jim Jones featuring Chink Santana and Lamont "LOGiC" Coleman

from the album Capo
- Released: December 7, 2010
- Genre: Pop-rap
- Length: 3:12
- Label: E1; Splash
- Songwriters: Joseph Jones; Andre Parker; Lamont Coleman
- Producer: Lamont "LOGiC" Coleman

Jim Jones singles chronology
"She Can Get It" (2009)	"Perfect Day" (2010)	"We Keep It Rockin" (2011)

Music video
- "Perfect Day" on YouTube

"Perfect Day" is a song by American rapper Jim Jones, released by Entertainment One Music and Splash Records on December 10, 2010 as the lead single from his fifth studio album, Capo (2011). It features guest appearances from American record producers Chink Santana and Lamont "LOGiC" Coleman, the latter of whom also produced the song.

"Perfect Day" experiments with pop rap sensibilities and features Jones singing, a notable departure from the East Coast hip hop sound of his previous releases. Stylistically, it is reminiscent of the works of then-upcoming Internet rappers Wiz Khalifa and Kid Cudi. The song peaked at number 67 on the Billboard Hot R&B/Hip-Hop Songs chart, a significant commercial decline from "Pop Champagne"—the lead single of his previous album Pray IV Reign (2009)—albeit moderately successful for an independent release.

== Background ==
In an interview with Artistdirect, when asked what's the story behind "Perfect Day?" What does that song mean to you? Jones responded

It's a little bit of a different type of record for myself. I was in the studio with Logic trying to do something different, and that's what I came out with. I love "Perfect Day;" it's one of my favorite records that I've done this year. It's really creative. It looks it's doing pretty well at radio right now. I'm not mad. It's for the "pop" culture.

== Music video ==
Directed by Zeus Morand and Jim Jones the video was released on Jim Jones VEVO on March 18, 2011. The video is set in various places including a hospital and features sign language for the hearing impaired. Jones' motivation for the innovative music video came from someone close to him: The mother of one of his close friends is deaf. "She asked, 'Why don't people in the music industry ever have people doing sign language in their videos because they love music, too?' They can feel the beat like anybody else," Jones told the Daily News in an interview at Empire Studio in the Flatiron District. Jones decided "Perfect Day" would be the ideal song to incorporate sign language - and he wanted to learn it as well. Jones dedicated the video to cancer patients or anyone affected by cancer, and to the soldiers at war right now.

== Charts ==
Chart (2011)	Peak position
U.S. Billboard Hot R&B/Hip-Hop Songs	67

== Release history ==
=== Purchasable Release ===
Country	Date	Format	Label	Ref
United States	December 7, 2010	Digital download	E1 Music	
