= Lucien Pellat-Finet =

French fashion designer (1945 - 2024)

- Born: 11 February 1946; Nice
- Died: 26 February 2024 (aged 78); Brazil
- Occupations: Fashion designer, businessman
- Known for: Luxury Cashmere Sweaters

Lucien Pellat-Finet (11 February 1946 – 26 February 2024) was a French fashion designer. He specialised in cashmere and started with knitted luxurious sweaters. Intarsia knitters from Edinburgh are used to knit the sweaters since the area is known for producing high-end cashmere. In 2020, the label was acquired by Thierry Gillier, creative director and CEO of Zadig & Voltaire, who renamed the brand Pellat-Finet. This marked the rebirth of the brand, still producing some of the finest carded cashmere sweaters in the world. The label has a store in Paris located 326 Rue Saint Honoré in the 1er arrondissement.

Lucien Pellat-Finet drowned on 26 February 2024, at the age of 78.
