= We Own the Night (EP) =

EP by Jim Jones
- Released: December 3, 2013
- Recorded: 2012–13
- Genre: Hip hop
- Length: 22:00
- Label: Vampire Life

Jim Jones chronology
Capo (2011)	We Own the Night (2013)	We Own the Night Pt. 2: Memoirs of a Hustler (2014)

Singles from We Own the Night
- 1. "Nasty Girl" Released: July 4, 2013

We Own the Night is the debut EP by American rapper Jim Jones. The EP was released on December 3, 2013, by Vampire Life. The EP features guest appearances from Ricky Blaze, TWO, Jeremih, DJ Spinking, Charlie Rock, Trav, Mel Matrix and Philthy Rich. On July 4, 2013, the EP's first single "Nasty Girl" featuring Jeremih and DJ Spinking was released.

== Track listing ==
No.	Title	Length
1.	"We Got It" (featuring Ricky Blaze)	4:10
2.	"They Watch" (featuring TWO)	3:07
3.	"Nasty Girl" (featuring Jeremih and DJ Spinking)	3:35
4.	"Drink from the Bottle" (featuring Charlie Rock)	3:45
5.	"Heard Me Though"	4:06
6.	"Hypocrits" (featuring Trav, Mel Matrix, and Philthy Rich)	4:33
