= The Heatmakerz =

Hip hop production duo

- Origin: Jamaica
- Genre: Hip-hop
- Occupation: Producer
- Instrument: Akai MPC Snare
- Years active: 2000–present
- Label: Heatmakerz Music
- Members: Rsonist
- Past members: Thrilla (2000–2007)
- Website: http://theheatmakerz.com

The Heatmakerz is the production brand for American record producer and writer Rsonist (Gregory Green). The name originally referred to a duo, consisting of Rsonist and Thrilla, before they separated in 2007. The Heatmakerz emerged in the New York hip-hop scene in the early 2000s, and went on to produce albums that have accumulated a combined total of over 25 million worldwide sales. "Names like DJ Premier, Dr. Dre, and The Neptunes branded a sound that helped shape generations of rap music. Another name you can add to that list is The Heatmakerz," said The Hip-Hop Museum.

The Heatmakerz are widely known for the Diplomats' hits "Dipset Anthem" and "I'm Ready", amongst other tracks, and have produced for artists including Lil Wayne, Beyoncé, Kanye West, Ludacris, Fat Joe, Ghostface Killah, Jeezy, Nicki Minaj, Rick Ross, J. Cole, and Joey Badass.

Rsonist has described the Heatmakerz' sound as combining hip-hop with rock and roll, and as being "aggressive soul music".

== History ==
Born in Mandeville, Jamaica, Rsonist moved to the Bronx, New York at the age of four. Talking about his childhood, Rsonist told Genius, "My parents had reggae music – that's it. That's all I grew up listening to. Whether it was Beres Hammond, whether it was Garnett Silk, whether it was Bob Marley – whoever it was, it was just reggae music."

After high school, Rsonist attended Howard University in Washington, D.C. While there, he also worked as a DJ and developed a friendship with Young Guru, who would go on to work with many of the top artists in hip-hop, most notably becoming Jay-Z's engineer for many years. Shortly into his tenure at the school, Rsonist was expelled from Howard University and forced to move back to The Bronx without any viable options and a newborn baby on the way.

Rsonist soon made his way into beat making as a last resort. It was at this time that the name and the team of the Heatmakerz came about. "So people understand the dynamic of The Heatmakerz and why it's still called Heatmakerz, Heatmakerz was my team growing up," he explained to The Hip-Hop Museum. "Me, Thrilla, my cousin, a bunch of people I grew up with. Me and Thrilla were the only two that physically made music."

Thrilla had bought an MPC and when he went out of town, he let Rsonist borrow it. During that time, Rsonist made two beats. Those beats eventually reached Todd Terry, a Brooklyn-based producer and DJ who was working with top artists at the time. Terry was intrigued and asked if he could purchase the tracks. "I made a joke and said, 'Give me a stack ($1,000) for each beat'," Rsonist told Genius. "He was like 'Aight, bet,' goes in the other room, goes in his safe, brings me back $2,000." Afterward, Terry asked for more beats, to which Rsonist replied that he lacked the equipment to do so. Terry then sent him $20,000 worth of gear to get him started.

It was at this point that Rsonist realized hip-hop could be more than a hobby. Soon after, he was in the studio with Big Pun and Fat Joe, playing them his beats. During the session, Rsonist asked Fat Joe what new producers typically earn per track. Fat Joe replied that they could expect $5,000 or more. "When Joe said $5,000, I just realized that if I take this seriously, I could really turn this into something," he told HuffPost. "Because even then I knew it was all about relationships ... From there, I knew it was always just going to be about figuring out that six degrees of separation. It was common sense. That's when I knew."

== Early career (2000–2007) ==
The Heatmakerz' first major label placement was the track "The C-Quel", which opened Canibus' 2000 album 2000 B.C. (Before Can-I-Bus) on Universal Records. That was followed up with Ghostface Killah's "Ice" off Bulletproof Wallets in 2001.

According to Rsonist, the duo's breakthrough occurred after they made contact with Cam'ron's manager and used the connection to pass several beats along to Cam'ron himself. The Heatmakerz' production appeared on "Come Home with Me" and "Boy Boy" from Cam'ron's 2002 album Come Home with Me; the following year, they wrote and produced eleven songs on The Diplomats' debut album Diplomatic Immunity, which included the hit singles "Dipset Anthem" and "I'm Ready".

In 2007, changing trends in the music industry led Thrilla to step away from making music and instead venture into other businesses, including real estate and trucking. Rsonist continued writing and producing as a solo artist, but continued using the Heatmakerz moniker.

== Rsonist solo (2007–present) ==
After Thrilla's departure, Rsonist continued to write and produce on various projects across the hip-hop world for the next decade plus under the Heatmakerz brand. He made an album with Lil Wayne and Juelz Santana titled I Can't Feel My Face which was never released. Over this time, The Heatmakerz distinct sound was heard on various records including with artists Fat Joe, Asher Roth, Slaughterhouse, Jim Jones, the Diplomats, Cam'ron, and Joell Ortiz.

In 2015, Desiigner's hit single "Panda", which went on to reach number one on the US Billboard Hot 100 and the US Hot R&B/Hip-Hop songs, was recorded in Rsonist's Diamond District Studios in midtown Manhattan. The following year, the Fat Joe and Remy Ma single featuring French Montana's "All the Way Up", which reached number four on the US Rhythmic Billboard chart was also recorded at his studio.

Rsonist became known as the main producer of 2011 XXL Freshman class member and fellow Bronx native, Fred the Godson. The pair released critically acclaimed tapes, even teaming up with Joell Ortiz for the album Gorilla Glue in 2019.

In 2019, Rsonist was the executive producer on the Jim Jones album El Capo, on which he also produced every song. Jones talked about the creation of the album with Revolt, saying: "I got this thing where every night before I walk out, the last 30 minutes of the session, I always record a verse. I'm like, 'Yo, pull that up. Let me record before I leave out.' This [album] is the result of all of those records I recorded before I left the studio. Rsonist called me one day like, 'You got a lot of these records with dope verses on them. You might as well finish these records. Let's do a project.'"

The Heatmakerz regularly produce songs for Joell Ortiz, including his group work with fellow Slaughterhouse founder, KXNG Crooked.

In 2024, The Heatmakerz wrote for the J. Cole album Might Delete Later on the song "Ready '24" which featured Cam'ron. In 2025, The Heatmakerz were back lending the classic New York sound to the Joey Badass single "Pardon Me".

The Heatmakerz are currently continuing to collaborate with Joey Badass on upcoming releases, contributing to the Game's Documentary 3, working with Jim Jones on El Capo 2, some new work with Bishop Lamont, as well as a new M.O.P. project, he confirmed to Hot 97. Rsonist then went on to state: "When I made 'Dipset Anthem,' I was in my mother's basement, broke, and channeling that raw aggression into the music. Now, I'm in a different place in life, and my music reflects how I'm living and feeling in the moment. I never create tracks with a specific artist in mind; I make what feels right, and whoever connects with it, does."

== Discography ==
List of songs written and produced by Release Year, Song Title, Artist(s) and Album Title.
Release Year	Song	Artist(s)	Album
2000	"The C-Quel"	Canibus	2000 B.C. (Before Can-I-Bus)
2001	"Ice"	Ghostface Killah	Bulletproof Wallets
2002	"Come Home With Me"	Cam'ron	Come Home with Me
2002	"Boy Boy"	Cam'ron	Come Home with Me
2003	"Who Am I"	The Diplomats	Diplomatic Immunity
2003	"More Than Music"	The Diplomats	Diplomatic Immunity
2003	"Dipset Anthem"	The Diplomats	Diplomatic Immunity
2003	"This Is What I Do"	The Diplomats	Diplomatic Immunity
2003	"My Love"	The Diplomats	Diplomatic Immunity
2003	"I Love You"	The Diplomats	Diplomatic Immunity
2003	"Purple Haze"	The Diplomats	Diplomatic Immunity
2003	"Juelz Santana The Great"	The Diplomats	Diplomatic Immunity
2003	"DJ Enuff Freestyle"	The Diplomats	Diplomatic Immunity
2003	"I'm Ready"	The Diplomats	Diplomatic Immunity
2003	"Let's Go"	The Diplomats	Diplomatic Immunity
2003	"The Champ Is Here" ft. Freekey Zekey	Juelz Santana	From Me to U
2003	"One Day I Smile"	Juelz Santana	From Me to U
2003	"Okay Okay"	Juelz Santana	From Me to U
2003	"Down"	Juelz Santana	From Me to U
2003	"Monster Music" ft. Opera Steve	Juelz Santana	From Me to U
2003	"Back Again"	Juelz Santana	From Me to U
2003	"How I Feel"	Juelz Santana	From Me to U
2003	"Squalie" ft. J.R. Writer	Juelz Santana	From Me to U
2003	"My Love (Remix)" ft. Jim Jones	Juelz Santana	From Me to U
2003	"Let's Go" ft. Cam'ron	Juelz Santana	From Me to U
2003	"This Is for My Homies" ft. Jim Jones	Juelz Santana	From Me to U
2004	"The Ghetto"	Lil' Flip	U Gotta Feel Me
2004	"Face Off" ft. Ghostface Kilah, Scarface	DJ Kay Slay	The Streetsweeper, Vol. 2
2004	"Untouchables" ft. Prodigy, Raekwon, AZ	DJ Kay Slay	The Streetsweeper, Vol. 2
2004	"The Kennedies" ft. Bristal, C.White	DJ Kay Slay	The Streetsweeper, Vol. 2
2004	"Celebrity Love" ft. Lala, Steph Lova, Sunny, Chinky, Brown Eyes	DJ Kay Slay	The Streetsweeper, Vol. 2
2004	"Intro"	Samy Deluxe	Verdammtnochma!
2004	"Gott Sei Dank"	Samy Deluxe	Verdammtnochma!
2004	"This Is Jim Jones" ft. Cam'ron	Jim Jones	On My Way to Church
2004	"Jamaican Joint" ft. Cam'ron, Juelz Santana	Jim Jones	On My Way to Church
2004	"End of the Road" ft. Bun B, T.I.	Jim Jones	On My Way to Church
2004	"Eyes Open"	I-20	Self-Explanatory
2004	"Meet the Dealer" ft. Ludacris	I-20	Self-Explanatory
2004	"I Wanna Be Your Lady"	The Diplomats	Diplomatic Immunity 2
2004	"Push It"	The Diplomats	Diplomatic Immunity 2
2004	"Bigger Picture"	The Diplomats	Diplomatic Immunity 2
2004	"Crunk Muzik"	The Diplomats	Diplomatic Immunity 2
2004	"More Gangsta Music" ft. Juelz Santana	Cam'ron	Purple Haze
2004	"Killa Cam"	Cam'ron	Purple Haze
2005	"Did It All"	Lord Tariq	The Barcode
2005	"Back In The Building"	The Diplomats	More Than Music Vol. 1
2005	"You Make Me Say" ft. Razah	The Diplomats	More Than Music Vol. 1
2005	"Street Niggaz"	Jeezy	Trap or Die
2005	"That's Who I Am"	Jeezy	Trap or Die
2005	"Oh Yes"	Juelz Santana	What the Game's Been Missing!
2005	"Shottas" ft. Cam'ron, Sizzla	Juelz Santana	What the Game's Been Missing!
2005	"Violence" ft. Bezel	Juelz Santana	What the Game's Been Missing!
2005	"Daddy"	Juelz Santana	What the Game's Been Missing!
2005	"So Sincere"	AZ	A.W.O.L.
2005	"Never Change"	AZ	A.W.O.L.
2005	"Streets On Fire"	Wendy Williams	Brings The Heat Vol. 1
2005	"Just Us (Like I Thought It Would Be)	Junior M.A.F.I.A.	Riot Music
2005	"Million Bucks"	Brooke Valentine	Chain Letter
2005	"Damn Shawty"	Gucci Mane	Trap House
2005	"Tha Mobb"	Lil Wayne	Tha Carter II
2005	"Receipt"	Lil Wayne	Tha Carter II
2006	"I.B.S."	Cam'ron	Killa Season
2006	"Pyrexx Vision / Angel Dust"	40 Cal.	Broken Safety
2006	"American Me"	CL Smooth	American Me
2006	"Warm Outside"	CL Smooth	American Me
2006	"The Stroll"	CL Smooth	American Me
2006	"Giantz of NYC" ft. M.O.P.	DJ Clue	The Professional 3
2006	"Body Bluffin'"	Papoose	The Best of Papoose
2006	"BKNY"	M.O.P.	Ghetto Warfare
2007	"Sleep Well"	Cormega	Who Am I?
2008	"Oh Yeah"	Fat Joe	The Crack Era
2008	"Heat"	40 Cal.	The Yellow Tape
2008	"Come With Me (Freestyle)"	J.R. Writer	Politics and Bullshit
2008	"You're Gonna Love Me"	Duke Da God	Harlem Classics
2009	"Watch Me"	Smoke DZA	Substance Abuse
2010	"I'm Eddy"	Asher Roth	Seared Foie Gras with Quince and Cranberry
2011	"Wie Ein Lowe"	Bushido	Jenseits von Gut und Böse
2012	"High Enough"	Fred the Godson	Gordo Frederico
2012	"Outro (Shelly's Son)"	Fred the Godson	Gordo Frederico
2013	"The Nacirema Dream"	Papoose	The Nacirema Dream
2014	"Why You Leave"	Locksmith	A Thousand Cuts
2014	"Brothers Keeper"	Slaughterhouse	House Rules
2014	"Cold World"	Joell Ortiz	House Slippers
2014	"I Need"	Vado	Sinatra
2015	"I Can't Help It"	CL Smooth	Non-album single
2016	"Kitchen Table" ft. Kevin Gates, Jim Jones	Fred the Godson	Contraband II
2016	"Take 'em to Church"	Fred the Godson	Contraband II
2016	"One Life"	Fred the Godson	Contraband II
2016	"Contraband II Outro"	Fred the Godson	Contraband II
2016	"Two Keys" ft. Fred the Godson	Jim Jones	The Kitchen
2017	"Can You Hear Me"	Fred the Godson	Gordo
2017	"Streets of the Bronx"	Fred the Godson	Gordo
2017	"Be Safe Tho"	Casanova	Non-album single
2018	"Dipset Forever"	The Diplomats	Diplomatic Ties
2018	"Stronger"	The Diplomats, Drama	Uncle Drew Official Soundtrack
2019	"Cristal Occasions"	Jim Jones	El Capo
2019	"Love of the Hustle"	Jim Jones	El Capo
2019	"Make No Issues of It"	Jim Jones	El Capo
2019	"NYC"	Jim Jones	El Capo
2019	"Good Die Young"	Jim Jones	El Capo
2019	"State of the Union" ft. Rick Ross, Marc Scibilia	Jim Jones	El Capo
2019	"Pity In The Summer" ft. Cam'ron, Fred the Godson, Marc Scibilia	Jim Jones	El Capo
2019	"My Era" ft. Maino, Drama	Jim Jones	El Capo
2019	"Nothing Lasts" ft. Fabolous, Marc Scibilia	Jim Jones	El Capo
2019	"Cocaine Dreamin" ft. Ball Greezy, Dave East	Jim Jones	El Capo
2019	"Mama I Made It" ft. Cam'ron	Jim Jones	El Capo
2019	"To Whom It May Concern" ft. Cam'ron, Benny the Butcher, Conway the Machine	Jim Jones	El Capo
2019	"Sports Cars" ft. Curren$y	Jim Jones	El Capo
2019	"Song Boxing"	Jim Jones	El Capo
2019	"Bread Right"	Jim Jones	El Capo
2019	"Don't Know What They Took Him For" ft. Jadakiss	Jim Jones	El Capo
2019	"Toast On Me"	Cam'ron	Purple Haze 2
2019	"Fast Lane"	Cam'ron	Purple Haze 2
2019	"GG Intro (No Smoke)"	Joell Ortiz, Fred the Godson	Gorilla Glue
2019	"P I F (Paid in Full)"	Joell Ortiz, Fred the Godson	Gorilla Glue
2019	"Hallways" ft. DramaB2R	Joell Ortiz, Fred the Godson	Gorilla Glue
2019	"Murder One"	Joell Ortiz, Fred the Godson	Gorilla Glue
2019	"Feliz Navidad" ft. Jim Jones	Joell Ortiz, Fred the Godson	Gorilla Glue
2019	"Kilo"	Joell Ortiz, Fred the Godson	Gorilla Glue
2019	"Raw"	Joell Ortiz, Fred the Godson	Gorilla Glue
2019	"Outstanding"	Joell Ortiz, Fred the Godson	Gorilla Glue
2019	"Move the Crowd"	Joell Ortiz, Fred the Godson	Gorilla Glue
2019	"My God"	Fred the Godson	God Level
2019	"Picture Bars"	Fred the Godson	God Level
2019	"Captain"	Joell Ortiz	Monday
2019	"Champion"	Joell Ortiz	Monday
2019	"Jamican Food"	Joell Ortiz	Monday
2020	"Election" ft. Marc Scibilia, Juelz Santana	Jim Jones	El Capo (Deluxe)
2020	"Anybody"	Jim Jones	El Capo (Deluxe)
2020	"Chasing That Feeling" ft. Marc Scibilia	Jim Jones	El Capo (Deluxe)
2020	"MMTC" ft. Vado, Rain	Jim Jones	El Capo (Deluxe)
2020	"Father Forgive Us" ft. Maino	Jim Jones	El Capo (Deluxe)
2020	"For The Better" ft. DramaB2R	Jim Jones	El Capo (Deluxe)
2020	"Pardon My Thoughts" ft. Dave East	Jim Jones	El Capo (Deluxe)
2020	"Everything" ft. Marc Scibilia	Jim Jones	El Capo (Deluxe)
2020	"Try Again" ft. DramaB2R, Conway the Machine	Jim Jones	El Capo (Deluxe)
2020	"Been Like That" ft. DramaB2R	Jim Jones	El Capo (Deluxe)
2020	"Bad Boyz" ft. Axel Leon, Nino Man, Fred the Godson	Jim Jones	El Capo (Deluxe)
2020	"A Monster Made It"	Jim Jones	El Capo (Deluxe)
2020	"Finito" ft. Fred the Godson	Jim Jones	El Capo (Deluxe)
2020	"Gospel"	Jim Jones	El Capo (Deluxe)
2020	"I'm Alive"	Jim Jones	El Capo (Deluxe)
2020	"Press Play"	Fred the Godson	Training Day
2020	"Memorial Day"	Joell Ortiz, KXNG Crooked	H.A.R.D.
2020	"H.A.R.D."	Joell Ortiz, KXNG Crooked	H.A.R.D.
2020	"Lose My Mind"	Joell Ortiz, KXNG Crooked	H.A.R.D.
2021	"In My Feelings"	Joell Ortiz	Autograph
2021	"Uncle Chris Car"	Joell Ortiz	Autograph
2021	"Masked Up"	Joell Ortiz	Autograph
2021	"Lifeline"	Joell Ortiz	Autograph
2021	"Goin Thru It" ft. Marc Scibilia	Joell Ortiz	Autograph
2021	"Love Is Love" ft. Sheek Louch	Joell Ortiz	Autograph
2021	"Doors Up"	Joell Ortiz	Autograph
2021	"Above The Law"	Curren$y	Collection Agency
2022	"Ocean Terminal" ft. Lin-Manuel Miranda	Joell Ortiz, KXNG Crooked	Harbor City Season One
2022	"Underground"	Joell Ortiz, KXNG Crooked	Harbor City Season One
2022	"Dead Body"	Joell Ortiz, KXNG Crooked	Harbor City Season One
2022	"Don't Forget About Her"	Joell Ortiz, KXNG Crooked	Harbor City Season One
2022	"Vibrate Higher" feat. AZ	Joell Ortiz, KXNG Crooked	Harbor City Season One
2022	"Vacancy"	Joell Ortiz, KXNG Crooked	Rise & Fall of Slaughterhouse
2022	"Dream"	Joell Ortiz, KXNG Crooked	Rise & Fall of Slaughterhouse
2022	"Vacheron" feat. AZ		
2023	"Sunroof"	Joell Ortiz, KXNG Crooked	Prosper
2023	"No More"	Joell Ortiz, KXNG Crooked	Prosper
2024	"W.A.R. Welcome" ft. Phil Collen	Joell Ortiz	W.A.R. (With All Respect)
2024	"Mama Loves Me"	Joell Ortiz	W.A.R. (With All Respect)
2024	"Fortune 500" ft. Phil Collen	Joell Ortiz	W.A.R. (With All Respect)
2024	"Reaper Man"	Joell Ortiz	W.A.R. (With All Respect)
2024	"So Lost"	Joell Ortiz	W.A.R. (With All Respect)
2024	"W.A.R." ft. Styles P	Joell Ortiz	W.A.R. (With All Respect)
2024	"Imagine That"	Joell Ortiz	W.A.R. (With All Respect)
2024	"Please"	Joell Ortiz	W.A.R. (With All Respect)
2024	"My Childhood"	Joell Ortiz	W.A.R. (With All Respect)
2024	"All The Years"	Joell Ortiz	W.A.R. (With All Respect)
2024	"Ready '24" ft. Cam'ron	J. Cole	Might Delete Later
2025	"Pardon Me"	Joey Bada$$	Non-album single
2025	"Church Steps"	Jim Jones	At the Church Steps
2026	"Sumn Out of Nothing"	Jourden	A Tree Grows In Brooklyn
2026	"Seasoned Vet"	Curren$y	Single
