= The Rooftop (album) =

Studio album by Webstar and Jim Jones
- Released: October 6, 2009
- Genre: Hip hop
- Length: 36:41
- Label: Scrilla Hill; E1
- Producer: Dame Grease, Remo Green, DJ Webstar, Jane Minovskaya, Ricky Blaze

Webstar chronology
Uptown Harlem (2008)	The Rooftop (2009)

Jim Jones chronology
Pray IV Reign (2009)	The Rooftop (2009)	Capo (2011)

Singles from The Rooftop
- 1. "Dancin on Me" Released: April 28, 2009; 2. "She Can Get It" Released: September 5, 2009

The Rooftop is a collaborative studio album by American DJ Webstar and American rapper Jim Jones. It was released on October 6, 2009, by E1 Music, as well as Webstar's label imprint Scrilla Hill. The album was supported by two singles: "Dancin on Me" and "She Can Get It".

== Critical reception ==
Professional ratings
Review scores
Source	Rating
AllMusic	2.5/5 stars
HipHopDX	2.5/5 stars
RapReviews	(4.5/10)

Reviews were mixed. Amanda Bassa of HipHopDX said the album is best for "an alcohol-fueled night on the town, the Webstar and Jim Jones collaboration serves as the perfect chaser to an overpriced shot at the club, possessing the energy that will keep people dancing until last call."

== Commercial performance ==
The album sold 2,400 copies its first week, failing to crack the US Billboard 200 or any other major music charts.

== Track listing ==
No.	Title	Length
1.	"Welcome to the Rooftop" (featuring Brucie B)	0:24
2.	"O.M.G." (featuring Ricky Blaze)	4:05
3.	"She Can Get It" (featuring Rex)	3:32
4.	"Uptown (Interlude)" (featuring Ron G and Brucie B)	0:47
5.	"Uptown" (featuring Rex and Styles P)	3:42
6.	"Fast Cars" (featuring Sin)	2:40
7.	"Take You Down" (featuring Brittany Taylor, Rex, and Yung Deion)	4:10
8.	"Hate a Hater" (featuring DJ Miz and Brucie B)	0:37
9.	"In the Air" (featuring Ricky Blaze)	3:01
10.	"Follow Me on Twitter" (featuring Rex, Yung Deion, Young B., and Ricky Blaze)	4:07
11.	"Interlude"" (featuring Brucie B)	0:16
12.	"Dancin on Me" (featuring Juelz Santana)	3:37
13.	"Bring It Over Here" (featuring Rex and Bradhurst)	2:23
14.	"Laughing at the Haters" (featuring Rex, Yung Deion, and Young B.)	3:36
15.	"Rooftop (Outro)" (featuring Brucie B)	0:35
