= Trav (musician) =

American singer, songwriter, and actor

- Born: Travis Daniel Lashley; August 13, 1987 (age 39); Queens, New York City, U.S.
- Genre: Hip hop
- Occupations: Rapper; singer; songwriter; actor; record producer
- Years active: 2009–present
- Label: Empire

Travis Daniel Lashley (born August 13, 1987), better known by his stage name Trav is an American rapper, singer, songwriter, record producer, and actor from Queens, New York.

== Early life ==
Born and raised in Jamaica, Queens, Trav started rapping at the age of 21, catching the attention of NYC tastemakers, including DJ Whoo Kid and DJ Green Lantern. Trav credits his first big break to DJ Green Lantern’s radio show on SiriusXM.

== Career ==
After releasing his 2nd Mixtape "Follow Me" Trav was selected as a Featured Artist on Myspace, which featured both singles "Follow Me" and "Ride the Wave". Trav also met follow artist Sean Kingston on Myspace, in an interview saying "Sean Kingston is really my right hand man. The crazy thing about us, we met on MySpace…. What makes it even crazier, we found out after his mother came home from jail, his mother and my uncle are related in Jamaica. And Sean's grandfather is the one who put my uncle on, gave him his start (in music). It was like a circle." Trav later joined Kingston in supporting Justin Bieber on his "My World Tour’.

On December 8, 2017, Trav released his album QRAK (pronounced as "Crack"), featuring tracks with Meek Mill, Belly, Lil Durk, Tory Lanez, Blac Youngsta & Don Q. The acronym stands for (Queens Raised A King) with Trav saying "The title QRAK stands for Queens Raised A King. I’m from Queens and it has a double metaphor to it like a young queen raised a king and then Queens is my hood, my borough in New York City." In an interview about the album Trav explained "I felt like I was missing a little bit, I felt like I had to bring a little bit of aggression back. I felt like I had to have a different approach to let people know I wasn't playing, that I had records. For my core following, the people whose aware of me they’re going to be like ‘oh damn, I remember this’. I didn't put out music in like a year or two, a year in a half. So now it's like I got to come through like nah he snapping, he's too crazy, you know what I mean? I have to!"

On May 24, 2019, Trav released the single "Called It", featuring Canadian rapper Nav. It was released with the official music video. Trav later joined Nav on his 25-date Bad Habits Tour.

== Discography ==
- The Way I See It (2009)
- Follow Me
- Push (2012)
- Push 2 (2014)
- Push 3 (2016)
- QRAK (2017)
- Nothing Happens Overnight (2020)
- Push 4 (TBA)
