= Jim Jones (rapper) =

American rapper (born 1976)

- Jones in 2008

Background information
- Also known as: Jimmy Jones; CAPO
- Born: Joseph Guillermo Jones II; July 15, 1976 (age 50); The Bronx, New York City, U.S.
- Genres: East Coast hip-hop; gangsta rap
- Occupations: Rapper; songwriter; record executive; music video director
- Works: Jim Jones discography
- Years active: 1997–present
- Labels: Vampire Life; 10K Projects; Heatmakerz; Roc Nation (current); E1; Splash; Columbia; Ether Boy; Koch; Diplomat; Roc-A-Fella; ByrdGang
- Formerly of: The Diplomats; ByrdGang; Lobby Boyz
- Children: 1

Joseph Guillermo Jones II (born July 15, 1976), better known by his stage name Jim Jones (or Jimmy Jones), is an American rapper and record executive. He was a member of the now-defunct hip-hop group the Diplomats (also known as Dipset), which he formed alongside fellow Harlem native Cam'ron in 1997.

Following the commercial success of the group's debut album, Diplomatic Immunity (2003), Jones self-released his debut solo album, On My Way to Church (2004), to moderate success. His second and third albums, Harlem: Diary of a Summer (2005) and Hustler's P.O.M.E. (Product of My Environment) (2006), both peaked within the top ten of the Billboard 200. The release of the former coincided with Jones's appointment as an A&R executive for Entertainment One Music (then known as Koch Records), while the latter was preceded by the single "We Fly High", which peaked at number five on the Billboard Hot 100, received platinum certification from the Recording Industry Association of America (RIAA), and led to Jones briefly signing with Columbia Records.

Jones' fourth album and only release by a major label, Pray IV Reign (2009), was met with continued success and spawned the single "Pop Champagne" (with Ron Browz featuring Juelz Santana), which peaked within the top 40 of the Billboard Hot 100. His fifth album, Capo (2011), was led by the pop rap single, "Perfect Day" (featuring Chink Santana). After a hiatus, he self-released his sixth and seventh studio albums, Wasted Talent (2018) and El Capo (2019).

== Early life ==
Jones, the son of a Puerto Rican father and Aruban mother, was born on July 15, 1976, in the Bronx. He was raised in the Taft Houses project in East Harlem, which he called "the gutter within the gutter." In 1996, Jones made an appearance on New York Undercover.

== Music career ==
=== 2004–05: On My Way to Church and Harlem: Diary of a Summer ===
On My Way to Church is Jones' debut album. The album spawned two singles that made the US Billboard Hot R&B/Hip-Hop Songs chart: "Certified Gangstas" (featuring Cam'ron, Bezel and The Game), which reached number 80, and "Crunk Muzik" (featuring his Dipset cohorts Cam'ron and Juelz Santana), which reached number 84. The album peaked at number 18 on the US Billboard 200 chart, number three on Billboard's Independent Albums chart, and number four on the Top R&B/Hip-Hop Albums chart.

Harlem: Diary of a Summer, Jones' second album, reached number five on the Billboard 200 and topped the Top R&B/Hip-Hop Albums and Independent Albums charts, selling 350,000 copies. Three of its singles placed on the Billboard R&B/Hip-Hop Songs chart: "Baby Girl", which reached number 58; "Summer Wit' Miami", which reached number 78; and "What You Been Drankin' On?" (featuring Diddy, Paul Wall, and Jha Jha), which reached number 106.

"We Fly High"
This song was among the most popular of 2006.

=== 2006–09: Hustler's P.O.M.E., Pray IV Reign and The Rooftop ===
Jones' third album Hustler's P.O.M.E. (Product of My Environment), was more commercial and once again featured Dipset members along with Lil Wayne. The album spawned Jones' biggest single to date, "We Fly High". Jones introduced a signature dance move in the "We Fly High" video, throwing up a fake jump shot every time the ad-lib "Ballin!'" was stated in the song. This dance move became so popular that it inspired Michael Strahan and Plaxico Burress to do the dance move after big plays during a Monday Night Football game in 2006.

From 2006 to 2008, Jones released a collaborative album with his rap group ByrdGang, titled M.O.B.: The Album, which peaked at number 29 on the Billboard 200, selling 16,000 the first week in stores and eventually selling 65,000 units. He has two Christmas compilation albums, A Dipset X-Mas and A Tribute To Bad Santa Starring Mike Epps, and a load of mixtapes, including Harlem's American Gangster, which peaked at number 19 on the Billboard 200 chart and spawned his single "Love Me No More".

Jones' fourth studio album, Pray IV Reign, released March 24, 2009, was his major record label debut. The album peaked at number nine on the Billboard 200 chart. On July 8, Jones released a promotional single titled "The Good Stuff" featuring NOE. The album features "Pop Champagne", producer Ron Browz, and Juelz Santana. A bonus track on the album is "Jackin' Swagga From Us" with Twista, NOE, and Lil Wayne, which takes shots at T.I. and Jay-Z for allegedly stealing their styles and mocking their song "Swagga Like Us". It is his first solo album under Columbia Records. In 2009, Jim Jones became Vice President of Urban A&R at Koch Records, which is now E1 Music. On June 11, Jim Jones appeared on BET's 106 & Park along with DJ Webstar and announced that they will be releasing an album together titled The Rooftop. He also announced that his documentary, This Is Jim Jones, will be released June 30, 2009. The first single from the album is "Dancin on Me", featuring Juelz Santana. It was officially released via iTunes on April 28. On September 22, hip hop website, RapRuckus, stated the album was scheduled for an October 6, 2009 release. The second single is titled "She Can Get It". In December 2009, Jones left Columbia and signed a deal to release his next solo album on E1, formerly Koch, as well as a mixtape.

=== 2010–present: Capo, Dipset reunion and Vampire Life series ===
The mixtape, titled The Ghost of Rich Porter, was released March 23, 2010. In April 2010, Cam'ron and Jim Jones announced they ended their feud. On June 26, 2010, Jones reunited with Cam'ron and Juelz Santana on a track titled "Salute", marking the return of the Diplomats. They have begun working on an album together, and have been reportedly working with Dr. Dre. In 2010, it was confirmed that Jones had started up a new record label imprint with Damon Dash entitled Splash Records. On April 5, 2011, Jones' released his fifth studio album, Capo, on E1. On November 3, Jones released a mixtape, titled Capo Life, to promote the album and celebrate the launch of his new website. The lead single off Capo, "Perfect Day" featuring Chink Santana and LOGiC, was released on iTunes December 7, 2010. The album is the first to feature Cam'ron since Hustler's P.O.M.E. (Product of My Environment). Other guest appearances include rappers The Game, Lloyd Banks, Prodigy, Raekwon and R&B singers Rell and Ashanti among others, and features notable production from longtime collaborator Chink Santana, Aaron LaCrate, Wyclef Jean, Drumma Boy and Lamont "LOGiC" Coleman. The album peaked at number 20 on the Billboard 200, selling 21,000 copies in its first week.

On October 1, 2011, when Funkmaster Flex premiered a song on New York City's Hot 97 titled "It Ain't My Fault" featuring rappers T-Rex, Boogie Black and Sen City, it was revealed that it was the first offering from Webstar and Jones's upcoming second collaborative effort The Rooftop 2. In the summer of 2011, he was featured on Randyn Julius' "Party Tonight" with Teyana Taylor and fellow Dispet member Cam'ron. On October 30, 2011, for the Halloween holiday, Jones released a mixtape titled Vampire Life: We Own the Night. The tape features twenty-four songs, including bonus tracks, freestyles and guest appearances from Meek Mill, J.R. Writer, Chink Santana, 2 Chainz, Maino, Yo Gotti and Jadakiss among others.

On May 1, 2012, Jones released the second installment of his Vampire Life series entitled Vampire Life 2, it went on to be downloaded over 300,000 times on mixtape-sharing website DatPiff. On March 11, 2013, Jones announced he was working on two new mixtapes V3 (Vampire Life 3) and The Ghost Of Rich Porter 2. Vampire Life 3 was released on August 13, 2013. On December 3, 2013, Jim Jones released an extended play (EP), titled We Own the Night. The EP was supported by the single "Nasty Girl", featuring American singer Jeremih. On June 24, 2014, Jones released a single titled "Wit the Shit", featuring American singer Trey Songz. In July 2014, Jones revealed he would be releasing another EP, titled We Own the Night Pt. 2: Memoirs of a Hustler; it was released on September 9.

On January 1, 2015, DJ Funkmaster Flex announced via Instagram that he had spoken to fellow Diplomat members Cam'ron, Jim Jones and Juelz Santana about an upcoming Diplomats mixtape which included fellow member Freekey Zeekey. He also stated that he would be hosting the mixtape along with DJs/producers DJ Khaled, Swizz Beatz and DJ Mustard.

=== 2024–present: Feud with 50 Cent, At the Church Steps and BET Awards return ===
On December 5, 2024, Dipset leader and Harlem rapper Cam'ron's interview with 50 Cent on his show "It Is What It Is" ignited a new feud between Jim Jones, and Cam'ron. Jim Jones took exception to the portion of the interview where Cam'ron told 50 Cent he felt disrespected when he brought out Jim Jones during a 2007 show. The show took place during the height of 50 Cent and Cam'ron's feud.

On 27 February 2025 he release his eighth album named At the Church Steps being a reference to his first album On My Way To Church.

At the BET Awards 2025 he returned to represent Harlem and perform his hit single We Fly High.

== Other ventures ==
=== ByrdGang ===
ByrdGang
- Genre: Hip hop
- Years active: 2006–2010
- Labels: Asylum; ByrdGang
- Past members: Jim Jones; NOE; Freekey Zekey; Mel Matrix; Max B Jha Jha (deceased); Stack Bundles (deceased); Chink Santana

Jones introduced ByrdGang in 2006. The group released their debut album, M.O.B.: The Album on his label ByrdGang Records and Asylum Records.

=== Fashion designing ===
Jones and Damon Dash co-own "Vampire Life Clothing".

=== Acting career ===
Jones made his acting debut in the film State Property 2. He also appeared on the show Crash: The Series. Along with releasing the album Capo, Jones headlined in an off-Broadway musical called Hip-Hop Monologues: Inside the Life and Mind of Jim Jones, produced by Damon Dash and Footage Entertainment.

=== Reality television ===
Jones appeared in a supporting role in seasons 1 and 2 of the VH1 reality show, Love & Hip Hop: New York in 2011. He also later appeared in the final tenth season, in 2020.

Jones also made a brief appearance in the 90s TV Show 'New York Undercover'.

=== Sports management ===
In December 2017, he became part owner of the Richmond Roughriders of the American Arena League.

== Controversies ==
=== Junior M.A.F.I.A. ===
During a basketball game at Rucker Park on August 2, 1999, members of Junior M.A.F.I.A. physically assaulted rap group the Diplomats, including Jim Jones. Jones was seen on camera, fleeing the altercation. The altercation was seen in the 2000 television documentary, On Hallowed Ground: Streetball Champions of Rucker Park.

=== Tru Life ===
In a 2006 interview, Tru Life, responding to rumors, called Dipset bosses Cam'ron and Jim Jones "bitches." Jones responded by challenging Tru Life to fisticuffs, with a US$50,000 wager. Tru Life responded by stealing Jones' necklace and taunting him on the 2007 mixtape Tru York, which featured "a Photoshopped Jim Jones in a Borat-style thong and Cam'ron as a Seventh Avenue transsexual hooker" as the cover. The Diplomats retaliated by hacking Tru Life's MySpace page, replacing the faces on the Tru York cover with Tru Life's and Jay-Z's.

=== Gucci ===
In February 2022, Jones posted an Instagram video in which he detailed his experience of being racially profiled as a result of receiving poor customer service. He expressed his disappointment in Gucci's employees by claiming that “These black people are more racist than white people when they get they job”. He goes on to further detail the event that left him a victim by explaining “I still ain’t get no sparkling water, I still ain’t get no champagne. I still ain’t get nothing.”

=== Jay-Z ===
Jim Jones has criticized Jay-Z's performance as president of Def Jam Recordings. Jay-Z responded with a "diss" track called "Brooklyn High" over the beat from Jones' "We Fly High".

On December 22, 2008, Jones punched and kicked a "friend and colleague" of Jay-Z at a Manhattan Louis Vuitton store; he pleaded guilty to misdemeanor assault the following November.

=== ASAP Mob ===
In a 2014 interview Jim Jones characterized ASAP Mob's style as "not street": "[T]hey're artistic, but they're not from the street... We got bonafide swag and the definition of get fly... Price point and high fashion don't really make it cool." ASAP Mob member ASAP Rocky responded in his solo single "Multiply" by criticizing that characterization as a disingenuous ploy to sell overpriced branded merchandise.

=== Azealia Banks ===
In July 2012, a social media-related conflict between Jim Jones and rapper Azealia Banks had started after Banks disrespected the rapper for getting more credit for her phrase "Vamp", as in Jones' mixtape series and label of the same name, Vampire Life, or his track "Vamp Life". Enraged, Banks disrespected Jim Jones again via a track titled "Succubi".

== Discography ==
Studio albums

- On My Way to Church (2004)
- Harlem: Diary of a Summer (2005)
- Hustler's P.O.M.E. (Product of My Environment) (2006)
- Pray IV Reign (2009)
- Capo (2011)
- Wasted Talent (2018)
- El Capo (2019)
- At the Church Steps (2025)
- The Fall Before the Rise (2025)
- The Landlord (2026)

Collaborative albums

- The Rooftop (with DJ Webstar) (2009)
- The Fraud Department (with Harry Fraud) (2021)
- Gangsta Grillz: We Set the Trends (with DJ Drama) (2022)
- The Lobby Boyz (with Maino) (2022)
- Back In My Prime (with Hitmaka) (2023)

== Filmography ==
=== Film ===
Year	Title	Role	Notes
2002	Paper Soldiers	Masked Dominican #2	
2005	State Property 2	Jimmy Jones	
2006	Killa Season	Himself	Video
2008	Who's Deal?	Devon	
2008	Righteous Kill	Himself	
2009	Red Apples Falling	Himself	
2018	First Lady	Mike	
2019	All In	Bishop	
2021	Miracles Across 125th Street	Big Vamp	TV movie

=== Television ===
Year	Title	Role	Notes
2007–2014	Wild 'n Out	Himself	Guest
2008	The Wire	Man Standing In Front of Store	Cameo/extra
2011–2020	Love & Hip Hop: New York	Himself	Supporting
2012–2013	Chrissy & Mr. Jones	Himself	Main
2016	Jim & Chrissy: Vow or Never	Himself	Main
2017	Tales	Taggert	1 episode
2018	Marriage Boot Camp: Reality Stars Family Edition	Himself	12 episodes
2023	VH1 Family Reunion: Love & Hip Hop Edition	Himself	Main

=== Video Game ===
Year	Title	Role	Notes
2007	Def Jam: Icon	Himself	Playable character; voice role and likeness

== Awards and honors ==
"Pop Champagne" was nominated for Best Collaboration at the 2009 Urban Music Awards.

== See also ==
- List of people from Harlem
