= Cam'ron discography =

Discography of American rapper Cam'ron

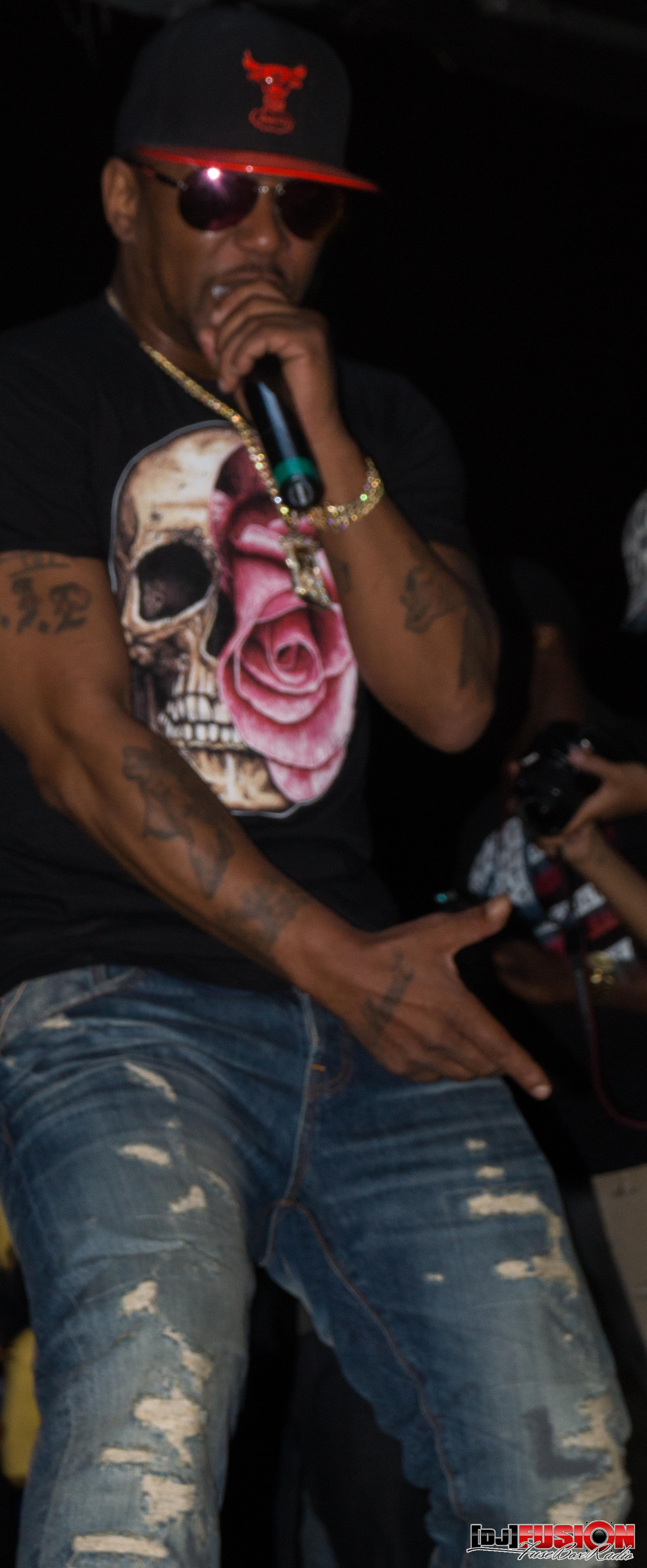
- Cam'ron performing in 2014
- Studio albums: 7
- Extended plays: 7
- Singles: 25
- Music videos: 24
- Mixtapes: 9

The discography of Cam'ron, an American rapper, consists of seven studio albums, three collaborative albums, seven extended plays (EPs), nine mixtapes and 25 singles (including seven as a featured artist).

== Albums ==
=== Studio albums ===
List of studio albums, with selected chart positions and certifications
Title	Album details	Peak chart positions					Certifications
Title	Album details	US	US R&B	US Rap	FRA	UK	Certifications
Confessions of Fire	Released: July 21, 1998; Label: Untertainment, Epic; Format: CD, LP, cassette, digital download	6	2	—	—	95	RIAA: Gold
S.D.E.	Released: September 19, 2000; Label: Untertainment, Epic; Format: CD, LP, cassette, digital download	14	2	—	—	—	
Come Home with Me	Released: May 14, 2002; Label: Diplomat, Roc-A-Fella; Format: CD, LP, cassette, digital download	2	1	—	49	87	RIAA: Platinum; BPI: Silver
Purple Haze	Released: December 7, 2004; Label: Diplomat, Roc-A-Fella; Format: CD, LP, cassette, digital download	20	4	2	—	160	RIAA: Gold
Killa Season	Released: May 16, 2006; Label: Diplomat, Asylum; Format: CD, LP, digital download	2	1	1	—	—	
Crime Pays	Released: May 12, 2009; Label: Diplomat, Asylum; Format: CD, LP, digital download	3	1	1	—	—	
Purple Haze 2	Released: December 20, 2019; Label: Killa; Format: LP, digital download	180	—	—	—	—	

=== Collaborative albums ===
List of collaborative albums, with selected chart positions
Title	Album details	Peak chart positions		
Title	Album details	US	US R&B	US Rap
Heat in Here Vol. 1 (with Vado)	Released: May 25, 2010; Label: Diplomat, Asylum; Format: CD, digital download	133	30	16
Gunz n' Butta (with Vado)	Released: April 19, 2011; Label: Diplomat, E1 Music; Format: CD, digital download	78	15	7
U Wasn't There (with A-Trak)	Released: September 23, 2022; Label: Federal Reserve, Empire; Format: LP, digital download	—	—	—

=== Compilation albums ===
Title	Album details
1st of the Month: Box Set	Released: December 16, 2014; Label: Killa; Format: CD, digital download

== Extended plays ==
List of extended plays, with selected chart positions
Title	EP details	Peak chart positions	
Title	EP details	US R&B	US Rap
1st of the Month Vol. 1	Released: July 1, 2014; Label: Killa; Format: Digital download	34	18
1st of the Month Vol. 2	Released: August 1, 2014; Label: Killa; Format: Digital download	—	—
1st of the Month Vol. 3	Released: September 1, 2014; Label: Killa; Format: Digital download	—	—
1st of the Month Vol. 4	Released: October 1, 2014; Label: Killa; Format: Digital download	—	—
1st of the Month Vol. 5	Released: November 1, 2014; Label: Killa; Format: Digital download	—	—
1st of the Month Vol. 6	Released: December 1, 2014; Label: Killa; Format: Digital download	—	—
Contraband (with Berner)	Released: November 10, 2015; Label: Bern One; Format: Digital download	39	—

== Mixtapes ==
Title	Mixtape details
Public Enemy #1	Released: November 8, 2007; Label: Self-released; Format: Digital download
Boss of All Bosses (with Vado)	Released: August 12, 2009; Label: Self-released; Format: Digital download
Boss of All Bosses 2 (with Vado)	Released: January 12, 2010; Label: Self-released; Format: Digital download
Boss of All Bosses 2.5 (with Vado)	Released: May 12, 2010; Label: Self-released; Format: Digital download
Boss of All Bosses 2.8 (with Vado)	Released: September 5, 2011; Label: Self-released; Format: Digital download
Boss of All Bosses 3 (with Vado)	Released: December 15, 2011; Label: Self-released; Format: Digital download
UNLostFiles (with Vado)	Released: May 11, 2012; Label: Self-released; Format: Digital download
UNLostFiles 2 (with Vado)	Released: May 19, 2012; Label: Self-released; Format: Digital download
Ghetto Heaven Vol. 1	Released: October 1, 2013; Label: Self-released; Format: Digital download
The Program	Released: November 9, 2017; Label: Self-released; Format: Digital download

== Singles ==
=== As lead artist ===
List of singles, with selected chart positions, showing year released and album name
Title	Year	Peak chart positions										Certifications	Album
Title	Year	US	US R&B/HH	US Rap	AUS	FRA	GER	IRE	NZ	SWI	UK	Certifications	Album
"Horse & Carriage" (featuring Mase)	1998	41	9	9	—	—	—	—	—	—	12		Confessions of Fire
"Feels Good" (featuring Usher)	1998	—	54	—	—	—	—	—	—	—	—		Confessions of Fire
"357"	1998	—	88	—	—	—	—	—	—	—	—		Confessions of Fire/Woo (soundtrack)
"Let Me Know"	1999	99	22	2	—	—	—	—	—	—	—		S.D.E.
"My Hood"	1999	—	—	44	—	—	—	—	—	—	—		S.D.E.
"What Means the World to You"	2000	83	30	34	—	—	—	—	—	—	—		S.D.E.
"Oh Boy" (featuring Juelz Santana)	2002	4	1	1	—	—	70	—	50	—	13	BPI: Silver	Come Home with Me
"Hey Ma" (featuring Juelz Santana)	2002	3	7	4	29	55	58	12	15	81	8	RIAA: Platinum; BPI: Silver	Come Home with Me
"Daydreaming" (featuring Tiffany Carlin)	2002	—	67	—	—	—	—	—	—	—	—		Come Home with Me
"Get 'em Girls"	2003	—	99	—	—	—	—	—	—	—	—		Purple Haze
"Shake" (featuring J.R. Writer)	2004	—	74	—	—	—	—	—	—	—	—		Purple Haze
"Hey Lady" (featuring Freekey Zekey)	2004	—	84	—	—	—	—	—	—	—	—		Purple Haze
"Girls"	2004	—	77	—	—	—	—	29	—	—	25		Purple Haze
"Down and Out" (featuring Kanye West and Syleena Johnson)	2005	94	29	20	—	—	—	—	—	—	—		Purple Haze
"Do Ya Thing" (featuring Nicole Wray)	2006	—	65	—	—	—	—	—	—	—	—		Killa Season
"Touch It or Not" (featuring Lil Wayne)	2006	—	62	—	—	—	—	—	—	—	—		Killa Season
"Love My Life" (featuring Nicole Wray)	2006	—	—	—	—	—	—	—	—	—	—		Killa Season
"My Job"	2009	—	—	—	—	—	—	—	—	—	—		Crime Pays
"Get It in Ohio"	2009	—	—	—	—	—	—	—	—	—	—		Crime Pays
"Speaking in Tungs" (with Vado)	2010	—	82	—	—	—	—	—	—	—	—		Gunz n' Butta
"Hey Muma" (with Vado)	2011	—	84	—	—	—	—	—	—	—	—		Gunz n' Butta
"So Bad" (featuring Nicki Minaj and Yummy Bingham)	2014	—	85	—	—	—	—	—	—	—	—		1st of the Month Vol. 2
"Oh Yeah" (featuring Juelz Santana)	2016	—	—	—	—	—	—	—	—	—	—		Killa Season 2
"Believe in Flee"	2019	—	—	—	—	—	—	—	—	—	—		Purple Haze 2
"—" denotes a recording that did not chart or was not released in that territory.

=== As featured artist ===
List of singles, with selected chart positions, showing year released and album name
Title	Year	Peak chart positions									Album
Title	Year	US R&B	US Rap	AUS	FRA	GER	IRE	NZ	SWI	UK	Album
"Banned from T.V." (N.O.R.E. featuring Big Pun, Nature, Cam'ron, Jadakiss and Styles P)	1998	—	—	—	—	—	—	—	—	103	N.O.R.E.
"5 Boroughs" (KRS-One featuring Buckshot, Cam'ron, Keith Murray, Killah Priest, Prodigy, Redman, Run and Vigilante)	1999	79	—	—	—	—	—	—	—	—	The Corruptor: The Soundtrack
"Fabulous" (Diplomat Remix) (Jaheim featuring Cam'ron & Juelz Santana)	2002										Non-album single
"Boy (I Need You)" (Mariah Carey featuring Cam'ron)	2002	68	—	29	51	73	40	45	78	17	Charmbracelet
"Dipset (Santana's Town)" (Juelz Santana featuring Cam'ron)	2003	70	—	—	—	—	—	—	—	—	From Me to U
"Certified Gangstas" (Jim Jones featuring Game and Cam'ron)	2004	80	—	—	—	—	—	—	—	—	On My Way to Church
"Crunk Muzik" (Jim Jones featuring Juelz Santana and Cam'ron)	2004	84	—	—	—	—	—	—	—	—	On My Way to Church/ Diplomatic Immunity 2
"Byrd Call" (J.R. Writer featuring Cam'ron)	2005	—	—	—	—	—	—	—	—	—	History in the Making
"Popular Demand (Popeyes)" (Clipse featuring Pharrell and Cam'ron)	2009	90	—	—	—	—	—	—	—	—	Til the Casket Drops
"Get It" (Mase featuring Cam'Ron and B. Rossi)	2009	—	—	—	—	—	—	—	—	—	Non-album single
"New York City" (The Knocks featuring Cam'ron)	2015	—	—	—	—	—	—	—	—	—	55
"—" denotes a recording that did not chart or was not released in that territory.

== Other charted songs ==
List of songs, with selected chart positions, showing year released and album name
Title	Year	Peak chart positions			Album
Title	Year	US	US R&B/HH	US Rap	Album
"The ROC (Just Fire)" (featuring Beanie Sigel and Memphis Bleek)	2002	—	77	—	Come Home with Me
"Champions" (with Dame Dash, Kanye West, Beanie Sigel, Young Chris and Twista)	2003	—	109	—	Paid In Full/Dream Team
"Yeo"	2003	—	—	—	Music Inspired by Scarface
"Gone" (Kanye West featuring Cam'ron and Consequence)	2005	18	6	4	Late Registration
"You Gotta Love It" (featuring Max B)	2006	—	104	—	Killa Season
"I Am Your Leader" (Nicki Minaj featuring Cam'ron and Rick Ross)	2012	—	71	—	Pink Friday: Roman Reloaded
"The Bluff" (Wiz Khalifa featuring Cam'ron)	2012	—	55	—	O.N.I.F.C.
"—" denotes a recording that did not chart or was not released in that territory.

== Guest appearances ==
List of non-single guest appearances, with other performing artists, showing year released and album name
Title	Year	Other artist(s)	Album
"8 Iz Enuff"	1995	Big L, Buddah Bless, Herb McGruff, Mike Boogie, Terra, Big Twan, Trooper J	Lifestylez ov da Poor & Dangerous
"Gettin' Jiggy Wit It" (So So Def Remix)	1997	Jermaine Dupri, Will Smith, Big Pun, R.O.C.	—N/a
"Good Life"	1998	Sparkle, Nature	Sparkle
"Streets to da Stage"	1998	Lord Tariq and Peter Gunz	Make It Reign
"Freestyle"	1998	Funkmaster Flex, Charli Baltimore	The Mix Tape, Vol. III
"N.B.C."	1998	Charli Baltimore, N.O.R.E.	Rush Hour (soundtrack) / Cold As Ice
"Be All Right"	1998	Kid Capri, Jermaine Dupri	Soundtrack to the Streets
"We Ride"	1998	R. Kelly, N.O.R.E., Jay-Z, Vegas Cats	R.
"Fantastic 4"	1998	DJ Clue?, Big Pun, N.O.R.E., Canibus	The Professional
"Scandalous"	1999	Case	Personal Conversation
"What My Niggas Want"	1999	Busta Rhymes	Violator: The Album
"D.I.P."	1999	Jimmy Jones, Stan Spit	Heat (soundtrack)
"Keep It Real"	1999	Charli Baltimore	Cold As Ice
"Horse & Carriage" (Remix)	1999	Charli Baltimore, Big Pun, Wyclef Jean, Silkk the Shocker	Cold As Ice
"What'd You Come Here For" (Remix)	1999	Trina & Tamara, 50 Cent	Trina & Tamara
"(Do U) Wanna Ride (Diplomats Remix)"	1999	Reel Tight	Back to the Real
"Hate Music"	2000	—N/a	Backstage: Music Inspired by the Film
"Fantastic 4, Pt. 2"	2001	DJ Clue?, The LOX, Nature, Fabolous	The Professional 2
"Suck This Dick"	2001	Luke, Pitbull	Somethin' Nasty
"I Reps"	2001	Queen Pen, DJ Clue, Prodigy	Conversations with Queen
"Awnaw" (Remix)	2002	Nappy Roots, Jazze Pha, Twista	Non-album single
"Ghetto Life"	2002	Birdman, Lil Wayne, TQ	Birdman
"Nahmeanuheard" (Remix)	2002	N.O.R.E., Capone, Fat Joe, Cassidy	God's Favorite
"Champions"	2002	Young Chris, Damon Dash, Kanye West, Twista, Beanie Sigel	Paid in Full (soundtrack)
"Roc Army"	2002	Oschino & Sparks, Young Chris, Jay-Z, Freeway, Peedi Crakk	Paid in Full (soundtrack)
"Bout It Bout It Part III"	2002	The Diplomats, Master P	Paid in Full (soundtrack) / Diplomatic Immunity
"I'm Ready"	2002	The Diplomats	Paid in Full (soundtrack) / Diplomatic Immunity
"You Know What I Want"	2002	Rell	Paid in Full (soundtrack)
"I Am Dame Dash"	2002	Dame Dash, Jim Jones	Paid in Full (soundtrack)
"Don't Fight the Feelin'"	2002	Snoop Dogg, Nate Dogg, Lady May, Soopafly	Snoop Dogg Presents... Doggy Style Allstars Vol. 1
"Boy (I Need You) [Street Remix]"	2003	Mariah Carey, Freeway, Diplomats	Boy (I Need You) EP
"Purple Haze"	2003	DJ Kay Slay	The Streetsweeper, Vol. 1 / Diplomatic Immunity
"Let's Go"	2003	Juelz Santana	From Me to U / Diplomatic Immunity
"Never Scared (The Takeover Remix)"	2003	Bone Crusher, Jadakiss, Busta Rhymes	Non-album single
"We Go Hard"	2003	DMX	Grand Champ
"Sweetness"	2003	Buju Banton	Def Jamaica
"All I Know"	2004	Lil' Flip	U Gotta Feel Me
"Look in Your Eyes"	2004	Young Gunz	Tough Luv
"Harlem"	2004	DJ Kay Slay	The Streetsweeper, Vol. 2
"Only Way Up"	2004	Jim Jones, Juelz Santana	On My Way to Church
"Jamaican Joint"	2004	Jim Jones, Juelz Santana	On My Way to Church
"This Is Jim Jones"	2004	Jim Jones	On My Way to Church
"Overnight Celebrity (Remix)"	2004	Twista, Miri Ben-Ari, Bump J	Non-album single
"I Miss You"	2004	Boyz II Men	Throwback
"Wanted (On the Run)"	2005	Beanie Sigel	The B. Coming
"Gone"	2005	Kanye West, Consequence	Late Registration
"Kill Em"	2005	Juelz Santana	What the Game's Been Missing!
"Shottas"	2005	Juelz Santana, Sizzla	What the Game's Been Missing!
"Murda Murda"	2005	Juelz Santana	What the Game's Been Missing!
"Your Girl (Remix)"	2005	Mariah Carey, Juelz Santaa	Your Girl EP
"Pin the Tail"	2006	Jim Jones, Juelz Santana, Max B	Hustler's P.O.M.E. (Product of My Environment)
"Middle Finger U"	2006	DJ Clue?, Juelz Santana	The Professional 3
"Daddy Back"	2007	Freekey Zekey, Juelz Santana	Book of Ezekiel
"I'm the Shit"	2007	Hell Rell	For the Hell of It
"Stick 'Em"	2007	40 Cal., J.R. Writer	Broken Safety 2
"Stupid Wild"	2009	Gucci Mane, Lil Wayne	The State vs. Radric Davis
"Shoot Em"	2010	Vado	Slime Flu
"Speaking in Tungs"	2010	Vado	Slime Flu
"Body Bag" (Remix)	2010	Fabolous, Vado	There Is No Competition 2: The Grieving Music EP
"Stop the Party" (Remix)	2010	Busta Rhymes, T.I., Ghostface Killah, DMX	—N/a
"Monster Music"	2010	DJ Kay Slay, Vado	More Than Just a DJ
"Blockstars" (Remix)	2010	DJ Kay Slay, Busta Rhymes, Sheek Louch, Rick Ross, Papoose, Vado, Ray J	More Than Just a DJ
"Kilo"	2010	Fat Joe, Clipse	The Darkside Vol. 1
"Christmas in Harlem"	2010	Kanye West, Jim Jones, Vado, CyHi the Prynce, Pusha T, Musiq Soulchild, Teyana Taylor, Big Sean	GOOD Fridays
"Getting to the Money"	2011	Jim Jones, Lady H	Capo
"Salute"	2011	Jim Jones, Juelz Santana	Capo
"Hockey Bag"	2011	Jim Jones, Juelz Santana	Capo
"Ignorant"	2012	Mac Miller	Macadelic
"I Am Your Leader"	2012	Nicki Minaj, Rick Ross	Pink Friday: Roman Reloaded
"Sound Boy"	2012	Busta Rhymes	Year of the Dragon
"Ziplock"	2012	Nyche, Fred the Godson	—N/a
"The Bluff"	2012	Wiz Khalifa	O.N.I.F.C.
"Til My Enemies Crumble"	2012	A-Mafia	Straight Savage
"Every Little Thing" (Remix)	2013	Para One, Irfane, Tekilatex	—N/a
"Love to a Diplomat"	2013	Funkmaster Flex, Lil Wayne	Who You Mad At? Me or Yourself?
"Valley of Kings"	2013	BSBD, SAS, N.O.R.E.	Celestial
"Quarter Million"	2015	Troy Ave	Major Without A Deal
"Bitches Like You"	2016	Wale	Summer on Sunset
"S.D.E."	2016	Dave East	Kairi Chanel
"Moving Weight, Pt. 1"	2016	Pete Rock, Smoke DZA, NymLo	Don't Smoke Rock
"Rubber Band Man"	2017	ASAP Ferg	Still Striving
"Dope Boy"	2018	Berner, Jim Jones	RICO
"Diplomatic Immunity" / "Once Upon a Time"	2018	Jim Jones	Wasted Talent
"Pity in the Summer" / "Mama I Made It" / "To Whom It May Concern"	2019	Jim Jones, Benny the Butcher, Fred the Godson, Guordan Banks, Conway, Rain 910, Marc Scibilia	El Capo
"Goodbye"	2019	Max B, Dave East	House Money
"9 5 . s o u t h"	2021	J. Cole	The Off-Season
"Worst Way"	2022	Noyz Narcos	Virus

== Music videos ==
Year	Song	Album
1998	Horse & Carriage	Confessions of Fire
1998	357	Confessions of Fire
1998	Let Me Know	Confessions of Fire
2000	What Means the World to You?	S.D.E.
2000	My Hood	S.D.E.
2002	Oh Boy	Come Home With Me
2002	Hey Ma	Come Home With Me
2002	Daydreaming	Come Home With Me
2004	Get em Girls	Purple Haze
2004	Girls	Purple Haze
2004	Down & Out	Purple Haze
2006	Touch It or Not	Killa Season
2006	Love My Life	Killa Season
2006	Get Em Daddy (Remix)	Killa Season
2019	Losing Weight 3	Purple Haze 2

== See also ==
- The Diplomats discography
- U.N. discography
