= AraabMuzik production discography =

The following list is a discography of production by AraabMuzik.

== 2006 ==
=== The Diplomats - More Than Music Vol. 2 ===
- 01. "Intro" (performed by 40 Cal. & DukeDaGod)

== 2007 ==
=== Hell Rell - For the Hell of It ===
- 01. "Intro"
- 11. "I'm the Shit" (featuring Cam'ron)
- 12. "Respect Me" (featuring J.R. Writer)

== 2008 ==
=== Hell Rell - Black Mask, Black Gloves ===
- 01. "Intro (Black Gloves)"
- 02. "Get Ready" (featuring Shane O Mac)
- 04. "Think of A Problem"
- 11. "Rumors"

== 2009 ==
=== Starrs & Murph – Boxes for Sale ===
- 05. "Dolla Bills" (featuring Jane Nithrow)
- 06. "Money Over Here" (featuring Vic Damone)
- 10. "My Life"
- 12. "Marry You" (featuring Naledge)
- 14. "Loaded Gun"

=== Dub – FMM2: Family, Money, Music 2 ===
- 00. Red Dot (featuring Cory Gunz & Young Hash)

=== Cam'ron - Crime Pays ===
- 06. "Curve"
  - Sample Credit: Manfred Mann's Earth Band - "For You"
- 08. "Get It in Ohio"
- 12. "Spend the Night" (featuring Lady Lodi)
  - Sample Credit: Kay Cee - "Escape"
- 15. "Chalupa"

=== J.R. Writer - Cinecrack ===
- 08. "Extermination" (featuring Hell Rell)
- 09. "Gorilla Musik"

=== Willy Northpole - Tha Connect ===
- 08. "Skit (Ghetto Tour Guide)"

== 2010 ==
=== DJ Kayslay - More Than Just a DJ ===
- 05. "Monster Music" (featuring Cam'ron & Vado)

=== Capone-N-Noreaga - The War Report 2: Report the War ===
- 13. "Scarface"

=== Cam'ron & The U.N. - Heat In Here Vol. 1 ===
- 1. "Intro"
- 2. "Like Shiiiiit"
- 3. "Throw It Up"
- 4. "Its Your Party"
- 6. "Butta"
- 7. "Fuck The Other Side"
- 8. "Cuffin" (featuring Gucci Mane)
- 9. "Fed Story"
- 11. "Horror Story"
- 12. "On My Shiznit"
- 13. "La Bumba"
- 14. "Ride With Me"

== 2011 ==
=== Jim Jones - Capo ===
- 07. "Drops Is Out" (featuring Raekwon, Mel Matrix & Sen City)
- 16. "Salute" (featuring Cam'ron & Juelz Santana) (Bonus Track)

=== Cam'ron & Vado - Gunz n' Butta ===
- 01. "Killa"
- 02. "American Greed"
- 03. "Heat in Here"
- 04. "Face-Off vmo"
- 05. "I-Luv U"
- 06. "Put A Bird Up"
- 07. "Monster Muzik"
- 10. "Lights, Camera, Action" (featuring Skylynn)
- 11. "Stop It 5"
- 14. "We All Up in Here"
- 15. "Be With Me"

=== Lungz - DreamKillaz ===
- 15. "Get in Tune" (featuring Mic Terror) (Bonus Track)

=== Tuge - The Scrimmage ===
- 17. "Rapper Down" (featuring Sean-Don & G-Eyez)

=== Lloyd Banks - The Cold Corner 2 ===
- 01. "1,2,3 Grind" (featuring Prodigy)

Leftover

- 00. "Love Me in the Hood"

=== Styles P - Master of Ceremonies ===
- 04. "Ryde on da Regular"

=== Tragedy Khadafi - Thug Matrix 3 ===
- 01. "Narcotic Lines"

=== Various artists - America's Most Hated ===
- 04. "Presidential Rolex" (performed by Vado, C Nellz & Jae Millz)

=== Bushido - Jenseits von Gut und Böse ===
- 05. "Gesucht und gefunden"

== 2012 ==
=== 50 Cent - The Lost Tape ===
- 03. "Murder One" (featuring Eminem)

=== Slaughterhouse - Welcome to: Our House ===
- 05. "Hammer Dance"

=== ASAP Mob - Lords Never Worry ===
- 08. "Dope, Money and Hoes"
- 10. "Y.N.R.E."

=== Styles P - The World’s Most Hardest MC Project ===
- 02. "Araab Styles"

=== Swizz Beatz - Haute Living ===
- "Street Knock" (featuring ASAP Rocky)

=== Joe Budden - A Loose Quarter ===
- 02. "Words of a Chameleon"
- 05. "Through My Eyes" (featuring Tsu Surf)
- 09. "So Good" (featuring Emanny)

=== Fabolous - The S.O.U.L. Tape 2 ===
- 11. "Beauty" (featuring Wale)

=== Various artists - Fool's Gold Presents: Loosies ===
- 03. "Molly Ringwald" (performed by Danny Brown)

== 2013 ==
=== Funkmaster Flex - Who You Mad At? Me or Yourself? ===
- 02. "Money Talks" (performed by Fabolous)

=== Nacho Picasso - Vampsterdam ===
- 00. "Vampire" (featuring Avatar Darko)

=== Apache Chief - Upstate of Mind ===
- 01. "Here To Stay"

=== Chase N. Cashe - Charm ===
- 09. "Ransom Note"

=== Hype Holla - HYPEothetically ===
- 01. "My City"
- 02. "Welcome to Rhode Island"
- 03. "Get It Started"
- 04. "Right Here"
- 06. "Ends Tonight"
- 08. "Hands Up" (featuring Freeway)
- 09. "Southside"
- 10. "Pain In My Eyes"
- 11. "Over There" (featuring Bankoz)

=== Hype Holla & Writes - #team401 ===
- 02. "Monster"

=== Mt Eden - Sierra Leone (Feat. Freshly Ground) [Remixes] - EP ===
- 03. "Sierra Leone Feat. Freshly Ground AraabMuzik Remix"

=== Troy Ave - New York City: The Album ===
- 15. "Regretful"

== 2014 ==
=== Slaughterhouse - House Rules ===
- 05. "Keep It 100"
- 09. "I Ain't Bullshittin'"

=== Azealia Banks - Broke With Expensive Taste ===
- 09. "Ice Princess"

== 2015 ==
=== Various artists - Southpaw (Music from and Inspired By the Motion Picture) ===
- 07. "R.N.S." (performed by Slaughterhouse) (produced with Just Blaze)

=== Joe Budden - All Love Lost ===
- 06. "Love, I'm Good" (co-produced by Karon Graham)
- 08. "Slaughtermouse"

=== Lloyd Banks - Halloween Havoc 2 ===
- 02. "Angel Dust"

=== Fabolous - Summertime Shootout ===
- 11. "Started Something" (featuring Daphne Larue)

== 2016 ==
=== Royce da 5'9" - Tabernacle: Trust the Shooter ===
- 06. "The Banjo" (featuring Westside Gunn, Conway & Styles P)

=== Fabolous - Summertime Shootout 2: The Level Up ===
- 06. "4AM Flex" (featuring Tory Lanez)
- 12. "Ah Man" (produced with !llmind)

=== Torii Wolf - Flow Riiot ===
- 05. "Body"

=== Joe Budden - Rage & The Machine ===
- 01. "Three"
- 02. "Uncle Joe"
- 03. "Serious" (featuring Joell Ortiz)
- 04. "By Law" (featuring Jazzy)
- 05. "Flex" (featuring Tory Lanez & Fabolous)
- 06. "Forget"
- 07. "I Gotta Ask"
- 08. "Time for Work" (featuring Emanny)
- 09. "Wrong One"
- 10. "I Wanna Know" (featuring Stacy Barthe)
- 11. "Idols"

== 2018 ==
=== Kollegah – Monument ===
- 01. "Orbit (Intro)"
- 02. "Dear Lord"
- 03. "Blow Out"
- 04. "Royal"
- 06. "Bossmove"
- 07. "Gospel"
- 10. "La Vida Koka"
- 11. "Makiaveli"
- 12. "Realtalk"
- 13. "Continental" (featuring Nas)
- 14. "Donlife" (featuring Cam'ron)
- 15. "Cohiba Symphony"

=== Kollegah – Hoodtape Volume 3 ===
- 26. "Testament"

== 2018 ==
=== Swizz Beatz − Poison ===
- 04. "Something Dirty/Pic Got Us" (featuring Kendrick Lamar, Jadakiss and Styles P)
- 08. "25 Soldiers" (featuring Young Thug)

== 2019 ==
=== Fabolous − Summertime Shootout 3: Coldest Summer Ever ===
- 01. "Cold Summer"
- 12. "Insecure"

== 2020 ==
=== The Lox − Living Off Xperience ===
- 01. "Gave It to Em" (produced with Swizz Beatz)

=== Jay Electronica − A Written Testimony ===
- 03. "The Blinding" (featuring Jay-Z and Travis Scott) (produced with Hit-Boy)
