= Loaded Gun =

Loaded Gun may refer to:

== Film and TV ==
- Loaded Guns (Italian: Colpo in canna), a 1975 Italian action movie

== Music ==
- Loaded Gun (album), by Gloryhound 2014
- Loaded Gun, video album by Flatfoot 56
- Loaded Gun, EP by Dead Horse 2014

=== Songs ===
- "Loaded Gun", song by 6lack from East Atlanta Love Letter
- "Loaded Gun", song by The Dead 60s from The Dead 60s
- "Loaded Gun", song by Tyler Hilton 2012
- "Loaded Gun", song by Black Rebel Motorcycle Club from B.R.M.C.
- "Loaded Gun", song by Slaughter from Stick It Live
- "Loaded Gun", song by Lightning Dust
- "Loaded Gun", song by Bret Michaels from Songs of Life
- "Loaded Gun", song by The Reverend Horton Heat from The Full-Custom Gospel Sounds of the Reverend Horton Heat
- "Loaded Gun", song by Elemeno P from Elemeno P
- "Loaded Gun", a song by Joe Budden
- "Loaded Gun", song by American Steel 1999
- "Loaded Gun", song by Katalyst from What's Happening (featuring Joe Volk)
- "Loaded Gun", song by Swedish Erotica
- "Loaded Gun", song by Airbourne from No Guts. No Glory.
- "Loaded Gun", song by Medication from Prince Valium
- "Loaded Gun", song by Dionysus from Sign of Truth
- "Loaded Gun", song by Hednoize from La Femme Nikita: Music from the Television Series
- "Loaded Gun", song by Wrench in the Works from Lost Art of Heaping Coal
- "Loaded Gun", song by Ruby Joe from Hot Rod Deluxe 1999
- "Loaded Gun", song by Quiet Riot from Terrified 1994
- "Loaded Gun", a song by Starrs & Murph which was produced by AraabMuzik
- "Loaded Gun", a track on the Total Nonstop Action Wrestling album Delirium
