= List of Billboard number-one R&B/hip-hop albums of 2009 =

This page lists the albums that reached number one on the Top R&B/Hip-Hop Albums and Top Rap Albums charts in 2009. The Rap Albums chart partially serves as a distillation of rap-specific titles from the overall R&B/Hip-Hop Albums chart.

The top-selling R&B/hip-hop album for the year was I Am... Sasha Fierce by Beyoncé, which was released in November 2008.

== Chart history ==
Key
†	Indicates best-performing albums of 2009

Issue date	R&B/Hip-Hop Albums	Artist(s)	Rap Albums	Artist(s)	Refs.
January 3	A Different Me	Keyshia Cole	Da REAList	Plies	
January 10	A Different Me	Keyshia Cole	Da REAList	Plies	
January 17	A Different Me	Keyshia Cole	Da REAList	Plies	
January 24	A Different Me	Keyshia Cole	Da REAList	Plies	
January 31	Notorious	Soundtrack / The Notorious B.I.G.	Notorious	Soundtrack / The Notorious B.I.G.	
February 7	A Different Me	Keyshia Cole	Notorious	Soundtrack / The Notorious B.I.G.	
February 14	A Different Me	Keyshia Cole	Da REAList	Plies	
February 21	Intuition	Jamie Foxx	Da REAList	Plies	
February 28	The Rebirth	Bobby V	Paper Trail	T.I.	
March 7	Uncle Charlie	Charlie Wilson	Paper Trail	T.I.	
March 14	Intuition	Jamie Foxx	Paper Trail	T.I.	
March 21	Intuition	Jamie Foxx	Paper Trail	T.I.	
March 28	Love vs. Money	The-Dream	Paper Trail	T.I.	
April 4	Love vs. Money	The-Dream	Don't Feed da Animals	Gorilla Zoe	
April 11	In a Perfect World...	Keri Hilson	Pray IV Reign	Jim Jones	
April 18	LOtUSFLOW3R / MPLSound / Elix3r	Prince / Bria Valente	UGK 4 Life	UGK	
April 25	The Last Kiss	Jadakiss	The Last Kiss	Jadakiss	
May 2	Forever in a Day	Day26	The Last Kiss	Jadakiss	
May 9	Deeper Than Rap	Rick Ross	Deeper Than Rap	Rick Ross	
May 16	Deeper Than Rap	Rick Ross	Deeper Than Rap	Rick Ross	
May 23	Epiphany	Chrisette Michele	Deeper Than Rap	Rick Ross	
May 30	Crime Pays	Cam'ron	Crime Pays	Cam'ron	
June 6	Relapse	Eminem	Relapse	Eminem	
June 13	Relapse	Eminem	Relapse	Eminem	
June 20	Relapse	Eminem	Relapse	Eminem	
June 27	The E.N.D.	The Black Eyed Peas	Relapse	Eminem	
July 4	The E.N.D.	The Black Eyed Peas	Relapse	Eminem	
July 11	A Man's Thoughts	Ginuwine	Relapse	Eminem	
July 18	Jeremih	Jeremih	If Tomorrow Comes...	Maino	
July 25	BLACKsummers'night	Maxwell	Relapse	Eminem	
August 1	BLACKsummers'night	Maxwell	Category F5	Twista	
August 8	BLACKsummers'night	Maxwell	Category F5	Twista	
August 15	Loso's Way	Fabolous	Loso's Way	Fabolous	
August 22	I Get Around	K'Jon	Loso's Way	Fabolous	
August 29	BLACKsummers'night	Maxwell	Loso's Way	Fabolous	
September 5	Turn Me Loose	Ledisi	Imperial Blaze	Sean Paul	
September 12	Lady Love	Letoya	Loso's Way	Fabolous	
September 19	I Look to You	Whitney Houston	Pitbull Starring in Rebelution	Pitbull	
September 26	The Blueprint 3	Jay-Z	The Blueprint 3 †	Jay-Z	
October 3	The Blueprint 3	Jay-Z	The Blueprint 3 †	Jay-Z	
October 10	The Blueprint 3	Jay-Z	The Blueprint 3 †	Jay-Z	
October 17	Memoirs of an Imperfect Angel	Mariah Carey	The Blueprint 3 †	Jay-Z	
October 24	The Blueprint 3	Jay-Z	The Blueprint 3 †	Jay-Z	
October 31	The Blueprint 3	Jay-Z	The Blueprint 3 †	Jay-Z	
November 7	The Blueprint 3	Jay-Z	The Blueprint 3 †	Jay-Z	
November 14	Michael Jackson's This Is It	Michael Jackson	The Blueprint 3 †	Jay-Z	
November 21	Michael Jackson's This Is It	Michael Jackson	The Blueprint 3 †	Jay-Z	
November 28	Michael Jackson's This Is It	Michael Jackson	The Blueprint 3 †	Jay-Z	
December 5	Before I Self Destruct	50 Cent	Before I Self Destruct	50 Cent	
December 12	Rated R	Rihanna	Before I Self Destruct	50 Cent	
December 19	Untitled	R. Kelly	Before I Self Destruct	50 Cent	
December 26	Graffiti	Chris Brown	The State vs. Radric Davis	Gucci Mane	

== See also ==
- 2009 in music
- 2009 in hip hop music
- List of number-one R&B/hip-hop songs of 2009 (U.S.)
- List of Billboard 200 number-one albums of 2009
