= 1st of the Month Vol. 6 =

EP by Cam'ron
- Released: December 1, 2014
- Recorded: 2012–2014
- Genre: Hip-hop
- Label: Killa

Cam'ron chronology
1st of the Month Vol. 5 (2014)	1st of the Month Vol. 6 (2014)	Purple Haze 2 (2019)

1st of the Month Vol. 6 is the sixth EP by American rapper Cam'ron. The EP was released on December 1, 2014, by Killa Entertainment.

== Background ==
In October 2013, Cam'ron announced that he would release an EP and an episode of his web series every month starting on January 1, 2014. In February 2014, he gave an update on the EP plans, saying: "I got the First of the Month project coming out probably next month. Dame put together the A-Trak collaboration which is called Federal Reserve. me and Smoke DZA got a project going on. It’s like five different projects, basically what we’re doing now is just trying to figure out the timing for everything. It’s probably 150 new songs done." In an April 2014, interview with Mass Appeal, he explained why he decided to release a series of EPs, saying: "Just setting everything up. Music has changed and it’s always fun, but I like to make money while I'm making music, so I just had to figure out a new strategy. Things are changing and if you don’t change with the times you gon get stuck in the past. I’ve been working on this thing called The First of the Month. I'm putting out an EP every month with a 30-minute episode so you're not waiting a year or more for the next album."
