= Barry Bonds (disambiguation) =

Barry Bonds (born 1964) is an American former professional baseball player in Major League Baseball.

Barry Bonds may also refer to:

- "Barry Bonds", a 2007 hip-hop song by Kanye West featuring Lil Wayne from Graduation
- Barry Bondz (born 1982), American rapper
