= Barry Bondz =

American rapper (born 1982)

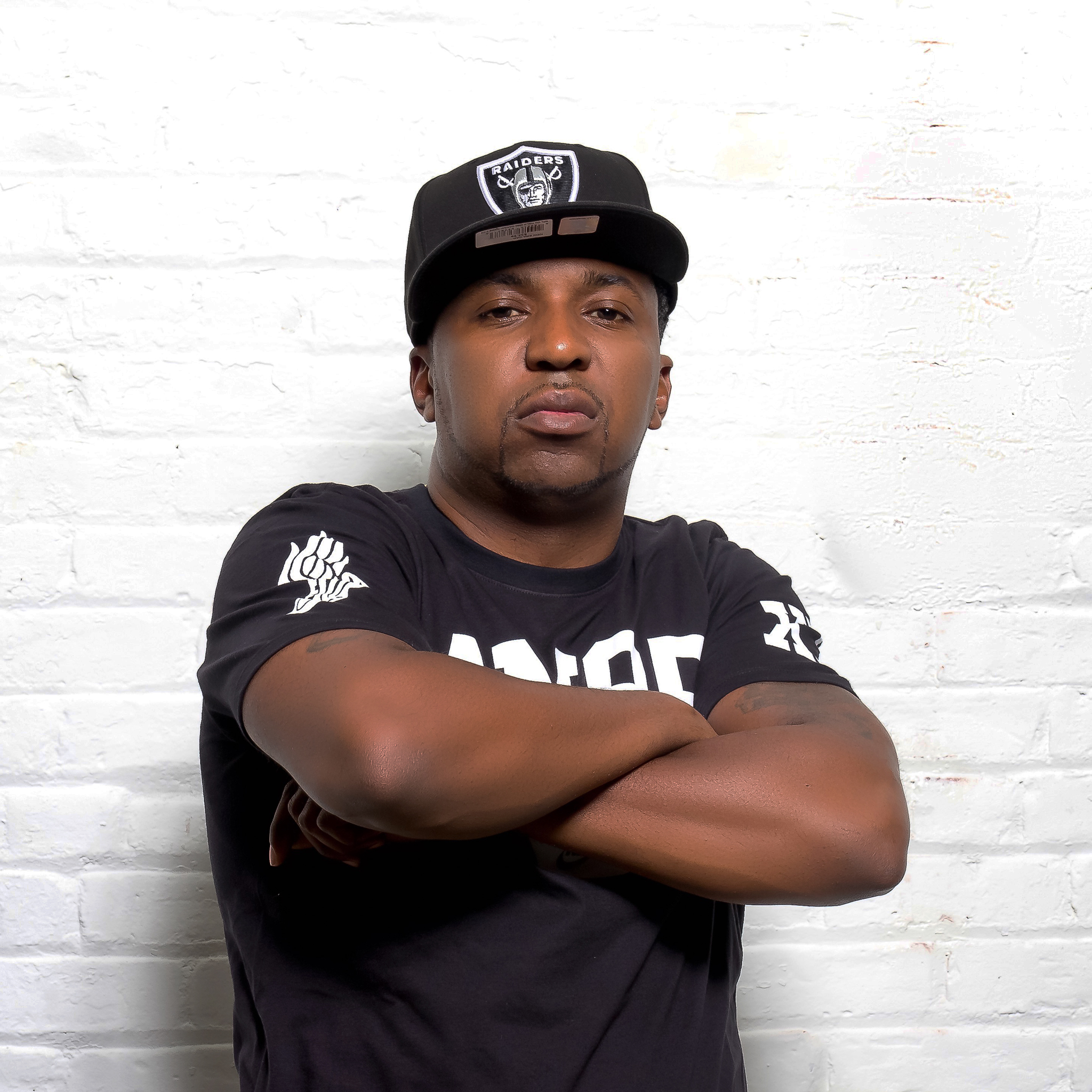

Background information
- Born: Barry Mcrimmon; April 19, 1982 (age 44)
- Origin: Newark, New Jersey
- Genres: Hip-Hop
- Occupations: Rapper, Songwriter
- Years active: 2012-present
- Label: Genco Media LLC
- Website: barrybondz.com

Barry Mcrimmon, known professionally as Barry Bondz, is an American rapper, lyricist and songwriter.

His most notable work to date is Psalms 27 album released in 2016 after the successful release of The Genco in 2015. In 2016, Bondz released "High" on Vibe Magazine June 18, 2016.

Barry Bondz's Genco Media, LLC. apparel company produces t-shirts, hoodies, and phone cases. Bondz appeared on "Brown and Scoop" a CBS podcast earlier this year to discuss his work and latest ventures.

In 2012, Bondz was featured on an album by Neako called "These Are The Times".

Bondz is a songwriter/member of The Addixs who have done work with, Jim Jones, Vado, Busta Rhymes and many more.

== Albums ==
- "Glory" (2014)
- "The Genco" (2015)
- "Psalms 27" (2016)
- "The Genco II" (August 2017)
- "MMIX" (2018)

== Mixtapes ==
- "C4" (June 2017)
