= Purple Haze 2 =

Studio album by Cam'ron
- Released: December 20, 2019
- Recorded: 2019
- Genre: Hip hop
- Length: 52:47
- Labels: Killa; Cinematic
- Producers: ADM Authentic; Cam & Rek; Skitzo; Get Large; Heatmakerz; INFONOVA; The Bedroom Wizard; Trizzy

Cam'ron chronology
Gunz n' Butta (2011)	Purple Haze 2 (2019)	Ghetto Heaven Vol. II (2020)

Professional ratings
Review scores
Source	Rating
Pitchfork	7/10

Purple Haze 2 is the seventh studio album by American rapper Cam'ron. This is his first album in 10 years. It was released on December 20, 2019, via Killa Entertainment and Cinematic Music Group. It serves as a sequel to his 2004 album Purple Haze and features guest appearances from Max B, Mimi Faust, Disco Black, Jim Jones, Shoota93 and Wale. The album peaked at number 180 on the Billboard 200 in the United States. The album received positive reviews from the music publications that did review it, though it was mostly overlooked by music critics.

== Track listing ==
Credits adapted from Tidal.

Purple Haze 2 track listing
No.	Title	Writer(s)	Producer(s)	Length
1.	"Toast to Me"	Cameron Giles	The Heatmakerz	3:39
2.	"Medellin"	Giles	ADM Authentic	3:30
3.	"Losin' Weight 3"	Giles	CAM & REK	4:08
4.	"K.O.P."	Giles	Get Large	3:39
5.	"I Don't Know" (featuring Wale)	Giles; Olubowale Victor Akintimehin	REK	3:28
6.	"Big Deal"	Giles	The Heatmakerz	3:13
7.	"Fast Lane"	Giles	The Heatmakerz	3:19
8.	"The Right One"	Giles	The Bedroom Wizard	3:30
9.	"This is My City" (featuring Max B)	Giles; Charley Wingate	REK	3:04
10.	"Keep Rising" (featuring Max B)	Giles; Wingate	CAM & REK	2:17
11.	"The Get Back" (featuring Mimi)	Giles; Oluremi Fela James	Skitzo	3:24
12.	"Just Be Honest" (featuring Mimi)	Giles; James	I.N.F.O. & NOVA	2:58
13.	"Ride the Wave"	Giles	Trizzy	3:25
14.	"Killa Bounce" (featuring Disco Black)	Giles	Skitzo	2:46
15.	"Believe in Flee"	Giles	Skitzo	2:39
16.	"Straight Harlem" (featuring Jim Jones and Shoota93)	Giles; Joseph Guillermo Jones II; Shoota93	REK	3:41
Total length:				52:47

== Personnel ==
- Nik Hotchkiss – mixing & mastering
- Vaughn "REK" Beck – mixing & mastering
- Pencil Fingerz – album cover design

== Charts ==
Chart (2020)	Peak position
US Billboard 200	180
US Independent Albums (Billboard)	14
