= Horse & Carriage =

Single by Cam'ron featuring Mase

from the album Confessions of Fire
- Released: June 30, 1998
- Recorded: 1997
- Genre: Hip-hop
- Length: 4:02
- Label: Untertainment; Epic
- Songwriter: Cameron Giles
- Producer: Trackmasters

Cam'ron singles chronology
"357" (1998)	"Horse & Carriage" (1998)	"Banned from T.V." (1998)

Mase singles chronology
"What You Want" (1997)	"Horse & Carriage" (1998)	"Lookin' at Me" (1998)

"Horse & Carriage" is the lead single from Cam'ron's debut album, Confessions of Fire. It was released through Untertainment and Epic Records. The song was produced by Trackmasters and Cam'ron's childhood friend Mase was featured on the song's hook.

== Background ==
The song narrowly missed the top 40 of the Billboard Hot 100, peaking at number 41. It also was a top 10 hit on both the R&B and rap charts, peaking at number nine on both charts. "Horse & Carriage" was the most successful of the three singles released from the album as the two follow-up singles failed to make an impact on the charts. A remix was also released featuring Big Pun, Charli Baltimore, Silkk the Shocker and Wyclef Jean. It was produced by Darrell "Digga" Branch and sampled the opening theme to the 1980s TV series Night Court.

== Controversy ==
In 2025, rapper Cuban Link called out Cam'ron for allegedly stealing "Horse and Carriage" from him. Cuban says that "Horse and Carriage" was planned to be his debut single but allegedly got stolen from him. Cuban's debut single was eventually "Flowers For The Dead" which was released on June 6, 2000 under Atlantic Records as the lead single to Cuban's 24K album. Cam'ron has responded to Cuban and claims he is innocent and that someone else stole the song and that he wasn't aware of the song being for Cuban.

== Track listing ==
=== A-Side ===
1. "Horse & Carriage" (Clean Version) - 4:02
2. "Horse & Carriage" (T.V. Track) - 4:02
3. "Horse & Carriage" (Instrumental) - 4:02
4. "Horse & Carriage" (A Cappella) - 4:02

=== B-Side ===
1. "Horse & Carriage" (Dirty Version) - 4:02
2. "Fuck You" (Dirty Version) - 2:36
3. "Fuck You" (T.V. Track) - 1:55

== Charts ==
=== Weekly charts ===
Chart (1998)	Peak position
Billboard Hot 100	41
Billboard Hot R&B/Hip-Hop Singles & Tracks	9
Billboard Hot Rap Singles	9
Billboard Rhythmic Top 40	17

=== Year-end charts ===
Chart (1998)	Position
UK Urban (Music Week)	7
Billboard Hot R&B/Hip-Hop Singles & Tracks	59
