= 1st of the Month Vol. 1 =

EP by Cam'ron
- Released: July 1, 2014
- Recorded: 2013–2014
- Genre: Hip hop
- Length: 17:10
- Label: Killa

Cam'ron chronology
Gunz n' Butta (2011)	1st of the Month Vol. 1 (2014)	1st of the Month Vol. 2 (2014)

1st of the Month Vol. 1 is the first EP by American rapper Cam'ron. The EP was released on July 1, 2014, by Killa Entertainment.

== Background ==
In October 2013, Cam'ron announced that he would release an EP and an episode of his web series every month starting on January 1, 2014. In February 2014, he gave an update on the EP plans, saying: "I got the First of the Month project coming out probably next month. Dame put together the A-Trak collaboration which is called Federal Reserve. me and Smoke DZA got a project going on. It’s like five different projects, basically what we’re doing now is just trying to figure out the timing for everything. It’s probably 150 new songs done." In an April 2014, interview with Mass Appeal, he explained why he decided to release a series of EP's, saying: "Things are changing and if you don’t change with the times you gon get stuck in the past. I’ve been working on this thing called The First of the Month. I’m putting out an EP every month with a 30-minute episode so you’re not waiting a year or more for the next album."

In May 2014, in an interview with MTV News, he spoke about the features on the EP's saying: "The people that’s gonna be on this project is Nicki Minaj, 2 Chainz, Wiz Khalifa, Estelle and Gunplay, so far." He also announced the first EP would be released on July 1, 2014, saying: "The first one is July 1 for the visual, July 3 for the music. And we’ll put it out — the visual — every first of the month. So, August 1 will be another visual, September 1. And then, whatever the first Tuesday is of every month, we’ll be doing the music, as well." On June 26, 2014, the music video was released for "Funeral". On July 1, 2014, the first episode of the web series was released along with the EP. On July 2, 2014, the music video was released for "Put It In the Sky" featuring Un Kasa.

== Critical reception ==
Professional ratings
Review scores
Source	Rating
HipHopDX	3.5/5 stars
XXL	(L)

1st of the Month Vol. 1 was met with generally positive reviews from music critics. David Inkeles of XXL gave the album an L, saying "...the project deserves a shot for the same rationale behind why the good folks in Charlie Rangel’s district voted him to go to Congress one last time: because we love the same old Cam; and like those voters, we listeners know what to expect when it comes to Cam’ron..." Sheldon Pearce of HipHopDX gave the album three and a half stars out of five, saying "The 1st Of The Month EP feels like Cam’ron working his way back into album shape; however, and it is a marked achievement to take two features from perennial placeholders on the Dipset undercard and turn them into salvageable records. The Un Kasa-led “Put It In The Sky” is the most anthemic song on the EP with a chanting refrain that is rousing. It is a prime example of Cam at his showy best, blurring the lines between fact and fiction, confessions and quips."

== Track listing ==
No.	Title	Producer(s)	Length
1.	"Other Side" (featuring Sen City)	Superstar O	3:42
2.	"Talk About It"	Skitzo	3:46
3.	"Funeral"	ADM Beatz & Frank Nitti Beats	3:26
4.	"Put It In the Sky" (featuring Un Kasa)	araabMUZIK	3:20
5.	"Homicide"	ADM Beatz	3:04
Total length:			17:10

== Chart positions ==
Chart (2014)	Peak position
US Top R&B/Hip-Hop Albums (Billboard)	34
