= Heat in Here Vol. 1 =

Studio album by Cam'ron & the U.N.
- Released: May 25, 2010
- Genre: Hip hop
- Length: 54:57
- Labels: Diplomat; New Era; Asylum; WMGreen
- Producers: AraabMuzik; Skitzo

Cam'ron chronology
Crime Pays (2009)	Heat in Here Vol. 1 (2010)	Gunz n' Butta (2011)

Heat in Here Vol. 1 is the debut studio album by Harlem hip hop duo U.N., which is composed of Cam'ron and Vado. It was released on May 25, 2010, by Diplomat Records and Asylum Records. The album features guest appearances from Young Chris, Gucci Mane and Felony Fame.

== Critical response ==
Professional ratings
Review scores
Source	Rating
AllMusic	3.5/5 stars

David Jeffries of AllMusic gave album three and a half stars out of five, saying "This ridiculous kind of irresponsibility is the reason fans signed up in the first place, and when it’s delivered with a scrappy, fresh, sometimes even silly set of beats on the level of Cam’s 2009 album Crime Pays, all the better. Check “Cuffin’,” with special guest Gucci Mane for those loopy hooks Cam just loves, then check “Throw It Up” for the party-time club number done Dipset style. Small complaints include Vado getting lost in the shuffle and the intro's dramatic promises of a “revolution” when everything else is an obvious return to form. In 2010, old is new again in the world of Cam's side-line releases, meaning Heat in Here, Vol. 1 is another fan-aimed success."

== Commercial performance ==
The album debuted at number 133 on the Billboard 200 chart, with first-week sales of 3,700 copies in the United States.

== Track listing ==
No.	Title	Producer(s)	Length
1.	"Intro"	AraabMuzik	3:39
2.	"Like Shit"	AraabMuzik	3:49
3.	"Throw It Up"	AraabMuzik	3:40
4.	"Its Your Party"	AraabMuzik	4:02
5.	"Kill'em" (featuring Young Chris)	AraabMuzik	4:37
6.	"Butta"	AraabMuzik	3:47
7.	"Fuck the Other Side"	AraabMuzik	3:49
8.	"Cuffin'" (featuring Gucci Mane)	AraabMuzik	3:51
9.	"Fed Story"	AraabMuzik	4:52
10.	"Sextape" (featuring Felony Fame)	Skitzo	3:13
11.	"Horror Story"	AraabMuzik	3:29
12.	"On My Shiznit"	AraabMuzik	4:04
13.	"La Bumba"	AraabMuzik	4:21
14.	"Ride with Me"	AraabMuzik	3:44
