= 1st of the Month Vol. 3 =

EP by Cam'ron
- Released: September 1, 2014
- Recorded: 2012–2014
- Genre: Hip hop
- Length: 15:04
- Label: Killa

Cam'ron chronology
1st of the Month Vol. 2 (2014)	1st of the Month Vol. 3 (2014)	1st of the Month Vol. 4 (2014)

1st of the Month Vol. 3 is the third EP by American rapper Cam'ron. The EP was released on September 1, 2014, by Killa Entertainment.

== Background ==
In October 2013, Cam'ron announced that he would release an EP and an episode of his web series every month starting on January 1, 2014. In February 2014, he gave an update on the EP plans, saying: "I got the First of the Month project coming out probably next month. Dame put together the A-Trak collaboration which is called Federal Reserve. me and Smoke DZA got a project going on. It’s like five different projects, basically what we’re doing now is just trying to figure out the timing for everything. It’s probably 150 new songs done." In an April 2014, interview with Mass Appeal, he explained why he decided to release a series of EP's, saying: "Just setting everything up. Music has changed and it’s always fun, but I like to make money while I’m making music, so I just had to figure out a new strategy. Things are changing and if you don’t change with the times you gon get stuck in the past. I’ve been working on this thing called The First of the Month. I’m putting out an EP every month with a 30-minute episode so you’re not waiting a year or more for the next album."

In May 2014, in an interview with MTV News, he spoke about the features on the EP's saying: "The people that’s gonna be on this project is Nicki Minaj, 2 Chainz, Wiz Khalifa, Estelle and Gunplay, so far." He also announced the first EP would be released on July 1, 2014, saying: "The first one is July 1 for the visual, July 3 for the music. And we’ll put it out — the visual — every first of the month. So, August 1 will be another visual, September 1. And then, whatever the first Tuesday is of every month, we’ll be doing the music, as well." On August 20, 2014, the music video was released for "Let the Show Begin" featuring Estelle.

== Critical reception ==
Professional ratings
Review scores
Source	Rating
XXL	(L)

David Inkeles of XXL gave the album an L, saying "For the third installment in Cam’ron’s monthly EP series, the irreverent Harlem MC treats listeners to yet another brief, but memorable, piece of work that manages to touch on an array of subject-matter, ranging from women problems (in case you couldn’t guess, the song is “Dumb Bitch”) to in-depth, autobiographical reflections on some of his career bright spots, as well as mishaps (on “On Top.”). Despite the five-track, 20 minute-or-less formulas Cam has used for these tapes, First of The Month: Vol. 3, much like his last effort, has enough diverse records that stand out on their own, and should help give the project some decent shelf-life."

== Track listing ==
No.	Title	Producer(s)	Length
1.	"Dumb Bitch"		2:28
2.	"Devil" (featuring JuJu)		3:20
3.	"On Top" (featuring Rod Rhaspy)		4:21
4.	"Let the Show Begin" (featuring Estelle)	Couzin Bang	2:27
5.	"Back On Our Bullshit" (featuring Hell Rell)	ADM Beatz	2:27
Total length:			15:04
