= 1st of the Month Vol. 5 =

EP by Cam'ron
- Released: November 1, 2014
- Recorded: 2012–2014
- Genre: Hip hop
- Length: 17:00
- Label: Killa

Cam'ron chronology
1st of the Month Vol. 4 (2014)	1st of the Month Vol. 5 (2014)	1st of the Month Vol. 6 (2014)

Singles from 1st of the Month Vol. 5
- 1. "Touch the Sky" Released: October 22, 2014

1st of the Month Vol. 5 is the fifth EP by American rapper Cam'ron. The EP was released on November 1, 2014, by Killa Entertainment.

== Background ==
In October 2013, Cam'ron announced that he would release an EP and an episode of his web series every month starting on January 1, 2014. In February 2014, he gave an update on the EP plans, saying: "I got the First of the Month project coming out probably next month. Dame put together the A-Trak collaboration which is called Federal Reserve. me and Smoke DZA got a project going on. It’s like five different projects, basically what we’re doing now is just trying to figure out the timing for everything. It’s probably 150 new songs done." In an April 2014, interview with Mass Appeal, he explained why he decided to release a series of EP's, saying: "Just setting everything up. Music has changed and it’s always fun, but I like to make money while I’m making music, so I just had to figure out a new strategy. Things are changing and if you don’t change with the times you gon get stuck in the past. I’ve been working on this thing called The First of the Month. I’m putting out an EP every month with a 30-minute episode so you’re not waiting a year or more for the next album."

In May 2014, in an interview with MTV News, he spoke about the features on the EP's saying: "The people that’s gonna be on this project is Nicki Minaj, 2 Chainz, Wiz Khalifa, Estelle and Gunplay, so far." He also announced the first EP would be released on July 1, 2014, saying: "The first one is July 1 for the visual, July 3 for the music. And we’ll put it out — the visual — every first of the month. So, August 1 will be another visual, September 1. And then, whatever the first Tuesday is of every month, we’ll be doing the music, as well." On October 22, 2014, the EP's first single "Touch the Sky" featuring Wiz Khalifa and Smoke DZA was released. On October 27, 2014, the music video was released for "Touch the Sky" featuring Wiz Khalifa and Smoke DZA.

== Critical reception ==
Professional ratings
Review scores
Source	Rating
XXL	(L)

John Barnes of XXL gave the album an L, saying "First Of The Month Vol. 5 finishes with “Uh Uh Uh Oh” where Cam’ron deviates from the bubblegum aesthetic on the rest of the EP and goes in on a hard-hitting and frantic beat. Perhaps this final track is to let fans know that Cam will fundamentally always still be Killa. The latest EP definitely has its own personality, but sometimes it sounds contrived and underdeveloped compared to the rest of Cam’ron’s catalog. Maybe the pressure of putting out new music frequently is getting to him? Whatever the case, we’ll have to find out next month."

== Track listing ==
No.	Title	Length
1.	"Touch the Sky" (featuring Wiz Khalifa & Smoke DZA)	4:00
2.	"Wonderland" (featuring Hell Rell)	3:00
3.	"Sound Good To U"	4:05
4.	"Bagging Up" (featuring Sen City)	2:44
5.	"Uh Uh Uh Oh"	3:11
