= Crime Pays (Cam'ron album) =

Studio album by Cam'ron
- Released: May 12, 2009
- Recorded: 2008
- Genre: Hip hop
- Length: 73:22
- Label: Diplomats; Asylum; WMGreen
- Producer: Cam'ron (exec.), Skitzo, AraabMuzik, I.N.F.O., NOVA, P Thrillz, YH

Cam'ron chronology
Killa Season (2006)	Crime Pays (2009)	Heat in Here Vol. 1 (2010)

Singles from Crime Pays
- 1. "My Job" Released: January 20, 2009; 2. "Get It in Ohio" Released: March 31, 2009; 3. "Cookies-n-Apple Juice" Released: May 8, 2009

Crime Pays is the sixth studio album by Harlem rapper Cam'ron. The album was released on May 12, 2009, by Diplomat Records and Asylum Records.

== Background ==
My Job, the rapper's first video in two years released to the internet in January 2009, shows a more mature approach to life in an economically struggling America. Though My Job was not intended to be a single, the response to the song was so positive that it was released as a single on March 10, 2009.

XXL Magazine shortly after announced cover of their April issue, due out February 24, which will go more into detail about his status, the 2007 feud with 50 Cent and the status of the once dominating crew The Diplomats. In this interview, Cam'ron stated that the original Diplomats Jim Jones, Juelz Santana, and Freekey Zekey were no longer together.

Miss Info also released an exclusive "Where's Cam'ron?" segment on her website, where the rapper continues to explain many unanswered questions and the future of the MC. Despite the fact that none of the singles charted, the album proved to be successful, charting at #3 on the Billboard 200 selling an estimated 45,000 copies its first week.

== Critical reception ==
Professional ratings
Aggregate scores
Source	Rating
Metacritic	68/100
Review scores
Source	Rating
AllMusic	3.5/5 stars
DJBooth	3.5/5 stars
Entertainment Weekly	B
NOW	4/5 Ns
Pitchfork	5.7/10
PopMatters	4/10 stars
RapReviews	6.5/10
Rolling Stone	3.5/5 stars
Slant Magazine	3/5 stars
Spin	3/5 stars

Crime Pays received positive reviews but music critics found criticism in its length, production and lyrical content. At Metacritic, which assigns a normalized rating out of 100 to reviews from mainstream critics, the album received an average score of 68, based on 13 reviews.

AllMusic editor David Jeffries praised Cam for re-tooling his production and lyrical content to bring back the grit and humor he lost in Killa Season, concluding with, "Add it all up and Crime Pays is just what the fans want, without any sense the man is pandering." Chris Ryan of Spin also praised Cam for delivering material that was reminiscent of his better efforts, concluding that "He may have kept his lyrical gift hidden, but he didn’t lose it." Andrew Rennie of NOW praised the album for containing less featured artists to focus on tight wordplay and sprinklings of topical tracks like "My Job" and "Silky", concluding that, "Cam'ron has evolved on this no-frills release, and it is disarmingly effective."

Entertainment Weekly's Simon Vozick-Levinson and Rolling Stone's Jody Rosen both similarly praised the album for showcasing Cam's knack for lacing typical street tracks with a unique flow and strong wordplay. They concluded by praising the track "My Job" for bringing Cam out of his comfort zone to deliver a serious subject matter. Nathan Slavik of DJBooth found the album a bit lengthy with unnecessary skits and dull tracks but found Cam's lyrical content and choice in party tracks still on-point, saying that "while Crime Pays is far from a perfect album, it is more than enough to serve as a notice to hip-hop: Cam’ron’s back, and he is not to be slept on."

Jesse Cataldo of Slant Magazine was also critical of the needless skits and anonymous brag tracks that border on misogyny but found the production on the same footing with Cam's idiosyncratic wordplay, saying that "forgetting the excess filler, he’s [also] put out a pretty solid album." Ian Cohen from Pitchfork was mixed about the album, finding Cam's usually humorous lyrics and confident flow wasted with production that's more appropriate for a mixtape. He also pointed out that Cam's material was similar to Kool Keith based on the skits, concluding that "In their minds, Cam's done nothing worth really mentioning since 2005, and Crime Pays often makes you wonder if they've got a point." Jordan Sargent of PopMatters criticized the album for lacking the retro-soul beats of Purple Haze that had energy and instead contains lackluster synth production with lyrics that border on self-parody, saying that, "On Crime Pays he swings too far in the opposite direction, coming back with an album that is unadventurous and uninteresting."

== Track listing ==
Crime Pays track listing
No.	Title	Producer(s)	Length
1.	"Crime Pays (Intro)"	Skitzo	2:32
2.	"Cookin' Up"	I.N.F.O., NOVA	4:03
3.	"Where I Know You From"	Skitzo	4:03
4.	"Fuck Cam #1 (skit)"	Skitzo, P Thrillz	1:24
5.	"Never Ever"	Skitzo	3:30
6.	"Curve"	AraabMuzik, Skitzo	3:43
7.	"Silky (No Homo)" (featuring Lady Lodi)	Skitzo	3:20
8.	"Get It in Ohio"	AraabMuzik	4:23
9.	"Who"	Skitzo	3:43
10.	"Grease (skit)"	Skitzo, P Thrillz	2:10
11.	"You Know What's Up" (featuring C.O. and Sky-Lyn)	Skitzo	3:16
12.	"Spend the Night" (featuring Lady Lodi)	AraabMuzik	4:03
13.	"Fuck Cam #2 (skit)"	Skitzo, P Thrillz	1:12
14.	"Woo Hoo" (featuring 40 Cal. and Byrd Lady)	Skitzo	3:50
15.	"Chalupa"	AraabMuzik	4:01
16.	"Cookies-n-Apple Juice" (featuring Byrd Lady and Skitzo)	Skitzo	3:55
17.	"My Job"	Skitzo	3:47
18.	"Homicide"	Skitzo	3:43
19.	"Fuck Cam #3 (skit)"	Skitzo, P Thrillz	0:50
20.	"Got It for Cheap" (featuring Skitzo)	YH	4:11
21.	"Get It Get It" (featuring Skitzo)	Skitzo	3:14
22.	"Bottom of the Pussy"	Skitzo	3:16
23.	"Fuck Cam #4 (skit)"	Skitzo, P Thrillz	1:13
Total length:			73:22

Sample credits

- "Silky (No Homo)" contains a sample from "Groove Me" as performed by King Floyd.
- "Curve" contains a sample from "For You" as performed by Manfred Mann's Earth Band.
- "Spend the Night" contains a sample from "Escape" as performed by Kay Cee.
- "My Job" contains a sample from "Just a Little Misunderstanding" as performed by The Contours.
- "Where I Know You From" contains a sample from "Get Ya Mind Right" as performed by Young Jeezy.

== Personnel ==
Credits for Crime Pays adapted from AllMusic.

- Cam'ron – Executive Producer
- Gregory Davidson – Art Direction, Design, Art Manager
- Chonita Floyd – Marketing
- Lady Lodi – Vocals
- I.N.F.O. – Producer
- Nova – Producer
- Mike Nyte – Mixing
- Phantom – Mastering
- Chris Rascoe – Promotions Coordinator
- Rod Rhaspy – Vocals
- Skitzo – Producer, Engineer
- Sky-Lyn – Vocals
- Shareif Ziyadat – Photography

== Charts ==
=== Weekly charts ===
Chart (2009)	Peak position
US Billboard 200	3
US Top R&B/Hip-Hop Albums (Billboard)	1
US Top Rap Albums (Billboard)	1

=== Year-end charts ===
Chart (2009)	Position
US R&B/Hip-Hop Albums (Billboard)	64
US Top Rap Albums (Billboard)	23

== See also ==
- List of Billboard number-one R&B albums of 2009
- List of number-one rap albums of 2009 (U.S.)
