= Mark McNairy =

American fashion designer

Mark McNairy (born March 8, 1961, in North Carolina) is an American fashion designer. He is currently the designer of mcnairy&co, a menswear brand headquartered in New York City. He is the former creative director for J. Press and Mark McNairy New Amsterdam.

== Career ==
Three styles from the AW09 Mark McNairy Red Brick Soul footwear range.

mcnairy&co is a reinterpretation of McNairy's previous brand "Mark McNairy," with the first collection capturing the same spirit McNairy has long infused in his line. The collection is meant to work together broadly and allows for room to mix and match pieces from the line. mcnairy&co. blends the worlds of sportswear and streetwear, offering styles reminiscent of McNairy's past designs while simultaneously giving a peek into the future of the new brand. The first collection of playful essentials includes graphic tees, hoodies, and sweatpants which feature unique all-over prints, as well as pants dubbed "Droopy Drawers" in corduroy and twill options. Accessories including bucket and trucker hats, socks, and underwear will round out the collection. Upcoming collections will offer a more expansive range of apparel and accessories including tailored wovens, suiting, footwear, and more.

Mark McNairy New Amsterdam was an English and American inspired footwear range as the first component of his eponymous label. The shoes — which are made in Northamptonshire, England — are split into two sections. The first group, called Red Brick Soul, features a selection of dirty bucks, saddle shoes, chukka boots and loafers that all sport the red brick colored sole. Alternatively, the New England Collection features a selection of more formal designs that mix traditional English and American styles in a rather tongue-in-cheek manner. In 2005, McNairy was hired to update the American brand J. Press, by introducing, according to the men's fashion trade publication DNR, an "updated collection of sportswear and tailored clothing."

A J. Press plaid sport coat from the fall collection.

McNairy was hired to the American tailored clothing company Southwick to help reintroduce the Lawrence, Massachusetts, based brand to a new customer. McNairy was tasked with the responsibility to reinvigorate the seventy-nine-year-old brand. During his tenure with Southwick, McNairy worked to add interesting fabrications and detailing into the collection. McNairy also directed the redesign the companies' website with a fresh look to build buzz around the label. McNairy was also instrumental in collaborating with the brand Engineered Garments for their spring/summer 2009 collection.

McNairy has been featured in American publications like The New York Times, GQ, Details, VMan, The Washington Post and many others. McNairy's work has also been featured in Japanese publications such as Men's Ex, Free & Easy and Men's Non-no.

In September 2006, McNairy was quoted in an article from The New York Times Magazine about the growing popularity of Ivy League style and classic American brands like J. Press.

"The young customers we have now are, like, really hip kids," says Mark McNairy, the new design director at J. Press, which has been dressing blue bloods since Theodore Roosevelt was in office. The company deliberately keeps its stuffy shops limited to New Haven; Cambridge, Mass.; New York; and Washington — the better to hook Ivy Leaguers on its blazers and "shaggy dog" wool sweaters before they head off to run the world. However, McNairy has decided not to ignore his more fashion-literate patrons. A recent addition to the J. Press line of icon-emblazoned neckties is one with skulls and crossbones, not a nod to Yale's secret society but a wink to the new customer who has a closet full of ironic T-shirts.

In 2012 McNairy put out a T-shirt design featuring capital bold-faced print "MANIFEST DESTINY". (Manifest destiny was the belief widely held by Anglo-Americans in the 19th century that they were the divinely destined inheritors of the American continent. Thus, the violent colonization of and genocide against Native Americans at the hands of Anglo-Americans was also considered to be "divinely" ordained.)
