= Confessions of Fire =

Studio album by Cam'ron
- Released: July 21, 1998
- Recorded: 1997–1998
- Genre: Hip-hop
- Length: 75:03
- Labels: Untertainment; Epic
- Producers: Swizz Beatz; Darrell "Digga" Branch; Damon Miller; Carl-So-Lowe; Jermaine Dupri; Trackmasters; Daven "Prestige" Vanderpool; Armondo Colon; Daddy-O

Cam'ron chronology
Confessions of Fire (1998)	S.D.E. (2000)

Singles from Confessions of Fire
- 1. "357" Released: June 2, 1998; 2. "Horse & Carriage" Released: June 30, 1998; 3. "Feels Good" Released: December 8, 1998

Confessions of Fire is the debut studio album by American rapper Cam'ron. It was released through Untertainment Records and Epic Records on July 21, 1998. Originally titled "Who Is Cam'ron?" The production on the album was mostly handled by Darrell "Digga" Branch, along with Swizz Beatz, Trackmasters, Jermaine Dupri, and among others. The album also features guest appearances by Mase, Usher, Kelly Price, Noreaga, and more.

Confessions of Fire was supported by three singles: "Horse & Carriage," featuring Mase, "357" and "Feels Good" featuring Usher. The album received generally mixed reviews from music critics and received commercial success. The album debuted and peaked at number six on the US Billboard 200, selling over 107,000 copies in its first week of release and was certified gold by the RIAA with over 500,000 copies sold.

== Singles ==
The album was supported by three singles. The first single, "Horse & Carriage" was released on April 13, 1998. The song features a guest appearance by Mase. It received moderate chart success. On the chart dated August 29, 1998, the single peaked at number 41 on the US Billboard Hot 100 chart, narrowly missing the top 40. In addition, it managed to reach the top ten on the US Hot R&B/Hip-Hop Songs chart, peaking at number nine.

The second single, "357" was released on June 2, 1998. The single missed the Billboard Hot 100 chart. But managed to peaked at number 88 on the US Hot R&B/Hip-Hop Songs chart.

The third single, "Feels Good" was released on December 8, 1998. The single features a guest appearance by Usher. The song also missed the Billboard Hot 100 chart. But managed to peaked at number 54 on the US Hot R&B/Hip-Hop Songs chart.

== Critical reception ==
Professional ratings
Review scores
Source	Rating
AllMusic	3/5 stars
Robert Christgau	(1-star Honorable Mention)
The Source	3.5/5 stars

Confessions of Fire received generally mixed reviews from music critics. Stephen Thomas Erlewine of AllMusic spoke on Cam'ron following in the footsteps of Sean "Puffy" Combs, calling his music polished and melodic while still maintaining the East Coast gangsta aesthetic like Puffy. He also claimed that Cam'ron is a better rapper than Puffy but lacks the pop flair that he's used to create big hits. Erlewine then spoke about Cam'ron potential as a charismatic rapper. Ultimately, he thought Cam'ron showed promise on his debut and managed to create "an accessible fusion of rap and pop that manage to keep some sort of street edge".

== Commercial performance ==
Confessions of Fire debuted at number six on the US Billboard 200 chart, selling 107,000 copies in its first week. This became Cam'ron's first US top-ten debut on the chart. On October 27, 1998, the album was certified gold by the Recording Industry Association of America (RIAA) for sales of over 500,000 copies in the United States.

== Track listing ==
Confessions of Fire track listing
No.	Title	Writer(s)	Producer(s)	Length
1.	"Intro"	Lance Rivera; Cameron Giles; Damon Miller	Damon "Dai" Miller; Lance "Un" Rivera	3:41
2.	"Glory" (featuring Noreaga)	Giles; Kasseem Dean; Jose Luis Gotcha; Miller	Swizz Beatz	4:11
3.	"357"	Giles; Darrell Branch; Mike Post; Pete Carpenter	Darrell "Digga" Branch; Lance "Un" Rivera (co.)	3:26
4.	"Rockin' and Rollin'"	Giles; Jermaine Dupri; William DeVaughn	Jermaine Dupri; Carl So-Lowe	3:30
5.	"Wrong Ones" (featuring Tichina Arnold)	Giles; Branch; Larry Troutman; William Beck	Darrell "Digga" Branch; Lance "Un" Rivera (co.)	4:21
6.	"Death"	Giles; Branch; Sean Combs; Christopher Wallace	Darrell "Digga" Branch; Lance "Un" Rivera (co.)	4:15
7.	"Horse & Carriage" (featuring Mase)	Giles	Tone & Poke	4:03
8.	"Me, My Moms & Jimmy" (featuring Kenny Greene, Jimmy Jones & Fredericka)	Giles; Daven Vanderpool; Tina Weymouth; Chris Frantz; Adrian Belew; Steven Stanley	Daven "Prestige" Vanderpool	3:56
9.	"Prophecy" (featuring Kelly Price)	Sting; Giles	Armando Colon; Lance "Un" Rivera	4:30
10.	"We Got It" (featuring Mase)	Giles; Glenn K. Bolton; Miller	Daddy-O; Damon "Dai" Miller; Lance "Un" Rivera	3:43
11.	"D Rugs" (featuring Brotha)	Giles; Branch; Willie Hutch; Curtis Mayfield; Kenneth Gamble; Leon Huff	Darrell "Digga" Branch; Lance "Un" Rivera (co.)	4:21
12.	"Feels Good" (featuring Usher)	Giles; Branch; Gamble; Huff	Darrell "Digga" Branch; Lance "Un" Rivera (co.)	3:53
13.	"Phone Interlude"		Darrell "Digga" Branch	1:08
14.	"A Pimp's a Pimp" (featuring Jermaine Dupri)	Giles; Branch	Darrell "Digga" Branch; Lance "Un" Rivera (co.)	4:35
15.	"Confessions" (featuring Jacob York)	Giles; Branch	Darrell "Digga" Branch; Lance "Un" Rivera (co.)	5:55
16.	"Fuck You" (featuring Mase)	Giles; Branch; Millie Jackson; Randy Klein	Darrell "Digga" Branch; Lance "Un" Rivera (co.)	2:36
17.	"Me & My Boo" (featuring Charli Baltimore)	Giles; William Robinson; Tiffany Lane; Miller	Damon "Dai" Miller	4:20
18.	"Shanghai"	Giles; Dean	Swizz Beatz	4:22
19.	"Who's Nice"	Giles; Branch	Darrell "Digga" Branch; Lance "Un" Rivera (co.)	4:17
Total length:				75:03

Leftover tracks

- "Pull It" (featuring DMX) (produced by Dame Grease)

Sample credits

- "357" contains a sample of "Magnum P.I. Theme" by Mike Post.
- "A Pimp's A Pimp" contains a sample of "Don't Turn the Lights Off" by The Originals.
- "D Rugs" contains a sample of "Mother's Theme (Mama)" by Willie Hutch and "I'm Your Pusherman" by Curtis Mayfield.
- "Feels Good" contains a sample of "When Somebody Loves You Back" by Teddy Pendergrass.
- "Fuck You" contains a sample of "Phuck U Symphony" by Millie Jackson.
- "Me & My Boo" contains a sample of "Being With You" by Smokey Robinson.
- "Prophecy" contains a sample of "Fragile" by Sting.
- "Me, My Moms & Jimmy" contains samples of "Genius Of Love" by Tom Tom Club and "Mama Used to Say" by Junior.
- "Wrong Ones" contains a sample of "As We Lay" by Shirley Murdock.
- "Horse & Carriage" contains samples of "Cuban Cabby" by Desi Arnaz and "Who Is He (And What Is He to You)?" by Bill Withers.
- "Death" contains a sample of "Suicidal Thoughts" by The Notorious B.I.G.
- "We Got it" contains a sample of "Say What" by Idris Muhammad

== Charts ==
Chart (1998)	Peak position
US Billboard 200	6
US Top R&B/Hip-Hop Albums (Billboard)	2

== Certifications ==
Region	Certification	Certified units/sales
United States (RIAA)	Gold	500,000^{^}
^{^} Shipments figures based on certification alone.
