= S.D.E. =

Studio album by Cam'ron
- Released: September 19, 2000
- Recorded: 1999
- Genre: Hip hop
- Length: 70:37
- Labels: Untertainment; Epic
- Producers: Cam'ron; Darrell "Digga" Branch; Lance "Un" Rivera; Trackmasters; Ron G; Armando Colon, Dame Grease

Cam'ron chronology
Confessions of Fire (1998)	S.D.E. (2000)	Come Home with Me (2002)

Professional ratings
Review scores
Source	Rating
AllMusic	3/5 stars
Los Angeles Times	3/4 stars
The Source	3.5/5 stars

S.D.E. (Sports, Drugs & Entertainment) is the second studio album by Harlem rapper Cam'ron. The album was originally titled The Rough, Rough, Rough Album and was set for a 1999 release, however the project was pushed back to 2000 and many new songs were recorded. The album was finally released on September 19, 2000, by Untertainment Records and Epic Records. It features guest appearances from Destiny's Child, Noreaga, Dutch & Spade, Ol' Dirty Bastard, Prodigy, Freekey Zekey, Juelz Santana, and Jim Jones. The album debuted and peaked at number 14 on the Billboard 200, selling 73,000 copies in its first week. There's a remix of the song "What Means The World To You" which features Ludacris, Trina, UGK and Juelz Santana.

== Track listing ==
S.D.E. track listing
No.	Title	Writer(s)	Producer(s)	Length
1.	"Fuck You"	Cameron Giles; Darrell Branch; Millie Jackson; Randy Klein	Darrell "Digga" Branch; Lance "Un" Rivera (co.)	1:17
2.	"That's Me" (featuring Keisha "Honey" Cargill)	Giles; Edward Hinson Jr.	Self	4:38
3.	"Whatever"	Giles; Branch	Darrell "Digga" Branch	3:36
4.	"Do It Again" (featuring Destiny's Child & Jimmy Jones)	Giles; Beyoncé Knowles; Joseph Jones; Branch	Darrell "Digga" Branch	4:07
5.	"Come Kill Me"	Giles; Branch	Darrell "Digga" Branch	4:20
6.	"What I Gotta Live For"	Giles; Branch	Darrell "Digga" Branch	3:23
7.	"Violence" (featuring Ol' Dirty Bastard)	Giles; Russell Jones; Branch	Darrell "Digga" Branch	3:35
8.	"Skit"			1:26
9.	"Freak"	Giles; Samuel Barnes; Jean-Claude Olivier; Larry Gates	Tone & Poke; Precision	3:22
10.	"Double Up" (featuring Juelz)	Giles; LaRon James; Branch	Darrell "Digga" Branch	4:22
11.	"Losin' Weight" (featuring Prodigy)	Giles; Albert Johnson; Branch; Joseph Jefferson; Charles Simmons; Richard Roebuck	Darrell "Digga" Branch	3:54
12.	"Sports, Drugs & Entertainment"	Giles; Ronald Bowser; Leon Haywood; Marshall McQueen; Bill Williams; Darnell Scott; Christopher Wallace	Ron G	4:16
13.	"What Means the World to You" (featuring Yameeka "Keema" Purcell)	Sting	Armando Colon	4:39
14.	"All the Chickens"	Giles; Hinson Jr.	Self	4:01
15.	"Fuck You At" (featuring Noreaga)	Giles; Victor Santiago; Branch	Darrell "Digga" Branch	4:05
16.	"Why No" (featuring Jimmy Jones & Freekey Zekey)	Giles; J. Jones; Ezekiel Jiles; Branch	Darrell "Digga" Branch	3:52
17.	"Where I'm From" (featuring Dutch & Spade)	Giles; Branch	Darrell "Digga" Branch	3:34
18.	"Let Me Know"	Giles; Branch	Darrell "Digga" Branch	4:14
19.	"My Hood"	Giles; Damon Blackman; Barrett Strong; Norman Whitfield	Grease	3:56
Total length:				70:37

Japan bonus tracks
No.	Title	Writer(s)	Producer(s)	Length
20.	"What My Niggas Want" (featuring Busta Rhymes)	Giles; Branch; Trevor Smith, Jr.	Darrell "Digga" Branch; Lance 'Un' Rivera (co.)	2:53
21.	"Teflon Hitz" (featuring Juelz)	Giles; James; Branch	Darrell "Digga" Branch	3:59
Total length:				77:29

Leftover Tracks

- "I Don't Like You" (featuring Charli Baltimore)
- "It's Too Late"
- "Wanna Be a Hustla"

Samples

- "Let Me Know" contains a sample of "Heavy Action" by Johnny Pearson.
- "What Means the World to You" contains a sample of "Roxanne" by The Police.
- "My Hood" interpolates The Temptations' cover of Edwin Starr's song "War".
- "Sports, Drugs & Entertainment" contains samples of "That Sweet Woman of Mine" by Leon Haywood and "Things Done Changed" by The Notorious B.I.G.
- "Double Up" contains a sample of "Destination Mood" by Norman Connors.
- "Losin' Weight" contains a sample of "Don't Leave Me Out Along the Road" by Teddy Pendergrass.
- "Fuck You" contains a sample of "Phuck U Symphony" by Millie Jackson.

== Charts ==
Chart (2000)	Peak position
US Billboard 200	14
US Top R&B/Hip-Hop Albums (Billboard)	2
