= 1st of the Month Vol. 4 =

EP by Cam'ron
- Released: October 1, 2014
- Recorded: 2012–2014
- Genre: Hip hop
- Length: 15:20
- Label: Killa

Cam'ron chronology
1st of the Month Vol. 3 (2014)	1st of the Month Vol. 4 (2014)	1st of the Month Vol. 5 (2014)

Singles from 1st of the Month Vol. 4
- 1. "Snapped" Released: September 17, 2014

1st of the Month Vol. 4 is the fourth EP by American rapper Cam'ron. The EP was released on October 1, 2014, by Killa Entertainment.

== Background ==
In October 2013, Cam'ron announced that he would release an EP and an episode of his web series every month starting on January 1, 2014. In February 2014, he gave an update on the EP plans, saying: "I got the First of the Month project coming out probably next month. Dame put together the A-Trak collaboration which is called Federal Reserve. me and Smoke DZA got a project going on. It’s like five different projects, basically what we’re doing now is just trying to figure out the timing for everything. It’s probably 150 new songs done." In an April 2014, interview with Mass Appeal, he explained why he decided to release a series of EP's, saying: "Just setting everything up. Music has changed and it’s always fun, but I like to make money while I’m making music, so I just had to figure out a new strategy. Things are changing and if you don’t change with the times you gon get stuck in the past. I’ve been working on this thing called The First of the Month. I’m putting out an EP every month with a 30-minute episode so you’re not waiting a year or more for the next album."

In May 2014, in an interview with MTV News, he spoke about the features on the EP's saying: "The people that’s gonna be on this project is Nicki Minaj, 2 Chainz, Wiz Khalifa, Estelle and Gunplay, so far." He also announced the first EP would be released on July 1, 2014, saying: "The first one is July 1 for the visual, July 3 for the music. And we’ll put it out — the visual — every first of the month. So, August 1 will be another visual, September 1. And then, whatever the first Tuesday is of every month, we’ll be doing the music, as well." On September 17, 2014, the EP's first single "Snapped" featuring 2 Chainz was released. On September 22, 2014, the music video was released for "Snapped" featuring 2 Chainz.

== Critical reception ==
Professional ratings
Review scores
Source	Rating
XXL	(XL)

Darryl Robertson of XXL gave the album an XL, saying "While the first half of the EP holds up, the second doesn’t deliver. “Baby Ain’t Mine” and “F*ckin’ Hater” find Cam making lackluster attempts at singing about his dislike for women. If “Dumb Bitch” from Vol. 3 wasn't enough of him talking crazy, these should be added to the growing list of songs. The problem lies that these aren't on par to what fans have heard in the past. 1st Of The Month, Vol. 4 concludes with the bass knocking track “3rd Floor Flow,” which finds Cam getting down and dirty like the Harlem streets during Alpo and Rich Porter days. It's an excellent conclusion to Vol.4, despite the EP's minor mishaps. Just like the previous installments, the project leaves fans wanting more from the Dipset honcho. Until next month."

== Track listing ==
No.	Title	Length
1.	"Killa's Cry"	2:02
2.	"Snapped" (featuring 2 Chainz)	3:00
3.	"Baby Ain't Mine"	3:41
4.	"Fuckin' Hater"	3:26
5.	"3rd Floor Flow"	3:10
