= 1st of the Month Vol. 2 =

EP by Cam'ron
- Released: August 1, 2014
- Recorded: 2011–2014
- Genre: Hip hop
- Length: 15:34
- Label: Killa

Cam'ron chronology
1st of the Month Vol. 1 (2014)	1st of the Month Vol. 2 (2014)	1st of the Month Vol. 3 (2014)

Singles from 1st of the Month Vol. 2
- 1. "So Bad" Released: July 15, 2014

1st of the Month Vol. 2 is the second EP by American rapper Cam'ron. The EP was released on August 1, 2014, by Killa Entertainment. The EP features guest appearances from Nicki Minaj, Rod Rhaspy, Yummy Bingham, Jim Jones, and Hell Rell.

== Background ==
In October 2013, Cam'ron announced that he would release an EP and an episode of his web series every month starting on January 1, 2014. In February 2014, he gave an update on the EP plans, saying: "I got the First of the Month project coming out probably next month. Dame put together the A-Trak collaboration which is called Federal Reserve. me and Smoke DZA got a project going on. It’s like five different projects, basically what we’re doing now is just trying to figure out the timing for everything. It’s probably 150 new songs done." In an April 2014, interview with Mass Appeal, he explained why he decided to release a series of EPs, saying: "Just setting everything up. Music has changed and it’s always fun, but I like to make money while I’m making music, so I just had to figure out a new strategy. Things are changing and if you don’t change with the times you gon get stuck in the past. I’ve been working on this thing called The First of the Month. I’m putting out an EP every month with a 30-minute episode so you’re not waiting a year or more for the next album."

In May 2014, in an interview with MTV News, he spoke about the features on the EPs, saying: "The people that’s gonna be on this project is Nicki Minaj, 2 Chainz, Wiz Khalifa, Estelle and Gunplay, so far." He also announced the first EP would be released on July 1, 2014, saying: "The first one is July 1 for the visual, July 3 for the music. And we’ll put it out — the visual — every first of the month. So, August 1 will be another visual, September 1. And then, whatever the first Tuesday is of every month, we’ll be doing the music, as well." On July 15, 2014, the EP's first single "So Bad" featuring Nicki Minaj and Yummy Bingham was released. On the same day, the music video was released for "So Bad". On August 7, 2014, the music video was released for "C.F.W.U. (Cantfuckwithus)" featuring Jim Jones and Hell Rell. On August 15, 2014, the music video was released for "Sweetest".

== Critical reception ==
Professional ratings
Review scores
Source	Rating
HipHopDX	3.5/5 stars
XXL	(XL)

1st of the Month Vol. 2 was met with generally positive reviews from music critics. David Inkeles of XXL gave the album an XL, saying "1st of the Month, Vol. 2 is a true-to-form gem, and a nod to Cam’s early aught brilliance. It gives listeners a dose of an artist they might have thought they’d lost, or at least conceded to the laurels of an incredibly successful career. But even at its most single/radio-reaching moments, like on the Nicki Minaj-assisted “So Bad,” Vol. 2 feels and sounds like the Cam’ron we know and love. It is one of the most surprisingly great things you’ll hear all summer." Steven Goldstein of HipHopDX gave the album three and a half stars out of five, saying "1st Of The Month, Vol. 2 exceeds in allowing Cam’ron to flex range without ever looking too out of place, and serves as a medium for both somber reflection and self-indulgent celebration. If nothing else, the EP is a worthy refresher from one of Hip Hop’s most unusual personalities, and a teaser of what could come on projects with Dipset and A-Trak."

== Track listing ==
No.	Title	Producer(s)	Length
1.	"Sweetest" (featuring Rod Rhaspy)		3:02
2.	"Lala"		2:51
3.	"Soulplane"		3:19
4.	"So Bad" (featuring Nicki Minaj & Yummy Bingham)	Kuya Productions	3:24
5.	"C.F.W.U. (Cantfuckwithus)" (featuring Jim Jones & Hell Rell)	AraabMuzik	2:58
Total length:			15:34
