= Gunz n' Butta =

Studio album by Cam'ron & Vado
- Released: April 19, 2011
- Genre: Hip hop
- Length: 58:50
- Label: Diplomatic Man; eOne
- Producer: AraabMuzik; Antonio Jimenez; Sire; Puma; Skitzo; Buttah Beatz

Cam'ron chronology
Heat in Here Vol. 1 (2010)	Gunz n' Butta (2011)	1st of the Month Vol. 1 (2014)

Singles from Gunz n' Butta
- 1. "Speaking In Tungs" Released: June 23, 2010; 2. "We All Up In Here" Released: December 17, 2010; 3. "Hey Muma" Released: March 22, 2011

Gunz n' Butta is the second studio album by Harlem hip hop duo the U.N., which is composed of Cam'ron and Vado. It was released on April 19, 2011, under Diplomat Records and eOne Music. The album was supported by the singles "Speaking In Tungs", "We All Up In Here" and "Hey Muma".

== Singles ==
On June 23, 2010, the album's first single "Speaking In Tungs" was released. On August 2, 2010, the music video was released for "Speaking In Tungs". On December 17, 2010, the album's second single "We All Up In Here" was released. On March 22, 2011, the album's third single "Hey Muma" was released. On April 26, 2011, the music video was released for "Hey Muma".

== Critical response ==
Professional ratings
Aggregate scores
Source	Rating
Metacritic	72/100
Review scores
Source	Rating
AllMusic	3.5/5 stars
HipHopDX	2.5/5 stars
The New York Times	(positive)
Pitchfork (website)]]	7.6/10
Spin	7/10

Gunz n' Butta was met with generally positive reviews from music critics. At Metacritic, which assigns a normalized rating out of 100 to reviews from critics, the album received an average score of 72, which indicates "generally favorable reviews", based on 5 reviews. David Jeffries of AllMusic gave the album three and a half stars out of five, saying "For returning Cam'ron and Diplomats fans who don't mind a little bumpy with their ride, Gunz n' Butta is the casual collaboration album done right. That's really saying something, since this collection of mixtape tracks and new numbers was originally promised as the inaugural release of Killa Cam's post-Diplomats crew, the U.N., but last man standing Vado is a true asset and this final product still hits hard." Sean Ryon of HipHopDX gave the album two and a half stars out of five, saying "Gunz N Butta has all the makings of a classic Dipset banger, but like many of Cam'ron's albums, suffers from a lack of both direction and editing. Although Flea and Slime more than prove their worth as two of New York's top Hip Hop acts, Gunz N Butta's shortcomings make the project feel more like a run-of-the-mill mixtape than a cohesive retail release."

Tom Breihan of Pitchfork gave the album a 7.6 out of 10, saying "There's nothing even the slightest bit innovative about Gunz n' Butta, but it does give us Cam, Vado, and Araab, three guys with great chemistry, doing what they do. It's a one-dimensional affair, but that one dimension is pretty awesome." Ben Detrick of Spin gave the album a seven out of ten, saying "On Gunz N' Butta, Cam'ron and protégé Vado (a rapper with Gatling-gun nuance) are roiling and abrasive, twisting down a wormhole of multisyllabic rhymes and Araabmuzik's skittering beats."

== Commercial performance ==
The album debuted at number 78 on the Billboard 200 chart, with first-week sales of 7,500 copies in the United States.

== Track listing ==
No.	Title	Producer(s)	Length
1.	"Killa"	AraabMuzik	3:18
2.	"American Greed"	AraabMuzik	3:53
3.	"Heat In Here"	AraabMuzik	2:31
4.	"Face-Off"	AraabMuzik	4:08
5.	"I-Luv U"	AraabMuzik	4:14
6.	"Put a Bird Up"	AraabMuzik	3:24
7.	"Monster Muzik"	AraabMuzik	3:59
8.	"Breathe"	Antonio Jimenez	4:53
9.	"Fuck-a-Freestyle"	Antonio Jimenez	4:24
10.	"Lights, Camera, Action" (featuring Skylynn)	AraabMuzik	3:09
11.	"Stop It 5"	AraabMuzik	4:46
12.	"Speaking In Tungs"	Sire, Puma	2:38
13.	"Hey Muma"	Skitzo	3:11
14.	"We All Up in Here"	AraabMuzik	3:31
15.	"They Don't Like You"	AraabMuzik	3:41
16.	"Be with Me"	Buttah Beatz	3:10

Best Buy bonus tracks
No.	Title	Length
17.	"Different Clothes"
18.	"Me And You"
19.	"Round The Clock"

== Charts ==
Chart (2011)	Peak position
US Billboard 200	78
US Top R&B/Hip-Hop Albums (Billboard)	15
US Independent Albums (Billboard)	10
