= Purple Haze (album) =

2004 studio album by Cam'ron

Studio album by Cam'ron
- Released: December 7, 2004
- Recorded: 2003–2004
- Genre: Hip hop; East Coast hip-hop; chipmunk soul
- Length: 77:47
- Label: Diplomat; Roc-A-Fella; Island Def Jam
- Producer: Damon Dash (exec.); Kareem "Biggs" Burke (exec.); Skitzo; The Heatmakerz; Chad Hamilton; Nasty Beat Makers; Kanye West; Brian "All Day" Miller; Ty-Tracks; Charlemagne; Pop & Versatile; Stay Getting Productions; Bang; The Legendary Traxster; Self Service; Music Mystro; Amadeus

Cam'ron chronology
Come Home with Me (2002)	Purple Haze (2004)	Killa Season (2006)

Singles from Purple Haze
- 1. "Get Em Girls" Released: November 4, 2003; 2. "Lord You Know" Released: February 10, 2004; 3. "Hey Lady" Released: September 10, 2004; 4. "Girls" Released: December 1, 2004; 5. "Down and Out" Released: January 11, 2005

Purple Haze is the fourth studio album by Harlem rapper Cam'ron. The album was released on December 7, 2004, by Diplomat Records, Roc-A-Fella Records and distributed by The Island Def Jam Music Group.

== Background ==
The release of Purple Haze was delayed several times from its original November 2003 schedule, with the first single “Get Em Girls” dropping a year before the album eventually arrived. By the time of its release in December 2004, Roc-A-Fella Records was undergoing major restructuring, including its sale to Def Jam the day of its release and Jay-Z’s appointment as president and CEO of Def Jam. Around the same period, Roc-A-Fella co-founders Damon Dash and Kareem “Biggs” Burke were effectively pushed out, deepening internal instability at the label. Combined with existing tension between Cam’ron and Jay-Z, these factors contributed to a fractured rollout and limited promotional support. Following the album’s release, Cam’ron sought to leave Roc-A-Fella and Def Jam, making Purple Haze his final album under both labels.

== Commercial performance ==
The album debuted and peaked at number 20 on the Billboard 200 with 123,000 copies sold in its first week. The album has since been certified Gold by the Recording Industry Association of America (RIAA) for shipments and sales of over 500,000 copies in America.

== Critical reception ==
Professional ratings
Aggregate scores
Source	Rating
Metacritic	72/100
Review scores
Source	Rating
AllMusic	2.5/5 stars
Blender	4/5 stars
Entertainment Weekly	B+
NME	8/10
Pitchfork	8.7/10
Spin	B+
Stylus Magazine	B+

Purple Haze received generally positive reviews from music critics. At Metacritic, which assigns a normalized rating out of 100 to reviews from mainstream critics, the album received an average score of 72, based on 7 reviews.

David Drake of Stylus Magazine praised the album for its "bombastic production and surreal lyricism" and Cam's "unique brand of idiosyncratic gangsta" being wildly engaging because of his absurd, poker-faced delivery, concluding that "Purple Haze is such a twisted take on gangsta that it has to be heard to be believed." Blender contributor Jonah Weiner noted how the production throughout the record moves between "aggressively insane ("Shake")" to "ador[ing] pop (the Cyndi Lauper-interpolating "Girls Just Want to Have Fun")" while Cam matches that balance with wordplay that's "Missy gibberish swathed in 50 Cent menace," concluding that he "writes pop hooks and avant-garde rhymes while staying as close to the streets as a manhole cover." Chris Ryan from Spin gave credit to Cam for tightening his signature flow, choosing quality and risk-worthy beats, and maintaining listener interest while delivering "Harlem symbolism and non-sensical muttering" throughout the album. AllMusic editor Andy Kellman was mixed about the tracks on the record, finding "Girls" and "Harlem Streets" to be weak inclusions but praised the contributions from Kanye West ("Down and Out"), Pop & Versatile ("Soap Opera") and the Heatmakerz ("More Gangsta Music"). He also commented that the "Diplomat-affiliated material" being released alongside it that year may cause their fanbase to suffer burnout from too much content. Nathan Rabin of The A.V. Club commended the album for adopting the hyper-soul style of Roc-A-Fella's sound throughout the track listing but criticized Cam's lyric delivery for being similar to nursery rhymes, saying that it "lumbers drearily through a sea of gangsta-rap clichés."

Online music magazine Pitchfork placed Purple Haze at number 114 on their list of the Top 200 Albums of the 2000s. Pitchfork writer Sean Fennessey said, "Call this a personal project for a relentlessly distant artist; an asshole's lament. Purple Haze is simultaneously a refined, perfectly A&R-ed follow-up and one of the most confusing, crude full-lengths ever." In 2022, Rolling Stone placed it at number 174 on their list of the 200 Greatest Hip-Hop Albums of All Time. The magazine's writer Joe Gross said, "Purple Haze was the peak of classic-era Cam, somehow shoring up his delivery and getting weirder for it."

== Track listing ==
Purple Haze track listing
No.	Title	Writer(s)	Producer(s)	Length
1.	"Intro"	Cameron Giles; Dario Rodriguez	Skitzo	2:10
2.	"More Gangsta Music" (featuring Juelz Santana)	Giles; Gregory Green; Sean Thomas; LaRon James; Migel Collins; Paul A. Henton; Dave Richards; Bobby "Digital" Dixon	The Heatmakerz	4:26
3.	"Get Down"	Giles; Chad Hamilton; Marvin Gaye; Ivy Hunter	Chad Hamilton	2:37
4.	"Welcome to Purple Haze" (skit)	Giles	Cam'ron	1:15
5.	"Killa Cam"	Giles; Green; Thomas	The Heatmakerz	4:24
6.	"Leave Me Alone, Pt. 2"	Giles; Johnny David Mollings; Leonardo V. Mollings; Jerry Goldsmith	Nasty Beat Makers	4:02
7.	"Down and Out" (featuring Kanye West and Syleena Johnson)	Giles; Kanye West; Fred Briggs	Brian "All Day" Miller; Kanye West	4:08
8.	"Harlem Streets"	Giles; Ty Caldwell; Mike Post	Ty-Tracks	3:41
9.	"Rude Boy" (skit)	Giles	Cam'ron	1:28
10.	"Girls" (featuring Mona Lisa)	Giles; Henri Charlemagne; Robert Hazard	Charlemagne	3:43
11.	"I'm a Chicken Head" (skit)	Giles	Cam'ron	1:26
12.	"Soap Opera"	Giles; Victor Babb; Frank Visosky; William "Smokey" Robinson	Pop & Versatile	4:10
13.	"O.T." (skit)	Giles	Cam'ron	0:24
14.	"Bubble Music"	Giles; Mike Miller; Lawrence Simpson; David Hinds	Stay Gettin' Productions	3:51
15.	"More Reasons" (featuring Jaheim)	Giles; Hamilton; Ryan Presson; Jaheim Hoagland; Maurice White; Philip Bailey; Charles Stepney	Hamilton	4:30
16.	"The Block" (skit)	Giles	Cam'ron	0:46
17.	"The Dope Man" (featuring Jim Jones)	Giles; Dwayne Holmes; Jim Jones; Leroy "Sugarfoot" Bonner; Marshall "Rock" Jones; Ralph "Pee Wee" Middlebrooks; Walter "Junie" Morrison; Bruce Napier; Andrew Noland; Marvin "Merv" Pierce; Greg Webster	Bang	3:26
18.	"Family Ties" (featuring Nicole Wray)	Giles; Rodriguez; Nicole Wray	Skitzo	4:17
19.	"Adrenaline" (featuring Twista and Psycho Drama)	Giles; Samuel Lindley; Carl Mitchell; Jeffrey Robinson	The Legendary Traxster	4:39
20.	"Hey Lady" (featuring Freekey Zekey)	Giles; Ezekiel Jiles; Babb; Visosky; Larry Troutman; Roger Troutman	Pop & Versatile	3:07
21.	"Shake" (featuring J.R. Writer)	Giles; Edward Hinson; Juan Rusty Brito	Self Service; Music Mystro	3:28
22.	"Get 'Em Girls"	Giles; Rodriguez	Skitzo	4:23
23.	"Dip-Set Forever"	Giles; West; Lamont Dozier; Freddie Gorman; Brian Holland	Brian "All Day" Miller; Kanye West	3:54
24.	"Take 'Em to Church" (featuring Juelz Santana and Un Kasa)	Giles; Antwan Thompson; James; Antonio Wilder	Amadeus	3:48
Total length:				77:47

Leftover Tracks

- "Lord You Know" (featuring Jaheim)
- "Royalty (Crown Me)" (featuring T.I. and Juelz Santana)
- "Bust Ya Gunz" (featuring Lil' Flip)
- "Halftime Show"
- "Dead Muthafuckas" (featuring Juelz Santana)
- "Diamonds and Pearls"
- "Shut the Fuck Up"
- "Bigger Picture" (featuring Juelz Santana)
- "He’s a Homo (Phone Interlude)"
- "Purple Haze"
- "Yeo"
- "To the Top"

Sample credits

- "More Gangsta Music" contains a sample of "Woman I Need You" by Sizzla.
- "Get Down" contains a sample of "Life's Opera" by Marvin Gaye.
- "Leave Me Alone Pt. 2" contains a sample of "Bajo Fuego" by Jerry Goldsmith.
- "Down And Out" contains a sample of "Strung Out" by William Bell & Mavis Staples.
- "Harlem Streets" contains a sample of "Theme from Hill Street Blues" by Mike Post.
- "Girls" contains a sample of "Girls Just Want to Have Fun" by Cyndi Lauper.
- "Soap Opera" contains a sample of "Merry-Go-Ride" by Smokey Robinson.
- "Bubble Music" contains a sample of "Blues Dance Raid" by Steel Pulse.
- "More Reasons" contains a sample of "Reasons" by Earth, Wind & Fire.
- "The Dope Man" contains a sample of "Funky Worm" by Ohio Players.
- "Hey Lady" contains a sample of "I Want to Be Your Man" by Roger Troutman.
- "Get 'Em Girls" contains a sample of "Carmina Burana - O Fortuna" by Carl Orff.
- "Dip-Set Forever" contains a sample of "Forever" by Chuck Cissel.

== Personnel ==
Credits for Purple Haze adapted from AllMusic.

- Cam'ron – executive producer
- Kareem "Biggs" Burke – executive producer
- Traxster – mixing
- Tony Dawsey – mastering
- Bang – producer
- Carlisle Young – mixing
- Charlemagne – producer
- Eric "Ebo" Butler – mixing
- Cam'ron – producer
- Oluwaseye Olusa – photography
- Kanye West – producer
- Chad Hamilton – producer
- Traxster – producer
- The Heatmakerz – producer
- Versatile – producer
- Skitzo – producer
- Ryan Press – producer
- Duke Dagod – A&R
- Nasty Beatmakers – producer
- Stay Gettin' productions – producer
- Robert Sims – art direction
- Antwan "Amadeus" Thompson – producer
- Travis Cummings – artist coordination
- Ty Tracks – producer
- Jamel George – artist coordination
- Monica Morrow – stylist
- Shalik Berry – artist coordination
- Mike Peters – vocals
- Rick Patrick – creative director
- Jim Jones – vocals
- Juelz Santana – vocals
- Mike T. – engineer
- Jaconda "Ms" Blunt – vocals
- Carlisle Young – engineer
- Latrice "Grease" Carter – vocals
- Eric "Ebo" Butler – engineer
- Sarah Hinds – vocals
- Mike Peters – engineer
- Steven "Opera Steve" Santiago – vocals
- Milwaukee "Protools King" Buck – engineer
- Dave Irving – vocals
- Damon Dash – executive producer

== Charts and certifications ==
=== Weekly charts ===
Chart (2004)	Peak position
US Billboard 200	20
US Top R&B/Hip-Hop Albums (Billboard)	4

=== Year-end charts ===
Chart (2005)	Position
US Billboard 200	165
US Top R&B/Hip-Hop Albums (Billboard)	33

=== Certifications ===
Region	Certification	Certified units/sales
United States (RIAA)	Gold	500,000^{^}
^{^} Shipments figures based on certification alone.
