= U.N. (hip-hop group) =

American hip hop group

- Also known as: Us Now
- Origin: New York City, U.S.
- Genres: Hip-hop
- Years active: 2009–2012, 2019–present
- Labels: Diplomatic Man; Virgin Records; E1; Interscope; Asylum
- Members: Vado; Cam'ron

U.N. is a Harlem, New York City–based hip-hop duo formed by Cam'ron and Vado in 2009 after Cam'ron had a falling-out with Jim Jones in 2007.

The duo released the mixtape Boss of All Bosses in 2009, followed by its sequel Boss of All Bosses 2 the following year. Afterwards, the U.N. released Boss of All Bosses 2.5, an expansion of the first two original mixtapes, released on May 12, 2010. The duo's debut album, Heat in Here Vol. 1 was released later that same month, through Asylum Records and Warner Records. It reached number 133 on the Billboard 200, and contained guest appearances from rappers Young Chris, Gucci Mane and Felony Fame. A sequel, Gunz n' Butta was released in April 2011 independently through Diplomatic Man and Entertainment One; it performed slightly better commercially at number 77 on the Billboard 200. It spawned the singles "Speakin' in Tungs", which peaked at number 82 on Billboard's Hip-Hop/R&B Songs chart, as well as the similarly received "Hey Muma".

Cam'ron has since temporarily made amends with Jones in 2010 and renewed focus on his solo career, while Vado briefly signed with DJ Khaled's We the Best Music Group to pursue a solo career.

They reunited in 2019.

== Discography ==
=== Studio albums ===
Year	Title	Chart positions			Sales
Year	Title	U.S.	U.S. R&B	U.S. Rap	Sales
2010	Heat in Here Vol. 1: Released: May 25, 2010; Label: Diplomat	146	30	16	
2011	Gunz n' Butta (as Cam'ron & Vado): Released: April 19, 2011; Label: Diplomat	78	15	7	16,591

=== Singles ===
Year	Title	Chart positions			Album
Year	Title	U.S.	U.S. R&B	U.S. Rap	Album
2010	"Speaking in Tungs"	—	82	—	Slime Flu and Gunz n' Butta
2011	"Hey Muma"	—	84	—	Gunz n' Butta
