= Cam'ron =

American rapper (born 1976)

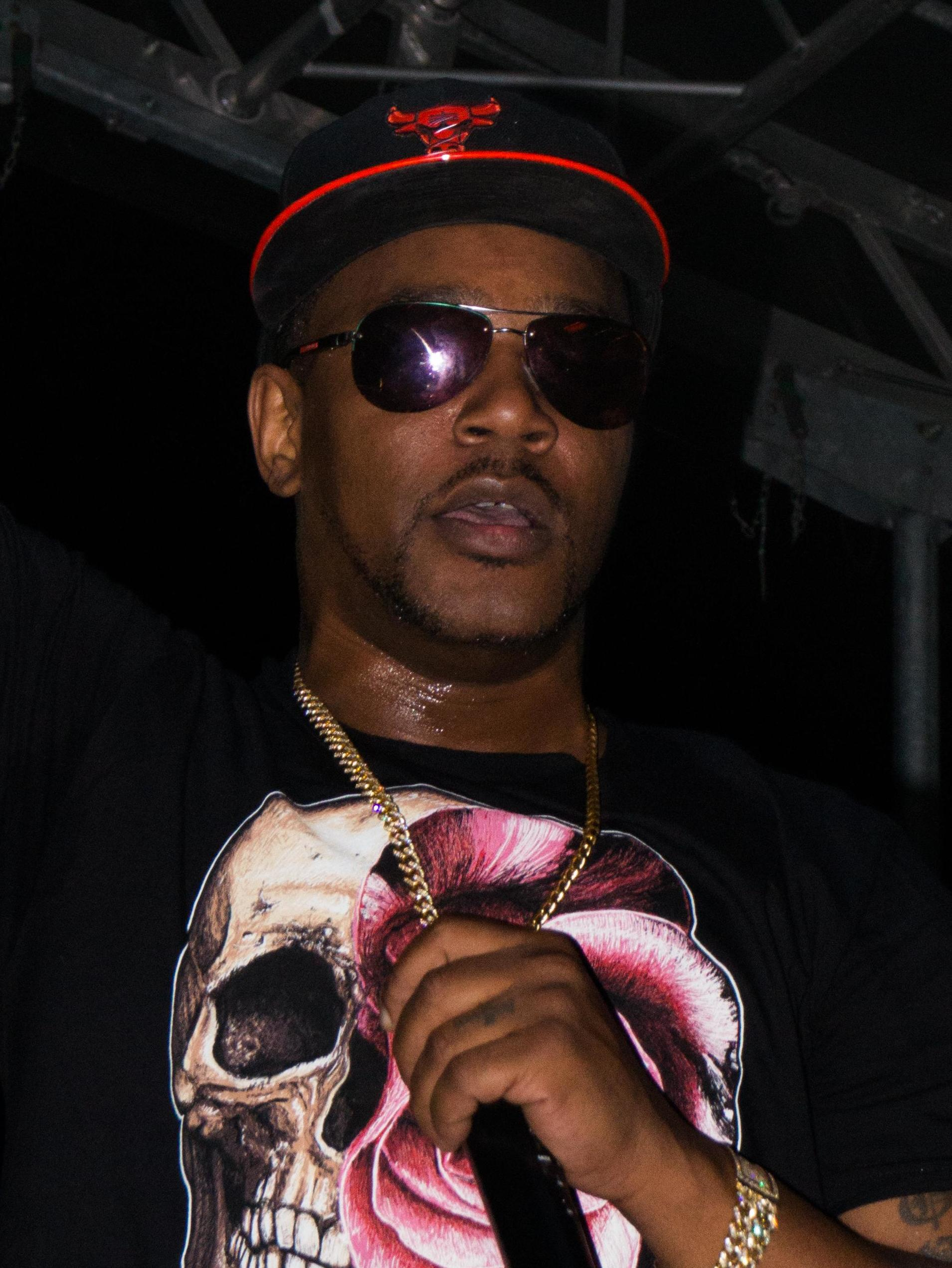
- Cam'ron performing in 2014

Background information
- Also known as: Killa Cam
- Born: Cameron Giles; February 4, 1976 (age 50); Manhattan, New York City, U.S.
- Genres: Hip-hop; East Coast hip-hop; gangsta rap
- Occupations: Rapper; songwriter; actor; record executive; entrepreneur; sports analyst
- Works: Cam'ron discography
- Years active: 1994–present
- Labels: Crime Wave (current); Killa; Cinematic (former); Diplomat; Virgin; E1; Asylum; Roc-A-Fella (former); Def Jam (former); Epic; Untertainment; Sony (former)
- Member of: Children of the Corn; U.N.
- Formerly of: The Diplomats
- Website: purplehaze2.com

Cameron Giles (born February 4, 1976), known mononymously as Cam'ron, is an American rapper. Beginning his career in the early 1990s as Killa Cam, Giles signed with Lance "Un" Rivera's Untertainment, an imprint of Epic Records to release his first two studio albums Confessions of Fire (1998) and S.D.E. (Sports Drugs & Entertainment) (2000); the former received gold certification by the RIAA. After leaving Epic, Giles signed with Roc-A-Fella Records in 2001 to release his third studio album, Come Home with Me, the following year. It received platinum certification by the RIAA and spawned the singles "Oh Boy" (featuring Juelz Santana) and "Hey Ma" (featuring Juelz Santana, Freekey Zekey and Toya), which peaked at numbers four and three on the Billboard Hot 100, respectively. His fourth studio album, Purple Haze (2004) was met with similar success and likewise received gold certification by the RIAA.

Due to personal disagreements with Jay-Z, Giles and his label parted ways with Roc-A-Fella in 2005 in favor of Asylum Records. In 2006, Giles released his fifth studio album Killa Season, accompanied by a film of the same name in which Giles starred and made his director-screenwriter debut. In 2009, after taking a hiatus due to his mother's health, Giles returned to music and released his sixth studio album Crime Pays (2009), which peaked at number three on the Billboard 200. A decade later, he released his seventh album, Purple Haze 2 (2019), which narrowly entered the chart.

Prior to his solo career, Giles formed the short-lived hip hop group Children of the Corn alongside Big L and Mase in 1993; they disbanded in 1997. He subsequently formed the hip hop collective the Diplomats (also known as Dipset) in the latter year, alongside his longtime affiliate Jim Jones and cousin Freekey Zekey. He later performed as one half of the duo U.N. (Us Now) with fellow Harlem native Vado; the duo released two collaborative projects. In addition to the Killa Season film, Giles has acted in other works including the Roc-A-Fella films Paper Soldiers and Paid in Full in 2002.

== Biography ==
=== 1976–1997: Early life and career beginnings ===
Giles was born and raised in the East Harlem neighborhood of Upper Manhattan, New York City. He was raised by his mother, Fredericka Giles (July 10, 1955 – February 9, 2023). He went to school at the Manhattan Center for Science and Mathematics, where he met his longtime friends Mase and Jim Jones. He was a promising basketball player alongside Mase; however, he was unable to take advantage of scholarship offers due to his poor academic standing. Instead, he enrolled in a college in Texas, without even graduating from high school, but was expelled and returned to Harlem where he began selling drugs before starting his rap career. Giles was eventually introduced to the Notorious B.I.G. through his childhood friend Mase. B.I.G. introduced Giles to Lance Rivera, who signed him to his label, Untertainment.

He began his musical career in the mid-1990s, rapping alongside Big L, Mase, and his cousin Bloodshed, in a group called Children of the Corn. After Bloodshed's death in a car accident on March 2, 1997, the group disbanded and the remaining members pursued solo careers.

=== 1998–2002: Confessions of Fire, S.D.E. and Come Home with Me ===
Two years before Big L's murder in 1999, Cam'ron was introduced to the Notorious B.I.G. by Mase who was signed to Bad Boy Records at the time. Biggie was so impressed by Cam'ron that he introduced him to his partner Lance "Un" Rivera who signed Cam'ron to his Untertainment label, distributed by Epic Records. His debut album, Confessions of Fire, was released a year later in July 1998 and included singles such as "3-5-7" (which was also featured in the movie Woo), and "Horse and Carriage" featuring Mase, which reached the R&B Top Ten. The album achieved gold status and made the Top 10 of both the pop and R&B charts.

In 2000, Cam'ron was working with music executive Tommy Mottola and released his second album S.D.E. (Sports Drugs & Entertainment) on Sony/Epic Records. With features from Destiny's Child, Juelz Santana, Jim Jones, N.O.R.E., and producer Digga, it included the relatively successful singles, "Let Me Know" and "What Means the World to You". The album reached Number 2 on the R&B/Hip-Hop Albums chart, and Number 14 on the Billboard 200.

After demanding a release from Sony/Epic Records, Cam'ron signed with his childhood friend and new manager Damon Dash to Roc-A-Fella Records in December 2001, alongside artists such as Jay-Z, Beanie Sigel, Freeway and Memphis Bleek. A reported $4.5 million record deal was agreed upon with Damon Dash and his Roc-A-Fella partners Kareem Biggs and Jay-Z in the form of a record advance. His third and most successful album Come Home with Me was released in 2002 featuring guests such as Jay-Z, Beanie Sigel, and Memphis Bleek, and production from Just Blaze, Kanye West and the Heatmakerz. It included the hit singles "Oh Boy" and "Hey Ma", which both featured the Diplomats newest member Juelz Santana. The album achieved platinum status and served as a stepping stone for Cam'ron's group the Diplomats to sign with Roc-A-Fella.

In 2002, Cam'ron went on to appear in the Damon Dash produced film, Paid in Full, in which he played one of three main characters alongside Mekhi Phifer and Wood Harris. In 2006 he started shooting his movie for his album titled Killa Season; the film would mark both Cam'ron's screenwriting and directorial debuts, as well as his return to acting. Killa Season was released to DVD on April 25, 2006, after a special two-day theatrical release.

=== 2003–2009: Purple Haze, Killa Season and Crime Pays ===
In March 2003, Cam'ron teamed up with his fellow Diplomats Members Jim Jones, Juelz Santana, and Freekey Zeeky to release the Diplomats' debut double album, Diplomatic Immunity, under Roc-A-Fella/Diplomat Records, which was quickly certified gold by the RIAA. The album featured the lead single "Dipset Anthem", a remix to Cam'rons hit "Hey Ma", and the (street anthem) single "I Really Mean It", as well as featuring production from Kanye West, Just Blaze, and the Heatmakerz. A year later, the Diplomats released their second album, Diplomatic Immunity 2.

On December 7, 2004, Cam'ron's fourth studio album, Purple Haze, was released on Def Jam/Roc-A-Fella Records. It featured collaborations with Kanye West, Jaheim, Twista, Juelz Santana, and various other artists and ultimately reached gold status. The album was also a critical success, being ranked 114th on Pitchfork Media's Top 200 Albums of the first decade of the 21st century List, and 10th on Rhapsody's Hip Hop's Best Albums of the Decade. However, after feeling that the album was poorly promoted and that his projects were not receiving enough attention, Cam'ron requested his release from Roc-A-Fella Records.

On April 28, 2005, Cam'ron officially joined the Warner Music Group under the Asylum Records imprint. He began work on what would be his first project for the new label. Cam'ron's fifth studio album, titled Killa Season, was released on May 16, 2006, featuring production from long-term collaborators the Heatmakerz, Charlmagne and Ty Fyffe, as well as others such as The Alchemist and I.N.F.O. Along with the album, Cam'ron released his first film, in which he wrote, directed and starred in, also titled "Killa Season". Despite selling 112,000 units in the first week and debuting at number 2 on the charts, Killa Season failed to have the same sales strength as his two previous releases, but Killa Season became certified gold.

After the release of Killa Season and his feud with 50 Cent in 2007, Cam'ron took a three-year hiatus from music after his mother suffered three strokes which left her paralyzed on her left side. He moved to Florida with her to set up her rehabilitation and therapy, and stayed there until she had fully recovered. Cam'ron's 2009 album, Crime Pays was released on Asylum/Diplomat Records, featuring the majority of the production handled by Skitzo and AraabMuzik. Although none of the singles from the album managed to chart, the album still reached number 3 on the Billboard 200 but only sold 150,000 units, making it the lowest selling album of his career. In 2009 Cam'ron formed a new label, Dipset West and new group the U.N.

=== 2010–present: Mixtapes, EPs and collaborations ===
In late 2009–early 2010, Cam'ron released a series of mixtapes hosted by DJ Drama called Boss of All Boses which featured his new upcoming artist Vado. Cam'ron also released a collaboration album with his new group the U.N. which included himself and fellow Harlem rapper Vado titled Heat in Here Vol. 1; the first single off the album was "Speaking Tongues" which peaked at No. 82 on the U.S. R&B charts. Cam'ron announced that he would be releasing a joint album with rapper Vado called Gunz n' Butta; on April 19, 2011, the album was released on E1 Music. In 2013, Vado signed with We the Best Music Group after his personal friendship with Cam'ron eroded, although Vado maintained at the time that they still worked on a business level and had no animosity towards him. After three years Cam'ron and Jim Jones decided to mend their differences and start working together again for the third installment of the Diplomatic Immunity album along with fellow Diplomats members Juelz Santana and Freekey Zekey. Cam'ron announced that the Diplomats album's release would take place around Christmas 2010. The first promotional single featuring the reunited Diplomats members was titled "Salute"; it was produced by AraabMuzik and would later appear on Jim Jones album Capo.

In 2012 Cam'ron was featured on rapper/singer Wiz Khalifa's fourth studio album O.N.I.F.C. on a song titled "The Bluff". Also In 2012 Cam'ron would be featured on rapper/singer Nicki Minaj's second studio album Pink Friday: Roman Reloaded on a song titled "I Am Your Leader" along with rapper Rick Ross.

In 2013 during an interview Cam'ron discussed his seventh upcoming studio album Killa Season 2 stating that it will feature guest appearances from Dipset, T.I., Nicki Minaj, and Wiz Khalifa. On October 1, 2013, Cam'ron released his promotional mixtape for the album titled Ghetto Heaven Vol 1.

In January 2014, according to Complex Magazine, Cam'ron and A-Trak were to team up for a collaborative EP to be titled Federal Reserve which would be executive-produced by Dame Dash and have featured appearances by Juelz Santana and Jim Jones. In May, they put out the first single from the album, titled "Dipsh*ts", featuring commentary from Dame Dash and Juelz Santana on the hook and an accompanying official video. On February 11, 2014, Cam'ron along with fashion designer Mark McNairy revealed their "Cape line" during New York fashion week. On October 20, 2014, via his Instagram Cam'ron revealed and released his "Ebola mask" stating on the caption "Ebola is no joking matter, so if u have to be safe, be fashionable". Cam'ron also has a fashion clothing line titled "Dipset USA" which is branded off his former label Diplomat Records. On July 1, 2014, Cam'ron released his 1st of the Month, Vol. 1 EP. On August 1, 2014, Cam'ron released his 1st of the Month, Vol. 2 EP, it included the single "So Bad" featuring Nicki Minaj. On September 1, 2014, Cam'ron released his 1st of the Month, Vol. 3 EP. On October 1, 2014, Cam'ron released his 1st of the Month, Vol. 4 EP. On November 1, 2014, Cam'ron released his 1st of the Month, Vol. 5 EP. On December 1, 2014, Cam'ron released his 1st of the Month, Vol. 6 EP. On December 11, 2014, Cam'ron announced that his next studio album will not be a sequel to his fifth album Killa Season but will be a sequel to his critically acclaimed fourth studio album Purple Haze titled Purple Haze 2; Cam'ron also announced that this would be his final album. On December 16, 2014, Cam'ron would release his compilation 1st of the Month: Box Set (Deluxe Edition).

On January 1, 2015, DJ Funkmaster Flex announced via his Instagram that he had spoken to fellow Diplomats members Cam'ron, Jim Jones and Juelz Santana about an upcoming Diplomats mixtape which included Freekey Zeekey. He also stated that he would be hosting the mixtape along with DJ Khaled, Swizz Beatz and DJ Mustard.

In July 2016, Cam'ron announced an album called Killa Pink and a signature line of Reebok shoes: the Flea 2.

== Other ventures ==
=== Directing and acting ===
In 2002, Cam'ron appeared in the Damon Dash produced film, Paid in Full, in which he played one of three main characters alongside Mekhi Phifer and Wood Harris. In 2006, he started shooting video to accompany his album titled Killa Season. This was Cam'ron's screenwriting and directorial debut, as well as his return to acting. Killa Season was released to DVD on April 25, 2006, after a special two-day theatrical release.

=== Fashion designing ===
On February 11, 2014, Cam'ron, along with fashion designer Mark McNairy, revealed their "Cape line" during the New York fashion week. On October 20, 2014, via his Instagram, Cam'ron revealed and released his "Ebola mask", stating on the caption: "Ebola is no joking matter, so if u have to be safe, be fashionable". Cam'ron also has a fashion clothing line titled "Dipset USA" which is branded off his former label Diplomat Records.

=== Sports commentary ===
In 2023, Cam'ron launched an independently produced sports news talk show, called It Is What It Is. Cam'ron's co-host on the show is rapper Mase. The show's first episode premiered on February 27, 2023, on YouTube. In the months proceeding the show's launch, it has achieved viral success on the internet. According to Cam'ron, he has already turned down several multi-million dollar offers from buyers looking to purchase the show. In August 2023, it was officially announced that the show has partnered with Underdog Fantasy Sports.

== Feuds ==
=== Jay-Z ===
Although there had been rumors of a feud between the two emcees, Cam'ron went public first with a track on "Killa Season" called "You Gotta Love It (Jay-Z Diss)" featuring ex-Dipset member Max B. In the song, Cam'ron takes jabs at Jay-Z's age, his alleged "biting" (stealing) of lyrics, and his current girlfriend. He references Jay-Z using the Notorious B.I.G.'s rhymes, rapping "You ain't the only one with big wallets got it my shit's brolick but ya publishing should go to Miss Wallace." He then released another song "Swagger Jacker (Biter Not a Writer)" to highlight the many songs Jay-Z has borrowed lines from. In the next issue of XXL, Cam'ron explained the beef originated when Jay-Z became CEO and President of Roc-A-Fella Records. In 2010, Cam'ron stated he does not have any issues with Jay-Z anymore.

In 2013, on "Pound Cake", a song by Drake, Jay-Z mentioned Cam'ron again by rapping (in the middle of a verse): "Now here's the icing on the cake/ Cake, cake-cake, cake-cake, uhh/ I'm just getting started, oh, yeah, we got it bitch/ I've done made more millionaires than the lotto did/ Dame made millions, Bigg made millions/ Ye made millions, Just made millions/ Lyor made millions, Cam made millions/ Beans would tell you if he wasn't in his feelin[g]s."

Cam replied briefly on "Come and Talk to Me" off of Ghetto Heaven Vol. 1: "She said Jay made you a millionaire? and looked me in the eyes/ Said cake, cake, cake, got that from the pies/ We made each other millions, that was my reply/ had a mill before I met him, baby, that ain't no lie/ See he named some Harlem cats and the homie from the Chi / but my thing, he ain't name nobody from the Stuy".

On April 26, 2019, he and Jay-Z ended their feud at the re-opened Webster Hall.

=== 50 Cent ===
On February 1, 2007, Cam'ron and 50 Cent had a live argument on The Angie Martinez Show on Hot 97 radio. 50 Cent commented that he felt Koch Entertainment was a "graveyard", meaning major record labels would not work with their artists. Cam'ron then ridiculed the record sales of G-Unit members Lloyd Banks and Mobb Deep by pointing out that Dipset member Jim Jones outsold both of their albums despite not being signed to a major label, and also went on to clarify that his group, the Diplomats, had a distribution deal from several labels. Both rappers released diss songs with videos on YouTube. 50 Cent released "Funeral Music", and suggested in the song that Cam'ron is no longer able to lead the Diplomats and that Jim Jones should take his place. Cam'ron responded with "Curtis" and "Curtis Pt. II", in which he makes fun of 50 Cent's appearance, calling him "a gorilla, with rabbit teeth". 50 Cent responded by releasing "Hold On" with Young Buck. Since 2009, the feud slowly died down, and they eventually reconciled in 2016.

=== Jim Jones ===
Cam'ron revealed in 2007 that he was no longer speaking to his fellow Diplomat members Juelz Santana and Jim Jones, leading to speculation that the group had officially broken up. However, despite admitting that he did not want to contact Jim Jones, he said that he had no hard feelings towards him. In an interview with Miss Info, Cam'ron said: "I still haven't spoken to Jim. But Jim ran with me for over 10 years, he worked hard, and I wish him the best of luck. Everybody thinks I'm mad at Jim. Why am I mad? I told people for years that Jimmy was gonna be a star. So it's better on my resume. I wish him the best." After three years of not speaking, Cam'ron and Jim Jones mended their differences in April 2010. In late 2011, both appeared together on Wolfgang Gartner's album Weekend in America, on the track "Circus Freaks".

Tensions between the two reignited in January 2025, with Complex reporting that Cam'ron and Jones were no longer on speaking terms.

=== Kanye West ===
Both Cam'ron and Jim Jones took out their frustrations on former label-mate Kanye West in defense of former CEO Dame Dash (due to their longtime friendship dating back to growing up in Harlem) by releasing a song titled "Toast" rhyming over Kanye West's song "Runaway". The feud eventually ended, evidenced by Cam'ron, Jim Jones, and Kanye West collaborating on a song called "Christmas in Harlem".

=== J. Cole ===
Cam'ron first collaborated with J. Cole on "95 South" (2021) and then again on "Ready '24" (2024). Cam'ron filed a lawsuit against Cole in October 2025. In his claim, he alleged that these collaborations came with the agreement that Cole would return the favor, either by featuring on a song or by appearing on Cam'ron's podcast. The filing, which claimed Cam'ron's "Ready '24" verse was recorded in June 2022, said that Cole was repeatedly asked over the next two years to fulfill his promise but did not, that "Ready '24" was released without authorization, and that Cam'ron had not received royalties for the song. Cole and his team filed a motion to dismiss in February 2026, denying all allegations. The two reconciled when Cole appeared on Cam'ron's Talk with Flee podcast in March 2026. Cam'ron explained that he did not expect the lawsuit to go to trial but felt it was necessary to get Cole's attention; Cole sympathized with Cam'ron's perspective. Both parties' attorneys wrote in a May 2026 court filing that the lawsuit had been settled out of court.

== Personal life ==
On October 23, 2005, Cam'ron was leaving a nightclub in Washington, D.C., having performed the day before at Howard University. While stopped at a traffic light at the intersection of New York and New Jersey Avenues shortly after midnight, a passenger of a nearby car threatened Cam'ron to "give up" his 2006 Lamborghini. Cam'ron resisted, and the man then shot him. Cam'ron was struck at least once as he was holding the steering wheel, but he was able to drive, going the wrong way on streets and flashing his lights, until a fan drove him to Howard University Hospital. The gunman and passenger drove off, crashed into a parked car, and fled the scene. D.C. Metro Police recovered a cell phone from the scene of the crash, which they tried to use to trace the suspects. He stated that he does not know who shot him, although later, in the song "Gotta Love It" featuring Max B, Cam'ron claims that he saw the gunman throw up the Roc-A-Fella Records diamond hand signal before shots were fired.

On April 22, 2007, Cam'ron was interviewed on 60 Minutes as part of a piece on the Stop Snitchin' movement. He stated that he would "not help the police" try to locate a potential shooter, saying he is "not a snitch" and helping the police would probably hurt his record sales, adding "It's about business but it's still also a code of ethics." When asked by Anderson Cooper if he would tell the police if a serial killer was living next to him, Cam'ron replied "I would probably move" but would not inform the police. He later apologized, calling it an "error in judgement": "Where I come from, once word gets out that you've cooperated with the police that only makes you a bigger target of criminal violence. That is a dark reality in so many neighborhoods like mine across America. I'm not saying its right, but its reality." Cam'ron has had contact with the police in the past. According to The Smoking Gun, New York Police Department records indicate that Giles filed a report with police after he was assaulted by 15 unidentified men at a park in Harlem in 1999.

== Discography ==
Studio albums

- Confessions of Fire (1998)
- S.D.E. (2000)
- Come Home with Me (2002)
- Purple Haze (2004)
- Killa Season (2006)
- Crime Pays (2009)
- Purple Haze 2 (2019)

Collaboration albums

- Heat in Here Vol. 1 (with Vado) (2010)
- Gunz n' Butta (with Vado) (2011)
- U Wasn't There (with A-Trak) (2022)

== Filmography ==
- Paid in Full (2002)
- State Property 2 (2005)
- Killa Season (2006)
- Rap Sheet: Hip-Hop and the Cops (2006)
- First of the Month (2012)
- Percentage (2013)
- Love & Hip Hop: New York (2012; 2016–2017)
- Honor Up (2018)
- Queens (2021)
- Happy Gilmore 2 (2025)

== See also ==
- List of people from Harlem
