= Vado (rapper) =

American rapper

- Also known as: Movado; Bank Sinatra; Slime Rawsteen
- Born: Teyon Isiah Winfree; March 13, 1983 (age 43)
- Origin: Manhattan, New York City, U.S.
- Genres: East Coast hip-hop
- Occupations: Rapper; songwriter; actor
- Years active: 2000–present
- Labels: LongRun; Sony; Beautiful Life; gamma.; E1; We the Best; Cash Money; Republic; Interscope; DD172; BluRoc
- Member of: U.N.

Teyon Isiah Winfree (born March 13, 1983), better known by his stage name Vado (backronym for Violence And Drugs Only), is an American rapper. He formed the East Coast hip hop duo U.N. (Us Now) with hometown native Cam'ron in 2009; the duo has released two collaborative albums—Heat in Here Vol. 1 (2010) and Gunz n' Butta (2011)—as well as the Boss of All Bosses mixtape series.

As a solo act, Vado signed with DJ Khaled's We the Best Music Group, an imprint of Cash Money and Republic Records in 2013 to release his debut commercial single, "My Bae" (featuring Jeremih) the following year. Despite failing to chart, Vado guest appeared on Khaled's studio albums We the Best Forever (2011), Suffering from Success (2013), and I Changed a Lot (2015); he continued releasing mixtapes for We the Best until parting ways with the label in 2017.

== Early life ==
Teyon Winfree was born on March 13, 1985. He was raised in Harlem and grew up on 144th and Lenox. His mother is of Ghanaian, while his father is of African American descent. Winfree first started writing at 16 and was influenced by Ma$e, Cam'ron, and Big L. At age 19, Vado appeared on the public access television show Mad Ciphas. In 2008, he recorded songs with childhood friend Jae Millz. Winfree's first stage name was MOVADO, later shortened to VADO, an acronym which stands for "Violence And Drugs Only."

== Career ==
In March 2009, a mutual friend linked Vado with New York rapper and Dipset leader Cam'ron, who subsequently invited Vado to a recording session they soon-after formed the hip hop duo U.N., which stands for "Us Now". In August of that year, U.N. released their first mixtape Bosses of All Bosses to positive reception. The following year, U.N. released their debut album, Heat in Here Vol. 1 in May through Asylum Records, an imprint of Warner Records. Vado then released his debut solo project, a mixtape titled Slime Flu in October 2010 through Cam'ron's Diplomat Records label, with distribution from independent label E1 Music. That same year, Cam'ron introduced Vado to Roc-A-Fella Records co-founder Damon Dash, as Cam'ron and Dash were in talks of U.N. signing to the newly re-launched Roc-A-Fella. Vado signed with Dash's subsidiary record label, BluRoc. The U.N. recording outfit also signed to BluRoc, although they would only release the five-song extended play Blu Tops under the label in February 2012. During this time, many outlets described Vado as a "protégé" or "hype man" of Cam'ron.

In March 2011, Vado signed a solo contract with Interscope Records. However, he released no projects under the label. In the following month of April, U.N. independently released their second album, Gunz n' Butta, which saw a commercial improvement from its predecessor at number 78 on the Billboard 200, also spawning the singles "Speaking in Tungs" and "Hey Muma." In the same month, Vado made a guest appearance on fellow New York rapper Fabolous' mixtape, The S.O.U.L. Tape. In July, Vado made his first mainstream appearance on DJ Khaled's song "Future" alongside Ace Hood, Wale, and Meek Mill, which was included in Khaled's fifth studio album We the Best Forever. In November 2011, he released the sequel to his Slime Flu mixtape. In 2012, Vado announced his departure from Interscope as he felt more comfortable recording music for a regional audience.

On January 22, 2013, Vado released the third installment to his Slime Flu mixtape series. On January 30, 2013, Vado confirmed he signed with DJ Khaled's We the Best Music Group label, an imprint of Republic Records and Cash Money Records. His first major label mixtape, V-Day was released the following month. During the rest of 2013, Vado made guest appearances on the VH1 shows Love & Hip Hop and Black Ink Crew, and was a guest artist on Lil Wayne's Dedication 5 and DJ Khaled's Suffering from Success.

In March 2014, released his debut commercial single, "My Bae" featuring frequent Khaled collaborator Jeremih, produced by the labels in-house producer, Lee on the Beats. In December, he released his follow up commercial single "Look Me In My Eyes" featuring Rick Ross and French Montana and produced by Scott Storch. The single was from his sixth solo mixtape Sinatra, which was released earlier that year in February 2014. Both singles failed to enter the Billboard Hot 100. In 2015, he appeared on Khaled's album I Changed a Lot. After eleven mixtapes with We the Best and a two-year hiatus, he released his mixtape, LongRun: Vol. 2 independently through his own label LongRun in January 2022.

In October 2023, Vado was featured on "Still Believe In Love", a single by American singer Mary J. Blige. On May 1, 2024, Vado confirmed that he signed to Blige's new record label, Beautiful Life Records, in a distribution deal with Larry Jackson's digital distribution imprint, gamma. The singer also confirmed the signage in an interview with radio personality and television show host, Big Tigger.

On April 29, 2025, Vado's close friend, fashion stylist and businesswoman Misa Hylton filed a $5 million lawsuit against Mary J. Blige, for breach of contract and interferences, involving a business deal which regarded him. Hylton claims in the lawsuit that she launched a management company in February 2023 to represent for Vado, who would later sign a contract with Blige's imprint, Beautiful Life Records. Blige later used tactics to coerce the rapper to terminate his management contract with Hylton's company. She furthermore added that Vado completed the recording sessions for a planned album which Blige scrapped, due to him not firing Hylton.

== Discography ==
=== Collaborative albums ===
Title	Album details	Chart positions		
Title	Album details	US	US R&B	US Rap
Heat In Here Vol. 1 (with U.N.)	Released: May 25, 2010; Label: Diplomat Records, Asylum Records; Format: Digital download, streaming	146	30	16
Gunz n' Butta (with Cam'ron)	Released: April 19, 2011; Label: Diplomat Records, Entertainment One Music; Format: Digital download, streaming	78	15	7

=== Mixtapes ===
List of mixtapes, with year released
Title	Album details
Boss of All Bosses (with Cam'ron)	Released: August 18, 2009; Label: Self-released; Format: Digital download
Slime Flu	Released: October 12, 2010; Label: E1 Music; Format: Digital download
Boss of All Bosses 2 (with Cam'ron)	Released: January 12, 2010; Label: Self-released; Format: Digital download
Boss of All Bosses 2.5 (with Cam'ron)	Released: May 12, 2010; Label: Self-released; Format: Digital download
Boss of All Bosses 2.8 (with Cam'ron)	Released: September 5, 2011; Label: Self-released; Format: Digital download
Boss of All Bosses 3 (with Cam'ron)	Released: December 15, 2011; Label: Self-released; Format: Digital download
Slime Flu 2	Released: November 25, 2011; Label: Self-released; Format: Digital download
UNLostFiles (with Cam'ron)	Released: May 11, 2012; Label: Self-released; Format: Digital download
Slime Flu 3	Released: January 22, 2013; Label: Self-released; Format: Digital download
V-Day	Released: February 15, 2013; Label: We the Best, Cash Money; Format: Digital download
Slime Flu 4	Released: August 15, 2013; Label: We the Best, Cash Money; Format: Digital download
Sinatra	Released: February 10, 2014; Label: We the Best, Cash Money; Format: Digital download
V-Day II	Released: February 14, 2015; Label: We the Best, Cash Money; Format: Digital download
Slime Flu 5	Released: November 1, 2015; Label: We the Best; Format: Digital download
Sinatra 2	Released: May 29, 2017; Label: We the Best; Format: Digital download
Sinatra 2.5	Released: October 31, 2017; Label: DMG; Format: Digital download
Sinatra 3	Released: July 9, 2018; Label: The DisPensary; Format: Digital download
V-Day 3	Released: March 5, 2019; Label: LongRun/DMG; Format: Digital download
Crime Square	Released: June 11, 2019; Label: LongRun/DMG; Format: Digital download
Long Run Vol. 1	Released: October 11, 2019; Label: LongRun/DMG; Format: Digital download
Long Run Vol. 2	Released: January 21, 2022; Label: Long Run/DMG; Format: Digital download
Long Run Vol. 3	Released: November 18, 2022; Label: Long Run/DMG; Format: Digital download
V-Day 4	Released: May 12, 2023; Label: Long Run/DMG; Format: Digital download

=== Singles ===
Title	Year	Chart positions			Album
Title	Year	US	US R&B	US Rap	Album
"Speaking in Tungs" (with Cam'ron as U.N.)	2010	—	82	—	Slime Flu and Gunz n' Butta
"Hey Muma" (with Cam'ron as U.N.)	2011	—	84	—	Gunz n' Butta
"My Bae" (featuring Jeremih)	2014	—	—	—	Non-album single
"Look Me In My Eyes" (featuring Rick Ross and French Montana)	2014	—	—	—	Sinatra
"Talk To Me" (featuring DreamDoll)	2019	—	—	—	V-Day 3
"Respect My Jux" (featuring Lloyd Banks and Dave East)	2021	—	—	—	Non-album single

==== As featured artist ====
List of singles, with selected chart positions, showing year released and album name
Title	Year	Peak chart positions		Album
Title	Year	US	US R&B	Album
"Christmas in Harlem" (Kanye West featuring CyHi the Prynce, Teyana Taylor, Cam'ron, Jim Jones, Vado, Pusha T, Musiq Soulchild, & Big Sean)	2010	—	—	—N/a
"Livin' Dreams" (Akini Blake featuring Maino, Vado & Fred the Godson)	2012	—	—	—N/a
"Walk In New York" (Grafh featuring Raekwon and Vado)	2014	—	—	88 Crack Era
"Blue Bandana" Ms.Choppa featuring Vado)	2020	—	—	—N/a
"Still Believe In Love" Mary J. Blige featuring Vado)	2023	—	—	—N/a

=== Guest appearances ===
List of non-single guest appearances, with other performing artists, showing year released and album name
Title	Year	Other artist(s)	Album
"That Work"	2010	DJ Suss One, Uncle Murda, Cassidy, Joell Ortiz, French Montana	The Feature Presentation Album
"Mo Brooklyn, Mo Harlem, Mo Southside"	2011	Fabolous, Lloyd Banks	The S.O.U.L. Tape
"Future"	2011	DJ Khaled, Wale, Ace Hood, Meek Mill	We the Best Forever
"We Run The Town"	2012	Lloyd Banks	V.6: The Gift
"Shut The City Down"	2012	CashFlow	The Enterprise
"Clap, Clap, Clap" (Remix)	2012	J-Star, Twista	—N/a
"Something Else"	2012	Fred The Godson, Face49	Gordo Frederico
"Excuse Me"	2012	DJ Kay Slay, Gunplay, Uncle Murda, Sauce Money	The Return Of The Gatekeeper
"Make It Back"	2012	Bizzy Crook	P.S. I'm Sorry 2
"Out Here"	2012	Smoke DZA, ASAP Twelvy	K.O.N.Y.
"5:46 A.M."	2012	Al-Doe, Boldy James	Nose Candy.
"Violent Music"	2012	DJ Kay Slay, Busta Rhymes, DJ Paul	Grown Man Hip-Hop
"Count Your Blessings"	2013	DJ Kay Slay, Torch, Uncle Murda	Grown Man Hip Hop Part 2 (Sleepin' With The Enemy)
"I Gotta Eat"	2013	Jae Millz, Fred The Godson	Dead Presidents 2
"I Came"	2013	Funkmaster Flex, Reek da Villian	Who You Mad At? Me Or Yourself?
"The Sound Of NYC"	2013	DJ Kay Slay, Sheek Louch, Styles P	The Last Champion
"New York City"	2013	Uncle Murda, Waka Flocka Flame	—N/a
"Levels"	2013	Lil Wayne	Dedication 5
"Black Ghost"	2013	DJ Khaled	Suffering from Success
"Take That Off"	2013	DJ Khaled, Jeremih	Suffering from Success
"Paint The Sky"	2013	Lloyd Banks	A.O.N. (All Or Nothing) Series Vol. 1: F.N.O. (Failure's No Option)
"Home Invasion"	2014	Ace Hood	Starvation 3
"Fire"	2014	DJ Kay Slay, Young Chris, Papoose, Nathaniel	The Rise of a City
"Real Hip Hop"	2014	DJ Kay Slay, Papoose, Ransom	The Last Hip Hop Disciple
"American Dream"	2014	Boogz Boogetz	C.O.O.L. 2
"MMM (Remix)"	2015	Cassidy, Fred Money, J.R. Writer, Red Café, Papoose, Maino, Uncle Murda, Fat Trel, Fred the Godson, Chubby Jag, Drag-On, Dave East, Compton Menace	—N/a
"Every Time We Come Around"	2015	DJ Khaled, French Montana, Jadakiss, Ace Hood	I Changed a Lot
"Love My Niggas"	2015	Maino, Uncle Murda	K.O.B. 3
"Seniorities"	2016	Lloyd Banks, Prodigy	All or Nothing: Live It Up
"It's Harlem"	2017	DJ Kay Slay, Dave East, Ms Hussle	The Big Brother
"A Million Bucks"	2017	DJ Kay Slay, Fatman Scoop, Nipsey Hussle, Troy Ave, Rocko	The Big Brother
"Different Scenario"	2017	Fred The Godson, Jim Jones, Jaquae	Gordo
"God Bless The Summer"	2018	Dave East	—N/a
"Da Hated"	2018	Dave East	—N/a
"Blue Hundreds"	2018	Dave East	—N/a
"Nice For What"	2018	Dave East	—N/a
"Once Upon A Time"	2018	Dave East	—N/a
"Boo'd Up"	2018	Dave East	—N/a
"Back To The Bars"	2019	DJ Kay Slay, Ninoman, Mysonne, Fred The Godson, Locksmith, Jon Connor, Joell Ortiz	Hip-Hop Frontline
"Back To The Bars Pt. 2"	2020	DJ Kay Slay, Ninoman, RJ Payne, Sauce Money, Sheek Louch, Jon Connor, Styles P	Living Legend
