= Skitzo =

American thrash metal band

- Origin: Santa Rosa, California, United States
- Genres: Thrash metal, death metal
- Years active: 1981–present
- Labels: Open Grave Records, Mourning Star Records, Wolf Hawse Media, Boneless Records, Areadeath Productions, Eternal Darkness Creations,
- Members: Lance Ozanix; Nate Clark; Liz Say; Sherri Stewart; Jason Wright
- Past members: Scott Fuller, Noah Smith; Drummin Dave (David Ostwald); Beaver Hensley; Greg Stiff; Kelly Gillis; John Crowhurst; Ron Klinger; Sunni Leigh; Jason Sullivan; Birtha LEECH; Mike Carli; Cubby Baumann; David Bailey; Tomakazi; Rudy Brajas; Sol; Mike Laird
- Website: www.Skitzo.biz

Skitzo is a thrash metal band from Santa Rosa, California, United States. The band was formed in 1980 in Healdsburg, California, when Lance Ozanix and several other people joined and called their band Venom. The name was later changed to Skitzo in 1981, after discovering that there is already a band with the same name.

The band's lead singer and songwriter, Lance Ozanix, vomits at the end of the band's performances so that the band can remain "recognizable". Ozanix can regurgitate his food and propel it 30 feet.

Ozanix appeared in an episode of Judge Judy when a woman, Sadie Luke, sued him for vomiting on her dress while Skitzo was performing at a club. Judge Judy believed that the vomiting was assault, because she was unaware that it was part of the act. Ozanix lost the case and had to pay $500 for damages as ruled by Judy. Skitzo was on the Jerry Springer Show between 1999 and 2004 making various guest appearances, regurgitating green vomit on Springer's stage, and causing "riots" in the audience. Lance Ozanix has been a guest of Howard Stern and appeared on Ripley's Believe it or Not selling his vomit paintings for $5000 each. In 1996 Ozanix was winner #3 of the NBC TV show Strange Universe.

Skitzo performed at the Phoenix Theater in Petaluma, California on October 8, 2011, for the band's 30th anniversary, and in 2016 the band celebrated their 35th anniversary.

== Studio albums ==
- Skitzo Demo, 1985
- Wrathrage Demo, 1986
- Mosh Till Mush Demo, 1987
- Derageous EP, 1989
- Haunting Ballads Single, 1990
- The Skulling EP, 1991
- Evilution Full-length, 1992
- Synusar'sukus Full-length, 1994
- Psychobabble Full-length, 1996
- Got Sick! Full-length, 2000
- M-80's Best of/Compilation, 2001
- Hellavator Musick Full-length, 2002
- Heavy Shit Full-length, 2005
- Radio Promo Demo, 2007
- Five Point Containment Full-length, 2007
- Mosh till Vomit Best of/Compilation, 2008
- Skitzo / Foul Stench Split, 2009
- Put Your Face in Jesus EP
- Spit Pea Soup EP
- Dementia Praecox - 2015
- Skitzo Thrash Slashing Hits LP Vinyl (only) 2022

More album downloads for free https://skitzo3.bandcamp.com/music
