= The Diplomats discography =

- Studio albums: 3
- Compilation albums: 3
- Singles: 9
- Music videos: 8
- Mixtapes: 8

The Diplomats, also popularly known as Dipset, are a Harlem-based hip hop group founded by Cam'ron and Jim Jones in 1997. discography consists of three studio albums, 6 singles, and one soundtrack on Diplomat Records. Music videos are also included, however, solo works from the groups' members, Cam'Ron, Jim Jones, Juelz Santana, Freekey Zekey, JR Writer, Hell Rell, & 40 Cal, Stack Bundles (deceased), Katt Williams and Max B are not included.

The first commercial appearance of the group was on Cam'ron's 2000 album S.D.E., released on Epic Records. During this period, various members of the original group consisting of Cam'ron, Jim Jones, and others, were first signed together as a group to Roc-A-Fella Records from 2002 to 2004, though they are now signed to their own label, Diplomat Records. Each individual artist, however is signed to a different label, including E1 Music, Asylum, and Def Jam, among others.

The group came to further popularity in 2002 with the release of Cam'ron's third album, Come Home With Me. The lead singles were platinum hits "Oh Boy" and "Hey Ma", which both featured group mate Juelz Santana. The group followed Cam'ron's solo album shortly after with their debut album Diplomatic Immunity released in 2003, which featured remixes of both songs, as well as lead single "Dipset Anthem" which peaked at #64 on the Billboard Hot R&B/Hip-Hop Songs chart. The double-disc album was a success and quickly became certified gold by RIAA under two months after its release. By the time of the release of their 2004 follow-up, Diplomatic Immunity 2, additional members Hell Rell, 40 Cal., and J. R. Writer had joined the group.

== Albums ==
=== Studio albums ===
List of albums, with selected chart positions and certifications
Title	Album details	Peak chart positions		Certifications
Title	Album details	US	US R&B	Certifications
Diplomatic Immunity	Released: March 25, 2003; Label: Roc-a-Fella, Diplomat, Def Jam; Format: CD, LP, cassette, digital download	8	1	RIAA: Gold
Diplomatic Immunity 2	Released: November 23, 2004; Label: Diplomat, Koch; Format: CD, LP, cassette, digital download	46	8	
Diplomatic Ties	Released: November 22, 2018; Label: Diplomat, Empire; Format: Digital download	—	—	
"—" denotes a recording that did not chart.

=== Compilation albums ===
List of compilations, with selected chart positions and certifications
Title	Album details	Peak chart positions		
Title	Album details	US	US R&B	US Rap
More Than Music, Vol. 1	Released: July 12, 2005; Label: Diplomat, Koch; Format: CD, digital download	—	—	—
Cam'ron Presents Dukedagod Dipset: The Movement Moves On	Released: April 11, 2006; Label: Diplomat, Asylum; Format: CD, digital download	—	—	—
Dipset: More Than Music, Vol. 2	Released: May 8, 2007; Label: Diplomat, Koch; Format: CD, digital download	—	—	—

=== Mixtapes ===
List of mixtapes, with year released
Title	Album details
Diplomats Volume 1	Released: 2002; Label: Diplomat; Hosted by DJ Kay Slay; Format: CD, Digital download
Diplomats Volume 2	Released: 2002; Label: Diplomat; Hosted by DJ Kay Slay; Format: CD, Digital download
Diplomats Volume 3	Released: 2002; Label: Diplomat; Hosted by DJ Kay Slay; Format: CD, Digital download
Diplomats Volume 4	Released: 2003; Label: Diplomat; Hosted by DJ Kay Slay; Format: CD, Digital download
Diplomats Volume 5	Released: 2003; Label: Diplomat; Hosted by DJ Kay Slay; Format: CD, Digital download
Memorial Day	Released: May 25, 2005; Label: Diplomat; Format: CD, Digital download

== Singles ==
=== As lead artist ===
List of singles, with selected chart positions and certifications, showing year released and album name
Title	Year	Peak chart positions	Album
Title	Year	US R&B	Album
"Built This City"	2002	94	Diplomatic Immunity
"Dipset Anthem"	2003	64	Diplomatic Immunity
"S.A.N.T.A.N.A."	2004	86	Diplomatic Immunity 2
"Crunk Muzik"	2004	84	Diplomatic Immunity 2 & On My Way to Church
"Have My Money"	2015	—	non-album singles
"Do Something"	2015	—	non-album singles
"Once Upon a Time"	2017	—	non-album singles

== See also ==
- Cam'ron discography
- Jim Jones discography
- Juelz Santana discography
