= More Than Music Vol. 1 =

More Than Music, Vol. 1

Mixtape by Dipset
- Released: June 21, 2005
- Studio: The Honor Room (New York, NY); Santana's World (New Jersey); Dreamsound Studios (Harlem, NY); Dark Dimension Studios (New York, NY); Sony Music Studios (New York, NY); Ray House
- Genre: Hip-hop
- Length: 1:07:18
- Label: Diplomat; Koch
- Producer: Dame Grease; Darrell "Digga" Branch; DJ Green Lantern; Doe Boyz; DukeDaGod; J. Armz; John Dolo; Knoxbonikz; Mayor; Nomadic; Pro-V; Scram Jones; Skitzo; The Heatmakerz; Wattz; Zurc

Dipset chronology
Memorial Day (2005)	More Than Music, Vol. 1 (2005)	The Movement Moves On (2006)

Professional ratings
Review scores
Source	Rating
AllHipHop	3.5/5 stars
AllMusic	2.5/5 stars
HipHopDX	3/5
Pitchfork	7.7/10
RapReviews	5.5/10

More Than Music, Vol. 1 is a mixtape by American hip-hop collective The Diplomats. It was released on June 21, 2005, through Diplomat Records; with distribution via Koch Records.

Recording sessions took place at The Honor Room, Dreamsound Studios, Dark Dimension Studios and Sony Music Studios in New York City, Santana's World in New Jersey and Ray House. Production was handled by The Heatmakerz, Doe Boyz, Scram Jones, DukeDaGod, Skitzo, Dame Grease, Darrell "Digga" Branch, DJ Green Lantern, J. Arm, John Dolo, Knoxbonikz, Mayor, Nomadic, Pro-V, Wattz and Zurc, with co-producers Ash and Wreck.

In the United States, the album peaked at number 22 on the Billboard 200, number 7 on the Top R&B/Hip-Hop Albums, number 5 on the Top Rap Albums and number 2 on the Independent Albums charts.

Its sequel mixtape, More Than Music Vol. 2, would be released on December 5, 2006.

== Track listing ==
No.	Title	Writer(s)	Producer(s)	Length
1.	"More Than Music" (performed by DukeDaGod, Hell Rell and J.R. Writer)	George Moore; Durell Mohammed; Rusty Brito; Damon Blackmon	Dame Grease; DukeDaGod (co.)	3:26
2.	"Dipset Symphony" (performed by Juelz Santana, Jim Jones, Hell Rell, J.R. Writer, 40 Cal. and Un Kasa)	LaRon James; Joseph Jones II; Mohammed; Brito; Calvin Byrd; Antonio Wilder; John Armwood; Moore; S. Billiam	J. Armz; DukeDaGod (co.)	2:43
3.	"Back in the Building" (performed by Hell Rell)	Mohammed; Gregory Green; Sean Thomas	The Heatmakerz	4:15
4.	"Santana's Town, Pt. 2" (performed by Juelz Santana)	James; Bigram Zayas; Moore	Develop; DukeDaGod (co.)	3:38
5.	"What Is This" (performed by Jim Jones)	Jones II; O. Wharton; J. Alvaraz; C. Chang	Zurc; Mayor	3:53
6.	"Open Your Eyez" (performed by 40 Cal.)	Byrd; Dario Rodriguez	John Dolo; Wreck (co.); Skitzo (co.)	3:24
7.	"Somebody Gotta Die Tonight" (performed by Cam'Ron and Freekey Zekey)	Cameron Giles; Ezekiel Jiles; James D'Agostino	DJ Green Lantern	5:00
8.	"You Make Me Say" (performed by J.R. Writer)	Brito; Green; Thomas; Moore	The Heatmakerz; DukeDaGod (co.)	2:34
9.	"Sucker for Love Radio Interlude" (performed by DukeDaGod and Ash)	Moore; Ashley Middleton	Nomadic; Ash (co.)	2:22
10.	"So Whats It Gonna Be?" (performed by Juelz Santana and Fabolous)	James; John Jackson; Zayas; Moore	Doe Boyz; DukeDaGod (co.)	4:22
11.	"The Best Out" (performed by J.R. Writer, Hell Rell, 40 Cal. and Jay Bezel)	Brito; Mohammed; Byrd; Corley Preston; Rodriguez	Skitzo; DukeDaGod (co.)	4:24
12.	"Bloodshed R.I.P. Freestyle" (performed by Cam'Ron and Bloodshed)	Giles; Derek Michael Armstead; Darrell Branch	Darrell "Digga" Branch	1:04
13.	"No Days Off" (performed by Juelz Santana)	James; Moore	DukeDaGod	3:59
14.	"40th Boys" (performed by 40 Cal. and A-Mafia)	Byrd; Abdul Muhammad Holmes; Marc Shemer	Scram Jones	3:44
15.	"The Pit" (performed by J.R. Writer, Hell Rell and 40 Cal.)	Brito; Mohammed; Byrd; David Stokes; Elijah Scott; Stephen Hacker	Knoxbonikz	3:53
16.	"Get Down" (performed by Cam'Ron and Juelz Santana)	Giles; James; Andrew Thielk; Hacker	Pro-V	4:31
17.	"So Gangsta" (performed by Jha Jha and Un Kasa)	Natoya Handy; Wilder; Marco Nunez; Hacker	Wattz	4:03
18.	"What Kind of Life Is This" (performed by Juelz Santana and Razah)	James; Martell Nelson; Green; Thomas	The Heatmakerz	3:07
19.	"If Only You Believe" (performed by J.R. Writer)	Brito; Shemer; Moore; Rodriguez	Scram Jones	2:56
Total length:				1:07:18

Sample credits

- Track 2 contains samples from the recording "Hard to Handle" written by Alvertis Isbell, Allen Jones and Otis Redding, performed by Otis Redding.
- Track 19 contains replayed elements of the composition "Miracles" written by Marty Balin.

== Personnel ==
- George "DukeDaGod" Moore – vocals (tracks: 1, 9), producer (track 13), co-producer (tracks: 1, 2, 4, 8, 10, 11), recording (tracks: 1, 2, 8, 11, 14, 15), executive producer, A&R
- Durell "Hell Rell" Mohammed – vocals (tracks: 1–3, 11, 15)
- Rusty "J.R. Writer" Brito – vocals (tracks: 1, 2, 8, 11, 15, 19)
- LaRon "Juelz Santana" James – vocals (tracks: 2, 4, 10, 13, 16, 18), associate executive producer
- Joseph "Jim Jones" Jones II – vocals (tracks: 2, 5), associate executive producer
- Calvin "40 Cal." Byrd – vocals (tracks: 2, 6, 11, 14, 15)
- Antonio "Un Kasa" Wilder – vocals (tracks: 2, 17)
- Cameron "Cam'Ron" Giles – vocals (tracks: 7, 12, 16), executive producer
- Ezekiel "Freekey Zekey" Jiles – vocals (track 7)
- Ashley "Ash" Middleton – vocals & co-producer (track 9)
- John "Fabolous" Jackson – vocals (track 10)
- Corley "Jay Bezel" Preston – vocals (track 11)
- Derek "Bloodshed" Armstead – vocals (track 12)
- Abdul "A-Mafia" Holmes – vocals (track 14)
- Natoya "Jha-Jha" Handy – vocals (track 17)
- Martell "Razah" Nelson – vocals (track 18)
- Calvin "Mister Cee" Laburn – additional vocals (track 2)
- Damon "Dame Grease" Blackman – producer (track 1)
- John "J. Armz" Armwood – producer (track 2)
- Gregory Green – producer (tracks: 3, 8, 18)
- Sean Thomas – producer (tracks: 3, 8, 18)
- Bigram "DVLP" Zayas – producer (tracks: 4, 10)
- Zurc – producer (track 5)
- Mayor – producer (track 5)
- John Dolo – producer (track 6)
- James "DJ Green Lantern" D'Agostino – producer (track 7)
- Nomadic – producer (track 9)
- Dario "Skitzo" Rodriguez – producer (track 11), co-producer (track 6)
- Darrell "Digga" Branch – producer (track 12)
- Marc "Scram Jones" Shemer – producer (tracks: 14, 19)
- David "Knoxville" Stokes – producer (track 15)
- Andrew "Pro-V" Thielk – producer (track 16)
- Marco "Wattz" Nunez – producer (track 17)
- Wreck – co-producer (track 6)
- Mike Thomas – recording (tracks: 3, 4, 6, 9, 10, 13, 16, 17), mixing (tracks: 1–4, 6, 8–10, 13–17, 19)
- Vernil Rogers – recording (track 5)
- Mike Peters – recording (track 7)
- Ray Rock – recording (track 12)
- Carlisle Young – recording (track 18), mixing (tracks: 5, 11, 18)
- Eric "Ibo" Butler – mixing (track 7)
- Andrew Kelley – art direction, design
- Oluwaseye Olusa – photography
- Ted D'Ottavio – photography
- Stephen "Spliff" Hacker – A&R administrator
- Jamel George – A&R administrator
- Adrian Williams – A&R assistant
- Karen Civil – A&R assistant

== Charts ==
Chart (2005)	Peak position
US Billboard 200	22
US Top R&B/Hip-Hop Albums (Billboard)	7
US Top Rap Albums (Billboard)	5
US Independent Albums (Billboard)	2
