= More Than Music Vol. 2 =

Mixtape by Dipset
- Released: May 8, 2007
- Genre: Hip-hop
- Length: 1:04:11
- Label: Diplomat; Duke; Koch
- Producer: araabMUZIK; Bear One; Doe Boy; Drama Setterz; DukeDaGod; Fizzy Womack; Heck & Will; I.N.F.O.; Jonathan Dugger; Knoxville; Mardah Beatz; NOVA; Rek Beats; Spectacular; Swiff D

Dipset chronology
The Movement Moves On (2006)	More Than Music Vol. 2 (2007)

More Than Music Vol. 2 is a mixtape by American hip-hop collective The Diplomats. It was released on May 8, 2007, via Diplomat Records, Duke Productions, and Koch Records. Production was handled by I.N.F.O., NOVA, DukeDaGod, AraabMuzik, Bear One, Doe Boy, Drama Setterz, Fizzy Womack, Heck & Will, Jonathan Dugger, Knoxville, Mardah Beatz, Rek Beats, Spectacular and Swiff D, with co-producer Q-Butta.

Serving as a sequel to 2005's More Than Music Vol. 1 mixtape, the album peaked at number 26 on the Billboard 200, number 5 on the Top R&B/Hip-Hop Albums, and number 2 on both the Top Rap Albums and the Independent Albums charts.

== Track listing ==
No.	Title	Writer(s)	Producer(s)	Length
1.	"Intro" (performed by DukeDaGod and 40 Cal.)	George Moore; Calvin Byrd; Abraham Orellana	araabMUZIK; DukeDaGod (co.)	3:06
2.	"Gladiators" (performed by Hell Rell, 40 Cal., J.R. Writer, Juelz Santana and Jay Bezel)	Durell Mohammed; Byrd; Rusty Brito; LaRon James; Preston Corley; John Christopher; Scott Novelli; Moore	I.N.F.O.; NOVA; DukeDaGod (co.)	4:12
3.	"More Than Music" (performed by DukeDaGod, Juelz Santana, J.R. Writer and Hell Rell)	Moore; James; R. Brito; Mohammed; Steve Thornton	Swiff D; DukeDaGod (co.)	3:43
4.	"Street Pharmacist" (performed by Hell Rell and A-Mafia)	Mohammed; Abdul Muhammad Holmes; Christopher; Novelli; Moore	I.N.F.O.; NOVA; DukeDaGod (co.)	4:49
5.	"Dipset City" (performed by Juelz Santana, Hell Rell, J.R. Writer, 40 Cal. and Jim Jones)	James; Mohammed; R. Brito; Byrd; Joseph Jones II; Moore	Rek Beats; DukeDaGod (co.)	4:14
6.	"Suga Duga" (performed by Cam'Ron)	Cameron Giles; Jamal Grinnage; Moore; Robert Perry	Fizzy Womack; DukeDaGod (co.)	4:23
7.	"Anniversary" (performed by Jim Jones, Max B. and Mel Matrix)	Jones II; Charles Wingate; Jamel Jones; M. Washington; Moore	Bear' One; DukeDaGod (co.)	4:37
8.	"The Stick Up (Skit)"	Levi Wanzer; Christopher Roscoe		2:54
9.	"The Corner" (performed by J.R. Writer, 40 Cal., Hell Rell and Karen Civil)	R. Brito; Byrd; Mohammed; H. Mendoza Jr.; Moore	Heck & Will; DukeDaGod (co.); Q Butta (co.)	4:44
10.	"Sometimes" (performed by Jha Jha and 40 Cal.)	Natoya Handy; Byrd; Moore	Mardah Beatz; DukeDaGod (co.)	3:28
11.	"Getting By" (performed by 40 Cal. and Bonita Canady)	Byrd; Moore	Doe Boy; DukeDaGod (co.)	3:26
12.	"Get That Money" (performed by Katt Williams and J.R. Writer)	Micah Williams; R. Brito; David Stokes; Moore	Knoxville; DukeDaGod (co.)	3:57
13.	"It's Over, Pt. 2" (performed by J.R. Writer, Hell Rell and A-Mafia)	R. Brito; Mohammed; Holmes; E. Brito	Spectacular; DukeDaGod (co.)	4:43
14.	"The Gun Shop" (performed by Hell Rell, J.R. Writer and 40 Cal.)	Mohammed; R. Brito; Byrd; Lasean Wiggins; T. Jackson; Moore	Drama Setterz; DukeDaGod (co.)	3:16
15.	"Feelin Myself" (performed by Hell Rell and Freekey Zekey)	Mohammed; Ezekiel Jiles; Moore	DukeDaGod	4:34
16.	"Show & Tell" (performed by Tom Gist and A-Mafia)	Tom Gist; Holmes; Jonathan Dugger; Moore	Jonathan Dugger; DukeDaGod (co.)	4:05
Total length:				1:04:11

== Personnel ==
- George "DukeDaGod" Moore – vocals (tracks: 1, 3), producer (track 15), co-producer (tracks: 1–7, 9–14, 16), executive producer, A&R
- Calvin "40 Cal." Byrd – vocals (tracks: 1, 2, 5, 9–11, 14)
- Durell "Hell Rell" Mohammed – vocals (tracks: 2–5, 9, 13–15)
- Rusty "J.R. Writer" Brito – vocals (tracks: 2, 3, 5, 9, 12–14)
- LaRon "Juelz Santana" James – vocals (tracks: 2, 3, 5), associate executive producer
- Preston "Jay Bezel" Corley – vocals (track 2)
- Abdul "A-Mafia" Holmes – vocals (tracks: 4, 13, 16)
- Joseph "Jim Jones" Jones II – vocals (tracks: 5, 7), associate executive producer
- Cameron "Cam'Ron" Giles – vocals (track 6), executive producer
- Charles "Max B." Wingate – vocals (track 7)
- Jamel "Mel Matrix" Jones – vocals (track 7)
- Karen Civil – vocals (track 9), A&R administrator
- Natoya "Jha-Jha" Handy – vocals (track 10)
- Bonita Canady – vocals (track 11)
- Micah "Katt" Williams – vocals (track 12)
- Ezekiel "Freekey Zekey" Jiles – vocals (track 15)
- Tom Gist – vocals (track 16)
- Abraham "araabMUZIK" Orellana – producer (track 1)
- John "I.N.F.O." Christopher – producer (tracks: 2, 4)
- Scott "N.O.V.A." Novelli – producer (tracks: 2, 4)
- Steve "Swiff D" Thornton – producer (track 3)
- Rek Beats – producer (track 5)
- Jamal "Lil' Fame" Grinnage – producer (track 6)
- Bear One – producer (track 7)
- Heck & Will – producer (track 9)
- Mardah Beatz – producer (track 10)
- B. "Doe Boy" Antoine – producer (track 11)
- David "Knoxville" Stokes – producer (track 12)
- E. "Spectacular" Brito – producer (track 13)
- Lasean Wiggins – producer (track 14)
- T. Jackson – producer (track 14)
- Jonathan Dugger – producer (track 16)
- Steven "Q-Butta" Sanchez – co-producer (track 9)
- Arnold Mischkulnig – engineering & mixing (tracks: 1–3, 5, 6, 14, 15), mastering
- Saga Legin – engineering & mixing (tracks: 4, 11, 12, 16)
- Eric "Ibo" Butler – engineering & mixing (tracks: 7, 9, 10, 13)
- Andrew Kelley – art direction, design
- Earl Randolph – cover photo
- Matt Roady – cover photo
- Paul Grosso – creative director
- Alyson Abbagnaro – A&R administrator
- Adrian Williams – A&R administrator

== Charts ==
Chart (2007)	Peak position
US Billboard 200	26
US Top R&B/Hip-Hop Albums (Billboard)	5
US Top Rap Albums (Billboard)	2
US Independent Albums (Billboard)	2
