= The Movement Moves On =

Mixtape by Dipset
- Released: April 11, 2006
- Studio: Platinum Sounds Studio; Saga Studios; Legindary Studio; Romeo Studio; Santana's World Studios; Battery Studios; Honor Room Studios; Thai Money Studios; Emmis Communications Hot 97
- Genre: Hip-hop
- Length: 1:16:30
- Label: Diplomat; Asylum
- Producer: "Big" Dennis Rivera; Carlisle Young; Charlemagne; Dans and Francis; Develop; Flaco The Great; Frequency; Knoxville; NOVA; Now Whut Productions; Raw From 40th; Scram Jones; Skitzo; Stay Getting Productions; The Beat Firm; Thumpcity Productions

Dipset chronology
More Than Music Vol. 1 (2005)	The Movement Moves On (2006)	More Than Music Vol. 2 (2007)

Professional ratings
Review scores
Source	Rating
HipHopDX	1/5
RapReviews	5/10

Cam’Ron Presents DukeDaGod – DipSet: The Movement Moves On is a mixtape by American hip-hop collective The Diplomats. It was released on April 11, 2006, through Diplomat Records; with distribution via Asylum Records. Recording sessions took place at Platinum Sounds Studio, Saga Studios, Legindary Studio, Romeo Studio, Santana's World Studios, Battery Studios, Honor Room Studios, Thai Money Studios and Emmis Communications Hot 97. Production was handled by Knoxville, "Big" Dennis Rivera, Carlisle Young, Charlemagne, Dans and Francis, Develop, Flaco The Great, Frequency, NOVA, Now Whut Productions, Raw From 40th, Scram Jones, Skitzo, Stay Getting Productions, The Beat Firm, and Thumpcity Productions. It features contributions from Cam'ron, Hell Rell, 40 Cal., J.R. Writer, A-Mafia, Jim Jones, Juelz Santana and Max B. In the United States, the album peaked at number 53 on the Billboard 200, number 5 on the Top R&B/Hip-Hop Albums and number 3 on the Top Rap Albums charts.

== Track listing ==
No.	Title	Writer(s)	Producer(s)	Length
1.	"Ya'll Can't Live His Life" (performed by Cam'Ron)	Cameron Giles; Marc Shemer; George Moore	Scram Jones; Frequency	7:19
2.	"White Girls" (performed by Cam'Ron)	Giles; J. Gram; W. Tyler; Moore	The Beat Firm	3:43
3.	"Grill Em (Rmx)" (performed by J.R. Writer, Cam'Ron and Hell Rell)	Rusty Brito; Giles; Durell Mohammed; Bigram Zayas; Moore	Develop	4:57
4.	"War" (performed by Cam'Ron and Hell Rell)	Giles; Mohammed; Scott Novelli; Moore; Stephen Hacker	NOVA	3:52
5.	"I'm Laughin" (performed by Hell Rell and Cam'Ron)	Mohammed; Giles; Carlisle Young; Moore	Carlisle Young	5:01
6.	"It's Nothin (Rmx)" (performed by Cam'Ron and Hell Rell)	Giles; Mohammed; P. Wilson; Moore	Now Whut Productions	3:47
7.	"Poppin Off" (performed by Hell Rell)	Mohammed; C. Jasper; Moore; Hacker	Knoxville	3:26
8.	"Getting Money" (performed by J.R. Writer and 40 Cal.)	Brito; Calvin Byrd; C. Jasper; Moore; Hacker	Knoxville	4:14
9.	"O.G." (performed by J.R. Writer)	Brito; C. Cordero; Moore	Flaco The Great	4:31
10.	"Losin My Love" (performed by Juelz Santana)	LaRon James; Dario Rodriguez; Moore	Skitzo	2:54
11.	"Frustrated" (performed by Jim Jones, Max B and 40 Cal.)	Joseph Jones II; Byrd; W. Shaw; L. Gaines; Moore	Thumpcity Productions	5:23
12.	"Worried" (performed by 40 Cal.)	Byrd; Moore	Raw From 40th	1:25
13.	"Quiet Sound" (performed by 40 Cal.)	Byrd; Henri Charlemagne; Moore	Charlemagne	3:24
14.	"Gutta Talk" (performed by 40 Cal. and J.R. Writer)	Byrd; Moore	Dans and Francis	3:49
15.	"We Ain't Going No Where" (performed by A-Mafia)	Abdul Muhammad Holmes; M. Miller; Lawrence Simpson; Moore	Stay Gettin' Productions	2:51
16.	"Press Conference" (performed by Cam'Ron)			2:10
17.	"Funkmaster Flex Hot97 Freestyle" (performed by Cam'Ron, J.R. Writer and Hell Rell)	Giles; Brito; Mohammed; Moore	"Big" Dennis Rivera	13:44
Total length:				1:16:30

== Personnel ==
- Cameron "Cam'Ron" Giles – vocals (tracks: 1–6, 16, 17), executive producer
- Juan Rusty "J.R. Writer" Brito – vocals (tracks: 3, 8, 9, 14, 17)
- Durell "Hell Rell" Mohammed – vocals (tracks: 3–7, 17)
- Calvin "40 Cal." Byrd – vocals (tracks: 8, 11–14)
- LaRon "Juelz Santana" James – vocals (track 10), associate executive producer
- Joseph "Jim Jones" Jones II – vocals (track 11), associate executive producer
- Charles "Max B." Wingate – vocals (track 11)
- Abdul Muhammad "A-Mafia" Holmes – vocals (track 15)
- Marc "Scram Jones" Shemer – producer (track 1)
- Bryan G. "Frequency" Fryzel – producer (track 1)
- J. "Beat Firm" Gram – producer (track 2)
- Bigram "DVLP" Zayas – producer (track 3)
- Scott "N.O.V.A." Novelli – producer (track 4)
- Carlisle Young – producer (track 5)
- Now Whut Productions – producer (track 6)
- David "Knoxville" Stokes – producer (tracks: 7, 8)
- Flaco The Great – producer (track 9)
- Dario "Skitzo" Rodriguez – producer (track 10)
- Thumpcity Productions – producer (track 11)
- Raw From 40th – producer (track 12)
- Henri Charlemagne – producer (track 13)
- Dans and Francis – producer (track 14)
- Stay Getting Productions – producer (track 15)
- "Big" Dennis Rivera – producer (track 17)
- Serge Tsai – mixing (tracks: 1–6, 11)
- Saga Legin – mixing (tracks: 7–9, 14), engineering (track 14)
- Eric "IBO" Butler – mixing (track 10)
- Ryan West – engineering (track 11)
- Wreck – mixing & engineering (tracks: 12, 13)
- Greg "Grey Romora" Nomora – mixing (track 15), engineering (tracks: 7–9, 15)
- Mike Desalvo – engineering assistant (tracks: 1, 2, 4)
- Doug Rotwitt – engineering assistant (tracks: 3, 6)
- Louis Rivera – engineering assistant (track 5)
- George "DukeDaGod" Moore – executive producer, A&R
- Jacob York – executive producer
- Ralph Rivera – art direction, design
- Walik Goshorn – photography
- Adrian Williams – A&R administrator
- Karen Civil – A&R administrator

== Charts ==
Chart (2006)	Peak position
US Billboard 200	53
US Top R&B/Hip-Hop Albums (Billboard)	5
US Top Rap Albums (Billboard)	3
