= GoodWill & MGI =

American/Finnish hip hop producer duo

- Origin: Los Angeles, U.S. & Lahti, Finland
- Genres: Pop, hip hop, R&B
- Occupation(s): Record producers, songwriters, executives
- Years active: 2006–present
- Labels: Perfection Shows MP&M LLC, M-Eazy Music, Warner/Chappell Music Publishing, HMC
- Members: William "GoodWill" Rappaport; Henri "MGI" Lanz

GoodWill & MGI are a production and songwriting duo consisting of American musician William "GoodWill" Rappaport and Finnish musician Henri "MGI" Lanz. Formed in 2006, GoodWill & MGI have since been producing and writing with numerous major label artists and writers in the US, Europe, and Asia, including Pitbull, Akon, Justin Bieber, Inna, Kylie Minogue, Super Junior, EXO, 50 Cent, and Twista. Additionally, since 2011 they have been developing and breaking artists independently, including Radical Something.

In 2007, MGI moved to Los Angeles, California, for work. As of 2017, he lives in Lahti, Finland, but frequently works in the U.S.

In December 2013, they also inked their first joint venture label deal with Universal Scandinavia, which includes gold and platinum Finnish artists Nikke Ankara and Evelina among others.

== Selected discography ==
Year	Artist	Songs	Details
2014	Viceroy	"The Life" feat. Penguin Prison	Producer ***Song peaked at #1 on Hype Machine popular chart
2014	Kylie Minogue	"Les Sex"	Producer (Kiss Me Once, Warner Bros./Parlophone) *** Album peaked at #1 in Australia, #2 in the UK, and #3 on US Billboard Dance Albums Chart
2013	EXO	"Heart Attack"	Producer/co-writer (XOXO, S.M. Entertainment) ***Over 1 Million Albums sold, Certified 10× Platinum in Korea, Album peaked at #1 Billboard World Albums Chart, #1 Korean Gaon Album Chart, #1 Korean Hanteo Album Chart, #9 Japanese Oricon Album Chart
2013	Radical Something	'Ride It Out' Album	All songs produced/co-written ***Album Peaked at #9 Billboard Heatseekers Albums Chart, #3 US iTunes Alternative Albums Chart
2013	Spica	"Tonight" (single)	co-writer (Lonely, B2M Entertainment) *** #8 Billboard K-Pop Hot 100 chart
2013	Mia Martina	"La La" (single)	Producer/co-writer (TBA, CP Records) *** #45 Billboard Dance Chart, #68 Canada Hot 100
2013	Danny Fernandes	Fly Again (Broken Wings) (single), Come Back Down (single)	Producer/co-writer (Breathe Again, CP Records) *** Come Back Down peaked at #42 on Canada Hot 100
2012	Inna	Crazy Sexy Wild (Single)	Co-writer (Party Never Ends, Roton Records) ***Song peaked at #5 Romanian Hot 100, #49 Japan Hot 100, Album peaked at #3 Japanese Top 200 Albums Chart, #28 Mexican Top 100 Albums Chart
2012	Radical Something	You Feel Amazing, Say Yes, Acid Rain, Valentine, Vibe to This, Waterfalls	All songs produced/co-written (No Sweat EP) ***EP Peaked at #11 Billboard Heatseekers Albums Chart, #33 US Billboard Independent Albums Chart, #6 US ITunes Albums Chart, #3 US ITunes Alternative Albums Chart
2012	Justin Bieber	Latin Girl	Co-producer (Unreleased, Island/Def Jam)
2012	Sean Kingston	Wake The Neighbors, Go	Producer/co-writer (Unreleased, Epic Records)
2012	Cross Gene	One Way Love	Producer/co-writer (Timeless: Future, Universal Music Korea/Amuse Korea)
2011	Wisin & Yandel feat. Sean Kingston	Fever	Producer/co-writer (Los Vaqueros: El Regreso, WY/Universal Republic Records) ***Album Certified Gold in Mexico, Song performed on USA Latin Grammy Awards
2011	Akon, DJ Felli Fel, Pitbull & Jermaine Dupri	Boomerang	Co-writer (So So Def/IDJMG)
2011	Super Junior	Be My Girl	Producer/co-writer (Mr. Simple, SM Entertainment) ***Album has sold over 550,000 copies
2011	French Montana feat. Jadakiss, Three 6 Mafia, P-Dub	Self-Made Man	Co-producer/co-writer (Island/Def Jam Recordings)
2011	Day26	We Own The Night	Co-writer (Unreleased, Atlantic Records)
2011	The Stunners	LOUDer (single)	Co-producer/co-writer (Unreleased, Universal Republic Records)
2010	Pretty Ricky	Cookie Cutter (1st single)	Producer/co-writer (Bluestars 2)
2010	Trina feat. P-Dub	Gucci Shoe Shoppin'	Producer/co-writer (Amazin', SNS/EMI) ***100,000+ Albums sold, Album peaked #13 Billboard 200, #1 Billboard Independent Albums Chart, #2 Billboard Rap Albums Chart
2009	Twista feat. Akon	On Top (2nd single)	Producer/Co-writer (Category F5, EMI/GMG)
2009	Ace Hood feat. P-Dub	Trigga Finger	Co-writer (We The Best Music Group/Def Jam Recordings)
2009	J.R. Writer feat. P-Dub	Jesse James	Producer/co-writer (Cinecrack, Babygrande Records)
2008	50 Cent	I'm On It Like That	Producer (Elephant in the Sand, G-Unit/Interscope Records)
2008	The D.E.Y.	Bendecida Mi Nacion	Co-producer (The D.E.Y. Has Come LP, EPIC)
2008	Hell Rell	Realest Nigga Doin' It, Push 'em Back	Producer (Black Mask, Black Gloves, Babygrande Records)
2008	40 Cal.	Go, We Go Hard, Young Skeme, Realer	Producer (Mooga, The Yellow Tape, Trigger Happy 2, Caroline Distribution)
2007	DukeDaGod	The Corner	Co-producer (More Than Music Vol. 2, Koch Records)
2007	J.R. Writer	Live from the Kitchen, Critically Acclaimed, Ima Hustla, I Gotta Make It	Co-producer (DukeDaGod Presents JR Writer: Writer's Block Pt. 4, Asylum Records)
2007	Ghostface Killah	When Death Comes	Producer (White Label)
