= For the Hell of It =

Studio album by Hell Rell
- Released: September 25, 2007
- Recorded: 2006–07
- Genre: Hip hop
- Length: 1:00:06
- Label: Diplomats; Koch
- Producer: Cam'ron (exec.); DukeDaGod (also exec.); Hell Rell (also exec.); AblazeDaArchitek; AraabMuzik; Dame Grease; DVLP; Knoxville; Max Perry; Oddz N Endz; Tracsquad Movement; Q Butta; Rice; Yonny

Hell Rell chronology
For the Hell of It (2007)	Black Mask, Black Gloves (2008)

Professional ratings
Review scores
Source	Rating
AllMusic	3/5 stars
HipHopDX	2.5/5
RapReviews	7/10

For the Hell of It is the debut solo studio album by American rapper Hell Rell. It was released on September 25, 2007, via Diplomat Records & Koch Records. Production was handled by Dame Grease, AraabMuzik, DukeDaGod, AblazeDaArchitek, DVLP, Knoxville, Max Perry, Oddz N Endz, Tracsquad Movement, Q Butta, Rice, Yonny, and Hell Rell himself. It features guest appearances from Cam'ron, J.R. Writer, Juelz Santana, Styles P, Young Dro, Karen Civil, Asia & Ashley. The album peaked at number 55 on the Billboard 200, number 10 on the Top R&B/Hip-Hop Albums, and number 5 on both Top Rap Albums and Independent Albums.

== Track listing ==
No.	Title	Writer(s)	Producer(s)	Length
1.	"Intro"	Durell Mohammed; Abraham Orellana; George Moore	araabMUZIK	2:03
2.	"Do It for the Hustlers"	Mohammed; David Stokes; Moore	Knoxville	4:15
3.	"Paperboy"	Mohammed; Antwan Jackson	AblazeDaArchitek	4:06
4.	"Deep in Love"	Mohammed; Moore	Hell Rell; DukeDaGod	3:19
5.	"You Can Count on Me"	Mohammed; Moore	Hell Rell; DukeDaGod	3:39
6.	"Streets Gonna Love Me" (featuring Asia & Ashley)	Mohammed; Asia K. DosReis-Whitehead; Damon Blackman	Dame Grease	3:47
7.	"Life in the Ghetto" (featuring Karen Civil)	Mohammed; Karen Civil; Moore	Hell Rell; DukeDaGod	3:41
8.	"Hardest Out" (featuring Styles P)	Mohammed; David Styles; Blackman	Dame Grease	4:37
9.	"You Know What It Is" (featuring Young Dro)	Mohammed; D'Juan Hart; Blackman	Dame Grease	4:16
10.	"Show Off"	Mohammed; Micah Scott	TracSquad Movement / TracSquad Beats	4:15
11.	"I'm the Shit" (featuring Cam'ron)	Mohammed; Cameron Giles; Orellana; Moore	araabMUZIK	3:41
12.	"Respect Me" (featuring J.R. Writer)	Mohammed; Rusty Brito; Orellana; Moore	araabMUZIK	3:55
13.	"I Shall Proceed (Rep the Set)"	Mohammed; Bigram Zayas	Develop	3:20
14.	"Always Wanted to Be a Gangsta"	Mohammed; Maxwell Smart	Max Perry	3:39
15.	"Where You From" (featuring Juelz Santana)	Mohammed; LaRon James; Justin Harris; Nicholas Lazzeri	Odds And Ends	3:29
16.	"I Ain't Playin Wit 'Em"	Mohammed; Blackman	Dame Grease	4:04
Total length:				1:00:06

Best Buy bonus tracks
No.	Title	Writer(s)	Producer(s)	Length
17.	"187"	Mohammed; Ronald Ferebee Jr.	Young Yonny	4:04
18.	"Bars From Hell"	Mohammed	Rice	4:04
19.	"Ruga Rell"	Mohammed; Terrance Sanchez	Q Butta	4:12

== Charts ==
Chart (2007)	Peak position
US Billboard 200	55
US Top R&B/Hip-Hop Albums (Billboard)	10
US Top Rap Albums (Billboard)	5
US Independent Albums (Billboard)	5
