= Book of Ezekiel (album) =

Studio album by Freekey Zekey
- Released: July 24, 2007
- Recorded: 2006–2007
- Studio: Legendary Studios (New York, NY); Santana's World Studios (New Jersey)
- Genre: Hip hop
- Length: 1:00:47
- Label: Diplomat; Asylum
- Producer: Cam'ron (exec.); Freekey Zekey (exec.); D.A.; J.A.; The Firemen; Ash; Carmelo Torres; C-Dub; Dramasetters; Flava Beats; Freebass; Spectacular; StreetRunner; Tito Green

Professional ratings
Review scores
Source	Rating
AllMusic	3.5/5 stars
HipHopDX	2.5/5 stars
RapReviews	5.5/10 stars
The Source	2.5/5 stars

Book of Ezekiel is the debut and only solo studio album by American rapper Freekey Zekey of the Diplomats. It was released on July 24, 2007 via Diplomat Records and Asylum Records, and features guest appearances from Juelz Santana, Cam'ron, Jim Jones, Hell Rell, J.R. Writer, Sen, Tobb and Ash.

== Track listing ==
No.	Title	Writer(s)	Producer(s)	Length
1.	"Intro"	E. Jiles; L. Wiggins; T. Jackson	Dramasetters	1:47
2.	"Daddy Back" (featuring Cam'ron & Juelz Santana)	E. Jiles; L. James; C. Giles; J. Adams	J.A.	4:51
3.	"Hater What You Lookin' At"	E. Jiles; J. Contella; T. Fredrick	Freebase	3:57
4.	"Livin' It Up" (featuring Tobb)	E. Jiles; S. Lockwood; T. Shuford; A. Williams	Flava Beats	3:12
5.	"Skit 1"	E. Jiles		1:26
6.	"Shoot 'Em Up" (featuring Hell Rell & J.R. Writer)	E. Jiles; D. Mohammed; R. Brito; E. Brito; L. Wazner	Spectacular	4:35
7.	"Like This" (featuring Sen)	E. Jiles; S. Lockwood; D. Hemphill	D.A.	2:43
8.	"Killem Killem" (featuring Juelz Santana)	E. Jiles; L. James; J. Adams	J.A.	3:23
9.	"Bottom Bitch"	E. Jiles; D. Powell	The Firemen	3:35
10.	"Where the Dutch" (featuring Tobb)	E. Jiles; T. Fredricks; T. Shuford	Tito Green	4:31
11.	"Skit 2"	E. Jiles		2:18
12.	"Fly Fitted"	E. Jiles; D. Powell	The Firemen	3:32
13.	"730 Dip Dip" (featuring Jim Jones & Ash)	E. Jiles; A. Middleton; C. Torres	Carmelo Torres; Ash (co.)	4:11
14.	"Steph" (featuring Sen)	E. Jiles; S. Lockwood; D. Hemphill	D.A.	4:13
15.	"Crunk'd Up"	E. Jiles; C. Walker, Jr.	C-Dub	1:45
16.	"Skit 3"	E. Jiles		2:12
17.	"Streets"	E. Jiles; A. Middleton	Ash	4:11
18.	"My Life" (featuring Sen)	E. Jiles; N. Warwar	StreetRunner	4:25
Total length:				1:00:47

Notes

- Hater What You Lookin' At features additional vocals from Tito Green
- Livin' It Up features additional vocals from Karen Civil
- Streets features additional vocals from Nicky Neily

== Chart history ==
Chart (2007)	Peak position
US Billboard 200	154
US Top R&B/Hip-Hop Albums (Billboard)	23
US Top Rap Albums (Billboard)	8
