= I.N.F.O. =

American record producer (born 1982)

- Born: John Christopher; 1982 (age 43–44)
- Origin: Pittsburgh, Pennsylvania, United States
- Genres: Hip hop; R&B; Pop; Urban
- Occupations: Entrepreneur, Producer
- Instruments: Keyboard, Sampler, Drum Machine, Pro Tools, Logic Pro
- Years active: 2006–present
- Labels: Money Mack Music, Cash Money Records
- Website: pmpworldwide.com/infoproductions

John Christopher (born 1982), known as I.N.F.O. (aka I.N.F.O. Productions) is an American record producer, born in Pittsburgh, Pennsylvania, United States, who specializes in Hip hop/R&B/Pop. He has been known to work in the production duo "I.N.F.O. & NOVA". Some of the notable artists I.N.F.O. has worked with include Chris Brown, Cam'ron and The Diplomats, Birdman, Young Money Juelz Santana, Fabolous, Trae, Slim Thug, Paul Wall, Lloyd, Rich Boy, Master P., Lil Wayne, B.G., among many others. I.N.F.O.'s style is known to contain original compositions with heavy synth laden melodies and 808 drums. His more recent production can be identified with a vocal tag saying "INFO" at the beginning and ending of songs. In 2010, I.N.F.O. joined Cash Money Records as an in-house producer. I.N.F.O. also boasts a co-publishing deal with Money Mack, an entity of Cash Money Records, which is administered by Universal Music Publishing Group.

== Production credits ==
* co-produced by Nova
# mixing contributions

=== 2006 ===
- Cam'ron – Killa Season

"Get'em Daddy Remix" (Ft. Jim Jones, J.R. Writer, Hell Rell)
"You Gotta Love It" (Ft. Max B.)

- Cam'ron Presents DukeDaGod: Dipset – The Movement Moves On

"Killa Season" (ft. Cam'ron and JR Writer) Bonus track

- Purple City – The Purple Album

"Bank Roll" (Ft. B.G. & 334 Mobb)

- J.R. Writer – History In The Making

"Take Notes"

- Ransom – Pain & Glory

"Ransom Note" (Ft. Big Mike)

- Trae – Restless

"Real Talk" #
"Restless" (Ft. Young Noble) #

=== 2007 ===
- The Diplomats – More Than Music Volume 2

"Gladiators" (Ft. Juelz Santana, Hell Rell, JR Writer, 40 Cal, Bezel) *
"Street Pharmacist" (Ft. Hell Rell and A-Mafia) *

- Fabolous – From Nothin' to Somethin'

"This is Family" (Ft. Joe Budden, Ransom, Freck Billionaire, Paul Cain, and Red Cafe) * co-producer

- Freeky Zekey – Book Of Ezekiel

"Where The Dutch"

- Jody Breeze – Best Kept Secret

"Hard Out Here" *

- Master P. – Miller Boyz/Hip Hop History

"My Life" (Ft. Lil' Romeo)

- Trae – Life Goes On

"Nothin' To a Boss" (Ft. Slim Thug) *
"Ghetto Queen" (Ft. Lloyd, Rich Boy) *
"I'm Good" (Ft. Jody Breeze) *
"The Truth" *

=== 2008 ===
- Jim Jones – Harlem's American Gangster

"The King" *

- Jay-Z – American Gangster No Fillers (Re-Mix Tape)

"14 tracks" *

- Peedi Crakk – Cheers To The New Year

"Brand New Start"

- Lil Wayne – Pre-Carter III

"Chalk It Out" (Ft. Brisco) #

- Rich Boy – Bigger Than The Mayor

"Ghetto Queen" *

- Trae – Diary of the Truth

"Come Thru" (Ft. Hurricane Chris) *

- Hell Rell – Top Gunna

"Put it in the Bag" *

- Yung Redd – Eviction Notice

"Airplane High" *

- Serius Jones – Serius Bizness

"J. One S." *
"Nature" *

- Freck Billionaire – Leaked

"Holiday (Ft. Bobby Ewing)" *

- Max B. – Bloomberg Series

"I'm Kinda High"

=== 2009 ===
- Razah – TBA (Carter IV Leaks Mixtape)

"Speechless (Ft. Lil Wayne)" *

- Razah – I Am Razah

"Let the Music Play"

- Memphis Bleek

"Real Nigga Shit"

- Hell Rell – Get In Line Or Get Lined Up

"If I Die" *

- Cam'ron – Crime Pays

"Cookin Up" *

- Paul Wall – Fast Life

"Pressin' The Buttons" (Ft. Lil Keke & Trae) *

- Serius Jones – Life is Serius

"Greatness" *

- DukeDaGod/Cam'ron – The Last Dragon

"Mafia Day" (Ft. A-Mafia)

- J.R. Writer – Cinecrack 1.5

"I'm From Harlem Baby"
"Work Musik"

- Gorilla Zoe – Diamonds & Dope

"Sauced Up Splashed Out"

- Young Money – Gudda Gudda – Guddaville

"I'm Gone" (Ft. Gudda Gudda, Tyga & Lil Flip)

- Gorilla Zoe – Monkey Business 2

"Better Than Me"

- Birdman – Pricele$$

"Been About Money"

=== 2010 ===
- T-Pain Presents: Nappy Boy All-Stars Vol. 1

"Cadillac Musik" (Ft. Young Cash) *

- OJ Da Juiceman – O.R.A.N.G.E.

"Money Hoes and Jewelry Intro" *

- Gorilla Zoe – Greatest Zoe on Earth

"Intro"

- Young Money – Jae Millz – The Flood

"Ride Away" *

- Young Money – Jae Millz – The Flood Continues

"Take Me There"

- Birdman – Fetti Holmes Pt 2

"Junior Doin' Time"

- Gudda Gudda – Back 2 Guddaville

"Back2Guddaville (Title Track)" *
"Purple Stuff" *

- Tay Dizm – Point Em Out

"Everything"

- Jae Millz – Dead Presidents

"Legggooo"

- OJ Da Juiceman – Boulder Crest Day

"Kush & Lean"

- Fabolous – There Is No Competition 2: The Grieving Music EP

"The Wake"
"Body Bags" (Feat. Cam'ron and Vado) *

- Young Money – Jae Millz – The Flood Never Ended

"Take Me There" (full song)
"Ride Away" (full song) *

- The Diplomats – D.I.P. Agenda

"Call Out"

=== 2011 ===
- Birdman – Leaked Track – T.B.A.

"Bitch I'm a Stunna"

- Jae Millz – Potent Music

"I'm So High"

- Chris Brown – Boy in Detention

"Spend It All"

- Birdman – Billionaire Minds

"Priceless Life" Feat Mack Maine & Dre of Cool n Dre *

- Tay Dizm – TBA Leaked Track

"The Way I Juke"

- Fabolous – There is No Competition 3

"Death Comes in 3's"

=== 2012 ===
- Jae Millz

"Hearing Voices"

- Ransom – Winter's Here

"Advil and Sunshades"
"Winters Here"

=== 2013 ===
- Gudda Gudda – Red Rum

"Money Talkin" Feat Boo
"Psychopath" Feat Jae Millz

- Chase N. Cashe

"Ways of a G" *

- Jae Millz – Dead Presidents 2

"Potent Music" *
"Who Dont" Feat Twista

- OJ Da Juiceman – Juice World 2

"Where Ya Been Juice"

- Rich Gang – The Compilation Album

"Everyday" Feat Birdman, Busta Rhymes, Cory Gunz and Mystikal
"Paint Tha Town" Feat The Game, Birdman and Lil Wayne

- Jae Millz – Reality Of the Situation

"Thats My Price" *

=== 2014 ===
- Mack Maine – Single

"Pussy Whipped"

=== 2015 ===
- Paul Wall – Slab God

"Ridin' Homie" Feat Trae

=== 2016 ===
- Rich Gang – Single

"Hustle" Feat Birdman, Neno Calvin, Ralo

- Birdman – Ms. Gladys

"Still Hot"
"Breathe"

- Jakk Jo – Cash Money Records Artist

"Outchea"
"Get Mines"
"Blueface 100's"
"Alot Of"

- Ralo – Diary of the Streets 2

"Lil Nigga" Feat Birdman, Neno Calvin

- Neno Calvin – Calvinism 3

"Come Up"

- Philthy Rich FOD – Hood Rich 4

"Playing" Feat Birdman

=== 2017 ===
- Neno Calvin – Calvinism 3 Reloaded

"Just Might Have To"
"One Shot, One Time"

=== 2019 ===
- Cam’ron – Purple Haze 2

“Just Be Honest”

=== 2021 ===
- Dave East

"You Gotta Hate Us”

=== 2022 ===
- Ralo – Political Prisonser

"You and Me”

=== Motion pictures / media / television ===
- Killa Season The Movie (2006)
- 2006 NBA Finals, Score, ABC Television, (2006)
- Cam'ron – Down And Out/Get Em Daddy Music Video (2006)
- Cam'ron – Get Em Daddy Remix Music Video (2006)
- NBA Ballers Phenom TV Commercial, MidwayGames (2006)
- AND1 Global Invasion, Score, ESPN (2006)
- Scratch Magazine (2006)
- XXL Magazine (2006)
- DukeDaGod – More Than Music/Street Pharmacist Music Video (2007)
- Master P – My Life Music Video (2007)
- Trae, Slim Thug – Nothin' To a Boss Music Video (2008)
- Fox Sports Network (2008)
- Cam'ron – Cookin Up Music Video (2009)
- Memphis Bleek – Real Nigga Shit Music Video (2009)
- MTV Mixtape Daily Commercial (2010)
- Birdman – Bigger Than Life Photo Shoot – Videography (2011)
- Chris Brown – Spend It All Music Video (2011)
- Fabolous – There is No Competition 3 Trailer (2011)
- MTV – Various Shows Background Music (2013)
- Power Television Show Starz Network (2014)
- Trae Da Truth Cartoon Series (2015)
- Birdman – Still Hot Music Video (2016)
- BET – Music Moguls Television Show – Season 1 (2016)
- Birdman – Breathe Music Video (2016)
- Neno Calvin – Come Up Music Video (2016)
- Birdman and Philthy Rich FOD – Playin' Music Video (2017)

=== Video games ===
- NBA Ballers: Phenom (2006)

"9 instrumentals"
