= Diplomatic Immunity (The Diplomats album) =

Studio album by The Diplomats
- Released: March 25, 2003
- Recorded: 2002–03
- Studios: Galaxy Studios (Newark, NJ); Baseline Studios (New York, NY); Quad Recording Studios (New York, NY); Sony Music Studios (New York, NY); The Hit Factory (New York, NY)
- Genres: East Coast hip hop; chipmunk soul
- Length: 1:47:09
- Labels: Island Def Jam; Diplomats; Roc-A-Fella
- Producers: Cam'ron (exec.); Jim Jones (exec.); Brian "All Day" Miller; Charlemagne; DR Period; Hiroshima; Just Blaze; Kanye West; KLC; Mafia Boy; Paperchase Inc.; Ralph Random; Spike n Jamahl; The Heatmakerz; E-Bass (co.)

The Diplomats chronology
Diplomatic Immunity (2003)	Diplomatic Immunity 2 (2004)

Singles from Diplomatic Immunity
- 1. "Bout It Bout It..., Part III" Released: 2002; 2. "Built This City" Released: January 14, 2003; 3. "Dipset Anthem" Released: July 22, 2003

Professional ratings
Review scores
Source	Rating
AllMusic	2/5 stars
HipHopDX	3/5
RapReviews	4.5/10
The Guardian	3/5 stars

Diplomatic Immunity is the debut studio album by American hip hop group The Diplomats, released via The Island Def Jam Music Group, Jay-Z's Roc-A-Fella Records, and Cam'ron's Diplomat Records.

The album debuted at number 8 on the Billboard 200 and topped the Top R&B/Hip-Hop Albums chart, selling 92,000 copies in its first week in the United States. By May 19, 2003, it was certified Gold by the Recording Industry Association of America for selling 500,000 units in the US alone. In 2012, Complex named the album one of the classic albums of its decade.

== Background ==
After the release of group leader Cam'ron's third studio album Come Home with Me for Roc-A-Fella Records, the collective composed of Jim Jones, Juelz Santana and Freekey Zekey teamed up to release their first collaborative effort.

Originally scheduled for a March 4, 2003 release, the album's release date was delayed to March 11, 2003. After the release date was again delayed, the album was ultimately released March 25, 2003. Recording sessions took place at Baseline Studios, Quad Recording Studios, Sony Music Studios and The Hit Factory in New York City, and at Galaxy Studios in Newark, New Jersey. Production was handled by The Heatmakerz, DR Period, Just Blaze, Brian "All Day" Miller, Charlemagne, Hiroshima, Jamahl, Kanye West, KLC, Mafia Boy, Paperchase Inc, Ralph Random, Spike and E-Bass, with Cam'ron and Jim Jones serving as executive producers. It features guest appearances from DMX, Freeway, Hell Rell (who was not a member of The Diplomats that time), Master P, Monique Chandler, Shaniqua Williams, Toya and Un Kasa. The album spawned three singles: "Bout It Bout It..., Part III", "Built This City" and "Dipset Anthem".

Diplomatic Immunity is the only album by The Diplomats under Island Def Jam and Roc-A-Fella. In 2004, The Diplomats signed to Koch Records for distribution, though the group stayed on Diplomat Records.

Cam'ron described the album as "9/11 music", and it antagonised the country in the attack's aftermath while adopting its imagery. On "Gangsta", Juelz Santana compares himself to Osama bin Laden, and an original version of "I Love You" made references to Mohamed Atta.

== Track listing ==
Disc 1
No.	Title	Writer(s)	Producer(s)	Length
1.	"Un Kasa" (Cam'Ron featuring Un Kasa)	Cameron Giles; Antonio Wilder; Brian Miller; Kanye West; Robert Bryson; William Wilson	Brian "All Day" Miller; Kanye West; E-Bass (co.)	3:38
2.	"Juelz Santana (Interlude)" (Freekey Zekey & Jimmy Jones)			0:56
3.	"Who I Am" (Juelz Santana)	LaRon James; Gregory Green; Sean Thomas; Giles; Phil Hurtt; Walter Sigler	The Heatmakerz	4:19
4.	"Ground Zero" (Cam'Ron, Juelz Santana & Jimmy Jones)	James; Giles; Joseph Jones; Kenneth Cunningham; Jamahl Rye; Kip Winger	Spike; Jamahl	5:13
5.	"Real Niggas (Interlude)" (Freekey Zekey featuring Monique Chandler)			1:28
6.	"Real Niggas" (Cam'Ron, Juelz Santana & Jimmy Jones)	Giles; James; Jones; Darryl Pittman; Kenneth Gamble; Leon Huff	DR Period	3:46
7.	"Have You Seen Juelz Santana (Interlude)" (Freekey Zekey featuring Shaniqua Williams)			0:44
8.	"More Than Music" (Juelz Santana)	James; Green; Thomas; Giles; Robert Dukes; Eddie Levert	The Heatmakerz	4:08
9.	"Beautiful Noise" (Cam'Ron & Jimmy Jones)	Jones; Giles; Henri Charlemagne; Michael Durio	Charlemagne; E-Bass (co.)	4:39
10.	"Dipset Anthem" (also known as "Gangsta Music") (Cam'Ron & Juelz Santana)	James; Giles; Green; Thomas; Sam Dees	The Heatmakerz	4:09
11.	"Hey Ma (Remix)" (Cam'Ron & Juelz Santana featuring Toya)	Giles; James; Pittman; Lionel Richie	DR Period; Mafia Boy	5:17
12.	"Hell Rell (Interlude)" (Cam'Ron & Freekey Zekey featuring Hell Rell)			2:03
13.	"This Is What I Do" (Cam'Ron featuring Hell Rell)	Giles; Durell Mohammed; Green; Thomas	The Heatmakerz	4:05
14.	"Gangsta" (Cam'Ron & Juelz Santana)	James; Ralph Cheuveret	Ralph Random	5:14
15.	"Hell Rell Freestyle"			1:46

Disc 2
No.	Title	Writer(s)	Producer(s)	Length
16.	"I Really Mean It" (Cam'Ron & Jimmy Jones)	Giles; Jones; Justin Smith; Joseph Jefferson; Charles Simmons	Just Blaze	4:21
17.	"My Love" (Juelz Santana featuring Freeway)	James; Leslie Pridgen; Green; Thomas; James Ingram	The Heatmakerz	3:22
18.	"I Love You" (Cam'Ron & Juelz Santana)	James; Giles; Green; Thomas; Jerry Butler; William Butler	The Heatmakerz; E-Bass (co.)	4:11
19.	"Purple Haze" (Cam'Ron)	Giles; Green; Thomas; Dorothy Moore	The Heatmakerz	4:38
20.	"The First" (Cam'Ron, Juelz Santana & Jimmy Jones)	Jones; Giles; James; Jeff Tyzik	Hiroshima	4:55
21.	"Juelz Santana the Great" (Juelz Santana)	James; Green; Thomas; Giles	The Heatmakerz	4:57
22.	"DJ Enuff Freestyle" (Cam'Ron, Juelz Santana & Jimmy Jones)	Giles; James; Jones; Green; Thomas; Earl Randle; Renee Kirk	The Heatmakerz	5:11
23.	"What's Really Good" (Cam'Ron, Juelz Santana & Jimmy Jones featuring DMX)	Giles; Jones; James; Earl Simmons; Aquanza Jones	Paperchase Inc.; E-Bass (co.)	6:02
24.	"I'm Ready" (Cam'Ron, Juelz Santana & Jimmy Jones)	James; Jones; Giles; Green; Thomas; Barbara Mason	The Heatmakerz	4:41
25.	"Bout It Bout It..., Part III" (Cam'Ron & Jimmy Jones featuring Master P)	Giles; Jones; Percy Miller; Craig Lawson; Mia Young	KLC	5:20
26.	"Built This City" (Cam'Ron, Juelz Santana & Jimmy Jones)	Giles; Jones; James; Smith; Martin Page; Bernie Taupin; Peter Wolf; Dennis Lambert	Just Blaze	6:03
27.	"Let's Go" (Cam'Ron & Juelz Santana)	Giles; Green; Thomas; Marvin Gaye; Ed Townsend	The Heatmakerz	2:03
Total length:				1:47:09

Notes

- Built This City features an uncredited guest appearance from Hell Rell

Sample credits

- Track 1 contains a sample from "Why Don't You Make Up Your Mind" written by Robert Bryson and William Wilson.
- Track 3 contains elements of The O'Jays recording "Who Am I" written by Phil Hurtt and Bunny Sigler.
- Track 4 contains samples from the Winger recording "Headed for a Heartbreak" written by Kip Winger.
- Track 6 contains a sample from "Cry Together" written by Kenneth Gamble and Leon Huff as performed by The O'Jays.
- Track 8 contains a sample of "Help (Somebody Please)" written by Robert Dukes and Eddie Levert as performed by The O'Jays.
- Track 9 contains an interpolation of "Closer" written by Michael Durio.
- Track 10 contains a sample of "One In A Million" written by Sam Dees as performed by Sanchez.
- Track 11 contains excerpts from "Easy Like Sunday Morning" written by Lionel Richie as performed by the Commodores.
- Track 16 contains a sample from the Major Harris recording "I Got Over Love" written by Joseph Jefferson and Charles Simmons.
- Track 17 contains a sample of "Look What You've Done" written by James Ingram as performed by The Moments.
- Track 18 contains elements of "I Stand Accused" written by William E. Butler and Jerry Butler.
- Track 19 contains elements of "Too Blind To See" written and performed by Dorothy Moore.
- Track 20 contains a sample from "Let There Be Light" written by Jeff Tyzik, and portions of "1st of tha Month".
- Track 22 contains a sample of "Mirror Of My Soul" written by Earl Randle and Renee Kirk as performed by O. V. Wright.
- Track 24 contains vocal excerpts and samples from "Yes, I'm Ready" written and performed by Barbara Mason.
- Track 25 contains a sample from "Bout It Bout It II" written by Craig Lawson, Percy Miller and Mia Young as performed by Master P.
- Track 26 contains a sample of "We Built This City" written by Martin Page, Bernie Taupin, Peter Wolf and Dennis Lambert as performed by Starship.
- Track 27 contains a sample from "Let's Get It On" written by Marvin Gaye and Ed Townsend as performed by Marvin Gaye.

== Personnel ==
- Cameron "Cam'Ron" Giles – vocals (tracks: 1, 4, 6, 9–11, 13–16, 18–20, 22–27), executive producer, A&R
- LaRon "Juelz Santana" James – vocals (tracks: 3, 4, 6, 8, 10, 11, 14, 15, 17, 18, 20–24, 26, 27), A&R
- Joseph "Jimmy" Jones – vocals (tracks: 2, 4, 6, 9, 15, 16, 20, 21–26), executive producer, A&R, management
- Ezekiel "Freekey Zekey" Giles – vocals (tracks: 2, 5, 7, 12)
- Durell "Hell Rell" Mohammed – vocals (tracks: 12, 13, 15, 26)
- Antonio "Un Kasa" Wilder – vocals (track 1)
- Monique Chandler – vocals (track 5)
- Shaniqua Williams – vocals (track 7)
- LaToya "Toya" Rodriguez – vocals (track 11)
- Leslie "Freeway" Pridgen – vocals (track 17)
- Earl "DMX" Simmons – vocals (track 23)
- Percy "Master P" Miller – vocals (track 25)
- Brian "All Day" Miller – producer (track 1)
- Kanye West – producer (track 1)
- Gregory "Rsonist" Green – producer (tracks: 3, 8, 10, 13, 17–19, 21, 22, 24, 27)
- Sean "Thrilla" Thomas – producer (tracks: 3, 8, 10, 13, 17–19, 21, 22, 24, 27)
- Kenneth "Spike" Cunningham – producer (track 4)
- Jamahl Rashid Rye – producer (track 4)
- Darryl "DR Period" Pittman – producer (tracks: 6, 11)
- Henri Charlemagne – producer (track 9)
- Mafia Boy – producer (track 11)
- Ralph "Random" Cheuveret – producer (track 14)
- Justin "Just Blaze" Smith – producer (tracks: 16, 26)
- DJ HirOshima – producer (track 20)
- Aquanza "Paperchase Inc." Jones – producer (track 23)
- Craig "KLC" Lawson – producer (track 25)
- Eric "E-Bass" Johnson – co-producer (tracks: 1, 9, 18, 23)
- George "DukeDaGod" Moore – recording (tracks: 1, 4, 6, 8, 13, 21), A&R
- Shane "Bermuda" Woodley – recording (tracks: 3, 9, 17, 18, 20)
- Carlisle Young – recording (tracks: 10, 19), mixing (tracks: 1, 3, 6, 8, 9, 18–22, 27)
- Eric "Ibo" Butler – recording (tracks: 11, 14, 22, 23), mixing (tracks: 4, 10, 11, 13, 14, 16, 17, 23–25)
- Gimel "Young Guru" Keaton – recording (tracks: 16, 24–26), mixing (track 26)
- Tony Dawsey – mastering
- Akisia Grigsby – art direction
- Jonathan Mannion – photography
- Tara Podolsky – A&R
- Darcell Lawrence – A&R
- Ramses Francois – A&R assistant
- Travis Cumming – A&R assistant
- Jamel George – A&R assistant

== Charts ==
=== Weekly charts ===
Chart (2003)	Peak position
Canadian Albums (Nielsen SoundScan)	85
US Billboard 200	8
US Top R&B/Hip-Hop Albums (Billboard)	1

=== Year-end charts ===
Chart (2003)	Position
US Billboard 200	196
US Top R&B/Hip-Hop Albums (Billboard)	44

== Certifications ==
Region	Certification	Certified units/sales
United States (RIAA)	Gold	500,000^{^}
^{^} Shipments figures based on certification alone.
