= Black Mask, Black Gloves =

Studio album by Hell Rell
- Released: July 22, 2008
- Recorded: 2007–08
- Genre: Hip hop
- Label: Top Gunnas; Babygrande
- Producer: AraabMuzik; GoodWill & MGI; Hassidity; Hell Rell; Kajmir Royale; Manti

Hell Rell chronology
For the Hell of It (2007)	Black Mask, Black Gloves (2008)	Get in Line or Get Lined Up (2009)

Alternative cover
- Black Mask, Black Gloves - The Ruga Edition

Professional ratings
Review scores
Source	Rating
AllMusic	3.5/5 stars
IGN	7/10
Okayplayer	(84/100)
PlanetUrban	6/10 stars
RapReviews	5.5/10

Black Mask, Black Gloves is the second solo studio album by American rapper Hell Rell. It was released on July 22, 2008, via Babygrande Records and Hell Rell's Top Gunnas Entertainment. Production was handled by AraabMuzik, Kajmir Royale, Hassiditty, GoodWill & MGI, Manti, and Hell Rell himself. It features guest appearances from J.R. Writer and Sen City. The album debuted at number 131 on the Billboard 200, selling 5,390 copies in its first week. The first single released from the album was "Get Ready".

== Track listing ==
No.	Title	Writer(s)	Producer(s)	Length
1.	"Intro (Black Gloves)"	Durell Mohammed; Abraham Orellana	araabMUZIK	2:13
2.	"Get Ready"	Mohammed; Orellana	araabMUZIK	3:54
3.	"Take an Oath"	Mohammed; Derrick Ridley	Manti	3:09
4.	"Think of a Problem"	Mohammed; Orellana	araabMUZIK	3:38
5.	"Come on Baby Girl"	Mohammed; H. Harper	Hassiditty	2:41
6.	"Realest Nigga Doin' It"	Mohammed; Henri Lanz	MGI	3:24
7.	"True Colors"	Mohammed; Abraham Gaskin	Kajmir Royale	3:04
8.	"I Luv Stuntin'" (featuring Sen City)	Mohammed; Seneca Lockwood; Gaskin	Kajmir Royale	3:21
9.	"What Up?" (featuring J.R. Writer)	Mohammed; Rusty Brito; Harper	Hassiditty; Hell Rell	4:25
10.	"Push 'Em Back"	Mohammed; Will Rappaport; Lanz	GoodWill & MGI	3:48
11.	"Rumors"	Mohammed; Orellana	araabMUZIK	3:07
12.	"Million Dollar Plan"	Mohammed; Gaskin	Kajmir Royale	3:17

== Personnel ==
- Durrell "Hell Rell" Mohammed – vocals, producer (track 9), executive producer
- Seneca "Sen City" Lockwood – vocals (track 8)
- Rusty "J.R. Writer" Brito – vocals (track 9)
- Abraham "AraabMuzik" Orellana – producer (tracks: 1, 2, 4, 11)
- Derrick "Manti" Ridley – producer (track 3)
- Hassiditty Harper – producer (tracks: 5, 9), executive producer, A&R
- Henri "MGI" Lanz – producer (tracks: 6, 10)
- Abraham "Kajmir Royale" Gaskin – producer (tracks: 7, 8, 12)
- Saga Legin – recording, mixing
- Mark B. Christensen – mastering
- Chuck Wilson – executive producer
- Miami Kaos – artwork, design
- Ben Dotson – product management
- Willy Friedman – product management
- Jesse Stone – product management, marketing
- George "DukeDaGod" Moore – promotion

== Charts ==
Chart (2008)	Peak position
US Billboard 200	131
US Independent Albums	20
US Top R&B/Hip-Hop Albums	18
US Top Rap Albums	9
