= Jay Bezel =

American rapper (born 1983)

- Also known as: The Philadelphia Beast; Bezel; Bezel the Beast; Big Bezzy
- Born: P. Corley III; April 13, 1983 (age 43); Philadelphia, Pennsylvania, U.S.
- Genres: Hip Hop
- Occupation: Rapper
- Labels: Diplomat; Sure Shot; Doe Stackaz Ent.

Jay Bezel (born April 13, 1983), also known as Bezel, is a Philadelphia-born rapper. He also has lived in New York as well as Atlanta.

Bezel started his career in Philly hitting the streets with mixtapes and doing local DVDs. He quickly made a name for himself. He later signed with Cam'ron and The Diplomats' label, Diplomat Records in 2003. He released a few solo mixtapes while with the Diplomats(Phila. Beast Vol. 1 & 2, Certified Gangsta and Savior 2 Da City), appeared on various Diplomat mixtapes and Diplomat albums such as Juelz Santana's "What's The Game's Been Missing"....Duke Da God's "More Than Music Vol. 1 & 2, and Jim Jones "On My Way To Church" where he was the driving force behind such singles as "Best Out and "Certified Gangstas". Bezel's The Philadelphia Beast Vol. 2 was released to stores on January 30, 2007, and featured appearances from Lil Wayne and Juelz Santana. Later that year, Bezel teamed up with fellow Philadelphia-area rappers Tone Trump and Hedonis da Amazon to produce an antiviolence single entitled "Every Day Is Crazy."

After parting ways with Juelz Santana and renouncing his affiliation with DipSet/Skull Gang, Bezel started his own movement called "Doe Stackaz Ent.". Bezel and his partner Alpha has been doing it independently and hitting the streets hard. Bezel released his first project (without a DipSet affiliation) in 2009 entitled "Phila. Beast Vol.4 (Life After Death of the Set) hosted by DJ Lazy K and DJ Alamo (Doe Stackaz Ent.'s official DJ). This mixtape was a huge success for Bezel. This mixtape included features from artist such as Nicki Minaj, Pusha T, Soulja Boy and more.

In February 2008, Bezel signed a contract with Focus Entertainment. He has also recently collaborated with fellow Dipset member 40 Cal on a new track about the rap collective's possible demise. Bezel helped produce Lil Wayne's album Tha Carter III, and also made an appearance on Sin's album, The Supreme Poet.

== Discography ==
=== Mixtapes ===
- The Philadelphia Beast
- The Philadelphia Beast Vol.2
- Certified Gangsta Mixtape
- Savior 2 da City
- The Philadelphia Beast Vol.3
- Philly Raised Me (2013)
- Back 2 Rap
- Money Bag Mob'N

=== Singles ===
- 2008: "Fresh Dressed" (featuring Lil Wayne)

=== Appearances ===
- 2006: "Wanna Do" (from the Tony Touch mixtape Mic Destruction)
- 2006: "Gangstas & Murderers" (from the Hell Rell mixtape Streets Wanna Know)
- 2007: "Gladiators" (from The Diplomats album More Than Music Vol. 2)
- 2007: "Get Ya Grind On" (from The Diplomats mixtape Dipset All Day)
- 2007: "A Champ Is Like" (from the ByrdGang mixtape The New Season Vol. 2)
- 2007: "Sleep" (from the Lil Wayne mixtape I Am the Future Part 2)
- 2008: "Pussy MVP" (from the Lil Wayne mixtape Wayne's World 7: The Finale)
- 2008: "G'd Up" (from the DJ Khaled/DJ Lust mixtape The Pandemic)
