= Diplomatic Immunity 2 =

Studio album by The Diplomats
- Released: November 23, 2004
- Recorded: 2004
- Studios: Santana's World; Next Millenium; Sony Music Studios (New York, NY)
- Genre: Hip-hop
- Length: 1:10:45
- Labels: Diplomats; Koch
- Producers: Amadeus; Boola; Develop; Frank Visosky; Genghis; Hannon Lane; J. Fahre; Rephan; Skitzo; Stay Gettin'; The Heatmakerz; Treblemakers; Victor Babb

The Diplomats chronology
Diplomatic Immunity (2003)	Diplomatic Immunity 2 (2004)	Diplomatic Ties (2018)

Professional ratings
Review scores
Source	Rating
AllHipHop	3.5/5 stars
AllMusic	3.5/5 stars
Prefix	7/10
RapReviews	7/10
Tiny Mix Tapes	4.5/5 marks

Diplomatic Immunity 2 is the second studio album by American hip-hop collective The Diplomats. It was released on November 23, 2004, through Diplomat Records with distribution via Koch Records. Production was handled by The Heatmakerz, Stay Gettin', Skitzo, Amadeus, Boola, Develop, Frank Visosky, Genghis, Hannon Lane, J. Fahre, Rephan, Treblemakers and Victor Babb.

The album peaked at number 46 on the Billboard 200, number 8 on the Top R&B/Hip-Hop Albums, number 4 on the Top Rap Albums and number 3 on the Independent Albums charts in the United States. Its single "S.A.N.T.A.N.A." made it to number 86 on the Hot R&B/Hip-Hop Songs and number 64 on the Hot R&B/Hip-Hop Singles Sales charts.

== Track listing ==
No.	Title	Writer(s)	Producer(s)	Length
1.	"Stop-N-Go" (Cam'ron and J.R. Writer)	Cameron Giles; Rusty Brito; Bigram Zayas	Develop	6:13
2.	"S.A.N.T.A.N.A." (Juelz Santana)	LaRon James; S. Joyner; M. Brown	TrebleMakers	4:24
3.	"Take 'Em to Church" (Cam'ron and Juelz Santana featuring Un Kasa)	Giles; James	Amadeus	3:49
4.	"Get Use to This" (Juelz Santana and J.R. Writer)	James; Brito; Michael Miller; Lawrence Simpson	Stay Gettin'	3:57
5.	"Family Ties" (Cam'ron, 40 Cal. and Hell Rell)	Giles; Brito; Durell Mohammed; Dario Rodriguez	Skitzo	4:17
6.	"Wouldn't You Like to Be a Gangsta Too?" (Hell Rell)	Mohammed; V. Bertelsen	Genghis	4:34
7.	"Get from Round Me" (Cam'ron and Juelz Santana featuring Jha Jha)	Natoya Handy; Giles; James; Hannon T. Lane	Hannon Lane	4:19
8.	"Dutty Clap" (Jim Jones featuring S.A.S.)	Joseph Jones II; Sean Williams; Melvyn Williams; Alrad Lewis	Boola	3:30
9.	"I Wanna Be Your Lady" (Cam'ron and J.R. Writer featuring Nicole Wray)	Giles; Nicole Wray; Brito; Gregory Green; Sean Thomas; Rodriguez	The Heatmakerz; Skitzo (co.)	4:12
10.	"40 Cal" (40 Cal.)	Calvin Byrd; J. Fahre	J. Fahre	3:53
11.	"Melalin" (performed by Bugs)	Jamaul K. Aziz; Victor Babb; Frank Visosky	Victor Babb; Frank Visosky	3:59
12.	"So Free" (Cam'ron featuring S.A.S.)	Giles; M. Williams; S. Williams; T. Mudarikwa	Rephan	4:26
13.	"Dead Muthafuckas" (Cam'ron and Juelz Santana)	Giles; James; Miller; Simpson	Stay Gettin'	3:30
14.	"Push It" (Cam'ron, Jim Jones, Juelz Santana and J.R. Writer)	Giles; Jones II; James; Brito; Green; Thomas; Hurby Azor; Ray Davies	The Heatmakerz	3:32
15.	"Aayoo-iight" (Cam'ron and Juelz Santana)	Giles; James; Miller; Simpson	Stay Gettin'	3:52
16.	"Bigger Picture" (Cam'ron and Juelz Santana)	Giles; James; Green; Thomas	The Heatmakerz	4:02
17.	"Crunk Muzik" (Jim Jones, Cam'ron and Juelz Santana)	James; Green; Thomas	Blackout Muzik	4:16
Total length:				1:10:45

Sample credits

- Track 9 contains elements from "My Boo" written by Carlton Mahone Jr. and Rodney Terry.
- Track 14 contains a sample of the recording "Push It" as performed by Salt-N-Pepa. The original version contains a verse from Lil' Wayne instead of J.R. Writer.

== Personnel ==
- Cameron "Cam'Ron" Giles – vocals (tracks: 1, 3, 5, 7, 9, 12–17), executive producer
- LaRon "Juelz Santana" James – vocals (tracks: 2–4, 7, 13–17)
- Rusty "J.R. Writer" Brito – vocals (tracks: 1, 4, 5, 9, 14)
- Joseph "Jimmy" Jones – vocals (tracks: 8, 14, 17), executive producer
- Durell "Hell Rell" Mohammed – vocals (tracks: 5, 6)
- Sean Williams – vocals (tracks: 8, 12)
- Melvyn Williams – vocals (tracks: 8, 12)
- Antonio "Un Kasa" Wilder – vocals (track 3)
- Natoya "Jha-Jha" Handy – vocals (track 7)
- Nicole Wray – vocals (track 9)
- Calvin "40 Cal." Byrd – vocals (track 10)
- Jamaul "Bugs" Aziz – vocals (track 11)
- Bigram "DVLP" Zayas – producer (track 1)
- Shelby Joyner – producer (track 2)
- M. Brown – producer (track 2)
- Antwan "Amadeus" Thompson – producer (track 3)
- Michael Miller – producer (tracks: 4, 13, 15)
- Lawrence Simpson – producer (tracks: 4, 13, 15)
- Dario "Skitzo" Rodriguez – producer (track 5), co-producer (track 9)
- V. "Genghis" Bertelsen – producer (track 6)
- Hannon Lane – producer (track 7)
- Alrad "Boola" Lewis – producer (track 8)
- Gregory "Rsonist" Green – producer (tracks: 9, 14, 16, 17)
- Sean "Thrilla" Thomas – producer (tracks: 9, 14, 16, 17)
- J. Fahre – producer (track 10)
- Victor Babb – producer (track 11)
- Frank Visosky – producer (track 11)
- T. "Rephan" Mudarikwa – producer (track 12)
- Mike Thomas – recording (tracks: 1–3, 5–12, 14, 17), mixing (tracks: 1–12, 14, 15, 17)
- Saga Legin – recording (track 4)
- Eric "Ibo" Butler – recording (tracks: 13, 15, 16), mixing (tracks: 13, 16)
- George "DukeDaGod" Moore – A&R
- Jamel George – A&R

== Charts ==
=== Weekly charts ===
Chart (2004)	Peak position
US Billboard 200	46
US Top R&B/Hip-Hop Albums (Billboard)	8
US Top Rap Albums (Billboard)	4
US Independent Albums (Billboard)	3

=== Year-end charts ===
Chart (2005)	Position
US Top R&B/Hip-Hop Albums (Billboard)	78
