= Mooga =

Studio album by 40 Cal.
- Released: August 5, 2008
- Genre: Hip-hop
- Label: Gold Dust Media

40 Cal. chronology
Broken Safety 2 (2007)	Mooga (2008)

Professional ratings
Review scores
Source	Rating
HipHopDX	3/5
RapReviews	6/10

Mooga is the third album by the rapper 40 Cal., released in 2008. This is 40 Cal.'s first album with Gold Dust Media.

== Production ==
Some of the tracks were produced by unknown musicians found via Myspace.

== Critical reception ==
Exclaim! called the studio album full of "hard beats and venomous lyrics," writing that "there are various standout tracks on Mooga and chances are the listener may have a hard time choosing which one is the strongest."

== Track listing ==
1. 40 Intro (produced by M.G.I.)
2. Shooters On Deck (produced by Skyz Muzik)
3. On My Sh*t (featuring Sudaboss) (produced by Los)
4. Movie Shoot (produced by Chinky P)
5. Ten Stacks (produced by Chinky P)
6. Rewind That (produced by Mel Staxx)
7. Harlem Shuffle (featuring JR Writer)
8. Hustlas Anthem (featuring S.A.S.) (produced by Srada)
9. Googa Googa (produced by Konstantine Jones)
10. Cuarenta (produced by Lounge Lizards)
11. Spit How I Live It (produced by Doeboy)
12. New Beginning (featuring Duke Da God) (produced by A the Arketek)
13. Grown Man Bills
14. Heartbeat (produced by GQ Beats)
15. Heatin' Up (produced by Cookin' Soul)
16. Memories (produced by X.O.)
