= History in the Making (J.R. Writer album) =

Studio album by J.R. Writer
- Released: June 27, 2006
- Recorded: 2005–06
- Studio: Legindary Studios; Santana's World; Romeo Studios; Sony Music Studios (New York, NY)
- Genre: Hip hop
- Length: 1:12:48
- Label: Diplomats; New Era; Koch
- Producer: Antwan "Amadeus" Thompson; Dame Grease; Doe Boyz; Dutch Beetz; Flaco the Great; I.N.F.O.; J.U.S.T.I.C.E. League; Knoxville; Nova; Pro-V; The Narcotics; Treblemakers

J.R. Writer chronology
History in the Making (2006)	Politics and Bullshit (2008)

Professional ratings
Review scores
Source	Rating
AllMusic	3.5/5 stars
HipHopDX	3/5
PopMatters	5/10
RapReviews	6/10
Sputnikmusic	2/5

History in the Making is the debut solo studio album by American rapper J.R. Writer. It was released on June 27, 2006 through Diplomat/Koch Records. Recording sessions took place at Legindary Studios, at Santana's World, at Romeo Studios, and at Sony Music Studios in New York. Production was handled by Doe Boyz, Knoxville, Antwan "Amadeus" Thompson, Dame Grease, Dutch Beetz, Flaco The Great, I.N.F.O., J.U.S.T.I.C.E. League, Nova, Pro-V, The Narcotics and Treblemakers, with Cam'ron serving as executive producer. It features guest appearances from 40 Cal., Cam'ron, Fred Money, Hell Rell, Jim Jones, Nicole Wray, Paul Wall and S.A.S.

The album debuted at number 25 on the Billboard 200 and number two on both the Top R&B/Hip-Hop Albums and Top Rap Albums (held from the top spot by Pimp C's Pimpalation), selling an estimated 29,261 copies in its first week of release.

== Track listing ==
No.	Title	Writer(s)	Producer(s)	Length
1.	"To Be a Diplomat"	Rusty Brito; David Stokes; Stephen Hacker	Knoxville	3:28
2.	"My Life"	R. Brito; Bigram Zayas; Matthew Del Giorno	Doe Boyz	3:20
3.	"Take Notes"	R. Brito; John Christopher; Hacker	I.N.F.O.	3:19
4.	"Grill Em"	R. Brito; Zayas; Del Giorno	Doe Boyz	3:53
5.	"On the Block" (Interlude)	Christopher Roscoe; Levi Wanzer		2:34
6.	"Back with It"	R. Brito; Stokes; Hacker	Knoxville	3:09
7.	"Goonies" (featuring Jim Jones and Hell Rell)	R. Brito; Joseph Jones; Durell Mohammed; Stokes	Knoxville	3:53
8.	"He's Movin"	R. Brito; Antwan Thompson	Antwan "Amadeus" Thompson	4:02
9.	"Riot Pump"	R. Brito; Erik Ortiz; Kevin Crowe; C. Brown II; M. Rapp	J.U.S.T.I.C.E. League	4:58
10.	"Byrd Call" (featuring Cam'ron)	R. Brito; Cameron Giles; Zayas	Develop	4:01
11.	"Xtacy" (featuring Nicole Wray)	R. Brito; Nicole Wray	The Narcotics	3:54
12.	"Pay Homage" (featuring 40 Cal.)	R. Brito; Calvin Byrd	Flaco the Great	3:06
13.	"Zoolander"	R. Brito; Damon Blackman	Dame Grease	3:24
14.	"Put You On" (featuring Fred Money)	R. Brito; Fred Brito; Scott Novelli	Nova	4:16
15.	"High Music"	R. Brito; M. Brown; S. Joyner	Treblemakers	4:33
16.	"Why Try" (featuring S.A.S.)	R. Brito; Melvyn Williams; Sean Williams; Tyler Walton	Dutch Beetz	3:23
17.	"Stomp"	R. Brito; Zayas; Del Giorno	Doe Boyz	4:35
18.	"That's a Bet" (featuring Paul Wall)	R. Brito; Paul Slayton; Andrew Thielk; Hacker	Pro-V	4:30
19.	"The Heist"	R. Brito; Zayas; Del Giorno	Doe Boyz	4:30
Total length:				1:12:48

== Charts ==
Chart (2006)	Peak position
US Billboard 200	25
US Top R&B/Hip-Hop Albums (Billboard)	2
US Top Rap Albums (Billboard)	2
US Independent Albums (Billboard)	2
