= Diplomat Records =

American hip hop record label

Diplomat Records, LLC.
- Founded: 2001
- Founder: Cam'ron; Jim Jones
- Status: Active
- Distributor: The Island Def Jam Music Group (former)
- Genre: Hip hop; East Coast hip hop
- Country of origin: United States

Diplomat Records (also known as Diplomatic Man) is an American hip hop record label founded by record executives and rappers Cam'ron and Jim Jones.

== History ==
In the early 2000s, Dipset was very popular for having star rappers with radio hits like Juelz Santana and Cam'ron, as well as their association with Jay-Z, Damon Dash, and Kareem Burke's Roc-A-Fella Records, which was distributed under Def Jam Recordings. This resulted in four studio albums being released under the Dipset/Roc-A-Fella joint venture. In 2005, Dipset moved away from Roc-A-Fella after Jay-Z assumed presidency of Def Jam, which they took issue with. They had already signed to independent music powerhouse MNRK Music Group (formerly Koch/eOne) the year prior. Despite this, Juelz Santana's remained under contract with Def Jam for the time being until 2008 when Cam'ron sold his contract to the label in 2008. Santana only released one album under his Dipset/Def Jam deal in late 2005. Even though the Diplomats/Koch partnership seemed financially improved over the Roc-A-Fella deal, only co-founder Jim Jones became the most successful Dipset artist under that deal; one notice was his single, "We Fly High" (2006) scoring among the Billboard top ten and going platinum the following year. Between 2006 and 2009, Dipset was relatively quiet aside from Cam'ron and Jim Jones after alleged falling outs. However, in 2010, they reunited and have begun to associate themselves with rapper Vado. The recent release under Diplomat Records was in 2018 with the Empire-distributed Diplomatic Ties.

== Distribution ==
Diplomat Records doesn't have traditional distribution in the sense that each of its artists have deals with individual labels. In 2005, after signing with Koch (now MNRK Music) in 2004, then-president of A&R George "Duke Da God" Moore signed a deal to release the first official compilation through Dipset/Koch, Dipset: More Than Music, Vol. 1.

In 2005, when co-founder Cam'ron parted ways with Roc-A-Fella/Def Jam and signed with Warner Music Group's Alternative Distribution Alliance-distributed Asylum Records, he secured that his albums to be released under Diplomat Records, while also securing any future Diplomat group albums under Koch, with the exclusion of Juelz Santana, due to his obligations with Def Jam.

Former president Freekey Zekey also released his debut album on Diplomat with distribution coming from Asylum. In addition to the deal with Koch to release the More Than Music, Vol. 1 compilation album, co-founder Jim Jones released his first three albums under Koch in association with Diplomat Records. Juelz Santana also released his first two albums under Diplomat with distribution by Def Jam (one of which was his debut release under Def Jam's Roc-A-Fella), until his contract as a solo artist with Diplomat was sold to Def Jam by Cam'ron in 2008. In a 2008 interview, Diplomat member and signee 40 Cal. confirmed several labels that the individual members at the time (including J.R. Writer) were being distributed under Babygrande, though earlier reports listed him as being distributed, like many others on the Diplomat label, through Koch.

== Artists ==
- Cam'ron
- Jimmy Jones
- Juelz Santana
- The Diplomats

=== Former ===
Act	Years on the label	Releases under the label
Freekey Zekey	2002-2012	1
Hell Rell	2003-2008	1
J.R. Writer	2003-2008	1
S.A.S (Euro Gang)	2003-2008	1
40 Cal	2004-2008	3
Max B	2005-2007; 2010	

== Discography ==
Artist	Album	Details
Cam'ron	Come Home with Me (released under Roc-A-Fella Records)	Released: May 14, 2002; Chart position: #2 U.S.; RIAA certification: Platinum; Singles: "Oh Boy", "Hey Ma", "Day Dreaming"
The Diplomats	Diplomatic Immunity (released under Roc-A-Fella Records)	Released: March 25, 2003; Chart positions: #8 U.S.; RIAA certification: Gold; Singles: "Dipset Anthem", "I Really Mean It"
Juelz Santana	From Me to U (released under Roc-A-Fella Records)	Released: August 19, 2003; Chart position: #8 U.S.; RIAA certification: Singles: "Dipset (Santana's Town)"
Jim Jones	On My Way to Church (released under Koch Entertainment)	Released: August 24, 2004; Chart position: #18 U.S.; Singles: "Certified Gangstas", "Crunk Muzik'
The Diplomats	Diplomatic Immunity 2 (released under Koch Entertainment)	Released: November 23, 2004; Chart position: #46 U.S.; Singles: "S.A.N.T.A.N.A.", "Crunk Muzik", "Push It"
Cam'ron	Purple Haze (released under Roc-A-Fella Records)	Released: December 7, 2004; Chart position: #20 U.S.; RIAA certification: Gold; U.S. sales: 800,000; Singles: "Get Em Girl", "Girls", "Down and Out", "Hey Lady"
Various artists	DukeDaGod Presents: More Than Music, Vol. 1 (released under Koch Entertainment)	Released: July 12, 2005; Singles: "Get Down"
Jim Jones	Harlem: Diary of a Summer (released under Koch Entertainment)	Released: August 23, 2005; Chart position: #5 U.S.; Singles: "Baby Girl", "Summer Wit Miami", "What You Been Drankin' On"
Juelz Santana	What the Game's Been Missing! (released under Def Jam Recordings)	Released: November 22, 2005; Chart position: #9 U.S.; RIAA certification: Platinum; Singles: "Mic Check", "There It Go (The Whistle Song)", "Oh Yes", "Clockwork"
Cam'ron	Killa Season (released under Asylum Records)	Released: May 16, 2006; Chart position: #2 U.S.; RIAA certification: Gold; Singles: "Suck it or Not", "Wet Wipes"
J.R. Writer	History in the Making (released under Koch Entertainment)	Released: July 11, 2006; Chart position: #25 U.S.; Singles: "Grill 'Em", "Byrd Call"
Jim Jones	Hustler's P.O.M.E. (Product of My Environment) (released under Koch Entertainment)	Released: November 7, 2006; Chart position: #6 U.S.; Singles: "We Fly High", "Emotionless"
Various artists	DukeDaGod Presents: More Than Music, Vol. 2 (released under Koch Entertainment)	Released: May 8, 2007
Freekey Zekey	Book of Ezekiel (released under Asylum Records)	Released: July 24, 2007; Chart position: #154 U.S.; Singles: "Hater What You Lookin At", "Like This"
40 Cal.	Broken Safety 2 (released under Koch Entertainment)	Released: September 11, 2007; Chart position: #151 U.S.; Singles: "The Big Boys"
Hell Rell	For the Hell of It (released under Koch Entertainment)	Released: September 25, 2007; Chart position: #55 U.S.; Singles: "Show Off"
40 Cal.	The Yellow Tape (released under Koch Entertainment)	Released: April 11, 2008
Cam'ron	Crime Pays (released under Asylum Records)	Released: May 12, 2009; Chart position: #3 U.S.; Singles: "My Job", "Get It In Ohio", "Cookies-n-Apple Juice"
Harlem Fritz	Interstate Breesh Vol. 1 (released under Empire Records)	Released: May 6, 2010; Chart position: #138 U.S.
Cam'ron & Vado	Heat in Here Vol. 1 (released under Asylum Records)	Released: May 25, 2010
Cam'ron & Vado	Gunz n' Butta (released under eOne Music)	Released: April 19, 2011; Singles: "Speaking in Tungs", "Hey Mama", "We All Up in Here"
The Diplomats	Diplomatic Ties (released under Empire Distribution)	Released: November 21, 2018
