= Karen Civil =

American entrepreneur (born 1984)

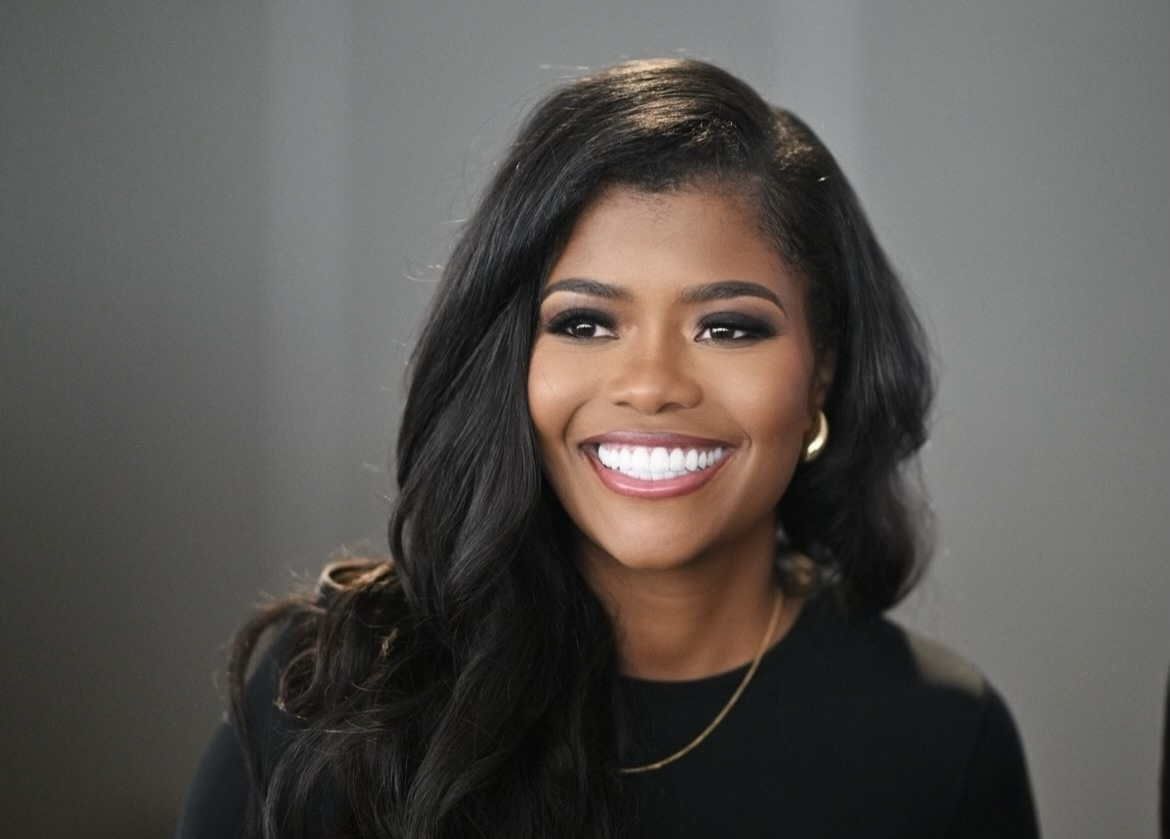
- Born: November 8, 1984 (age 41); New York City, U.S.
- Education: Union County College; Harvard Business School
- Occupations: Music Executive, marketing strategist, business women, producer, author
- Organization(s): Live Civil & Always Civil Enterprise
- Labels: Young Money Records; Republic Records
- Website: www.alwayscivil.com

Karen Civil (born November 8, 1984) also known as "KC", is a Haitian American music executive and digital media marketing strategist. She gained attention for creating and running Weezythanxyou.com, a website where the rapper Lil Wayne published letters to his fans while he was incarcerated at Rikers Island.

== Early life and education ==
Civil grew up in a Haitian-American family in Elizabeth, New Jersey. She attended Elizabeth High School, then Union County College in New Jersey. She received an online degree from Harvard Business School in 2019.

== Career ==
=== Early career ===
Civil began her media career in college, developing fan sites for actor J. D. Williams and The Backstreet Boys; the Backstreet Boys site came in third in a national competition and the Williams site put Civil in touch with the actor after Williams' lawyer sought her out. After graduating from high school, Civil entered community college but left to take an internship at radio station Hot 97 with DJ Funkmaster Flex in 2002, where she worked as a staff assistant; she also began working with The Diplomats to develop e-commerce for the group. Civil later moved to Asylum Records.

=== KarenCivil.com and Always Civil Enterprise ===
In 2008, Civil founded her own website karencivil.com and a marketing agency, Always Civil Enterprise, focused on digital strategy in the hip-hop industry. She was included in Billboard's Twitter 140. Her entrepreneurial spirit led her to start Always Civil Enterprise, with Lil Wayne as her first client. Her company subsequently went on to work with artists such as Mary J. Blige, Young Jeezy, Lee Daniels, Dave East, Ben Baller & James Harden.

=== Weezythanxyou.com and Young Money Records ===
In 2010 worked with rapper Lil Wayne to develop Weezythanxyou.com, so that the rapper could publish letters to his fans while he was incarcerated at Rikers Island. Since beginning her work with Lil Wayne, she has become involved with his company, Young Money, where she became the company's general manager and executive vice president in August 2022.

From 2011 to 2018, she worked with Beats by Dre as digital marketing manager.

Civil has become a public speaker, hosting events at universities, media outlets like BET, and women empowerment conferences and panels.

In 2014, Civil collaborated with Nipsey Hussle, Samiel Asghedom, and Steve-O the "Marathon Clothing" smartstore. She was very involved in planning the April 2019 memorial service for Nipsey Hussle and read the letter from former president Barack Obama that praised the rapper for his work in the community:

While most folks look at the Crenshaw neighborhood where he grew up and see only gangs, bullets, and despair, Nipsey saw potential.

In 2016, Civil became involved in music producing, co-producing a Wale song featuring Lil Wayne.

In addition to her role at Young Money, Karen Civil co-founded the Marathon Agency.

=== Book ===
In November 2015, Civil self-published a self-help book, Be You & Live Civil: Tools for Unlocking Your Potential & Living Your Purpose. Organized into four chapters called "Understanding Motivation", "Self Motivation", "Positive Attitude" and "Living Civil", Civil describes her approach to her career path.

=== Philanthropy ===
In 2015 Civil begin building a playground in Haiti, and for Christmas in 2015 she worked with Lil Wayne and Andre Berto to donate clothes, toys and books to 500 students at her Live Civil School.

In April 2017, Civil opened her Live Civil Computer Lab at the House Of Hope Orphanage in Haiti and donated 20 computers to the children. In August 2017, Civil worked with shoe company K-Swiss to produce a line of shoes. Civil had, as of December 2017, hosted an event called "Karen Civil Day" three times.

=== Other ===
Civil has spoken as a host for Hillary Clinton sponsored Democratic rallies. In 2016, BuzzFeed found tweets from 2009 by Civil that used anti-gay and anti-Jewish slurs. The Clinton campaign responded that they had no control over the speech of non-campaign staff.

Civil has been outspoken about women's rights in the workplace and in hip hop. Appearing on the Scoop B Radio podcast in 2017, Civil told Brandon Scoop B Robinson that she's glad that the MeToo movement was created because it shows that women are not going to take it.

== Recognition ==
Civil won a 2009 Black Web Award from Essence magazine. In 2010, the staff of MTV News thanked her for contributions she made to their urban journalism. In 2012, Civil was named to the Ebony Power 100 list. On September 15, 2015, Civil was a guest speaker at the White House "Champions of Change" event honoring young women and their contributions to their communities. She has been compared to Oprah Winfrey for her influence in the rap industry. Black Enterprise named Civil "social influencer of the year". In 2014, Civil was honored at both the 2014 BET Awards and the Salute 2014 Dinner. LA Weekly writer Mara Shalhoup wrote an article discussing Civil's various accomplishments, particularly her work with campaigning for Hillary Clinton in the 2016 U.S. Presidential election and her social media work. She was awarded the Key to the City from the city of Elizabeth, making her the youngest (and fourth) recipient of that key. In 2017, she was named “Social Influencer of the Year” by Black Enterprise. Civil featured on 2020 LA weekly cover and in 2023, Civil was recognized in Billboard magazine's HipHop/R&B Power players for 2023.

== Filmography ==
Civil served as an associate producer of the 2016 documentary film The Last Ride: A Philadelphia Story about Kyrell "Rell" Tyrel and bike culture.

In May 2018: "Good Looking Out" - Host (Complex Networks) - Karen Civil hosted the series "Good Looking Out" on Complex Networks for two seasons.
