= Freekey Zekey =

- Born: Ezekiel Jiles; October 13, 1975 (age 50)
- Origin: Manhattan, New York City, U.S.
- Genres: Hip hop
- Occupations: Rapper; record executive; businessman
- Years active: 1996–present
- Labels: MNRK; Big Cat; Diplomat; 730 Dips
- Member of: 730 Dips
- Formerly of: The Diplomats

Ezekiel Jiles (born October 13, 1975), known professionally as Freekey Zekey, is an American rapper best known as a founding member of now-defunct hip-hop group the Diplomats, which he helped form in Harlem in 1997 alongside his childhood friend Jim Jones and cousin Cam'ron. Freekey also serves as the owner/CEO of 730 Dips Records.

Aside from The Diplomats, he is also a member of fellow rapper Jim Jones' ByrdGang, and has made a habit of yelling his name in songs; it is his signature on tracks, whether he is featured or the solo artist.

== Career ==
Jiles, along with his cousin Cam'ron and their friend Jim Jones formed the hip-hop group the Diplomats in their hometown of Harlem, New York in 1997. Jiles adopted the stage name Freekey Zekey and the group began writing and performing songs together. In the early years of the group, Zekey served mostly as a hype man, yelling adlibs or his name during other members' songs and performances. Zekey was responsible for writing and performing almost all of the skits on Diplomat mixtapes and Cam'ron's albums, and did this until he was sentenced to 35–42 months in prison in February 2004. While in prison, Zekey began writing his own songs and honed his skills as a rapper. Just a few weeks after being released from prison in November 2006, Freekey signed a contract with Asylum Records to release his debut album, Book of Ezekiel. The album was released on July 24, 2007, and featured guest appearances from other members of The Diplomats, including Cam'ron, Jim Jones and Juelz Santana. The album peaked at #23 on the Billboard Top R&B/Hip Hop Albums chart. After The Diplomats effectively disbanded in 2007, Freekey went on to form his own label/group, the 730 Dips, and also joined Jim Jones' new group, ByrdGang.

== Personal life ==
=== 2003 shooting ===
On April 25, 2003, Jiles and his crew were involved in a minor car collision outside of a Manhattan nightclub, after another car collided with the back of the vehicle Jiles and his crew were inside. After stepping out of their vehicle, the men in the other car attempted to rob Jiles and his friends. Jiles was shot once in the abdomen and sustained minor injuries after the incident. In total, over 44 bullets were fired at Jiles and his crew during the altercation, and one member of Jiles’ entourage, his bodyguard Eric Mangrum, was killed. In December 2005, Chauncey Dillon was sentenced to 30 years in prison for both robbery and the murder of Mangrum.

== Legal issues ==
Jiles was sentenced to 35–42 months in prison on February 5, 2004, for running an ecstasy ring. Jiles served 33 months at the Durham Correctional Center in Durham, North Carolina before being released on November 20, 2006.

== Discography ==
=== Studio albums ===
Year	Title	Chart positions			Certifications and sales
Year	Title	U.S.	U.S. R&B	U.S. Rap	Certifications and sales
2007	Book of Ezekiel: First Studio Album; Released: July 24, 2007; Label: Diplomat Records/Asylum Records	154	23	8	US Sales: N/A

=== Mixtapes ===
- 2008: Blame It on the Henny
- 2008: Henny & a Cigarette
- 2010: Gangsta Ambition

=== Singles ===
==== As lead artist ====
Year	Title	Chart positions			Album
Year	Title	U.S. Hot 100	U.S. R&B	U.S. Rap	Album
2007	"Hater What You Lookin' At"	—	—	—	Book of Ezekiel
2007	"Like This"	—	—	—	Book of Ezekiel
2007	"Livin' It Up"	—	—	—	Book of Ezekiel
2009	"I'm Poppin'"	—	—	—	—

==== As featured artist ====
Year	Title	Chart positions			Album
Year	Title	U.S. Hot 100	U.S. R&B	U.S. Rap	Album
2004	"Hey Lady" (Cam'ron featuring Freekey Zekey)	—	—	—	Purple Haze

=== Guest appearances ===
List of non-single guest appearances, with other performing artists, showing year released and album name
Title	Year	Other artist(s)	Album
"Disgusting"	2012	Young Cutta, Tito Green	Where's The Fire
