= 40 Cal. =

American rapper (born 1979)

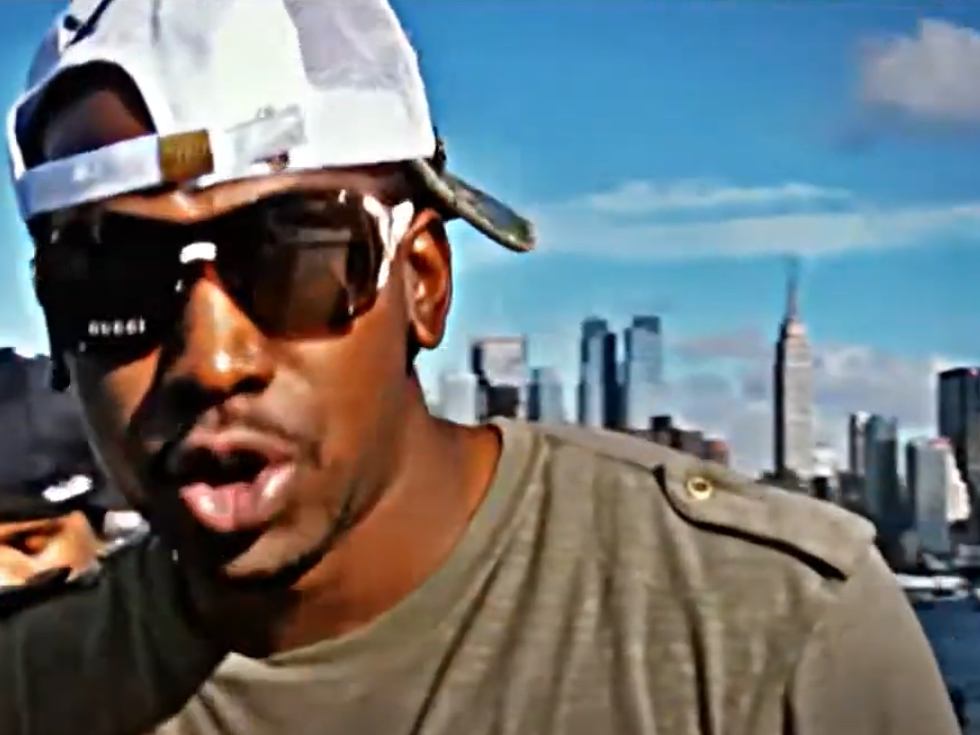
- Byrd in New York City in 2021

Background information
- Born: Calvin Robert Byrd; December 17, 1979 (age 46)
- Origin: Manhattan, New York City, U.S.
- Genres: Hip hop
- Occupation: Rapper
- Years active: 2004–present
- Labels: Diplomat (2004–present); Koch (2004-2007); Babygrande (2007–present); Cleopatra (2006–present); Interscope
- Formerly of: The Diplomats

Calvin Alan Byrd (born December 17, 1979), professionally known by his stage name 40 Cal., is an American rapper. He was a member of now-defunct American hip-hop group The Diplomats.

Byrd made his first appearance on the self-titled theme song, "40 Cal", for the Dipset album Diplomatic Immunity 2. He took part in MTV2's Fight Klub MC battles.

== Discography ==
=== Studio albums ===
List of albums, with selected chart positions
Title	Album details	Peak chart positions		
Title	Album details	US	US R&B	US Rap
Broken Safety	Released: August 8, 2006; Label: Cleopatra Records, Diplomat Records	—	81	—
Broken Safety 2	Released: September 11, 2007; Label: Koch Records, Diplomat Records	151	27	12
Mooga	Released: August 5, 2008; Label: Gold Dust Media	—	—	—

=== Street LPs ===
- 2006: Trigger Happy
- 2007: Trigger Happy 2
- 2008: The Yellow Tape
- 2008: Leader of the New School

=== EPs ===
- 2008: Harlem Shuffle EP
- 2011: Trigga Happy 3 a.k.a. Trigganometry (EP)

=== Mixtapes ===
- 2006: 40 to Life
- 2007: 40 to Life Part 2
- 2008: Dip Masters Collection
- 2009: Da Carter After Nino, Like New Jack
- 2011: God's Gift to an iPod
- 2011: Rap Sheet
- 2012: Watch The Chrome
- 2012: Target Practice
- 2012: 2nd Hand Smoke

=== Guest appearances ===
Friday the 13 contributing artist 40 cal, A-lox (track 2)

List of non-single guest appearances, with other performing artists, showing year released and album name
Title	Year	Other artist(s)	Album	
"Family Ties"	2004	Cam'ron, Hell Rell	Diplomatic Immunity 2	
"40 Cal."	2004	S.A.S.	Diplomatic Immunity 2	
"I'm in Love With a Thug"	2005	Jim Jones	Harlem: Diary of a Summer	
"Tupac Joint"	2005	Jim Jones, Hussein Fatal	Harlem: Diary of a Summer	
"Triple Up"	2006	Cam'ron	Killa Season	
"Gutta"	2006	J.R. Writer	Writers Block 3	
"Code Red"	2006	Jim Jones, Max B, Stack Bundles	The Seven Day Theory	
"Too High"	2006	Jim Jones, Max B	A Dipset X-Mas	
"The Pit"	2006	J.R. Writer, Hell Rell	Fresh Prince of Harlem Vol. 1	
"Grand Finale"	2006	Hell Rell, J.R. Writer	Streets Wanna Know	
"Getting Money"	2006	J.R. Writer	Dipset: The Movement Moves On	
"Pay Homage"	2006	J.R. Writer	History in the Making	
"Don't Do It"	2007	JR Writer, Hell Rell	Block Work	
"Business Before Plessure"	2007	iLLmacuLate, OnlyOne	The Rain Check: Mixtape	
"3 Shots"	2007	Hell Rell, JR Writer	Eat With Me or Eat a Box of Bullets	
"Telling Lies"	2007	Hell Rell	New Gun In Town	
"Over Drive"	2007	J.R. Writer	Writer's Block 4	
"Welcome to the Set"	2008	S.A.S.	Where Is S.A.S.?	
"My kind of Gangsta"	2008	2008	Milli Millz, Toolez, Prince & HDesign	Eurostreetz Global Tactics Vol. 1
"Swagga Talk"	2008	2008	Cam'ron, Hell Rell	Public Enemy #1
"Troublemakers"	Cam'ron, Penz	2008		Public Enemy #1
"Woo Hoo"	2009	Cam'ron, Byrd Lady	Crime Pays	
"#1 Movement"	2009	Hell Rell	Get In Line or Get Lined Up	
"Young Black & Strapped"	2009	Hell Rell	Get In Line or Get Lined Up	
"Streets Is Gettin' Hot"	2009	Tek, Ali Vegas, Beenie Man, Big Pooh, Chirie Vegas, Doo Wop, Icadon, Mic Geronimo, Stat Quo	I Did It My Way	
"Not at All"	2012	J.R. Writer	ET: Extra-Terrestrial Musik	
"Money dans le jean"	2013	Dan-D X Ronnie Ron	Slowmotion	
