= Hell Rell =

American rapper (born 1979)

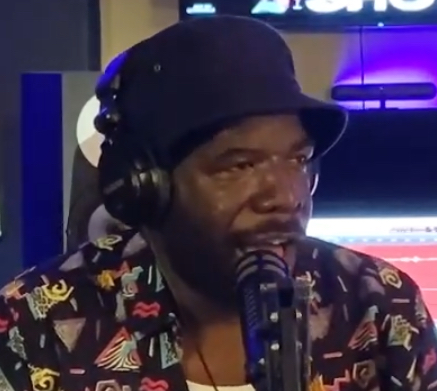
- Mohammad in 2020

Background information
- Also known as: Ruga Rell
- Born: Durrell Mohammad; May 3, 1979 (age 47); New York City, U.S.
- Genres: Hip-hop
- Occupation: Rapper
- Instrument: Vocals
- Years active: 1999–present
- Labels: Top Gunnas (current); Diplomat Records; Koch; Interscope; Real Talk (former); Babygrande; Sony Music

Durrell Mohammad (born May 3, 1979), better known by his stage name Hell Rell, is an American rapper.

== Career ==
Around August 2001, he would make his first appearance on Freestyle Friday for 106 & Park, going up against Posta Boy in a rap battle. From 2004-2006, he would make features on Diplomats' records. In 2007, he signed with Koch Records and began working on his debut album, For the Hell of It. The album reached No. 5 on both the Billboard Top Independent Albums and Top Rap Albums chart, and No. 10 on the Top R&B/Hip-Hop Albums.

== Discography ==
=== Albums ===
- 2007: For the Hell of It
- 2008: Black Mask, Black Gloves
- 2009: Get in Line or Get Lined Up
- 2009: Hard as Hell
- 2019: Forgive but Never Forget

=== Other albums ===
- 2007: Eat with Me or Eat a Box of Bullets
- 2009: Live from Hell
- 2009: Hell Up in the Bronx

=== Compilation albums ===
- 2009: Hell Rell Hosts: Straight Outta Harlem (The Ultimate Uptown Collection)

=== Collaboration mixtapes ===
- 2007: Double Trouble (with J.R. Writer)
- 2007: Year of the Gun (with 40 Cal.)
- 2011: Gun Clap (with J.R. Writer)
- 2011: Guilty by Association (with J. Stalin & Lord Geez)
- 2012: Bronx Tales (with Yung JB)

=== Solo mixtapes ===
- 2004: Fire & Ice (Mixed by DJ Sickamore)
- 2005: Streets Wanna Know
- 2006: New Gun in Town
- 2008: Top Gunna: The Ruga Edition
- 2009: The Extermination: Return to the Grind
- 2010: Bullpen Therapy
- 2010: You need People like Me: The Return of the Black Mask
- 2010: Black Masks Black Gloves: Ruga Edition
- 2011: Million Dollar Dreams Federal Nightmares
- 2011: Us never Them - The Mixtape
- 2011: The Black Cloud
- 2012: Not Guilty
- 2013: Streets Wanna Know 2: Valentines Day Massacre
- 2013: The Meyer Lansky Project
- 2014: Walking Brick
- 2015: O.N.Y.G. (Mixed by DJ Sam Hoody)
- 2017: The Scale

=== Guest appearances ===
List of non-single guest appearances, with other performing artists, showing year released and album name
Title	Year	Other performer(s)	Album
"Wouldn't You Like To Be A Gangsta Too?"	2004	The Diplomats	Diplomatic Immunity 2
"Back In the Building"	2005	Heatmakerz	The Crack Mixtape Vol.1
"Line Up (Pt. II)"	2005	Jay Bezel, S.A.S., Un Kasa	The Philadelphia Beast
"Penetentiary Chances"	2005	Jim Jones	Harlem: Diary of a Summer
"Get 'Em Daddy" (remix)	2005	Cam'ron, Jim Jones, J.R. Writer	Killa Season
"He Tried To Play Me"	2005	Cam'Ron	Killa Season
"Pour Wax"	2006	Jim Jones	Hustler's P.O.M.E. (Product of My Environment)
"Day Dream"	2006	Jim Jones, Max B	The Seven Day Theory
"The Movement Is Moving"	2006	J.R. Writer	Writers Block 3
"Get Em Daddy"	2006	J.R. Writer, Cam'ron, Jim Jones	Fresh Prince of Harlem Vol. 1
"It's Ugly"	2006	Heatmakerz, Cam'ron	Crack On Wax
"Goonies"	2006	JR Writer, Jim Jones	History in the Making
"All I Know"	2007	Green Lantern, Akon	Alive on Arrival
"Shoot Em Up"	2007	Freekey Zekey, J.R. Writer	Book of Ezekiel
"Switch It Up"	2007	J.R. Writer	Writer's Block 4
"In My Zone"	2007	J.R. Writer	Writer's Block 4
"Hostile Takeova"	2007	40 Cal.	Broken Safety 2
"Stuntin" (remix)	2007	Cormega	Who Am I?
"Block Huggas"	2007	40 Cal, A-Mafia, JR Writer	Trigger Happy
"Don't Do It"	2007	JR Writer, 40 Cal	Block Work
"Heartbeat"	2008	ByrdGang, Jim Jones, Noe	M.O.B.: The Album
"Harder Than Ever"	2008	JR Writer	My Past Is Your Future
"Direct Connect"	2008	Sky Balla	Tycoon Status
"D-Block/Dipset"	2008	Sheek Louch, Jadakiss, Jim Jones, Styles P	Silverback Gorilla
"3 Gunz" (Leo G Mix)	2008	40 Cal, JR Writer	Leader Of The New School
"Extermination"	2009	J.R. Writer	Cinecrack
"What Up"	2009	AZ, Sheek Louch	Legendary and Life on D-Block
"1-800-RAT-ON-A-G"	2009	B.A.M. & Ric Rude,	The New Golden Era
"I've Seen"	2010	DMX, J.R. Writer	Mixtape
"This Is That"	2010	DMX	Mixtape
"Don't Say Shhh"	2010	Monsta, Ganxsta Rid	Pacific Coast Highway
"We Don't Count Money"	2012	Lil Reese	Don't Like
"Body Bag"	2012	A-Mafia	Under The Scope
"Now They Don't Know Me"	2012	Philthy Rich, Stevie Joe	Not Enough Real N*ggas Left
"Back to Back"	2014	DJ Kay Slay, J.R. Writer, Oun-P, William Young, Lucky Don	The Rise of a City
"C.F.W.U. (Cantfuckwithus)"	2014	Cam'ron, Jim Jones	1st of the Month Vol. 2
"Back On Our Bullshit"	2014	Cam'ron	1st of the Month Vol. 3
"Wonderland"	2014	Cam'ron	1st of the Month Vol. 5
"Naming Names"	2015	Taylor Karras	Conspiracy
"Street Stories"	2016	DJ Kay Slay, Termanology, Oun-P	The Rap Attack
"Fake Hittas"	2021	Money Boy	

- Mixtape album by Hell Rell and Glaze
