= The Diplomats =

American hip hop group

- From left to right: Cam'ron, Juelz Santana, Freekey Zekey, and Jim Jones

Background information
- Also known as: Dipset
- Origin: Manhattan, New York City, U.S.
- Genre: Hip-hop
- Works: The Diplomats discography
- Years active: 1997–2007 • 2010–2015 • 2017–2025
- Labels: Diplomat; Koch; Island Def Jam; Roc-A-Fella
- Spinoff of: The Heatmakerz
- Past members: Cam'ron; Freekey Zekey; Jim Jones; Juelz Santana; 40 Cal.; J.R. Writer; Hell Rell

The Diplomats (also known as Dipset) were an American hip hop collective formed in the summer of 1997 by childhood friends Cam'ron and Jimmy Jones in Harlem, New York City. The group was originally composed of Cam'ron, Jim Jones and Freekey Zekey, all of whom grew up together in Harlem. In 1999, fellow Harlem-based rapper Juelz Santana joined the group.

In 2001, following Cam'ron's signing, the group secured a recording contract with Roc-A-Fella Records. It subsequently began recording its debut album, Diplomatic Immunity, and released it on the aforementioned labels in March 2003. Following tensions and controversy between Cam'ron and Jay-Z, the group subsequently severed ties with Roc-A-Fella and signed with indie record label Koch Records. The group released its second album Diplomatic Immunity 2, in November 2004 on Koch. After a hiatus due to artistic differences, in 2010 the original members began recording music together again and announced a reunion album. In February 2011, it was announced that the group had signed with Interscope Records. However, in May 2013, Freekey Zekey revealed it no longer recorded for Interscope.

In late 2018, they released their first official album in 14 years, Diplomatic Ties, under Empire Distribution. In 2021, they participated in a Verzuz-related battle with The Lox.

In January 2025, a dispute between founding members Cam'ron and Jim Jones erupted, signaling another end to the Diplomats after nearly 28 years.

== History ==
=== Career beginnings and success (2000–2006) ===
The first commercial appearance of the group was on Cam'ron's 2000 album S.D.E., released on Epic Records. Cam'ron eventually demanded a release from Epic, and signed with Roc-A-Fella Records, then owned by his childhood friend Damon Dash. Cam'ron released his third album, Come Home with Me through Roc-A-Fella. The album featured numerous guest appearances from Juelz Santana and Jim Jones. The lead singles were platinum hits "Oh Boy" and "Hey Ma", which both featured Santana. The album served as both an introduction to The Diplomats and a stepping stone for the rest of the group to be signed to Roc-A-Fella.

The Diplomats followed Cam'ron's solo album shortly after with their debut album Diplomatic Immunity released in 2003, which featured a remix of "Hey Ma", as well as the lead single, "Dipset Anthem", produced by Heatmakerz which peaked at #64 on the Billboard Hot R&B/Hip-Hop Songs chart. The double-disc album was a success and quickly became certified gold by RIAA less than two months after its release. By the time of the release of their 2004 followup, Diplomatic Immunity 2, additional members Hell Rell, 40 Cal., and J. R. Writer had joined the group. Before long the Dipset empire was growing adding affiliates such as: Jay Bezel, Un Kasa, the late Stack Bundles, Max B, comedian Katt Williams, and female first lady, Jha Jha. In 2006, Jim Jones created his own person skating team, called Dipskate.

=== Artistic disagreements (2007–2009) ===
In mid-2007, rumors began to circulate that the Diplomats had many rifts and disagreements with each other, specifically between Cam'ron and Jim Jones. When Jones and Juelz Santana appeared on stage at a concert with 50 Cent — with whom Cam'ron was engaged in a feud at the time — it seemed as if the group had split. However, in a later interview, 40 Cal. hinted that while the dynamic of the group is likely beyond repair, there may be further collaboration. Juelz Santana also spoke on a future collaboration, but stated that at the time, Cam'ron seemed to be the only obstacle, while also stating that though his contract was sold to Def Jam, he had no hard feelings towards his former boss.

In a September 2008 interview, Hell Rell stated that he no longer has a contractual obligation to Cam'ron or Jim Jones. Within the interview, Juelz also stated that he is still on speaking terms with the members of the group, and didn't feel that they were holding him back, but he did feel the "mainstream" wasn't crediting him as notably as he had hoped. In a later interview, he stated that he felt the other members of the group were not as focused as him, while also stating there was selfishness within the group. He also stated he wanted to focus more on his solo career.

Following this, almost all former members of The Diplomats formed their own groups. In 2007, 40 Cal. started "Skeme Team", while Freekey Zekey formed the "730 Dips", and started a record label of the same name, "730 Dips Records", while also joining fellow Diplomats' member Jim Jones' new group, "ByrdGang".

In 2008, Juelz Santana started the "Skull Gang" which, when his contract was sold to Def Jam, also secured a deal that included the solo members. In 2009, Cam'ron started a new group called the U.N and Dipset West. In 2008, Hell Rell started Top Gunnas and J.R started Thundabyrdz.

In 2009, Cam'ron created the U.N. (Us Now), featuring himself and Vado. The group released one album, 2011's, Gunz n' Butta'.

=== Diplomats reunion & demise (2010–2015) ===
In April 2010, Cam'ron and Jim Jones officially announced the end of their feud. In June 2010, the Dipset reunion began with a teaser titled "Under Construction" and a street single, "Salute", produced by AraabMuzik being released. The song features Jim Jones, Cam'ron and Juelz Santana. The remix features new Diplomat artist Vado with a verse added. In October 2010, after an interview at The Source Magazine Headquarters where Freekey Zekey insinuated that a Dipset deal with Interscope Records was possible by pointing to a magazine cover with Dr. Dre's picture (in addition to the revelation that the group has actually recorded with Dre), Freekey confirmed that the group would be signing a deal with the label: "The papers are not actually signed right now, but you could basically say it's going down," said Freekey in an interview with TheQuestion.com, when asked about the possibility of a deal with Interscope.

In February 2011, it was reported The Diplomats had signed a record deal with Interscope Records. They also revealed plans for a reunion album to be released under the label.

In January 2013, Juelz Santana indicated that the album was still coming. He would later also promise a new Diplomats single to be released "soon". The group hosted a reunion concert in New York on March 25, 2013, to celebrate the 10-year anniversary of Diplomatic Immunity's release. Waka Flocka Flame would also perform at the concert. In May 2013, Freekey Zekey revealed that the group was no longer signed to Interscope Records.

On March 18, 2014, J.R. Writer began his prison sentence at Ulster Correctional Facility, in New York. On May 15, 2014, the original members of The Diplomats reunited for a brand new single produced by Just Blaze and entitled "Dipshits". On May 30, 2014, J.R. Writer released a recorded phone call from the Ulster Correctional Facility, in which he is freestyling and dissing his former label-head Cam'ron, as well as Jim Jones and Dame Dash. This was theoretically in response to Cam'ron's "Dipshits" video, which had additional vocals from Dame Dash and DJ A-Trak.

On January 1, 2015, well known DJ Funkmaster Flex announced via his Instagram that he had spoken to fellow Diplomat members Cam'ron, Jim Jones & Juelz Santana about an upcoming Diplomat's mixtape which included fellow member Freekey Zeekey. He also confirmed that he would be hosting the mixtape along with DJ's/Producers DJ Khaled, Swizz Beatz & DJ Mustard. The following week, Cam'ron, Jim Jones, Juelz Santana, and Freekey Zekey released a new track called "Have My Money". The track was released on Funkmaster Flex's show, on Hot 97.

=== Second reunion and disputes (2017–2025) ===
On November 15, 2017, Jim Jones announced on his Instagram that a new Diplomats single was to be released that night, titled "Once Upon a Time", and featuring him and Cam'ron. On November 22, 2017, The Diplomats revealed on MTV's TRL that they would be releasing an EP along with a documentary in the near future. Later that night, the group performed a one night only reunion concert at the Manhattan Center, where they were joined by fellow New York group ASAP Mob.

In March 2018, Juelz Santana surrendered himself to police after fleeing a Newark Liberty International Airport when a loaded .38-caliber handgun was found in his bag. Cam'ron said on his Instagram that he, Jim Jones and Freekey Zeekey would continue touring while Santana was incarcerated, but also claimed Santana would be "home soon".

During the summer of 2018, The Diplomats went on a U.S. national tour entitled Dipset Forever. On October 8, 2018, Jim Jones confirmed Dipset would be releasing a new album titled Diplomatic Ties on November 22, 2018 (Thanksgiving Day) followed by a performance at the Apollo Theatre in Harlem, NY the next day.

On August 2, 2021, the original lineup of the Diplomats were participant in a rap battle with The Lox (consisting of all three members Jadakiss, Styles P and Sheek Louch) via Verzuz.

Between January 12 and 15, 2025, disputes between Jim Jones and Cam'ron recanted after the latter invited former rival 50 Cent on his podcast to discuss exchanges between the Diplomats and G-Unit in the height of their feud which began in 2007. Jones disapproved of Cam'ron's actions and criticized both rappers. These responses also disparaged the group after nearly 28 years of activity.

== Controversies ==
The Diplomats were known for their numerous controversial lyrics about the September 11 attacks.

== Discography ==
Studio albums

- Diplomatic Immunity (2003)
- Diplomatic Immunity 2 (2004)
- Diplomatic Ties (2018)

== Filmography ==
- The Original Harlem Diplomats
- Sippin' On Sizzurp Bonus DVD
- A Day in the Fast Life
- Killa Season
- Eye of the Eagle
- State Property 2
- Paid in Full
