= DukeDaGod =

American rapper and record producer

- Born: George Moore; March 16, 1977 (age 49); Harlem, New York City, U.S.
- Genres: Rap, Record producer
- Occupations: Rapper
- Label: Diplomat Records

DukeDaGod (born March 16, 1977) is an American rapper and record producer. He is a member of The Diplomats and the VP of A&R for Diplomat Records. He was born George Moore in Harlem, but is better known by his stage name. He released his first album More Than Music, Vol. 1 in summer of 2005 under Diplomats/Koch Records.

== Musical career ==
Moore got involved with the music industry when he helped form the hip-hop group Children of the Corn, composed of his childhood friends Big L, Cam'ron, Mase, Herb McGruff, Bloodshed, and Six Figga Digga. Moore served as the road manager until Bloodshed's untimely death and the group disbanded. Moore had a chance to be an A&R at Roc-A-Fella Records through Dame Dash when the label first started, but Moore declined the position and later hooked up with Cam'ron once again, where he became Diplomat Records' A&R, overseeing all of the Diplomat artists' recording projects.

Moore's greatest success was with the album Dipset: The Movement Moves On, which reached #53 on the Billboard 200 in 2006.

Moore has announced that his new album D.I.P. Agenda distributed through SMG Recordings will be hitting stores November 2010, with features from Jadakiss, Hell Rell, Cam'ron, J.R. Writer and 40 cal . Any other information has not been reported

=== Studio albums ===
Year	Title
2005	Dipset:DUKEDAGOD PRESENTS MORE THAN MUSIC Released June 2005: Label Koch Records
2006	Dipset: The Movement Moves On: Released: April 11, 2006; Label: Asylum Records
2007	Dipset: The Eye Of The Eagle: Released: November 6, 2007; Label: Rbc Records
2008	Harlem Classics: Released: April 8, 2008
2010	D.I.P Agenda: Released: November 22, 2010; Label: SMC Records

=== Compilations ===
Year	Title	Notes
2011	Bridge Wars: Released: Dec 1, 2011; Label: Queensbridge Records; Producer for F.E.R.N	
2010	Streets Anthem, Vol. 2: Released: May 5, 2010; Label: PARADOX RECORDS LLC; Intro for album	
