= J.R. Writer =

Dominican-American rapper

- Also known as: Rusty Brito
- Born: Juan Rusty Brito; May 28, 1985 (age 41)
- Origin: Harlem, New York City, U.S.
- Genres: East coast hip hop, hip hop, freestyle rap
- Occupations: Rapper, songwriter
- Years active: 2003–present
- Labels: Diplomat; Koch; Asylum; Atlantic; Babygrande
- Formerly of: The Diplomats

Juan Rusty Brito (born May 28, 1985) better known by his stage name J.R. Writer, is an American rapper and freestyle champion. He came to prominence in the early 2000s after becoming affiliated with the hip hop group The Diplomats and guest appeared on Juelz Santana's 2003 album From Me to U.

JR signed a joint venture deal with Diplomat and Koch Records to release his debut studio album History in the Making which was released in 2006, which made the top 30 on the Billboard 200.

== Early life ==
Brito was born in the Harlem section of Manhattan in New York City to parents of Dominican descent, alongside his brother Fred Brito, also known as rapper Fred Money.

== Career ==
At some point in his teens, J.R. started rapping in the streets of New York, battling with other MCs which gained him prominence in Harlem's underground rap scene which led him to appear on local cable access television programs and joining every open mic competition he could. He became a well-known lyricist and freestyle champion throughout Harlem and has listed Big Pun, Big L, 2Pac, as his influences, and later on in life, Cam'ron.

At one of his rap battles, het met Cam'ron and Juelz Santana around the time Cam signed to Roc-A-Fella and Juelz was up-and-coming. It was then he went to make his commercial debut on Juelz's studio album From Me to U, appearing on the track "Squalie". This led him to becoming a member of The Diplomats and signing a joint venture deal with Diplomat and Koch Records to release his debut album.

He has released one studio album and fifteen mixtapes since 2003, having collaborated with Cassidy, Fred Money, Lloyd Banks, Tito Green, Ransom, Drag-On, Sen City, Paul Wall, T.W.O., Duke Da God, A-Money, Vado, Jae Millz, AraabMuzik and more. He released his debut album History in the Making in 2006, through Koch and Diplomat Records. The album peaked at number 25 on the Billboard 200 and at number 2 on both the Top R&B/Hip-Hop Albums and Top Rap Albums, held from the top spot of both charts by Pimp C's Pimpalation.

On February 23, 2014, Writer released a 13-track mixtape titled The Return of Greatness, which includes guest appearances from Styles P, Fat Trel, Vado, Hell Rell and Fred Money as well as production from Track Officialz, SpecX2, Butter Beats DBK, Razah, Myes William, Stat Five Ave, Stoopid On The Beat and Automatik Beatz.

On March 18, 2014, Writer began a prison sentence at Ulster Correctional Facility in New York State.

On January 26, 2019, Writer released a diss track aimed at Tory Lanez called "Head Shot". One month later, he released another titled "Run Tory Run".

== Discography ==
=== Studio albums ===
List of studio albums with album details and selected chart positions
Album	Peak chart positions		
Album	US	US R&B	US Rap
History in the Making: Released: July 11, 2006; Label: Diplomat, Koch	25	2	2

=== Mixtapes ===
List of mixtapes and album details
Title	Album details
Writer's Block	Released: 2004; Label: Self-released; Format: Download
Writer's Block 2	Released: 2005; Label: Self-released; Format: Download
Writer's Block 3	Released: 2006; Label: Self-released; Format: Download
Writer's Block 4	Released: February 13, 2007; Label: Diplomat, Asylum, New Era, Writer's Block, Duke; Format: Download
Writer's Block 5	Released: November 20, 2007; Label: Babygrande, Writer's Block; Format: Download
Cinecrack 1.5	Released: March 31, 2009; Label: Self-released; Format: Download
Still Standing	Released: April 29, 2010; Label: Self-released; Format: Download
Still Standing 2: Kill 'Em Dead	Released: May 24, 2011; Label: Self-released; Format: Download
Still Standing 3	Released: December 7, 2011; Label: Self-released; Format: Download
E.T.: Extra-Terrestrial Musik	Released: October 4, 2012; Label: Self-released; Format: Download
The Return Of Greatness	Released: February 23, 2014; Label: Self-released; Format: Download
Writer's Block 6: Extended Clip	Released: March 18, 2014; Label: Self-released; Format: Download
Meet Zeus	Released: September 11, 2016; Label: Self-released; Format: Download
#IREALLYRAP	Released: November 30, 2017; Label: Self-released; Format: Download
The Upstage (with Hell Rell and 40 Cal)	Released: November 22, 2018; Label: Self-released; Format: Download

=== Guest appearances ===
List of non-single guest appearances, with other performing artists, showing year released and album name
Title	Year	Artist(s)	Album
"Crazy"	2007	DJ Absolut, Papoose, Styles P, Hell Rell, Rick Ross	A Case of Supply & Demand
"Back to Back"	2014	DJ Kay Slay, Hell Rell, Oun P, William Young, L	The Rise of a City
"MMM (Remix)"	2015	Cassidy, Fred Money, Vado, Red Café, Papoose, Maino, Uncle Murda, Fat Trel, Fred the Godson, Chubby Jag, Drag-On, Dave East, Compton Menace	—N/a
