= Dame Grease production discography =

The following list is a discography of production by Dame Grease, an American hip hop record producer from Harlem, New York. It includes a list of songs produced, co-produced and remixed by year, artist, album and title.

== 1997 ==
=== Mase - Harlem World ===
- "Niggaz Wanna Act"

== 1998 ==
=== The LOX - Money, Power & Respect ===
- "If You Think I'm Jiggy"
- "Let's Start Rap Over"
- "Not to Be Fucked With"
- "Everybody Wanna Rat"
- "We'll Always Love Big Poppa"

=== DMX - It's Dark and Hell Is Hot ===
- "Fuckin' wit' D"
- "Look Thru My Eyes"
- "Get at Me Dog"
- "Let Me Fly"
- "Damien"
- "Stop Being Greedy"
- "ATF"
- "For My Dogs"
- "I Can Feel It"
- "The Convo"
- "Niggas Done Started Somethin'"

=== Noreaga - N.O.R.E. ===
- "Body in the Trunk" (featuring Nas)

=== Fat Joe - Don Cartagena ===
- "Triplets" (featuring Big Pun and Prospect)

=== Various Artists - Blade (soundtrack) ===
- "Things Ain't the Same" (performed by Kasino)

=== Various artists - Belly (soundtrack) ===
- "Two Sides" (performed by Hotti Totti)

=== Various artists - Def Jam's Rush Hour (Soundtrack) ===
- "And You Don't Stop" (performed by Wu-Tang Clan)

=== DMX - Flesh of My Flesh, Blood of My Blood ===
- "Dogs for Life"

=== Cam'ron - Confessions of Fire ===
Leftover

- "Pull It" (featuring DMX)

== 1999 ==
=== Harlem World - The Movement ===
- "Meaning of Family" (featuring The Teamsters)
- "Pointing Fingers"

=== The Madd Rapper - Tell 'Em Why U Madd ===
- "Roll with the Cat"

=== Nas - I Am... ===
- "Ghetto Prisoners"

=== Slick Rick - The Art of Storytelling ===
- "Adults Only"

=== Tricky - Juxtapose ===
- "For Real"
- "Bom Bom Diggy"
- "I Like the Girls"
- "Hot Like a Sauna"

=== Made Men - Classic: Limited Edition ===
- "No Matter What"

=== Nas - Nastradamus ===
- "Some of Us Have Angels"
- "Family"
- "God Loves Us"
- "Quiet Niggas"

=== Various Artists - Black Gangster (Soundtrack) ===
- "The Story" (told by DMX)

=== Various Artists - The Corruptor (soundtrack) ===
- "Men of Respect"
- "Feel the Rush"

=== DMX - ...And Then There Was X ===
- "Fame"
- "D-X-L (Hard White)"

== 2000 ==
=== Various artists - WWF Aggression ===
- "Ministry" (by Meeno)

=== Cam'ron - S.D.E. ===
- "My Hood" (featuring Jim Jones)

=== Capone-N-Noreaga - The Reunion ===
- "You Can't Kill Me"

== 2001 ==
=== Ms. Toi - That Girl ===
- "That Girl"
- "Bangin'"

=== Eve - Scorpion ===
- "You Ain't Gettin' None"

=== Mary J. Blige - No More Drama ===
- "Dance for Me"

=== DMX - The Great Depression ===
- "School Street"
- "Trina Moe"
- "Shorty Was da Bomb"
- "When I'm Nothing"

=== Various Artists - Exit Wounds (soundtrack) ===
- "Ain't No Sunshine" (by DMX)

== 2003 ==
=== Kelis - Tasty ===
- "Stick Up"

=== DJ Kay Slay - The Streetsweeper, Vol. 1 ===
- "The Champions" (featuring Brucie B, DJ Clue, DJ S&S, Doo Wop, Funkmaster Flex, Kid Capri, Ron & Tony Touch)
- "Coast to Coast Gangstas" (featuring Bun B, Joe Budden, Killer Mike, Sauce Money, WC and Hak Ditty)

=== Das EFX - How We Do ===
- "Greezy"

=== DJ Envy - The Desert Storm Mixtape: Blok Party, Vol. 1 ===
- "Deeper" (with DMX)

=== DMX - Grand Champ ===
- "We 'Bout to Blow"

=== Various Artists - Cradle 2 the Grave (soundtrack) ===
- "Hand That Rocks the Cradle" (rocked by Big Stan)

=== Yukmouth - Godzilla ===
- "Nothin' 2 a Boss"
- "Stuntastic"
- "Do It B.I."

== 2004 ==
=== LL Cool J - The DEFinition ===
- "1 in the Mornin'"

== 2005 ==
=== Funkmaster Flex - Car Show Tour ===
- "It's Nothing" (featuring Cam'ron & Juelz Santana)

== 2006 ==
=== J.R. Writer - History in the Making ===
- "Zoolander"

=== DMX - Year of the Dog... Again ===
- "Intro"
- "Walk These Dogs"
- "Life Be My Song"
- "Who Dat" (International bonus track)

=== Styles P - Time Is Money ===
- "Leave a Message"

== 2007 ==
=== Freeway - Free at Last ===
- "Roc-A-Fella Billionaires" (featuring Jay-Z)

=== DJ Drama - Gangsta Grillz: The Album ===
- "Takin' Pictures" (featuring Young Jeezy, Willie the Kid, JIm Jones, Rick Ross, Young Buck & T.I.)

=== N.O.R.E. - Noreality ===
- "Sour Diesel" (featuring Styles P)

=== Hell Rell - For the Hell of It ===
- "Streets Gonna Luv Me"

=== T.I. ===
- "Crown Me" (featuring Cam'ron & Juelz Santana)

=== Styles P - Super Gangster (Extraordinary Gentleman) / The Solution (Beanie Sigel album) ===
- "Shoot Niggas" (featuring Raw Buck)
- "U Ain't Ready 4 Me" (featuring Beanie Sigel)

== 2008 ==
=== Sheek Louch - Silverback Gorilla ===
- "What What"

=== Max B - Bloomberg Series: No Beefin' ===
- "Smoke with Me"
- "OG Kush (Super Sneak Peak)
- "Where Do I Go"

=== Nicole Wray ===
- "Stand Up"

=== Max B – Public Domain 3: Domain Pain ===
- "Paperwork"

=== Dame Grease & Max B - Goon Music 1.5 (The Doomship) ===
- "Goon Music (We Run NY)" (featuring French Montana)

=== LL Cool J - Exit 13 ===
- "Ur Only a Customer"

== 2009 ==
=== Max B – Quarantine ===
- "Fuckfaces 2K9" (featuring Dame Grease & Mack Mustard)
- "DJ Saved My Life" (featuring Mack Mustard)
- "Quarantined"

=== Max B - Public Domain 6: Walking the Plank ===
- "Dead Solver"

=== Kurious - II ===
- "Take What Is Given"
- "Rain on Me"
- "Back Up From Under"

== 2010 ==
=== Styles P & DJ Green Lantern - The Green Ghost Project ===
- "That's Me" (featuring S.I.)

=== Das Racist - Sit Down, Man ===
- "Rooftop" (featuring Despot)

=== DMX - Undisputed ===
- "Cold World" (featuring Andreena Mill)
- "I Get Scared" (featuring Rachel Taylor)
- "Have You Eva"
- "No Love" (featuring Andreena Mill)
- "Fire" (featuring Kashmere)

== 2011 ==
=== Max B - Vigilante Season ===
- "Tattoos on Her Ass"
- "Money Make Me Feel Better"
- "Where Do I Go (BBQ Music)"
- "White Lines" (featuring Al Pac)
- "Blowin' My High"
- "Live Comfortable"
- "You Won't Go Far" (featuring Al Pac)
- "Fuck You"
- "Baby I Need More"
- "Lord Is Tryna Tell Ya Somthin'"
- "I Need More Money"
- "South Wave"
- "Boss Don Season" (featuring E Snaps)

== 2012 ==
=== MGK - Lace Up ===
- "D3MONS" (featuring DMX)

=== Riff Raff & Dame Grease - Hologram Panda ===
- "GOT THEM MAD"
- "i CAN TELL STORiES"
- "TiGER BEAR GARGOYLE"
- "WHiTE SiLK PANTS"
- "CAN WE CHiLL"
- "GOiN' HAMiLTON"
- "VERSACE LiES"

== 2013 ==
=== Papoose - The Nacirema Dream ===
- "Motion Picture"

=== Ross Geez ===
- "Cali Breeze"

== 2016 ==
=== Termanology - More Politics ===
- "It's Quiet"

=== The Lox - Filthy America... It's Beautiful ===
- "Hard Life" (featuring Mobb Deep)

== 2017 ==
=== Raekwon - The Wild ===
- "M&N" (featuring P.U.R.E)

=== Masta Killa - Loyalty Is Royalty ===
- "OGs Told Me" (featuring Moe Roc & Boy Backs)

=== CHG Unfadable - Lifestyle ===
- "Guerrilla" (featuring Vita)

== 2018 ==
=== Method Man - Meth Lab Season 2: The Lithium ===
- "Grand Prix"

=== London Hill ===
- "Throw it Back" (featuring. Cjenkz)

== 2022 ==
=== Paul Wall & Termanology - Start 2 Finish ===
- "How You Been?"
