= Wave Gods 2: Cosmos Brothers =

Mixtape by French Montana and Max B
- Released: May 22, 2026
- Genre: Hip-hop
- Length: 76:25
- Labels: Coke Boys Records; Defiant Records

French Montana and Max B chronology
Coke Wave 3.5: Narcos (2026)	Wave Gods 2: Cosmos Brothers (2026)

Singles from Wave Gods 2: Cosmos Brothers
- 1. "Bet it All" Released: April 24, 2026; 2. "Smoking Pt. 2" Released: May 8, 2026; 3. "Go Ladies" Released: May 22, 2026

Wave Gods 2: Cosmos Brothers is a collaborative mixtape by rappers French Montana and Max B. Released on May 22, 2026, it serves as a sequel to Montana's 2016 mixtape Wave Gods. The 26-track project was released alongside the official video for the mixtape's single "Go Ladies." The release marks the duo's first full-length collaboration since Max B’s release from prison. Guest appearances include Rick Ross, Chase Belly, Chinx, The Isley Brothers, Ty Dolla Sign, and Kanye West.

The mixtape was supported by the singles "Bet it All", "Smoking pt. 2," and "Go Ladies." Accompanying the mixtape, the rappers announced a national co-headlining tour. Outlets such as HipHopCanada and Complex emphasize its melodic street sound and its rollout.

== Background and promotion ==
Max B and Montana maintained a close professional relationship. The duo released their first project, Coke Wave, in 2009. The project served as the first installment in what would later be known as the Coke Wave series. During Max B's imprisonment, Montana kept the "wave" theme active through his releases, including the 2016 mixtape Wave Gods. Their partnership continued following Max B's release, culminating in the creation of Wave Gods 2: Cosmos Brothers. The album's title originated from Max B's repeated use of the phrase "cosmic energy" during prison calls.

The rappers announced Wave Gods 2: Cosmos Brothers on April 2, 2026, via social media. The announcement followed Max B's return from prison in November 2025, leading to the duo reuniting. The project coincided with the Wave Gods: Narcos Tour, a summer co-headlining run scheduled to start on May 24. At the time of the announcement, the mixtape was also connected to the single “Ever Since U Left Me” for Coke Wave 3.5: Narcos, which had reached several charts. Hot97 described the release as pushing the duo's resurgence even further than their already close relationship.

=== Singles and previews ===
"Bet it All," featuring Chase Belly, was released on April 24, 2026, while "Smoking pt. 2" with Rick Ross debuted as a single on May 8 during a Verzuz event. "Unlocked", featuring Kanye West, was shared as a snippet through a post from the Complex Instagram account. The post also included the mixtape's track listing, feature list, and artwork. The third and final single, "Go Ladies," was premiered on May 22 through BET, accompanying the mixtape.

== Release ==
Wave Gods 2: Cosmos Brothers was originally set to be released on April 24, though it experienced delays. The mixtape was officially released on May 22, 2026, by Coke Boys Records in partnership with Defiant Records. The release was accompanied by the premiere of the music video for "Go Ladies".

== Music and lyrics ==
Wave Gods 2: Cosmos Brothers is a hip-hop mixtape, noted by Complex for its influences from Harlem and The Bronx. Similarly, The Source wrote that the duo "joined forces to bridge the gap between the Bronx and Harlem." HipHopCanada emphasized its continuation of the duo's legacy, closely associating it with the melodic street sound. Tallie Spencer of HotNewHipHop described the mixtape's style as "blending street rap with luxury-heavy production." Lyrically, the mixtape explores themes of luxury lifestyles, street survival, and hustling.

== Songs ==
Kanye West (pictured in 2026) provides a verse for the song "Unlocked."

The mixtape begins with an introduction, described by The Source as "a haunting female-led vocal intro." The intro transitions into “Smoking Pt. 2” featuring Rick Ross. “Smoking Pt. 2” features vocals from Montana and Max B alongside a verse from Ross. The "Cosmos Skit" explores the duo's reunion following a prolonged period of separation. "Unlocked" is a hip-hop song built around an aggressive beat with heavy bass, trap drums, and high-pitched synths. Montana, Max B, and West provide verses, centering on dynamic and witty lines, including references to ICE.

"Bet It All", featuring Chase Belly, is noted for its nostalgic production, featuring an upbeat and atmospheric instrumental. Montana, Max B, and Chase Belly input melodic, autotuned performances, exploring reflective themes. "Go Ladies" is described by The Source as "an infectious summer anthem" with a "melodic charm." The track contains a fast-paced instrumental with dynamic performances from the two rappers. The mixtape ends with a remix of the duo's single "Ever Since U Left Me", performed by American singer Ty Dolla $ign.

== Critical reception ==
Wave Gods 2: Cosmos Brothers received generally positive reviews, with music journalist Quincy Dominic of RatingsGameMusic crediting the rappers' chemistry, stating that "the project feels intentionally raw and loosely assembled," claiming that it works in the mixtape's favor. Similarly, Tallie Spencer of HotNewHipHop praised the duo's effectiveness. Preezy Brown of Vibe listed the mixtape on their list of "50 Hip-Hop and R&B Releases You Need On Your Playlist."

== Track listing ==
Wave Gods 2: Cosmos Brothers
No.	Title	Producer(s)	Length
1.	"Intro (Wave Gods 2)"	French Montana; Red Mcfly	0:30
2.	"Smoking pt. 2" (with Rick Ross)	Montana; Mcfly	3:21
3.	"Grimey"	Montana	2:34
4.	"Toastee"	Gerald "Gino" Devaughn Haddon; Jacquez "Q" Markel Swanigan	2:43
5.	"Fiasco"	Montana	2:43
6.	"Cosmos Skit"	Mcfly	1:54
7.	"Unlocked" (with Ye)	Boi-1da	2:49
8.	"London Nights"	Montana	2:52
9.	"Just a Lil Bit"	Montana	3:29
10.	"Bet It All" (with Chase Belly)	Montana	3:22
11.	"Go Ladies"	Dame Grease	2:27
12.	"You"	Montana	2:54
13.	"Never Had a Friend"	Montana; Mcfly	2:32
14.	"New Life Rule Skit"	Montana	0:56
15.	"Motion"	Montana	3:13
16.	"Who Do You Love" (with Chinx)	Grease	2:57
17.	"Made It Out"	Montana	3:20
18.	"We Gettin Money"	Montana; Mcfly	3:09
19.	"Break You Off"	London on da Track	1:57
20.	"Buss A Move"	Montana	2:39
21.	"So Amazing"	Isaiah "Turnmeupzayy" Garcia; Justin "Jdubz" Kessel	3:03
22.	"Tips"	Montana; Mcfly	2:57
23.	"Turn You On"	Montana	2:51
24.	"Addictive" (with The Isley Brothers)	Marley Marl	2:25
25.	"Private"	Tropdavinci	2:54
26.	"Ever Since U Left Me (West Coast Remix)" (featuring Ty Dolla Sign)	Johnny Goldstein	3:01
Total length:			76:25
