= We Fly High =

2006 single by Jim Jones

Single by Jim Jones

from the album Hustler's P.O.M.E. (Product of My Environment)
- A-side: "Reppin' Time"
- Released: October 21, 2006
- Recorded: 2006
- Genre: Hip hop, gangsta rap
- Length: 3:56
- Label: Koch/Diplomat
- Songwriters: Jim Jones, Zukhan Bey
- Producer: Zukhan Bey

Jim Jones singles chronology
| "I Love You" (2006) | "We Fly High" (2006) | "We Fly High (Remix)" (2006) |

Audio sample
- file; help

"We Fly High" is a song by American rapper Jim Jones, released as the lead single from his third studio album, Hustler's P.O.M.E. (Product of My Environment) (2006). The song is Jim Jones' highest-charting single to date, charting at number five on the Billboard Hot 100. It was written by Jones and produced by Zukhan Bey who produced his previous single, "Baby Girl".

== Music video ==
The music video was directed by Dale Resteghini (a.k.a. RAGE) and Jim Jones (a.k.a. CAPO). Several of Jones' cohorts, namely Cam'ron, Juelz Santana, Max B and Stack Bundles, all make cameo appearances. Jones' girlfriend at the time, Chrissy Lampkin, and his manager, Yandy Smith, of VH1's Love & Hip Hop fame also make appearances in the music video. Parts of the music video were filmed in front of a green screen.

== Charts ==
=== Weekly charts ===
| Chart (2006–2007) | Peak position |
|---|---|
| US Billboard Hot 100 | 5 |
| US Hot R&B/Hip-Hop Songs (Billboard) | 4 |
| US Hot Rap Songs (Billboard) | 1 |
| US Pop Airplay (Billboard) | 32 |
| US Rhythmic Airplay (Billboard) | 2 |

=== Year-end charts ===
| Chart (2006) | Position |
|---|---|
| US Hot R&B/Hip-Hop Songs (Billboard) | 93 |

| Chart (2007) | Position |
|---|---|
| US Billboard Hot 100 | 28 |
| US Hot R&B/Hip-Hop Songs (Billboard) | 33 |
| US Rhythmic (Billboard) | 21 |

== Certifications ==
| Region | Certification | Certified units/sales |
|---|---|---|
| Canada (Music Canada) | Gold | 40,000^{‡} |
| United States (RIAA) | Platinum | 1,000,000^{*} |
| United States (RIAA) Mastertone | Platinum | 1,000,000^{*} |
^{*} Sales figures based on certification alone.^{‡} Sales+streaming figures based on certification alone.

== Remix ==
"We Fly High (Remix)"

Single by Jim Jones featuring T.I., Diddy, Birdman and Young Dro

from the album A Dipset X-Mas
- Released: November 1, 2006
- Genre: Hip hop
- Length: 4:26 ("A Dipset X-Mas" Version); 4:35 (Main Version); 4:49 (Video Version)
- Label: Koch, Diplomat
- Songwriters: Jim Jones, Charly Wingate, Clifford Harris, Jr., Sean Combs, Bryan Williams, D'Juan Hart
- Producer: Zukhan-Bey

Jim Jones singles chronology
| "We Fly High" (2006) | "We Fly High (Remix)" (2006) | "Emotionless" (2007) |

T.I. singles chronology
| "Top Back (Remix)" (2006) | "We Fly High (Remix)" (2006) | "I'm a Flirt (Remix)" (2007) |

Diddy singles chronology
| "Tell Me" (2006) | "We Fly High (Remix)" (2006) | "Last Night" (2007) |

Birdman singles chronology
| "Stuntin' Like My Daddy" (2006) | "We Fly High (Remix)" (2006) | "Leather So Soft" (2006) |

Young Dro singles chronology
| "Top Back (Remix)" (2006) | "We Fly High (Remix)" (2006) | "Tell 'em What They Wanna Hear" (2006) |

The official remix of the song features fellow American rappers T.I., Diddy, Juelz Santana, Birdman and Young Dro. It is featured on Jim Jones' compilation album A Dipset X-Mas and released as its lead single. The album and digital download versions of the remix features an additional verse by Jermaine Dupri after Diddy's verse.

- Other Versions
  - "We Fly High" (NY Giants Remix)
  - "Brooklyn High" (Jim Jones Diss) (Jay-Z)
  - "We Fly High" (Beef Mix) (featuring Juelz Santana & Jim Jones)
  - "We Fly High" (Reggaeton Remix) (featuring Tego Calderón & Don Omar)
  - "We Fly High" (New Orleans) (Lil Wayne Remix) (Lil Wayne & Mack Maine)
  - "We Fly High" (Cassidy Remix) Cassidy
  - "Ballin' (Knicks In 5)" (featuring Zoe Spencer)

=== Remix music video ===
The remix video was directed by Dale Restighini (a.k.a. RAGE) and Jim Jones (a.k.a. CAPO), who directed the original. It premiered on December 1 on Access Granted on BET. The video contains an extra verse from Juelz Santana that was recorded for the Beef Mix. The music video has cameos from Lil Wayne, DJ Drama, J.R. Writer, & Trae. In the video, at the end while Jones is talking, he waves his hand in front of his face, in the style of Tony Yayo. Also, in some parts of the video, Jones, Birdman, Lil Wayne and Juelz Santana appear with a red bandanna hanging from their right pocket, probably referencing to the Bloods gang.

== Confrontation with Jay-Z ==
Soon after "We Fly High" was released, Jay-Z recorded a diss aimed at Jim Jones, entitled "Brooklyn High", over the same beat. The chorus contains the vocals of Jones and others, but the phrase "BALLIN'!" was replaced by Jay-Z yelling "Brooklyn!". The song is thought to be disrespectful of both Jones and Cam'ron, another Dipset hip hop artist.

Jim Jones has released a rebuttal to Jay-Z's song "Brooklyn High" also on the "We Fly High" beat. Less than a day after Jay-Z's retaliative record came out, Jim Jones and Juelz Santana released a remix called "We Fly High (Beef Mix)" in response to Jay-Z.

== Popularity ==
The song's popularity began throughout the US in October 2006 when the New York Giants' Michael Strahan and teammates began taking "jump shots" to celebrate sacks against the Washington Redskins. Because of this incident, the NFL issued a "clarification" two weeks later to remind the Giants that if their celebrations included two or more players, that they would be penalized for unsportsmanlike conduct.

The song is also popular across North America; when played in the clubs, it is typical for everyone to take "jump shots" when Jim Jones says "ballin'". The dance in the video along with the jump shot has been named the "Fadeaway" by Jones.

WWE's Montel Vontavious Porter, is known to do the "Fadeaway" jump shot before dropping an elbow on his opponent. The crowd often cheers "ballin'" before the elbow drop. Homicide celebrated with this song after defeating Bryan Danielson for the ROH World Championship in his hometown of New York City at the Manhattan Center. Combat Zone Wrestling group BLKOUT has also used the song as their entrance theme.

The song has become Jim Jones' most successful single to date, peaking at number 5 on the Billboard Hot 100, becoming his first top ten single. The single also remains his most successful single on the Hot R&B/Hip-Hop Singles & Tracks and Hot Rap Tracks, peaking at number 4 and number 1, respectively, and also ranked at number 1 on the Hot RingMasters chart. It has been certified Platinum by the RIAA, as a digital single and as a "Master Tone" (a.k.a. Ringtone).

Jones has also made a "We Fly High" remix for the New York Giants and a "We Fly High" reggaeton version remixed by the famous reggaeton producer; Nely 'El Arma Secreta', or 'The Secret Weapon', which features Jones, Tego Calderón and Don Omar.

On the BET show Rap City, The Game used the second verse from his new album Doctor's Advocate from the song "Too Much" while rapping on the "We Fly High" beat. It was also featured in the Electronic Arts game Def Jam Icon.

Soulja Boy's song "Report Card" samples the Ballin ad-lib.

In the second verse of the song "Billionaire", by American rapper Travie McCoy, McCoy can be heard saying "ballin" (in the same style as Jim Jones) while describing the different types of dollar bills he'd be counting and separating

In 2026, to celebrate his hometown New York Knicks winning the 2026 NBA Finals, Jones dropped a new version of the song, titled "Ballin' (Knicks In 5)" featuring Zoe Spencer.
