= A Dipset X-Mas =

Compilation album by Jim Jones
- Released: December 5, 2006
- Recorded: 2006
- Genre: Hip-hop
- Length: 41:19
- Label: Diplomats; Koch
- Producer: Amadeus; Arnold Mischkulnig; Bang; Bear One; Bob Perry; Hannon Lane; Twinz NY; V-Prod; Zukhan Bey

Jim Jones chronology
Hustler's P.O.M.E. (Product of My Environment) (2006)	A Dipset X-Mas (2006)	Harlem's American Gangster (2007)

Singles from A Dipset X-Mas
- 1. "We Fly High (Remix)" Released: November 2006

Professional ratings
Review scores
Source	Rating
AllHipHop	2.5/5 stars
AllMusic	2.5/5 stars

A Dipset X-Mas is a Christmas-themed hip-hop compilation album by American rapper Jim Jones. It was released on December 5, 2006 through Koch Records. Production was handled by Arnold Mischkulnig, Bob Perry, Twinz NY, Amadeus, Bang, Bear One, Hannon Lane, V-Prod and Zukhan Bey. Beside Jones, it features contributions from fellow ByrdGang members Mel Matrix, Stack Bundles and Max B, as well as 40 Cal., J.R. Writer, NOE, Rell, T.I., Puff Daddy, Jermaine Dupri, Birdman and Young Dro.

In the United States, the album made it to number 64 on the Top R&B/Hip-Hop Albums, number 28 on the Independent Albums and number 5 on the Top Holiday Albums charts.

== Track listing ==
No.	Title	Producer(s)	Length
1.	"Dipset X-mas Time" (performed by Jim Jones, Mel Matrix and Stack Bundles)	Bob Perry; Arnold Mischkulnig	4:01
2.	"Have a Happy Christmas" (performed by Stack Bundles and Mel Matrix)	Twinz Ny	3:10
3.	"Wish List" (performed by Jim Jones, Stack Bundles and Mel Matrix)	Amadeus	4:15
4.	"Ballin' on Xmas" (performed by Jim Jones, Stack Bundles and J.R. Writer)	Twinz Ny	3:35
5.	"If Everyday Was Xmas" (performed by Jim Jones, Rell, Mel Matrix and Stack Bundles)	Bang	4:59
6.	"We Get Money" (performed by Jim Jones and Max B.)	Bob Perry; Arnold Mischkulnig	4:35
7.	"Too High" (performed by Jim Jones, Max B. and 40 Cal.)	Bear One	4:22
8.	"City Boys" (performed by Jim Jones, NOE and Mel Matrix)	V-Prod	4:13
9.	"We Fly High (Remix)" (performed by Jim Jones, T.I., Diddy, Jermaine Dupri, Baby and Young Dro)	Zukhan Bey	4:26
10.	"Letter to the Game" (performed by Max B.)	Hannon Lane	3:43
Total length:			41:19

== Charts ==
Chart (2006)	Peak position
US Top R&B/Hip-Hop Albums (Billboard)	64
US Independent Albums (Billboard)	28
US Top Holiday Albums (Billboard)	5
