= List of Billboard number-one R&B/hip-hop albums of 2006 =

This page lists the albums that reached number one on the Top R&B/Hip-Hop Albums and Top Rap Albums charts in 2006. The Rap Albums chart partially serves as a distillation of rap-specific titles from the overall R&B/Hip-Hop Albums chart.

== Chart history ==
Key
| † | Indicates best-performing album of 2006 |

| Issue date | R&B/Hip-Hop Albums | Artist(s) | Rap Albums | Artist(s) | Refs. |
|---|---|---|---|---|---|
| January 7 | The Breakthrough † | Mary J. Blige | Duets: The Final Chapter | The Notorious B.I.G. | |
| January 14 | Unpredictable | Jamie Foxx | Duets: The Final Chapter | The Notorious B.I.G. | |
| January 21 | Unpredictable | Jamie Foxx | Duets: The Final Chapter | The Notorious B.I.G. | |
| January 28 | The Breakthrough † | Mary J. Blige | Duets: The Final Chapter | The Notorious B.I.G. | |
| February 4 | Unpredictable | Jamie Foxx | Duets: The Final Chapter | The Notorious B.I.G. | |
| February 11 | Unpredictable | Jamie Foxx | Duets: The Final Chapter | The Notorious B.I.G. | |
| February 18 | In My Mind | Heather Headley | Duets: The Final Chapter | The Notorious B.I.G. | |
| February 25 | The Breakthrough † | Mary J. Blige | On Top of Our Game | Dem Franchize Boyz | |
| March 4 | Ghetto Classics | Jaheim | On Top of Our Game | Dem Franchize Boyz | |
| March 11 | Ghetto Classics | Jaheim | On Top of Our Game | Dem Franchize Boyz | |
| March 18 | In My Own Words | Ne-Yo | On Top of Our Game | Dem Franchize Boyz | |
| March 25 | Reality Check | Juvenile | Reality Check | Juvenile | |
| April 1 | My Ghetto Report Card | E-40 | My Ghetto Report Card | E-40 | |
| April 8 | 3121 | Prince | The Heart of tha Streetz, Vol. 1 | B.G. | |
| April 15 | King | T.I. | King † | T.I. | |
| April 22 | King | T.I. | King † | T.I. | |
| April 29 | King | T.I. | King † | T.I. | |
| May 6 | King | T.I. | King † | T.I. | |
| May 13 | Director | Avant | King † | T.I. | |
| May 20 | Blood Money | Mobb Deep | Blood Money | Mobb Deep | |
| May 27 | Baby Makin' Music | The Isley Brothers featuring Ronald Isley | Blood Money | Mobb Deep | |
| June 3 | Killa Season | Cam'ron | Killa Season | Cam'ron | |
| June 10 | Killa Season | Cam'ron | Killa Season | Cam'ron | |
| June 17 | Killa Season | Cam'ron | Killa Season | Cam'ron | |
| June 24 | New Joc City | Yung Joc | New Joc City | Yung Joc | |
| July 1 | The Big Bang | Busta Rhymes | The Big Bang | Busta Rhymes | |
| July 8 | Journey of a Gemini | Donell Jones | Light Poles and Pine Trees | Field Mob | |
| July 15 | Testimony: Vol. 1, Life & Relationship | India.Arie | The Big Bang | Busta Rhymes | |
| July 22 | Testimony: Vol. 1, Life & Relationship | India.Arie | New Joc City | Yung Joc | |
| July 29 | Pimpalation | Pimp C | Pimpalation | Pimp C | |
| August 5 | Pimpalation | Pimp C | Pimpalation | Pimp C | |
| August 12 | LeToya | LeToya | In My Mind | Pharrell Williams | |
| August 19 | Year of the Dog... Again | DMX | Year of the Dog... Again | DMX | |
| August 26 | Port of Miami | Rick Ross | Port of Miami | Rick Ross | |
| September 2 | The Phoenix | Lyfe Jennings | Port of Miami | Rick Ross | |
| September 9 | Idlewild | Soundtrack / Outkast | Idlewild | Soundtrack / Outkast | |
| September 16 | Best Thang Smokin' | Young Dro | Best Thang Smokin' | Young Dro | |
| September 23 | B'Day | Beyoncé | Best Thang Smokin' | Young Dro | |
| September 30 | FutureSex/LoveSounds | Justin Timberlake | Port of Miami | Rick Ross | |
| October 7 | FutureSex/LoveSounds | Justin Timberlake | Lupe Fiasco's Food & Liquor | Lupe Fiasco | |
| October 14 | 20 Y.O. | Janet | Release Therapy | Ludacris | |
| October 21 | The Makings of Me | Monica | Release Therapy | Ludacris | |
| October 28 | Rotten Apple | Lloyd Banks | Rotten Apple | Lloyd Banks | |
| November 4 | Press Play | Diddy | Press Play | Diddy | |
| November 11 | Once Again | John Legend | Bad Azz | Lil Boosie | |
| November 18 | Like Father, Like Son | Birdman and Lil Wayne | Like Father, Like Son | Birdman and Lil Wayne | |
| November 25 | Hustler's P.O.M.E. (Product of My Environment) | Jim Jones | Hustler's P.O.M.E. (Product of My Environment) | Jim Jones | |
| December 2 | Doctor's Advocate | The Game | Doctor's Advocate | The Game | |
| December 9 | Kingdom Come | Jay-Z | Kingdom Come | Jay-Z | |
| December 16 | Kingdom Come | Jay-Z | Kingdom Come | Jay-Z | |
| December 23 | Ciara: The Evolution | Ciara | Eminem Presents: The Re-Up | Shady Records / Various artists | |
| December 30 | The Inspiration | Young Jeezy | The Inspiration | Young Jeezy | |

== See also ==
- 2006 in music
- 2006 in hip hop music
- List of number-one R&B singles of 2006 (U.S.)
- List of Billboard 200 number-one albums of 2006
