= Coke Wave =

Mixtape by French Montana and Max B
- Released: February 6, 2009
- Genre: Hip-hop
- Label: Cocaine City Records, Gain Greene, DJ Whoo Kid
- Producer: Dame Grease; Young Los; J. Cardim; Rome

French Montana chronology
Live From Africa (2008)	Coke Wave (2009)	The Laundry Man (2009)

Max B chronology
Goon Music 1.5: The Doomship (2008)	Coke Wave (2009)	Quarantine (2009)

Coke Wave is a collaborative mixtape by rappers French Montana and Max B. The mixtape was announced in 2008 and released on February 6, 2009. It features guest appearances from Mak Mustard, Dame Grease, Meeno, E-Snaps, and Maino. Producers on the project include Dame Grease, J. Cardim, Young Los, and Rome.

== Critical reception ==
Coke Wave received mixed reviews from music critics. While initially met with skepticism, it has managed to garner a sizeable cult following among listeners. David Drake of Complex magazine commended the "strategic alignment" between French and Max B, and complimented Max's songwriting and "slurred, sing-song style", comparing it to a "slick, casual delivery of a drunken street poet." In contrast, Infamous O of XXL magazine was not a fan of the former's slurred delivery style or attempts at harmonizing, but complimented French for his energy and style. David Drake praised the artists' and producer Dame Grease's ability to take instrumentals from varying genres and reinvent them into new molds, such as Marvin Gaye's "I Want You", which became the inspiration for "I Warned U", or Sting's "Englishman in New York", which became the track "We Run NY". The latter of which, with its Branford Marsalis saxophone and French Montana hook, he termed "one of the grittiest, catchiest New York street anthems in recent memory."

In 2013, Complex magazine listed the mixtape at #33 on its list of "The 50 Best Rapper Mixtapes". In 2016, Pitchfork listed the mixtape at #49 on its "The 50 Best Rap Mixtapes of the Millennium" list.

== Track listing ==
No.	Title	Producer(s)	Length
1.	"Intro"		2:29
2.	"Stake Sauce"	J. Cardim	2:58
3.	"It Gotta Be"	Dame Grease	3:21
4.	"Skit I"		3:38
5.	"Goon Music" (featuring Dame Grease, Meeno and E-Snaps)	Dame Grease	3:31
6.	"God Damn" (featuring Maino)		3:49
7.	"Do for Drugs"	Dame Grease	3:06
8.	"Battlefield"		4:21
9.	"Bar Smoking"	Dame Grease	4:33
10.	"Here It Is"	Young Los	3:42
11.	"Bricks & Walls"	Dame Grease	4:12
12.	"Skit II"		3:48
13.	"Been Around The World"		4:50
14.	"I Warned U"	Dame Grease	5:18
15.	"Bury Me a G" (featuring Dame Grease)	Dame Grease	2:33
16.	"All I Wanna"		4:19
17.	"We Waveyy" (featuring Mak Mustard)		3:48
18.	"Security"	J. Cardim	4:25
19.	"We Run NY" (featuring Dame Grease)	Dame Grease
20.	"Hold On"	Rome
