= Get'em Daddy =

Single by Cam'ron

from the album Killa Season
- Released: 2006
- Recorded: 2005
- Genre: Hip hop
- Length: 4:40
- Label: Diplomat; Asylum; Atlantic
- Songwriter(s): John L. Christopher; Cameron Giles
- Producer(s): I.N.F.O. & NOVA

Cam'ron singles chronology
"Touch It Or Not" (2006)	"Get'em Daddy" (2006)	"Wet Wipes" (2007)

"Get'em Daddy" is a single by Cam'ron. A remix of the song appears on Cam'ron’s fifth studio album, Killa Season. On the remix of the song, he tells about the night he was shot in Washington, D.C. The remix also features Jim Jones, J.R. Writer and Hell Rell.
