= Love in the First =

Studio album by Latif
- Released: September 23, 2003
- Length: 52:10
- Label: Motown
- Producer: Adonis; Teddy Bishop; Andy C; David Chance; Greg Charley; Mechalie Jamison; Ryan Leslie; Matthew "Matlock" Robinson; D. "French" Spencer

Singles from Love in the First
- 1. "I Don't Wanna Hurt You" Released: 2003

Love in the First is the debut studio album by American R&B artist Latif. It was released by Motown on September 23, 2003, in the United States. The album peaked at number 67 on the US Top R&B/Hip-Hop Albums chart.

== Promotion ==
The album's only single, "I Don't Wanna Hurt You" was written by Sean Garrett and Latif. About the creation of this song, Latif commented that Garrett "listened to what I was going through and helped translated that into this beautiful song."

== Critical reception ==
Professional ratings
Review scores
Source	Rating
AllMusic	2.5/5 stars

AllMusic editor John Bush wrote that Love in the First "smacks of an A&R system that treats singers as grist for the mill. Love in the First features a fair trailer single ("I Don't Wanna Hurt You"), and the lyrics or set-up for many of the other songs reveal a quest for all manner of variations on the basic this-love-won't-work theme ("Without U," "My Sister's Girlfriend," "My Man's Girl"). Tied to weak arrangements, though, no doubt cribbed third-hand from the work of vocalists ranging from Usher to D'Angelo, Latif isn't allowed to show how he's different from his contemporary R&B predecessors."

== Commercial performance ==
Love in the First debuted and peaked at number 67 on the Top R&B/Hip-Hop Albums chart.

== Track listing ==
Love in the First track listing
No.	Title	Writer(s)	Producer(s)	Length
1.	"I Don't Wanna Hurt You"	Corey Latif Williams; El Debarge; Etterlene Jordan; Greg Charley; Sean Garrett; Teddy Bishop	Bishop	4:53
2.	"Who's Loving Her Now"	Charley; Johnta Austin	Charley	3:57
3.	"It's Alright"	Williams; Ryan Leslie	Leslie	4:06
4.	"Without You"	Williams; David Chance; Bro Don Muhammad; Leland Robinson; Matthew "Matlock" Robinson	Chance; M. Robinson; Muhammad^{[a]}; L. Robinson^{[a]}	4:57
5.	"Can't Let Love"	Williams; Andy Cramer; Kenneth Gamble; Leon A. Huff; Mechalie Jamison	Andy C; Jamison	4:01
6.	"Girl"	Demetrius "French" Spencer; Sean Garrett	Spencer	3:14
7.	"Put Me On"	Williams; Adonis Shropshire; Bryan Michael Cox	Adonis; Cox	3:52
8.	"My Man's Girl"	Shropshire; Eric "Cire" Crawford; Lloyd Polite	Adonis	3:24
9.	"Love in the First"	Williams; Shropshire	Adonis	4:25
10.	"My Sister's Girlfriend"	Williams; Spencer; Garrett	Spencer	3:57
11.	"Rain Will Go Away"	Williams; Leslie	Leslie	3:26
12.	"Heavenly"	Williams; Leslie	Leslie	4:34
13.	"I Don't Blame You"	Williams; Leslie	Leslie	3:24

Notes

- ^{^[a]} signifies a co-producer

Samples

- "I Don't Wanna Hurt You" embodies portions of "Time Will Reveal," as performed by DeBarge.
- "Can't Let Love" contains a sample of "Let's Get Together Soon" as performed by Harold Melvin & the Blue Notes.

== Charts ==
Weekly chart performance for Love in the First
Chart (2003)	Peak position
US Top R&B/Hip-Hop Albums (Billboard)	67
