= Latif (singer) =

- Williams in 2007

Background information
- Born: Corey Latif Williams
- Genres: Soul, R&B, hip hop, pop
- Occupations: Singer, record producer, actor, songwriter
- Instruments: Vocals, piano
- Years active: 2003–present
- Label: Universal Motown Records / AWAL

Corey Latif Williams, known professionally as Latif, is an American R&B singer and Grammy nominated songwriter. He was the winner of Teen People's Who's Next contest. He was a mentee of Teddy Pendergrass. He was once signed to Universal Motown Records.

== Biography ==
Latif was born in Philadelphia, Pennsylvania. His early passion for music came mainly from his parents, who, ironically, were not musically inclined. This passion for music developed into an interest in singing. A close friend of Latif's family, Teddy Pendergrass, served as a mentor for the young budding artist. It was this mentorship that taught Latif how to "deliver" songs. This relationship was nurtured by Latif being taken along with Teddy to various interviews and appearances. It was this that led to Latif being noticed by the daughter of a label executive. Which brought about his first recording contract with Sony/550.

Latif was given a demo deal, which helped him hone his writing skills, and gave him knowledge about the recording process. Latif's vocals were featured in a highly popular commercial for a local bank.

In 2001, the buzz from winning the competition was enough to draw the eye of Kedar Massenburg. This actually worked out well for Latif, because the "taste of spotlight" from the performance convinced him to tell his parents that he did not want to go back to Berklee College of Music. He wanted work on his music full-time. His mother gave him one semester to prove himself, or he had to go back to school. Massenburg became interested in Latif, and signed him to Universal Motown Records.

Latif's debut album on Universal Motown was called Love in the First. Only one single, "I Don't Wanna Hurt You" was released. It was mainly written by Latif, with production by Ryan Leslie, Bryan-Michael Cox, Adonis Shropshire, Greg Charley, Andy C, Teddy Bishop, Mechalie Jamison, D "French" Spencer, and Sean Garrett.

Latif is no longer signed to Universal Motown Records. He has garnered a large fanbase overseas. One song that may be attributed to his international popularity is "U Think U Know". He has also continued to write for other artists, such as JoJo, Cassie, The Roots, Jim Jones, Joey Bada$$, Usher, Trey Songz, Chris Brown, Faith Evans, and Musiq Soulchild to name a few. He has signed a co-publishing deal with Universal Music Publishing Group (UMPG). In 2017, he teamed with friend and fellow writer-producer Aaron Kleinstaub to form duo Lo Boii. The band is signed to London-based label AWAL. Its first single "Floor Seats" dropped in April 2019.

== Discography ==
=== Albums ===
List of studio albums, with selected details
Title	Album details	Peak positions
Title	Album details	US R&B
Love in the First	Released: September 23, 2003; Label: Motown; Formats: CD, digital download	67
Love Is Love	Released: March 9, 2010; Label: H.U.R.L.; Formats: CD, digital download	—
Love Life	Released: August 31, 2011; Label: H.U.R.L.; Formats: CD, digital download	—
IV Love	Released: January 9, 2013; Label: H.U.R.L.; Formats: CD, digital download	—
Love Language	Released: November 20, 2015; Label: Manhattan; Formats: CD, digital download	—

=== EPs ===
List of extended plays, with selected details
Title	Extended play details
Philadelphia Healing	Released: June 11, 2015; Label: H.U.R.L.; Formats: Digital download

=== Mixtapes ===
- Breath of Fresh Air (2010)
- LATIF – The Leaks – H.U.R.L. & Love Songs Vol. 1 (2011)

=== Singles ===
- "I Don't Wanna Hurt You" (2003)
- "Think U Know" (2006)
- "Promise Me" (2010)
- "Without You" (2003)
- "Don't Wanna Be" (2010)
- "One Kiss" (2011)
- "Crazy Love" (2011)
- "Above & Beyond" (2012)
- "Deejay" (2015)
- "More Than Perfect" (2016)

=== Features ===
- – * hooks written by Latif

Title	Artist	Album/Mixtape	Released
My Life*	Memphis Bleek	M.A.D.E.	2003
Why (What's Goin On?)*	The Roots	The Tipping Point	2004
Lil' Daddy*	Young City (aka Chopper)	Hustle & Flow OST	2005
Honey Dip*	Jim Jones	Harlem: Diary of a Summer	2005
Babygirl	SunN.Y.	Overnight Celebrity	2005
Paper Touchin*	Red Cafe	Non-album single	2007
I Want You More*	Akay	Comfort Zone	2008
Strippin in the Club	DJ Diamond Kuts (Feat. Nicki Minaj & Ron Browz)	Her-Story in the Making	2009
What Should I Do*	Young Chris	The Network 2	2010
Dream Me There*	Audio Push	The Backstage Pass (Hosted by DJ ill Will & DJ Rockstar)	2010
We Keep It Rockin*	Maino (Feat. Swizz Beatz, Jadakiss, Jim Jones & Joell Ortiz)	Keep It Rockin' EP	2011
One Two Many*	Sir Michael Rocks	The Rocks Report	2011
S.S.*	Sir Michael Rocks	The Rocks Report	2011
Antidote*	Sir Michael Rocks	Premier Politics 1.5	2012
Where's Summer?*	Brandun Deshay	Reebok Classics 2012	2012
Expensive Taste*	Beanie Sigel	This Time	2012
Christmas in Compton (Theme Song)*	Kumasi Simmons	Christmas in Compton – Movie	2012

=== Selected Co-Writer Credits ===
Title	Artist	Album	Released
My Life	Memphis Bleek	M.A.D.E.	2003
I Don't Wanna Hurt You	Latif	Love in the First	2003
Why (What's Goin On?)	The Roots	The Tipping Point	2004
Lil' Daddy	Young City (aka Chopper)	Hustle & Flow OST	2005
Honey Dip	Jim Jones	Harlem: Diary of a Summer	2005
I Love You	Cheri Dennis	In and Out of Love	2006
Like That	JoJo	The High Road	2006
Ditto	Cassie	Cassie	2006
G-S*** (Hook)	Lil Scrappy	Bred 2 Die Born 2 Live	2006
Teach Me	Musiq Soulchild	Luvanmusiq	2007
Rewind	Musiq Soulchild	Luvanmusiq	2007
Damage	Chris Brown	Exclusive	2007
Pretend	Cheri Dennis	In and Out of Love	2007
Laid Back & Chill	Tiffany Evans	Tiffany Evans	2008
Homework	Prima J	Prima J	2008
Deserveumore	Musiq Soulchild	OnMyRadio	2008
Qu'est-Ce Qu'on Attend	Sheryfa Luna	Vénus	2008
Someday	Elliott Yamin	Fight for Love	2009
Il Y A Des Jours	Sheryfa Luna	Si tu me vois	2010
For The Sake Of Love	Trey Songz	Love King (Mixtape)	2010
Gone Already	Faith Evans	Something About Faith	2010
Promise Me	Latif	Love is Love (Japan)	2010
I Don't Wanna Be	Latif	Love Is Love (Japan)	2010
One Kiss	Latif	Love Life (Japan)	2011
Crazy Love	Latif	Love Life (Japan)	2011
Expensive Taste	Beanie Sigel	This Time	2012
Christmas in Compton (Theme Song)	Kumasi Simmons	"Christmas in Compton" Movie	2012
Above & Beyond	Latif	IV Love (Japan)	2012
Can't Say Love	Glenn Lewis	Moment of Truth	2013
Complicated	Raheem Devaughn	A Place Called Loveland	2013
Bad Thing Feat. Joey Bada$$	Kiesza	Sound of a Woman	2014
After I Met U	Snakehips	Non-album single	2014
Teach Me Feat. Kiesza	Joey Bada$$	B4.Da.$$	2015
Deejay	Latif	Love Language (Japan)	2016
More Than Perfect	Latif	Love Language (Japan)	2016
Crash	Usher	Hard II Love	2016
One More Try (Featuring Boyz II Men)	Bell Biv Devoe	Three Stripes	2017
10,000 Hours	Jule Vera	Waiting on the Sun	2017
Running	Jule Vera	Waiting on the Sun	2017
Obsession	The XI		2017
God Bless the Internet	Saint Jhn	Collection One	2018
Hurt People	Two Feet	A 20 Something Fuck (Part 1)	2018
Young & Rude	Abir	MINT	2018
For Ya	Abir	MINT	2018
Floor Seats	Lo Boii	Sex Doesn't Sell... Anymore	2019
Sweeter	Lo Boii	Sex Doesn't Sell... Anymore	2019
Chakra	Lo Boii	Sex Doesn't Sell... Anymore	2019
Open Mind	Wonho	Love Synonym Pt. 1: Right for Me	2020
Save Us	Lo Boii	TBA	2020
Maybe	Lo Boii	TBA	2020
Love Paradox	Lo Boii	TBA	2021
Too Attached	Lo Boii	TBA	2021
I Forgive You	Lo Boii	TBA	2022
Nothing Without You	J. Brown (American singer)	Chapter & Verse	2022
Treat Me Right	Camryn Levert	My Oasis	2023
Requiem	Khamari	A Brief Nirvana	2023
Mesmerized	Calico Dê Parker	TBA	2023
Harrison Ford	Calico Dê Parker	TBA	2023
Lo Boii Suite No.13 in C Major:All Night	Lo Boii	TBA	2024
sins and smiles	geographics	TBA	2025
9 to 6	geographics	TBA	2025

== Grammy Awards And nominations ==
The Grammy Awards are awarded annually by the National Academy of Recording Arts and Sciences of the United States. Latif has received 2 nominations.

Year	Nominee / work	Award	Result
2008	Teachme	Best R&B Song	Nominated
2011	Gone Already	Best Female R&B Vocal Performance	Nominated
