= Vigilante Season =

Studio album by Max B
- Released: March 22, 2011
- Recorded: 2008
- Genre: Hip-hop
- Length: 62:25
- Label: Amalgam Digital
- Producer: Dame Grease, Young Los, Whitey

Professional ratings
Review scores
Source	Rating
Fact	4/10
Pitchfork	7.7/10

Vigilante Season is the debut studio album by American rapper Max B. It was released on March 22, 2011, by Amalgam Digital. In 2008, the album was recorded and finished, after Max B left ByrdGang Records, after a falling out with founder and label-mate Jim Jones. The additional productions were handled by Dame Grease, Young Los and Whitey, among others.

== Track listing ==
No.	Title	Producer(s)	Length
1.	"Model of Entropy" (featuring Young Riot)	Whitey	3:45
2.	"Tattoos on Her Ass"	Dame Grease	5:05
3.	"Money Make Me Feel Better"	Dame Grease	3:34
4.	"Where Do I Go (BBQ Music)"	Dame Grease	5:09
5.	"White Lines" (featuring Al Pac)	Dame Grease	3:41
6.	"Blowin' My High"	Dame Grease	4:37
7.	"Live Comfortable"	Dame Grease	3:28
8.	"You Won't Go" (featuring Al Pac)	Dame Grease	4:34
9.	"Fuck You"	Dame Grease	3:33
10.	"Porno Muzik"	Young Los	3:03
11.	"Baby I Need More"	Dame Grease	3:22
12.	"Green Gain"	Young Los	3:55
13.	"Lord Is Tryna Tell You Something"	Dame Grease	3:22
14.	"I Need More Money"	Dame Grease	3:07
15.	"South Wave"	Dame Grease	3:01
16.	"Boss Don Season" (featuring E-Snaps)	Dame Grease	5:08
