= Car Show Tour =

Carshow Tour

Compilation album by Funkmaster Flex
- Released: December 6, 2005
- Recorded: 2004–05
- Genre: Hardcore hip hop
- Length: 62:34
- Label: Koch
- Producer: Funkmaster Flex (also exec.); Joie Manda (also exec.); Monica Taylor (also exec.); Alchemist; Chubb; Cipha Sounds; Dame Grease; David Banner; DJ Bobby Trends; DJ Khalil; DVLP; Emile; Filthy; Ill Will Fulton; Red Spyda; Rockwilder; Ron Browz; Salaam Remi; Supa Mario; Vinny Idol; The Trackdealers

Funkmaster Flex chronology
60 Minutes of Funk, Volume IV: The Mixtape (2000)	Carshow Tour (2005)

Singles from Carshow Tour
- 1. "Bring It Back" Released: April 27, 2004

Professional ratings
Review scores
Source	Rating
RapReviews	7.5/10

Car Show Tour is a compilation album by American DJ Funkmaster Flex. It was released on December 6, 2005, via Koch Records, along with a DVD that features a documentary about a Miami car and hip hop show hosted by Funk Flex.

Production was handled by several record producers, including DVLP, Alchemist, Cipha Sounds, Dame Grease, DJ Khalil, Emile, Red Spyda, Ron Browz and Salaam Remi.

It features guest appearances from The Diplomats, The Lox, 50 Cent, Beanie Sigel, David Banner, Elephant Man, Fabolous, Jae Millz, J-Hood, Lil Wayne, Maino, Mobb Deep, Nas, O-Solo, Rockwilder, Papoose, Paul Wall, Strong Arm Steady, T.I. and Xzibit.

The album peaked at #41 on the Top R&B/Hip-Hop Albums and #9 on the Independent Albums, while 50 Cent's "Just a Touch" reached #72 on the Hot R&B/Hip-Hop Songs.

== Track listing ==
No.	Title	Producer(s)	Length
1.	"Just a Touch" (performed by 50 Cent and Paul Wall)	Alchemist	3:28
2.	"It's Nothing" (performed by Cam'ron and Juelz Santana)	Dame Grease	3:51
3.	"Kiss Your Ass Goodbye (Remix)" (performed by Sheek Louch, Fabolous, Beanie Sigel and T.I.)	Red Spyda	4:15
4.	"We Be Gettin' Chips" (performed by Jim Jones and Max B)	DVLP	4:26
5.	"Talking Sideways" (performed by Mobb Deep)	Ill Will Fulton	3:24
6.	"Talk of New York" (performed by Nas)	Salaam Remi	3:54
7.	"Bring It Back" (performed by Jae Millz and Jadakiss)	Ron Browz	3:57
8.	"Line of Fire" (performed by Hell Rell and J.R. Writer)	Chubb	4:35
9.	"D.B.L.O.C.K." (performed by The LOX and J-Hood)	Supa Mario; Vinny Idol	4:59
10.	"Bird Call" (performed by J.R. Writer and Lil Wayne)	DVLP; Filthy	4:01
11.	"The Way We Roll" (performed by Elephant Man)	Cipha Sounds	3:25
12.	"Can't Ride Like Me" (performed by Papoose)	Emile	2:43
13.	"Definition of a Thug" (performed by Maino)	DJ Bobby Trends; The Trackdealers^{[a]}	4:07
14.	"Hurry Hurry" (performed by Xzibit and Strong Arm Steady)	DJ Khalil	5:08
15.	"Two in Ya Body" (performed by David Banner)	David Banner	3:07
16.	"6 Minutes" (performed by O-Solo)	Rockwilder	3:14
Total length:			1:02:34

Notes

- ^{^[a]} signifies a co-producer.

== Charts ==
Chart (2005)	Peak position
US Top R&B/Hip-Hop Albums (Billboard)	41
US Top Rap Albums (Billboard)	24
US Independent Albums (Billboard)	9
