= Killa Season =

Studio album by Cam'ron
- Released: May 16, 2006
- Recorded: 2005–2006
- Genre: Hip hop
- Length: 70:14
- Labels: Diplomats; New Era; Asylum
- Producers: Cam'ron (exec.); Pro-V; Ty Fyffe; BlackOut Movement; Charlmagne; Peersonile; The Alchemist; BBanga; I.N.F.O. & NOVA; The Heatmakerz; Big Tyme; The Beat Firm; Stay Gettin' Productions; Chad Hamilton; Sancochito's Ent.; Boola

Cam'ron chronology
Purple Haze (2004)	Killa Season (2006)	Crime Pays (2009)

Alternative cover art

Killa Season is the fifth studio album by Harlem rapper Cam'ron. The album was released on May 16, 2006, by Diplomat Records and Asylum Records. Cam'ron was also the executive producer of the album. The album received positive reviews but critics found the production and content lesser compared to Purple Haze. Killa Season sold 114,000 copies in its first week, debuting at number two on the Billboard 200.

== Critical reception ==
Professional ratings
Review scores
Source	Rating
AllMusic	3.5/5 stars
HipHopDX	3/5 stars
The Phoenix	2.5/4 stars
Pitchfork	6.7/10
RapReviews	7/10
Rolling Stone	3/5 stars
Stylus Magazine	B−

Killa Season garnered a positive reception but music critics were mixed toward Cam's choices in production and lyrical content compared to Purple Haze. Peter Relic of Rolling Stone found criticism in the album's production and soul samples and Cam's insults towards Jay-Z but still found it entertaining with its wordplay, saying that "Killa Season proves Cam'ron can still bring heady verbiage and heat, but it's doubtful Jay-Z is losing much sleep." While also finding the production decent, Brian Sims of HipHopDX praised the album's skits and hooks and Cam's delivery for bringing light to creative imagery, saying that "As an industry veteran, Cam deserves a lot of credit for not using his album to address petty squabbles or provide some pseudo-intellectual autobiography." AllMusic editor David Jeffries said that the album was in need of a rewrite on some tracks but still found it enjoyable with memorable hooks and for showing a vulnerable side in Cam, concluding that "Killa Season would have benefited from trimming and better planning, but those things are extremely rare in the world of Dipset. Taking that into account, the album is exceptional and a good enough excuse for two more years of mouthing off and starting trouble."

Steve 'Flash' Juon of RapReviews praised the album for continuing Purple Haze's formula with tight wordplay and loose soul sample production, despite containing tracks that were Dipset holdovers, concluding that, "Nonetheless Cam fans should be happy with Killa Season, an album which continues his recent trend of solid (if somewhat unspectacular) solo CD's." Jayson Greene of Stylus Magazine found some of Cam's lyrics humorous at times, but found the production and guest artists lacking in variety in terms of go-to names, concluding with "Instead, Killa Season is a retreat, an album to satisfy the converted but one that will keep his mythical status confined to the 12-mile radius of his Manhattan home." Pitchfork writer Ryan Dombal felt the album was a disappointment compared to Purple Haze, finding the production lacking in energy and in need of more humorous songs ("I.B.S.") then aggressive diss tracks ("You Gotta Love It"). Dombal also pointed out that the limited edition of the album contained a DVD that reveals Cam'ron's battle with Jay-Z was all for publicity, concluding that, "If this underwhelming offering is any indication, such blind self-reference has considerably slowed down Cam'ron's once-unstoppable Dipset Movement."

== Track listing ==
Killa Season Track listing
No.	Title	Writer(s)	Producer(s)	Length
1.	"Killa Cam (Intro)" (featuring 40 Cal.)	Cameron Giles	Pro-V	5:01
2.	"He Tried to Play Me" (featuring Hell Rell)	Giles; Durrell Mohammad	Charlmagne; Charles "C Roc" Harrison (co.)	3:43
3.	"Leave You Alone"	Giles; Deadric Malone	Blackout Movement	3:24
4.	"Living a Lie" (featuring Mo Money)	Giles	Ty Fyffe	4:32
5.	"We Make Change" (featuring Juelz Santana)	Giles; LaRon James; Jonathan Dugger; Chris Andrews	Jonathan Dugger	3:10
6.	"Voicemail (Interlude)"			2:04
7.	"Wet Wipes"	Giles; Alan Maman	The Alchemist	3:35
8.	"Touch It or Not" (also known as "Suck It or Not") (featuring Lil Wayne)	Giles; Dwayne Carter	Headbangaz Entertainment	3:41
9.	"War" (featuring Hell Rell)	Giles; Muhammed	NOVA	3:51
10.	"Triple Up" (featuring 40 Cal.)	Giles; Calvin Byrd; Kenneth Gamble; Leon Huff; Gene McFadden; John Whitehead	Headbangaz Entertainment	4:09
11.	"I.B.S"	Giles	The Heatmakerz	3:32
12.	"Get Ya Gun"	Giles	Big Tyme	3:58
13.	"White Girls"	Giles	The Beat Firm	3:48
14.	"Girls, Cash, Cars"	Giles; Rick Wakeman	Stay Gettin' Productions	3:06
15.	"Do Ya Thing (Remix)"	Giles; Charles Stepney; Maurice White; Verdine White	Chad Hamilton; Ryan Press (co.)	2:54
16.	"Get'em Daddy (Remix)" (featuring Hell Rell, J.R. Writer, & Jim Jones)	Giles; Mohammed; Rusty Brito; Joseph Jones	I.N.F.O.	4:33
17.	"Voicemail (Interlude 2)"		Sancochito's Ent.	1:13
18.	"Something New" (featuring Hell Rell)	Giles; Mohammed; Spooner Oldham; Dan Penn	Boola	3:18
19.	"You Gotta Love It" (featuring Max B)	Giles; Charley Wingate; Jerry Goldsmith	I.N.F.O.	6:13
20.	"Love My Life" (featuring Nicole Wray)	Giles; Nicole Wray; Dugger	Jonathan Dugger	4:26
Total length:				70:14

Leftover tracks

- "It's Nothin" (featuring Juelz Santana)

Sample credits

- "Leave You Alone" contains a sample from "You're Gonna Make Me Cry", written by Deadric Malone, as recorded by Etta James.
- "We Make Change" contains excerpts from "Girl Don't Come", written by Chris Andrews, performed by Ronnie Dyson.
- "Triple Up" contains excerpts from "Shiftless, Shady, Jealous Kind of People", written by Kenneth Gamble, Leon Huff, Gene McFadden, and John Whitehead; performed by The O'Jays.
- "Girls, Cash, Cars" contains a sample from "Sir Lancelot and the Black Knight", written and performed by Rick Wakeman.
- "Do Ya Thing (Remix)" contains excerpts from "That's the Way of the World", written by Charles Stepney, Maurice White, and Verdine White; performed by Earth, Wind & Fire.
- "Something New" contains a sample of "I'm Your Puppet", written by Spooner Oldham and Dan Penn, as performed by James & Bobby Purify.
- "You Gotta Love It" contains interpolations from "Roxy Loses", written by Jerry Goldsmith.

== Personnel ==
Credits for Killa Season adapted from AllMusic.

- Eric "Ebo" Butler - engineer, mixing
- Karen Civil - A&R
- Tony Dawson - mastering
- Mike DeSalvo - assistant engineer
- Walik Goshorn - photography
- Phil Knott - photography
- Ralph Rivera - art direction
- Serge "Surgical" Tsai – engineer, mixing
- Jacob York - A&R

== Charts ==
=== Weekly charts ===
Chart (2006)	Peak position
US Billboard 200	2
US Top R&B/Hip-Hop Albums (Billboard)	1
US Top Rap Albums (Billboard)	1

=== Year-end charts ===
Chart (2006)	Position
US Top R&B/Hip-Hop Albums (Billboard)	52
US Top Rap Albums (Billboard)	25

== See also ==
- List of Billboard number-one R&B albums of 2006
- List of number-one rap albums of 2006 (U.S.)
