= Harlem: Diary of a Summer =

Studio album by Jim Jones
- Released: August 23, 2005
- Genre: East Coast hip hop
- Length: 56:49
- Label: Diplomats; Koch
- Producer: Antwan "Amadeus" Thompson; Pete Rock; Treblemakers; Zurc; Mayor; Knoxville; Zukhan Bey; Develop; Duke Productions; Jones Family Productions; Beat Firm; Hannon Lane; Jimmy the Greek; Shiest Bubz; Tuneheadz

Jim Jones chronology
On My Way to Church (2004)	Harlem: Diary of a Summer (2005)	Hustler's P.O.M.E. (Product of My Environment) (2006)

Singles from Harlem: Diary of a Summer
- 1. "Baby Girl" Released: July 2, 2005; 2. "Summer Wit Miami" Released: August 10, 2005; 3. "What You Been Drankin' On" Released: September 29, 2005

Harlem: Diary of a Summer is the second studio album by American rapper Jim Jones. The album was released on August 23, 2005 through Diplomat Records and Koch Records. The production on the album was handled by various producers including Pete Rock, Antwan "Amadeus" Thompson, Develop, and Tuneheadz including more. The album also features guest appearances by Juelz Santana, Trey Songz, P. Diddy, and Max B among others.

Harlem: Diary of a Summer was supported by three singles: "Baby Girl", "Summer Wit Miami", and "What You Been Drankin' On". The album received generally positive reviews from music critics and was a commercial success. It debuted at number five on the US Billboard 200 chart, selling 74,000 copies in its first week.

== Singles ==
Harlem: Diary of a Summer was supported by three singles. The first single, "Baby Girl" was released on July 2, 2005. The single features a guest appearance by Max B. The single didn't chart on the Billboard Hot 100, but it did manage to peak at number 58 on the US Hot R&B/Hip-Hop Singles & Tracks chart. The second single, "Summer Wit Miami" was released on August 10, 2005. The single features a guest appearance by Trey Songz. It peaked at number 78 on the Hot R&B/Hip-Hop Singles & Tracks. The third single, "What You Been Drankin' On" was released on September 29, 2005. The single features guest appearances by P. Diddy, Jha Jha and Paul Wall. It did not enter the Hot R&B/Hip-Hop Singles & Tracks.

== Critical reception ==
Professional ratings
Review scores
Source	Rating
AllMusic	3.5/5 stars
HipHopDX	3.5/5 stars
Pitchfork	8.1/10
RapReviews	7.5/10
Vibe	4/5 stars

Harlem: Diary of a Summer received generally positive reviews from music critics. AllMusic noted the difference between this album and Jones's previous, stating that "is a bit disarming in its hooky brightness" in comparison to Jones's first album, where he "built a darkly surreal world befitting a man whose name and religious references recall a maniacal 1970s mass murderer". The site referenced the title track and praised his approach, referring to "its breezy jazz hook and friendly spirit". Ultimately AllMusic gave the album 3 and a half stars. Albert M. of HipHopDX stated that the album takes the listener on what he calls "A tour of the hype and feel to be a balla ala' Harlem". He also felt that Jones played to his strengths and that "Unlike the last disk from Jim, this one has some bite and substance", giving the album a 3.5 of 5 rating.

A retrospective 2023 review from Pitchfork's Paul A. Thompson wrote that on the album, Jones's "childhood memories turned oddly urgent, its concessions to emerging styles bent back toward post-9/11 Manhattan. Through that process Jones, the least-discussed core member of the group he co-founded, emerges as an auteur of the ordinary, his unfussy writing and uncanny vocals rendering a world just a few degrees off from the one the rest of us inhabit".

== Commercial performance ==
Harlem: Diary of a Summer debuted at number five on the US Billboard 200 chart, selling 74,000 copies in its first week. This became Jones' first US top-ten debut and his highest charting album to date. The album also debuted at number one on the US Top R&B/Hip-Hop Albums and the US Independent Albums charts. This became Jones' first number one album on both charts, also spending two weeks at number one on the latter.

== Track listing ==
Harlem: Diary of a Summer track listing
No.	Title	Producer(s)	Length
1.	"My Diary" (featuring Denise Weeks)	Amadeus	4:27
2.	"Zeke (Interlude)"		1:15
3.	"G's Up" (featuring Max B)	Pete Rock	4:29
4.	"J.I.M.M.Y."	Treblemakers	3:44
5.	"What Is This"	Mayor; Zurc	3:27
6.	"Honey Dip" (featuring Juelz Santana, J.R. Writer, and Latif)	Zukhan Bey	4:24
7.	"Ride 'Wit Me" (featuring Juelz Santana)	Develop	2:40
8.	"Penitentiary Chances" (featuring Hell Rell)	Duke Productions; Jones Family Productions	3:25
9.	"We Just Ballin'" (featuring T.K.)	Beat Firm	3:22
10.	"What You Been Drankin On?" (featuring Jha Jha, P. Diddy, and Paul Wall)	Hannon Lane	3:38
11.	"Harlem"	Jimmy The Greek; Shiest Bub	3:51
12.	"Confront Ya Babe" (featuring Max B and Cardan)	Tuneheadz	4:48
13.	"Summer wit Miami" (featuring Trey Songz)	Knoxville	3:26
14.	"I'm in Love with a Thug" (featuring Denise Weeks)	Jones Family Productions	3:13
15.	"Tupac Joint" (featuring Hussein Fatal and 40 Cal)	Duke Productions; Jones Family Productions	3:28
16.	"Baby Girl" (featuring Max B)	Zukhan Bey	3:12
Total length:			56:49

Sample credits

- "My Diary" contains a sample of "Living Inside Your Love" as performed by Earl Klugh.
- "G's Up" contains a sample of "I Think You Need Love" as performed by Dionne Warwick.
- "Confront Ya Babe" contains a sample of "Journey to Transylvania" as performed by Alan Silvestri.
- "Summer wit Miami" contains a sample of "Between the Sheets" as performed by The Isley Brothers.
- "Tupac Joint" contains a sample of "Homies & Thuggs" as performed by Scarface and Master P.

== Charts ==
=== Weekly charts ===
Weekly chart performance for Harlem: Diary of a Summer
Chart (2005)	Peak position
US Billboard 200	5
US Independent Albums (Billboard)	1
US Top R&B/Hip-Hop Albums (Billboard)	1

=== Year-end charts ===
Year-end chart performance for Harlem: Diary of a Summer
Chart (2005)	Position
US Top R&B/Hip-Hop Albums (Billboard)	64
