= Devyn Rose =

American singer

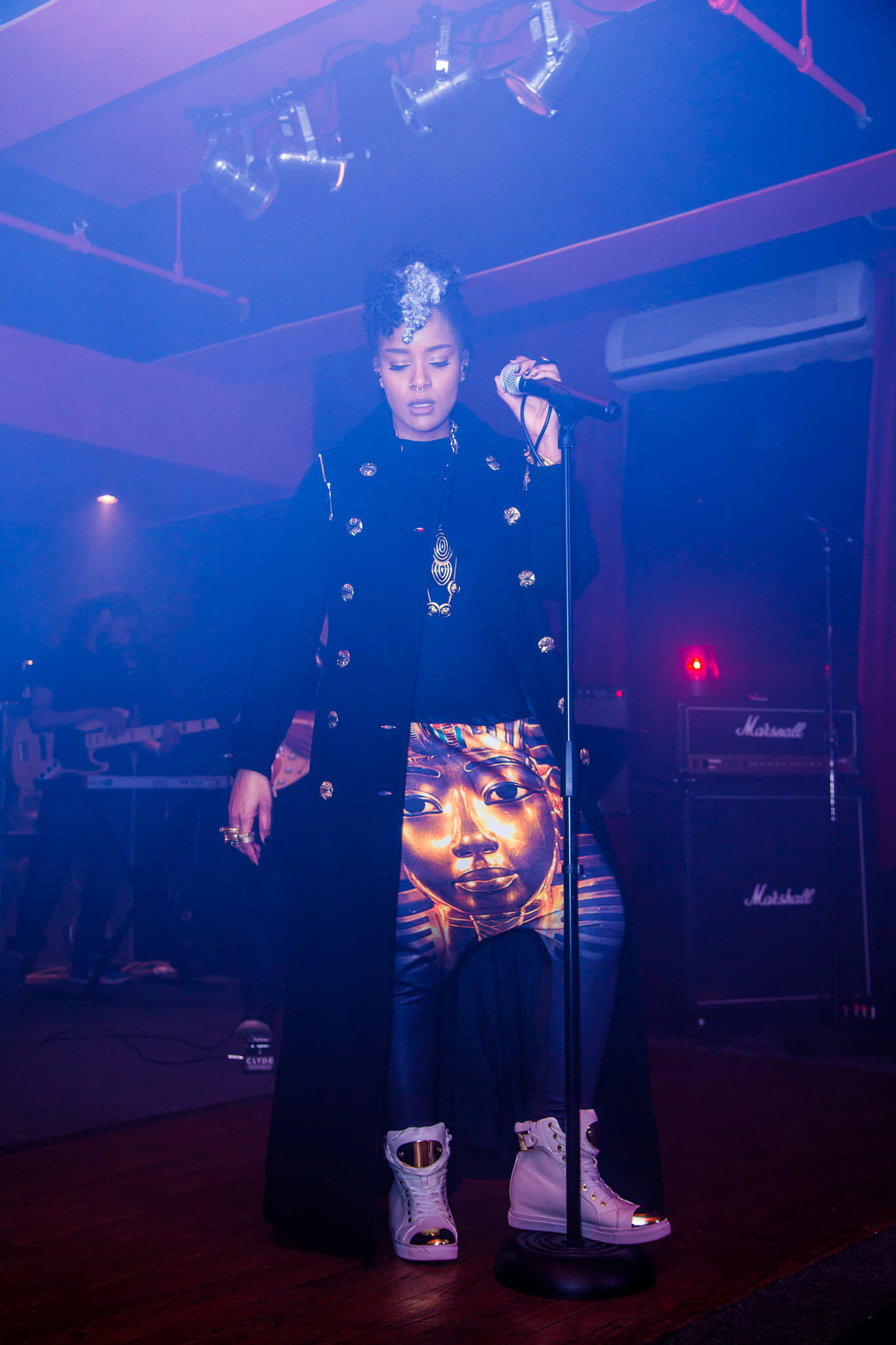

Background information
- Also known as: DEVYN+RO$E; MID+NIGHT
- Born: Tanya Dormevil; United States
- Origin: New York City, U.S.
- Genres: ILL+HOP
- Occupation: Singer-songwriter
- Instrument: Vocals
- Years active: 2021–present
- Website: www.devynrose.com

Tanya Dormevil, known professionally as Devyn Rose (stylized as DEVYN+RO$E), formerly known as Tanya T6, is an American singer-songwriter from New York City. She has released a number of singles, of which "Falling 4 U" reached No. 1 on the Billboard Biz Hot Singles Sales Chart. The latter was included on the EP Stellar, released in July 2015. In August 2018 she released the album Thir$ty.

== Early life and education ==
Devyn Rose's parents are from Haiti, but her early years were at Mount Vernon, New York. Her friends called her T6, because of her athletic physique. In an interview with Entrique Magazine, she claimed the name "Tanya T6" was given to her by Dame Grease. Rose mentioned she had a "strict upbringing" with little exposure to music. She discovered her interest in singing while performing (singing and dancing) in front of her siblings. At school, she was a part of her school choir. She moved to New York City when she was 16 and studied dancing at the Broadway Dance Center, New York. While she had no formal training in songwriting, she started writing poems and lyrics for her songs. Subsequently, she adopted the name DEVYN+RO$E as her stage name.

== Career ==
In 2008, Rose released her first mixtape, Move Over Paris Hilton, There's a New It Girl in Town. Her subsequent single titled "Get It Off" was featured across national and international radio channels. In 2008, she made an EP titled I am...D.E.V.Y.N. In March 2013, Maura Johnston described Rose's song "Who Am I" as "it's a hard listen at first, its swirling elements coming together in that odd way, but its charms eventually took me over." The May 2013 issue of HipHopLead.com reviewed Devyn Rose's work and commented that her songs were "a testimony of her struggle and her accomplishments [while] she sings within her range and makes it work to a tee."

Her song "Falling 4 U" peaked at No. 2 on the Indie Rotation charts in the first week of March 2014. In the week ending December 13, 2014, "Falling 4 U" debuted at No. 2 on the Billboard Biz Hot Singles Sales Chart. In February 2015 the song "Cops x The Jury", produced by Dame Grease, was released digitally.

The singles "Cops x The Jury" and "Falling 4 U" were also included on the five-track Stellar EP, released in July 2015. In 2016 she released the single "Robothot" produced by Lexi Banks.

== Discography ==
=== Mixtapes ===
- ”Move Over..” (2008)
- ”The Introduction” (2009)
- ”Reflections of Love” (2010)
- ”I’m Sorta Like A Big Deal” (2011)

=== LPs ===
- ”THIR$TY” (2018)
- ”$TREAM ME”(2020)

=== Extended plays ===
- Holidays at Home (2010)
- Pieces (2011)
- Devyn (2012)
- Want It All (2013)
- Stellar (2015)
- Killah Bad (2018)

=== Singles ===
- "Work My Body" (2008)
- "Swag Boy (2009)
- "Get It Off" (2009)
- "Silhouette" (2010)
- "Coming Home" (2011)
- "Fly Away" (2012)
- "Pieces" (2012)
- "Pay Me" (2013)
- "Dream" (2013)
- "Heartbeat" (2013)
- "Trouble" (2013)
- "Want It All" (2013)
- "Home for the Holidays" (2014)
- "Vine Dat" (2014)
- "Falling 4 U" (2014)
- "Cops x The Jury" (2015)
- "Robothot" (2016)
- "Mood Killah" (2016)
- "Cryptic" (2017)
- "Can't Complain" (2017)
- "Killah Bad" (2018)
- "Dracula" (2017)
- "THIR$TY" (2018)
