= In and Out of Love (Cheri Dennis album) =

Studio album by Cheri Dennis
- Released: November 13, 2007
- Length: 55:03
- Labels: Bad Boy; Atlantic

Singles from In and Out of Love
- 1. "I Love You" Released: May 1, 2006; 2. "Portrait of Love" Released: November 30, 2007; 3. "Pretend" Released: May 15, 2008

In and Out of Love is the debut album of American R&B singer Cheri Dennis, issued by Bad Boy and Atlantic Records. It was exclusively released digitally through the iTunes Store on November 13, 2007, with physical CDs and LPs made available on February 26, 2008. In and Out of Love debuted at number 74 on the US Billboard 200 and number eleven on the Top R&B/Hip-Hop Albums chart.

== Promotion ==
"Portrait of Love", the second of three singles released, reached number 55 on Billboard's Hot R&B/Hip-Hop Songs chart. It was originally entitled "Portrait" and featured only Yung Joc, but after the single was leaked, the track title was changed and Gorilla Zoe was added to the song. The first single "I Love You" peaked at number 18 on the Hot R&B/Hip-Hop Songs, and the third single "Pretend" featuring Maino peaked at number 116 on the charts. Promotion of third single then ceased due to her record label revoking budgets and refusing to grant funds for the album's future singles because of slow record sales.

== Critical reception ==
Professional ratings
Review scores
Source	Rating
About.com	3/5 stars
AllMusic	4/5 stars
USA Today	2.5/4 stars

In and Out of Love received mixed reviews from music critics upon its release. AllMusic editor Matt Rinaldi praised the album for its blend of "production sounds that range from 1990s hip-hop to contemporary neo-soul," while noting that Dennis brings "sweet and sensual vocals" to its 16 tracks. Billboard found that In and Out of Love "harks back to the early '90s," comparing its sound to the hip-hop soul style popularized by Mary J. Blige on songs such as "Real Love." Steve Jones from USA Today described the album as a "solid, but uneven, debut," praising its stronger, more upbeat material while observing that the slower ballads "generally lack emotional punch." Writing for SoulTracks, Chris Rizik criticized the album for lacking emotional depth, arguing that Dennis "lacks the passion to transcend the melody" and that the record "plays it too safe," ultimately failing to distinguish her from her contemporaries.

== Commercial performance ==
In and Out of Love debuted at number 74 on the US Billboard 200 and number 11 on the Top R&B/Hip-Hop Albums chart.

== Track listing ==
In and Out of Love track listing
No.	Title	Writer(s)	Producer(s)	Length
1.	"I Love You" (featuring Jim Jones & Yung Joc)	Corey "Latif" Williams; Jasiel Robinson; Jones; Ryan Leslie	Leslie	4:35
2.	"Intro"	Cheri Dennis; Harve Pierre; Sean Combs	Pierre	0:53
3.	"Portrait of Love" (featuring Yung Joc & Gorilla Zoe)	Alonzo Mathis; Brandon Howard; Corte Ellis; Robinson; Michelle Bell	Souldiggaz	3:52
4.	"Remind You"	Adonis Shropshire; Rodney Jerkins	Jerkins	3:53
5.	"All I Wanna Do"	Dennis; Delmar Arnaud; Jack Knight; Jeremy Graham; Ricardo Brown; Tupac Shakur	Yogi	3:55
6.	"Alright"	Jared Gosselin; Phillip White	Whitey	3:56
7.	"In and Out of Love (Interlude)"	Dennis; Pierre; Mario Winans	Winans	1:15
8.	"Dropping out of Love"	Shropshire; Bobby Caldwell; Dennis; Christopher Wallace; Clark Kent; Pierre; Hubert Barclay Eaves; James Williams; Winans; Combs; Shannon Lawrence	Pierre; Winans	4:18
9.	"Pretend"	C. Williams; Edward Rooks; Eric Hudson	Hudson	3:39
10.	"Spaced Out"	Amber Streeter; Giovanni James; Romeo IX	Romeo IX; James^{[A]}	3:39
11.	"Act Like You Know"	James Washington; Tim Mosley	Timbaland	2:33
12.	"Showdown"	Dennis; Carlos "Los" Coleman; Jarod B	Jarod B	4:21
13.	"Ooh Ooh"	Anders von Hofsten; Angela Hunte; Fredro Odesjo; Marco Rakascan; Shamora Crawford	Marco & Fredro; Crawford^{[A]}	4:04
14.	"Finally Made It (interlude)"	Dennis; Pierre; Jeremy Graham	Yogi	2:08
15.	"Caught Up"	Dennis; Alex North; Brandon Keith; Knight; Graham; Karen Anderson	Yogi; King	4:26
16.	"Waiting"	Dennis; Hunte; Antwan Thompson; Frank Collins	Thompson	3:37
Total length:				55:03

Japan bonus track
No.	Title	Writer(s)	Producer(s)	Length
17.	"Freak"	Christopher "Deep" Henderson; Combs; Steven Jordan; T. Baldursson; M. Bjoekland; J. Kurduletsch	Henderson; Combs; Stevie J	3:42
18.	"Ooh La La" (featuring G-Dep)	Leslie; Richard Frierson; David Haulsey	Leslie; Younglord^{[A]}	4:30

Notes

- ^{^[A]} denotes co-producer

Sample credits

- "All I Wanna Do" contains an interpolation of "Got My Mind Made Up" (1996) by 2Pac, Tha Dogg Pound, Method Man, & Redman.
- "Dropping Out of Love" contains elements of "Sky's the Limit" (1997) by The Notorious B.I.G. and 112, which in turn contains samples of Bobby Caldwell's "My Flame" and D. Train's "Keep On".
- "Waiting" contains a sample from "Forever" (1975) by British soul band Kokomo.

== Charts ==
Weekly chart performance for In and Out of Love
Chart (2007)	Peak position
US Billboard 200	74
US Top R&B/Hip-Hop Albums (Billboard)	11

== Release history ==
List of releases of In and Out of Love
Region	Date	Formats	Label
Various	November 13, 2007	digital download	Bad Boy; Atlantic
Various	February 26, 2008	CD; vinyl	Bad Boy; Atlantic
