= Baby Girl (Jim Jones song) =

Single by Jim Jones featuring Max B

from the album Harlem: Diary of a Summer
- Released: July 2, 2005
- Recorded: 2005
- Genre: Hip hop
- Length: 3:12
- Label: Diplomat, Koch
- Songwriters: Joseph Jones, Charly Wingate
- Producer: Zukhan-Bey

Jim Jones singles chronology
"Crunk Muzik" (2004)	"Baby Girl" (2005)	"Summer Wit Miami" (2005)

"Baby Girl" is a song by American hip hop recording artist Jim Jones, released on July 2, 2005 as the lead single from his second studio Harlem: Diary of a Summer (2005). The song, produced by Zukhan-Bey for Zukhan Music/BMI, features vocals from fellow Harlem-based rapper Max B.

== Music video ==
The music video was directed by Jim Jones and Andre Wilkins. The video features cameo appearances from Trey Songz and fellow Dipset member Juelz Santana. The second half of the video switches to "G's Up", also featuring Max B.

=== Controversy ===
This video was banned by the Canadian National Music Station due to Stop Snitchin' shirts in the video. Defending his decision to use the shirts in his video, Jim Jones explains, "I was not in any way trying to promote violence by having those t-shirts in my video. I was simply making a comment on using your integrity."

== Chart positions ==
Chart (2005)	Peak position
U.S. Billboard Hot R&B/Hip-Hop Songs	58
