= Ever Since U Left Me (I Went Deaf) =

2026 single by French Montana and Max B

Single by French Montana and Max B

from the album Coke Wave 3.5: Narcos
- Released: January 23, 2026
- Genre: East Coast hip-hop
- Length: 2:16
- Label: Coke Boys
- Songwriters: Karim Kharbouch; Charley Wingate; Johnny Goldstein; Harry Wayne Casey; Akil King
- Producers: Goldstein; Juko

French Montana singles chronology
"Metro Wave" (2026)	"Ever Since U Left Me (I Went Deaf)" (2026)

Max B singles chronology
"Metro Wave" (2026)	"Ever Since U Left Me (I Went Deaf)" (2026)	"I Want the Smoke" (2026)

Music video
- "Ever Since U Left Me (I Went Deaf)" on YouTube

"Ever Since U Left Me (I Went Deaf)" is a song by American rappers French Montana and Max B from their collaborative mixtape Coke Wave 3.5: Narcos. It was released as the mixtape's lead single on January 23, 2026. Produced by Johnny Goldstein and Juko, the song contains a sample of "That's the Way (I Like It)" by KC and the Sunshine Band. It is characterized by a New York hip-hop sound. The song has since been officially remixed twice; the "West Coast" remix features American singer Ty Dolla Sign and the "Big Bronx" remix features fellow American rapper Remy Ma. American rapper Lil' Kim released a freestyle remix on 10 July 2026 of the song to mixed reviews. This is her first music release in a year since the "Left Eye" remix in 2025.

== Critical reception ==
On The New York Times podcast Popcast, Jon Caramanica said of the song's sample, "It's an extremely low-hanging-fruit sample. It's a sort of sample that could have powered a classic Bad Boy record from the mid-to late '90s. It's the type of sample that could have powered a crossover drill hit of the early 2020s." He also commented that "even though this is a pretty centrist, conventional, sample-driven rap song it may only resonate in New York City."

Angel Diaz of Billboard had a favorable reaction to the sample and "bounce" of the song, describing them to be "perfect for one of those signature nights out in the city. The type of night that'll make you go deaf on a b—h. This is how you reintroduce Max B to the mainstream." DeeWeb of Hip Hop High Society, while reviewing the mixtape Coke Wave 3.5, wrote that the track is "likely on its way to becoming a club hit." Ben Tarki Moujahid of DimaTOP Magazine, praising French Montana's hook delivery, described the track as "the kind of song that works in the bedroom and on the dance floor, sometimes in the same night."

== Charts ==
=== Weekly charts ===
Weekly chart performance
Chart (2026)	Peak position
Belarus Airplay (TopHit)	106
Canada Hot 100 (Billboard)	96
Canada CHR/Top 40 (Billboard)	21
CIS Airplay (TopHit)	28
El Salvador Anglo Airplay (Monitor Latino)	9
Honduras Anglo Airplay (Monitor Latino)	7
Kazakhstan Airplay (TopHit)	23
Latvia Airplay (TopHit)	24
Lithuania Airplay (TopHit)	56
Moldova Airplay (TopHit)	128
Nicaragua Anglo Airplay (Monitor Latino)	6
Panama Anglo Airplay (Monitor Latino)	12
Russia Airplay (TopHit)	25
Turkey International Airplay (Radiomonitor Türkiye)	2
US Billboard Hot 100	82
US Hot R&B/Hip-Hop Songs (Billboard)	19
US Pop Airplay (Billboard)	25
US Rhythmic Airplay (Billboard)	1

=== Monthly charts ===
Monthly chart performance
Chart (2026)	Peak position
CIS Airplay (TopHit)	30
Kazakhstan Airplay (TopHit)	40
Lithuania Airplay (TopHit)	99
Russia Airplay (TopHit)	24

== Awards and Nominations ==
Organization			Result
BET Hip-Hop Awards	2026	Best Group	Nominated

Organization			Result
MTV Video Music Awards	2026	Best Collaboration	Nominated
