= Max B =

American rapper and originator of the wave movement in hip-hop

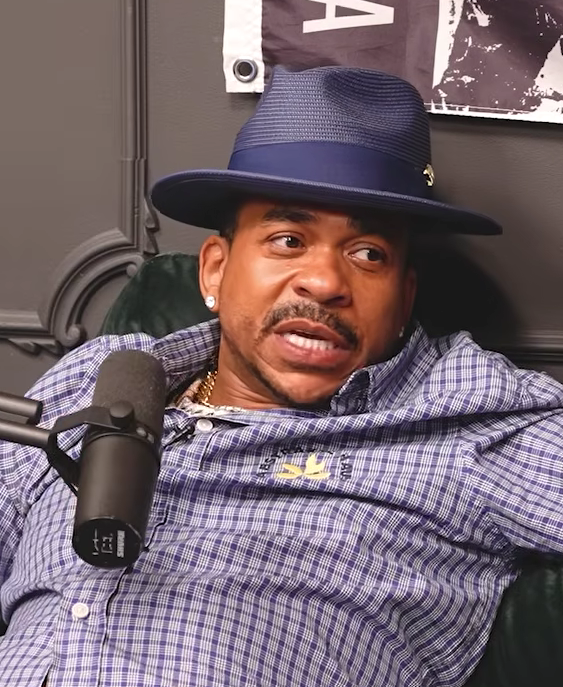
- Max B in 2026
- Born: Charley Wingate; May 21, 1978 (age 48); Harlem, New York City, U.S.
- Other names: Biggaveli; The Silver Surfer; Wavy Crockett
- Status: Released
- Criminal charges: Murder conspiracy and robbery
- Penalty: 8 years in prison (1997–2005); 20 years (with time served) (2009–2025)
- Musical career
- Genre: Hip-hop
- Occupations: Rapper; singer; songwriter
- Years active: 2005–present
- Labels: Gain Green; Phase One Network (current); Amalgam Digital; Cocaine City; BG; Asylum

Charley Wingate (born May 21, 1978), better known by his stage name Max B (short for Max Biggaveli), is an American rapper, singer, and songwriter from Harlem, New York. He is best known for his solo Public Domain and Million Dollar Baby series of mixtapes. He coined the term "wavy" as a slang in popular lexicon, originating the wave movement in hip-hop. Released from federal prison on November 9, 2025 after serving sixteen years, he returned to music and scored his first career number-one single with "Ever Since U Left Me (I Went Deaf)" with French Montana, which reached number one on Billboard Rhythmic Airplay and Mediabase Rhythmic Radio in 2026. He also appeared on "Minks in Miami" with Rick Ross and French Montana, which reached number one on Billboard Mainstream R&B/Hip-Hop Airplay, giving him two number-one records on two different Billboard charts in 2026.

He made his mixtape debut in 2006, and signed a recording deal with fellow Harlem-based rapper Jim Jones' label/group ByrdGang. Following a streak of financial and ethical grievances, Max B parted ways with Jones in 2008. The two became embroiled in a bitter feud which pitted Jones and his associates on one side, and Max B and his affiliates on the other. Max B is closely associated with producer Dame Grease, and fellow rapper French Montana where the two collaborated on the Coke Wave mixtape series.

In mid-2009, he was sentenced to 75 years in prison on conspiracy charges pertaining to armed robbery, kidnapping, aggravated assault and felony murder. He secured a 3-album deal with Amalgam Digital which published his debut album Vigilante Season in 2011. On September 16, 2016, it was announced that Max B took a 20-year plea bargain for aggravated manslaughter. He was released from prison on November 9, 2025.

== Early life ==
Max B was born Charley Wingate on May 21, 1978 and raised in the Abraham Lincoln housing projects in Harlem, New York City. His mother, Sharon Wingate, the eldest of eight siblings, had battled with substance abuse for most of her life and eventually served a year and a half in prison for her crack addiction. Charley was largely raised by his grandparents. According to his mother, his grandmother taught Charley her strong religious values from a young age. As a child, he was friends with future rapper and Dipset founder Cam'ron. He grew up with music in the household, and had sung in the Boys Choir of Harlem. Despite his grandmother's best efforts, Charley was heavily influenced by the streets, and at the age of 18, began serving a sentence for robbery in 1997. Wingate went on to serve 8 years in prison, before being released in 2005. Following his release, he immediately began pursuing a career in music, choosing the stage name Max B. The "B" being shorthand for Biggaveli, a portmanteau referencing The Notorious B.I.G. ("Biggie"), Jay Z ("Jigga") and Tupac Shakur ("Makaveli").

== Music career ==
In 2005, Max B appeared as a feature on various records, including "G's Up" and lead single "Baby Girl" off of Jones' sophomore album Harlem: Diary of a Summer released in August. He appeared as a feature on "You Gotta Love It" off of Cam'ron's Killa Season album released in May 2006, and released his debut mixtape Million Dollar Baby the same month. Max B collaborated on the ByrdGang mixtape M.O.B. (Members of ByrdGang) released on July 7, and made several feature appearances on Jones' mixtape The 7 Day Theory released on September 27.

In 2006, Max B became embroiled in legal trouble when he was arrested on September 29 in connection to a botched robbery turned homicide that occurred in Fort Lee, New Jersey, allegedly involving his "on-again off-again girlfriend" Gina Conway and step-brother Kevin Leerdem. While away, Max B had already recorded several feature appearances on Jim Jones' third album Hustler's P.O.M.E. which was released in November. In addition to writing for Jones on other tracks, most notably its lead single and Jones' highest-charting single to date "We Fly High" which was released on October 21.

Max B's second solo mixtape Public Domain: Million Dollar Baby Radio was released on November 2 while the rapper remained behind bars. Notable tracks off the record include "Deez My Streets" and "Dom Perignon" among others. Followed by his third mixtape Public Domain 2: Rise of the Silver Surfer released in December of that year. Notable tracks off the record include "Blow Me A Dub" and "De La Soul" among others. Both mixtapes were hosted by Connecticut-based veteran DJ Big Mike, whom Max would develop an extensive relationship with throughout his career.

After having spent 10 months imprisoned, Max B was released on July 11, 2007, on a $2 million bail. Short of funds, portion of Max's bond was raised by selling his publishing over to his label owned by Jim Jones. It would eventually go on to become one of many grievances and disputes Max would share with his former labelmate and head Jim Jones. Max B's fourth mixtape Public Domain: The Prequel was released later in the month following his release from prison. He appeared as a feature on Styles P's "Holiday" off of his third album released on December 4. Max B collaborated on the MOB2 (Members of ByrdGang 2) mixtape released on October 20, and had written for Jones' digital album which came out on February 19 the following year.

Exactly one month prior to Max's release, on June 11, his friend Stack Bundles had been killed in his neighborhood of Far Rockaway, Queens. In a 2009 interview before his trial, Max expressed his loss stating, "That was fucked up because the nigga Stacks was close to me, I ain't even gonna front. I was in jail at the time, so a nigga was sitting. A nigga learned to cope with that thing pretty well though, R.I.P. to Stacks. Shout out to my nigga, he played me all the joints he had. Man, that was my nigga."

=== 2008: Leaving ByrdGang and feuding with Jim Jones ===
By 2008, Max B had left ByrdGang and publicly distanced himself from the "Dipset" movement. He had begun concentrating on his own rap collective named Gain Greene which included members Al Pac, Mak Mustard and Scarlett O'Harlem. He began associating with South Bronx rapper French Montana, then best known as the founder/host of the "street DVD" series Cocaine City, and who shared a similarly bitter history with Jim Jones. The two collaborated on their first song together "Waavvyy" off of French's sophomore tape Live From Africa released on April 29. Max also developed a close relationship with Boston rappers Mall G and T.P., Connecticut rapper Hollywood Fergie, and G-Unit's Tony Yayo.

On March 1, Max B released his first solo project since his departure from ByrdGang, his fifth mixtape Million Dollar Baby 2. Notable tracks off the record include "Why You Do That" and "Sexy Love" among others. Hosted by New York-based Mexican-Belgian female DJ Lazy K, the two then released his sixth mixtape Million Dollar Baby 2.5 on June 7. Notable tracks off the record include "Won't Go Far" and "She Touched It In Miami".

Max B released his seventh mixtape Public Domain 3 on June 10, hosted by veteran DJ Whoo Kid. The record became a significant mark of Max's independence, including scathing references towards his former partner turned rival Jim Jones. Notable tracks off the record include "Picture Me Rolling", "Lip Sing", "Ready To Ride", and "Paperwork" featuring Al Pac.

On July 21, Max B released his eighth mixtape Wavie Crockett. Notable tracks off the record include "Gotta Have It" and "Takin' Pictures" among others. With the popularity of his mixtapes, he had embarked on his first tour to the West Coast earlier in the year. The fourth installation in his flagship "Public Domain" series, Domain Diego was released on July 28, with a significant portion of the record having been recorded in San Diego, California, during his trip. Notable tracks off the record include "Try Me" and "I'm So High" among others. On October 1, he released his tenth mixtape Goon Music 1.5: The Doomship. Notable tracks off the record include "Free Al Pac", "I Wasn't There" and "Cops Come Runnin".

=== Feud with Jim Jones ===
Following his departure from ByrdGang, Max B engaged in a bitter feud with Jim Jones alongside fellow rapper French Montana. According to interviews, French and Max shared a common group of friends and associates. However, due to French's existing problems with Jim Jones, and Max being signed to his ByrdGang at the time, the two had yet to collaborate. This would soon change as the two became embroiled in one of the more infamous street beefs in New York hip-hop.

According to Max B, his beef with Jones stems from his allegations he was forced into a contract which offered him inadequate pay and no recognition of his contributions which included writing hooks, verses and melodies for Jim Jones during their stint together. He also alleges he was paid $300 for live shows where Jones earned in the range of $10–15,000. In his infamous interview on The Come Up Vol. 18 (2008), he confirmed having delivered "10 albums" worth of material to Jones to fulfill the terms of his contract.

In the case of French Montana, his beef with Jim Jones had begun earlier. Albeit also attributed to Jones' disdain towards French for the infamous footage in Cocaine City Vol. 4 (2006), depicting Jones and his Dipset crew being beaten and driven-out during a brawl in Rucker Park, by the Brooklyn-based Junior MAFIA associated with the late Notorious BIG. According to French, his personal problems with Jones stems from his claims that Jones was publicly insinuating having a hand with the people responsible for a shooting targeting French. In a 2009 interview with VladTV, French claimed that Jones – by then well known for his numerous feuds and provocations – was using the late-2003 incident to increase his reputation in the streets.

By the time Max B left ByrdGang in 2008, Jim Jones had garnered a streak of feuds with rappers, ranging from Junior MAFIA to would-be Jay-Z affiliate Tru Life. Tru Life had already appeared in various interviews, including one on Cocaine City Vol. 8 (2007) showing off two Dipset chains he claimed to have snatched off of Jones. Max B's affiliation with French and their mutual beef with Jim Jones was a very public one – resulting in numerous back-and-forth "diss" videos, interviews, confrontations and accusations – which appeared on street DVDs such as Cocaine City, Smack, Come Up, Sub-0, as well as websites such as HipHopBeef.com and WorldStarHipHop.com which were just beginning to gain a foothold. The feud also involved Jim Jones affiliate Hell Rell, and at differing points of time various rappers from Dipset or ByrdGang close to Jones.

On February 5, 2009, Max B and French Montana would go on to release their debut collaborative mixtape Coke Wave, which included production from Dame Grease, Young Los and J. Cardim. The run up to which was marred by tension and confrontation between the feuding sides. Notable bits from the series of back-and-forth videos include French and Max B mocking Hell Rell's standing in relation to Jones, and Rell firing back; Max B's allegations of infidelity by Jones' wife Chrissy; Max B recalling an off-camera altercation with Jones in the street in late 2008; footage of French and Max's crew confronting Jones at his Manhattan studio followed by a standoff with police in November (Cocaine City Vol. 12); and an attempted reprisal against Max B by ByrdGang leading to a brawl at a club in Brooklyn in January 2009.

In June 2008, Max B had signed a three-album deal with independent record label Amalgam Digital. Soon after, however, they would be prevented by Jim Jones' legal team from making any commercial releases of Max's music. This would continue until May 2010, a year after Max B was sentenced, where in a lawsuit victory a New York City judge ruled that Jones no longer had rights over the now-incarcerated rapper's music. Thereby allowing Amalgam to release his debut album Vigilante Season. The project which was recorded in 2008, and originally intended to be released sometime after Public Domain 3, was finally released on March 22, 2011. Notable songs from Vigilante Season include "Money Make Me Feel Better", "Where Do I Go" and "Lord Is Tryna Tell Ya Something" among others.

=== 2009–2025: Incarceration and continued influence ===
Following the release of his eleventh mixtape Coke Wave on February 5, he released his twelfth mixtape Quarantine on February 21 later that month. The fifth installation in his flagship "Public Domain" series, notable tracks off Quarantine include "I Ain't Tryna", "All My Life", "Don't Love Hoes", and "DJ Saved My Life" featuring Mak Mustard.

On June 4, Max B was sentenced to 75 years in prison, found guilty on 9 of 11 counts in the case involving himself, Gina Conway and Kevin Leerdam. Based on the testimony of Conway, he was accused of being a conspirator in the event, and was deemed eligible for parole in 2042. Conway was sentenced to 18 years in prison, and Leerdam received a life sentence.

Following his verdict, his fourteenth mixtape Million Dollar Baby 3 was released on June 30. His fifteenth mixtape and sixth installment in his "Public Domain" series, PD6: Walking The Plank, was released on July 12. Notable tracks off the record include "Dead Solver", "Never Wanna Go Back", "Letter To Stack Bundles", and "What You Want From Me" featuring Beanie Sigel and French Montana. His collaborative mixtape Coke Wave 2 with French was released on November 3, 2009.

Albeit in prison since June 2009, Max B has been featured on various artists' records, utilizing preexisting recordings or through phoned-in verses and messages from prison. A collaborative mixtape titled Dopeman with fellow Gain Greene rapper Mak Mustard was released on April 4, 2010. A collaborative mixtape A Wave Called Yes with Amalgam labelmate Young Riot was released on May 26. The record contained two collaborative tracks featuring Curren$y who had signed to Amalgam in 2009, having had the opportunity to work with Max during his final months before his sentencing. In 2012, Isaiah Toothtaker released a collaborative mixtape called Toothy Wavy which featured phoned-in verses from Max B, and production by The Hood Internet. When Kanye West's album was scheduled to be named Waves, Max B (originator of the wave), expressed approval of the name change. He called in the Breakfast Club and said "It's all love. I appreciate it." In 2016, a phone conversation with French Montana was featured on the track "Siiiiiiiiilver Surffffeeeeer Intermission" from Kanye West's 7th studio album, The Life of Pablo. He dropped a song with French Montana called "Hold On" in 2019.

In 2023, during a recorded jail phone call, French Montana notified Max B that their 2013 song "Once in a While" had received a RIAA gold certification. This accolade was the first RIAA certication that Max B has received.

== Controversies ==
=== Allegations of blackballing ===
Together with his producers Dame Grease and Young Los, newfound partner French Montana, and mixtape DJ's Big Mike and Lazy K, Max B had garnered a sizeable underground movement that pushed his music online and throughout the North Eastern region. Particularly noteworthy since, throughout their stint Max B, SBG, and French would allege being "blackballed" by radio and media. In a September 25, 2008, video on WSHH, they would go on to accuse Jim Jones for using his influence to further dissuade labels and websites from covering the rappers.

As a response to being blackballed, the two would rely on grassroots and online methods of promotion. French Montana – who had a background in Cocaine City – and Max B, would utilize outlets such as street DVDs and hip-hop websites to promote themselves and their respective projects. Since the early-2000s, street DVDs had emerged as a lucrative underground medium providing a "behind the scenes" look into the business and politics of major and upcoming rappers. By the late 2000s, websites such as WSHH and others would take on the same spot; consequently, marking the decline of street DVDs as an outdated and non-lucrative format.

Another tactic was to release a flood of music/mixtapes. In 2008 alone, Max B had released over half a dozen mixtapes. The Coke Wave mixtape, and its sequel Coke Wave 2, were accompanied by DVD films which included music videos, in-studio footage, skits, and videos revolving around their beef with background commentary. Coke Wave 2, in addition to the Take A Look Into My Life DVD, which were released subsequent to Max B's sentencing, further included footage related to his trial and commentary on his legal situation. French would touch on the subject of having been blackballed in a number of interviews following his mainstream breakout. In a 2012 interview from prison, Max B touched on the subject noting,

I was completely blackballed, my songs on the radio. I couldn't help myself but I was always able to help French do what he wanted to do [...] if I had to blow trial, at least I know a n**ga out there holding it down [...] I'm talking to French; we communicate a couple times a week [...] he real wavy right now.

=== Felony murder charges ===
On September 22, 2006, Gina Conway, Max B's ex-girlfriend, met up with Max B and told him about Allan "Jay" Plowden, whom she had recently met, and Plowden's money. Max B formed a plan to rob Plowden, so he sent Kelvin Leerdam, his stepbrother, to rob Plowden, and he told Conway to go with Leerdam to the Holiday Inn in Fort Lee, New Jersey, where Plowden was staying, and help Leerdam with the robbery. Conway and Leerdam took a taxi the Fort Lee Holiday Inn. When Conway and Leerdam got to Plowden's hotel room, Conway knocked on the door, and Gisselle Nieves answered, saying Plowden was sleeping. Conway and Leerdam came into the room, and Leerdam held Nieves at gunpoint. Conway duct taped her. They searched the room for the money, but they didn't find it. Then, Conway woke Plowden up and duct taped him. Plowden was asked about the money, but he said it wasn't there. Then, Leerdam forced Plowden to call his partner, David Taylor, who was staying at the hotel with another woman, to come to the room to bring him the money. When Taylor arrived, he and Leerdam struggled over the gun, which discharged, and Taylor fell dead. Conway took $800 from Taylor's pockets, while Leerdam took a watch off of his wrist. Conway took Nieves' purse. The crew fled the scene, and Plowden alerted the hotel front desk of the murder. As police entered the room, Plowden was caught moving $30,000 out of the room. Plowden was later charged with money laundering and identity theft. On September 28, 2006, Conway was arrested in connection with the murder, and gave a statement to police implicating Max and Leerdam, who were then arrested and charged.

On January 9, 2007, Max B was remanded to Bergen County Jail in New Jersey on a $2 million bail. In January 2009, Conway pleaded guilty to manslaughter and armed robbery and agreed to testify against Max B and Leerdam, facing a maximum sentence of 18 years.

==== Conviction and appeal ====
On May 23, 2009, Max B and Kelvin Leerdam's trial began. On June 9, 2009, Max B and Leerdam were found guilty on 9 of 11 counts, including felony murder. On September 3, 2009, Max B was sentenced to 75 years in prison, and Leerdam was sentenced to life in prison plus 35 years. The following day, Conway was sentenced to 15 years. Max B's mother, Sharon Wingate, and fellow rap artist French Montana said he planned to appeal his conviction. On March 19, 2010, Max B was granted an appeal with a new trial and lawyer. In February 2012, rumors spread that Max's request for an appeal had been denied, but it was cleared up as an internet/blog/Twitter rumor. On August 30, 2012, Max's appeal was denied and he was set to remain in prison to finish his 75-year sentence.

His conviction was vacated in 2016, after a new legal team argued that his original trial lawyer had a conflict of interest in the case. His sentence was reduced to 20 years on September 16, 2016, after he pleaded guilty to aggravated manslaughter. He was released from prison on November 9, 2025.

== Return and comeback (2025–present) ==
On November 9, 2025, Max B was released from federal prison after serving sixteen years. He immediately returned to the studio with longtime collaborator French Montana.

On January 9, 2026, the two released Coke Wave 3.5: Narcos, followed by the lead single "Ever Since U Left Me (I Went Deaf)", which sampled KC and the Sunshine Band. The single reached number one on Billboard Rhythmic Airplay and number one on Mediabase Rhythmic Radio, marking Max B's first career number-one record. The song accumulated over 30 million streams on Spotify and over 220 million views on TikTok.

On March 20, 2026, Rick Ross released "Minks In Miami" featuring French Montana and Max B as the lead single from his upcoming album Set In Stone. The track reached number one on the Billboard Mainstream R&B/Hip-Hop Airplay chart, giving Max B two number-one chart positions on two different Billboard charts within less than a year of his release from prison.

On May 22, 2026, Max B and French Montana released their joint album Wave Gods 2: Cosmos Brothers through Coke Boys / Defiant Media / EMG, featuring guest appearances from Rick Ross and Ye. Max B also announced his solo album Public Domain 7: The First Purge (Patient Zero), a 24-track project, for release in 2026.

== Discography ==
=== Studio albums ===
Title	Album details	Peak chart positions		
Title	Album details	US	US R&B/HH	US Rap
Vigilante Season	Released: March 22, 2011; Label: Amalgam; Format: Digital download, streaming	200	44	22
Negro Spirituals	Released: November 19, 2021; Label: EMG, Phase One Network; Format: Digital download, streaming	—	—	—

=== Compilation albums ===
- Out on Bond: 2 Million Dollar Baby (2007)
- Max Payne (2008)
- Wave Music (2008)
- Bloomberg Series (2008)
- Goon Music 2.0www (2009) (with Dame Grease and French Montana)
- The Waviest (2010)
- Library of a Legend (2011) Volumes 1 to 24
- Return of the Wave (2013) (with various artists)
- Hook King (2014)
- The Best of Max B & Al Pac (2015) (with Al Pac)

=== Extended plays ===
- House Money (2019)
- Charly (2020)

=== Mixtapes ===
- Million Dollar Baby (2006)
- Public Domain: Million Dollar Baby Radio (2006)
- Public Domain: The Prequel (2007)
- Public Domain 2: Rise of the Silver Surfer (2007)
- Million Dollar Baby 2 (2008)
- Million Dollar Baby 2.5: Da Appetizer (2008)
- Public Domain 3: Domain Pain (2008)
- Wavie Crockett (2008)
- Domain Diego (2008)
- Goon Music 1.5: The Doomship (2008) (with Dame Grease)
- Coke Wave (2009) (with French Montana)
- Public Domain 5: Quarantine (2009)
- Public Domain 6: Walking the Plank (2009)
- Million Dollar Baby 3 (2009)
- Coke Wave 2 (2009) (with French Montana)
- Dopeman: Public Domain 6.5 (2010) (with Mak Mustard)
- A Wave Called Yes (2010) (with Young Riot)
- Toothy Wavy (2012) (with Isaiah Toothtaker)
- Public Domain 7: The First Purge (Patient Zero) (2025)
- Coke Wave 3.5: Narcos (with French Montana) (2026)
- Wave Gods 2: Cosmos Bros (with French Montana) (2026)
- A Night To Remember (with French Montana) (2026)
- Million Dollar Baby 4: More Bang 4 Your Buck (TBA)

=== Charted singles ===
==== As lead artist ====
Title	Year	Peak chart positions			Album
Title	Year	US	US R&B/HH	CAN	Album
"Ever Since U Left Me (I Went Deaf)" (with French Montana)	2026	83	19	100	Coke Wave 3.5: Narcos
"Minks in Miami" (with Rick Ross and French Montana)	2026	— (Note: "Minks in Miami" did not enter the Billboard Hot 100, but peaked at number 17 on the Bubbling Under Hot 100 Singles chart.)	41	—	Set in Stone

==== As featured artist ====
Title	Year	Peak chart positions						Certifications	Album
Title	Year	US	US R&B/HH	AUS	CAN	SWI	UK	Certifications	Album
"Baby Girl" (Jim Jones featuring Max B)	2005	—	58	—	—	—	—		Harlem: Diary of a Summer
"You Gotta Love It" (Cam'ron featuring Max B)	2006	—	104	—	—	—	—		Killa Season
"A Lie" (French Montana featuring The Weeknd and Max B)	2017	75	31	71	30	80	51	MC: Platinum	Jungle Rules

=== Guest appearances ===
- Funkmaster Flex – "We Be Gettin' Chips" from Car Show Tour (2005)
- Jim Jones – "G's Up" and "Baby Girl" from Harlem: Diary of a Summer (2005)
- Jim Jones – "Intro", "So Harlem", "Bright Lights, Big City", "Pin the Tail", "Love of My Life", "Don't Forget About Me", and "Concrete Jungle" from Hustler's P.O.M.E. (Product of My Environment) (2006)
- Cam'ron – "You Gotta Love It" from Killa Season (2006)
- Styles P – "Holiday" from Super Gangster (Extraordinary Gentleman) (2007)
- Pete Rock – "We Roll" from NY's Finest (2008)
- Kurious – "Back from Up Under" from II (2009)
- Curren$y – "Living the Life" from Jet Files (2009)
- Harvey Stripes – "Paid" (2009)
- The Jacka – "Look Me in My Eyes" from The Sentence (2012)
- French Montana – "Once in a While" and "Hey My Guy" from Excuse My French (2013)
- Cold World – "Outro" from How the Gods Chill (2014)
- Ateyaba – "Max B" (2013)
- Kanye West – "Siiiiiiiiilver Surffffeeeeer Intermission" from The Life of Pablo (2016)
- French Montana – "Chinx & Max/Paid For" from MC4 (2016)
- French Montana – "A Lie" from Jungle Rules (also featuring The Weeknd) (2017)
- Jay Critch - "Still Wavy" from Jugg Season (2023)
- Wiz Khalifa - "Max B Interlude" from Kush + Orange Juice 2 (2025)
- Wiz Khalifa - "Back Against The Wall" from Khaotic (also featuring RMR) (2026)
