= Hustler's P.O.M.E. (Product of My Environment) =

Studio album by Jim Jones
- Released: November 7, 2006
- Recorded: 2005–06
- Genre: Hip hop
- Length: 76:18
- Label: Diplomats; Koch
- Producer: Jim Jones; Cam'ron; Chink Santana; Big K.O.; Jim Bond; The Runners; Critical Child; Zukhan Bey; Street Scott; TAGMG; Majik; Mercury; Joe Black; Noyz

Jim Jones chronology
Harlem: Diary of a Summer (2005)	Hustler's P.O.M.E. (Product of My Environment) (2006)	Pray IV Reign (2009)

Singles from Hustler's P.O.M.E. (Product of My Environment)
- 1. "We Fly High" Released: October 21, 2006; 2. "Emotionless" Released: March 21, 2007

Professional ratings
Review scores
Source	Rating
AllMusic	3.5/5 stars
AllHipHop	3.5/5 stars
HipHopDX	1.5/5 stars
RapReviews	6.5/10 stars
Stylus Magazine	B−

Hustler's P.O.M.E. (Product of My Environment) is the third studio album by American rapper Jim Jones. The album was released in the United States on November 7, 2006 under Diplomat Records and Koch Records . The album features guest appearances by Cam'ron, Juelz Santana, Hell Rell, Jha Jha, Lil Wayne, Stack Bundles, Max B and R&B singer Rell.

The album's first single, "We Fly High", was released October 21, 2006. The single reached number five on the Billboard Hot 100, making it Jones' highest charting single to date. Another single, "Emotionless", was released on March 21, 2007. Koch Records re-released an expanded edition of the album on August 28, 2007, featuring previously unreleased tracks such as "Lookin' at the Game", which features Stack Bundles.

== Commercial performance ==
The album debuted at number 6 on the Billboard 200, with first week sales of 106,000 copies in the United States.

== Track listing ==
No.	Title	Writer(s)	Producer(s)	Length
1.	"Intro" (featuring Max B)	Joseph Jones; Charly Wingate; Kareem Denis	Big K.O.	5:24
2.	"So Harlem" (featuring Max B)	J. Jones; Wingate; Andre Parker	Chink Santana	5:03
3.	"Bright Lights, Big City" (featuring Max B)	J. Jones; Wingate; James Llonch	Jim Bond	4:16
4.	"Emotionless" (featuring Juelz Santana)	J. Jones; LaRon James; Parker	Chink Santana	4:45
5.	"Reppin' Time"	J. Jones; Andrew Harr; Jermaine Jackson	The Runners	4:24
6.	"Pin the Tail" (featuring Cam'ron, Juelz Santana, and Max B)	J. Jones; Cameron Giles; James; Wingate; Eben Jones	Critical Child	4:57
7.	"Get It Poppin'" (featuring Jha Jha and Princess)	J. Jones; Natoya Handy; Parker	Chink Santana	4:00
8.	"Mr. Cool"	Vince Willis		0:09
9.	"We Fly High"	J. Jones; Zukhan Bey	Zukhan	3:56
10.	"Voicemail Skit"	D. Jones		0:50
11.	"Love of My Life" (featuring Max B)	J. Jones; Wingate; Todd Scott	H.O.T. Productions	3:27
12.	"Voicemail Skit 2"	D. Jones		0:45
13.	"Weather Man" (featuring Lil Wayne and Stack Bundles)	J. Jones; Dwayne Carter; Rayquon Elliott; Quinton Johnson	Majik	4:42
14.	"Don't Push Me Away" (featuring Rell)	J. Jones; Gerrell Gaddis	Mercury	4:50
15.	"Pour Wax" (featuring Hell Rell)	J. Jones; Durrell Mohammad	Jim Jones	4:20
16.	"Freekey Zekey Skit"	Ezekiel Jiles; Karen Civil	Karen Civil	2:01
17.	"Don't Forget About Me" (featuring Max B)	J. Jones; Wingate; Joe Wharton; K. Griffen	Joe Black; Noyz	4:48
18.	"I Know" (featuring Chink Santana)	J. Jones; Parker	Chink Santana	4:59
19.	"My Life"	J. Jones	Chink Santana	2:55
20.	"Concrete Jungle" (featuring Max B, Rell, Dr. Ben Chavis, and NOE)	J. Jones; Wingate; Gaddis; Duane Bridgeford; Benjamin Chavis	Chink Santana	5:55

== Charts ==
=== Weekly charts ===
Chart (2006)	Peak position
US Billboard 200	6
US Top R&B/Hip-Hop Albums (Billboard)	1
US Independent Albums (Billboard)	1

=== Year-end charts ===
Chart (2007)	Position
US Billboard 200	194
US Top R&B/Hip-Hop Albums (Billboard)	49
