= Memphis Bleek discography =

Hip hop recording artist discography

- Studio albums: 5
- Singles: 17
- Music videos: 15
- Mixtapes: 12

The discography of American rapper Memphis Bleek consists of five studio albums, twelve mixtapes, seventeen singles (including four as a featured artist) and fifteen music videos. An early signing to rapper Jay-Z's record label Roc-A-Fella Records, Bleek appeared on several of Jay-Z's early songs, and collaborated with him on the single "It's Alright" from the soundtrack to the film Streets Is Watching, which peaked at number 61 on the US Billboard Hot 100. Bleek went on to release his debut album, Coming of Age, in 1999, which contained the singles "Memphis Bleek Is...", "My Hood to Your Hood" and "What You Think of That".

After collaborating with Jay-Z on the singles "Hey Papi" and "Change the Game", Bleek's second album, The Understanding, was released on December 5, 2000. The album featured the single "Is That Your Chick (The Lost Verses)", a collaboration with Jay-Z and fellow rappers Missy Elliott and Twista, which achieved chart success in the United States, peaking at number 68 on the Billboard Hot 100, number 18 on the US Hot R&B/Hip-Hop Songs chart and number seven on the US Hot Rap Singles chart. The album also included the singles "My Mind Right" and "Do My...". Both Coming of Age and The Understanding were certified gold by the Recording Industry Association of America (RIAA).

Bleek released his third album, M.A.D.E., on December 16, 2003, which featured the singles "Round Here" and "Need Me In Your Life"; the former peaked at number 53 on the Hot R&B/Hip-Hop Songs chart. His fourth album, 534, peaked at number 11 on the Billboard 200, number three on the US Top R&B/Hip-Hop Albums and number one on the US Top Rap Albums chart following its release on May 17, 2005. 534 contained the singles "Like That" featuring Swizz Beatz, which peaked at number 47 on the Hot R&B/Hip-Hop Songs chart and number 22 on the Hot Rap Songs chart, and "Dear Summer".

== Albums ==
=== Studio albums ===
List of studio albums, with selected chart positions, sales figures and certifications
Title	Album details	Peak chart positions			Sales	Certifications
Title	Album details	US	US R&B	US Rap	Sales	Certifications
Coming of Age	Released: August 3, 1999; Label: Roc-A-Fella, Def Jam; Format: CD, LP, cassette, digital download	7	1	1	US: 436,000	RIAA: Gold
The Understanding	Released: December 5, 2000; Label: Get Low, Roc-A-Fella, Def Jam; Format: CD, LP, cassette, digital download	16	1	1	US: 833,000	RIAA: Gold
M.A.D.E.	Released: December 16, 2003; Label: Get Low, Roc-A-Fella, Def Jam; Format: CD, LP, cassette, digital download	35	5	1	US: 419,000	
534	Released: May 17, 2005; Label: Get Low, Roc-A-Fella, Def Jam; Format: CD, LP, digital download	11	3	1	US: 164,000	
Apt 3D	Released: June 20, 2025; Label: Roc Nation, Warehouse; Format: Digital download	—	—	—		

== Mixtapes ==
List of mixtapes, with selected information
Title	Mixtape details
Bed Stuy Do or Die (with Papoose)	Released: 2005; Label: Self-released; Format: Digital download
ImI: The Mixtape Vol.1	Released: 2006; Label: Self-released; Format: Digital download
Feed the Streets	Released: 2006; Label: Self-released; Format: Digital download
Heir to the Throne	Released: 2007; Label: Self-released; Format: Digital download
Feed the Streets 2	Released: November 29, 2007; Label: Self-released; Format: Digital download
Feed the Streets 3	Released: March 30, 2008; Label: Self-released; Format: Digital download
Eat Off the Land	Released: 2008; Label: Self-released; Format: Digital download
Feed the Streets 4	Released: February 25, 2009; Label: Self-released; Format: Digital download
Signed & Sealed	Released: July 10, 2009; Label: Self-released; Format: Digital download
The Return	Released: June 29, 2010; Label: Self-released; Format: Digital download
Feed the Streets: Free Food Part 1	Released: September 20, 2010; Label: Self-released; Format: Digital download
Kush Vol 1	Released: May 13, 2011; Label: Self-released; Format: Digital download
The Movement	Released: April 10, 2012; Label: Self-released; Format: Digital download
Kush Vol 2	Released: June 4, 2012; Label: Self-released; Format: Digital download
The Movement 2	Released: March 21, 2014; Label: Self-released; Format: Digital download

== Singles ==
=== As lead artist ===
List of singles, with selected chart positions, showing year released and album name
Title	Year	Peak chart positions				Album
Title	Year	US	US R&B	US Rap	UK	Album
"It's Alright" (with Jay-Z)	1998	61	32	9	—	Streets Is Watching (soundtrack) / Vol. 2... Hard Knock Life
"Memphis Bleek Is..."	1999	—	93	33	—	Coming of Age
"My Hood to Your Hood" (featuring Beanie Sigel)	1999	—	—	—	—	Coming of Age
"What You Think of That" (featuring Jay-Z)	1999	—	—^{[A]}	49	58	Coming of Age
"My Mind Right" (Remix) [featuring Jay-Z, H. Money Bags & Beanie Sigel]	2000	—	85	—	—	The Understanding
"Is That Your Chick (The Lost Verses)" (featuring Jay-Z, Twista and Missy Elliott)	2000	68	18	7	—	The Understanding
"Do My..." (featuring Jay-Z)	2001	—	68	24	—	The Understanding
"Round Here" (featuring Trick Daddy and T.I.)	2003	—	53	—	—	M.A.D.E.
"Like That"	2005	—^{[B]}	47	22	—	534
"Infatuated" (featuring Boxie)	2005	—	—	—	—	534
"Dear Summer" (featuring Jay-Z)	2005	—^{[C]}	30	—	—	534
"Still Ill"	2010	—	—	—	—	The Process
"—" denotes a recording that did not chart or was not released in that territory.

=== As featured artist ===
List of singles, with selected chart positions, showing year released and album name
Title	Year	Peak chart positions			Album
Title	Year	US	US R&B	US Rap	Album
"Money, Cash, Hoes" (Mo Money Remix) (Jay-Z with Beanie Sigel and Memphis Bleek)	1999	—	—	—	The Corruptor (soundtrack)
"Holla Holla" (Remix) (The Murderers featuring Memphis Bleek, Busta Rhymes and Jay-Z)	2000	—	—	—	Irv Gotti Presents: The Murderers
"Hey Papi" (Jay-Z with Amil and Memphis Bleek)	2000	76	16	12	Nutty Professor II: The Klumps (soundtrack)
"4 da Fam" (Amil featuring Jay-Z, Memphis Bleek and Beanie Sigel)	2000	—	99	29	All Money Is Legal
"Change the Game" (Jay-Z featuring Beanie Sigel and Memphis Bleek)	2001	86	29	10	The Dynasty: Roc La Familia
"Good Life" (Sparkle featuring Memphis Bleek)	2001	—	—^{[D]}	—	Told You So
"Cash, Money, Cars, Clothes" (Ruff Endz featuring Memphis Bleek)	2001	—	69	—	Someone to Love You
"Like That" (Just Blaze featuring Freeway and Memphis Bleek)	2003	—	—	—	NBA Live 2003 OST
"Sigue Ahí" (Héctor Bambino featuring Zion, De la Ghetto and Memphis Bleek)	2006	—	—	—	Los Rompe Discotekas
"—" denotes a recording that did not chart.

== Other charted songs ==
List of singles, with selected chart positions, showing year released and album name
Title	Year	Peak chart positions	Album
Title	Year	US R&B	Album
"Parking Lot Pimpin'" (Jay-Z featuring Beanie Sigel and Memphis Bleek)	2000	—^{[E]}	The Dynasty: Roc La Familia
"The ROC (Just Fire)" (Cam'ron featuring Beanie Sigel and Memphis Bleek)	2002	77	Come Home with Me

== Guest appearances ==
List of non-single guest appearances, with other performing artists, showing year released and album name
Title	Year	Other performer(s)	Album
"Coming of Age"	1996	Jay-Z	Reasonable Doubt
"Can I Live II" {Bonus Track}	1996	Jay-Z	Reasonable Doubt
"Celebration"	1998	Jay-Z, Sauce Money, Wais	Streets Is Watching (soundtrack)
"From Marcy to Hollywood"	1998	Jay-Z, Sauce Money	The Players Club (soundtrack)
"What the Game Made Me"	1998	Jay-Z, Sauce Money	I Got the Hook-Up (soundtrack)
"Hand It Down (Intro)"	1998	Jay-Z	Vol. 2... Hard Knock Life
"Coming of Age (Da Sequel)"	1998	Jay-Z	Vol. 2... Hard Knock Life
"Crew Love"	1998	Jay-Z, Beanie Sigel	Belly (soundtrack)
"Thugged Out Shit"	1998	DJ Clue?, Jay-Z, Beanie Sigel	The Professional
"4-5-6"	1999	Foxy Brown, Beanie Sigel	Chyna Doll
"Murda 4 Life"	1999	Ja Rule	Venni Vetti Vecci
"Wheredapaperat?"	1999	Cha Cha, Ja Rule, Black Child, Lo-Down, Bareda	Dear Diary
"Live Life 2 the Fullest"	1999	—N/a	Thicker than Water (soundtrack)
"Young Gunz"	1999	Choclair	Ice Cold
"Hold It Down 4 Y'all"	1999	Cover	12"
"Immobiliarie"	1999	Council, Big Jaz	12"
"I Want It All" (Remix)	1999	Warren G, Drag-On, Tikki Diamond	I Want It All
"For My Thugs"	1999	Funkmaster Flex, Jay-Z, Beanie Sigel, Amil	The Tunnel
"Pop 4 Roc"	1999	Jay-Z, Amil, Beanie Sigel	Vol. 3... Life and Times of S. Carter
"Who Want What"	2000	Beanie Sigel	The Truth
"What We Do"	2000	Sauce Money	Middle Finger U
"There's Nothing Better!"	2000	Beanie Sigel	Bait (soundtrack)
"My Mind Right"	2000	DJ Clue	Backstage: Music Inspired by the Film
"Crime Life"	2000	DJ Clue, Lil' Cease, Ja Rule	Backstage: Music Inspired by the Film
"This House"	2000	LaTanya	LaTanya
"Get Your Mind Right Mami"	2000	Jay-Z, Snoop Dogg	The Dynasty: Roc La Familia
"You, Me, Him, and Her"	2000	Jay-Z, Beanie Sigel, Amil	The Dynasty: Roc La Familia
"Parking Lot Pimpin'"	2000	Jay-Z, Beanie Sigel	The Dynasty: Roc La Familia
"Holla"	2000	Jay-Z	The Dynasty: Roc La Familia
"1-900-Hustler"	2000	Jay-Z, Beanie Sigel, Freeway	The Dynasty: Roc La Familia
"The R.O.C."	2000	Jay-Z, Beanie Sigel	The Dynasty: Roc La Familia
"Change the Game" (Remix)	2001	DJ Clue?, Jay-Z, Tha Dogg Pound, Beanie Sigel	The Professional 2
"M.A.R.C.Y."	2001	DJ Clue?, Geda K	The Professional 2
"So What You Saying"	2001	Beanie Sigel	The Reason
"123"	2001	—N/a	Exit Wounds (soundtrack)
"We Are"	2001	Funkmaster Flex, Geda K	Violator: The Album, V2.0
"The ROC (Just Fire)"	2002	Cam'ron, Beanie Sigel	Come Home with Me
"Roc the Mic" (Remix)	2002	Nelly, Beanie Sigel, Freeway, Murphey Lee	Nellyville
"1,2 Y'All"	2002	—N/a	Paid in Full (soundtrack) / M.A.D.E.
"As One"	2002	Jay-Z, Beanie Sigel, Freeway, Young Gunz, Peedi Crack, Sparks, Rell	The Blueprint 2: The Gift & The Curse
"Leave Her Alone"	2003	Nate Dogg, Freeway, Young Chris	Nate Dogg / Honey (soundtrack)
"Art & Life (Chi-Roc)"	2004	Twista, Young Chris, Freeway	Kamikaze
"Hands on the Pump"	2004	DJ Kayslay, Sauce Money, The Game	The Streetsweeper, Vol. 2
"We Got 'Em Goin'"	2004	Jay-Z, R. Kelly	Unfinished Business
"We Still Here"	2005	Young Gunz	Brothers from Another
"Brooklyn in My Mind"	2007	9th Wonder, Mos Def, Jean Grae	The Dream Merchant Vol. 2
"Ryders (Da Ville to da Stuy)"	2007	Saigon	The Moral of the Story
"Top of da World"	2011	Smif-N-Wessun, Pete Rock	Monumental
"Fuck Niggas Gone Do"	2012	Chase Fetti	Blvck Scvle
"Roc Reloaded"	2012	Freeway, Young Chris, Neef Buck, Peedi Crack	Black Santa
"Lyrically Untouchable" (Remix)	2013	Aspect, Mickey Factz, Freeway	—N/a
"Get Lifted"	2014	DJ Kay Slay, Young Chris, Murda Mook, T-Rex	The Last Hip Hop Disciple
"Selling Smoke"	2024	Smoke DZA	Kushedgod Bitch
"Rocafella Chain"	2024	Grafh, 38 Spesh, Roc Fam	God's Tiiming

== Music videos ==
List of music videos, with directors, showing year released
Title	Year	Director(s)
"It's Alright" (with Jay-Z)	1998	—N/a
"Memphis Bleek Is..."	1999	Darren Grant
"What You Think of That" (featuring Jay-Z)	1999	—N/a
"My Mind Right"	2000	Nzingha Stewart
"Is That Your Chick (The Lost Verses)" (featuring Jay-Z, Twista and Missy Elliott)	2000	Jeremy Rall
"Do My..." (featuring Jay-Z)	2001	Dave Meyers
"Round Here" (featuring Trick Daddy and T.I.)	2003	Bernard Gourley, Memphis Bleek
"Like That" (featuring Swizz Beatz)	2005	R. Malcolm Jones

=== As featured performer ===
List of music videos, with directors, showing year released
Title	Year	Director(s)
"More Money, More Cash, More Hoes" (Jay-Z featuring DMX, Beanie Sigel and Memphis Bleek)	1999	Malik Sayeed
"Murda 4 Life" (Ja Rule featuring Memphis Bleek)	1999	Hype Williams
"Holla Holla (Remix)" ((The Murderers featuring Memphis Bleek, Busta Rhymes & Jay-Z))	2000	`?
"4 da Fam" (Amil featuring Jay-Z, Memphis Bleek and Beanie Sigel)	2000	Nick Quested
"Hey Papi" (Jay-Z featuring Amil and Memphis Bleek)	2000	Hype Williams
"Change the Game" (Jay-Z featuring Memphis Bleek and Amil)	2001	Dave Meyers
"Cash, Money, Cars, Clothes" (Ruff Endz featuring Memphis Bleek)	2001	Simon Brand
"Let's Go" (Just Blaze featuring Freeway & Memphis Bleek)	2003	`?
"Sigue Ahi" (Hector Bambino featuring Zion & Memphis Bleek)	2006	

== Notes ==
- A "What You Think of That" did not enter the Hot R&B/Hip-Hop Songs chart, but peaked at number 9 on the Bubbling Under R&B/Hip-Hop Singles chart, which acts as a 25-song extension to the Hot R&B/Hip-Hop Songs chart.
- B "Like That" did not enter the Billboard Hot 100, but peaked at number 13 on the Bubbling Under Hot 100 Singles chart, which acts as a 25-song extension to the Hot 100.
- C "Dear Summer" did not enter the Billboard Hot 100, but peaked at number 16 on the Bubbling Under Hot 100 Singles chart, which acts as a 25-song extension to the Hot 100.
- D "Good Life" did not enter the Hot R&B/Hip-Hop Songs chart, but peaked at number 13 on the Bubbling Under R&B/Hip-Hop Singles chart, which acts as a 25-song extension to the Hot R&B/Hip-Hop Songs chart.
- E "Parking Lot Pimpin'" did not enter the Hot R&B/Hip-Hop Songs chart, but peaked at number 13 on the Bubbling Under R&B/Hip-Hop Singles chart, which acts as a 25-song extension to the Hot R&B/Hip-Hop Songs chart.
