= Jay-Z singles discography =

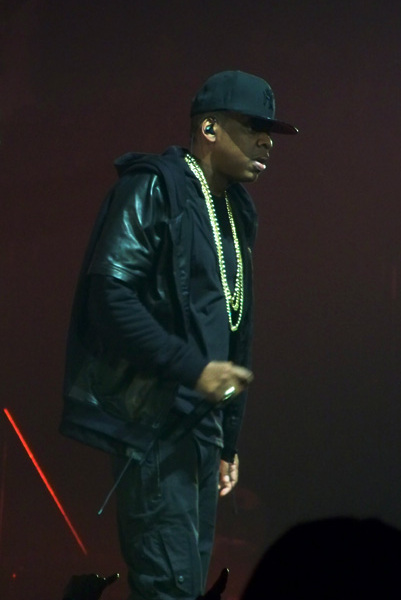
- Jay-Z performing in 2011
- Singles: 119
- Promotional singles: 14

The American rapper Jay-Z has released 68 singles as a lead artist, 51 singles as a featured artist, and 14 promotional singles. "Can't Knock the Hustle" was the rapper's breakout hit, serving as lead single for his debut studio album, Reasonable Doubt (1996). During 1997, Jay-Z saw continued success with his singles "Sunshine" (featuring Foxy Brown and Babyface), which peaked at number 25 on the UK singles chart, and "Wishing on a Star", which peaked at number 13. "The City Is Mine" (featuring Blackstreet) was the most successful single of his second album, In My Lifetime, Vol. 1 (1997), which peaked at number three on the US Billboard 200 and received positive reviews from critics. In 1998, he released the singles "Can I Get A..." (featuring Ja Rule and Amil) and "Hard Knock Life (Ghetto Anthem)", which peaked at numbers 19 and 15 on the US Billboard Hot 100, respectively. Both preceded his third album, Vol. 2... Hard Knock Life (1998), and led it to debut atop the Billboard 200. His fourth album, Vol. 3... Life and Times of S. Carter (1999), became his second album to do so, and spawned the Billboard Hot 100-top 40 singles "Jigga My Nigga" and "Big Pimpin'" (featuring UGK); the latter received platinum certification by the RIAA.

His fifth album, The Dynasty: Roc La Familia (2000), began production as a compilation album for his then-expanding record label, Roc-A-Fella Records, but ultimately served to showcase its signees. Selling 500,000 copies in its first week, it also received double platinum certification by the RIAA and was supported by the pop-oriented single, "I Just Wanna Love U (Give It 2 Me)" (featuring Pharrell), which peaked at number 11 on the Billboard Hot 100 and became his first to reach number one on the R&B/Hip-Hop Songs chart. His sixth album, The Blueprint (2001), was met with universal acclaim and the sold 400,000 copies in its first week, becoming his third consecutive project to debut atop the Billboard 200; it spawned his first Billboard Hot 100-top ten single, "Izzo (H.O.V.A.)" and was selected by the Library of Congress for preservation in the United States National Recording Registry. In 2002, he released a collaborative album with R. Kelly titled The Best of Both Worlds, as well as a direct sequel to The Blueprint with the double album The Blueprint 2: The Gift & The Curse. Both witnessed a slight critical decline due to further commercial-orientation, but debuted at numbers two and one on the Billboard 200, respectively; the latter spawned his second Billboard Hot 100-top ten single, "Excuse Me Miss" (featuring Pharrell), as well as his first to peak within the chart's top five, "'03 Bonnie & Clyde" (featuring Beyoncé). The Black Album was released and had three hit singles, two of which were top ten. It won a Grammy for "99 Problems". Even though he said The Black Album would be his last album he released a collaboration EP with Linkin Park spawning a hit single which earned a Grammy.

After he became the president of Def Jam Recordings, Jay-Z released a new album in late 2006 titled Kingdom Come. It spawned the top 10 single "Show Me What You Got", but its other singles were not as successful and some did not even chart. He later collaborated with T.I. on the single "Swagga like Us". In 2009, he released The Blueprint 3, which included his first chart-topping single "Empire State of Mind". The singles from the album went on to win several Grammys and peaked high on the charts as well. His 2011 collaborative album with Kanye West, Watch the Throne spawned the hit singles "H•A•M", "Otis", "Gotta Have It", and "Niggas in Paris"; the latter peaked at number 5 on the Hot 100 and sold 5 million units, becoming one of the biggest hits in both rappers' careers. His twelfth studio album Magna Carta Holy Grail was not promoted by any singles. In 2017, he released his thirteenth studio album, 4:44. The album's title track, as well as "The Story of O.J.", both charted in the top 40 on the Hot 100, despite the latter not being released as a single.

== As lead artist ==
List of singles as lead artist, with selected chart positions and certifications, showing year released and album name
Title	Year	Peak chart positions										Certifications	Album
Title	Year	US	US R&B	US Rap	CAN	GER	NLD	NZ	SWE	SWI	UK	Certifications	Album
"In My Lifetime" / "In My Lifetime (Remix)" / "Can't Get wit That"	1994	—	—	—	—	—	—	—	—	—	—		Non-album singles
"Dead Presidents"	1996	50 (Note: "Dead Presidents" and "Ain't No Nigga" charted as a double A-side single in the United States.)	74	4	—	—	—	—	—	—	—	RIAA: Gold	Non-album singles
"Ain't No Nigga" (featuring Foxy Brown)	1996	50	17	4	—	—	—	45	—	—	31		The Nutty Professor (soundtrack)/ Reasonable Doubt
"Can't Knock the Hustle" (featuring Mary J. Blige)	1996	73	35	7	—	—	—	26	—	—	30		Reasonable Doubt
"Feelin' It"	1997	79	46	13	—	—	—	—	—	—	—		Reasonable Doubt
"Who You Wit"	1997	84	25	18	—	—	—	—	—	—	65		Sprung (soundtrack)
"(Always Be My) Sunshine" (featuring Babyface and Foxy Brown)	1997	95	37	16	—	18	66	22	42	—	25		In My Lifetime, Vol. 1
"The City Is Mine" (featuring Blackstreet)	1997	52	37 (Note: "The City Is Mine" and "A Million and One Questions" charted as a double A-side single on the Billboard Hot R&B/Hip-Hop Songs and Hot Rap Songs charts.)	14	—	28	51	44	—	—	38		In My Lifetime, Vol. 1
"Wishing on a Star" (featuring Gwen Dickey)	1997	—	—	—	—	56	—	29	50	—	13		In My Lifetime, Vol. 1 (UK edition)
"It's Alright" (with Memphis Bleek)	1998	61	32	9	—	—	—	—	—	—	—		Streets Is Watching (soundtrack) / Vol. 2... Hard Knock Life
"Can I Get A..." (featuring Ja Rule and Amil)	1998	19	6	22	36	12	30	—	—	26	24	RIAA: Platinum	Vol. 2... Hard Knock Life/ Rush Hour (soundtrack)
"Hard Knock Life (Ghetto Anthem)"	1998	15	10	2	7	5	6	10	6	7	2	RIAA: 2× Platinum; BPI: Platinum; RMNZ: Platinum	Vol. 2... Hard Knock Life
"Money, Cash, Hoes" (featuring DMX)	1999	— (Note: "Money, Cash, Hoes" did not enter the Billboard Hot 100, but peaked at number 16 on the Bubbling Under Hot 100 Singles chart, which acts as a 25-song extension to the Hot 100.)	36	19	—	—	—	—	—	—	—		Vol. 2... Hard Knock Life
"Nigga What, Nigga Who (Originator 99)" (featuring Amil and Big Jaz)	1999	84	23	—	—	—	—	—	—	—	—		Vol. 2... Hard Knock Life
"Jigga My Nigga"	1999	28	6	1	—	—	—	—	—	—	—		Ryde or Die Vol. 1
"Girl's Best Friend"	1999	52	19	—	—	—	—	—	—	—	—		Blue Streak (soundtrack)
"Do It Again (Put Ya Hands Up)" (featuring Amil and Beanie Sigel)	1999	65	17	9	—	—	—	—	—	—	—		Vol. 3... Life and Times of S. Carter
"Things That U Do" (featuring Mariah Carey)	2000	—	— (Note: "Things That U Do" did not enter the Hot R&B/Hip-Hop Songs chart, but peaked at number 20 on the Bubbling Under R&B/Hip-Hop Singles chart, which acts as a 25-song extension to the R&B/Hip-Hop Songs chart.)	—	—	—	—	—	—	—	—		Vol. 3... Life and Times of S. Carter
"Anything"	2000	55	19	9 (Note: "Anything" and "Big Pimpin'" charted as a double A-side single on the Billboard Hot Rap Songs chart.)	—	—	—	—	56	—	18		The Truth
"Big Pimpin'" (featuring UGK)	2000	18	6	9	51	—	—	—	—	—	29	RIAA: 3× Platinum; BPI: Gold; RMNZ: Gold	Vol. 3... Life and Times of S. Carter
"Hey Papi" (featuring Amil and Memphis Bleek)	2000	76	16	12	—	—	—	—	—	—	—		Nutty Professor II: The Klumps (soundtrack)
"I Just Wanna Love U (Give It 2 Me)"	2000	11	1	4	—	75	61	31	—	86	17	RIAA: Platinum; BPI: Silver	The Dynasty: Roc La Familia
"Change the Game" (featuring Beanie Sigel and Memphis Bleek)	2001	86	29	10	—	—	—	—	—	—	—		The Dynasty: Roc La Familia
"Guilty Until Proven Innocent" (featuring R. Kelly)	2001	82	29	12	—	—	—	—	—	—	—		The Dynasty: Roc La Familia
"Izzo (H.O.V.A.)"	2001	8	4	7	—	—	69	—	—	53	21	RIAA: Platinum; BPI: Silver	The Blueprint
"Girls, Girls, Girls"	2001	17	4	9	—	86	—	—	—	—	11	RIAA: Gold	The Blueprint
"Jigga That Nigga"	2002	66	27	7	—	—	—	—	—	—	—		The Blueprint
"Song Cry"	2002	—	45	25	—	—	—	—	—	—	—	RIAA: Gold	The Blueprint
"'03 Bonnie & Clyde" (featuring Beyoncé)	2002	4	5	2	4	6	5	4	14	1	2	RIAA: Platinum; BPI: Platinum; RMNZ: Platinum	The Blueprint 2: The Gift & The Curse
"Hovi Baby"	2002	—	76	36	—	—	—	—	—	—	—		The Blueprint 2: The Gift & The Curse
"Excuse Me Miss"	2003	8	1	2	8	67	—	—	—	76	17	RIAA: Gold	The Blueprint 2: The Gift & The Curse
"La La La"	2003	— (Note: "La-La-La (Excuse Me Again)" did not enter the Billboard Hot 100, but peaked at number 12 on the Bubbling Under Hot 100 Singles chart, which acts as a 25-song extension to the Hot 100.)	37	20	—	—	—	—	—	—	—		The Blueprint 2.1/ Bad Boys II (soundtrack)
"Change Clothes"	2003	10	6	4	—	54	40	42	—	44	32		The Black Album
"Dirt off Your Shoulder"	2004	5	3	2	—	—	—	—	—	—	12 (Note: "Dirt off Your Shoulder" and "99 Problems" charted as a double A-side single in the United Kingdom.)	RIAA: 2× Platinum	The Black Album
"99 Problems"	2004	30	26	10	—	67	—	—	—	—	12	RIAA: 3× Platinum; BPI: Platinum; BVMI: Gold; RMNZ: Gold	The Black Album
"Big Chips" (with R. Kelly)	2004	39	17	14	—	—	—	—	—	—	—		Unfinished Business
"Don't Let Me Die" (with R. Kelly)	2004	— (Note: "Don't Let Me Die" did not enter the Billboard Hot 100, but peaked at number 24 on the Bubbling Under Hot 100 Singles chart, which acts as a 25-song extension to the Hot 100.)	58	—	—	—	—	—	—	—	—		Unfinished Business
"Numb/Encore" (with Linkin Park)	2004	20	94	—	—	4	5	—	5	10	14	RIAA: 3× Platinum; BPI: 4× Platinum; BVMI: 2× Platinum; GLF: Gold; MC: Gold; RMNZ: 4× Platinum	Collision Course
"Show Me What You Got"	2006	8	3	4	—	—	—	38	35	—	38	RIAA: Gold	Kingdom Come
"Lost One" (featuring Chrisette Michele)	2006	58	19	10	—	—	—	—	—	—	—	RIAA: Gold	Kingdom Come
"30 Something"	2007	— (Note: "30 Something" did not enter the Billboard Hot 100, but peaked at number seven on the Bubbling Under Hot 100 Singles chart, which acts as a 25-song extension to the Hot 100.)	21	13	—	—	—	—	—	—	—		Kingdom Come
"Hollywood" (featuring Beyoncé)	2007	—	56	21	—	—	—	—	—	—	—		Kingdom Come
"Blue Magic" (featuring Pharrell and En Vogue)	2007	55	31	17	69	—	—	—	—	—	—		American Gangster
"Roc Boys (And the Winner Is)..."	2007	63	15	8	—	—	—	—	—	—	117		American Gangster
"I Know" (featuring Pharrell)	2007	— (Note: "I Know" did not enter the Billboard Hot 100, but peaked at number 18 on the Bubbling Under Hot 100 Singles chart, which acts as a 25-song extension to the Hot 100.)	26	11	—	—	—	—	—	—	—		American Gangster
"Swagga Like Us" (with T.I., featuring Lil Wayne and Kanye West)	2008	5	11	4	—	—	—	—	22	—	33	RIAA: Platinum; MC: Gold	Paper Trail
"Jockin' Jay-Z (Dopeboy Fresh)"	2008	—	51	18	—	—	—	—	—	—	—		Non-album single
"D.O.A. (Death of Auto-Tune)"	2009	24	43	15	—	—	—	—	—	—	79	RIAA: Gold	The Blueprint 3
"Run This Town" (featuring Kanye West and Rihanna)	2009	2	3	1	6	18	30	9	8	9	1	RIAA: 6× Platinum; BPI: 2× Platinum; BVMI: Gold; RMNZ: 3× Platinum	The Blueprint 3
"Empire State of Mind" (featuring Alicia Keys)	2009	1	1	1	3	11	2	6	6	4	2	RIAA: Diamond; BPI: 3× Platinum; BVMI: 3× Gold; RMNZ: 6× Platinum	The Blueprint 3
"On to the Next One" (featuring Swizz Beatz)	2009	37	9	5	68	—	—	—	—	—	38	RIAA: Platinum	The Blueprint 3
"Young Forever" (featuring Mr Hudson)	2010	10	86	16	21	—	50	32	40	44	10	RIAA: 3× Platinum; BPI: Platinum; RMNZ: Gold	The Blueprint 3
"A Star Is Born" (featuring J. Cole)	2010	—	91	—	—	—	—	—	—	—	—		The Blueprint 3
"H•A•M" (with Kanye West)	2011	23	24	15	47	—	53	—	—	—	30	RIAA: Platinum	Watch the Throne
"Otis" (with Kanye West, featuring Otis Redding)	2011	12	2	2	37	—	73	—	—	61	28	RIAA: 4× Platinum; BPI: Platinum; MC: Gold; RMNZ: Platinum	Watch the Throne
"Niggas in Paris" (with Kanye West)	2011	5	1	1	16	40	28	38	44	43	10	RIAA: 12× Platinum; BPI: 4× Platinum; BVMI: 2× Platinum; GLF: 2× Platinum; MC: Platinum; RMNZ: 5× Platinum	Watch the Throne
"Why I Love You" (with Kanye West, featuring Mr Hudson)	2011	—	—	—	—	—	—	—	—	52	87	BPI: Silver; RMNZ: Gold	Watch the Throne
"Gotta Have It" (with Kanye West)	2011	69	14	13	—	—	—	—	—	—	—	RIAA: Platinum; BPI: Silver; RMNZ: Gold	Watch the Throne
"Glory" (featuring B.I.C.)	2012	—	63	23	—	—	—	—	—	—	—		Non-album single
"No Church in the Wild" (with Kanye West, featuring Frank Ocean and The-Dream)	2012	72	31	20	92	—	—	—	—	—	37	RIAA: 3× Platinum; BPI: Platinum; RMNZ: Platinum	Watch the Throne
"Clique" (with Kanye West and Big Sean)	2012	12	2	3	17	—	85	—	—	—	22	RIAA: 4× Platinum; BPI: Gold; RMNZ: Platinum	Cruel Summer
"Holy Grail" (featuring Justin Timberlake)	2013	4	2	1	13	24	83	24	15	24	7	RIAA: 6× Platinum; BPI: Platinum; BVMI: Gold; GLF: 2× Platinum; MC: Platinum; RMNZ: Platinum	Magna Carta Holy Grail
"Tom Ford"	2013	39	11	8	—	—	—	—	—	—	164	RIAA: Platinum	Magna Carta Holy Grail
"Part II (On the Run)" (featuring Beyoncé)	2014	77	19	15	—	—	—	—	—	—	93	RIAA: Platinum	Magna Carta Holy Grail
"4:44"	2017	35	15	11	69	—	—	— (Note: "4:44" did not enter the NZ Top 40 Singles Chart, but peaked at number nine on the NZ Heatseeker Singles Chart.)	—	—	73	RIAA: Platinum; BPI: Silver; RMNZ: Gold	4:44
"Bam" (featuring Damian Marley)	2017	47	21	16	—	—	—	—	—	—	93	RIAA: Gold	4:44
"Apeshit" (with Beyoncé as the Carters)	2018	13	9	8	24	—	59	—	72	69	33	RIAA: Platinum; BPI: Silver; MC: Platinum	Everything Is Love
"What It Feels Like" (with Nipsey Hussle)	2021	51	20	15	93	—	—	— (Note: "What It Feels Like" did not enter the NZ Top 40 Singles Chart, but peaked at number five on the NZ Hot Singles Chart.)	—	—	—		Judas and the Black Messiah (soundtrack)
"_" denotes a recording that did not chart or was not released in that territory.

== As featured artist ==
List of singles as featured artist, with selected chart positions and certifications, showing year released and album name
Title	Year	Peak chart positions										Certifications	Album
Title	Year	US	US R&B	US Rap	CAN	GER	NLD	NZ	SWE	SWI	UK	Certifications	Album
"Hawaiian Sophie" (The Jaz featuring Jay-Z)	1989	—	—	18	—	—	—	—	—	—	—		Word to the Jaz
"The Originators" (The Jaz featuring Jay-Z)	1990	—	—	13	—	—	—	—	—	—	—		To Your Soul
“Can I Get Open” (Original Flavor featuring Jay-Z)	1993	—	—	—	—	—	—	—	—	—	—		Beyond Flavor
"Show & Prove" (Big Daddy Kane featuring Big Scoob, Sauce Money, Shyheim, Jay-Z and Ol' Dirty Bastard)	1994	—	—	—	—	—	—	—	—	—	—		Daddy's Home
"I Don't Wanna Be Alone" (Remix) (Shai featuring Jay-Z)	1996	—	—	—	—	—	—	—	—	—	—		Non-album single
"All of My Days" (Changing Faces featuring Jay-Z and R. Kelly)	1996	65	38	—	—	—	—	—	—	—	—		Space Jam (soundtrack) / All Day, All Night
"I'll Be" (Foxy Brown featuring Jay-Z)	1996	7	5	2	—	48	33	20	51	—	9	RIAA: Gold	Ill Na Na
"Be Alone No More" (Remix) (Another Level featuring Jay-Z)	1998	—	—	—	—	—	—	27	—	—	11	BPI: Silver	Another Level
"Love for Free" (Rell featuring Jay-Z)	1998	86	28	—	—	—	—	—	—	—	—		Streets Is Watching (soundtrack)
"Money Ain't a Thang" (Jermaine Dupri featuring Jay-Z)	1998	52	10	28	—	—	—	—	—	—	—		Life in 1472 / Vol. 2... Hard Knock Life
"4 Alarm Blaze" (M.O.P. featuring Teflon and Jay-Z)	1998	—	—	—	—	—	—	—	—	—	—		First Family 4 Life
"Lobster & Scrimp" (Timbaland featuring Jay-Z)	1998	—	59	—	—	—	—	—	—	—	48		Tim's Bio: Life from da Bassment
"Heartbreaker" (Mariah Carey featuring Jay-Z)	1999	1	1	1	1	1	7	1	18	7	5	RIAA: 2× Platinum; BPI: Gold; RMNZ: Platinum	Rainbow
"What You Think of That" (Memphis Bleek featuring Jay-Z)	1999	—	— (Note: "What You Think of That" did not enter the Hot R&B/Hip-Hop Songs chart, but peaked at number nine on the Bubbling Under R&B/Hip-Hop Singles chart, which acts as a 25-song extension to the R&B/Hip-Hop Songs chart.)	49	—	—	—	—	—	—	58		Coming of Age
"Best of Me Part II" (Mýa featuring Jay-Z)	2000	—	55	—	—	—	—	—	—	—	—		Backstage: A Hard Knock Life
"4 da Fam" (Amil featuring Jay-Z, Beanie Sigel and Memphis Bleek)	2000	—	99	29	—	—	—	—	—	—	—		All Money Is Legal
"Is That Your Chick (The Lost Verses)" (Memphis Bleek featuring Jay-Z, Twista, and Missy Elliott)	2000	68	18	7	—	—	—	—	—	—	—		The Understanding
"Do My..." (Memphis Bleek featuring Jay-Z)	2001	—	68	24	—	—	—	—	—	—	—		The Understanding
"Mi Amor" (Angie Martinez featuring Jay-Z)	2001	—	51	—	—	—	—	—	—	—	—		Up Close and Personal
"Fiesta" (Remix) (R. Kelly featuring Jay-Z and Boo & Gotti)	2001	6	1	—	19	8	48	—	46	11	23		TP-2.com
"Guess Who's Back" (Scarface featuring Jay-Z and Beanie Sigel)	2002	79	28	5	—	—	—	—	—	—	—		The Fix
"What We Do" (Freeway featuring Jay-Z and Beanie Sigel)	2002	97	47	—	—	—	—	—	—	—	—	RIAA: Gold	Philadelphia Freeway
"Beware of the Boys (Mundian To Bach Ke)" (Panjabi MC featuring Jay-Z)	2003	33	21	—	10	—	—	—	—	—	25		Beware
"Crazy in Love" (Beyoncé featuring Jay-Z)	2003	1	1	1	2	6	2	2	4	3	1	RIAA: 8× Platinum; BPI: 5× Platinum; BVMI: 3× Gold; MC: 5× Platinum; RMNZ: 6× Platinum	Dangerously in Love
"Frontin'" (Pharrell featuring Jay-Z)	2003	5	1	—	15	61	21	—	49	23	6	BPI: Gold; RMNZ: Platinum	The Neptunes Presents Clones
"Storm" (Lenny Kravitz featuring Jay-Z)	2004	98	50	—	—	—	—	—	—	—	—		Baptism
"Dear Summer" (Memphis Bleek featuring Jay-Z)	2005	— (Note: "Dear Summer" did not enter the Billboard Hot 100, but peaked at number 16 on the Bubbling Under Hot 100 Singles chart, which acts as a 25-song extension to the Hot 100.)	30	—	—	—	—	—	—	—	—		534
"Go Crazy" (Young Jeezy featuring Jay-Z)	2005	— (Note: "Go Crazy" did not enter the Billboard Hot 100, but peaked at number three on the Bubbling Under Hot 100 Singles chart, which acts as a 25-song extension to the Hot 100.)	22	22	—	—	—	—	—	—	—	RIAA: Gold	Let's Get It: Thug Motivation 101
"Get Throwed" (Bun B featuring Pimp C, Young Jeezy, Z-Ro and Jay-Z)	2006	—	49	24	—	—	—	—	—	—	—		Trill
"Déjà Vu" (Beyoncé featuring Jay-Z)	2006	4	1	—	—	9	13	15	11	3	1	RIAA: Platinum; BPI: Platinum; MC: Gold; RMNZ: Gold	B'Day
"Umbrella" (Rihanna featuring Jay-Z)	2007	1	4	—	1	1	2	1	2	1	1	RIAA: Diamond; BPI: 4× Platinum; BVMI: 2× Platinum; GLF: 2× Platinum; IFPI SWI: Gold; RMNZ: 6× Platinum	Good Girl Gone Bad
"Roc-A-Fella Billionaires" (Freeway featuring Jay-Z)	2007	—	63	—	—	—	—	—	—	—	—		Free at Last
"I Wanna Rock (The Kings' G-Mix)" (Snoop Dogg featuring Jay-Z)	2010	—	—	—	—	—	—	—	—	—	—		More Malice
"Hot Tottie" (Usher featuring Jay-Z)	2010	21	9	—	62	—	—	—	—	—	104	RIAA: Gold	Versus
"Monster" (Kanye West featuring Jay-Z, Rick Ross, Bon Iver and Nicki Minaj)	2010	18	30	15	43	—	—	—	—	—	146	RIAA: 3× Platinum; BPI: Platinum; RMNZ: Platinum	My Beautiful Dark Twisted Fantasy
"I Do" (Young Jeezy featuring Jay-Z and André 3000)	2012	61	4	9	—	—	—	—	—	—	—		Thug Motivation 103: Hustlerz Ambition
"Talk That Talk" (Rihanna featuring Jay-Z)	2012	31	12	—	30	—	61	37	41	11	25	RIAA: 2× Platinum; BPI: Gold; GLF: Gold; RMNZ: Platinum	Talk That Talk
"Suit & Tie" (Justin Timberlake featuring Jay-Z)	2013	3	2	—	3	25	10	14	—	31	3	RIAA: 2× Platinum; BPI: Platinum; MC: 2× Platinum; RMNZ: Platinum	The 20/20 Experience
"Pound Cake / Paris Morton Music 2" (Drake featuring Jay-Z)	2013	65	24	17	88	—	—	—	—	—	111	RIAA: Platinum; BPI: Gold; RMNZ: Platinum	Nothing Was the Same
"Drunk in Love" (Beyoncé featuring Jay-Z)	2013	2	1	—	50	70	39	30	16	40	9	RIAA: 8× Platinum; BPI: 2× Platinum; BVMI: Gold; MC: 4× Platinum; RMNZ: 3× Platinum	Beyoncé
"The Devil Is a Lie" (Rick Ross featuring Jay-Z)	2013	86	26	16	—	—	—	—	—	—	143	RIAA: Gold	Mastermind
"They Don't Love You No More" (DJ Khaled featuring Jay-Z, Meek Mill, Rick Ross and French Montana)	2014	— (Note: "They Don't Love You No More" did not enter the Billboard Hot 100, but peaked at number five on the Bubbling Under Hot 100 Singles chart, which acts as a 25-song extension to the Hot 100.)	30	17	—	—	—	—	—	—	—		I Changed a Lot
"Jungle" (Remix) (X Ambassadors and Jamie N Commons featuring Jay-Z)	2014	87	—	—	—	44	—	—	—	—	—		Non-album single
"Seen It All" (Jeezy featuring Jay-Z)	2014	85	24	20	—	—	—	—	—	—	—	RIAA: Platinum	Seen It All
"Pop Style" (Drake featuring The Throne)	2016	16	4	3	20	—	73	—	—	—	33	RIAA: 2× Platinum; BPI: Gold	Views_[R] _
"Drug Dealers Anonymous" (Pusha T featuring Jay-Z)	2016	—	—	—	—	—	—	—	—	—	—		Non-album single
"I Got the Keys" (DJ Khaled featuring Jay-Z and Future)	2016	30	9	5	55	95	—	—	—	—	125	RIAA: Platinum; MC: Platinum	Major Key
"Shining" (DJ Khaled featuring Beyoncé and Jay-Z)	2017	57	23	—	72	—	—	—	—	—	71	RIAA: Platinum; BPI: Silver; RMNZ: Gold	Grateful
"Biking" (Frank Ocean featuring Jay-Z and Tyler, the Creator)	2017	—	18	—	—	—	—	9	—	—	—	BPI: Silver; RMNZ: Platinum	Blonded Radio
"Top Off" (DJ Khaled featuring Jay-Z, Future and Beyoncé)	2018	22	14	11	48	98	—	— (Note: "Top Off" did not enter the NZ Top 40 Singles Chart, but peaked at number five on the NZ Heatseeker Singles Chart.)	—	66	41	RIAA: Platinum; MC: Gold	Father of Asahd
"Entrepreneur" (Pharrell featuring Jay-Z)	2020	—	—	—	—	—	—	—	—	—	—		Non-album single
"Neck & Wrist" (Pusha T featuring Jay-Z and Pharrell)	2022	76	23	18	69	—	—	—	—	—	—		It's Almost Dry
"Morning Dew (Donk) Remix"(Beyoncé featuring JAŸ-Z)	2026	—	—	—	—	—	—	—	—	—	—		Morning Dew (Donk) Remix Pack
"_" denotes a recording that did not chart or was not released in that territory. [R] Jay-Z only appears on the original single release version of "Pop Style" as part of The Throne; he was omitted from the subsequent solo version included on the Views album.

== Promotional singles ==
List of promotional singles, with selected chart positions, showing year released and album name
Title	Year	Peak chart positions				Certifications	Album
Title	Year	US	US R&B	US Rap	UK	Certifications	Album
"Can't Knock the Hustle" (Fool's Paradise Remix) (featuring Meli'sa Morgan)	1996	—	—	—	—		Non-album singles
"It's Obvious" (Rell featuring Jay-Z)	2002	—	—	—	—		Non-album singles
"Back in the Day" (Missy Elliott featuring Jay-Z and Tweet)	2003	—	86	—	—		Under Construction
"Shake It Off" (Remix) (Mariah Carey featuring Jay-Z and Young Jeezy)	2005	—	—	—	—		Non-album single
"Upgrade U" (Beyoncé featuring Jay-Z)	2006	59	11	—	176	RIAA: 2× Platinum; BPI: Silver; MC: Gold; RMNZ: Gold	B'Day
"Rehab" (Remix) (Amy Winehouse featuring Jay-Z)	2007	—	—	—	—		Non-album single
"Mr. Carter" (Lil Wayne featuring Jay-Z)	2008	62	27	13	—	RIAA: Platinum	Tha Carter III
"Put On" (Remix) (Young Jeezy featuring Jay-Z)	2008	—	—	—	—		The Recession
"Bye Bye" (So So Def Remix) (Mariah Carey featuring Jay-Z)	2008	—	—	—	—		Non-album single
"Brooklyn Go Hard" (featuring Santigold)	2008	—	61	18	—		Notorious (soundtrack)
"Lost+ / Viva la Vida" (live at the 51st Annual Grammy Awards) (Coldplay featuring Jay-Z)	2009	—	—	—	—		Non-album singles
"Know Bout Me" (Timbaland featuring Jay-Z, Drake and James Fauntleroy)	2013	—	—	—	—		Non-album singles
"All the Way Up" (Remix) (Fat Joe, Remy Ma and Jay-Z featuring French Montana and Infared)	2016	27	14	9	—		Non-album singles
"Spiritual"	2016	—	—	—	—		Non-album singles
"Adnis"	2017	—	—	—	—		4:44
"ManyFacedGod" (featuring James Blake)	2017	—	—	—	—		4:44
"Salud!" (with Beyoncé as the Carters)	2018	—	—	—	—		Everything Is Love
"Mood 4 Eva" (with Beyoncé and Childish Gambino featuring Oumou Sangare)	2019	90	33	48	64		The Lion King: The Gift
"—" denotes a recording that did not chart or was not released in that territory.

== Other charted and certified songs ==
Title	Year	Peak chart positions										Certifications	Album
Title	Year	US	US R&B /HH	US Rap	AUT	BEL (FL)	CAN	IRL	NOR	SWE	UK	Certifications	Album
"So Ghetto"	2000	—	— (Note: "So Ghetto" did not enter the Hot R&B/Hip-Hop Songs chart, but peaked at number nine on the Bubbling Under R&B/Hip-Hop Singles chart, which acts as a 25-song extension to the R&B/Hip-Hop Songs chart.)	—	—	—	—	—	—	—	—		Vol. 3... Life and Times of S. Carter
"Parking Lot Pimpin'" (featuring Beanie Sigel and Memphis Bleek)	2000	—	— (Note: "Parking Lot Pimpin'" did not enter the Hot R&B/Hip-Hop Songs chart, but peaked at number 13 on the Bubbling Under R&B/Hip-Hop Singles chart, which acts as a 25-song extension to the R&B/Hip-Hop Songs chart.)	—	—	—	—	—	—	—	—		The Dynasty: Roc La Familia
"U Don't Know"	2001	—	— (Note: "U Don't Know" did not enter the Hot R&B/Hip-Hop Songs chart, but peaked at number five on the Bubbling Under R&B/Hip-Hop Singles chart, which acts as a 25-song extension to the R&B/Hip-Hop Songs chart.)	—	—	—	—	—	—	—	—		The Blueprint
"Heart of the City (Ain't No Love)"	2001	—	—	—	—	—	—	—	—	—	—	RIAA: Gold	The Blueprint
"Renegade" (featuring Eminem)	2001	—	—	—	—	—	—	—	—	—	—	RIAA: Gold; BPI: Silver; RMNZ: Gold	The Blueprint
"Think It's a Game" (Beanie Sigel featuring Jay-Z, Freeway and Lil Chris)	2001	—	99	—	—	—	—	—	—	—	—		The Reason
"People Talking"	2002	—	77	—	—	—	—	—	—	—	—		Jay-Z: Unplugged
"The Best of Both Worlds" (with R. Kelly)	2002	— (Note: "The Best of Both Worlds" did not enter the Billboard Hot 100, but peaked at number 15 on the Bubbling Under Hot 100 Singles chart, which acts as a 25-song extension to the Hot 100.)	39	—	—	—	—	—	—	—	—		The Best of Both Worlds
"Somebody's Girl" (with R. Kelly)	2002	—	41	24	—	—	—	—	—	—	—		The Best of Both Worlds
"Shake Ya Body" (with R. Kelly, featuring Lil' Kim)	2002	—	72	—	—	—	—	—	—	—	—		The Best of Both Worlds
"Welcome to New York City" (Cam'ron featuring Jay-Z and Juelz Santana)	2002	—	55	—	—	—	—	—	—	—	—		Come Home with Me
"The Watcher 2" (featuring Dr. Dre, Truth Hurts and Rakim)	2003	—	— (Note: "The Watcher 2" did not enter the Hot R&B/Hip-Hop Songs chart, but peaked at number 23 on the Bubbling Under R&B/Hip-Hop Singles chart, which acts as a 25-song extension to the R&B/Hip-Hop Songs chart.)	—	—	—	—	—	—	—	—		The Blueprint 2: The Gift & The Curse
"The Bounce" (featuring Kanye West)	2003	—	— (Note: "The Bounce" did not enter the Hot R&B/Hip-Hop Songs chart, but peaked at number 22 on the Bubbling Under R&B/Hip-Hop Singles chart, which acts as a 25-song extension to the R&B/Hip-Hop Songs chart.)	—	—	—	—	—	—	—	—		The Blueprint 2: The Gift & The Curse
"All Around the World" (featuring LaToiya Williams)	2003	—	— (Note: "All Around the World" did not enter the Hot R&B/Hip-Hop Songs chart, but peaked at number 10 on the Bubbling Under R&B/Hip-Hop Singles chart, which acts as a 25-song extension to the R&B/Hip-Hop Songs chart.)	—	—	—	—	—	—	—	—		The Blueprint 2: The Gift & The Curse
"Stop"	2003	—	53	—	—	—	—	—	—	—	—		The Blueprint 2.1
"Love & Life Intro" (Mary J. Blige featuring Jay-Z and P. Diddy)	2003	—	— (Note: "Love & Life Intro" did not enter the Hot R&B/Hip-Hop Songs chart, but peaked at number 21 on the Bubbling Under R&B/Hip-Hop Singles chart, which acts as a 25-song extension to the R&B/Hip-Hop Songs chart.)	—	—	—	—	—	—	—	—		Love & Life
"What More Can I Say"	2003	—	48	—	—	—	—	—	—	—	—		The Black Album
"Public Service Announcement (Interlude)"	2003	—	— (Note: "Public Service Announcement (Interlude)" did not enter the Hot R&B/Hip-Hop Songs chart, but peaked at number seven on the Bubbling Under R&B/Hip-Hop Singles chart, which acts as a 25-song extension to the R&B/Hip-Hop Songs chart.)	—	—	—	—	—	—	—	—	RIAA: Gold	The Black Album
"Encore"	2003	— (Note: "Encore" did not enter the Billboard Hot 100, but peaked at number six on the Bubbling Under Hot 100 Singles chart, which acts as a 25-song extension to the Hot 100.)	30	22	—	—	—	—	—	—	—	RIAA: Gold	The Black Album
"December 4th"	2004	—	— (Note: "December 4th" did not enter the Hot R&B/Hip-Hop Songs chart, but peaked at number five on the Bubbling Under R&B/Hip-Hop Singles chart, which acts as a 25-song extension to the R&B/Hip-Hop Songs chart.)	—	—	—	—	—	—	—	—		The Black Album
"Lucifer"	2004	—	— (Note: "Lucifer" did not enter the Hot R&B/Hip-Hop Songs chart, but peaked at number 14 on the Bubbling Under R&B/Hip-Hop Singles chart, which acts as a 25-song extension to the R&B/Hip-Hop Songs chart.)	—	—	—	—	—	—	—	—	RIAA: Gold	The Black Album
"Never Let Me Down" (Kanye West featuring Jay-Z and J. Ivy)	2004	—	—	—	—	—	—	—	—	—	—	RIAA: Gold	The College Dropout
"The Return" (with R. Kelly)	2004	—	— (Note: "The Return" did not enter the Hot R&B/Hip-Hop Songs chart, but peaked at number four on the Bubbling Under R&B/Hip-Hop Singles chart, which acts as a 25-song extension to the R&B/Hip-Hop Songs chart.)	—	—	—	—	—	—	—	—		Unfinished Business
"Dirt off Your Shoulder/Lying from You" (with Linkin Park)	2004	—	—	—	—	—	—	—	—	—	150	BPI: Gold	Collision Course
"Whatchu Want" (The Notorious B.I.G. featuring Jay-Z)	2005	—	76	—	—	—	—	—	—	—	—		Duets: The Final Chapter
"Here We Go Yo" (Héctor el Father featuring Jay-Z)	2006	—	—	—	—	—	—	—	—	—	—		Los Rompe Discotekas
"Kingdom Come"	2006	98	52	25	—	—	—	—	—	—	—		Kingdom Come
"Brooklyn High"	2006	—	— (Note: "Brooklyn High" did not enter the Hot R&B/Hip-Hop Songs chart, but peaked at number three on the Bubbling Under R&B/Hip-Hop Singles chart, which acts as a 25-song extension to the R&B/Hip-Hop Songs chart.)	—	—	—	—	—	—	—	—		Non-album singles
"Turn Off the Lights" (Mary J. Blige featuring Jay-Z)	2006	—	— (Note: "Turn Off the Lights" did not enter the Hot R&B/Hip-Hop Songs chart, but peaked at number 15 on the Bubbling Under R&B/Hip-Hop Singles chart, which acts as a 25-song extension to the R&B/Hip-Hop Songs chart.)	—	—	—	—	—	—	—	—		Non-album singles
"Black Republican" (Nas featuring Jay-Z)	2006	— (Note: "Black Republican" did not enter the Billboard Hot 100, but peaked at number 24 on the Bubbling Under Hot 100 Singles chart, which acts as a 25-song extension to the Hot 100.)	— (Note: "Black Republican" did not enter the Hot R&B/Hip-Hop Songs chart, but peaked at number two on the Bubbling Under R&B/Hip-Hop Singles chart, which acts as a 25-song extension to the R&B/Hip-Hop Songs chart.)	—	—	—	—	—	—	—	—		Hip Hop Is Dead
"Hello Brooklyn 2.0" (featuring Lil Wayne)	2007	—	— (Note: "Hello Brooklyn 2.0" did not enter the Hot R&B/Hip-Hop Songs chart, but peaked at number five on the Bubbling Under R&B/Hip-Hop Singles chart, which acts as a 25-song extension to the R&B/Hip-Hop Songs chart.)	—	—	—	—	—	—	—	—		American Gangster
"American Dreamin'"	2007	—	— (Note: "American Dreamin'" did not enter the Hot R&B/Hip-Hop Songs chart, but peaked at number 25 on the Bubbling Under R&B/Hip-Hop Singles chart, which acts as a 25-song extension to the R&B/Hip-Hop Songs chart.)	—	—	—	—	—	—	—	—		American Gangster
"Brooklyn" (Fabolous featuring Jay-Z and Uncle Murda)	2007	—	— (Note: "Brooklyn" did not enter the Hot R&B/Hip-Hop Songs chart, but peaked at number nine on the Bubbling Under R&B/Hip-Hop Singles chart, which acts as a 25-song extension to the R&B/Hip-Hop Songs chart.)	—	—	—	—	—	—	—	—		From Nothin' to Somethin'
"You're Welcome" (featuring Mary J. Blige)	2008	—	55	23	—	—	—	—	—	—	—		Non-album singles
"Ain't I" (featuring Timbaland)	2008	—	— (Note: "Ain't I" did not enter the Hot R&B/Hip-Hop Songs chart, but peaked at number 13 on the Bubbling Under R&B/Hip-Hop Singles chart, which acts as a 25-song extension to the R&B/Hip-Hop Songs chart.)	—	—	—	—	—	—	—	—		Non-album singles
"Maybach Music" (Rick Ross featuring Jay-Z)	2008	—	—	—	—	—	—	—	—	—	—		Trilla
"Best Thing" (Usher featuring Jay-Z)	2008	—	92	—	—	—	—	—	—	—	—		Here I Stand
"Lost+" (Coldplay featuring Jay-Z)	2008	40	—	—	—	34	—	22	8	21	—		Prospekt's March
"I Do It for Hip-Hop" (Ludacris featuring Nas and Jay-Z)	2008	—	89	—	—	—	—	—	—	—	—		Theater of the Mind
"What We Talkin' About" (featuring Luke Steele)	2009	—	—	—	—	—	—	—	—	—	—		The Blueprint 3
"Real as It Gets" (featuring Young Jeezy)	2009	—	81	—	—	—	—	—	—	—	—		The Blueprint 3
"Off That" (featuring Drake)	2009	—	—	—	—	—	—	—	—	—	—		The Blueprint 3
"Venus vs. Mars"	2009	—	90	—	—	—	—	—	—	—	—		The Blueprint 3
"Stranded (Haiti Mon Amour)" (with Bono, The Edge and Rihanna)	2010	16	—	—	10	39	6	3	6	3	41		Hope for Haiti Now
"Light Up" (Drake featuring Jay-Z)	2010	—	85	—	—	—	—	—	—	—	—		Thank Me Later
"Under Pressure" (Dr. Dre featuring Jay-Z)	2010	—	— (Note: "Under Pressure" did not enter the Hot R&B/Hip-Hop Songs chart, but peaked at number five on the Bubbling Under R&B/Hip-Hop Singles chart, which acts as a 25-song extension to the R&B/Hip-Hop Songs chart.)	—	—	—	—	—	—	—	—		Non-album single
"Free Mason" (Rick Ross featuring Jay-Z)	2010	—	— (Note: "Free Mason" did not enter the Hot R&B/Hip-Hop Songs chart, but peaked at number nine on the Bubbling Under R&B/Hip-Hop Singles chart, which acts as a 25-song extension to the R&B/Hip-Hop Songs chart.)	—	—	—	—	—	—	—	—		Teflon Don
"So Appalled" (Kanye West featuring Jay-Z, Pusha T, Cyhi Da Prynce, Swizz Beatz and RZA)	2010	—	— (Note: "So Appalled" did not enter the Hot R&B/Hip-Hop Songs chart, but peaked at number 14 on the Bubbling Under R&B/Hip-Hop Singles chart, which acts as a 25-song extension to the R&B/Hip-Hop Songs chart.)	—	—	—	—	—	—	—	—	RIAA: Gold	My Beautiful Dark Twisted Fantasy
"Who Gon Stop Me" (with Kanye West)	2011	44	—	—	—	—	60	—	—	—	—	RIAA: Platinum	Watch the Throne
"Illest Motherfucker Alive" (with Kanye West)	2011	— (Note: "Illest Motherfucker Alive" did not enter the Billboard Hot 100, but peaked at number four on the Bubbling Under Hot 100 Singles chart, which acts as a 25-song extension to the Hot 100.)	—	—	—	—	—	—	—	—	—		Watch the Throne
"Welcome to the Jungle" (with Kanye West)	2011	—	— (Note: "Welcome to the Jungle" did not enter the Hot R&B/Hip-Hop Songs chart, but peaked at number four on the Bubbling Under R&B/Hip-Hop Singles chart, which acts as a 25-song extension to the R&B/Hip-Hop Songs chart.)	—	—	—	—	—	—	—	—		Watch the Throne
"Mr. Nice Watch" (J. Cole featuring Jay-Z)	2011	— (Note: "Mr. Nice Watch" did not enter the Billboard Hot 100, but peaked at number 19 on the Bubbling Under Hot 100 Singles chart, which acts as a 25-song extension to the Hot 100.)	87	—	—	—	—	—	—	—	—		Cole World: The Sideline Story
"3 Kings" (Rick Ross featuring Dr. Dre and Jay-Z)	2012	— (Note: "3 Kings" did not enter the Billboard Hot 100, but peaked at number 19 on the Bubbling Under Hot 100 Singles chart, which acts as a 25-song extension to the Hot 100.)	60	—	—	—	—	—	—	—	—		God Forgives, I Don't
"FuckWithMeYouKnowIGotIt" (featuring Rick Ross)	2013	64	24	18	—	—	—	—	—	—	—	RIAA: Platinum	Magna Carta... Holy Grail
"Oceans" (featuring Frank Ocean)	2013	83	30	22	—	—	—	—	—	—	153	RIAA: Gold	Magna Carta... Holy Grail
"Picasso Baby"	2013	91	34	25	—	—	—	—	—	—	—		Magna Carta... Holy Grail
"Crown"	2013	100	38	—	—	—	—	—	—	—	—		Magna Carta... Holy Grail
"Somewhere in America"	2013	— (Note: "Somewhere in America" did not enter the Billboard Hot 100, but peaked at number two on the Bubbling Under Hot 100 Singles chart, which acts as a 25-song extension to the Hot 100.)	43	—	—	—	—	—	—	—	—		Magna Carta... Holy Grail
"F.U.T.W."	2013	— (Note: "F.U.T.W." did not enter the Billboard Hot 100, but peaked at number nine on the Bubbling Under Hot 100 Singles chart, which acts as a 25-song extension to the Hot 100.)	45	—	—	—	—	—	—	—	—		Magna Carta... Holy Grail
"Heaven"	2013	— (Note: "Heaven" did not enter the Billboard Hot 100, but peaked at number 10 on the Bubbling Under Hot 100 Singles chart, which acts as a 25-song extension to the Hot 100.)	46	—	—	—	—	—	—	—	—		Magna Carta... Holy Grail
"Versus"	2013	—	— (Note: "Versus" did not enter the Hot R&B/Hip-Hop Songs chart, but peaked at number nine on the Bubbling Under R&B/Hip-Hop Singles chart, which acts as a 25-song extension to the R&B/Hip-Hop Songs chart.)	—	—	—	—	—	—	—	—		Magna Carta... Holy Grail
"BBC"	2013	— (Note: "BBC" did not enter the Billboard Hot 100, but peaked at number 13 on the Bubbling Under Hot 100 Singles chart, which acts as a 25-song extension to the Hot 100.)	47	—	—	—	—	—	—	—	—		Magna Carta... Holy Grail
"La Familia"	2013	—	— (Note: "La Familia" did not enter the Hot R&B/Hip-Hop Songs chart, but peaked at number one on the Bubbling Under R&B/Hip-Hop Singles chart, which acts as a 25-song extension to the R&B/Hip-Hop Songs chart.)	—	—	—	—	—	—	—	—		Magna Carta... Holy Grail
"Jay Z Blue"	2013	—	— (Note: "Jay Z Blue" did not enter the Hot R&B/Hip-Hop Songs chart, but peaked at number two on the Bubbling Under R&B/Hip-Hop Singles chart, which acts as a 25-song extension to the R&B/Hip-Hop Songs chart.)	—	—	—	—	—	—	—	—		Magna Carta... Holy Grail
"Nickels and Dimes"	2013	—	— (Note: "Nickels and Dimes" did not enter the Hot R&B/Hip-Hop Songs chart, but peaked at number four on the Bubbling Under R&B/Hip-Hop Singles chart, which acts as a 25-song extension to the R&B/Hip-Hop Songs chart.)	—	—	—	—	—	—	—	—		Magna Carta... Holy Grail
"Open Letter"	2013	—	—	23 (Note: "Open Letter" did not enter the Hot Rap Songs chart, but peaked at number 23 on the Rap Airplay chart.)	—	—	—	—	—	—	—		Magna Carta... Holy Grail
"Murder" (Justin Timberlake featuring Jay-Z)	2013	—	— (Note: "Murder" did not enter the Hot R&B/Hip-Hop Songs chart, but peaked at number seven on the Bubbling Under R&B/Hip-Hop Singles chart, which acts as a 25-song extension to the R&B/Hip-Hop Songs chart.)	—	—	—	—	—	—	—	—		The 20/20 Experience – 2 of 2
"The Story of O.J."	2017	23	10	7	—	—	53	—	—	—	88	RIAA: Platinum	4:44
"Kill Jay Z"	2017	55	23	18	—	—	—	—	—	—	—		4:44
"Smile" (featuring Gloria Carter)	2017	56	24	19	—	—	—	—	—	—	—		4:44
"Caught Their Eyes" (featuring Frank Ocean)	2017	63	29	22	—	—	—	—	—	—	—		4:44
"Family Feud" (featuring Beyoncé)	2017	51	22	17	—	—	—	—	—	—	—	RIAA: Gold	4:44
"Moonlight"	2017	86	39	—	—	—	—	—	—	—	—		4:44
"Marcy Me"	2017	90	40	—	—	—	—	—	—	—	—		4:44
"Legacy"	2017	— (Note: "Legacy" did not enter the Billboard Hot 100, but peaked at number one on the Bubbling Under Hot 100 Singles chart, which acts as a 25-song extension to the Hot 100.)	47	—	—	—	—	—	—	—	—		4:44
"Nice" (with Beyoncé as the Carters)	2018	95	48	—	—	—	—	—	—	—	—		Everything Is Love
"Summer" (with Beyoncé as the Carters)	2018	84	42	96	—	—	—	—	—	—	—		Everything Is Love
"Boss" (with Beyoncé as the Carters)	2018	77	38	—	—	—	—	—	—	—	87	RIAA: Gold	Everything Is Love
"Talk Up" (Drake featuring Jay-Z)	2018	20	17	15	71	—	17	—	—	55	—		Scorpion
"Friends" (with Beyoncé as the Carters)	2019	99	— (Note: "Friends" did not enter the Billboard Hot R&B/Hip Hop Songs, but reached number 1 on the Bubbling Under R&B/Hip-Hop Singles extension chart.)	—	—	—	—	—	—	—	—		Everything Is Love
"The Blinding" (with Jay Electronica featuring Travis Scott)	2020	—	—	—	—	—	—	—	—	—	—		A Written Testimony
"Sorry Not Sorry" (DJ Khaled featuring Nas, Jay-Z, and James Fauntleroy)	2021	30	13	11	—	—	65	—	—	—	80	RIAA: Gold	Khaled Khaled
"Jail" (Kanye West featuring Jay-Z)	2021	10	3	3	—	—	9	9	—	—	11	RIAA: Gold; MC: Gold; RMNZ: Gold	Donda
"Love All" (Drake featuring Jay-Z)	2021	10	9	9	—	—	20	—	—	57	—	RIAA: Platinum; BPI: Silver; RMNZ: Gold	Certified Lover Boy
"God Did" (DJ Khaled featuring Rick Ross, Lil Wayne, Jay-Z, John Legend, and Fridayy)	2022	17	6	3	—	—	29	—	—	—	50	RIAA: Gold	God Did
"_" denotes a recording that did not chart or was not released in that territory.

== Other appearances ==
List of non-single guest appearances, with other performing artists, showing year released and album name
Title	Year	Other artist(s)	Album
"H. P. Gets Busy"	1986	High Potent	Non-album single
"It's That Simple"	1990	Jaz-O	To Your Soul
"Good Thang" (Remix)	1992	Glenn Jones	Non-album singles
"My Kinda Girl (Remix)"	1992	The Rude Boys	Non-album singles
"Many Styles"	1994	Original Flavor	Beyond Flavor
"Da Graveyard"	1995	Big L, Lord Finesse, Microphone Nut, Party Arty & Grand Daddy I.U.	Lifestylez ov da Poor & Dangerous
"Time to Build"	1995	Mic Geronimo, Ja Rule, DMX	The Natural
"Things We Do For Love (Remix)"	1996	Horace Brown	
"So Many Ways" (Soundtrack Version)	1996	The Braxtons	High School High (soundtrack)
"'96 Anthem - You're the One (Allstar Remix)"	1996	SWV, Lost Boyz, Smoothe da Hustler, Trigga tha Gambler, Busta Rhymes	Non-album single
"Big Momma Thang"	1996	Lil' Kim, Lil' Cease	Hard Core
"Foundation"	1996	Jaz-O, Sauce Money, Tone Hooker	Non-album single
"No Love Lost"	1996	Shaquille O'Neal, Lord Tariq, Nas	You Can't Stop the Reign
"Only a Customer"	1997	—N/a	Dangerous Ground (soundtrack) / Streets Is Watching (soundtrack)
"I Love the Dough"	1997	The Notorious B.I.G., Angela Winbush	Life After Death
"Young G's"	1997	Puff Daddy & the Family, The Notorious B.I.G.	No Way Out
"Call Me"	1997	Blackstreet	Soul Food (Soundtrack)
"Cheat on You"	1997	Mase, Lil' Cease, 112	Harlem World
"Single Life"	1997	Mic Geronimo, Carl Thomas	Vendetta
"From Marcy to Hollywood"	1998	Sauce Money, Memphis Bleek	The Players Club (soundtrack)
"What the Game Made Me"	1998	Sauce Money, Memphis Bleek	I Got the Hook-Up (soundtrack)
"Your Love"	1998	Christión	Streets Is Watching (soundtrack)
"Murdergram"	1998	DMX, Ja Rule	Streets Is Watching (soundtrack)
"Celebration"	1998	Memphis Bleek, Wais, Sauce Money	Streets Is Watching (soundtrack)
"Keep It Real"	1998	Jon B., Coko	Hav Plenty (Soundtrack)
"Ha" (Remix)	1998	Juvenile	400 Degreez
"Pre-Game"	1998	Sauce Money	Belly (soundtrack) / Middle Finger U
"Like That"	1998	Kid Capri, Liz Lite	Soundtrack to the Streets / Vol. 2... Hard Knock Life
"We Ride"	1998	R. Kelly, Cam'ron, N.O.R.E.	R.
"Gangsta Shit"	1998	DJ Clue?, Ja Rule	The Professional
"Blackout"	1998	DMX, The Lox	Flesh of My Flesh, Blood of My Blood
"You Know What We Bout"	1999	Silkk the Shocker, Master P	Made Man
"Bonnie & Clyde (Part II)"	1999	Foxy Brown	Chyna Doll
"Kill 'Em All"	1999	Ja Rule	Venni Vetti Vecci
"It's Murda"	1999	Ja Rule, DMX	Venni Vetti Vecci
"This Life Forever"	1999	—N/a	Black Gangster (soundtrack)
"Bonafide"	1999	O.C.	Non-album single
"4 My Niggaz"	1999	Blake C, Lil' Cease, Mr. Bristal	The Wonderful World of Cease A Leo
"Do You Like It... Do You Want It..."	1999	Puff Daddy	Forever
"For My Thugs"	1999	Funkmaster Flex, Big Kap, Memphis Bleek, Beanie Sigel, Amil	The Tunnel
"Raw & Uncut"	2000	Beanie Sigel	The Truth
"Playa"	2000	Beanie Sigel, Amil	The Truth
"Why We Die"	2000	Busta Rhymes, DMX	Anarchy
"Face-Off 2000"	2000	Sauce Money	Middle Finger U
"Road Dawgs"	2000	Amil, Da Brat, Eve	Backstage: Music Inspired by the Film
"People's Court"	2000	—N/a	Backstage: Music Inspired by the Film
"Heard It All"	2000	Amil	All Money Is Legal
"That's Right"	2000	Amil	All Money Is Legal
"Get Out"	2000	Scarface	The Last of a Dying Breed
"Change Up"	2000	Memphis Bleek, Beanie Sigel	The Understanding
"My Mind Right (Remix)"	2000	Memphis Bleek, Beanie Sigel, H-Money Bags	The Understanding
"PYT"	2000	Memphis Bleek, Amil	The Understanding
"Jay-Z Freestyle"	2001	DJ Clue	The Professional 2
"Change the Game (Remix)"	2001	DJ Clue, Beanie Sigel, Memphis Bleek, Tha Doggpound	The Professional 2
"Mi Amor"	2001	Angie Martinez	Up Close And Personal
"One Minute Man (Remix)"	2001	Missy Elliott	Miss E... So Addictive
"Still Got Love for You	2001	Beanie Sigel, Rell	The Reason
"You Rock My World (Trackmasters Mix)"	2001	Michael Jackson	Non-album single
"Party People"	2001	Timbaland & Magoo, Twista	Indecent Proposal
"People Talking" (bonus track)	2001	—N/a	MTV Unplugged
"Rock Steady"	2001	Mary J. Blige, Lenny Kravitz	—N/a
"Alone in This World (Remix)"	2002	Faith Evans	—N/a
"Foolish (Remix)" {unreleased}	2002	Ashanti	—N/a
"Let's Go!"	2002	Jaz-O, Dibiase	Kingz Kounty
"Welcome to New York City"	2002	Cam'ron, Juelz Santana	Come Home with Me
"Roc Army"	2002	Roc Fam	Paid in Full (soundtrack)
"1, 2 Y'all"	2002	Memphis Bleek, Geda K, Lil Cease	Paid in Full (soundtrack)/ M.A.D.E.
"Don't You Know"	2002	—N/a	Paid in Full (soundtrack)
"Get By (Remix)"	2002	Black Star, Busta Rhymes, Kanye West	Non-album single
"Lollipop"	2002	Snoop Dogg, Soopafly, Nate Dogg	Paid tha Cost to Be da Boss
"8 Miles and Runnin'"	2002	Freeway	8 Mile OST
"Count It Off"	2002	Ms. Jade	Girl Interrupted
"You Got Me"	2002	Mariah Carey, Freeway	Charmbracelet /Philadelphia Freeway
"H.O.V.A."	2003	DJ Envy	The Desert Storm Mixtape: Blok Party, Vol. 1
"That's How You Like It"	2003	Beyoncé	Dangerously in Love
"It's On"	2003	Beanie Sigel	The Chain Gang Vol. 2 / The B. Coming
"Love & Life Intro"	2003	Mary J. Blige, P. Diddy	Love & Life
"Flip Flop Rock"	2003	OutKast, Killer Mike	Speakerboxxx/The Love Below
"Wake Up"	2003	Missy Elliott	This Is Not a Test!
"Everything's a Go"	2003	Memphis Bleek	M.A.D.E.
"Hypnotic"	2003	Memphis Bleek, Beanie Sigel	M.A.D.E.
"Murda Murda"	2003	Memphis Bleek, Beanie Sigel	M.A.D.E.
"Miss You (Remix)"	2003	Aaliyah	Non-album single
"Never Take Me Alive"	2004	Young Gunz	Tough Luv
"Drop It Like It's Hot (Remix)"	2004	Snoop Dogg, Pharrell	Non-album single
""Hell Yeah (Pimp the System) [Remix]"	2004	Dead Prez	RBG: Revolutionary but Gangsta
"Can't Hide From Luv"	2005	Mary J. Blige	The Breakthrough
"Diamonds from Sierra Leone (Remix)"	2005	Kanye West	Late Registration
"Whatchu Want (The Commission)"	2005	The Notorious B.I.G.	Duets: The Final Chapter
"Pressure"	2006	Lupe Fiasco	Lupe Fiasco's Food & Liquor
"Young Girl"	2006	Pharrell	In My Mind
"Hustlin' (Remix)"	2006	Rick Ross, Young Jeezy	Port of Miami
"Black Republican"	2006	Nas	Hip Hop Is Dead
"Crazy"	2007	Ne-Yo	Because of You
"Thriller"	2007	Fall Out Boy	Infinity on High
"I Get Money (Remix)"	2007	50 Cent, Diddy	Curtis
"Brooklyn"	2007	Fabolous, Uncle Murda	From Nothin' to Somethin'
"Watch What You Say to Me"	2007	T.I.	T.I. vs. T.I.P.
"Gutted"	2007	Beanie Sigel	The Solution
"Syllables" {unreleased}	2007	Eminem, Dr. Dre, 50 Cent, Cashis, Stat Quo	—N/a
"Maybach Music"	2008	Rick Ross	Trilla
"Oh Girl (Remix)"	2008	Raphael Saadiq	The Way I See It
"Best Thing"	2008	Usher	Here I Stand
"Boyz (Remix)"	2008	M.I.A.	How Many Votes Fix Mix
"I Do It for Hip-Hop"	2008	Ludacris, Nas	Theater of the Mind
"Go Hard (Remix)"	2008	DJ Khaled, Kanye West, T-Pain	The Hits Collection, Volume One
"My President (Remix)" {unreleased}	2009	Young Jeezy	—N/a
"Meiplé"	2009	Robin Thicke	Sex Therapy: The Session
"Money Goes, Honey Stay (When the Money Goes) [Remix]"	2009	Fabolous	Loso's Way
"Light Up"	2010	Drake	Thank Me Later
"XXXO" (Main Mix)	2010	M.I.A.	—N/a
"Power (Remix)"	2010	Kanye West, Swizz Beatz	—N/a
"So Appalled"	2010	Kanye West, Pusha T, Cyhi the Prynce, Swizz Beatz, RZA	My Beautiful Dark Twisted Fantasy
"Free Mason"	2010	Rick Ross	Teflon Don
"The Moon & the Sky (Remix)"	2011	Sade	The Ultimate Collection
"Boongie Drop"	2011	Lenny Kravitz	Black and White America
"Mr. Nice Watch"	2011	J. Cole	Cole World: The Sideline Story
"3 Kingz"	2012	Rick Ross, Dr. Dre	God Forgives, I Don't
"Bitch, Don't Kill My Vibe" (Remix)	2013	Kendrick Lamar	Good Kid, M.A.A.D City
"High Art"	2013	The-Dream	IV Play
"Murder"	2013	Justin Timberlake	The 20/20 Experience – 2 of 2
"We Made It" (Remix)	2014	Jay Electronica	Non-album singles
"Computerized" {unreleased}	2014	Daft Punk	Non-album singles
"Moving Bass"	2014	Rick Ross	Hood Billionaire
"Talk Up"	2018	Drake	Scorpion
"What's Free"	2018	Meek Mill, Rick Ross	Championships
"The Ghost of Soulja Slim"	2020	Jay Electronica	A Written Testimony
"The Blinding"	2020	Jay Electronica, Travis Scott	A Written Testimony
"The Neverending Story"	2020	Jay Electronica	A Written Testimony
"Shiny Suit Theory"	2020	Jay Electronica, The-Dream	A Written Testimony
"Universal Soldier"	2020	Jay Electronica	A Written Testimony
"Flux Capacitor"	2020	Jay Electronica	A Written Testimony
"Ezekiel's Wheel"	2020	Jay Electronica, The-Dream	A Written Testimony
"A.P.I.D.T.A."	2020	Jay Electronica	A Written Testimony
"Sorry Not Sorry"	2021	DJ Khaled, Nas, James Fauntleroy	Khaled Khaled
"Bath Salts"	2021	DMX, Nas	Exodus
"Jail"	2021	Kanye West	Donda
"Love All"	2021	Drake	Certified Lover Boy
"Guns Go Bang"	2021	Kid Cudi	The Harder They Fall (The Motion Picture Soundtrack)
"King Kong Riddim"	2021	Jadakiss, Conway the Machine	The Harder They Fall (The Motion Picture Soundtrack)
"God Did"	2022	DJ Khaled, Rick Ross, Lil Wayne, John Legend, Fridayy	God Did
"I Want You Forever"	2024	Jeymes Samuel, D'Angelo	The Book of Clarence
"7 Minute Freestyle"	2025	Big L	Harlem's Finest: Return of the King
"God Speak (Interlude)"	2026	Eminem	The Godbody LP

== Production discography ==
List of production and non-performing songwriting credits (excluding features, interpolations, and samples)
Track(s)	Year	Credit	Artist(s)	Album
9. "Pimp or Die"	1993	Songwriter	Father MC	Various artists – Who's the Man?: Original Motion Picture Soundtrack
14. "Buggin'"	1996	Songwriter	Billy West (as "Bugs Bunny")	Various artists – Space Jam: Music From and Inspired by the Motion Picture
3. "Foxy's Bells"	1996	Songwriter	Foxy Brown	Ill Na Na
4. "Get Me Home"; (featuring Blackstreet)	1996	Songwriter	Foxy Brown	Ill Na Na
7. "If I..."	1996	Songwriter	Foxy Brown	Ill Na Na
11. "Ill Na Na"; (featuring Method Man)	1996	Songwriter	Foxy Brown	Ill Na Na
14. "Big Bad Mamma"; (featuring Dru Hill)	1996	Songwriter	Foxy Brown	Ill Na Na
4. "Round and Round"	1997	Songwriter	Mary J. Blige	Share My World
7. "Do You Know"; (featuring Kelly Price)	1997	Songwriter	Puff Daddy	No Way Out
14. "Friend"; (featuring Foxy Brown)	1997	Songwriter	Puff Daddy	No Way Out
2. "Queen of the Click"	1997	Songwriter	Queen Pen	My Melody
4. "All My Love"; (featuring Eric Williams)	1997	Songwriter	Queen Pen	My Melody
7. "It's True"	1997	Songwriter	Queen Pen	My Melody
2. "I Get It On"	1998	Songwriter	Timbaland	Tim's Bio: Life from da Bassment
4. "Hot Spot"	1999	Songwriter	Foxy Brown	Chyna Doll
6. "Job"; (featuring Mya)	1999	Songwriter	Foxy Brown	Chyna Doll
8. "I Can't"; (featuring Total)	1999	Songwriter	Foxy Brown	Chyna Doll
8. "Fake Thugs Dedication"; (featuring Redman)	1999	Songwriter	Puff Daddy	Forever
3. "Memphis Bleek Is..."	1999	Songwriter	Memphis Bleek	Coming of Age
4. "Still D.R.E."; (featuring Snoop Dogg)	1999	Songwriter	Dr. Dre	2001
—N/a	2000	Executive producer	Amil	All Money Is Legal
2. "I Got That"; (featuring Beyoncé)	2000	Songwriter	Amil	All Money Is Legal
4. "We Get Low"	2000	Songwriter	Memphis Bleek	The Understanding
6. "My Mind Right"	2000	Songwriter	Memphis Bleek	The Understanding
8. "All Types of Shit"	2000	Songwriter	Memphis Bleek	The Understanding
14. "True"; (featuring Chico DeBarge)	2001	Songwriter	Queen Pen	Conversations with Queen
5. "Indian Carpet"	2001	Songwriter	Timbaland & Magoo	Indecent Proposal
3. "Baby Boy"; (featuring Sean Paul)	2003	Songwriter	Beyoncé	Dangerously in Love
4. "Hip Hop Star"; (featuring Big Boi and Sleepy Brown)	2003	Songwriter	Beyoncé	Dangerously in Love
7. "Yes"	2003	Songwriter	Beyoncé	Dangerously in Love
5. "Threat"	2003	Producer (with 9th Wonder)	Jay-Z	The Black Album
1. "Lose My Breath"	2004	Songwriter	Destiny's Child	Destiny Fulfilled
6. "I Ain't Heard of That (Remix)"; (featuring Bun B)	2005	Songwriter	Slim Thug	Already Platinum
"Come Fly with Me" (featuring Sizzla)	2005	Songwriter	Foxy Brown	Black Roses
2. "Enough Cryin"	2005	Songwriter	Mary J. Blige	The Breakthrough
—N/a	2005	Executive producer	Fort Minor	The Rising Tied
5. "Best Dress"; (featuring Jamie Foxx)	2006	Songwriter	LL Cool J	Todd Smith
—N/a	2006	Executive producer	N.O.R.E.	N.O.R.E. y la Familia...Ya Tú Sabe
6. "Kitty Kat"	2006	Songwriter	Beyoncé	B'Day
—N/a	2006	Executive producer	Lupe Fiasco	Lupe Fiasco's Food & Liquor
9. "Lemme Get That"	2007	Songwriter	Rihanna	Good Girl Gone Bad
11. "Question Existing"	2007	Songwriter	Rihanna	Good Girl Gone Bad
5. "Coming Home"; (featuring Skylar Grey)	2010	Producer (with Alex da Kid)	Diddy – Dirty Money	Last Train to Paris
13. "The Weed Iz Mine"; (featuring Wiz Khalifa)	2011	Mixing engineer	Snoop Dogg	Doggumentary
2. "The Story of O.J."	2017	Co-producer (with No I.D.)	Jay-Z	4:44
3. "Smile"; (featuring Gloria Carter)	2017	Co-producer (with No I.D.)	Jay-Z	4:44
4. "Caught In Their Eyes"; (featuring Frank Ocean)	2017	Co-producer (with No I.D.)	Jay-Z	4:44
8. "Moonlight"	2017	Co-producer (with No I.D.)	Jay-Z	4:44
10. "Legacy"	2017	Co-producer (with No I.D.)	Jay-Z	4:44
12. "Blue's Freestyle / We Family"	2017	Co-producer (with No I.D.)	Jay-Z	4:44
—N/a	2018	Executive producer	Vic Mensa	The Autobiography
15. "Brown Skin Girl"; (featuring Blue Ivy Carter)	2019	Songwriter	Beyoncé, Saint Jhn, Wizkid	Various artists – The Lion King: The Gift
—N/a	2020	Executive producer	Jay Electronica	A Written Testimony
2. "Ghost of Soulja Slim"	2020	Additional vocals, songwriter	Jay Electronica	A Written Testimony
3. "The Blinding"; (featuring Travis Scott)	2020	Additional vocals, songwriter	Jay Electronica	A Written Testimony
15. "Black Parade"	2020	Songwriter	Beyoncé	Various artists – The Lion King: The Gift (Deluxe)
"Savage (Remix)"	2020	Songwriter	Megan Thee Stallion, Beyoncé	Non-album single
4. "One Way Flight"; (featuring Freddie Gibbs)	2020	Arranger	Benny the Butcher	Burden of Proof
3. "The Harder They Fall"	2022	Songwriter	Koffee	Various artists – The Harder They Fall (soundtrack)
3. "Alien Superstar"	2022	Songwriter	Beyoncé	Renaissance
6. "Break My Soul"	2022	Songwriter	Beyoncé	Renaissance
14. "America Has a Problem"	2022	Songwriter	Beyoncé	Renaissance
2. "This Shit Right Here"; (featuring Lil Wayne)	2023	Additional vocals, songwriter	Swizz Beatz	Hip Hop 50
1. "Ameriican Requiem"	2024	Songwriter	Beyoncé	Cowboy Carter
11. "Daughter"	2024	Songwriter	Beyoncé	Cowboy Carter
12. "Spaghettii"; (with Linda Martell and Shaboozey)	2024	Songwriter	Beyoncé	Cowboy Carter
17. "Levii's Jeans"; (with Post Malone)	2024	Songwriter	Beyoncé	Cowboy Carter
20. "Ya Ya"	2024	Songwriter	Beyoncé	Cowboy Carter
26. "Sweet / Honey / Buckiin'"; (with Shaboozey)	2024	Songwriter	Beyoncé	Cowboy Carter
3. "We Pray"; (featuring Burna Boy, Little Simz, Elyanna and Tini)	2024	Songwriter	Coldplay	Moon Music

== See also ==
- Jay-Z albums discography
- The Carters
