= List of Billboard number-one R&B albums of 2000 =

These are the Billboard Top R&B/Hip-Hop Albums that peaked at number-one in 2000.

== Chart history ==
Issue date	Album	Artist	Ref
January 1	Tha G-Code	Juvenile	
January 8	...And Then There Was X	DMX	
January 15	Vol. 3... Life and Times of S. Carter	Jay-Z	
January 22	Vol. 3... Life and Times of S. Carter	Jay-Z	
January 29	...And Then There Was X	DMX	
February 5	J.E. Heartbreak	Jagged Edge	
February 12	Voodoo	D'Angelo	
February 19	Voodoo	D'Angelo	
February 26	Voodoo	D'Angelo	
March 4	Voodoo	D'Angelo	
March 11	2001	Dr. Dre	
March 18	BTNHResurrection	Bone Thugs-n-Harmony	
March 25	Life Story	Black Rob	
April 1	Life Story	Black Rob	
April 8	War & Peace Vol. 2 (The Peace Disc)	Ice Cube	
April 15	Romeo Must Die: The Album	Soundtrack / Various artists	
April 22	Yeeeah Baby	Big Pun	
April 29	Unrestricted	Da Brat	
May 6	My Name Is Joe	Joe	
May 13	The Heat	Toni Braxton	
May 20	Goodfellas	504 Boyz	
May 27	Goodfellas	504 Boyz	
June 3	I Got That Work	Big Tymers	
June 10	The Marshall Mathers LP	Eminem	
June 17	The Marshall Mathers LP	Eminem	
June 24	The Marshall Mathers LP	Eminem	
July 1	The Marshall Mathers LP	Eminem	
July 8	Anarchy	Busta Rhymes	
July 15	The Notorious K.I.M.	Lil' Kim	
July 22	Ryde or Die Vol. 2	Ruff Ryders	
July 29	Nutty Professor II: The Klumps	Soundtrack / Various artists	
August 5	Country Grammar	Nelly	
August 12	Country Grammar	Nelly	
August 19	Country Grammar	Nelly	
August 26	Country Grammar	Nelly	
September 2	Country Grammar	Nelly	
September 9	Country Grammar	Nelly	
September 16	DJ Clue? Presents Backstage: A Hard Knock Life	DJ Clue?	
September 23	Trapped in Crime	C-Murder	
September 30	G.O.A.T.	LL Cool J	
October 7	G.O.A.T.	LL Cool J	
October 14	Let's Get Ready	Mystikal	
October 21	Let's Get Ready	Mystikal	
October 28	Rule 3:36	Ja Rule	
November 4	Rule 3:36	Ja Rule	
November 11	Rule 3:36	Ja Rule	
November 18	The Dynasty: Roc La Familia	Jay-Z	
November 25	TP-2.com	R. Kelly	
December 2	TP-2.com	R. Kelly	
December 9	The W	Wu-Tang Clan	
December 16	TP-2.com	R. Kelly	
December 23	The Understanding	Memphis Bleek	
December 30	Restless	Xzibit	

== See also ==
- 2000 in music
- List of number-one R&B singles of 2000 (U.S.)
