= Round Here (Memphis Bleek song) =

Single by Memphis Bleek featuring Trick Daddy and T.I.

from the album M.A.D.E.
- Released: October 12, 2003
- Recorded: 2003
- Genre: Hip hop
- Length: 5:09
- Label: Get Low; Roc-A-Fella; Def Jam
- Songwriters: Cox, M.; Young, M.; Harris, C.; Smith, J.
- Producer: Just Blaze

Memphis Bleek singles chronology
"Do My..." (2001)	"Round Here" (2003)	"Need Me In Your Life" (2003)

Trick Daddy singles chronology
"Still Ballin'" (2003)	"Round Here" (2003)	"What's Happenin!" (2004)

T.I. singles chronology
"Be Easy" (2003)	"Round Here" (2003)	"Rubber Band Man" (2003)

"Round Here" is a song by American rapper Memphis Bleek, released as the first single from his third studio album, M.A.D.E. (2003). Produced by Just Blaze, the song features fellow American rappers Trick Daddy and T.I. It peaked at number 53 on the Billboard Hot R&B/Hip-Hop Songs chart.

== Song info and music video ==
The song's theme is to show that no matter where you are from everyone who lives in the hood has to struggle.

Memphis Bleek:

Put in game down here, make change down here
Cause I serve them fiends, that raw 'caine down here

T.I.:

You say the wrong thang, get ya back blown round here
Cause gangsta's rep they hood, by the zone round here

In the music video, each rapper portrays the gritty life in their low income neighborhoods they grew up in throughout a single day. Memphis Bleek rapping in some public housing apartments behind him in Brooklyn in the early morning, Trick Daddy raps in front of some low cost apartments, run down houses and stores in Miami in the afternoon/mid-day, and T.I. raps on the front lawn of a house in a low income neighborhood in Atlanta in the evening/dusk. The video features cameos by fellow East Coast rapper Jay-Z, a then-unknown Rick Ross and Pitbull.

The official remix, the "Dirty South Remix", features T.I., B.G., and Big Kuntry King.

== Charts ==
Chart (2004)	Peak position
US Hot R&B/Hip-Hop Songs (Billboard)	53
