= Backstage: Music Inspired by the Film =

Soundtrack album by DJ Clue?
- Released: August 29, 2000
- Recorded: 1999–2000
- Studios: The Hit Factory (New York, NY); Manhattan Center (New York, NY); Soundtrack Recording Studios (New York, NY); Baseline Studios (New York, NY); Sony Music Studios (New York, NY); The Enterprise (Burbank, CA); Lamp City; Cash Money Studios (New Orleans, LA); Doppler Studios; PatchWerk Recording Studios (Atlanta, GA); Stankonia Recording (Atlanta, GA); Mirror Image Recorders (New York, NY); Right Track Recording (New York, NY); Criteria Recording Studios (Miami, FL); Unique Recording Studios (New York, NY)
- Genres: Hip hop; R&B
- Length: 1:14:15
- Labels: Desert Storm; Roc-A-Fella; Def Jam; Dimension
- Producers: Shawn Carter (exec.); Damon Dash (exec.); Kareem "Biggs" Burke (exec.); DJ Clue (also co-exec.); DURO (also co-exec.); Alchemist; Anthony Dent; Brycyn Evans; Christión; DJ Twinz; DL; Earthtone III; EK; Fan Taz; Irv Gotti; Livin' Proof; Mannie Fresh; Poke & Tone; Precison; Redman; Robert "Shim" Kirkland; Scott Storch; Swizz Beatz; Timbaland; Troy Johnson; Warrior

DJ Clue? chronology
The Professional (1998)	Backstage: Music Inspired by the Film (2000)	The Professional 2 (2001)

Singles from Backstage: Music Inspired by the Film
- 1. "My Mind Right" Released: March 5, 2000; 2. "Best of Me, Part 2" Released: August 29, 2000; 3. "Keep It Thoro" Released: 2000

Professional ratings
Review scores
Source	Rating
AllMusic	3/5 stars
Entertainment Weekly	A−
RapReviews	6/10
Voir	3.5/5 stars

Backstage: Music Inspired by the Film is the soundtrack to the Chris Fiore's 2000 documentary film Backstage. Originally scheduled for a Fall 1999 release, it was then delayed to a January 11, 2000 release. The album was ultimately released on August 29, 2000 by Def Jam Recordings, Jay-Z's Roc-A-Fella Records, and DJ Clue's Desert Storm Records.

Recording sessions took place at The Hit Factory, at Manhattan Center, at Soundtrack Recording Studios, at Baseline Studios, at Sony Music Studios, at Mirror Image Recorders, at Right Track Recording and at Unique Recording Studios in New York City, at the Enterprise in Burbank, at Cash Money Studios in New Orleans, at PatchWerk Recording Studios and at Stankonia Recording in Atlanta, at Criteria Studios in Miami, at Lamp City, and at Doppler Studios.

Production was handled by several record producers, including Alchemist, Earthtone III, Irv Gotti, Ken "Duro" Ifill, Mannie Fresh, Poke & Tone, Redman, Scott Storch, Swizz Beatz, Timbaland and DJ Clue.

It features contributions from Jay-Z, Ja Rule, Memphis Bleek, Amil, Big Tymers, Cam'ron, Capone-N-Noreaga, Christión, Da Brat, Da Ranjahz, Eve, Fabolous Sport, Hot Boys, Juelz Santana, Killer Mike, Lady Luck, Lil' Cease, Mýa, Outkast, Prodigy, Redman, Rell, Slimm Calhoun, T-Boz and The Lox.

The mixtape was a commercial success, peaking at number six on the Billboard 200 and topping the R&B/Hip-Hop Albums chart at number 1. It was certified gold by the Recording Industry Association of America on December 4, 2000 for sales of over 500,000 copies.

There were four singles released from the project: Mýa & Jay-Z's "Best of Me, Part 2" with music video directed by Hype Williams, Beanie Sigel's "In the Club" with music video directed by Jeremy Rall, Prodigy's "Keep it Thoro" with music video directed by Diane Martel, and Memphis Bleek's "My Mind Right" with music video directed by Nzingha Stewart.

== Track listing ==
No.	Title	Writer(s)	Producer(s)	Length
1.	"Intro"			2:55
2.	"Best of Me, Part 2" (performed by Mýa and Jay-Z)	Shawn Carter; Jean-Claude Olivier; Samuel Barnes; Larry Gates; Mýa Harrison; Marcel Hall; Marlon Williams; Teron Beal	Poke & Tone; Precison	3:41
3.	"In the Club" (performed by Beanie Sigel)	Dwight Grant; Timothy Mosley	Timbaland	4:22
4.	"Keep It Thoro" (performed by Prodigy)	Albert Johnson; Alan Maman	Alchemist	2:47
5.	"My Mind Right" (performed by Memphis Bleek)	Malik Cox; Raymond Grant; Richard Grant; Lalo Schifrin	DJ Twinz	3:45
6.	"Who Did You Expect?" (performed by The Lox)	Davis Styles; Jason Phillips; Sean Jacobs; Kasseem Dean	Swizz Beatz	4:19
7.	"Wanna Take Me Back" (performed by T-Boz)	Tionne Watkins; Brycyn Evans; Troy Johnson	Brycyn Evans; Troy Johnson	4:00
8.	"Just Leave Your Love" (performed by Christión)	Allen Anthony Richardson; Kenny Ski; Christopher Warrior	Christión; Warrior	4:01
9.	"Darlin'" (performed by Rell)	Gerrell Gaddis; Peter White	EK	4:00
10.	"Millionaire" (performed by Hot Boys and Big Tymers)	Terius Grey; Dwayne Carter; Tab Virgil Jr.; Bryan Williams; Christopher Dorsey; Byron Thomas	Mannie Fresh	3:51
11.	"Road Dawgs" (performed by Amil, Eve, Da Brat and Jay-Z)	Amil Whitehead; Eve Jeffers; Shawn Carter; Anthony Dent	Anthony Dent	4:52
12.	"Funkanella" (performed by Outkast, Slimm Calhoun and Killer Mike)	Andre Benjamin; Antwan Patton; Michael Render; Brian Loving; David Sheats	Earthtone III	4:06
13.	"Come and Get It" (performed by Redman and Lady Luck)	Shanell Jones; Reggie Noble	Redman	3:34
14.	"Hate Music" (performed by Cam'ron and Juelz Santana)	Cameron Giles; LaRon James; Franklin Crum	Livin' Proof	3:55
15.	"Gotta Be a Thug" (performed by Fabolous Sport)	John D. Jackson; Ernesto Shaw; Ken "DURO" Ifill	DJ Clue; DURO	4:15
16.	"Don't Want Beef" (performed by Capone-N-Noreaga)	Victor Santiago; Kiam Holley; Scott Storch	Scott Storch	3:59
17.	"Crime Life" (performed by Memphis Bleek, Lil' Cease and Ja Rule)	Malik Cox; Jeffery Atkins; James Lloyd; Irving Lorenzo; Larry Ogletree	DL; Irv Gotti	3:58
18.	"Say What U Say" (performed by Da Ranjahz and Ja Rule)	Malcolm Byer; Nigel Laguerre; Eric Johnson	Fan Taz	4:11
19.	"People's Court" (performed by Jay-Z)	Shawn Carter; Robert Kirkland; Alan Tew	Robert "Shim" Kirkland	3:29
Total length:				1:14:15

Sample credits

- Track 2 contains excerpts from "Make the Music with Your Mouth, Biz", written by Marcel Theo Hall and Marlon Williams, and performed by Biz Markie
- Track 5 contains an interpolation from "The Monk", written and performed by Lalo Schifrin
- Track 9 contains a sample of "Lullaby", performed by Peter White
- Track 19 contains samples from "The Big One (There from The People's Court)", written by Alan Tew

== Charts ==
=== Weekly charts ===
Chart (2000)	Peak position
US Billboard 200	6
US Top R&B/Hip-Hop Albums (Billboard)	1

=== Year-end charts ===
Chart (2000)	Position
US Top R&B/Hip-Hop Albums (Billboard)	80

== Certifications ==
Region	Certification	Certified units/sales
United States (RIAA)	Gold	500,000^{^}
^{^} Shipments figures based on certification alone.

== See also ==
- List of Billboard number-one R&B albums of 2000
