= I Just Wanna Love U (Give It 2 Me) =

2000 single by Jay-Z

Single by Jay-Z

from the album The Dynasty: Roc La Familia
- Released: October 17, 2000
- Recorded: 2000
- Studio: Baseline Studios (New York City)
- Genre: East Coast hip-hop; R&B
- Length: 3:47
- Label: Roc-A-Fella; Def Jam
- Songwriters: Shawn Carter; Pharrell Williams; Charles Hugo; Rick James; Christopher Wallace; Sean Combs; Todd Shaw; Mason Betha; Deric Angelettie; Kitt Walker; Clifford Smith; Osten Harvey; Asha Puthli; Michael Flowers; Carl Thomas
- Producer: The Neptunes

Jay-Z singles chronology
"Is That Your Chick (The Lost Verses)" (2000)	"I Just Wanna Love U (Give It 2 Me)" (2000)	"Change the Game" (2001)

Music video
- "I Just Wanna Love U (Give It 2 Me)" on YouTube

"I Just Wanna Love U (Give It 2 Me)" is a song by American rapper Jay-Z, released as the first single from his 2000 album The Dynasty: Roc La Familia. It was produced by the Neptunes and features a chorus performed by Neptunes member Pharrell and Pennsylvania rapper Omillio Sparks, both of whom were uncredited. The video for the song, directed by David Meyers, features cameos from Lil' Kim, Lil' Cease, Damon Dash, Beanie Sigel, Memphis Bleek, Jermaine Dupri and John Witherspoon.

Janet Jackson included the song in a dance breakdown during "Nasty" on her All for You Tour. The song was also featured during Coldplay's Viva tour as pre-show music, a reference due to Jay-Z's feature on the track "Lost!". Beyoncé also included the song in the "Crazy in Love" breakdown on her I Am World Tour.

Jay-Z's first verse interpolates the Notorious B.I.G.'s song "The World Is Filled..." from the album Life After Death, as well as an interpolation from "I Wish" by Carl Thomas. The chorus of the song is interpolated from "Give It to Me Baby" by Rick James.

In 2024, the song appeared on Pharrell's soundtrack album for the film Piece by Piece.

On July 14, 2025, during Beyonce’s Cowboy Carter Tour, Jay-Z played this song as part of a special guest appearance at the fourth of four shows at Mercedes-Benz Stadium.

== Reception ==
During a spot on Bill Maher's talk show, Jay-Z revealed the song was based on a true story, about real life events that occurred during a Mary J. Blige afterparty. AllMusic's Steve Birchmeier considers "I Just Wanna Love U" to be "a fun, playful song miles away from the rugged Ruff Ryder beats Swizz Beatz had been offering Jay-Z a year earlier." In addition, Rob Marriott of Rolling Stone and Steve Juon of RapReviews.com describe it as a club-ready track that will get "whips hopping from coast to coast.". The single eventually became the first Jay-Z single to reach number one on the Hip-Hop/R&B chart. The song was voted number one by Complex for their Best Songs of the Decade list. The song peaked at number 11 on the Billboard Hot 100, number one on the Billboard Hot R&B/Hip-Hop Songs chart, number 3 on Billboard's Hot Rap Songs chart, and number 17 on the UK Singles Chart.

Britney Spears said she was inspired by Jay-Z and "I Just Wanna Love U (Give It 2 Me)" to work with the song's producers the Neptunes for her album Britney, saying "for this album I was really inspired by Jay-Z and the Neptunes, those were the two people I really listened to." Spears' single "I'm a Slave 4 U", released the following year, was produced by the Neptunes and became a defining hit in her career.

== Formats and track listings ==
=== CD ===
1. "I Just Wanna Love U (Radio Edit)" (3:50)
2. "Parking Lot Pimpin" (4:15)
3. "Hey Papi (Clean)" (4:27)
4. "I Just Wanna Love U (Give It to Me) (Video)"

=== Vinyl ===
==== A-Side ====
1. "I Just Wanna Love U (Give It 2 Me) (Radio Edit)"
2. "I Just Wanna Love U (Give It 2 Me) (LP Version)"
3. "I Just Wanna Love U (Give It 2 Me) (Instrumental)"

==== B-Side ====
1. "Parking Lot Pimpin' (Radio Edit)"
2. "Parking Lot Pimpin' (LP Version)"
3. "Parking Lot Pimpin' (Instrumental)"

== Charts ==
=== Weekly charts ===
Chart (2000–2001)	Peak position
France (SNEP)	76
Germany (GfK)	75
Netherlands (Dutch Top 40 Tipparade)	5
Netherlands (Single Top 100)	61
New Zealand (Recorded Music NZ)	31
Norway (VG-lista)	15
Scottish Singles Sales (Official Charts)	40
Switzerland (Schweizer Hitparade)	86
UK Singles (Official Charts)	17
UK Hip Hop/R&B (Official Charts)	6
US Billboard Hot 100	11
US Hot R&B/Hip-Hop Songs (Billboard)	1
US Hot Rap Songs (Billboard)	4
US Rhythmic Airplay (Billboard)	5

=== Year-end charts ===
Chart (2001)	Position
US Billboard Hot 100	56
US Hot R&B/Hip-Hop Songs (Billboard)	23

== Certifications ==
Region	Certification	Certified units/sales
United Kingdom (BPI)	Silver	200,000^{‡}
United States (RIAA)	Platinum	1,000,000^{‡}
^{*} Sales figures based on certification alone.^{^} Shipments figures based on certification alone.

== See also ==
- List of songs recorded by Jay-Z
