= Backstage (2000 film) =

- Directed by: Chris Fiore
- Written by: James Hunter; Michael Raffanello
- Produced by: Damon Dash
- Starring: Jay-Z; DMX; Method Man; Redman; Beanie Sigel; Memphis Bleek; Ja Rule; DJ Clue; Amil
- Cinematography: Mark Petersson; Lenny Santiago; Elena Sorre
- Edited by: Chris Fiore; Richard Calderon
- Music by: DJ Clue
- Distributed by: Dimension Films
- Release date: September 8, 2000
- Running time: 86 minutes
- Country: United States
- Language: English

Backstage is a 2000 American documentary film directed by Chris Fiore, chronicling the 1999 Hard Knock Life Tour that featured several of hip hops top acts including Jay-Z, DMX, Method Man and Redman. Produced by Damon Dash, Backstage featured live performances by several members of Def Jam's roster and gave an in-depth look at what happened backstage. Originally scheduled for a Fall 1999 release, the film was ultimately released on September 8, 2000.

== Cast ==
=== Main cast ===
- Jay-Z
- DMX
- Method Man
- Redman
- Beanie Sigel
- Ja Rule
- Memphis Bleek
- DJ Clue?
- Amil

=== Additional cast ===
- Damon Dash
- Jeremy Dash
- DJ Scratch
- Eve
- Swizz Beatz
- Pain in da Ass
- Chuck D
- Busta Rhymes
- Sean "Puffy" Combs
- Mathematics
- Ed Lover
- Russell Simmons
- Kevin Liles
- Lyor Cohen
- DJ Twinz

== Reception ==
On the review aggregator website Rotten Tomatoes, 31% of 13 critics' reviews are positive.

== Soundtrack ==
Year	Title	Chart positions		Certifications (sales thresholds)
Year	Title	U.S.	U.S. R&B	Certifications (sales thresholds)
2000	Backstage: A Hard Knock Life: Released: August 29, 2000; Label: Roc-A-Fella / Def Jam	6	1	US: Gold
