= Chris Fiore =

American film director

Chris Fiore is a U.S. film writer, director, and producer.

== Career ==
He wrote the recently optioned The Utopia Virus, an original feature-length screenplay set in New York City's dystopian streets in the near future. He is currently in post-production on a new documentary called Mockstar. Fiore worked on the Emmy Award-winning NYC Soundtracks and wrote, produced, and directed a documentary, "Paramore: Born for This", about the headlining act of Warped Tour, Paramore, which aired on the Fuse channel.

Fiore's other credits include the feature film documentary Backstage, which he directed for Miramax/Dimension. The documentary chronicled behind-the-scenes drama as well as performances on Jay Z’s Hard Knock Life Tour. Featuring rappers such as Jay Z, DMX, Eve, Method Man, Redman, Beanie Sigel, Ja Rule, Memphis Bleek, and DJ Clue, the film enjoyed a profitable theatrical run in 2000. Trip and Go Naked, another feature documentary produced and directed by Fiore, starred the infamous Mistress Otter and her troupe of deviant performance artists. The documentary was shot at New York’s Pyramid Club and won the 2004 Excellence in Sexual Theater Grocery at the independent Arlene's Grocery Film Festival. Trip was also an Official Selection at the 2004 Coney Island Film Festival. The Occupation of New York: RNC 2004, a short film documenting several protests surrounding the Republican National Convention at New York’s Madison Square Garden, was produced and directed by Fiore through his company, Parallel Universe, and was an Official Selection of the 2006 E.Vil City Film Festival, New York City’s premiere Lower East Side event.

Other producing and directing credits include Cloudless, the film version of choreographer Susan Marshall’s 2006 Bessie Award winning cycle of dance performances, as well as Susan Marshall: 20 Years of Collaboration, a short film commissioned by New York’s Dance Theater Workshop, celebrating two decades of work by the MacArthur Genius Award winning choreographer.

Fiore also associate produced and wrote three episodes of Dead Tenants for the Learning Channel, which chronicled the adventures of the Preternatural Research Society. Other television work includes "The Takeover", a reality pilot based on the day-to-day life of hip hop mogul Damon Dash, which Fiore produced and co-directed with Dash for Roc-a-fella Films. Bizarre World, co-produced with Ted Haimes for Rocket Science Labs, ran as two prime-time specials for the Fox Network. He also directed Victoria's Secret: Christmas Dreams and Fantasies, which documented the creation of the household name's holiday catalog. Fiore has also worked with Timothy Leary, Ted Nelson, Rudy Rucker and others on the Hypertour 89 project, his documentary on the then nascent media revolution focusing on CD-ROM, information networks, and virtual reality.
