= Change the Game =

2001 single by Jay-Z, Memphis Bleek, Beanie Sigel, Static Major

Single by Jay-Z featuring Beanie Sigel, Memphis Bleek and Static Major

from the album The Dynasty: Roc La Familia
- Released: January 9, 2001
- Recorded: July 2000
- Genre: East Coast hip hop
- Length: 3:07
- Label: Roc-A-Fella; Def Jam
- Songwriters: Shawn Carter; Dwight Grant; Malik Cox; Ricardo Thomas; Stephen Garrett
- Producer: Rick Rock

Jay-Z singles chronology
"I Just Wanna Love U (Give It 2 Me)" (2000)	"Change the Game" (2001)	"Do My..." (2001)

Beanie Sigel singles chronology
"My Mind Right" (2000)	"Change the Game" (2001)	"Beanie (Mack Bitch)" (2001)

Memphis Bleek singles chronology
"Is That Your Chick (The Lost Verses)" (2000)	"Change the Game" (2001)	"Do My..." (2001)

Music video
- "Change the Game" on YouTube

"Change the Game" is the second single from rapper Jay-Z from his 2000 album The Dynasty: Roc La Familia. It features guest raps by Memphis Bleek and Beanie Sigel, production from Rick Rock and backing vocals by Static Major. Upon release, the song's intention was to promote Sigel and Bleek, but Steve Juon of RapReviews.com considers Jay-Z to outperform both rappers. A music video directed by David Meyers was made for "Change the Game."

== Remix ==
A remix to "Change the Game" features Bleek and Sigel, along with Tha Dogg Pound members Daz and Kurupt. The remix appears on The Professional 2 album by DJ Clue. It can also be found on Tha Dogg Pound compilation album 2002.

== Critical reception ==
Rap Reviews wrote "Even though Beans and Memph both have raps on this song, Jay starts and ends the track with the best flow and lyrics throughout."

== Formats and track listings ==
=== CD ===
1. "Change the Game (Radio Edit)" (3:40)
2. "Change the Game (Instrumental)" (3:40)

=== Vinyl ===
==== A-Side ====
1. "Change the Game (Radio Edit)" (3:07)
2. "Change the Game (LP Version)" (3:08)
3. "Change the Game (Instrumental)" (3:05)

==== B-Side ====
1. "You, Me, Him and Her (Radio Edit)" (3:46)
2. "You, Me, Him and Her (LP Version)" (3:46)
3. "You, Me, Him and Her (Instrumental)" (3:43)

== Charts ==
Chart (2001)	Peak position
US Billboard Hot 100	86
US Hot R&B/Hip-Hop Songs (Billboard)	29
US Hot Rap Songs (Billboard)	10

== Release history ==
Region	Date	Format(s)	Label(s)	Ref.
United States	February 6, 2001	Rhythmic contemporary · urban contemporary radio	Roc-A-Fella, IDJMG	

== See also ==
- List of songs recorded by Jay-Z
