= Do My... =

2001 song performed by Memphis Bleek

Single by Memphis Bleek featuring Jay-Z

from the album The Understanding
- Released: February 13, 2001
- Recorded: 2000
- Genre: Hip hop
- Label: Get Low; Roc-A-Fella; Def Jam
- Songwriters: M. Cox; Shawn Carter; P. Lawrence
- Producer: A Kid Called Roots

Memphis Bleek singles chronology
"Change the Game" (2000)	"Do My..." (2001)	"Round Here" (2003)

Jay-Z singles chronology
"Change the Game" (2001)	"Do My..." (2001)	"Guilty Until Proven Innocent" (2001)

"Do My..." is a song by American rapper Memphis Bleek, released as the third and final single from his second studio album The Understanding (2000). The song features vocals from fellow rapper Jay-Z, with production handled by Patrick "A Kid Called Roots" Lawrence. It peaked at number 68 on the US Hot R&B/Hip-Hop Songs chart.

== Charts ==
Chart (2001)	Peak position
US Hot R&B/Hip-Hop Songs (Billboard)	68
US Hot Rap Songs (Billboard)	24

== Release history ==
Region	Date	Format(s)	Label(s)	Ref.
United States	April 3, 2001	Urban contemporary radio	Roc-A-Fella, IDJMG	
