= My Mind Right =

2000 single Memphis Bleek

Single by Memphis Bleek

from the album Backstage: Music Inspired by the Film and The Understanding
- Released: March 5, 2000
- Recorded: 1999
- Genre: Hip hop
- Label: Roc-A-Fella; Def Jam
- Songwriters: Malik Cox; Raymond Grant; Richard Grant; Lalo Schifrin
- Producer: DJ Twinz

Memphis Bleek singles chronology
| "What You Think of That" (1999) | "My Mind Right" (2000) | "Is That Your Chick (The Lost Verses)" (2000) |

Jay-Z singles chronology
| "Anything" (2000) | "My Mind Right (Remix)" (2000) | "Big Pimpin'" (2000) |

Beanie Sigel singles chronology
| "Do It Again (Put Ya Hands Up)" (1999) | "My Mind Right (Remix)" (2000) | "Change the Game" (2000) |

"My Mind Right" is a song by American rapper Memphis Bleek, released by Roc-A-Fella Records and Def Jam Recordings on March 5, 2000, as the lead single from his second studio album, The Understanding (2000). It also served as the lead single for Roc-A-Fella Records' soundtrack album, Backstage: A Hard Knock Life.

The music video, directed by Nzingha Stewart, features cameo appearances from Jay-Z and Damon Dash, as well as fellow East Coast rappers Caddillac Tah, Ja Rule and Fabolous. Initially, the song was not a major hit and did not receive much airplay; however, following its remix with Roc-A-Fella label boss Jay-Z and labelmate Beanie Sigel, the song received wider radio airplay throughout the summer of 2000.

== Charts ==
| Chart (2000) | Peak position |
|---|---|
| US Hot R&B/Hip-Hop Songs (Billboard) | 85 |
