= Memphis Bleek Is... =

Single by Memphis Bleek

from the album Coming of Age
- Released: June 8, 1999
- Studio: Soundtracks Studio (New York City)
- Genre: Hip hop
- Label: Def Jam; Roc-A-Fella
- Songwriters: M. Cox; K. Dean
- Producer: Swizz Beatz

Memphis Bleek singles chronology
"More Money, More Cash, More Hoes (Remix)" (1998)	"Memphis Bleek Is..." (1999)	"My Hood To Your Hood" (1999)

Music video
- "Memphis Bleek Is…" on YouTube

"Memphis Bleek Is..." is the debut single from Memphis Bleek, it was from his first album, Coming of Age. The song was perceived as an indirect diss to Nas. It was considered a Nas diss because the song had a similar concept to that of Nas' song, "Nas Is Like." The song became a minor hit and allowed Bleek to be known as more than Jay-Z's sidekick.

== Charts ==
Chart (2000)	Peak position
US Hot R&B/Hip-Hop Songs (Billboard)	93
US Hot Rap Songs (Billboard)	33
