= Is That Your Chick (The Lost Verses) =

2000 single by Memphis Bleek featuring Jay-Z and Missy Elliott

Single by Memphis Bleek featuring Jay-Z and Missy Elliott

from the album The Understanding and Vol. 3... Life and Times of S. Carter (European version)
- Released: September 12, 2000
- Recorded: 1999–2000
- Genre: Hip-hop; dirty rap
- Length: 4:54
- Label: Get Low; Roc-A-Fella; Def Jam
- Songwriters: Malik Cox; Shawn Carter; Carl Mitchell; Melissa Elliott; Timothy Mosley
- Producer: Timbaland

Memphis Bleek singles chronology
"My Mind Right" (2000)	"Is That Your Chick (The Lost Verses)" (2000)	"Change the Game" (2001)

Missy Elliott singles chronology
"Take That" (2000)	"Is That Your Chick (The Lost Verses)" (2000)	"Get Ur Freak On" (2001)

Jay-Z singles chronology
"Best of Me, Part 2" (2000)	"Is That Your Chick (The Lost Verses)" (2000)	"I Just Wanna Love U (Give It 2 Me)" (2000)

Music video
- "Is That Your Chick (The Lost Verses)" on YouTube

"Is That Your Chick (The Lost Verses)" is the second single from Memphis Bleek's second album, The Understanding. The single version featured Jay-Z and Missy "Misdemeanor" Elliott. The album version featured a verse from Twista and another verse from Jay-Z. The song was produced by Timbaland and was released in 2000. The original version of the song appeared on the European (but not American) version of Jay-Z's Vol. 3...Life and Times of S. Carter. Memphis Bleek later recorded verses for the song, and it was released as the second single from Bleek's The Understanding. In the alternate version the chorus is changed from "Cause that's Jay and them..." to "Cause that's Bleek and them...".

The song is also noted to be Bleek's last song to chart officially on Billboard Hot 100.

== Music video ==
The official music video for the song was directed by Chris Robinson. The video version of the song is condensed to Bleek's 2 verses & 1 Jay-Z verse. Twista does not appear in the video.

== Charts ==
=== Weekly charts ===
Chart (2000–2001)	Peak position
US Billboard Hot 100	68
US Hot R&B/Hip-Hop Songs (Billboard)	18
US Hot Rap Songs (Billboard)	7

=== Year-end charts ===
Chart (2001)	Position
US Hot R&B/Hip-Hop Songs (Billboard)	73
