= Dear Summer =

Single by Jay-Z

from the album 534
- Released: June 1, 2005
- Recorded: 2005
- Genre: Hip hop
- Label: Get Low; Roc-A-Fella; Def Jam
- Songwriters: Shawn Carter; Justin G. Smith; Don Blackman
- Producer: Just Blaze

Memphis Bleek singles chronology
"Infatuated" (2005)	"Dear Summer" (2005)	"Still Ill" (2010)

Jay-Z singles chronology
"Numb/Encore" (2004)	"Dear Summer" (2005)	"Go Crazy" (2005)

"Dear Summer" is the third and final single from American rapper Memphis Bleek's fourth studio album, 534. Despite being featured on Bleek's album and released as a single, the song does not feature any vocals from Memphis Bleek. He is also not listed as a writer. It is solely performed by the featured guest, Jay-Z. Produced by Just Blaze, it contains a sample from Weldon Irvine's "Morning Sunrise". It is notable for being the first solo Jay-Z song to be released following his retirement from music in 2003.

The song peaked at number 30 on the Hot R&B/Hip-Hop Songs chart.
