= The Professional 2 =

Studio album by DJ Clue?
- Released: February 27, 2001
- Studios: Right Track Studios (New York, NY); McClair Digital Studios (Canada); Black Friday Recording Studio (Philadelphia, PA); Soundtrack Studios (New York, NY); Enterprise Studios (Los Angeles, CA); Larrabee West Studios (Los Angeles, CA); Baseline Studios (New York, NY); 4 Stars Recording Studios (Florida); The Hit Factory (New York, NY); Desert Storms Studios (New York, NY); Mirror Image Studios
- Genres: East Coast hip hop; hardcore hip hop
- Length: 1:11:23
- Labels: Island Def Jam; Desert Storm; Roc-A-Fella
- Producers: Shawn Carter (exec.); Damon Dash (exec.); Kareem "Biggs" Burke (exec.); Skane (co-exec.); DJ Clue? (also co-exec.); DURO (also co-exec.); Bernard "Big Demi" Parker; Charly "Suga Bear" Charles; DJ Twinz; Just Blaze; Rashad Smith; Rick Rock; Righteous Funk Boogie; Rockwilder; X-Treme

DJ Clue? chronology
DJ Clue Presents: Backstage Mixtape (Music Inspired by the Film) (2000)	The Professional 2 (2001)	The Professional 3 (2006)

Singles from The Professional 2
- 1. "Back 2 Life 2001" Released: 2001

Professional ratings
Review scores
Source	Rating
AllMusic	2.5/5 stars
Entertainment Weekly	B
HipHopDX	3.5/5
NME	5/5 stars
RapReviews	5.5/10
Voir	3.5/5 stars

The Professional 2 is the second studio album by American record producer DJ Clue?. Originally scheduled for a November 1999 release, it was then delayed to a 2000 release. The album was ultimately released on February 27, 2001 via Island Def Jam Music Group, DJ Clue?'s Desert Storm Records and Jay-Z's Roc-A-Fella Records. It serves as a sequel to his 1998 debut studio album The Professional.

Recording sessions took place at Right Track Studios, at Soundtrack Studios, at Baseline Studios, at The Hit Factory, and at Desert Storms Studios in New York City, at McClair Digital Studios in Canada, at Black Friday Recording Studio in Philadelphia, at Enterprise Studios and at Larrabee West Studios in Los Angeles, at 4 Stars Recording Studios in Florida, and at Mirror Image Studios. Production was handled by Ken "Duro" Ifill, Rick Rock, Bernard "Big Demi" Parker, Charly "Suga Bear" Charles, DJ Twinz, Just Blaze, Rashad Smith, Righteous Funk Boogie, Rockwilder, X-Treme and Clue? himself.

It features guest appearances from Beanie Sigel, Jay-Z, Kurupt, Memphis Bleek, Eminem, Royce da 5'9" Busta Rhymes, Cam'ron, Capone-N-Noreaga, Daz Dillinger, DMX, Fabolous, Foxy Brown, Freeway, Geda K, Ghostface Killah, Junior M.A.F.I.A., Lady Luck, Lil' Kim, Mary J. Blige, Method Man, Mobb Deep, Nas, Nature, P. Diddy, Raekwon, Rah Digga, Redman, Snoop Dogg, The Lox, Trick Daddy, Trina, Ty Shaw and Bathgate.

The album peaked at number three on the Billboard 200 chart, and number one on the Top R&B/Hip-Hop Albums chart. It was certified gold by the Recording Industry Association of America on March 28, 2001, and according to Nielsen SoundScan, it has sold 882,000 copies in the United States. Its only single "Back 2 Life 2001" made it to #57 on the Hot R&B/Hip-Hop Songs and #50 on the R&B/Hip-Hop Airplay.

== Track listing ==
No.	Title	Writer(s)	Producer(s)	Length
1.	"Intro" (featuring Diddy)			0:54
2.	"Back 2 Life 2001" (featuring Jadakiss and Mary J. Blige)	Ernesto Shaw; Jason Phillips; Mary J. Blige; Ken "DURO" Ifill; Beresford Romeo; Caron Wheeler; Nellee Hooper	DJ Clue; DURO	3:30
3.	"Jay-Z Freestyle"	Shaw; Shawn Carter; Ifill; Allie Wrubel; Christopher Wallace; Herbert Magidson; Nashiem Myrick; Sean Combs	DJ Clue; DURO	2:42
4.	"Who's Next (X-Clue-Sive)" (featuring DMX)	Earl Simmons; Floyd Butler; Harry James Elston; Ray Cork; Stephanie Black	X-Treme	3:25
5.	"Coming for You" (featuring Beanie Sigel and Freeway)	Dwight Grant; Leslie Pridgen; Bernard Parker	Bernard "Big Demi" Parker	4:02
6.	"Fantastic Four, Pt. 2" (featuring The Lox, Cam'ron, Nature and Fabolous)	Shaw; Cameron Giles; David Styles; Phillips; Jermaine Baxter; John D. Jackson; Sean Jacobs; Ifill; Gloria Jones; Janie Bradford	DJ Clue; DURO	4:41
7.	"Getting It" (featuring Busta Rhymes and Rah Digga)	Rashia Tashan Fisher; Trevor Smith; Dana Stinson	Rockwilder	4:14
8.	"Cream 2001" (featuring Raekwon and Ghostface Killah)	Corey Woods; Dennis Coles; Ricardo Thomas	Rick Rock	3:40
9.	"What the Beat" (featuring Method Man and Bad Meets Evil)	Shaw; Clifford Smith; Marshall Mathers; Ryan Montgomery; Ifill	DJ Clue; DURO	3:04
10.	"Interlude" (featuring Lil' Mo)	Cynthia Loving	DJ Clue; DURO	1:08
11.	"Fuck a Bitch" (featuring Snoop Dogg and Kurupt)	Shaw; Cordozar Broadus; Ricardo Brown, Jr.; Ifill	DJ Clue; DURO	3:05
12.	"Change the Game (Remix)" (featuring Jay-Z, Tha Dogg Pound, Beanie Sigel and Memphis Bleek)	Grant; Carter; Thomas; Stephen Garrett	Rick Rock	4:51
13.	"My Niggaz Dem" (featuring Trick Daddy and Trina)	Katrina Taylor; Maurice Young; Adam Duggins	Righteous Funk Boogie	3:30
14.	"Live from the Bridge" (featuring Nas)	Shaw; Nasir Jones; Ifill	DJ Clue; DURO	2:46
15.	"So Hot" (featuring Foxy Brown)	Shaw; Inga D. Marchand; Ifill	DJ Clue; DURO	3:37
16.	"Chinatown" (featuring Junior M.A.F.I.A.)	Antoine Spain; Jamel Fisher; James Lloyd; Kimberly Jones; Charly Charles	Charly "Suga Bear" Charles	3:28
17.	"Bathgate Freestyle"	Lionel Evans; James Brown; James Todd Smith; Jean-Claude Olivier; Lyn Collins; Samuel Barnes	DJ Clue; DURO	0:56
18.	"M.A.R.C.Y." (featuring Memphis Bleek and Geda K)	Malik Cox; Justin Smith	Just Blaze	3:11
19.	"I Don't Care" (featuring Capone-N-Noreaga)	Shaw; Kiam Holley; Victor Santiago; Ifill; Lamont Dozier	DJ Clue; DURO	3:52
20.	"The Best of Queens (It's Us)" (featuring Mobb Deep)	Albert Johnson; Kejuan Waliek Muchita; Rashad Smith	Rashad Smith	3:33
21.	"RED" (featuring Redman)	Reggie Noble; Raymond Grant; Richard Grant	DJ Twinz	2:46
22.	"Dangerous" (featuring Muggs and Lady Luck)	Shaw; Paul Kane; Shanell Jones; Ifill; Shannon Jones	DJ Clue; DURO	3:12
23.	"Phone Patch" (featuring Ty Shaun)	Shaw; Ty Shaun Johnson; Ifill; Woods; Robert F. Diggs	DJ Clue; DURO	1:16
Total length:				1:11:23

Sample credits

- Track 2 contains a sample from "Back To Life", written by Paul Hooper, Trevor Romeo, Caron Wheeler and Simon Alban Law
- Track 3 contains elements from "Who Shot Ya", written by Christopher Wallace, Sean Combs, Nashiem Myrick, Allie Wrubel and Herbert Magidsion, performed by Notorious B.I.G.
- Track 4 contains a sample from "Thumb Tripping (I'll Be Moving)", written by Stephanie Black, Floyd Butler, Ray Cork and Harry Elston, performed by The Friends of Distinction
- Track 6 contains a sample from "Share My Love", written by Janie Bradford and Gloria Jones, performed by Rare Earth
- Track 17 contains a sample from "I Shot Ya", written by James Todd Smith, Jean-Claude Olivier, Samuel Barnes, James Brown and Lyn Collins, performed by LL Cool J
- Track 19 contains a sample from "Shine", written and performed by Lamont Dozier
- Track 23 contains a sample from "Incarcerated Scarfaces", written by Robert Diggs and Corey Woods, performed by Raekwon

== Personnel ==
- Ernesto Shaw – main artist, producer (tracks: 2, 3, 6, 9–11, 14, 15, 17, 19, 22, 23), co-executive producer
- Ken "Duro" Ifill – producer (tracks: 2, 3, 6, 9–11, 14, 15, 17, 19, 22, 23), co-executive producer, recording (tracks: 2, 9–11, 14, 19, 20, 22, 23), mixing (tracks: 2, 4–6, 8–20, 22, 23)
- X-treme – producer (track 4)
- Denis Tougas – recording (track 4)
- Greg Below – recording (track 4)
- Bernard "Big Demi" Parker – producer (track 5)
- Karl "Bubb" Patrick – recording (track 5)
- Kenneth "KJ" Deshields – recording (track 5)
- Brian Garten – recording (tracks: 6, 9, 17), assistant mixing (track 6), Pro Tools editing
- Paul Gregory – assistant mixing (track 6)
- Dana "Rockwilder" Stinson – producer (track 7)
- Vinnie Nicoletti – recording & mixing (track 7)
- Ricardo Thomas – producer (tracks: 8, 12)
- C.J. DeVillar – recording (track 8)
- Tyson – assistant mixing (track 8)
- Chauncey Mahan – programming & recording (track 12)
- Shane "Bermuda" Woodley – assistant engineering (track 12)
- Adam Duggins – producer & recording (track 13)
- Dylan Dresdow – mixing (track 14)
- Pat Viala – recording (track 15)
- Charly "Suga Bear" Charles – producer (track 16)
- Gimel "Young Guru" Keaton – recording (tracks: 16, 18)
- Justin Smith – producer (track 18)
- Rashad Smith – producer (track 20)
- Tim Olmstead – assistant mixing (track 20)
- Raymond Grant – producer (track 21)
- Richard Grant – producer (track 21)
- Mike Coach – recording (track 21)
- Mike Hogan – recording (track 21)
- Tommy Uzzo – mixing (track 21)
- Tom Coyne – mastering
- Skane – A&R, co-executive producer, management
- Gee Roberson – A&R
- Darcell Lawrence – A&R
- Rick Patrick – art direction
- Dawud West – artwork & design
- Jonathan Mannion – photography
- Damon Dash – executive producer
- Kareem "Biggs" Burke – executive producer
- Shawn "Jay-Z" Carter – executive producer, vocals (tracks: 3, 12)
- Deidre L. Graham – management
- Chaka Pilgrim – management
- Gizelle Galang – legal counsel
- Jonathan Lieberman – legal counsel
- Sean John Combs – vocals (track 1)
- Mary Jane Blige – vocals (track 2)
- Jason Terrance Phillips – vocals (tracks: 2, 6)
- Earl Simmons – vocals (track 4)
- Leslie Edward Pridgen – vocals (track 5)
- Dwight Equan Grant – vocals (tracks: 5, 12)
- Cameron Giles – vocals (track 6)
- John David Jackson – vocals (track 6)
- Jermaine Baxter – vocals (track 6)
- Sean Divine Jacobs – vocals (track 6)
- David Styles – vocals (track 6)
- Rashia Tashan Fisher – vocals (track 7)
- Trevor George Smith Jr. – vocals (track 7)
- Corey Woods – vocals (track 8)
- Dennis Coles – vocals (track 8)
- Clifford Smith – vocals (track 9)
- Marshall Bruce Mathers III – vocals (track 9)
- Ryan Daniel Montgomery – vocals (track 9)
- Cynthia Loving – vocals (track 10)
- Calvin Cordozar Broadus – vocals (track 11)
- Ricardo "Kurupt" Brown – vocals (tracks: 11, 12)
- Delmar Drew Arnaud – vocals (track 12)
- Malik Cox – vocals (tracks: 12, 18)
- Stephen Garrett – additional vocals (track 12)
- Maurice Young – vocals (track 13)
- Katrina "Trina" Taylor – vocals (track 13)
- Nasir Jones – vocals (track 14)
- Brian James – guitar (track 14)
- Charlie Bereal – keyboards (track 14)
- Inga DeCarlo Fung Marchand – vocals (track 15)
- Antoine "Larceny" Spain – vocals (track 16)
- Jamel "Bristal" Fisher – vocals (track 16)
- James Lloyd – vocals (track 16)
- Kimberly Jones – vocals (track 16)
- Lionel Evans – vocals (track 17)
- Gary Anthony Grainger – vocals (track 18)
- Kiam Akasi Holley – vocals (track 19)
- Victor Santiago, Jr. – vocals (track 19)
- Albert Johnson – vocals (track 20)
- Kejuan Waliek Muchita – vocals (track 20)
- Reginald "Reggie" Noble – vocals (track 21)
- Paul "Muggs" Cain – vocals (track 22)
- Shanell Jones – vocals (track 22)
- Ty Shaun Johnson – vocals (track 23)

== Charts ==
=== Weekly charts ===
Chart (2001)	Peak position
Canadian Albums (Billboard)	16
French Albums (SNEP)	98
German Albums (Offizielle Top 100)	82
US Billboard 200	3
US Top R&B/Hip-Hop Albums (Billboard)	1

=== Year-end charts ===
Chart (2001)	Position
US Billboard 200	112
US Top R&B/Hip-Hop Albums (Billboard)	38

== Certifications ==
Region	Certification	Certified units/sales
United States (RIAA)	Gold	500,000^{^}
^{^} Shipments figures based on certification alone.

== See also ==
- List of Billboard number-one R&B albums of 2001
