= The Understanding (Memphis Bleek album) =

Studio album by Memphis Bleek
- Released: December 5, 2000
- Recorded: 1999–2000
- Studio: Baseline Studios (New York, NY); Manhattan Center Studios (New York, NY); Quad Studios (New York, NY)
- Genre: Hip-hop
- Length: 50:53
- Label: Roc-A-Fella; Def Jam
- Producer: Shawn Carter (exec.); Damon Dash (exec.); Kareem "Biggs" Burke (exec.); A Kid Called Roots; DJ Twinz; Duane "Da Roc" Ramos; Eddie Scoresazy; Ez Elpee; Jose "Lace" Batiz; Just Blaze; Lofey; Robert 'Shim' Kirkland; Timbaland; T.T.

Memphis Bleek chronology
Coming of Age (1999)	The Understanding (2000)	M.A.D.E. (2003)

Singles from The Understanding
- 1. "My Mind Right" Released: March 5, 2000; 2. "Is That Your Chick (The Lost Verses)" Released: September 12, 2000; 3. "Do My..." Released: February 13, 2001

Professional ratings
Review scores
Source	Rating
AllMusic	3/5 stars
HipHopDX	3.5/5 stars
Los Angeles Times	3/4 stars
NME	3.5/5 stars
RapReviews	7.5/10
Rolling Stone	3/5 stars
The Source	3.5/5 stars

The Understanding is the second studio album by American rapper Memphis Bleek. It was released on December 5, 2000, by Roc-A-Fella Records and Def Jam Recordings. The album was produced by Just Blaze, Robert 'Shim' Kirkland, A Kid Called Roots, DJ Twinz, Duane "Da Roc" Ramos, Eddie Scoresazy, Ez Elpee, Jose "Lace" Batiz, Lofey, Timbaland, and T.T., with Jay-Z, Damon Dash and Kareem "Biggs" Burke serving as executive producers. It features guest appearances from Jay-Z, Beanie Sigel, Amil, Carl Thomas, H. Money Bags, Missy Elliott, and Twista. In the United States, the album peaked at number 16 on the Billboard 200 and atop the Top R&B/Hip-Hop Albums charts. It was certified gold by the Recording Industry Association of America on January 8, 2001, for the sales of 500,000 units in the US alone. The album was supported with three singles: "My Mind Right", "Is That Your Chick (The Lost Verses)" and "Do My...".

== Track listing ==
Credits adapted from TIDAL.

No.	Title	Writer(s)	Producer(s)	Length
1.	"Intro – U Know Bleek"	Malik Cox; Justin Smith; Michael Kunze; Sylvester Levay; Amil Whitehead; Shawn Carter; Dwight Grant; Tyrone Fyffe	Just Blaze	1:51
2.	"Do My..." (featuring Jay-Z)	Cox; Carter; Patrick Lawrence	A Kid Called Roots	3:39
3.	"I Get High"	Cox; Edwin Delahoz; Ricardo Montaner; Pablo Manavello	T.T.	3:39
4.	"We Get Low"	Cox; Smith; Carter	Just Blaze	3:09
5.	"Change Up" (featuring Jay-Z and Beanie Sigel)	Cox; Carter; D. Grant; Robert Kirkland	Robert "Shim" Kirkland	2:05
6.	"My Mind Right (Remix)" (featuring Jay-Z, H Money Bags and Beanie Sigel)	Cox; Raymond Grant; Richard Grant; Lalo Schifrin	DJ Twinz	4:05
7.	"Hustlers" (featuring Beanie Sigel)	Cox; D. Grant; Jose Batiz	Jose "Lace" Batiz	4:11
8.	"All Types of Shit"	Cox; Edgar Hill; John Townsend; Carter	Eddie Scoresazy	3:48
9.	"PYT" (featuring Jay-Z and Amil)	Cox; Carter; Whitehead; Kirkland	Robert "Shim" Kirkland	3:58
10.	"Bounce Bitch"	Cox; Michael Sandlofer	Lofey	3:33
11.	"They'll Never Play Me"	Cox; Smith	Just Blaze	3:39
12.	"Everyday" (featuring Carl Thomas)	Cox; Carlton Thomas; Lamont Porter; Robert Relf; Thomas Anderson	EZ Elpee	4:12
13.	"Is That Your Chick (The Lost Verses)" (featuring Jay-Z, Twista and Missy "Misdemeanor" Elliott)	Cox; Carter; Carl Mitchell; Melissa Elliott; Timothy Mosley	Timbaland	4:54
14.	"In My Life"	Cox; Duane Ramos; Michael Jones	Duane "Da Roc" Ramos	4:10
Total length:				50:53

Sample credits

- "Intro – U Know Bleek" contains samples of:
  - "Madhouse", written by Michael Kunze and Sylvester Levay, and performed by Silver Convention.
  - "4 da Fam", written by Amil Whitehead, Malik Cox, Tyrone Fyffe, and Dwight Grant; and performed by Amil.
- "I Get High" contains a sample of "Reina de la Noche", written by Ricardo Montaner and Pablo Manavello, and performed by Ricardo Montaner.
- "My Mind Right (Remix)" contains an interpolation of "The Monk", written by Lalo Schifrin.
- "All Types of Shit" contains a sample from "Lady Luck", written by John Townsend.
- "Everyday" contains a sample of "If That's the Way You Feel (Then Let's Fall in Love)", written by Robert Relf and Thomas Anderson, and performed by White Heat.
- "In My Life" contains samples from "I Want to Know What Love Is", written by Mick Jones, and performed by Foreigner.

== Personnel ==
- Supa Engineer DURO – mixing (2, 4, 6, 7, 9, 10, 12)
- Bee High – co-executive producer
- Just Blaze – mixing (11)
- Kareem "Biggs" Burke – executive producer
- Shawn Carter – executive producer
- Damon Dash – executive producer
- Jimmy Douglass – engineer and mixing (13)
- Gimel "Young Guru" Keaton – engineer (1–6, 11, 12, 14), mixing (8), Pro Tools editing (13)
- Ken Lewis – guitar and mixing (11)
- Chauncey Mahan – engineer (7), Pro Tools editing (13)
- Midnite – engineer (3)
- Leonard "Lenny S." Santiago – co-executive producer
- Brian Stanley – engineer (7, 8, 10), mixing (1, 3, 14)
- Pat Viala – engineer (6, 9), mixing (5, 6)

== Charts ==
=== Weekly charts ===
Chart (2000)	Peak position
US Billboard 200	16
US Top R&B/Hip-Hop Albums (Billboard)	1

=== Year-end charts ===
Chart (2001)	Position
US Billboard 200	124
US Top R&B/Hip-Hop Albums (Billboard)	33

== Certifications ==
Region	Certification	Certified units/sales
United States (RIAA)	Gold	500,000^{^}
^{^} Shipments figures based on certification alone.

== See also ==
- List of Billboard number-one R&B albums of 2000
