= Get Low Records =

- Founded: 1998
- Founder: Malik Cox
- Distributor: E1
- Genre: Hip hop
- Country of origin: United States
- Location: New York City

Get Low Records is a record label founded by American rapper Memphis Bleek in 1998.

== History ==
Under the guidance of Jay-Z, Memphis Bleek founded his label, Get Low Records, in 1998. The label's first release was Memphis Bleek's debut album, Coming of Age, which went gold and helped the label gain some notoriety. During the year 2000, the label began feuding with Nas and Get Low released Bleek's second album, The Understanding, which also went gold. After the release of this album, the feud with Nas became public and distributing label, Roc-A-Fella Records quickly came to their defense, setting up the epic Jay-Z vs. Nas feud. In the time between Memphis Bleek's second and third albums, he signed rapper Geda K and former Junior M.A.F.I.A. member Lil' Cease to the label. In 2003, the label began feuding with west coast rapper The Game over the similar titling of his label at the time Get Low Recordz; they would trade disses from 2003 until 2007. This all led up to Bleek's third album M.A.D.E. and the label would later sign artists Livin Proof, Gbaby, and Latif in 2004. In 2005, the label released Memphis Bleek's fourth album 534 and signed an R&B singer named Coya. They also made peace with Nas around this time as well. Rappers Sniper and Phyro Son were signed to the label the following year. During this time, the label was reportedly preparing for album releases by Coya, Memphis Bleek, and Lil Cease. In the spring of 2014, Bleek announced that he would no longer use the 'Get Low' name and would re-vamp the company under a new moniker he chose called "Roc Solid", an ode to his tenure with Roc-A-Fella Records; the company released two mixtapes from Bleek called "The Movement" (2012) and "The Movement 2" (2014). In 2015, Bleek would change the name of the company to Warehouse Music Group.

== Artists ==
- Memphis Bleek (CEO)
- Livin' Proof
- Latif
- Geda K
- H. Money Bags
- Calico
- Lil' Cease

== Discography ==
- M.A.D.E. by Memphis Bleek
  - Released: December 16, 2003
  - Promotional label: Get Low/Roc-A-Fella
  - Distributing label: Def Jam Recordings
  - Singles: "Round Here," "Need Me In Your Life"
- 534 by Memphis Bleek
  - Released: May 17, 2005
  - Promotional label: Get Low/Roc-A-Fella
  - Distributing label: Def Jam Recordings
  - Singles: "Like That"
