= Memphis Bleek =

American rapper (born 1978)

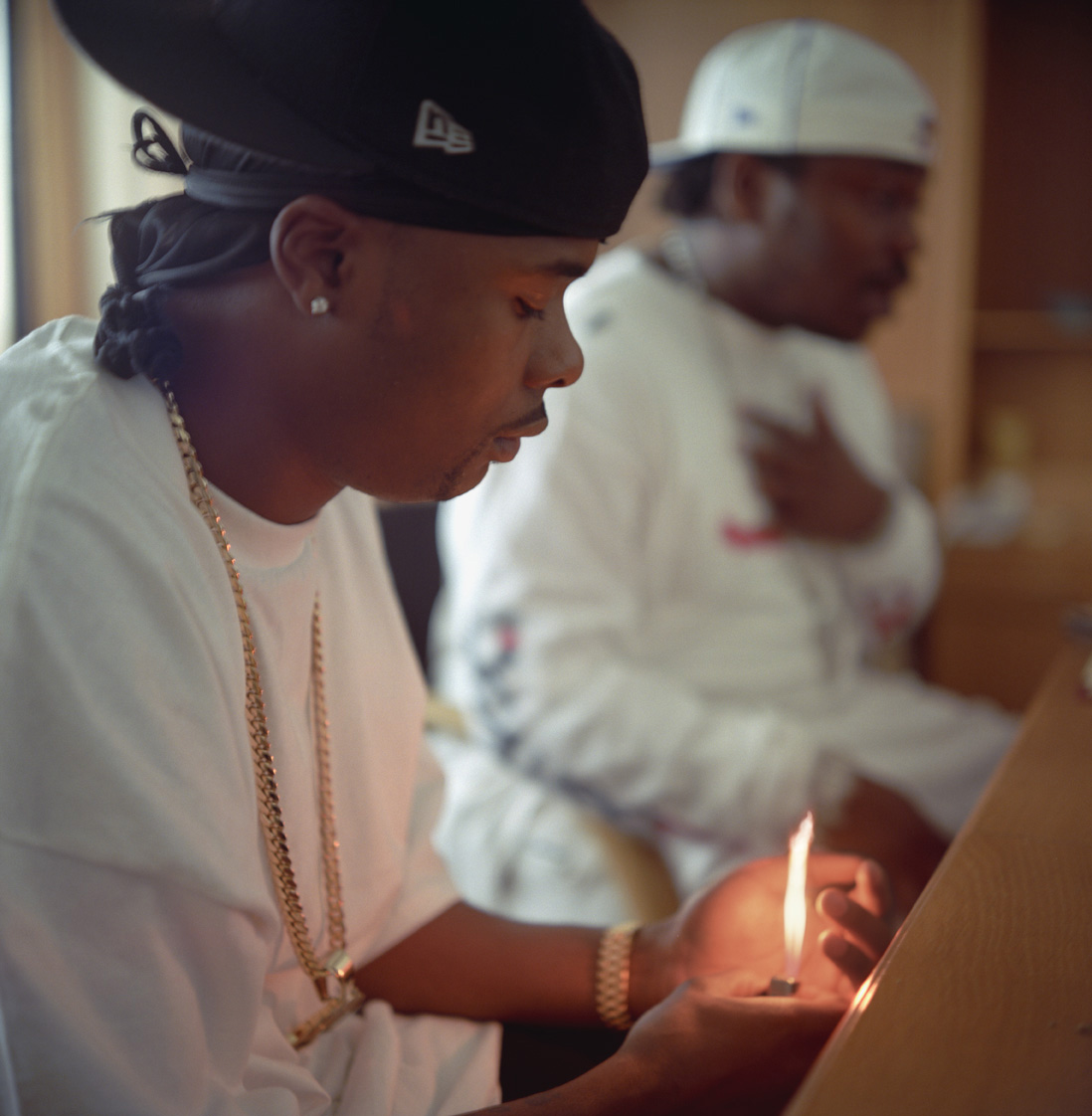
- Memphis Bleek (front) in 2001 with Beanie Sigel

Background information
- Born: Malik Deshawn Cox; June 23, 1978 (age 48); Brooklyn, New York City, U.S.
- Genre: East Coast hip-hop
- Occupations: Rapper; songwriter
- Years active: 1996–present
- Labels: Island Def Jam; Def Jam (former); Roc-A-Fella; Roc Nation
- Formerly of: Crooklyn Dodgers
- Spouse: Ashley Coombs (m. 2014)
- Children: 2

Malik Deshawn Cox (born June 23, 1978), known by his stage name Memphis Bleek, is an American rapper. He is best known for his work with fellow New York City-based rapper Jay-Z, with Cox often described as his hype man or protégé. Cox signed with his Roc-A-Fella Records label imprint in the late 1990s, through which he has released four major label studio albums: Coming of Age (1999), The Understanding (2000), M.A.D.E. (2003), and 534 (2005). He has since founded his own labels: Get Low Records in 1998, and Warehouse Music Group in 2016—through which he signed rapper Casanova.

== Early life ==
Memphis Bleek was born in Brooklyn. He grew up in the Marcy Houses, located in the Bedford–Stuyvesant neighborhood of Brooklyn, the same neighborhood as rapper Jay-Z.

== Music career ==
Memphis Bleek was one of the first artists signed to Roc-A-Fella, as a "protégé" of Jay-Z. The name "Memphis", which the rapper explained paid homage to pimps, was a backronym for "Making Easy Money, Pimping Hoes In Style" and "Bleek" was a childhood nickname stemming from his younger sister trying to pronounce his first name, Malik. Bleek's first official appearance was on the song "Coming of Age" from Jay-Z's Reasonable Doubt (1996), followed by an appearance on "Can I Live II", released on the reissued version of the album. He appeared on Jay-Z's subsequent albums: Vol. 2... Hard Knock Life (1998), Vol. 3… Life and Times of S. Carter (1999), The Dynasty: Roc La Familia (2000), and The Blueprint 2: The Gift & The Curse (2002). After the widescale success of Vol 2… Hard Knock Life, the label released Bleek's debut studio album, Coming of Age (1999). The album was the week's now-defunct "Hot Shot Debut", entering the Billboard 200 at number seven with 118,000 units sold. Bleek launched his own label, Get Low Records in 1998.

Thereafter, he released three follow-up albums for the label: The Understanding (2000), M.A.D.E. (2003), and 534 (2005). Coming of Age and The Understanding both received gold certification by the Recording Industry Association of America. During the release of The Understanding and M.A.D.E., he took a three-year hiatus, to take care of his older brother, who was severely injured in a motorcycle accident. 534 was named after the building number of the housing project in which he and Jay-Z grew up, and became the first release from the "new" Roc-A-Fella, referring to Jay-Z's operational departure from the label due to his newly-appointed role as president of Def Jam Recordings prior to its release. A song from the album, "Dear Summer", is performed solely by Jay-Z and refers to what he called the time of the year in which he would drop an album or single consecutively for eight years, and how he had to metaphorically leave "her" (Summer). "Dear Summer" would mark Jay-Z's first song since beginning his brief "retirement" in late 2003. 534 also contains one of the first recordings by then-unknown Def Jam labelmate, Rihanna, who featured on the song "The One".

Memphis Bleek's highest charting single was "Is That Yo Chick", featuring Missy Elliott and Jay-Z, which peaked at number 7 on the Hot Rap Singles Billboard chart and number 68 on the Billboard Hot 100. Other charting singles include "It's Alright", which also featured Jay-Z and peaked at number 61.

In fall 2005, Memphis Bleek told MTV that he was recording an album called The Process, that he would describe as a make or break album, saying "I want to do an album that's through the roof, I want to do a classic album. I feel that if this album I'm not recording is a classic, I'm not even gonna put it out. I have to do it bigger than anybody has ever done it. I have to make a good record this time, not just talking-junk records." The rapper has worked on the album since 2005, and during that time frame he would release the promotional singles: "Hustla", "Get Ya Money Off" and "Let It Off". As of 2026, the album has yet to be released. Memphis Bleek would eventually leave Roc-A-Fella in 2009, after Jay-Z told him he could run his own company and had the proper distribution deals to do so. That same year, Bleek signed a new deal with Mass Appeal Entertainment.

In the summer of 2010, he served as a hype man for Jay-Z on stage during a performance at the Swedish festival Peace&Love.

On April 10, 2012, Memphis Bleek released The Movement, an online mixtape which went on to receive over 125,000 downloads on DatPiff. On June 6, 2012, Memphis Bleek released Kush Vol. 2. On March 21, 2014, he released The Movement 2 as a mixtape for free download.

On June 20, 2025, Memphis Bleek released his fifth studio album, Apt 3D. The project, which features a collaboration with Benny the Butcher and Smoke DZA, marked his first major studio release in over two decades.

== Personal life ==
On December 13, 2014, Cox married longtime girlfriend, Ashley Coombs, in an evening ceremony at The Merion in Cinnaminson, New Jersey, in which Jay-Z was in attendance. In July 2018, Cox announced the birth of their first child, a daughter. Cox also has a son, born in June 2002. Cox is the cousin of fellow Brooklyn rapper Sean Price.

== Other ventures ==
=== Warehouse Music Group ===
Warehouse Music Group
- Founded: 2016
- Founder: Malik Cox
- Status: Defunct
- Distributor: Roc Nation
- Genre: Hip hop
- Country of origin: United States
- Location: New York City

Getting the approval of Jay-Z in 2015, Memphis Bleek started his own label, as CEO and founder of Warehouse Music Group. The debut release from the label was Memphis Bleek's single "So Different" featuring Manolo Rose, which created a big buzz for the label. On July 28, 2016, Memphis Bleek made the announcement of signing Manolo Rose and Casanova. In 2017, Manolo Rose released "Ball Drop" and "Pink Fur". That same year, Casanova released three big singles: "Don't Run", "Go Best Friend" and "Left, Right" featuring Chris Brown and Fabolous. In July 2026, Memphis Bleek announced the label's dissolution via interview, saying: "Warehouse Music Group is still a family, [but] we're not a label anymore."

=== Films ===
In 2002, Memphis Bleek starred in State Property as Blizz. That same year, he was also in Paper Soldiers. He's had cameos in Backstage and Fade to Black as well.

=== Video games ===
Memphis Bleek is a playable character in the video game Def Jam: Fight for NY.

== Discography ==
Studio albums

- Coming of Age (1999)
- The Understanding (2000)
- M.A.D.E. (2003)
- 534 (2005)
- Apt 3D (2025)
