= 534 (album) =

Studio album by Memphis Bleek
- Released: May 17, 2005
- Recorded: 2004–2005
- Genre: Hip hop
- Length: 48:51
- Labels: Roc-A-Fella; Get Low; Def Jam
- Producers: Jay-Z (exec.); Just Blaze; Swizz Beatz; Demi-Doc; Irv Gotti; Bink!; LeQwan Bell; Chad Hamilton; Ryan Press; 9th Wonder; Shea Taylor; Coptic

Memphis Bleek chronology
M.A.D.E. (2003)	534 (2005)	Apt 3D (2025)

Singles from 534
- 1. "Like That" Released: 2005; 2. "Infatuated" Released: 2005; 3. "Dear Summer" Released: June 1, 2005

534 is the fourth studio album by rapper Memphis Bleek. Released by Get Low Records, Roc-A-Fella Records, and Def Jam Recordings on May 17, 2005, the album was executive produced by Bleek's mentor Jay-Z, who also recorded the song "Dear Summer" for the album. Other guests include Young Gunz, M.O.P., and Rihanna, whose appearance on the song "The One" marked her major label debut.

534 debuted at number 11 on the Billboard 200 chart, selling 60,000 copies in the first week. The album received mixed reviews from music critics, with most of them praising the production on the album, while criticizing Memphis Bleek's lyrics and performance.

== Recording ==
534 was recorded in a "relatively stripped down studio setting", with help from Young Guru. In an interview with Billboard magazine Memphis Bleek said this setup was reminiscent of the times when he had just started rapping. The album was executive produced by Bleek's mentor and friend Jay-Z, under the name "The Carter Administration". Jay-Z, who had previously announced his retirement, also recorded a song for the album, "Dear Summer", which was supposed to be his final song. Unlike other songs on the album, "Dear Summer" doesn't feature Memphis Bleek's vocals.

According to Memphis Bleek, 534 was a "people's album", as he was trying to appeal to the tastes of various people around him. "I let a good opportunity slip by", said Bleek in an interview to HipHopDX.

534 includes "The One", which was the first major-label recording from Rihanna and preceded her debut single "Pon de Replay" by a single week.

The album's title is a reference to 534 Flushing Ave., the address of Marcy Houses, where Bleek and Jay-Z grew up.

== Commercial performance ==
534 was released on May 17, 2005, by Roc-A-Fella Records and Def Jam Recordings. Upon its release, the album charted on the US Billboard 200, where it debuted at number 11 with 60,000 copies sold in the first week. 534 also reached number 3 on Billboard's US Top R&B/Hip-Hop Albums chart and number 1 on US Top Rap Albums. As of 2009, the album has sold 164,000 copies.

== Critical reception ==
Professional ratings
Review scores
Source	Rating
AllMusic	2.5/5 stars
Blender	2/5 stars
Entertainment Weekly	C
HipHopDX	3.5/5 stars
Los Angeles Times	2/4 stars
Pitchfork Media	4.3/10
PopMatters	5/10
RapReviews	7.5/10
Rolling Stone	3/5 stars
Vibe	3/5 stars

534 received mixed reviews from music critics. In his review for AllMusic, Andy Kellman said that "[e]ven in its best moments [...] it's usually the production work [...] that attracts the attention, not Bleek". Margeaux Watson of Entertainment Weekly praised Jay-Z's performance on the track "Dear Summer", while simultaneously criticized Memphis Bleek as his "unimaginative apprentice", who's left with the rest of the album, which she called an "uneven mix of contrived party songs and well-produced yet lyrically insipid street tales". Anthony Springer from HipHopDX wrote of the album: "While 534 is a step up for Bleek, several missteps keep this album from reaching its full potential". Despite that, he considered 534 to be one of the best Bleek's albums. Soren Baker of Los Angeles Times thought 534 was an "uneven [collection] of rap cliches and music production styles that have been pioneered by other artists", similar to Bleek's previous albums. Pitchfork's Tom Breihan criticized the album, calling Bleek's lyrics "staggeringly lame" and "bizarrely terrible", but praised the production and Jay-Z's performance on "Dear Summer". Justin Cober-Lake of PopMatters described Memphis Bleek's performance on the album as "a steady if uninventive flow and straightforward lyrics". James Corne from RapReviews assessed the album as above average, claiming that it's a "good listen, but [Bleek is] just not a top rank contender" and that 534 is "still too generic to stand out". He ended his review stating: "Each song aims at hitting a different listener instead of using the universal appeal of emotion and empathy to sell us all". Rolling Stone magazine published a positive review for the album, saying that Memphis Bleek "matches the sleek intensity of Just Blaze's beats, providing smart and brassy [...] rhymes". The Washington Post's Joe Warminsky characterized Bleek's performance as "monosyllabic, slang-heavy lyrics [that] rarely offer more than one-dimensional descriptions of life", while commending the album's producers.

== Track listing ==
Credits are adapted from Tidal.

No.	Title	Writer(s)	Producer(s)	Length
1.	"534"	Malik Cox; Justin Smith; Graham Preskett	Just Blaze	2:42
2.	"Interlude"	Smith; Lisa Koch	Just Blaze	0:16
3.	"Dear Summer" (performed by Jay-Z)	Shawn Carter; Smith; Don Blackman	Just Blaze	2:53
4.	"Like That"	Cox; Kasseem Dean; Ralph Bailey; Rudy Clark; Ken Williams; Paul Simon	Swizz Beatz	3:16
5.	"Infatuated" (featuring Boxie)	Cox; Irving Lorenzo; Demetrius McGhee; Jeffrey Atkins	Demi-Doc; Irv Gotti	4:05
6.	"The One" (featuring Rihanna)	Cox; Roosevelt Harrell; Evan Rogers; Carl Sturken; Charles Jackson; Marvin Yancy	Bink!	4:00
7.	"First, Last and Only" (featuring M.O.P.)	Cox; LeQwan Bell; Eric Murray; Jamal Grinnage; Leroy Hutson; Michael Hawkins	LeQwan Bell	3:01
8.	"Get Low" (featuring Livin' Proof)	Cox; Chad Hamilton; Ryan Presson; Obress Guy; Wylie Dixon; Bobby Pointer; Ronald Simmons; Walter Simmons	Chad Hamilton; Ryan Press (co.)	3:03
9.	"Oh Baby" (featuring Young Gunz)	Cox; Harrell; Christopher Ries; Hanif Muhammad	Bink!	4:06
10.	"Smoke the Pain Away" (featuring Denim)	Cox; Patrick Douthit; Dexter Wansel	9th Wonder	4:27
11.	"Hater Free"	Cox; Shea Taylor	Shea Taylor	3:58
12.	"Alright"	Cox; Douthit; Teddy Randazzo	9th Wonder	3:52
13.	"All About Me"	Cox; Eric Matlock; Gerald Stevens; Bruce Fischel; Vicky Germaise; Randy Klein	Coptic; Soul G	4:20
14.	"Straight Path"	Cox; Smith; Al Green; Willie Mitchell	Just Blaze	4:52
Total length:				48:51

Sample credits

- "534" contains an interpolation of "London, Paris, New York", written by Graham Preskett.
- "Interlude" contains a sample of "Summer Song", written and performed by Lisa Koch.
- "Dear Summer" features samples from "Morning Sunrise", written by Don Blackman, and performed by Lenny White.
- "Like That" contains samples of:
  - "Everybody Plays the Fool", written by Ralph Bailey, Rudy Clark, and Ken Williams; performed by The Main Ingredient.
  - "Loves Me Like a Rock", written by Paul Simon and performed by The Dixie Hummingbirds.
- "The One" contains a sample of "Just Can't Stay Away", written by Charles Jackson and Marvin Yancy, and performed by Natalie Cole.
- "First, Last and Only" contains a sample of "Never Know What You Can Do (Give It a Try)", written by Leroy Hutson and Michael Hawkins, and performed by Lee Hutson.
- "Get Low" contains a sample of "Bootleggin'", written by Wylie Dixon, Bobby Pointer, Ronald Simmons, and Walter Simmons; and performed by Simtec & Wylie.
- "Smoke the Pain Away" contains a sample of "I Think I'll Stay Home Today", written by Dexter Wansel, and performed by Billy Paul.
- "Alright" contains a sample of "Trace of Your Love", written by Teddy Randazzo, and performed by Joe Simon.
- "All About Me" contains a sample of "Slow Tongue", written by Bruce Fischel, Vicky Germaise, and Randy Klein; and performed by Millie Jackson.
- "Straight Path" contains a sample of "Something", written by Al Green and Willie Mitchell, and performed by Al Green.

== Personnel ==
Credits are adapted from the album's liner notes and Tidal.

- David Brown – engineer (1–3, 14), assistant mix engineer (1–4, 7, 8, 10–14), additional vocal engineering (6)
- Milwaukee "Protools King" Buck – engineer and mixing (5)
- The Carter Administration – executive producer
- Tony Dawsey – mastering
- Nichell Delvaille – design coordination
- Demi-Doc – instrumentation (5)
- Andrea Derby – production manager (6)
- Al Hemberger – engineer (6)
- Rob Heselden – production assistant (6)
- Gimel "Young Guru" Keaton – engineer (1–3, 6–14), mixing (1–4, 7, 8, 10–14)
- Jonathan Mannion – photography
- Andrea Mitchell – photo production
- Monica Morrow – stylist
- Robert Sims – art direction, design
- Doug Wilson – mixing (6, 9)

== Charts ==
Chart (2005)	Peak position
US Billboard 200	11
US Top R&B/Hip-Hop Albums (Billboard)	3
US Top Rap Albums (Billboard)	1
