= Joker (soundtrack) =

Joker: Original Motion Picture Soundtrack

Soundtrack album by Hildur Guðnadóttir
- Released: October 4, 2019
- Recorded: June 2019
- Studios: Downtown Music (New York City, New York); The DiMenna Center (New York City, New York)
- Genres: Orchestral; contemporary classical; minimal; ambient; dark ambient; film score
- Length: 36:26
- Label: WaterTower
- Producers: Hildur Guðnadóttir; Sam Slater

Hildur Guðnadóttir chronology
Chernobyl: Music from the Original TV Series (2019)	Joker: Original Motion Picture Soundtrack (2019)	Tár (Music from and Inspired by the Motion Picture) (2022)

Joker: Original Motion Picture Soundtrack is the original soundtrack album to the 2019 film Joker, based on the DC Comics character of the same name, starring Joaquin Phoenix, Robert De Niro, Zazie Beetz, and Frances Conroy. The record consists of seventeen tracks from a film score written and composed by Hildur Guðnadóttir which received critical acclaim from the film industry. Hildur's score was released digitally by WaterTower Music on September 27, 2019, with a vinyl edition later released on December 13.

After reading the film's script, Hildur was asked by director Todd Phillips to write some music based on her feelings of the Joker screenplay, which she was inspired to do so as it resonated with her. She sent Phillips a sample of her composition which included melodies that were very simplistic and monotonic as a means of conflating the film's gritty tone with that of protagonist Arthur Fleck. Hildur then attempted to expand - within that simplicity - the orchestration around Phoenix's character without chords or complicated music, but instead with a texture she that felt resonated with the melancholia of the character.

The score for Joker won numerous awards, including the Premio Soundtrack Stars Award at the 76th Venice International Film Festival, a Golden Globe Award for Best Original Score, a BAFTA Award for Best Original Music, and an Academy Award for Best Original Score.

== Background ==
Todd Phillips signed on to direct the film Joker for Warner Bros. in August 2017, and insisted to bring on Hildur Guðnadóttir to work on Joker after he heard her score for Sicario: Day of the Soldado (2018), of which he thought was beautiful. Hildur was later announced as the composer of Joker. To interpret the many themes explored throughout Joker, director Phillips very early on turned to Guðnadóttir: "[Guðnadóttir] was writing music as far back as pre-production. I was sending her script pages and she was writing music before we even shot [...]". Hildur was very curious of Phillips' take on the Joker's origin story, wherein Phillips then sent her the screenplay, to which he stated: "It was just an interesting and deep character study and it's a very fascinating character that we didn't have any idea about". She described her work with Phillips as "a really beautiful process", in that Phillips was curious to hear what she thought the story sounded like; asking her to compose based on her feelings of the script, to which she said: "It can sometimes take awhile to get on the same page when you're working on a project, but this time we were just in such strong agreement from the very first. It was a really lovely, straightforward, non-violent dialogue".

== Original score ==
=== Research ===
Unlike her previous collaborations, Hildur began composing Arthur's theme during the pre-production of Joker, with Phillips initially hiring her simply to come back to him with some ideas rather than a full score. Phillips asked if she was interested in writing some music just based on her feelings of the script: "He didn't really give me any instruction, as such, he was just curious to hear what I felt". In an interview with Deadline Hollywood, Hildur remarked that the script resonated with her and that Phillips believed she captured the atmosphere of Joker, based on the sample she sent him. She was struck by the "multi-dimensional simplicity, so openhearted and childlike" characteristics of Phoenix's Arthur, thus attempted to expand within that simplicity the orchestration around it, not with chords or any complicated music, but instead: "[...] with texture that I felt resonated with the melancholia of his character". Her composition of Joker features the cello as the centerpiece of the score, leading the very string-based melodies. Hildur revealed there is often a whole symphony orchestra of 90 musicians playing the same thing; highlighting the importance of such a thing being hidden behind the cello, in which she felt Arthur is mirrored in a similar fashion: "There are many layers of complication behind [Arthur], but he doesn't see it". She also added that: "I thought orchestrating it that way, so that instruments are not always audible, you will think you're just listening to one cello but, like Arthur, there are layers behind it".

Hildur said that her score was going to be "completely different" than other scores from her. She began work on Joker concurrently with that of Chernobyl (2019), in which she took a more traditional, instrumental approach in its composition: "I got a lot of space from [Phillips], who was quite brave with a lot of the decisions that he allowed me to go wild with". She spoke of emphasising with Arthur and highlighted the music's attempt to connect with his inner personal word, adding that: "[...] the main theme came before [Phoenix's] performance and it played a big part in informing his performance. It's definitely more lyrical and musical than Chernobyl". Hildur was able to introduce her music during film production and brought a piece to Phoenix a few weeks into filming as a means of inspiring his work in a pivotal scene. Director Phillips spoke of how Phoenix and he were at a standstill on set - unable to figure out a particular scene - though referred to Hildur, by which he spoke: "[...] but then I remembered I'd just gotten this great piece of music from [Hildur] that I'd been listening to the night before. I played it for him, he loved it, and he just started doing this slow dance to it, and out of nowhere this gracefulness comes out of Arthur [...]". Phoenix attested that her score was very effective, whilst adding the preparation was in studying movement and dance during rehearsals, but what came out of that piece of score was a turning point for understanding Arthur.

In going back and forth between Chernobyl and Joker, Hildur remarked that it wasn't an easy process due to the differences in tonality, worlds, and structure of the two pieces, whilst noting that Joker is the most "classical" score she's written, as it's very melodic, and follows a film score structure with the development of themes repeatedly. She acknowledged that she wished to keep elements of old school scoring - as how the film was, hence the thematic approach; she also spoke of being careful not to be influenced by any of the Joker's previous appearances or the music that followed him, feeling a greater creative freedom when steering clear of outside influences. Additionally, Hildur spoke of feeling there was greater room to work both thematically and imaginatively, based on the fact Joker was fiction, in which she added: "It was more an emotional and, above all, surprising search for the character, someone with whom everyone in my generation grew up, but whose motives are unknown to anyone. And this version was surprising for everyone".

=== Composition ===
Phillips' Joker allowed for Hildur's imagination to "run wild a bit more", in that she decided to write something orchestra-led, though this time it was the process that was unconventional. Her compositions resonated with him, which resulted in him shooting a lot of material: "[....] I think, to the music I had already written [most film soundtracks are written to shot footage]. That was really wonderful because the music and the film have really grown together as one whole". After reading and responding to the script, Hildur wrote a tender, melancholy requiem to which she channeled Phoenix's Arthur, wherein she stated that: "I sat down with the cello to kind of just find my way into his voice and into his head [...] And I'm just like kind of holding onto this feeling that I had after reading the script. As soon as I played those first notes, it really hit me in the chest somehow, and it was a really strong, physical reaction that I got. And I was like, yes, this is it".

The score is led by the cello, yet - according to Hildur - the music feels surprisingly symphonic, as the cello is carried by a hundred-piece orchestra throughout the film. She wanted this feeling of energy to be coming from behind him, like a feeling of his past he doesn't know about, yet is still influencing him: "So the orchestra is kept in the background in the beginning of the score [...] as Arthur realizes more and more about his past, the orchestra steps forward. It becomes more and more aggressive as the score gets bigger and bigger". She spoke of sitting down with her cello and attempting to find her way into Arthur's voice and into his head, eventually doing so: "[...] it was a really strong, physical reaction that I got. And I was like, yes, this is it". Because Hildur started composing for Joker so early, her music influenced other aspects of the productions, including the acting and cinematography, to which she later states: "It's a huge luxury and much more creative [...] Of course, it's a much longer process – I worked on the Joker for a year and a half – but it gives you the opportunity to create a more holistic work of art".

Director Phillips decided to play Hildur's music on set during a pivotal scene. Cinematographer Lawrence Sher revealed that an entirely different scene was meant to be shot: "[Before] It was much more like a movie scene. It had to do with him coming in, digesting this thing that just happened, what he'd just done. He was going to hide a weapon. [It was] much more conventional". Phillips changed his mind - playing Hildur's composition over each and every take, in which Phoenix's Arthur starts his metamorphosis dance, by which Sher added: "The score was such an instrumental part, not just to Joaquin's performance, but to the camera operating, to the sort of energy in the room, and to make that scene really come alive". She also stated that Phoenix had an earpiece that fed her music to him so he could shape his performance from the music right on the spot. Hildur gave her assessment of the scene's power, revealing that piece was actually the first one written for the film, in which she remarked: "It was the very first piece of music I wrote, and that piece, it was the strongest, most physical reaction I had to the story [...] What [Phoenix] is doing in the scene, it was coming from exactly the same place". In relation to the cello, Hildur continued: "Of course, I grew up with the instrument and have a very strong physical and emotional connection to it. Having that as a starting point, I had what was almost like an electric shock when I found his theme".

Phillips spoke of how Phoenix just started to dance to Hildur's music, while adding: "It was just me and him alone in the bathroom, there's 250 people on the crew waiting outside. He just starts doing this dance, and we both kind of look at each other and said "ok, that's the scene". Phoenix, on the genesis of Bathroom Dance, highlighted Hildur's music: "[Phillips] started playing this cello music, and it was really effective. I said, 'So, maybe there's a movement', and he said, 'Well, I would start on your foot—that's your move'. That's all he said and all we had. The preparation was in studying movement and dance during rehearsals, but what came out of that piece of score was a turning point for the character, and for me and [Phillips] working together [...] and understanding Arthur". Phillips - when first discussing the themes of Joker with Phoenix - mentioned that this version of the iconic villain was "one of those people that has music in him". In regards to the musical treatment she had crafted, Hildur made mention of how it was a large part of the process of how the film grew, as it was played both on set and for Phoenix to listen to in-ear, with the composer stating: "The music seemed to affect his movements and his acting, as well as the pacing. This was a very inspiring and fun approach to take because then you get to work together, creating the musical world of the film in tandem".

=== Recording ===
Hildur wished to expand simple and monotonic melodies within the orchestration around Joker's evolution not with chords or any complicated music, but instead with texture that she felt resonated with the melancholia of this Arthur. She described her reaction to Arthur's metamorphosis dance as being similar to when she found his notes and tonality, whilst adding that the theme - Bathroom Dance was performed on an electric cello instrument called the halldorophone, which Hildur helped develop: "It's a feedback instrument [...] A lot of the electronic sounds that you hear in the score, it's all performed live, and it's all coming from that instrument and the connection with the amplifiers". Additionally, she also coined the concept that the orchestra would represent the madness building inside Arthur's mind: "The very beginning piece, you almost only hear the cello [...] As we get further into the movie, the orchestra gets louder and louder, and then it kind of suffocates the cello. It's almost like the empathy that we have for his character is led by the cello, and then his darker side, his inner turmoil, is the orchestra [which is] almost inaudible, and then just slowly takes over as we get further in".

She slowly built the orchestration around the cello, having it faintly linger in the background like a ghost before coming to the forefront as the Joker persona takes command, at the DiMenna Center for one week with initially 36 musicians, thereafter recording with 72 musicians. The percussion started off slowly in a two-note and then strengthens, from Hildur's words: "[...] pounding like his heartbeat. So I couldn't use any cool, complicated beats. This was really simple and to the point and then it gets louder and louder". Whilst recording the orchestra, Hildur felt the energy of the room being very tense and wired. She spoke of the musicians having to play so quietly, thus through a lot of the recording, one could hear very delicate sounds almost inaudible, in which she states: "You'd have 100 people, like, holding their breaths while they played [...] It was incredible, incredible. The energy of a performance or music is so much more important than the music being perfectly played or refined. Even though you don't hear 100 people holding their breaths, there's so much invisible energy that goes into the recording that it is very present [...] It's kind of the magic of music: all these invisible things you can't pinpoint or know". Hildur concluded that she wished for the final act to be big, grand and cinematic, in which she felt Arthur needed this grand exit out of the film - including variations on the themes that have been going on throughout the film. She made mention of the 100-piece orchestra, and that many people don't realise the orchestra had been playing throughout the whole film, even in the beginning: "You mostly hear one cello playing when he's by the bins with the kids, but it's actually a whole orchestra playing behind the cello. It's mixed in a way that you hear the ghost presence of the orchestra". Murray spoke of his collaboration with director Phillips and film editor Jeff Groth, how they used effects in conjunction with composer Hildur Guðnadóttir's score to enhance the tension in the film, and how Foley, field recordings, and loop group added distinctive texture to the soundtrack.

== Release ==
WaterTower Music released the official soundtrack album for Joker, as a digital download on September 27, 2019. They later released a picture disc and coloured vinyl editions of the soundtrack on December 13. The purple disc sports the character's signature color and the second features a picture disc which showcases Joaquin Phoenix in his full clown makeup. On the day of the album's launch, Hildur posted of the release on Twitter, in which she remarked: "Internet world, it's out!! After living with Joker for over a year and half, his music is finally ready come out and meet you! From the bottom of my heart I´d like to thank everyone who lent their talents to this music, It takes a village to complete a project of this size!"

== Track listing ==
=== CD version ===
All tracks are written by Hildur Guðnadóttir.

No.	Title	Length
1.	"Hoyt's Office"	1:24
2.	"Defeated Clown"	2:39
3.	"Following Sophie"	1:33
4.	"Penny in the Hospital"	1:18
5.	"Young Penny"	2:01
6.	"Meeting Bruce Wayne"	4:35
7.	"Hiding in the Fridge"	1:23
8.	"A Bad Comedian"	1:28
9.	"Arthur Comes to Sophie"	1:39
10.	"Looking for Answers"	0:51
11.	"Penny Taken to the Hospital"	1:49
12.	"Subway"	3:33
13.	"Bathroom Dance"	2:08
14.	"Learning How to Act Normal"	1:17
15.	"Confession"	1:29
16.	"Escape from the Train"	2:31
17.	"Call Me Joker"	4:48
Total length:		36:26

=== Songs from Live! With Murray Franklin ===
All tracks are performed by Ellis Drane and His Jazz Orchestra.

Disc 1
No.	Title	Length
1.	"The Live! with Murray Franklin Theme" (Judson Crane, Mark Hollingsworth, Bill O'Connell)	0:51
2.	"If You're Happy and You Know It" (Joe Raposo feat: Chaim Tenenbaum)	1:23
3.	"That's Life [Instrumental Version]" (Kelly Gordon and Dean K. Thompson)	2:49
4.	"Smile [Instrumental Version]" (Charlie Chaplin, Geoffrey Parsons, James Turner)	0:33
Total length:		4:56

=== Film music not included on the album ===
#	Title	Performer(s)/Writer(s)	Key Scenes/Notes	Ref.
1	"Send In the Clowns"	Frank Sinatra	The three Wayne Enterprise businessmen sing this song on the subway, and Frank Sinatra's rendition plays over Joker's end credits.	
2	"Everybody Plays the Fool"	The Main Ingredient	Randall lends Arthur his gun at work.	
3	"If You're Happy and You Know It"	Chaim Tenenbaum	Arthur entertains the children at the hospital.	
4	"Here Comes the King"	Steve Karmen	Playing on the TV when Arthur arrives home.	
5	"Slap That Bass"	Fred Astaire	The film Shall We Dance (1937) is playing on TV as Arthur toys with the gun.	
6	"My Name Is Carnival"	Jackson C. Frank	Arthur packs his things from work as he tells the co-workers that the gun belongs to Randall.	
7	"Rooftop"	Hildur Guðnadóttir and Jóhann Jóhannsson from Mary Magdalene (2018)	Arthur sees himself in Murray's audience.	
8	"The Moon Is a Silver Dollar"	Lawrence Welk and His Orchestra	Arthur walks back to his apartment after meeting Sophie, and continues playing on the radio as Arthur washes Penny in the bathtub.	
9	"Temptation Rag"	Claude Bolling	A man plays this song on the piano on the streets as Arthur twirls the sign.	
10	"Smile"	Jimmy Durante	After Arthur's first performance as a stand up comedian.	
11	"That's Life"	Frank Sinatra	Plays while Arthur is dying his hair that iconic shade of green, and appears when Arthur runs down the halls of Arkham.	
12	"Rock and Roll Part 2"	Gary Glitter	Heard as Arthur, in his full Joker ensemble, struts and dances down a large staircase on his way to make his late night debut.	
13	"Spanish Flea"	Ray Davies and His Button Down Brass	The composition plays with the Indian-head test pattern when the broadcast of the Murray Franklin Show gets taken off air.	
14	"White Room"	Cream	Joker is taken by the police's car and driven on the city streets, before the car crash, where he is rescued by the mob.	
15	"Murray's Theme"	Judson Crane and Mark S. Hollingsworth	Murray Franklin enters the scene, live on television.	
16	"Murray's Late Night"	Bill O'Connell	The theme for Murray Franklin's late night show.	

An edited version of The Guess Who's "Laughing" in an Instagram post by film director Todd Phillips as foreground music of a camera test for Joker, which offered the first look of Phoenix in makeup.

== Personnel credits ==
Credits adapted from CD liner notes.

All music composed by Hildur Guðnadóttir

- Producers: Hildur Guðnadóttir, Sam Slater
- Executive album producer: Todd Phillips
- Executive in charge of music for Warner Bros. Pictures: Niki Sherrod
- Executive in charge of WaterTower Music: Jason Linn
- Music supervisors: Randall Poster, George Drakoulias
- Additional production: Gunnar Tynes
- Additional arrangements: Þórarinn Guðnason
- Executive score producer: Jason Ruder
- Music business affairs executive: Ray Gonzalez
- Art direction: Sandeep Sriram
- Soundtrack coordinator: Linda Christie
- Orchestrators: Andrew Kinney, Phillip Klein, Carl Rydlund
- Orchestra conducted by Jeff Atmajian
- Score recorded at The DiMenna Center
- Score mixed by Daniel Kresco
- Assistant engineer: Jeff Citron
- Nate "NV" Eaton studio assistant: Juan Simon Fernández
- Transcription by Black Ribbon Pro
- Score mixed at Downtown Music, New York City, New York
- Berlin assistants: Rick Vincent Will, Henrik Havelka
- New York recording engineers: Alex Vengeur, Tim Machiafava
- New York recording engineer: Alex Vengeur, Tim Machiafava, Neal Shaw, Matt Soares, Brandon Chevere
- New York assistant engineers: Neal Shaw, Matt Soares, Brandon Chevere, Carlos Mora, Phil Weinrobe

Featured instrumentalists

- Halldorophone: Hildur Guðnadóttir
- Voice: Hildur Guðnadóttir
- Cello: Hildur Guðnadóttir
- Percussion: Hildur Guðnadóttir
- Musical Sound Design: Sam Slater
- Percussion: Sam Slater
- Programming: Sam Slater
- Additional musical sound design: Gunnar Tynes
- Synths: Gunnar Tynes
- Programming: Gunnar Tynes
- Additional musical sound design: Þórarinn Guðnason
- Viola: Viktor Orri Árnason
- Violin: Viktor Orri Árnason
- Viola: Eyvind Kang
- Violin: Eyvind Kang
- Cello: Clarice Jenson
- Double bass: Yair Elazar Glotman
- Double bass: Miller Wrenn
- Percussion: Ólafur Björn Ólafsson
- Polyend: Simon Goff, Antonio Pulli:

Woodwind

- Flute: Diva Goodfriend, Mindy Kaufman, Kathleen Nester, Tara Helen O'Connor, Tanya Witek
- Clarinet: Liam Burke, David Gould, Bohdan Hilash, Dean LeBlanc, Pavel Vinnitsky
- Bassoon: Gil DeJean, Billy Hestand, Harrison Miller, Damian Primis, Mark Romatz, Dan Shelly
- Horn: Barbara Jöstlein, Will de Vos, Javier Gandara, Brad Gemeinhardt, Kyle Hoyt, Aaron Korn, Jenny Ney, Theo Primis, Erik Ralske, Anne Scharer, Leelanee Sterrett, Dan Wions, Chad Yarbrough

Strings

- Violin: Peter Bahng, Tallie Brunfelt, Kelly Cho, Julia Choi, Daniel Constant, Monica Davis, Katherine Fong, Laura Frautschi, Margaret Gould, Kristi Helberg, Ming Hsin, Nanae Iwata, Dasol Jeong, Amy Kauffman, Sarah Kenner, Lisa Kim, Lisa G. Kim, Krzysztof Kuznik, Lisa Lee, Ann Lehmann, Francis Liu, Kuan Cheng Lu, Joanna Maurer, Yuri Namkung, Suzanne Ornstein, Cecee Pantikian, Jessica Park, Ragga Petursdottir, Annaliesa Place, Emily Popham, Sarah Pratt, Wen Qian, Derek Ratzenboeck, Theresa Salomon, Gabriel Schaff, Cathy Sim, David Southorn, Na Sun, Emma Sutton, Henry Wang, Savion Washington, Sharon Yamada, Jung Sun Yoo, Robin Zeh
- Viola: Matthew Beaugé, Caleb Burhans, Junah Chung, Desiree Elsevier, Danielle Farina, Nikki Federman, Will Frampton, Mary Hammann, Celia Hatton, Hung-Wei Huang, Conway Kuo, Natalia Lipkina, Todd Low, Jessica Meyer, Ken Mirkin, Nick Revel, Dov Scheindlin, Alissa Smith, Arnie Tanimoto, Jessica Troy
- Cello: Robert Burkhart, Gabriel Cabezas, Amanda Gookin, Clarice Jensen, Ana Kim, Christine Kim, Maureen McDermott, Joel Noyes, Sarah Seiver, Sophie Shao, Aaron Stokes, Caitlin Sullivan, Wendy Sutter, Oliver Weston, Allen Whear
- Bass: Gregg August, David Grossman, Lou Kosma, Daniel Krekeler, Jeremy McCoy, Satoshi Okamoto, John Patitucci, Troy Rinker, Dave Romano, Rion Wentworth

Brass

- Bass trombone: Marco Gomez, Kyle Mendiguchia
- Trombone: Demian Austin, Richard Harris, Sasha Romero, Brian Santero
- Tuba: Andy Bove

Special acknowledgement

- Peter Axelrad, Maria Belli, Paul Broucek, Rocco Carrozza, Vincenzo De La Rosa, Joe Kara, Kevin Kertes, Katie Lambert, Genevieve Morris, Ari Taitz, Robert Zick

== Charts ==
=== Album ===
Chart (2019–2020)	Peak position
Belgian Albums (Ultratop Wallonia)	124
Belgian Albums (Ultratop Flanders)	125
French Albums (SNEP)	168
Spanish Albums (PROMUSICAE)	79
Swiss Albums (Schweizer Hitparade)	23
UK Independent Albums (OCC)	45
UK Soundtrack Albums (OCC)	11
UK Independent Album Breakers (OCC)	11
US Soundtrack Albums (Billboard)	19
US Top Independent Albums (Billboard)	41
US Top Current Albums (Billboard)	98

=== Singles ===
Year	Song	Peak position
2019	"Bathroom Dance" (Scala) (Hildur Guðnadóttir)	1
2019	"Call Me Joker" (Scala) (Hildur Guðnadóttir)	2
2019	"Penny in the Hospital" (Classic FM) (Hildur Guðnadóttir)	1

== Reception ==
=== Immediate reception ===
The score was widely admired and thought of as a contender for the Academy Award for Best Original Score at the 92nd Academy Awards, with Warner Bros. releasing Guðnadóttir's score as part of the For Your Consideration campaign aimed towards members of awards voting groups such as that of the Academy Awards, and the Hollywood Foreign Press of the Golden Globes.

=== Critical reception ===
Professional ratings
Review scores
Source	Rating
Filmtracks	1/5 stars
Movie Music UK	5/5 stars
Sci-Fi Bulletin	10/10
Joshua Valour	8/10
The Film Magazine	10/10

The score received critical acclaim. Mark Kermode of The Observer spoke highly of Joker's score, stating that "[...] Guðnadóttir's brilliantly brooding score seems to throb up from the pavements of these mean streets, full of ominous low strings and prowling bass growls – doom-laden voices prophesying war". David Rooney of The Hollywood Reporter wrote that "all this is rendered even darker by the disquietingly melancholy mood of Hildur Gudnadóttir's brooding orchestral score, which cranks up into thunderous drama as the chaos escalates". Kyle Smith of The National Review described the score as "spectacular". Kayleigh Donaldson of Syfy described Gudnadóttir's score as "beautifully haunting", whilst remarking: "[...] such a refreshing change from the frequently derivative music heard in comic book movies". Terri White of Empire wrote: "Mention must be made of Joker's cello score by [Guðnadóttir] — mournful, dark and fractured [...]" The Economic Times commented that "accompanying the visuals is an amazing sound design, Hildur Guðnadóttir's soulful background score and powerful music pieces".

Antonio Morales of The Santa Barbara Independent spoke highly of the score, to which he remarked: "The music score complements the immense levels of suspense, paralleling the deterioration of Fleck's well-being". Adam Chitwood of Collider praised the score: "[Guðnadóttir's] original score is haunting, beautiful, and at times downright terrifying—it's one of the best of the year".

John Lewis of The Guardian wrote: "The soundtrack for the film Joker is a fine showcase for Icelandic composer [Guðnadóttir]. While not as formally innovative as her claustrophobic score to HBO's Chernobyl (which cleverly manipulated ambient noises that she recorded in a derelict power plant), this terrifying collection works as unorthodox cello concerto, the growling cello set against Bollywood-style slurring violins and dissonant vocals". James Morton of Impact wrote: "The score by [Guðnadóttir] is reminiscent of Jocelyn Pook's music for Kubrick's Eyes Wide Shut (1999), though deeper and slower burning. Both films involve a form of altered reality: dreaming and psychosis". Jerilyn Jordan of Metro Times wrote: "[...] Phoenix's performance could not function without cellist and composer [Guðnadóttir's] indelible score, which presents itself immediately as one of the movie's most important characters and does a great deal of heavy lifting in terms of telling the real story behind Phoenix's gaze".

For Film Ireland, Michael Lee stated: "[...] all this is elevated by Hildur Guonadottir's menacing score, which seemingly ignites the embers raging within Arthur's heart". At The East Bay Express, Kelly Vance described Guðnadóttir's composition as a "[...] hypnotically evocative music score". Critic James Verniere for The Boston Herald wrote: "The film's plaintive music by [Guðnadóttir], another departure from usual, is a huge part of the impact of Joker". André Hereford at Metro Weekly stated that "there isn't a bum performance in the movie, and composer [...] Guðnadóttir's strings-laden score sounds especially attuned to every one of them. There's even a mini-theme for Gotham's billionaire industrialist, and potential mayoral candidate, Thomas Wayne, father of Bruce". Chuck Koplinski at Illinois Times praised Phillips' usage of Guðnadóttir's "thunderous score", allowing it to underscore the obvious betokens no great faith in the audience's ability to keep up.

=== Accolades ===
Award	Date of ceremony	Category	Recipient(s)	Result	Ref.
Academy Awards	February 9, 2020	Best Original Score	Hildur Guðnadóttir	Won	
British Academy Film Awards	February 2, 2020	Best Original Score	Hildur Guðnadóttir	Won	
Critics' Choice Movie Awards	January 12, 2020	Best Score	Hildur Guðnadóttir	Won	
Florida Film Critics Circle	December 23, 2019	Best Score	Hildur Guðnadóttir	Nominated	
Georgia Film Critics Association	January 10, 2020	Best Original Score	Hildur Guðnadóttir	Nominated	
Gold Derby Awards	February 4, 2020	Best Score	Hildur Guðnadóttir	Won	
Golden Globe Awards	January 5, 2020	Best Original Score	Hildur Guðnadóttir	Won	
Grammy Award	March 14, 2021	Best Score Soundtrack for Visual Media	Hildur Guðnadóttir	Won	
Grammy Award	March 14, 2021	Best Arrangement, Instrumental or A Cappella	Hildur Guðnadóttir (for "Bathroom Dance")	Nominated	
Hollywood Critics Association	January 9, 2020	Best Original Score	Hildur Guðnadóttir	Won	
Hollywood Music in Media Awards	November 20, 2019	Best Score in a Feature Film	Hildur Guðnadóttir	Won	
Houston Film Critics Society	January 2, 2020	Best Original Score	Hildur Guðnadóttir	Nominated	
International Film Music Critics Association	February 20, 2020	Film Score of the Year	Joker	Nominated	
International Film Music Critics Association	February 20, 2020	Film Composer of the Year	Hildur Guðnadóttir	Nominated	
International Film Music Critics Association	February 20, 2020	Best Original Score for a Drama Film	Joker	Nominated	
International Film Music Critics Association	February 20, 2020	Film Music Composition of the Year	Call Me Joker	Nominated	
Online Film Critics Society	January 6, 2020	Best Original Score	Hildur Guðnadóttir	Nominated	
San Diego Film Critics Society	December 9, 2019	Best Use of Music	Hildur Guðnadóttir	Nominated	
San Francisco Bay Area Film Critics Circle	December 16, 2019	Best Original Score	Hildur Guðnadóttir	Nominated	
Satellite Awards	December 19, 2019	Best Original Score	Hildur Guðnadóttir	Won	
Seattle Film Critics Society	December 16, 2019	Best Original Score	Hildur Guðnadóttir	Nominated	
Venice Film Festival	September 7, 2019	Premio Soundtrack Stars Award	Hildur Guðnadóttir	Won	
Washington D.C. Area Film Critics Association	December 8, 2019	Best Score	Hildur Guðnadóttir	Nominated	
