= Afrodisiac (The Main Ingredient album) =

Studio album by the Main Ingredient
- Released: 1973
- Recorded: 1973
- Studio: RCA's Studio D, New York City
- Genre: Soul
- Length: 39:11
- Label: RCA
- Producer: Tony Silvester, Luther Simmons, Cuba Gooding, Sr.

The Main Ingredient chronology
Bitter Sweet (1972)	Afrodisiac (1973)	Euphrates River (1974)

Professional ratings
Review scores
Source	Rating
Allmusic	3/5 stars

Afrodisiac is the fifth studio album by American R&B group the Main Ingredient. Released in 1973 by RCA Records, the album features several songs written or co-written by Stevie Wonder.

== Track listing ==
Side one
No.	Title	Writer(s)	Length
1.	"Superwoman"	Stevie Wonder	3:15
2.	"Where Were You When I Needed You"	Wonder	4:09
3.	"I Am Yours"	Wonder, Syreeta Wright	4:08
4.	"Work to Do"	Ronald Isley, O'Kelly Isley Jr., Rudolph Isley	3:18
5.	"Girl Blue"	Wonder, Yvonne Wright	4:21

Side two
No.	Title	Writer(s)	Length
6.	"You Can Call Me Rover"	Ken Williams, J. R. Bailey, Mel Kent	3:26
7.	"Something 'Bout Love"	Wonder	4:22
8.	"Love of My Life"	George Clinton	3:30
9.	"Something Lovely"	Wonder, S. Wright	3:12
10.	"Goodbye My Love"	Luther Maxwell	4:50

== Personnel ==
- Bert De Coteaux - arranger, conductor
- Buzz Willis - production supervisor
- Acy R. Lehman - art direction
- Nick Sangiamo - photography

== Charts ==
Chart (1973)	Peak
Billboard Pop Albums	132
Billboard Top Soul Albums	16

Singles

Year	Single	Peak
Year	Single	US R&B
1973	"You Can Call Me Rover"	34
1973	"Girl Blue"	51
