= Euphrates River (album) =

Studio album by the Main Ingredient
- Released: 1974
- Recorded: 1974
- Genre: Funk
- Label: RCA
- Producers: Tony Silvester, Luther Simmons, Cuba Gooding, Sr.

The Main Ingredient chronology
Afrodisiac (1973)	Euphrates River (1974)	Rolling Down a Mountainside (1975)

Singles from Euphrates River
- 1. "Just Don't Want to Be Lonely" Released: January 1974; 2. "Happiness Is Just Around the Bend" Released: June 1974; 3. "California My Way" Released: October 1974

Professional ratings
Review scores
Source	Rating
Allmusic	4/5 stars

Euphrates River is the sixth album by American singing group he Main Ingredient. Released in 1974, the album charted at number 8 on the Soul albums chart in the U.S.

== Release history ==
In addition to the standard 2 channel stereo version, the album was also released in a 4 channel quadraphonic version in 1976. The quad LP was encoded using the Compatible Discrete 4 system.

This album was reissued in the UK on the Super Audio CD format in 2016 by Dutton Vocalion. The release contains both the stereo and quad mixes.

== Track listing ==
Side one
No.	Title	Writer(s)	Length
1.	"Euphrates"	James Seals, Dash Crofts	4:44
2.	"Have You Ever Tried It"	Nickolas Ashford, Valerie Simpson	3:06
3.	"Summer Breeze"	James Seals, Dash Crofts	4:16
4.	"California My Way"	Willie Hutch	4:36

Side two
No.	Title	Writer(s)	Length
5.	"Happiness Is Just Around the Bend"	Brian Auger	6:20
6.	"Looks Like Rain"	Alzo Fronte	3:17
7.	"Don't You Worry 'bout a Thing"	Stevie Wonder	4:04
8.	"Just Don't Want to Be Lonely"	Vinnie Barrett, John Freeman, Bobby Eli	3:32

== Charts ==
Chart (1974)	Peak
Billboard Pop Albums	52
Billboard Top Soul Albums	8

Singles

Year	Single	Peak chart positions	
Year	Single	US	US R&B
1974	"Just Don't Want to Be Lonely"	10	8
1974	"Happiness Is Just Around the Bend"	35	7
1974	"California My Way"	75	48
