= Halldorophone =

Electroacoustic musical instrument

halldorophone
- A 2018 halldorophone with a combined neck and fingerboard in cast aluminium.

Electronic instrument
- Hornbostel–Sachs classification: 513 (Electrophone)
- Inventor: Halldór Úlfarsson
- Developed: 2008

The halldorophone (/ˈhældɔːrɔːfoʊn/; also known as the dorophone, and dórófónn in Icelandic) is a cello-like electronic instrument created by artist and designer Halldór Úlfarsson. The halldorophone is designed specifically to feedback the strings, making use of the phenomenon of positive feedback to incite the strings to drone. The instrument gained some recognition in early 2020 when composer Hildur Guðnadóttir won the Academy Award for her original soundtrack to the movie Joker, some of which was composed with a halldorophone.

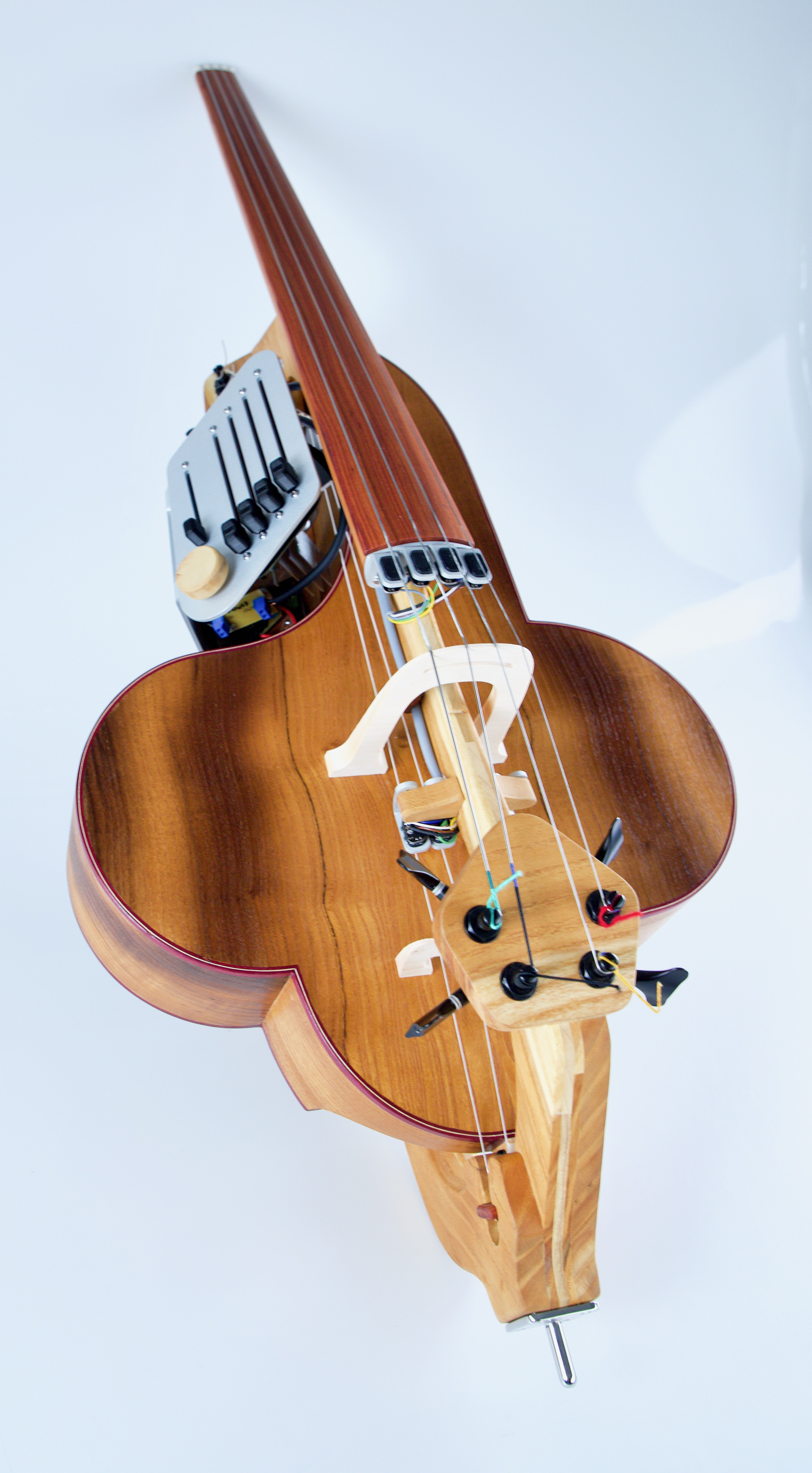
A halldorophone owned by the Iceland University of the Arts. It was commissioned by the Design Fund in Iceland and gifted on January 17th 2022.

== Operating principles ==
The halldorophone is an electroacoustic instrument that makes use of positive feedback as a key element in generating its sound. The player takes a sitting position behind the instruments and plays it a similar way as they would a cello. The instrument is predicated on audio feedback that is generated when sound picked up by a microphone (or comparable device) is passed to a speaker and then re-detected by the microphone. It causes amplification in the system and a sustained, recursive signal flow is created; a positive feedback loop. According to its creator Halldór Úlfarsson, the halldorophone is designed to distill feedback as its core identity, making it a fundamental compositional element rather than a by-product.

In the words of composer Nicole Robson: "The halldorophone utilises a simple system, whereby the vibration of each string is detected by a pickup, amplified and routed to a speaker embedded in the back of the instrument. By adding gain to individual strings in the feedback loop, the instrument's response can become rapidly complex, potentially spinning out of control. While every musical performance of a piece is unique in some way and contingent on its particular moment and situation in time, the unstable nature of the halldorophone exacerbates this condition."

Electronics engineer Orfeas Moraitis who has worked on halldorophone electronics with Halldor Ulfarsson since 2018 recorded an instructional video for an experimental version of the instrument at Elektronmusikstudion in Stockholm at the start of summer in 2022 at the occasion of the instrument being on loan to EMS and available to users along with other studio instruments and equipment.

== Uses ==
=== Concert music ===
A number of pieces have been composed and performed for solo halldorophone, halldorophone in duet with a second instrument, and with ensemble.

Several composers of the Icelandic S.L.Á.T.U.R. collective have used halldorophones in their works after the Hljóðheimar exhibition in Reykjavík 2011.

Hafdís Bjarnadóttir's piece "A Day in February", for halldorophone and accordion, was nominated by the Icelandic National Broadcasting Service for the International Rostrum of Composers in Vienna in 2011.

Timothy Page premiered "Toccata" for halldorophone, clarinet, and electronics at the 2012 Nordic Music Days in Stockholm.

The Icelandic composer Guðmundur Steinn Gunnarsson wrote a suite for solo halldorophone, Hafið og Örninn, which premiered at the 2015 Hljóðön concert series by the Finnish cellist Markus Hohti. His chamber opera Einvaldsóður, which premiered on Sláturtíð 2017, makes extended use of the halldorophone in a chamber music context. It was selected as one of the top 5 pieces of its decade in Aesthetics for Birds.

Secondson, an artist from the United Kingdom, performed with the halldorophone at The National Museum of Wales for an improvised performance including Cian Ciaran and The Gentle Good on 19 August 2019. It was the first live performance with a halldorophone in the United Kingdom.

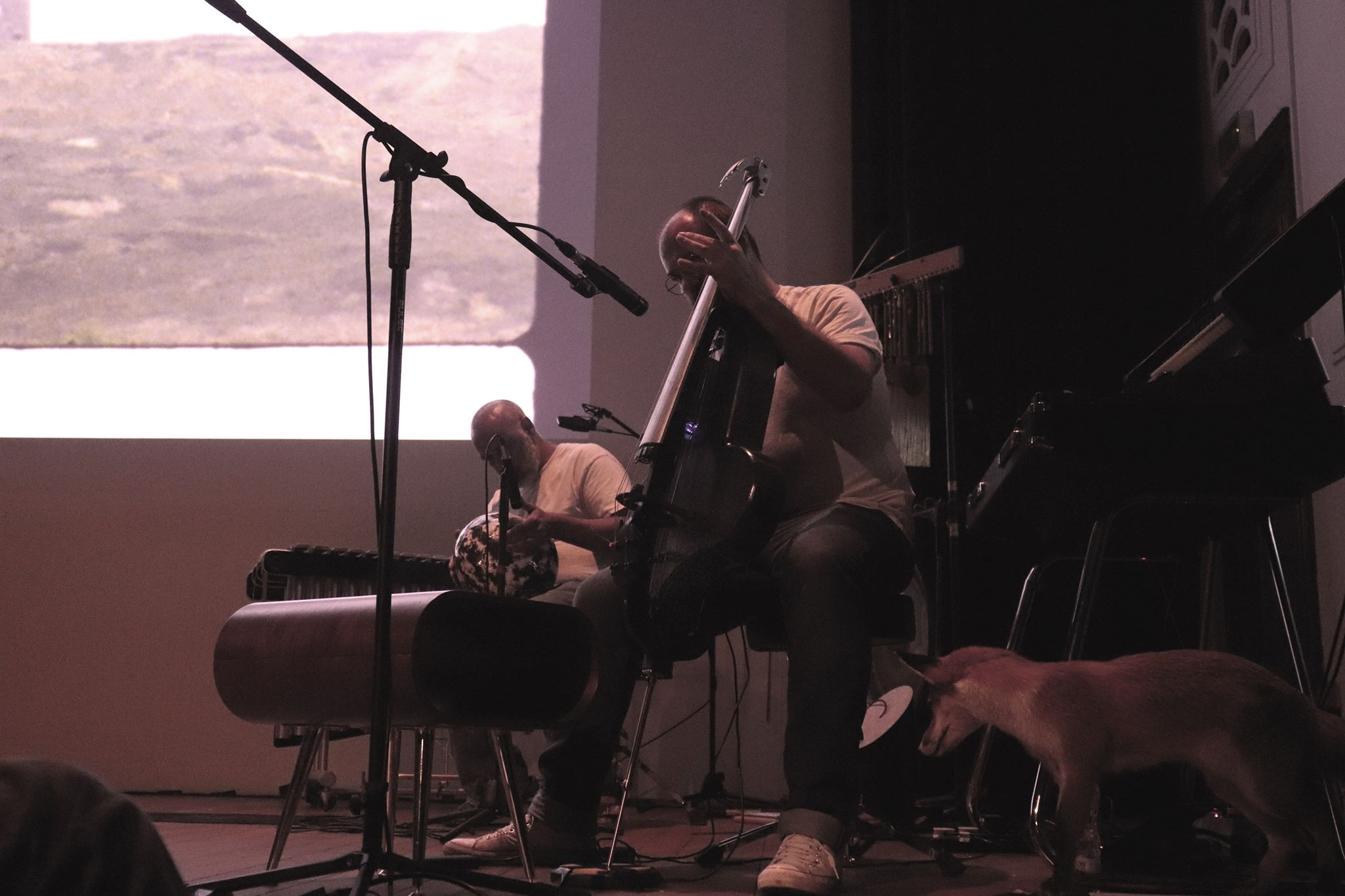
Secondson plays halldorophone at the first live performance in the United Kingdom involving the instrument

Nicole Robson, of the United Kingdom, performed a study for solo halldorophone "Dual/duel/duet/for/with/halldorophone" at the New Interfaces for Musical Expression conference in 2020.

Swedish composer Johan Svensson has composed two works for halldorophone and a second instrument.

In December 2021, Mason Cook, Sherry Gao, and Forrest Love, music composition students under the tutelage of Adam Schoenberg at Occidental College, debuted a series of new works for the halldorophone, which the college had acquired earlier that year. This was the first time that the halldorophone had been showcased in the Americas. Schoenberg would later use the same instrument from Occidental College in May 2022, at a Latin American-themed festival by the Louisville Orchestra in Kentucky, where he premiered his piece "Automation". It is a double concerto for orchestra, cello, and a custom built halldorophone. The conductor, Teddy Abrams, said using the electronic instrument was in keeping with the energy of the city and the orchestra's history: both daring and adventurous.

=== Film music ===
In 2016, composer Jóhann Jóhannsson recorded Hildur Guðnadóttir playing halldorophone for his score of the motion picture Arrival.

In 2018, Icelandic composer Hildur Guðnadóttir scored the film Sicario: Day of the Soldado using a halldorophone, which she claimed was her main instrument at the time. She called the instrument an "electro-acoustic feedback monster" and a "Jimi Hendrix cello".

In 2019, Hildur Guðnadóttir played and composed the original soundtrack to the movie Joker using a halldorophone. The score won the Academy Award for Best Original Score the following year.

=== Studio recordings ===
The halldorophone's recorded output spans film scoring, drone metal, electroacoustic composition, and experimental pop, reflecting both the instrument's versatility and its gradual spread through international composer networks. Its earliest high-profile appearances were in film music: in 2016 Hildur Guðnadóttir played halldorophone on Jóhann Jóhannsson's score for Arrival, and she went on to use it as a primary instrument on her own scores for the HBO miniseries Chernobyl (2019), Sicario: Day of the Soldado (2018), and Joker (2019), the last of which won the Academy Award for Best Original Score. This sequence of high-profile credits brought the instrument to wider public attention.

From 2022, a halldorophone was made available to visiting composers at Elektronmusikstudion (EMS) in Stockholm, where it became one of the studio's most frequently requested instruments. Over the following two years more than a dozen composers booked residencies specifically to work with it, several of which resulted in released recordings — among them Penelope Trappes, Martina Bertoni, Kirin McElwain, Simon Pomery, and Jana Irmert, all of whom worked with the EMS instrument and released albums directly connected to that work. UK musician Secondson has produced more halldorophone recordings than any other single artist, with five releases between 2019 and 2024, all on SFDB Records.

| Year | Title | Artist / Performer | Label | Notes |
|---|---|---|---|---|
| 2016 | Arrival: Original Motion Picture Soundtrack | Jóhann Jóhannsson feat. Hildur Guðnadóttir | Deutsche Grammophon | Guðnadóttir credited as performing cello, halldorophone (dórophone), and voice |
| 2018 | Sicario: Day of the Soldado | Hildur Guðnadóttir | Milan Records | Guðnadóttir described the halldorophone as her main instrument at this time, calling it an "electro-acoustic feedback monster" and a "Jimi Hendrix cello" |
| 2019 | Chernobyl | Hildur Guðnadóttir | Deutsche Grammophon / WaterTower Music | Emmy Award–winning score for the HBO miniseries; halldorophone credited in liner notes |
| 2019 | Joker: Original Motion Picture Soundtrack | Hildur Guðnadóttir | WaterTower Music | Won the Academy Award for Best Original Score (2020) |
| 2019 | Life Metal | Sunn O))); halldorophone by Hildur Guðnadóttir | Southern Lord | Recorded by Steve Albini at Electrical Audio, Chicago; halldorophone featured on "Between Sleipnir's Breaths" and "Novæ" |
| 2019 | Tónlist frá: hér að neðan | Secondson | SFDB Records | Score featuring halldorophone and Yamaha CS60; released 1 October 2019 |
| 2019 | I'r Mynydd | Secondson | SFDB Records | Solo halldorophone album; released 28 October 2019 |
| 2020 | Love Life (EP) | Cryptochrome | Self-released | Icelandic electronic collective; halldorophone on the track "Kali"; released 2 February 2020 |
| 2020 | Halldorotones | Various | Broken Strings Music / Extreme Music (Lab Rat Recordings) | Collection of short pieces for solo halldorophone |
| 2021 | Suite for Halldorophone and Synthi A (EP) | Secondson | SFDB Records | 21-minute ascending drone piece for halldorophone and EMS Synthi A; released 8 February 2021 |
| 2021 | Battlefield 2042 (Original Soundtrack) | Hildur Guðnadóttir | EA Music / DICE | Video game score; released 10 September 2021 |
| date unknown | My Sorrow's Rage | Temor | Unknown | Greek melodic death-black metal; halldorophone performed by Konstantinos Chinis |
| 2022 | Any Other Place | Secondson | SFDB Records | Recorded in the crypt of the Temple of Peace, Cardiff; released 10 March 2022 |
| 2023 | Time Piece | Jana Irmert | Longform Editions | 36-minute single-track piece; halldorophone combined with EMS modular synthesizers and coral reef hydrophone field recordings; released 12 June 2023 |
| 2024 | Hommelen | Penelope Trappes | Paralaxe Editions | Four drone pieces recorded in a single take at EMS Stockholm, December 2023; released 7 June 2024 |
| 2024 | Now I Know My Name (halldorophone) | Secondson | SFDB Records | 8-track album; released 2 June 2024 |
| 2025 | The Gospel of Feedback | Þuríður Jónsdóttir & Júlía Mogensen (prod. President Bongo) | Radio Bongo | Two-track LP ("1943" and "1944", each ~18 min); both performers play halldorophone; includes saga text by Ófeigur Sigurðsson; supported by Halldór Úlfarsson; released 27 February 2025 |
| 2025 | Electroacoustic Works for Halldorophone | Martina Bertoni | Karlrecords | Recorded at EMS Stockholm, November 2023; released 21 February 2025. A Dolby Atmos edition was released in February 2026. |
| 2025 | Youth | Kirin McElwain | AKP Recordings | Debut LP; halldorophone recorded at EMS Stockholm, May 2023; released 10 October 2025 |
| 2025 | Skin String Sine | Simon Pomery | The Wormhole (Touch/Fairwood Music) | Debut LP; halldorophone recorded at EMS Stockholm; bonus live EP includes a piece subtitled Figures for One Piano and Two Halldorophones; released 19 September 2025 |
| 2025 | Osmium | OSMIUM (Hildur Guðnadóttir, James Ginzburg, Rully Shabara, Sam Slater) | Invada Records | Guðnadóttir performs halldorophone throughout; released 20 June 2025 |

=== Video games ===
In 2021, composer Hildur Guðnadóttir composed the video game score for Battlefield 2042 by DICE and EA Games using the halldorophone. The soundtrack was released on 10 September 2021.

=== Festivals ===
In July 2024, the halldorophone was featured at Sónar+D, an international festival exploring the intersection of creativity and technology. As part of the Intelligent Instruments Lab exhibition stand, the instrument was presented with custom DSP running on a built-in Bela microcomputer. Three programs running on the Bela were presented through the duration of the exhibition, developed respectively by composer Davíð Brynjar Franzson and IIL PhD student Victor Shepardson, which set the instrument to play generative compositions autonomously, and a patch developed by the Lab's principal investigator Prof. Thor Magnusson, which modified the behaviour of the halldorophone tailored to his preferences when being played by an instrumentalist.

== History ==
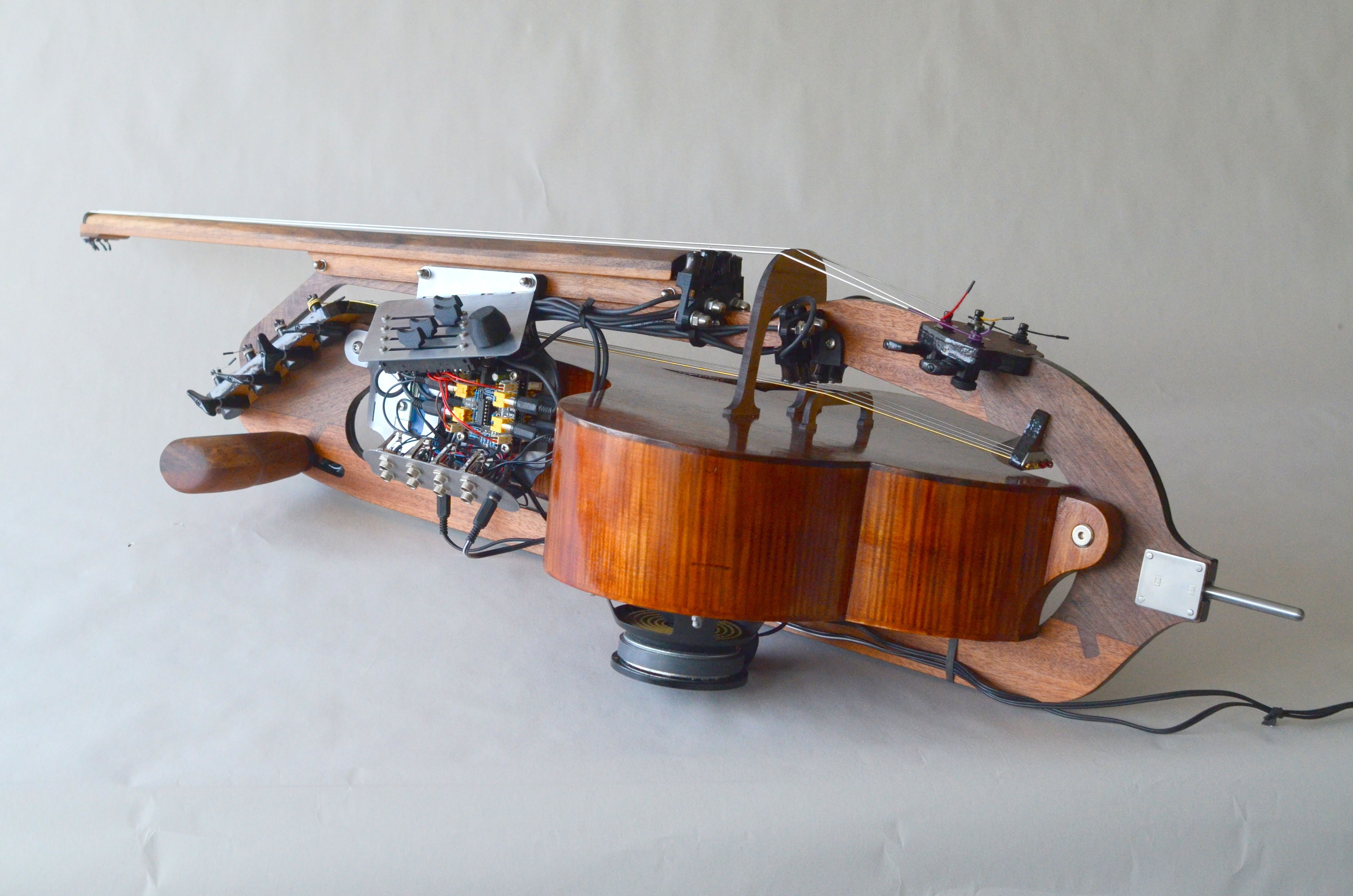
A halldorophone from 2014

The instrument was originally conceived of as a prop for performance art during Halldór Úlfarsson's time as a visual arts student. He says that it began as a joke but in time developed into a functional string instrument for string players interested in working with feedback.

The halldorophone was developed through over a decade-long iterative design process in close dialogue with performers and composers. Each instrument was presented as a fully functional version and entrusted to dedicated artists, not as test subjects but as collaborators who used the halldorophone in serious musical contexts. This informal yet sustained collaboration shaped the instrument's evolving form and expressive capabilities. Rather than following a linear technical development path, the halldorophone's identity emerged through cycles of artistic experimentation, cultural placement, and mutual feedback.

== See also ==
- Cello
- Electroacoustic music
- Feedback (music)
- Hildur Guðnadóttir
- New Interfaces for Musical Expression
