= Bitter Sweet (The Main Ingredient album) =

Studio album by The Main Ingredient
- Released: 1972
- Recorded: 1972
- Studio: RCA's Studio C, New York, New York
- Genre: Soul
- Label: RCA
- Producer: Tony Silvester, Luther Simmons

The Main Ingredient chronology
Black Seeds (1971)	Bitter Sweet (1972)	Afrodisiac (1973)

Professional ratings
Review scores
Source	Rating
Allmusic	3/5 stars

Bitter Sweet is the fourth studio album by The Main Ingredient. Released in 1972 this is the first album to feature lead singer Cuba Gooding, Sr. Includes the top five pop and soul hit single "Everybody Plays the Fool". The song was nominated for a Grammy Award in the category Best R&B Song at the 1973 ceremony.

== Track listing ==
Side one
No.	Title	Writer(s)	Length
1.	"Traveling"	Lucille Jackson	2:59
2.	"Where Are You?"	Harold Adamson, Jimmy McHugh	3:15
3.	"You've Got to Take It (If You Want It)"	Ed Townsend	3:28
4.	"Everybody Plays the Fool"	Rudy Clark, J. R. Bailey, Ken Williams	3:23
5.	"Whirl-Wind"	William Salter, Ralph MacDonald	3:24

Side two
No.	Title	Writer(s)	Length
6.	"Fly Baby Fly"	Bill Robey	3:23
7.	"I Can't See Me Without You"	Rudy Clark, J. R. Bailey, Ken Williams	3:46
8.	"Where Do Broken Hearted Lovers Go?"	Rudy Clark, J. R. Bailey, Ken Williams	2:53
9.	"Who Can I Turn To (When Nobody Needs Me)"	Leslie Bricusse, Anthony Newley	4:48
10.	"No Tears (In the End)"	William Salter, Ralph MacDonald	3:57

== Personnel ==
- Bert De Coteaux - arranger, conductor
- Buzz Willis - production supervisor
- Acy Lehman - art direction
- Nick Sangiamo - photography

== Charts ==
Chart (1972)	Peak
Billboard Pop Albums	79
Billboard Top Soul Albums	10

Singles

Year	Single	Peak chart positions	
Year	Single	US	US R&B
1972	"Everybody Plays the Fool"	3	2
1972	"You've Got to Take It (If You Want It)"	46	18
