= Who Can I Turn To? =

1964 song written by Leslie Bricusse and Anthony Newley

- When Nobody Needs Me
- Occasion: The Roar of the Greasepaint – The Smell of the Crowd
- Written: Anthony Newley and Leslie Bricusse
- Published: 1964
- Vocal: originally Norman Wisdom

Premiere
- Date: 3 August 1964

"Who Can I Turn To?" (alternatively titled "Who Can I Turn To (When Nobody Needs Me)") is a song written by English composer-lyricists Leslie Bricusse and Anthony Newley and first published in 1964.

== Background ==
The song was introduced in the musical The Roar of the Greasepaint – The Smell of the Crowd, which struggled in the United Kingdom in 1964 and then made a tour of the United States later that year.

== Tony Bennett recordings ==
"Who Can I Turn To (When Nobody Needs Me)"

Single by Tony Bennett

from the album Who Can I Turn To
- B-side: "Till The End of Time"
- Released: 15 September 1964
- Recorded: 1964
- Genre: Easy listening
- Length: 2:55
- Label: Columbia
- Composers: Anthony Newley, Leslie Bricusse

Tony Bennett singles chronology
"It's a Sin to Tell a Lie" (1964)	"Who Can I Turn To (When Nobody Needs Me)" (1964)	"If I Ruled the World" (1964)

The song was most successfully recorded by Tony Bennett. "Who Can I Turn To?" became a hit, reaching #33 on the US pop singles chart and the top 5 of the Adult Contemporary chart. So fuelled, the musical arrived on Broadway for a successful run, and the song became one of Bennett's staples. He later re-recorded it as a duet with Queen Latifah in 2011 on Duets II, and with Gloria Estefan for his 2012 album, Viva Duets. Bennett continued to perform the song in concert until his retirement in 2021 at the age of 95.

=== Chart performance ===
Chart (1964)	Peak position
US Billboard Pop-Standard Singles	3
US Billboard Hot 100	33

== Other versions ==
- In 1964, Shirley Bassey released it as a single which charted at #47 in Australia.
- Influential jazz vocalists Carmen McRae released it for her 1965 album, Haven't We Met?.
- In 1965, Astrud Gilberto, for her The Shadow of Your Smile album.
- American tenor Jan Peerce recorded "Who Can I Turn To?" for his 1965 album Pop Goes Peerce.
- Lena Horne on her 1965 album Feelin' Good
- Dionne Warwick, for her 1965 album, The Sensitive Sound of Dionne Warwick. Her version reached #62 pop and #34 R&B.
- The Gerald Wilson Orchestra, for the 1965 album On Stage.
- Wynton Marsalis covered it on his first, eponymous album (1981).
- Dusty Springfield included it on her 1965 album Ev'rything's Coming Up Dusty.
- Andy Williams, on his 1965 album, Andy Williams' Dear Heart.
- Jazz pianist Bill Evans recorded the song, both with his trio (1965) and with Tony Bennett (1976).
- Nancy Wilson, on her 1965 album, Gentle Is My Love.
- Sarah Vaughan covered the song for her album The New Scene (1966)
- Miles Davis second great quintet (sans Ron Carter with bass duties handled by Richard Davis) played the song live at the Oriental Theatre in May 1966. This is the only existing version of the song as played by the quintet and is captured on "Miles Davis Quintet – Live at the Oriental Theatre 1966," released in June 2014.
- David Whitfield included the song on the album The Return of David Whitfield (David Whitfield with Roland Shaw and his Orchestra) London Records PS477, released in 1966.
- The Temptations, on their 1967 album In a Mellow Mood.
- Jazz pianist Bob Neloms recorded a solo-piano version on his 1982 album, Pretty Music.
- The Main Ingredient, for their 1972 album Bitter Sweet; it was also the B-side of the R&B group's biggest hit "Everybody Plays the Fool".
- Australian baritone Anthony Warlow, on his 1994 album Midnight Dreaming.
- Van Morrison included the song on his 1995 album How Long Has This Been Going On, and a live version at his 1997 Montreux Festival appearance has appeared on the deluxe edition of The Healing Game in 2019.
- David Hazeltine, on his 2005 jazz trio album, Modern Standards.
- Tina May, accompanied by pianist Nikki Iles, on her 2006 album A Wing and a Prayer.
- Harry Connick Jr., on his 2009 album, Your Songs.
- Mark Vincent, for his 2010 album Compass
- Della Reese, on her album Della Reese Live in Hollywood in 1966.
- Barbra Streisand, for her 2016 album, Encore: Movie Partners Sing Broadway, as a posthumous duet with original singer and co-songwriter, Anthony Newley.

== Samples ==
- The version recorded by Astrud Gilberto was sampled in the Black Eyed Peas song "Like That" from their album Monkey Business.
