= Cuba Gooding =

Cuba Gooding may refer to:

- Cuba Gooding Sr. (1944–2017), American singer; father of Cuba Gooding Jr.
- Cuba Gooding Jr. (born 1968), American actor; son of Cuba Gooding Sr.
