= Warm Your Heart =

Studio album by Aaron Neville
- Released: June 11, 1991
- Recorded: March 1990 – March 1991
- Studio: Ultrasonic (New Orleans); Conway (Los Angeles); Ocean Way (Los Angeles); Studio F (Los Angeles); Russian Hill Recording (San Francisco); Skywalker Ranch (Marin County)
- Genre: Soul; R&B
- Label: A&M
- Producer: Linda Ronstadt; George Massenburg

Aaron Neville chronology
The Mickey Mouse March (1986)	Warm Your Heart (1991)	The Grand Tour (1993)

Warm Your Heart is a 1991 album released by American R&B/soul singer Aaron Neville. It features the singles "Everybody Plays the Fool", "Somewhere, Somebody" and "Close Your Eyes". The "Close Your Eyes" single also featured album producer Linda Ronstadt on guest vocals. The pair had previously collaborated on the songs "Don't Know Much", "All My Life" and "When Something Is Wrong with My Baby".

== Musicians ==
The album utilizes many guest vocalists, musicians and session musicians. Producer Linda Ronstadt sings on four songs on the album and Grammy Award winning Rita Coolidge sings on three. Other guests include slide guitarist Ry Cooder, saxophonist Plas Johnson, Bob Seger, Dr. John, Bob Glaub and Dean Parks.

== Critical reception ==
Professional ratings
Review scores
Source	Rating
AllMusic	3/5 stars
NME	5/10
Orlando Sentinel	3/5 stars
Rolling Stone	4/5 stars
The Vancouver Sun	3.5/5 stars
The Windsor Star	A

Reception at the time of release was generally good. In their four-star review Rolling Stone said that Neville "must have taken the meaning of the gospel deep into his heart". The New York Times review stated that the "solo album debut of the great New Orleans soul singer has the year's most sublime pop vocals". The album reached number 44 on the American Billboard 200 album chart, and achieved platinum status. In Canada, the album reached number 25 in the Album Charts and achieved gold status.

== Track listing ==
No.	Title	Writer(s)	Length
1.	"Louisiana 1927"	Randy Newman	3:04
2.	"Everybody Plays the Fool"	J.R. Bailey, Rudy Clark, Ken Williams	4:25
3.	"It Feels Like Rain"	John Hiatt	4:56
4.	"Somewhere, Somebody"	Max Gronenthal, Andrew Kastner, Larry John McNally	3:01
5.	"Don't Go, Please Stay"	Burt Bacharach, Bob Hilliard	2:40
6.	"With You in Mind"	Allen Toussaint	3:32
7.	"That's the Way She Loves"	Allen Toussaint	4:45
8.	"Angola Bound"	Aaron Neville, Neville Brothers	4:32
9.	"Close Your Eyes" (duet with Linda Ronstadt)	Chuck Willis	3:10
10.	"La Vie Dansante"	Jimmy Buffett, Will Jennings, Michael Utley	3:21
11.	"Warm Your Heart"	Tom Dowd, Ahmet Ertegün, Jerry Wexler	3:49
12.	"I Bid You Goodnight"	Traditional	4:00
13.	"Ave Maria"	Franz Schubert	4:41

== Personnel ==
- Aaron Neville – vocals
- Brian Stoltz – guitar (tracks 1,3,5–11)
- Bob Glaub – bass (tracks 3–5,8)
- Tony Hall – bass (tracks 1,6,9,10)
- Don Grolnick – keyboards, piano (tracks 1,3,5–7,9–11)
- Carlos Vega – drums (tracks 1,3,5–10,14)

with:

- Linda Ronstadt – duet on "Close Your Eyes", soprano vocals on "Ave Maria", whistling on "Everybody Plays the Fool"
- Rita Coolidge – duet on "La Vie Dansante"
- Jason Neville – rap on "Angola Bound"
- Ry Cooder – guitar, slide guitar on "It Feels Like Rain"
- Dean Parks, David Lindley, Larry Carlton – guitar
- Jimmy Johnson, Daryl Johnson – bass
- Robbie Buchanan – Hammond B-3 organ
- Dr. John – piano, percussion
- Russ Kunkel – drums, programming
- Willie Green – drums
- Bob Seger – percussion, backing vocals
- Cyril Neville – congas
- Plas Johnson – tenor saxophone
- Arnold McCuller, Donny Gerrard, Linda Ronstadt, Renée Armand, Rita Coolidge, Rosemary Butler, Willie Greene Jr., Bobby King, Valerie Carter – backing vocals
- Van Dyke Parks – arrangement on "Louisiana 1927"
- David Campbell – arranger and conductor on "Ave Maria"

Technical

- George Massenburg – recording, mixing
- Chuck Beeson – art direction, design
- John Casado – photography

== Charts ==
Chart performance for Warm Your Heart
Chart (1991)	Peak position
Australian Albums (ARIA)	51
New Zealand Albums (RMNZ)	1
Swedish Albums (Sverigetopplistan)	32
Swiss Albums (Schweizer Hitparade)	12
US Billboard 200	44
