= Chernobyl (soundtrack) =

2019 soundtrack album by Hildur Guðnadóttir

Chernobyl: Music from the Original TV Series

Soundtrack album by Hildur Guðnadóttir
- Released: May 31, 2019
- Recorded: August 2018 – March 2019
- Genre: Dark ambient
- Length: 38:37
- Labels: Deutsche Grammophon; Decca; WaterTower Music
- Producers: Hildur Guðnadóttir; Chris Watson; Owen Roberts; Anusch Alimirzaie; Christian Badzura

Hildur Guðnadóttir chronology
Sicario: Day of the Soldado (2018)	Chernobyl (2019)	Joker (2019)

Chernobyl: Music from the Original TV Series is the soundtrack album to the historical drama miniseries Chernobyl, based on the aftermath of Chernobyl disaster that occurred during 1986. The musical score was composed by Icelandic composer Hildur Guðnadóttir, which was created using sound recordings from an actual nuclear power plant. The score album features thirteen tracks, and was released under Deutsche Grammophon and WaterTower Music labels on May 31, 2019. A vinyl edition of the soundtrack was released by Decca Records on September 6, 2019.

The score opened to positive reception, with listeners appreciating the soundscape, composition and live recording methods. The authentic approach to capture the sounds from a nuclear plant were highlighted and praised by critics. It was named one of Guðnadóttir's best original score compositions, followed by Joker's soundtrack, which was released later that year. Guðnadóttir has received several awards and nominations for her work, including the Best Score Soundtrack for Visual Media at the 62nd Annual Grammy Awards.

== Development ==
In August 2018, during filming of the series, Guðnadóttir and score producer Chris Watson, went to the Ignalina Nuclear Power Plant in Lithuania (where the series was primarily shot) to record dark ambient sounds for the score. Whilst recording in the nuclear facility, the music team wore hazmat suits as a safety measure. According to Guðnadóttir, she wanted the power plant—and the radiation—to be a voice in itself, and had "wanted to understand the feeling of what must have gone through people’s heads as they were trying to navigate through that disaster", resulting in a sound of "creeping death".

Every single sound from the score was made from the recordings they captured on site. Instead of artificially creating the sounds using instruments and pre-recorded material, Guðnadóttir wanted to "observe the setting", hoping to experience from a listener's perspective what it's like to actually be inside of a power plant. She explained the same in a podcast interview, saying: "How does that sound? Like, [what] does a catastrophe really feel like and how does it sound [...] We associate certain sounds of a nuclear disaster and those emitters, but there are so many other sounds that are there that were just so interesting to observe." She recorded the sounds of reactor halls, hallways, turbine saws, the hums of machinery, walls and the engine room door, and started composition with the sounds she had collected. She also used reverb and her own recordings, to make it actually sound like "singing in the rooms of the nuclear power plant and not in her music studio". Deciding against writing theme music for the series, Guðnadóttir created an individual soundscape for each episode. The composition process took more than seven months.

== Reception ==
Billboard's Ellen Emmerentze Jervell said of the soundtrack: "A simultaneously disturbing and melancholic soundtrack focused on sound-building rather than classic orchestration". Praising it as a "smart and effective" soundtrack and "one of the best albums of 2019", Richie Corelli of Horror DNA wrote: "Hildur Guðnadóttir’s soundtrack is something that is sure to appeal to fans of horror music. The eeriness of the soundtrack, the anxiety-inducing push/pull between relaxing and restless, the bombastic builds, and the metallic timbres make this a tense, unnerving record." Filmmakers Academy analysed the score for the series, writing: "This soundtrack is nothing short of a triumph of innovation, intellect, and ingenuity and its impact will likely last longer than any half-life". In contrast, Jonathan Broxton was more critical of the series' music, calling it an "auditory nightmare".

== Track listing ==
All tracks and written and composed by Hildur Guðnadóttir, except where noted.

Chernobyl: Music from the Original TV Series
No.	Title	Length
1.	"The Door"	2:43
2.	"Bridge of Death"	4:44
3.	"Turbine Hall"	2:36
4.	"Vichnaya Pamyat" (performed by Homin Lviv Municipal Choir)	4:07
5.	"Pump Room"	3:43
6.	"Clean Up"	1:41
7.	"Dealing with Destruction"	1:54
8.	"Waiting for the Engineer"	1:31
9.	"Gallery"	2:23
10.	"12 Hours Before"	2:31
11.	"Corridors"	3:13
12.	"Liður (Chernobyl Version)"	2:48
13.	"Evacuation"	4:43

== Accolades ==
Award	Category	Nominee(s)	Result	Ref.
British Academy Television Craft Awards	Best Original Music	Hildur Guðnadóttir	Won	
Grammy Awards	Best Score Soundtrack for Visual Media	Hildur Guðnadóttir	Won	
Hollywood Music in Media Awards	Best Original Score – TV Show/Limited Series	Hildur Guðnadóttir	Nominated	
International Film Music Critics Association	Best Original Score for Television	Hildur Guðnadóttir	Won	
Primetime Creative Arts Emmy Awards	Outstanding Music Composition for a Limited Series, Movie, or Special (Original Dramatic Score)	Hildur Guðnadóttir (for "Please Remain Calm")	Won	
Royal Television Society Craft and Design Awards	Music – Original Score	Hildur Guðnadóttir	Won	
Society of Composers & Lyricists Awards	Outstanding Original Score for a Television or Streaming Production	Hildur Guðnadóttir	Won	
Televisual Bulldog Awards	Best Music	Chernobyl	Won	
World Soundtrack Awards	Television Composer of the Year	Hildur Guðnadóttir	Won	
