= Sicario: Day of the Soldado (soundtrack) =

2018 film soundtrack album

Sicario: Day of the Soldado (Original Motion Picture Soundtrack)

Film score by Hildur Guðnadóttir
- Released: June 29, 2018
- Studio: Studio 22, Budapest, Hungary; Studio Sýrland, Reykjavík, Iceland
- Genre: Film score
- Length: 39:57
- Label: Varèse Sarabande
- Producer: Hildur Guðnadóttir

Hildur Guðnadóttir chronology
Mary Magdalene (2018)	Sicario: Day of the Soldado (2018)	Chernobyl (2019)

Sicario: Day of the Soldado (Original Motion Picture Soundtrack) is the film score composed by Hildur Guðnadóttir to the 2018 film Sicario: Day of the Soldado. A sequel to Sicario (2015), the film is directed by Stefano Sollima and stars Benicio del Toro, Josh Brolin, Jeffrey Donovan and Raoul Trujillo, reprising their roles from the predecessor. The score was released through Varèse Sarabande on June 29, 2018. The film and its score is dedicated to Jóhann Jóhannsson, the predecessor's composer, who died four months prior to the film's release.

== Development ==
Hildur Guðnadóttir, who previously collaborated with Jóhann Jóhannsson on Sicario as a cello soloist, had composed the score for Day of the Soldado. She considered the film to be an exciting as it felt in some ways a continuation of what she had done for the predecessor, while exploring the sequel with a fresh mind. Guðnadóttir referenced Jóhannsson's cue "The Beast" from Sicario which had been temped in numerous sequences. Guðnadóttir recorded different materials using different techniques in a variety of spaces, owing to her expertise in sound design, it felt as an opportunity to find numerous ways of music writing. She concurred that there was a connection between the physical sound of the space and story within the sound, which led her to dwell deep into the knowledge of sound design, especially in the miniseries Chernobyl.

Guðnadóttir used the dorophone, which a cello with an electro-acoustic feedback, considering it as Jimi Hendrix cello which was the main sound in the beginning of the film. She dispensed with melodies in favor of sonorous one-note music, to provide a chilling atmosphere, based on the first film, where Jóhannsson's score was "based on this very simple, low-string glissando motif repeated again and again" which Guðnadóttir wanted to honor it by using the low strings as a bridge to connect both the films. The score becomes more percussive in the action sequence, where Matt (Brolin) leads a caravan of militarized vehicles into the Mexican desert on a mission, where the percussion resonated with the sound design and the type of guns that were being shot. To accompany the onscreen action, Guðnadóttir avoided the use of conventional percussive instruments, but contacted her childhood friends to explore with any objects that can be used as percussive sounds; she achieved it by using the old school metal film canisters, and pizza boxes along with other objects to provide strange and mysterious sounds.

For the melodic material, Guðnadóttir worked with her family members and close friends who were part of the wind ensemble. Guðnadóttir's aunt played oboe while her father played clarinet, her brother was a part of the recording team, along with her best friends, adding that she had more fun collaborating with the people she had trusted. To depict the relationship between Alejandro (del Toro) and the 12-year-old Isabela (Isabela Merced) she conducted an orchestra in Budapest. According to Guðnadóttir, the predecessor's music was stripped down and never had an underscoring instead utilizes statement cues, but the second film followed the narrative closely and explores the relationship between Alejandro and Isabela, for which she uses higher strings for the emotional quotient. For Miguel (Elijah Rodriguez), she re-purposed the harp, by playing it with a bow, to create an uncomfortable feeling.

== Release ==
The soundtrack was released by Varèse Sarabande on June 29, 2018, coinciding with the film's release.

== Reception ==
Luke Bunting of Set the Tape wrote "Guðnadóttir has succeed in producing a listenable and tense score, but one with none of the flair or originality that made the original so notable. Its tone is correct, but as a composition it tends to underachieve while masking behind lots of processing. Fans of the films and this sound palette may find something here, but others would be better served revisiting the late Johannsson's oft-emulated classic." A reviewer from Film Music Central wrote "Perhaps I've misinterpreted the score (it has been a while since I watched the first Sicario), but that's my impression of the score for Sicario: Day of the Soldado. Please don't misunderstand, I enjoy listening to it very much, and I feel that it is very much in line with the score for the original Sicario. If there are musical departures, I'm simply not noticing them."

Camille Blake of Sound of Life wrote "The music is likewise incredibly tense, violent, and agitating, mirroring and reflecting the brutality of the film's characters and premise." Peter Debruge of Variety called Guðnadóttir's "bass-driven score" as "ominous". Todd McCarthy of The Hollywood Reporter wrote "Deep and disturbing echoes of the original film's overwhelming score by the late Johannson are to be heard in the new music by one of his proteges and creative colleagues, Hildur Gudnadottir." Calling it a "relentlessly foreboding, throbbing score", A. O. Scott of The New York Times said that "[Guðnadóttir's] music creates the impression that “Day of the Soldado” is a dark, high-stakes thriller, much as the bulked-up military hardware and souped-up operational jargon make it look like a war movie and the border backdrop gives it a sheen of sour topicality." Chris Kilmek of NPR described it a "dread-suffused score".

Oliver Jones of The Observer wrote "Almost all of the action is accompanied by the throbbing cello of Icelandic composer Hildur Guðnadóttir. The soundtrack, like the movie, is unrelenting, filled with dread, and never builds towards anything resembling a satisfying conclusion." Witney Seibold of IGN Middle East called the music "intense", while Matt Goldberg of Collider described it a "brooding score". Chris Evangelista of /Film compared it infavorably to the first film's score, adding: "Jóhann Jóhannsson (who died earlier this year) composed an eerie, droning, dread-inducing score for the first Sicario. Jóhannsson used a lot of percussion in his score, creating what he called "subtle war music." Hildur Guðnadóttir's Day of the Soldado score, in comparison, is forgettable to the extreme. It's moody and low-key, and never stands out the way Jóhannsson's did. In the last few minutes of Day of the Soldado, one of Jóhannsson's themes from the first film is suddenly played, and it's like having cold water splashed on your face. You suddenly remember how fantastic his propulsive score was, and it makes you realize how utterly boring the score for this film has been the entire time."

== Track listing ==
No.	Title	Length
1.	"Attack"	3:32
2.	"The Bomber"	1:35
3.	"Gulf of Somalia"	2:15
4.	"Miguel Takes Money"	1:42
5.	"Start a War"	2:22
6.	"The Kidnap"	3:29
7.	"Moving Isabelle"	1:09
8.	"Santa Claus"	4:25
9.	"Convoy"	4:44
10.	"Alejandro Saves Isabelle"	2:30
11.	"The Rescue"	1:34
12.	"Journey to Border"	4:28
13.	"The Execution"	1:37
14.	"Survivors"	1:27
Total length:		36:49

== Personnel ==
Credits adapted from liner notes:

- Music composer and producer – Hildur Guðnadóttir
- Arrangements – Kjartan Holm, Þórarinn Guðnason
- Electronic sound processing – Gunnar Örn Tynes, Þórarinn Guðnason, Kjartan Holm
- Sound design – Gunnar Örn Tynes, Þórarinn Guðnason
- Engineer – Sam Slater
- Recording – Gabor Buczko, Gunnar Örn Tynes
- Mixing – Daniel Kresco
- Mastering – Patricia Sullivan
- Music editor – Lee Scott
- Executive producer – Robert Townson
- Music supervisor – Jonathan Watkins
- Lacquer cut – CB

Orchestra

- Orchestra – Budapest Art Orchestra
- Orchestrators – Roman Vinuesa, Viktor Orri Árnason
- Additional orchestration – Kjartan Holm, Þórarinn Guðnason
- Conductor – Viktor Orri Árnason
- Contractor – Guðni Franzson, Miklos Lukas

Instruments

- Brass and woodwind ensemble – Caput
- Cello – Kjartan Holm, Hildur Guðnadóttir
- Halldorophone, bowed instruments – Hildur Guðnadóttir
- Percussion – Samuli Kosminen, Ólafur Björn Ólafsson, Þórarinn Guðnason, Kjartan Holm
- Piano – Hildur Guðnadóttir, Þórarinn Guðnason
- Synthesizer – Þórarinn Guðnason
- Guitar, koto harp – Kjartan Holm
- Violin, viola – Viktor Orri Árnason

== Accolades ==
Award	Category	Recipients	Result	Ref.
World Soundtrack Awards	Discovery of the Year	Hildur Guðnadóttir	Nominated	
