= Without Sinking =

Studio album by Hildur Guðnadóttir
- Released: 30 March 2009
- Genre: Experimental
- Length: 47:58
- Label: Touch

Hildur Guðnadóttir chronology
| Mount A (2006) | Without Sinking (2009) | Leyfðu Ljósinu (2012) |

Without Sinking is the second solo studio album by Icelandic musician and composer Hildur Guðnadóttir. It was released in 2009 through Touch Music.

== Background ==
Without Sinking is Hildur Guðnadóttir's first solo studio album since Mount A (2006), which was released under the pseudonym Lost in Hildurness. It includes contributions from Skúli Sverrisson and Jóhann Jóhannsson, as well as Hildur's father Guðni Franzson. It was mixed by Valgeir Sigurðsson and Hildur herself.

== Critical reception ==
Professional ratings
Review scores
| Source | Rating |
|---|---|
| AllMusic | 3.5/5 stars |
| Cokemachineglow | 78% |
| PopMatters | 9/10 |
| Record Collector | 4/5 stars |
| Tiny Mix Tapes | 4/5 stars |

Philip Sherburne of Pitchfork stated, "As patient as they are graceful, Without Sinking's 10 quietly expressive tracks are studies in the properties of layers; their closely harmonized voices move as naturally as tall grass in the wind."

Without Sinking was named one of the six best albums at the 2009 Kraumur Awards.

Fact placed the album at number 32 on its list of "The 40 Best Albums of 2009".

== Track listing ==
All tracks are written by Hildur Guðnadóttir.

Without Sinking track listing
| No. | Title | Length |
|---|---|---|
| 1. | "Elevation" | 5:51 |
| 2. | "Overcast" | 3:14 |
| 3. | "Erupting Light" | 2:17 |
| 4. | "Circular" | 4:13 |
| 5. | "Ascent" | 4:36 |
| 6. | "Opaque" | 3:46 |
| 7. | "Aether" | 5:07 |
| 8. | "Whiten" | 4:49 |
| 9. | "Into Warmer Air" | 6:06 |
| 10. | "Unveiled" | 7:12 |
| Total length: | | 47:58 |

== Personnel ==
Credits adapted from liner notes.

- Hildur Guðnadóttir – cello, zither, electronics, vocals, recording, mixing
- Skúli Sverrisson – bass guitar (1–6, 8–10), electronics (1–6, 8–10)
- Jóhann Jóhannsson – organ (2, 3, 9), electronics (2, 3, 9)
- Guðni Franzson – clarinet (7, 10), bass clarinet (7, 10)
- Valgeir Sigurðsson – mixing
- Denis Blackham – mastering
- Jon Wozencroft – photography
