= Black Seeds (album) =

Studio album by The Main Ingredient
- Released: 1971
- Recorded: 1971
- Studio: RCA's Studio C, New York City, New York
- Genre: Soul
- Label: RCA
- Producer: Tony Silvester, Luther Simmons, Donald McPherson

The Main Ingredient chronology
Tasteful Soul (1970)	Black Seeds (1971)	Bitter Sweet (1972)

Professional ratings
Review scores
Source	Rating
AllMusic	3/5 stars

Black Seeds is the third studio album by The Main Ingredient. Released in 1971 this is the last album to feature original lead singer Donald McPherson who had suddenly taken ill with leukaemia, and died unexpectedly not long before the album's release. It was then dedicated to him.

== Track listing ==
Side one
No.	Title	Writer(s)	Length
1.	"Black Seeds Keep on Growing"	Donald McPherson	3:31
2.	"I'm Leaving This Time"	Joe Hill	3:16
3.	"Movin' On"	Tony Silvester, Luther Simmons, Donald McPherson	2:55
4.	"Baby Don't Change Your Mind"	Donald McPherson	3:23
5.	"Another Day Has Come"	Luther Simmons, Donald McPherson	3:25
6.	"You Ain't Got It No Way"	Joe Hill	3:37

Side two
No.	Title	Writer(s)	Length
7.	"I've Fallen for You"	Luther Simmons, Donald McPherson	3:35
8.	"Don't Wonder Why"	Leonard Caston Jr.	4:58
9.	"Just Say It Again"	Joe Hill	3:29
10.	"It's So Sweet (Loving You)"	William Salter, Richard Alderson	3:55
11.	"Why Can't We All Unite"	Donald McPherson	3:25

== Personnel ==
- Bert De Coteaux - arranger, conductor
- Grover Helsley, Jim Crotty - engineer

== Charts ==
Chart (1971)	Peak
Billboard Pop Albums	175
Billboard Top Soul Albums	35

Singles

Year	Single	Peak chart positions	
Year	Single	US	US R&B
1971	"Black Seeds Keep on Growing"	97	15
