= Mount A (album) =

Studio album by Lost In Hildurness
- Released: September 2006
- Genre: Experimental
- Length: 54:09
- Label: 12 Tónar

Lost In Hildurness chronology
Mount A (2006)	Without Sinking (2009)

Mount A is the debut album from Icelandic musician Hildur Guðnadóttir. The album was released in 2006 by 12 Tónar under Guðnadóttir's artist name Lost In Hildurness, and remastered and reissued in 2010 by Touch under her own name. The album features a dark, somewhat repetitive soundscape built upon cello, gamba, khuur, piano, zither, vibraphone and gamelan all of which are played by Hildur. Recording sessions took place both in New York City and in a house in Hólar specifically chosen for its good cello acoustics.

== Track listing ==
1. "Light" - 4:18
2. "Floods" - 3:29
3. "Casting" - 6:35
4. "Shadowed" - 2:22
5. "Self" - 6:37
6. "Growth" - 3:36
7. "In Gray" - 3:23
8. "My" - 2:37
9. "Reflection" - 7:31
10. "Earbraces" - 3:28
11. "You" - 10:07
