= Electric cello =

Electrical musical instrument

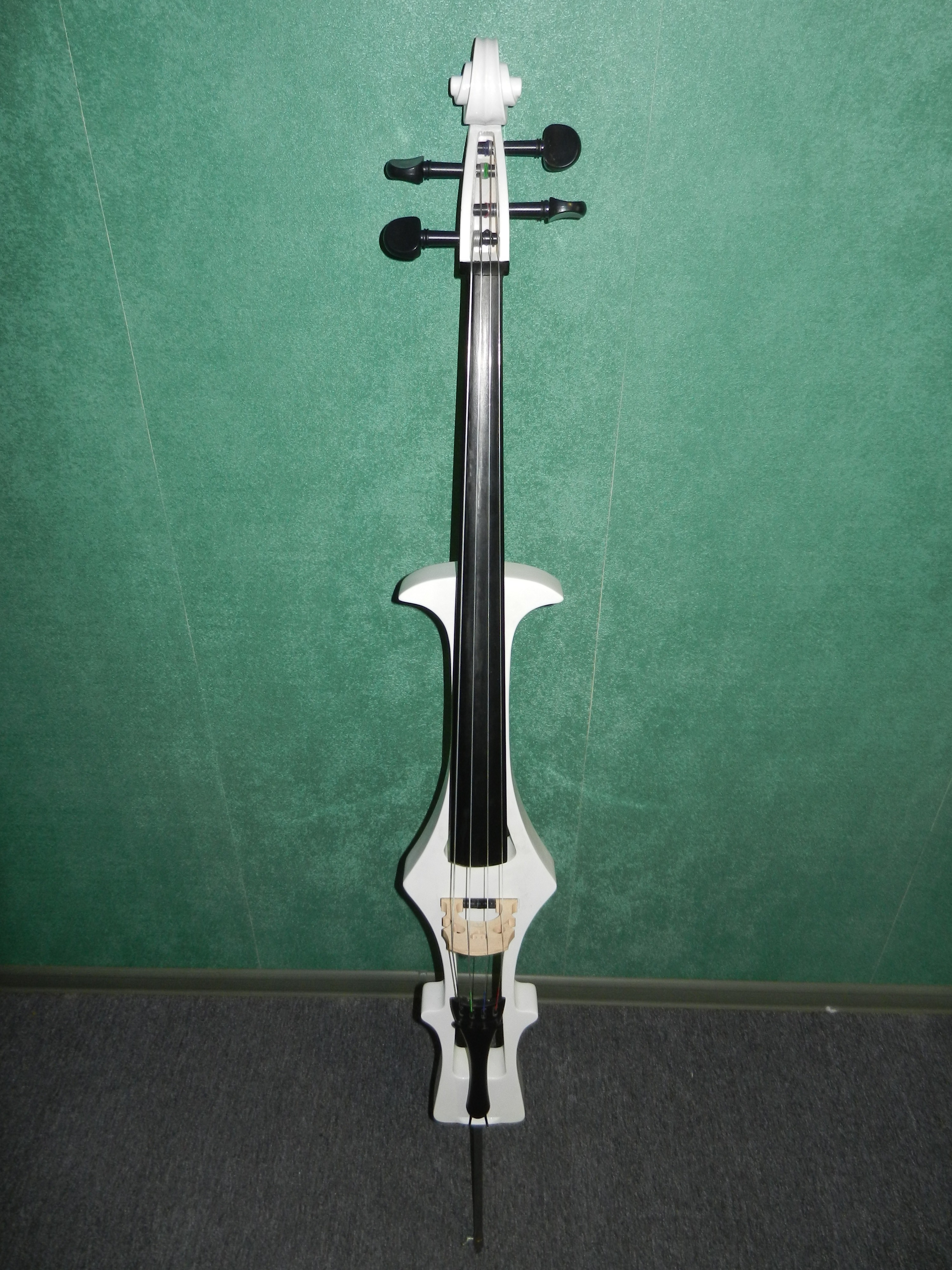
- Classification: Bowed string instrument

Related instruments
- Cello

The electric cello is a type of cello that relies on electronic amplification (rather than acoustic resonance) to produce sound. An acoustic cello can be fitted with a bridge or body mounted contact pickup providing an electric signal, or a built-in pickup can be installed. A few pickups work by other principles like magnetic coil guitar type needing steel strings to work, or by an unusual pickup system employing the string itself as a linear pickup element, thus avoiding any modification of tone-producing parts on an acoustic cello.

Many electric cellos have bodies modeled after acoustic cellos, while others abandon the design completely, opting for a totally new body shape, or having little or no body at all. Most electric cellos feature a traditional endpin and knee supports, but some are supported in other ways, such as by an elongated pin for playing in the standing position, a tripod stand, strap, or strap system that allows mobility while playing the instrument. The major differentiating factor between electric cellos and acoustic cellos is that while the latter rely on an acoustically resonant soundbox, the former are amplified electronically and often have no resonant chamber at all.

Most electric cellos are driven by a piezo pickup system mounted in the bridge. Many also contain an on-board preamp, which allows the musician localized control over the sound. The number of piezo elements in use range from one to eight. The electric cello has several advantages over acoustic cellos. One of these advantages is its capacity for sound effects, such as distortion, wah, and chorus, which allows for the creation of a huge variety of sounds and possibilities matching that of the electric guitar, electric bass and electric violin. Also, five-string and six-string models (not generally available in acoustic cellos) allow for an extended range. An electric cello with no body can be played in the high positions more easily than an acoustic. Lastly, electric cellos without a resonant body have less of a tendency for feedback than amplified acoustic cellos.

The electric cello has not yet achieved the status of the ubiquitous electric guitar, or even the widespread success of the electric violin.

== See also ==
- Cello rock
- Halldorophone
