= Ken Williams (songwriter) =

American songwriter (1939–2022)

Background information
- Born: Kenneth Williams; January 13, 1939; Fernandina Beach, Florida, U.S.
- Died: June 17, 2022 (aged 83) Manhasset, New York
- Occupations: Songwriter; Record producer Arranger; Singer; Vocalist; Engineer; Pianist; CEO
- Instruments: Piano
- Years active: 1959–2022
- Spouse: Mary Seymour Williams
- Website: adishatunes.com/about-1

Kenneth Williams (January 13, 1939 – June 17, 2022) was an American songwriter, record producer, arranger and singer, best known for the 1972 hit song "Everybody Plays the Fool” which he co-wrote with J. R. Bailey and Rudy Clark, and was recorded by American R&B group The Main Ingredient and also by Aaron Neville. It reached No. 3 on the Billboard Hot 100 in 1972. It peaked at No. 2 on the Billboard R&B chart and at No. 25 on the Adult Contemporary chart.

Williams was the CEO and founder of the publishing company A-Dish-A-Tunes Music LLC.

== Early life ==
Williams was born on January 13, 1939, in Fernandina Beach, Florida. He studied music at Peck High School in his hometown. After graduating, he joined the Air Force and, while stationed in Great Falls, Montana, he formed a group called The Chuck A Lucks. The group members were Joseph R. Dubois, Robert Lee Clark, Dwight John Osborne, Ronald Tucker and Kenneth Williams.

== Career ==
Williams left the Air Force in 1959 and moved to New York City to pursue a career in music but he found it rough in New York City and decided to return to Florida. There, he joined a band and played jazz in clubs. Things did not work out in Florida, so he went back to New York and soon thereafter he started writing for a local publishing company.

In 1961, Warner Bros released a debut single from the Chuck-A-Lucks with tracks "Pick Up And Deliver" and "Long John". A few months later, "Cotton Pickin' Love" and "I’m Hospitalized Over You" followed.

In 1968, Williams formed a family owned music publishing company called A Dish-A-Tunes LLC. Over six decades, Williams wrote over 500 songs including "Everybody Plays the Fool" which was also recorded by Aaron Neville; “Love, Love, Love” by Donny Hathaway; “I Can’t See Me Without You" by The Impalas; “Sweet Music, Soft Lights and You” recorded by Tom Jones, Millie Jackson and Isaac Hayes; “Only When You’re Lonely” by Holly Maxwell; "Seven Lonely Nights" by the Four Tops; "It’s True I Am Gonna Miss You So" by Carolyn Franklin; “Keep On Holding On” by Margaret Reynolds; "Keep On Loving" by Teddy Pendergrass; “Hoping You Will Come Back” by Sandra Phillips; and many more.

== Personal life and death ==
Williams was married to Mary Seymour Williams, the Broadway actress and singer. He had three sons, a daughter and a step-son.

Williams died at North Shore University Hospital in Manhasset, New York on June 17, 2022, at the age of 83.

== Awards ==
In 2004, Williams' publishing company, A Dish-A-Tunes received a Grammy Award for the song “You Don’t Know My Name”. The song was recorded by Alicia Keys and produced by Kanye West.
