= Just Don't Want to Be Lonely =

1973 song performed by Ronnie Dyson

Single by Ronnie Dyson

from the album One Man Band
- B-side: "Point of No Return"
- Released: August 1973
- Genre: Rhythm and blues, soul
- Length: 3:11
- Label: Columbia
- Songwriters: Bobby Eli, John Freeman, Vinnie Barrett
- Producers: Thom Bell, Stan Vincent, Billy Jackson

Ronnie Dyson singles chronology
"One Man Band (Plays All Alone)" (1973)	"Just Don't Want to Be Lonely" (1973)	"We Can Make It Last Forever" (1974)

"Just Don't Want to Be Lonely"

Single by The Main Ingredient

from the album Euphrates River
- B-side: "Goodbye My Love"
- Released: January 1974
- Genre: R&B
- Length: 3:31
- Label: RCA Victor
- Songwriters: Bobby Eli; John Freeman; Vinnie Barrett

The Main Ingredient singles chronology
"Girl Blue" (1973)	"Just Don't Want to Be Lonely" (1974)	"Happiness is Just Around the Bend" (1974)

"Just Don't Want to Be Lonely" is a song written by Bobby Eli, John Freeman and Vinnie Barrett, originally recorded in 1973 by Ronnie Dyson and popularized internationally by The Main Ingredient. Dyson's version reached No. 60 in the US Pop chart, No. 30 Adult Contemporary, and No. 29 in the US R&B chart. Its flipside was "Point of No Return", a song written by Thom Bell & Linda Creed.

== Charts ==
Chart (1973–1974)	Peak position
US Billboard Hot 100	60
US Billboard Easy Listening	30
US Billboard Soul Singles	29
US Cash Box Top 100	70

== The Main Ingredient cover ==
The Main Ingredient's version of the song was released in 1974 on RCA Victor and reached No.10 in the US, No.8 in US R&B and No.42 in US AC. It reached No.7 in Canada. The recording was arranged by Bert de Coteaux. It became a gold record.

=== Charts ===
==== Weekly charts ====
Chart (1974)	Peak position
Canadian RPM Top Singles	7
Ireland (IRMA)	20
UK (OCC)	27
US Billboard Hot 100	10
US Billboard Easy Listening	42
US Billboard Hot Soul Singles	8
US Cash Box Top 100	8

==== Year-end charts ====
Chart (1974)	Rank
Canada	111
US Billboard Hot 100	36
US Cash Box Top 100	55

== Other cover versions ==
- Freddie McGregor recorded the song in a reggae version and released it in 1987. The track had Robbie Lyn on keyboards, synthesizer and Oberheim DMX programming and Dean Frazer on saxophone. Errol Thompson engineered and it was produced by Donovan Germain. McGregor's version reached No.9 in the UK.
- In 1996, Filipino singer Regine Velasquez included it on her album Retro.
- Other artists who delivered versions include Marlena Shaw, Boz Scaggs, Horace Andy, The Blues Busters, Little John, Marcia Griffiths, Sanchez, Livingston Taylor and Blue Magic.
- In 2026, the American rock band Bleachers sampled the Blue Magic version of the song on “The Van” from their album Everyone for Ten Minutes.
