= Simtec & Wylie =

Simtec & Wylie were an American soul duo from Chicago active in the late 1960s and early 1970s. The group was composed of Walter "Simtec" Simmons and Wylie Dixon, and had a hard soul sound similar to that of Sam & Dave.

Simtec (b. Chicago, December 23, 1944) was raised in Orrville, Alabama but moved back to Chicago at age 14, where he played guitar in local outfit the Vermaharms. Simtec's brother, Ronald, played bass, and after a chance meeting with DJ Herb Kent, Kent asked them to record a single over a drum machine. They did this with the help of a couple, Maurice & Maura Jackson owners of Tri-Em Record Productions and was recorded for the label Maurci, named after their daughter. The resulting 45, "Tea Box" b/w "Tea Pot", was a local hit and convinced Simmons to put together his own band, the T-Boxes.

This outfit eventually became the backing band for Simtec as a vocalist along with new vocalist and King Records veteran Wylie. As Simtec Simmons & Wylie Dixon, they issued "Socking Soul Power" in 1969, then became Simtec & Wylie for the 1970 Shama Records singles "Do It Like Mama" and "Gimme Some of What You Got". The group signed with the Mercury-distributed label Mr. Chand and issued a full-length, Gettin' Over the Hump, in 1971, which proved to be their only album; however, the track "Gotta Get Over the Hump" became a hit single on the R&B charts, reaching #29 on the Billboard Soul Singles chart. They appeared on Soul Train on Christmas Day 1971.

The group released singles together through the mid-1970s but saw no further success, and Simtec released a few solo singles in 1975 and a self-titled album in 1977. Simtec also did some work as a producer and songwriter; after his career in music he worked in Chicago in real estate.
