= Cuba Gooding Sr. =

American singer (1944–2017)

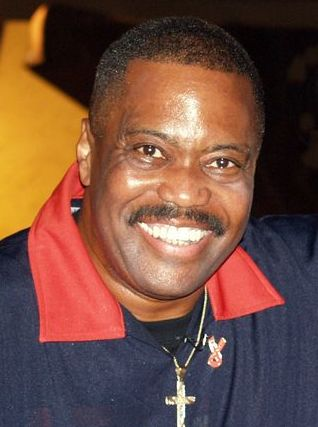
- Gooding in 2008
- Born: Cuba Mark Gooding; April 27, 1944; New York City, U.S.
- Died: April 20, 2017 (aged 72); Woodland Hills, California, U.S.
- Resting place: Trinity Church Cemetery
- Occupation: Singer
- Years active: 1964–2017
- Spouses: Shirley Sullivan (m. 1966; div. 1974) (m. 1995)
- Children: 4, including Cuba Jr. and Omar
- Relatives: Mason Gooding (grandson)

Cuba Mark Gooding Sr. (April 27, 1944 – April 20, 2017) was an American singer. He was the most successful lead singer of the soul group The Main Ingredient, replacing former lead singer Donald McPherson who was diagnosed with leukemia in 1971. According to Billboard, as the lead vocalist he scored five top 10 hits, most notably, "Everybody Plays the Fool" (1972), peaking at No. 2 for three weeks, and peaking at No. 3 on Billboard′s all-genre Hot-100 list. "Just Don't Want to Be Lonely" (1974), "Happiness Is Just Around the Bend" and "Rolling Down a Mountainside" were also top 10 hits on Billboard charts. He also recorded as a solo artist with hits of his own.

== Early life ==
Born in Harlem, New York City, Gooding was a son of Dudley MacDonald Gooding (1889–1955) and his wife Addie Alston. The elder Gooding was a native of Barbados who fled the island in 1936 to Cuba, and met and married a woman there. When she was murdered because of their affiliation with Pan Africanist leader Marcus Garvey, Dudley Gooding promised his wife on her deathbed that he would name his first son Cuba. Dudley Gooding was a taxi driver in Manhattan who died when Cuba was 11 years old.

== Career ==
Gooding Sr. was lead singer of The Charades in the 1960s. He joined The Main Ingredient as a back-up vocalist. He became the lead singer after lead singer Donald McPherson died of leukemia in 1971. The 1973 album Afrodisiac featured several songs co-written by Stevie Wonder. Gooding left The Main Ingredient in either 1977 or 1978.^{1} He had a brief solo career on Motown Records during the late 1970s and early 1980s making two albums; the first was titled The 1st Cuba Gooding Album, while the second was titled Love Dancer. His biggest international success was Brian Auger's "Happiness Is Just Around the Bend" in 1983, which has in recent times been sampled by several R&B artists, as well as hitting the charts again as a remix by UK Hardcore Rave group Altern-8 in 1991. In 1980, Gooding returned to The Main Ingredient and made two more albums for RCA Victor. In 1991, samples from the song also featured prominently in Bizarre Inc's single "Playing With Knives". Gooding released a single called "Politics" in September 2007. He was also developing a film project called Everybody Plays the Fool: The Cuba Gooding Story. The film highlights three generations of the Gooding Family: Dudley "Cuba" Gooding, Cuba Gooding Sr., Cuba Gooding Jr. and Omar Gooding.

On the Boat Trip DVD trivia track, it was stated that he was going to appear in the 2003 romantic-comedy The Fighting Temptations, which stars his son Cuba Gooding Jr., but he is not in the movie.

Gooding appeared on the Beach Music Super Collaboration CD, performing the Charles Wallert composition, "Meant To Be In Love". This led to the duo's project, “Never Give Up” (Bluewater Recordings), which debuted at the 2009 presidential inauguration.

== Personal life and death ==
Gooding moved from the Bronx to southern California in the 1970s. Gooding and his wife, singer Shirley Gooding (née Sullivan) had three children: actors Cuba Gooding Jr., Omar Gooding, and actress April Gooding. He was also father to musician Tommy Gooding from a previous relationship. Gooding Sr. later became a minor actor himself. Gooding Sr. separated from his wife in 1974. In 1995, the Goodings remarried.

In 2011, he had a residence in Rosarito Beach, Mexico where he performed at least one charity concert. He also had a residence in Flagler Beach, Florida.

On April 20, 2017, one week before his 73rd birthday, Gooding was found dead in his vehicle while parked on a street in Woodland Hills, Los Angeles. CPR was performed by the fire department but they were unable to revive him. Investigators reported that drug paraphernalia and several bottles of alcohol were found in the vehicle. The official cause of death was later ruled to be accidental, caused by acute intoxication from cocaine and alcohol, with underlying heart disease (hypertensive and atherosclerotic cardiovascular disease) listed as a contributing factor.

He is interred at the Trinity Church Cemetery in Manhattan.
