= Hildur Guðnadóttir =

Icelandic musician and composer (born 1982)

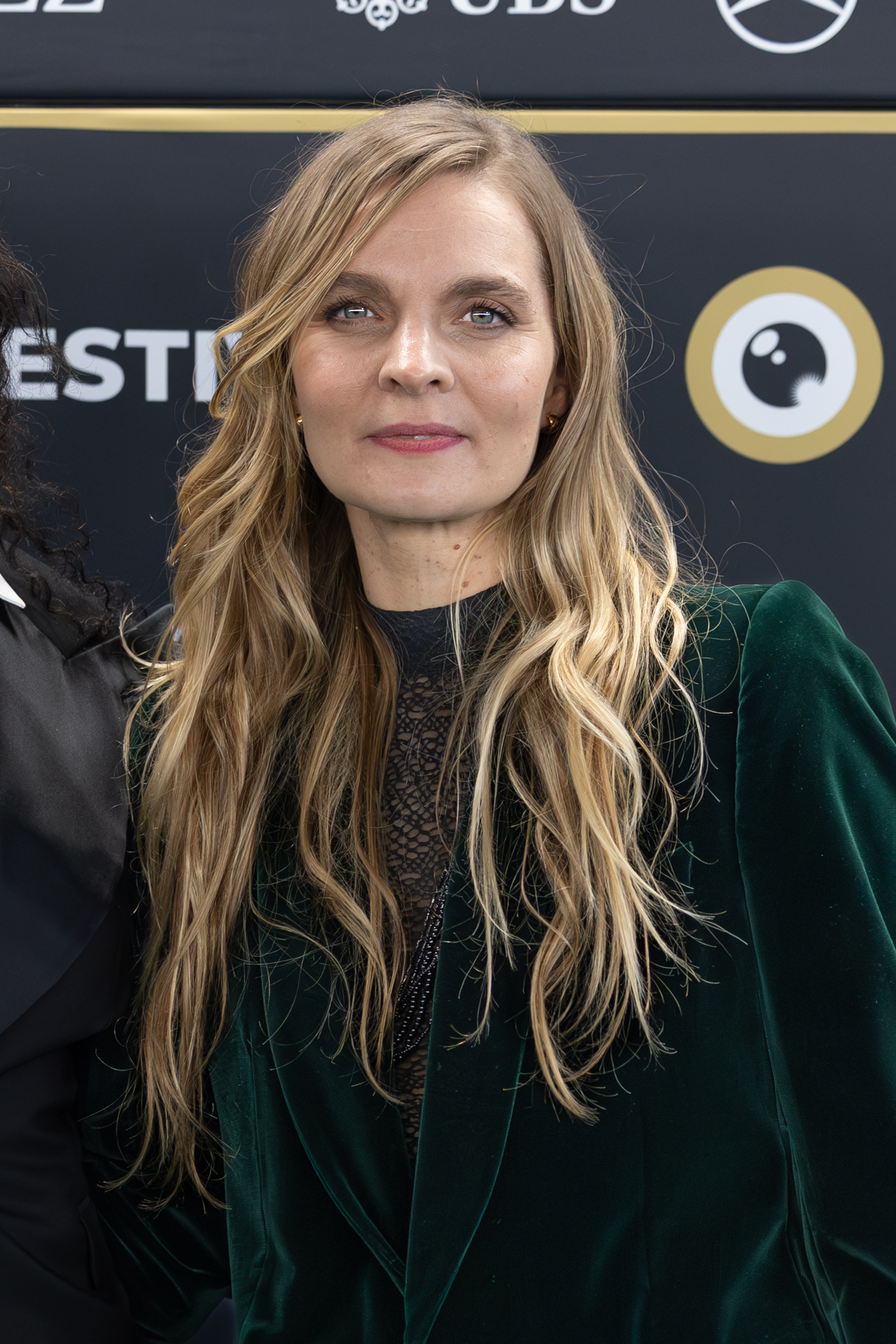
- Hildur Gudnadottir on the Green Carpet at the 2025 Zurich Film Festival

Background information
- Born: Hildur Ingveldardóttir Guðnadóttir; 4 September 1982 (age 44); Reykjavík, Iceland
- Genres: Film score; soundtrack; experimental; drone; ambient
- Occupations: Composer; musician
- Instruments: Vocals; cello; halldorophone; keyboards; percussion
- Years active: 2001–present
- Label: Touch Music/Deutsche Grammophon/Universal Classics
- Website: hildurness.com

Hildur Ingveldardóttir Guðnadóttir (Note: Icelandic pronunciation: [ˈhɪltʏr ˈkvʏðnaˌtouʰtɪr̥]) (born 4 September 1982) is an Icelandic musician and composer. A classically trained cellist, she has played and recorded with the bands Pan Sonic, Throbbing Gristle, Múm, and Stórsveit Nix Noltes, and has toured with Animal Collective and Sunn O))). She has received various accolades, including an Academy Award, two Grammy Awards, and a Primetime Emmy Award.

Hildur has gained international recognition for her film and television scores, including Journey's End (2017), Mary Magdalene (2018), Sicario: Day of the Soldado (2018), Todd Field’s Tár and Sarah Polley’s Women Talking (both 2022). Her score for Todd Phillips’ Joker (2019), won the Academy Award for Best Original Score, the BAFTA Award for Best Original Music, and the Golden Globe Award for Best Original Score, making Hildur the first solo female composer to win in all three. She is also known for her work on the HBO miniseries Chernobyl (2019), which won her a Primetime Emmy Award, a BAFTA TV Award and a Grammy Award.

== Early life ==
Hildur was born in 1982 in Reykjavík, Iceland, and was raised in Hafnarfjörður. She comes from a family of musicians — her father, Guðni Franzson, is a composer, clarinet player and teacher. Her mother, Ingveldur Guðrún Ólafsdóttir, is an opera singer, and her brother is Þórarinn Guðnason from the band Agent Fresco. Hildur began playing cello at the age of five and performed her first professional gig at 10 alongside her mother at a restaurant. She attended the Reykjavik Music Academy and went on to study composition and new media at the Iceland Academy of the Arts and the Berlin University of the Arts.

== Career ==
Hildur playing with Evil Madness at Iðno, Reykjavík

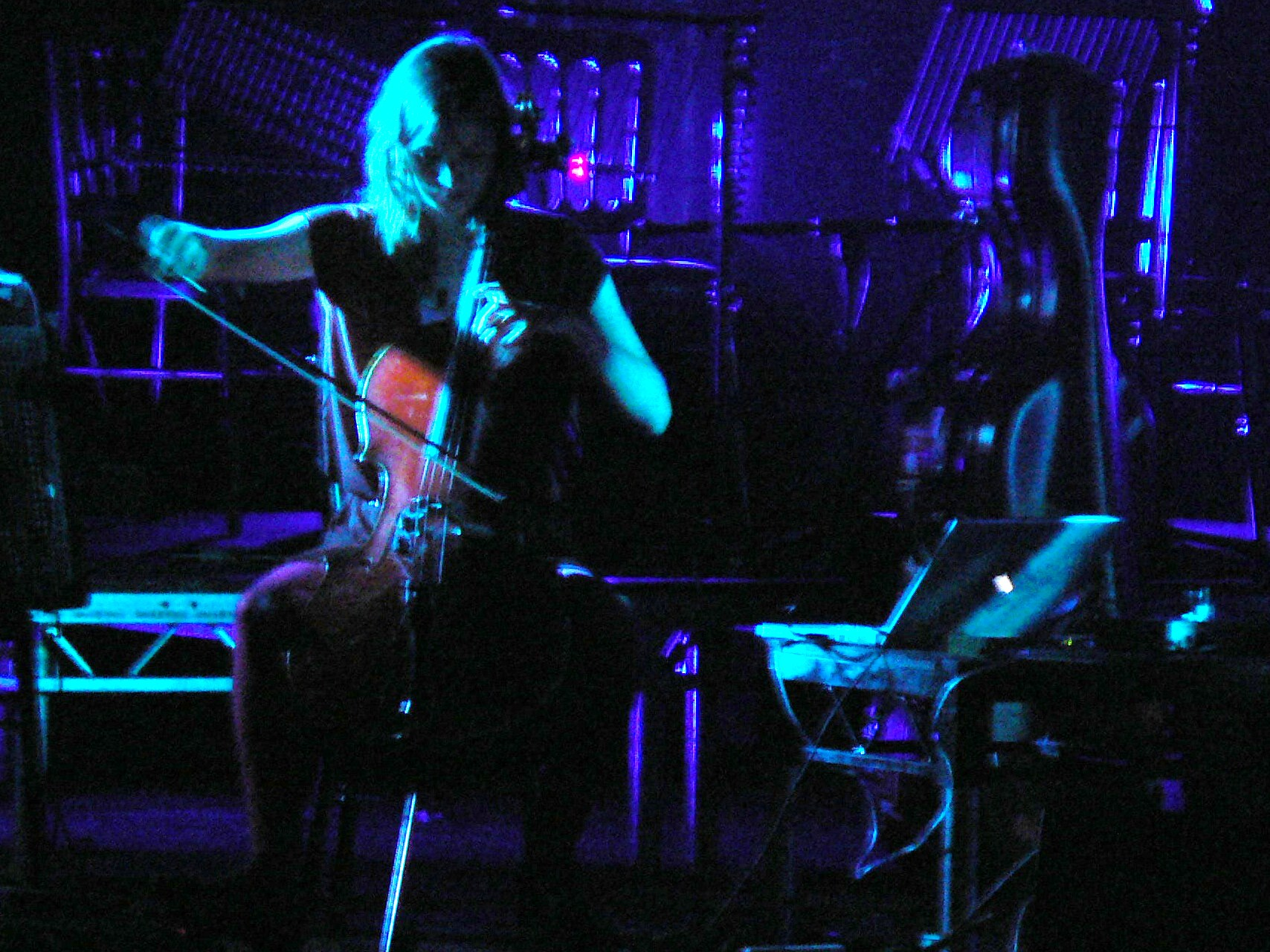
Hildur in 2009

In 2006, Hildur released a solo album, Mount A, under the name Lost In Hildurness, on which she attempted to "involve other people as little as [she] could." It was recorded in New York City and Hólar in the north of Iceland. 2009 saw the release of her second solo album, Without Sinking, on the U.K.-based audio-visual label, Touch.

As well as playing cello and halldorophone, Hildur also sings and arranges choral music, once arranging a choir for performances by Throbbing Gristle in Austria and London. As a composer she has written a score for the play Sumardagur ("Summer Day") performed at Iceland's National Theatre. She has also written the score for the Danish film Kapringen (2012), The 2018 Garth Davis film Mary Magdalene (in collaboration with Jóhann Jóhannsson), Stefano Sollima’s Sicario: Day of the Soldado (2018). Her work on the 2019 Chernobyl miniseries was met with critical acclaim, and won her a Primetime Emmy Award for Outstanding Music Composition for a Limited Series, Movie, or Special (Original Dramatic Score) and the first Grammy Award for Best Score Soundtrack for Visual Media.

She composed the score to the 2019 film Joker, starring Joaquin Phoenix and Robert De Niro, and directed by Todd Phillips, for which she won the Premio Soundtrack Stars Award at the 76th Venice International Film Festival and the Golden Globe Award for Best Original Score, becoming the first solo woman composer to win in this category. At the 92nd Academy Awards, Hildur won the award for Best Original Score, becoming the first woman to win since the Original Dramatic Score and Original Musical or Comedy Score categories were combined in 2000. She is the first Icelander to win an Oscar. She returned as composer for the 2024 sequel Joker: Folie à Deux.

In 2021, Hildur collaborated with her husband, Sam Slater, on the video-game score for Battlefield 2042 by DICE (company) and EA Games. The soundtrack was released 10 September 2021.

== Personal life ==
Hildur lives in Berlin with her son (born 2012). She is married to Sam Slater, an English composer, music producer and sound artist, with whom she collaborated on multiple projects including Chernobyl and Joker. She also used to share a studio with fellow composers Dustin O'Halloran and the late Jóhann Jóhannsson, the latter being a frequent collaborator, while residing in Berlin.

== Discography ==
=== Solo ===
- Mount A (as Lost in Hildurness) (12 Tónar 2006)
  - re-released by Touch Music in 2010, as Hildur Guðnadóttir
  - re-released by Deutsche Grammophon in 2026, as Hildur Guðnadóttir
- Without Sinking (Touch, 2009), with a vinyl version with extra tracks in 2011
  - re-released by Deutsche Grammophon in 2026
- Leyfðu Ljósinu (Touch, 2012), with a multi-channel version on USB
- Saman (Touch, 2014), with a vinyl version
  - re-released by Deutsche Grammophon in 2026
- Fólk fær andlit (Single, Deutsche Grammaphon, 2020)
- Where to From (Deutsche Grammophon, 2025)
- Origins (Deutsche Grammophon, 2026), compilation
- This Will Be Us (Deutsche Grammophon, 2026)

=== Collaboration ===
- Rúnk – Ghengi Dahls (Flottur kúltúr og gott músik, 2001)
- Mr. Schmucks Farm – Good Sound (Oral, 2005)
- Stórsveit Nix Noltes – Orkídeur Hawai (12 Tónar/Bubblecore, 2005)
- Angel and Hildur Guðnadóttir – In Transmediale (Oral, 2006)
- Hildur Guðnadóttir with Jóhann Jóhannsson – Tu Non Mi Perderai Mai (Touch, 2006)
- Nico Muhly – Speaks volumes (Bedroom Community 2006)
- Valgeir Sigurðsson – Equilibrium Is Restored (Bedroom Community, 2007)
- Ben Frost – Theory of Machines (Bedroom Community, 2006)
- Skúli Sverrisson – Sería (12 Tónar, 2006)
- Pan Sonic – Katodivaihe/Cathodephase (Blast First Petite, 2007)
- Múm – Go Go Smear the Poison Ivy (Fat Cat, 2007)
- Hildur Guðnadóttir, BJ Nilsen and Stilluppsteypa – Second Childhood (Quecksilber, 2007)
- Múm – Sing Along to Songs You Don't Know (Morr Music, 2009)
- The Knife – Tomorrow, In a Year (2010)
- Wildbirds & Peacedrums – Rivers (The Leaf Label, 2010)
- Sōtaisei Riron + Keiichirō Shibuya – Blue (Strings Edit) feat. Hildur Guðnadóttir (Commmons, 2010)
- Skúli Sverrisson – Sería II (Sería Music, 2010)
- Hauschka – Pan Tone (Sonic Pieces, 2011)
- Múm – Smilewound (Morr Music, 2013)
- Craig Sutherland – Strong Island, (2017)
- Sunn O))) – Life Metal, (2019)
- Sunn O))) – Pyroclasts, (2019)
- Sam Slater – Battlefield 2042, (2021)

=== Film work ===
| Year | Title | Director | Notes |
|---|---|---|---|
| 2011 | The Bleeding House | Philip Gelatt | Composer |
| 2012 | A Hijacking | Tobias Lindholm | Composer |
| 2012 | Astro: An Urban Fable in a Magical Rio de Janeiro | Paula Trabulsi | Composer |
| 2013 | Jîn | Reha Erdem | Composer |
| 2013 | Prisoners | Denis Villeneuve | Solo cello |
| 2015 | Sicario | Denis Villeneuve | Solo cello |
| 2015 | The Revenant | Alejandro G. Iñárritu | Solo cello |
| 2016 | The Oath | Baltasar Kormákur | Composer |
| 2016 | Arrival | Denis Villeneuve | Solo cello and halldorophone |
| 2017 | Tom of Finland | Dome Karukoski | Composer, with Lasse Enersen |
| 2017 | Journey's End | Saul Dibb | Composer, with Natalie Holt |
| 2018 | Mary Magdalene | Garth Davis | Composer, with Jóhann Jóhannsson |
| 2018 | Sicario: Day of the Soldado | Stefano Sollima | Composer |
| 2019 | Joker | Todd Phillips | Composer |
| 2021 | Candyman | Nia DaCosta | Cello and vocals, 1st collaboration with DaCosta |
| 2022 | Tár | Todd Field | Composer |
| 2022 | Women Talking | Sarah Polley | Composer |
| 2023 | A Haunting in Venice | Kenneth Branagh | Composer, replaced Patrick Doyle |
| 2024 | Joker: Folie à Deux | Todd Phillips | Composer |
| 2025 | Hedda | Nia DaCosta | Composer |
| 2026 | 28 Years Later: The Bone Temple | Nia DaCosta | Composer |
| 2026 | The Bride! | Maggie Gyllenhaal | Composer, replaced Jonny Greenwood |
| TBA | Enemies † | Henry Dunham | Composer |
| TBA | The Bell Jar † | Sarah Polley | Composer |

=== Television ===
| Year | Title | Studio | Notes |
|---|---|---|---|
| 2013 | Graduates – Freedom Is Not For Free | Documentary film | Composer |
| 2014 | Så meget godt i vente | Danish Documentary Production | Composer |
| 2014 | Ming Of Harlem: Twenty One Storeys In The Air | Big Other Films; Wellcome Trust; Picture Palace Pictures; Michigan Films | Composer |
| 2015–2018 | Trapped | RÚV | Composer, with Jóhannsson & Hoedemaekers |
| 2017 | Strong Island | Netflix | Composer |
| 2017 | The Departure | Pandora | Composer, additional music |
| 2018 | Street Spirits | V71 | Composer, with Eric Papky |
| 2019 | Chernobyl | HBO | Composer |

== Awards and nominations ==
| Associations | Year | Category | Work | Result | Ref. |
|---|---|---|---|---|---|
| Academy Awards | 2020 | Best Original Score | Joker | Won | |
| Asia Pacific Screen Awards | 2018 | Best Original Score | Mary Magdalene | Won | |
| AACTA Awards | 2018 | Best Original Music Score | Mary Magdalene | Nominated | |
| Beijing International Film Festival | 2018 | Best Music | Journey's End | Won | |
| British Academy Film Awards | 2020 | Best Original Music | Joker | Won | |
| British Academy Television Awards | 2020 | Best Original Music | Chernobyl | Won | |
| Critics' Choice Movie Awards | 2020 | Best Score | Joker | Won | |
| Critics' Choice Movie Awards | 2023 | Best Score | Tár | Won | |
| Critics' Choice Movie Awards | 2023 | Best Score | Women Talking | Nominated | |
| Golden Globe Awards | 2020 | Best Original Score – Motion Picture | Joker | Won | |
| Golden Globe Awards | 2023 | Best Original Score – Motion Picture | Women Talking | Nominated | |
| Grammy Awards | 2020 | Best Score Soundtrack for Visual Media | Chernobyl | Won | |
| Grammy Awards | 2021 | Best Score Soundtrack for Visual Media | Joker | Won | |
| Grammy Awards | 2021 | Best Arrangement, Instrumental or A Cappella | "Bathroom Dance" | Nominated | |
| Hollywood Critics Association Awards | 2020 | Best Score | Joker | Won | |
| Hollywood Music in Media Awards | 2019 | Best Original Score in a Feature Film | Joker | Won (Note: tied with Marco Beltrami and Buck Sanders for Ford v Ferrari) | |
| Hollywood Music in Media Awards | 2022 | Best Original Score in a Feature Film | Women Talking | Nominated | |
| Hollywood Music in Media Awards | 2023 | Best Original Score in a Horror Film | A Haunting in Venice | Won | |
| Houston Film Critics Society Awards | 2020 | Best Original Score | Joker | Nominated | |
| Nordic Music Prize | 2020 | Best Nordic Album Of The Year | Chernobyl | Won | |
| Primetime Emmy Awards | 2019 | Outstanding Music Composition for a Limited Series, Movie, or Special | Chernobyl (for episode "Please Remain Calm") | Won | |
| Robert Awards | 2013 | Best Score | A Hijacking | Nominated | |
| Satellite Awards | 2020 | Best Original Score | Joker | Won | |
| Satellite Awards | 2023 | Best Original Score | Women Talking | Nominated | |
| Venice International Film Festival | 2019 | Soundtrack Stars Award | Joker | Won | |
| Venice International Film Festival | 2024 | Soundtrack Stars Award | Joker: Folie à Deux | Won | |
| World Soundtrack Awards | 2019 | Television Composer of the Year | Chernobyl; Trapped | Won | |
| World Soundtrack Awards | 2020 | Film Composer of the Year | Joker | Won | |
