= Everybody Plays the Fool =

1972 single by the Main Ingredient

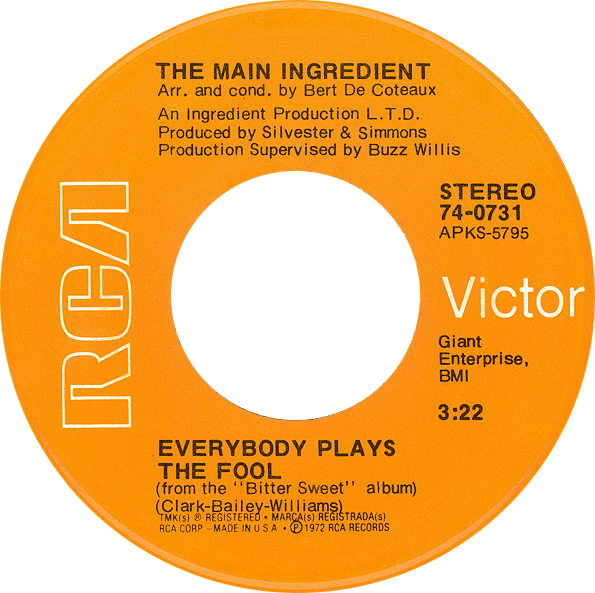
- Side A of US single

Single by the Main Ingredient

from the album Bitter Sweet
- B-side: "Who Can I Turn To (When Nobody Needs Me?)"
- Released: June 1972
- Recorded: 1972
- Studio: RCA Studio C (New York City)
- Genre: Soul; R&B
- Length: 3:22
- Label: RCA
- Songwriters: J. R. Bailey; Rudy Clark; Ken Williams
- Producers: Luther Simmons; Tony Silvester

The Main Ingredient singles chronology
"Black Seeds Keep on Growing" (1971)	"Everybody Plays the Fool" (1972)	"You've Got to Take It (If You Want It)" (1972)

"Everybody Plays the Fool" is a 1972 song first recorded by American R&B group the Main Ingredient, and written by J. R. Bailey, Rudy Clark and Ken Williams. It was the first single released from the group's album Bitter Sweet, released with the B-side "Who Can I Turn To (When Nobody Needs Me?)". "Everybody Plays the Fool" was the group's highest charting hit single, reaching No. 3 on the Billboard Hot 100 chart in the fall of 1972. It also peaked at No. 2 on the Billboard R&B chart and at No. 25 on the Billboard adult contemporary chart. It was certified gold by the RIAA.

The song was nominated for the Grammy Award for Best R&B Song at the 1973 ceremony, losing to "Papa Was a Rollin' Stone".

A 1991 cover of the song by Aaron Neville, from the album Warm Your Heart, was also successful, reaching #8 on the Billboard Hot 100 chart and #1 in New Zealand.

== Charts ==
=== Weekly charts ===
Chart (1972)	Peak position
Australia (Kent Music Report)	44
Canada Top Singles (RPM)	6
US Billboard Hot 100	3
US Easy Listening (Billboard)	25
US Best Selling Soul Singles (Billboard)	2
US Cash Box Top 100	1

=== Year-end charts ===
Chart (1972)	Rank
Australia	136
Canada	66
US Billboard Hot 100	29
US Cash Box Top 100	29

== Aaron Neville version ==
"Everybody Plays the Fool"

Single by Aaron Neville

from the album Warm Your Heart
- B-side: "House on a Hill"
- Released: August 15, 1991
- Length: 4:25
- Label: A&M
- Songwriters: J.R. Bailey; Rudy Clark; Ken Williams
- Producers: Russell Kunkel; George Massenburg; Linda Ronstadt

Aaron Neville singles chronology
"When Something Is Wrong with My Baby" (1990)	"Everybody Plays the Fool" (1991)	"Somewhere Somebody" (1991)

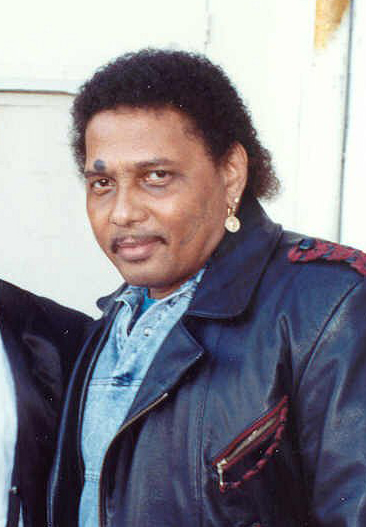
Aaron Neville, 1990

American singer Aaron Neville recorded a cover version of "Everybody Plays the Fool" in 1991 which also hit the Top 10 on the Billboard Hot 100 chart, reaching No. 8 in the fall of that year, and it spent 20 weeks on the chart. This was Neville's third Top 10 hit on the pop chart, following "Tell It Like It Is" (1967, No. 2) and his duet with Linda Ronstadt, "Don't Know Much" (1989, No. 2). Neville's single also went to No. 1 on the Billboard adult contemporary chart. In addition, it was a No. 1 single in New Zealand.

=== Critical reception ===
The song received a positive review from AllMusic. Alex Henderson felt that "Everybody Plays the Fool" showed that Neville still had plenty of warmth and charisma. Pan-European magazine Music & Media stated that "the New Orleans soul brother has found the right catchy tune on a reggae beat to establish his enormous vocal acrobatics on EHR level again."

David Fricke from Rolling Stone described the song as a "rinky-dink reggae cover". Juke said, "One of the great, sweet voices in rock and soul history steps put from the fraternal fold for a rare solo performance and blows it with a substandard slice of sickly sweet balladry.

=== Music video ===
Neville's music video was set in New Orleans, and featured an appearance of his niece, Arthel Neville.

=== Charts ===
==== Weekly charts ====
Chart (1991)	Peak position
Australia (ARIA)	52
Canada Top Singles (RPM)	19
Canada Adult Contemporary (RPM)	3
New Zealand (Recorded Music NZ)	1
US Billboard Hot 100	8
US Adult Contemporary (Billboard)	1
US Hot R&B Singles (Billboard)	2
US Cash Box Top 100	11

==== Year-end charts ====
Chart (1991)	Rank
Canada Adult Contemporary (RPM)	28
New Zealand (RIANZ)	14
US Billboard Hot 100	87

==== Certifications ====
Region	Certification	Certified units/sales
New Zealand (RMNZ)	Gold	15,000^{‡}
^{‡} Sales+streaming figures based on certification alone.
