= The Main Ingredient =

American soul and R&B group

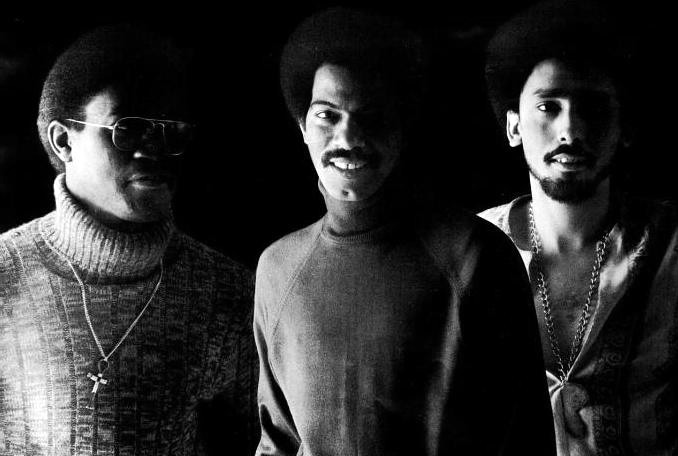
- The Main Ingredient in 1970. Original members (L-to-R) Luther Simmons, Don McPherson, and Tony Silvester

Background information
- Origin: Harlem, New York, U.S.
- Genres: Soul, R&B, funk
- Years active: 1964–1977, 1979–1981, 1986–1991, 1999–2020
- Labels: Red Bird Records (1964); RCA Records (1970–1981); Polydor Records (1989); Magnatar (2001); Kent Soul (Compilation)
- Past members: Donald McPherson; Luther Simmons; Tony "Panama" Silvester; Cuba Gooding Sr. Carl Tompkins; Jerome Jackson; Stanley Alston; Larry Moore; Carlton Blount; George Staley Sr. Ryan Idell

The Main Ingredient was an American soul and R&B group which had a run of hits in the 1970s, including their 1972 million-selling song "Everybody Plays the Fool".

== Early history ==
The group was formed in Harlem, New York City in 1964 as a trio called the Poets, composed of lead singer Donald McPherson (July 9, 1941 – July 3, 1971), Luther Simmons Jr. (September 9, 1942 – May 9, 2016), and Panama-born Tony Silvester (October 7, 1941 – November 26, 2006). They made their first recordings for Leiber & Stoller's Red Bird label, but soon changed their name to the Insiders and signed with RCA Records. In 1968, after a couple of singles, they changed their name once again, this time permanently, to The Main Ingredient. The name came from a Coca-Cola bottle.

They then teamed up with record producer/arranger Bert DeCoteaux. Under his direction, The Main Ingredient reached the R&B Top 30 for the first time in 1970 with "You've Been My Inspiration". A cover of The Impressions' "I'm So Proud" broke the Top 20, and "Spinning Around (I Must Be Falling in Love)" went into the Top 10.

In 1971, they scored again, with the McPherson-penned black-power anthem "Black Seeds Keep on Growing," but tragedy struck that year. Don McPherson, who had been suddenly taken ill with leukemia, died unexpectedly on July 3, 1971, at age 29. Stunned, Tony Silvester and Luther Simmons re-grouped with new lead singer Cuba Gooding Sr., who had served as a backing vocalist on some of their previous recordings, and had filled in on tour during McPherson's brief illness.

The Gooding era began auspiciously with the million-selling smash "Everybody Plays the Fool", which hit number two R&B and number three pop to become the group's biggest hit. It sold over one million copies and was awarded a gold disc by the R.I.A.A. in September 1972. The accompanying album, Bitter Sweet, became their first to hit the Top 10 on the R&B albums chart; its follow-up, 1973's Afrodisiac, featured several songs written or co-written by Stevie Wonder, although it did not produce any huge successes on the singles charts. They peaked at number eight on the R&B chart in 1974 with "Just Don't Want to Be Lonely", which sold over a million copies, and also reached number ten on the Billboard Hot 100. The track peaked at number twenty-seven in the UK Singles Chart in July 1974, although it was their only chart presence in the UK.

In 1975, the group recorded several songs co-written by Leon Ware, including the R&B Top Ten "Rolling Down a Mountainside". By this point, however, Tony Silvester was harboring other ambitions; he released a solo album called Magic Touch that year, and left the group to form a production team with DeCoteaux. The two of them scored a Top 10 Pop and R&B smash with their production of Ben E. King's hit "Supernatural Thing" in 1975.

In 1975 they were the opening act for The Jackson 5 at the Theatre at Westbury (known as The Westbury Music Fair at that time) on Long Island, New York, for the six shows from August 26 until 31. The Doobie Brothers were originally scheduled to perform, it's unknown why this change was made.

== Later years ==
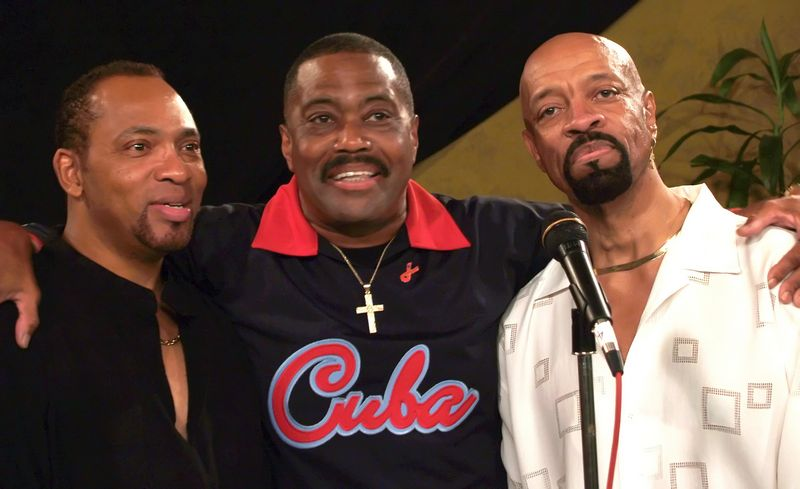
The Main Ingredient in 2008. The group at that time consisted of Cuba Gooding Sr., Jerome Jackson and Stanley Alston.

Silvester was replaced by Carl Tompkins, and Gooding departed for a solo career on Motown in 1977, which produced two albums; Simmons, meanwhile, left the music industry to work as a stockbroker. Gooding, Silvester and Simmons reunited as the Main Ingredient in 1979, and recorded two more albums, 1980's Ready for Love and 1981's I Only Have Eyes for You (the latter featured a minor hit in "Evening of Love"). The trio reunited for a second time in 1986, but their Zakia single "Do Me Right" flopped, and Simmons returned to his day job. He was replaced by Jerome Jackson on the 1989 Polydor album I Just Wanna Love You. In the wake of Aaron Neville's Top Ten revival of "Everybody Plays the Fool", Gooding resumed his solo career and issued his third album in 1993. Silvester and Simmons re-formed the Main Ingredient in 1999 with new lead singer Carlton Blount; this line-up recorded Pure Magic in 2001.

Tony Silvester died after a six-year struggle with multiple myeloma on November 26, 2006, at the age of 65, and original member Luther Simmons retired shortly thereafter. Simmons died on May 9, 2016, at the age of 74. Cuba Gooding Sr. was found dead in his car on April 20, 2017.

The final line-up of the group consisted of Jerome Jackson and Stanley Alston. On August 13, 2020, Alston died from ALS in his hometown of Palm Coast, Florida, at the age of 66.

== Discography ==
=== Studio albums ===
Year	Album	Peak chart positions			Record label
Year	Album	US	US R&B	CAN	Record label
1970	L.T.D.	200	38	—	RCA Records
1970	Tasteful Soul	146	26	—	RCA Records
1971	Black Seeds	176	35	—	RCA Records
1972	Bitter Sweet	79	10	30	RCA Records
1973	Afrodisiac	132	16	—	RCA Records
1974	Euphrates River	52	8	48	RCA Records
1975	Rolling Down a Mountainside	90	3	—	RCA Records
1975	Shame on the World	158	27	—	RCA Records
1977	Music Maximus	177	32	—	RCA Records
1980	Ready for Love	—	69	—	RCA Records
1981	I Only Have Eyes for You	—	—	—	RCA Records
1989	I Just Wanna Love You	—	59	—	Polydor
2001	Pure Magic	—	—	—	Magnatar
"—" denotes a recording that did not chart or was not released in that territory.

=== Compilation albums ===
Year	Album	Peak chart positions		Record label
Year	Album	US	US R&B	Record label
1973	Greatest Hits	205	32	RCA Records
1976	Super Hits	201	46	RCA Records
1990	Golden Classics	—	—	Collectables
1990	All Time Greatest Hits	—	—	RCA Records
1996	A Quiet Storm	—	—	RCA Records
2005	Everybody Plays the Fool: The Best of the Main Ingredient	—	—	Legacy/RCA
2007	Spinning Around: The Singles 1967–1975	—	—	Kent
2018	Brotherly Love (The RCA Anthology)	—	—	SoulMusic Records
"—" denotes a recording that did not chart or was not released in that territory.

=== Singles ===
Year	Single	Peak chart positions						Certifications	Album
Year	Single	US	US R&B	US A/C	AUS	CAN	UK	Certifications	Album
1965	"I'm Stuck on You" ^{[A]}	—	—	—	—	—	—		—N/a
1966	"Chapel Bells Are Calling" ^{[B]}	—	—	—	—	—	—		—N/a
1967	"I'm Better Off Without You" ^{[B]}	—	—	—	—	—	—		—N/a
1967	"If You Had a Heart" ^{[B]}	—	—	—	—	—	—		—N/a
1969	"I Was Born to Lose You"	—	—	—	—	—	—		L.T.D.
1969	"Brotherly Love"	—	—	—	—	—	—		L.T.D.
1970	"Can't Stand Your Love"	—	—	—	—	—	—		L.T.D.
1970	"You've Been My Inspiration"	64	25	—	—	—	—		L.T.D.
1970	"I'm Better Off Without You" (re-recorded version)	91	—	—	—	—	—		Tasteful Soul
1970	"I'm So Proud"	49	13	—	—	—	—		Tasteful Soul
1971	"Spinning Around (I Must Be Falling in Love)"	52	7	—	—	—	—		Tasteful Soul
1971	"Black Seeds Keep on Growing"	97	15	—	—	—	—		Black Seeds
1971	"Another Day Has Come"	—	—	—	—	—	—		Black Seeds
1972	"Everybody Plays the Fool"	3	2	25	44	6	54 (Note: Chart position is from the official UK "Breakers List".)	RIAA: Gold	Bitter Sweet
1972	"You've Got to Take It (If You Want It)"	46	18	—	—	—	—		Bitter Sweet
1973	"You Can Call Me Rover"	101	34	—	—	—	—		Afrodisiac
1973	"Girl Blue"	119	51	—	—	—	—		Afrodisiac
1974	"Just Don't Want to Be Lonely"	10	8	42	—	7	27	RIAA: Gold	Euphrates River
1974	"Happiness Is Just Around the Bend"	35	7	—	—	51	—		Euphrates River
1974	"California My Way"	75	48	—	—	—	—		Euphrates River
1975	"Rolling Down a Mountainside"	92	7	—	—	—	—		Rolling Down a Mountainside
1975	"The Good Old Days"	—	45	—	—	—	—		Rolling Down a Mountainside
1975	"Shame on the World"	—	20	—	—	—	—		Shame on the World
1976	"Instant Love"	—	96	—	—	—	—		Music Maximus
1980	"Think Positive"	—	69	—	—	—	—		Ready for Love
1980	"Makes No Diff'rence to Me"	—	—	—	—	—	—		Ready for Love
1981	"Evening of Love"	—	—	—	—	—	—		I Only Have Eyes for You
1981	"I Only Have Eyes for You"	—	—	—	—	—	—		I Only Have Eyes for You
1982	"Party People"	—	—	—	—	—	—		I Only Have Eyes for You
1986	"Do Me Right"	—	75	—	—	—	—		—N/a
1989	"I Just Wanna Love You"	—	15	—	—	—	—		I Just Wanna Love You
1990	"Nothing's Too Good for My Baby"	—	29	—	—	—	—		I Just Wanna Love You
2001	"Will You Marry Me "	—	—	—	—	—	—		Pure Magic
2001	"We Got Us"	—	—	—	—	—	—		Pure Magic
"—" denotes a recording that did not chart or was not released in that territory.

- ^{A} Single credited to The Poets
- ^{B} Single credited to The Insiders
