= Def Jam Recordings discography =

List of recording label releases

This page lists a discography of albums and extended plays released under or distributed by Def Jam Recordings, a division of Universal Music Group, which had been created in 1984. Records distributed by another label, but released under Def Jam, are also included or otherwise reviewed. Also included are albums or EPs that were released under Rush Associated Labels and subsidiaries like Original Black Recordings, DJ West, Def Soul, Disturbing tha Peace, Def Jam South, Roc-A-Fella Records, Murder Inc. Records, and GOOD Music.

== 1980s ==
=== 1983 ===
Artist(s)	Title	Type	Release date	Singles	Chart positions	Certifications	Refs.
Hose	Hose	EP	c. 1983	—N/a			(Note: Despite the label's incorporation in 1984, the first record was released a year prior, indicating that Def Jam was formed in its earlier stages.)

=== 1984 ===
Artist(s)	Title	Type	Release date	Singles	Chart positions	Certifications	Refs.
T La Rock and Jazzy Jay	"It's Yours"	12-inch single	c. 1984	—N/a			(Note: This single was released shortly following Def Jam's incorporation in March 1984.)
LL Cool J	"I Need a Beat"	12-inch single	c. 1984	—N/a			
Beastie Boys	"Rock Hard"	12-inch single	c. 1984	—N/a			

=== 1985 ===
Starting in mid-1985, Def Jam was distributed under Sony Music's Columbia Records division.
Artist(s)	Title	Type	Release date	Singles	Chart positions	Certifications	Refs.
Jazzy Jay	"Def Jam"	12-inch single	c. 1985	—N/a			
MCA and Burzootie	"Drum Machine"	12-inch single	c. 1985	—N/a			
LL Cool J	"I Want You"	12-inch single	c. 1985	—N/a			
Jimmy Spicer	"This Is It"	12-inch single	c. 1985	—N/a			
The Hollis Crew	"It's the Beat"	12-inch single	c. 1985	—N/a			
The Beastie Boys	"She's on It"	12-inch single	September 12, 1985	—N/a			
LL Cool J	Radio	Album	November 18, 1985	"I Can't Live Without My Radio"; "You'll Rock"; "I Can Give You More"; "Rock the Bells"	UK Albums Chart – #71; Billboard 200 – #46; Billboard Urban Albums – #6	RIAA – Platinum	(Note: Radio (1985) is the first official album to be released under Def Jam.)

=== 1986 ===
Artist(s)	Title	Type	Release date	Singles	Chart positions	Certifications	Refs.
Oran "Juice" Jones	Juice	Album	February 12, 1986		Billboard 200 – #44; Billboard Urban Albums – #4	RIAA – Gold	(Note: Released under the Original Black Recordings subsidiary.)
Tashan	Chasin' a Dream	Album	c. 1986	"Chasin' a Dream"	—N/a		
Original Concept	"Knowledge Me"	12-inch single	c. 1986	—N/a			
Junk Yard Band	"The Word & Sardines"	12-inch single	c. 1986	—N/a			
Slayer	Reign in Blood	Album	October 7, 1986	—N/a	Irish Albums Chart – #80; Japanese Albums – #264; UK Albums Chart – #47; Billboard 200 – #94	RIAA – Gold	(Note: Released under Def Jam's Universal Music-sister label, Geffen Records, which at the time was distributed by Warner Records (formerly Warner Bros. Records). Reissues are currently handled by American Recordings through Universal Music Enterprises.)
The Beastie Boys	Licensed to Ill	Album	November 15, 1986	"Hold It Now, Hit It"; "Paul Revere"; "The New Style"; "(You Gotta) Fight for Your Right (To Party!)"; "Brass Monkey"; "No Sleep till Brooklyn"; "Girls"	ARIA Album Chart – #62; Canadian Albums – #5; Dutch Album Top 100 – #15; German Albums Chart – #23; New Zealand Albums Chart – #12; UK Albums Chart – #71; Billboard 200 – #1; Billboard Urban Albums – #2	RIAA – Diamond; MC – 2× Platinum; BPI – Gold	(Note: Licensed to Ill (1986) became the first rap album in Billboard history to top the Billboard 200.)

=== 1987 ===
Artist(s)	Title	Type	Release date	Singles	Chart positions	Certifications	Refs.
Public Enemy	Yo! Bum Rush the Show	Album	February 10, 1987	"Public Enemy No. 1"; "You're Gonna Get Yours"	Billboard 200 – #125; Billboard Urban Albums – #28	RIAA – Gold	
LL Cool J	Bigger and Deffer	Album	May 29, 1987	"I'm Bad"; "I Need Love"	Canadian Albums – #39; Dutch Album Top 100 – #28; German Albums Chart – #35; New Zealand Albums Chart – #23; UK Albums Chart – #54; Billboard 200 – #3; Billboard Urban Albums – #1	RIAA – 2× Platinum; MC – Gold	
Chuck Stanley	The Finer Things in Life	Album	c. 1987	"Never Gonna Let You Go"	—N/a		
Davy D	Davy's Ride	Album	c. 1987	"Davy's Ride"	—N/a		
Various artists	Def Jam: It's the New Style!	Compilation	c. 1987	—N/a			
Oran "Juice" Jones	GTO: Gangsters Takin' Over	Album	October 1987	"Cold Spendin' My Money"	Billboard Urban Albums – #36	—N/a	
Various artists	Less than Zero soundtrack	Album	November 16, 1987	"Rock and Roll All Nite"; "A Hazy Shade of Winter"; "Going Back to Cali"	Billboard 200 – #31; Billboard Urban Albums – #22	RIAA – Gold	
Various artists	Def Jam Meeting	Compilation	c. 1987	—N/a			(Note: A limited release in Japan under Sony Music Japan.)

=== 1988 ===
Artist(s)	Title	Type	Release date	Singles	Chart positions	Certifications	Refs.
Original Concept	Straight from the Basement of Kooley High!	Album	May 10, 1988	—N/a			
Public Enemy	It Takes a Nation of Millions to Hold Us Back	Album	June 28, 1988	"Rebel Without a Pause"; "Bring the Noise"; "Don't Believe the Hype"; "Night of the Living Baseheads"; "Black Steel in the Hour of Chaos"	Dutch Charts – #40; UK Albums Chart – #8; Billboard 200 – #42; Billboard Urban Albums – #1	RIAA – Platinum; BPI – Gold	
Slayer	South of Heaven	Album	July 5, 1988	—N/a	ARIA Charts – #53; Dutch Album Top 100 – #31; Irish Albums Chart – #91; German Albums Chart – #23; Sverigetopplistan – #50; UK Albums Charts – #25; Billboard 200 – #57	RIAA – Gold	
Slick Rick	The Great Adventures of Slick Rick	Album	November 1, 1988	"Children's Story"; "Hey Young World"; "Teenage Love"	Billboard 200 – #31; Billboard Urban Albums – #1	RIAA – Platinum	

=== 1989 ===
Artist(s)	Title	Type	Release date	Singles	Chart positions	Certifications	Refs.
Alyson Williams	Raw	Album	c. 1989	"Sleep Talk"; "My Love Is So Raw"; "I Need Your Lovin'"	UK Albums Chart – #29; Billboard Urban Albums – #25	BPI – Gold	
Blue Magic	From Out of the Blue	Album	c. 1989	—N/a	Billboard Urban Albums – #48	—N/a	
Various artists	Def Jam Classics, Vol. 1	Compilation	c. 1989	—N/a			
LL Cool J	Walking with a Panther	Album	June 9, 1989	"Going Back to Cali"; "I'm That Type of Guy"; "Big Ole Butt"; "One Shot at Love"; "Jingling Baby"	ARIA Charts – #85; Dutch Album Top 100 – #63; New Zealand Albums Chart – #48; UK Albums Chart – #43; Billboard 200 – #6; Billboard Urban Albums – #1	RIAA – Platinum	
Newkirk	Funk City	Album	October 10, 1989	"Sweat You"	—N/a		
3rd Bass	The Cactus Album	Album	November 14, 1989	"Steppin' to the A.M."; "The Gas Face"; "Brooklyn-Queens"	Billboard 200 – #55; Billboard Urban Albums – #5	RIAA – Gold	
Oran "Juice" Jones	To Be Immortal	Album	November 21, 1989	"Pipe Dreams"; "Shaniqua"	—N/a		

== 1990s ==
=== 1990 ===
Between 1990 and 1999, Def Jam Records were distributed and/or produced under the guidance of Rush Associated Labels.
Artist(s)	Title	Type	Release date	Label(s) released in association with	Singles	Chart positions	Certifications	Refs.
Public Enemy	Fear of a Black Planet	Album	April 10, 1990	—N/a	"Fight the Power"; "Welcome to the Terrordome"; "911 Is a Joke"; "Brothers Gonna Work It Out"; "Can't Do Nuttin' for Ya Man"	ARIA Charts – #30; Canadian Albums – #15; Dutch Album Top 100 – #17; German Albums – #30; New Zealand Albums Chart – #15; Sverigetopplistan – #24; Swiss Albums – #19; UK Albums Chart – #4; Billboard 200 – #10; Billboard Urban Albums – #3	RIAA – Platinum; BPI – Gold; MC – Gold	
No Face	Wake Your Daughter Up	Album	c. 1990	No Face	—N/a			
The Afros	Kickin' Afrolistics	Album	c. 1990	JMJ Records	—N/a			
Various artists	Def Jam Classics, Vol. 2	Compilation	c. 1990	—N/a				
Sid and B-Tonn	"Deathwish"	Promotional single	c. 1990	—N/a				
3rd Bass	The Cactus Revisited	Remix album	September 7, 1990	—N/a				
LL Cool J	Mama Said Knock You Out	Album	September 14, 1990	—N/a	"To da Break of Dawn"; "The Boomin' System"; "Around the Way Girl"; "Mama Said Knock You Out"; "6 Minutes of Pleasure"	ARIA Charts – #67; UK Albums Chart – #49; Billboard 200 – #16; Billboard Urban Albums – #2	RIAA – 2× Platinum; MC – Gold	
EPMD	Business as Usual	Album	December 18, 1990	—N/a	"Gold Digger"; "Rampage"; "Give the People"	Billboard 200 – #36; Billboard Urban Albums – #1	RIAA – Gold	

=== 1991 ===
Around late 1991 to mid-1994, Def Jam/RAL releases were distributed by Chaos Recordings, a now-defunct division of Columbia Records.
Artist(s)	Title	Type	Release date	Label(s) released in association with	Singles	Chart positions	Certifications	Refs.
Downtown Science	Downtown Science	Album	January 12, 1991	—N/a	"Room to Breathe"; "Radioactive"	—N/a		
BWP	The Bytches	Album	February 19, 1991	No Face	"Two Minute Brother"	Billboard Urban Albums – #34	—N/a	
Terminator X	Terminator X & The Valley of the Jeep Beets	Album	May 7, 1991	—N/a	"Homey Don't Play That"; "Wanna Be Dancin' (Buck-Whylin')"	Billboard 200 – #97; Billboard Urban Albums – #19	—N/a	
3rd Bass	Derelicts of Dialect	Album	June 18, 1991	—N/a	"Pop Goes the Weasel"	UK Albums Chart – #46; Billboard 200 – #19; Billboard Urban Albums – #10	RIAA – Gold	
Slick Rick	The Ruler's Back	Album	July 2, 1991	—N/a	"I Shouldn't Have Done It"; "Mistakes of a Woman in Love with Other Men"; "It's a Boy"	Billboard 200 – #29; Billboard Urban Albums – #18	—N/a	(Note: Released under Columbia's Chaos recording dimension.)
Nikki D	Daddy's Little Girl	Album	September 3, 1991	—N/a	"Daddy's Little Girl"	Billboard Urban Albums – #54	—N/a	(Note: Daddy's Little Girl (1991) was the first official album released by a female rapper under Def Jam.)
Various artists	Livin' Large soundtrack	Album	September 10, 1991	—N/a				
Nice & Smooth	Ain't a Damn Thing Changed	Album	September 17, 1991	—N/a	"Hip Hop Junkies"; "Sometimes I Rhyme Slow"; "How to Flow"; "Cake & Eat It Too"	Billboard 200 – #141; Billboard Urban Albums – #29	—N/a	
Public Enemy	Apocalypse 91... The Enemy Strikes Black	Album	October 1, 1991	—N/a	"Bring the Noise"; "Can't Truss It"; "Shut 'Em Down"; "Nighttrain"	ARIA Charts – #11; Canadian Albums – #12; Dutch Album Top 100 – #62; German Albums – #38; New Zealand Albums Chart – #5; Sverigetopplistan – #36; UK Albums Chart – #8; Billboard 200 – #4; Billboard Urban Albums – #1	RIAA – Platinum; MC – Gold; BPI – Silver	
Lisette Melendez	Together Forever	Album	c. 1991	Fever Records	"Together Forever"; "A Day in My Life (Without You)"; "Never Say Never"	Japanese Albums – #100; Billboard Top Heatseekers – #7	—N/a	
Sandeé	Only Time Will Tell	Album	c. 1991	Fever Records	"Notice Me"; "Love Desire"	—N/a		
The Don	Wake Up the Party	Album	c. 1991	—N/a				
Resident Alien	"Mr. Boops"	Promotional single	c. 1991	—N/a				

=== 1992 ===
Artist(s)	Title	Type	Release date	Label(s) released in association with	Singles	Chart positions	Certifications	Refs.
Alyson Williams	Alyson Williams	Album	c. 1992	—N/a	"She's Not Your Fool"	Billboard Urban Albums – #31	—N/a	
Fam-Lee	Runs in the Fam-Lee	Album	c. 1992	JMJ Records	—N/a			
Total Look & The Style	Do Some Damage	Album	c. 1992	—N/a				
EPMD	Business Never Personal	Album	July 28, 1992	—N/a	"Crossover"; "Head Banger"	Billboard 200 – #14; Billboard Urban Albums – #5	RIAA – Gold	
MC Serch	Return of the Product	Album	August 25, 1992	—N/a	"Here It Comes"; "Back to the Grill"	Billboard 200 – #103; Billboard Urban Albums – #28; Billboard Top Heatseekers – #2	—N/a	
Public Enemy	Greatest Misses	Greatest hits album	September 15, 1992	Legacy Recordings	—N/a	Dutch Album Top 100 – #72; German Albums – #53; New Zealand Albums Chart – #15; Svrerigetopplistan – #30; UK Albums Chart – #14; Billboard 200 – #13; Billboard Urban Albums – #10	RIAA – Gold	
Redman	Whut? Thee Album	Album	September 22, 1992	—N/a	"Time 4 Sum Aksion"; "Tonight's da Night"; "Blow Your Mind"	Billboard 200 – #49; Billboard Urban Albums – #5	RIAA – Gold	

=== 1993 ===
Artist(s)	Title	Type	Release date	Label(s) released in association with	Singles	Chart positions	Certifications	Refs.
Onyx	Bacdafucup	Album	March 30, 1993	JMJ Records	"Slam"; "Throw Ya Gunz"; "Shifftee"	UK Albums Chart – #59; Billboard 200 – #17; Billboard Urban Albums – #8	RIAA – Platinum	
LL Cool J	14 Shots to the Dome	Album	March 30, 1993	—N/a	"How I'm Comin'"; "Pink Cookies In a Plastic Bag Getting Crushed by Buildings"; "Back Seat (of My Jeep)"; "Stand by Your Man"	German Albums – #74; New Zealand Albums Chart –#36; UK Albums Chart – #74; Billboard 200 – #5; Billboard Urban Albums – #1	RIAA – Gold	
Pete Nice and Daddy Rich	Dust to Dust	Album	April 27, 1993	—N/a	"Rat Bastard"; "Kick the Bobo"	Billboard 200 – #171; Billboard Urban Albums – #50; Billboard Top Heatseekers – #8	—N/a	
Boss	Born Gangstaz	Album	May 25, 1993	—N/a	"Deeper"; "I Don't Give a Fuck"; "Recipe of a Hoe"; "Process of Elimination"	Billboard 200 – #22; Billboard Urban Albums – #3	RIAA – Gold	(Note: Released under the short-lived DJ West subsidiary.)
Erick Sermon	No Pressure	Album	October 19, 1993	Def Squad	"Hittin' Switches"; "Stay Real"	Billboard 200 – #16; Billboard Urban Albums – #2	—N/a	
Domino	Domino	Album	December 7, 1993	Outburst Records	"Getto Jam"; "Sweet Potatoe Pie"; "Money is Everything"; "Long Beach Thang"	Billboard 200 – #39; Billboard Urban Albums – #10	RIAA – Gold	

=== 1994 ===
In May 1994, PolyGram acquired Sony's 50% stake in Def Jam, distributing the label's music under PolyGram Group Distribution.
Artist(s)	Title	Type	Release date	Label(s) released in association with	Singles	Chart positions	Certifications	Refs.
Lisette Mendelez	True to Life	Album	January 18, 1994	Fever Records	"Goody Goody"	Japanese Albums – #3; Billboard Urban Albums – #100; Billboard Top Heatseekers – #28	—N/a	
South Central Cartel	'N Gatz We Truss	Album	May 10, 1994	South G.W.K.	"Servin' 'Em Heat"; "Seventeen Switches"; "Gang Stories"	Billboard 200 – #32; Billboard Urban Albums – #4	—N/a	(Note: Final album released under the Def Jam/Columbia partnership.) (Note: Final album released under the Def Jam/Chaos partnership.)
Warren G	Regulate... G Funk Era	Album	June 7, 1994	Violator	"Regulate"; "This D.J."; "Do You See"	ARIA Charts – #42; Canadian Albums – #27; Dutch Album Top 100 – #19; German Albums #15; New Zealand Albums Chart – #26; Sverigetopplistan – #12; UK Albums Chart – #25; Billboard 200 – #2; Billboard Urban Albums – #1	RIAA – 2× Platinum; MC – Gold; BPI – Silver	(Note: First album released after PolyGram acquired Def Jam.)
Nice & Smooth	Jewel of the Nile	Album	June 28, 1994	—N/a	"Old to the New"; "Return of the Hip Hop Freaks"	Billboard 200 – #66; Billboard Urban Albums – #13	—N/a	
Public Enemy	Muse Sick-n-Hour Mess Age	Album	August 28, 1994	—N/a	"Give It Up"; "I Stand Accused"; "So Whatcha Gone Do Now"	ARIA Charts – #16; Canadian Albums – #20; Dutch Album Top 100 – #39; German Albums – #25; New Zealand Albums Chart – #7; Sverigetopplistan – #20; Swiss Albums – #22; UK Albums Chart – #12; Billboard 200 – #14; Billboard Urban Albums – #4	RIAA – Gold	
Flatlinerz	U.S.A.	Album	September 6, 1994	—N/a	"Rivaz of Red"; "Satanic Verses"; "Live Evil"	Billboard Urban Albums – #65; Billboard Top Heatseekers – #24	—N/a	
Y?N-Vee	Y?N-Vee	Album	October 18, 1994	PMP Records	"Chocolate"; "I'm Goin' Down"; "4Play"	Billboard Urban Albums – #75	—N/a	
Method Man	Tical	Album	November 15, 1994	—N/a	"Bring the Pain"; "Release Yo' Delf"; "I'll Be There for You/You're All I Need to Get By"	Billboard Canadian Albums – #50; Billboard 200 – #4; Billboard Urban Albums – #1	RIAA – Platinum; MC – Platinum; BPI – Gold	
Slick Rick	Behind Bars	Album	November 22, 1994	—N/a	"Behind Bars"; "Sittin' in My Car"	Billboard 200 – #51; Billboard Urban Albums – #11	—N/a	
Redman	Dare Iz a Darkside	Album	November 22, 1994	Def Squad	"Rockafella"; "Can't Wait"	Billboard 200 – #13; Billboard Urban Albums – #1	RIAA – Gold	
La Rockco Tee	Hold on Tight	Album	c. 1994	Outburst Records	—N/a			(Note: Released under RAL/Def Jam, but distributed through PolyGram's Independent Label Sales division.)

=== 1995 ===
From May 1995 to May 1999, Def Jam Records was reinstated as the Def Jam Music Group to further associate itself with the RAL umbrella unit.
Artist(s)	Title	Type	Release date	Label(s) released in association with	Singles	Chart positions	Certifications	Refs.
S.C.C. Presents Murder Squad	Nationwide	Album	Valentine's Day 1995 (February 14)	G.W.K.	"Knock on Wood"; "No Peace"	Billboard 200 – #106; Billboard Top Heatseekers – #1; Billboard Urban Albums – #12	—N/a	
Montell Jordan	This Is How We Do It	Album	April 4, 1995	PMP Records	"This Is How We Do It"; "Somethin' 4 da Honeyz"; "Daddy's Home"	Dutch Album Top 100 – #35; German Albums – #58; New Zealand Albums Chart – #33; UK Albums Chart – #53; Billboard 200 – #12; Billboard Urban Albums – #4	RIAA – Platinum	
MoKenStef	Azz Izz	Album	Independence Day 1995 (July 4)	Outburst Records	"He's Mine"	Billboard 200 – #163; Billboard Urban Albums – #29	—N/a	
Various artists	The Show soundtrack	Album	August 15, 1995	—N/a	"Live!!!"; "What's Up Star?"; "How High"	Billboard 200 – #4; Billboard Urban Albums – #1	RIAA – Platinum	
B.G. Knocc Out and Dresta	Real Brothas	Album	August 15, 1995	Outburst Records	"50/50 Luv"; "Jealousy"	Billboard 200 – #128; Billboard Urban Albums – #15; Billboard Top Heatseekers – #5	—N/a	
The Dove Shack	This Is the Shack	Album	August 22, 1995	G-Funk Entertainment	"Summertime in the LBC"; "We Funk (the G Funk)"; "Bomb Drop"	Billboard 200 – #68; Billboard Urban Albums – #13	—N/a	
Twinz	Conversation	Album	August 22, 1995	G-Funk Entertainment	"Round & Round"; "Eastside LB"	Billboard 200 – #36; Billboard Urban Albums – #8	—N/a	
Mel-Low	It's a B.G. Thing (Life of a Youngster)	Album	c. 1995	C-Poppa Records; Outburst Records	—N/a		—N/a	
Jayo Felony	Take a Ride	Album	October 24, 1995	JMJ Records	"Sherm Stick"	Billboard Urban Albums – #65	—N/a	
Onyx	All We Got Iz Us	Album	October 24, 1995	JMJ Records	"Live Niguz"; "Last Dayz"	Billboard 200 – #22; Billboard Urban Albums – #2	RIAA – Gold	
LL Cool J	Mr. Smith	Album	November 7, 1995	—N/a	"Hey Lover"; "Doin' It"; "I Shot Ya"; "Loungin"	ARIA Charts – #97; Canadian Albums – #53; Dutch Album Top 100 – #33; German Albums – #75; Sverigetopplistan – #60; UK Albums Charts – #90; Billboard 200 – #20; Billboard Urban Albums – #4	RIAA – 2× Platinum; MC – Gold; BPI – Silver	
Erick Sermon	Double or Nothing	Album	November 7, 1995	Def Squad	"Bomdigi"; "Welcome"	Billboard 200 – #35; Billboard Urban Albums – #6	RIAA – Gold	
Capleton	Prophecy	Album	November 7, 1995	African Stars	"Wings of the Morning"	—N/a		
Various artists	Def Jam Music Group, Inc. – 10th Year Anniversary	Box set	November 21, 1995	—N/a				

=== 1996 ===
Artist(s)	Title	Type	Release date	Label(s) released in association with	Singles	Chart positions	Certifications	Refs.
Domino	Physical Funk	Album	April 2, 1996	Outburst Records	"Physical Funk"; "So Fly"	Billboard 200 – #152; Billboard Urban Albums – #34	—N/a	
Various artists	The Nutty Professor soundtrack	Album	June 4, 1996	—N/a	"Ain't No Playa"; "Touch Me, Tease Me"; "I Like"; "Last Night"; "Ain't Nobody"	New Zealand Albums Chart – #10; UK R&B Albums – #7; Billboard 200 – #8; Billboard Urban Albums – #1	RIAA – Platinum	
Code 3	Code 3	Album	August 13, 1996	Outburst Records	"Humpin' Bumpin'"	—N/a		
Case	Case	Album	August 13, 1996	Spoiled Rotten Entertainment	"Touch Me, Tease Me"; "More to Love"; "Don't Be Afraid"; "I Gotcha"	Billboard 200 – #42; Billboard Urban Albums – #7	RIAA – Gold	
Montell Jordan	More...	Album	August 27, 1996	—N/a	"I Like"; "Falling"; "What's on Tonight"	UK Albums – #66; Billboard 200 – #47; Billboard Urban Albums – #14	RIAA – Gold	(Note: Released under the Def Soul subsidiary.)
Richie Rich	Seasoned Veteran	Album	November 5, 1996	41510	"Let's Ride"; "Do G's Get to Go to Heaven?"; "Touch Myself (Remix)"	Billboard 200 – #35; Billboard Urban Albums – #11	—N/a	
LL Cool J	All World: Greatest Hits	Greatest hits album	November 5, 1996	—N/a		Dutch Album Top 100 – #31; German Albums – #46; Sverigetopplistan – #32; Swiss Albums – #45; UK Albums Chart; Billboard 200 – #29; Billboard Urban Albums – #21	RIAA – Platinum; MC – Gold; BPI – Gold	
Foxy Brown	Ill Na Na	Album	November 19, 1996	Violator; Trackmasters Entertainment	"I'll Be"; "Get Me Home"	Canadian Albums – #41; Dutch Album Top 100 – #80; German Albums – #27; UK Albums Chart – #98; UK R&B Albums – #15; Billboard 200 – #7; Billboard Urban Albums – #2	RIAA – 2× Platinum; MC – Gold; BPI – Silver	
Flesh-n-Bone	T.H.U.G.S.	Album	November 19, 1996	Mo Thugs	"World So Cruel"	Billboard 200 – #23; Billboard Urban Albums – #8	RIAA – Gold	
Redman	Muddy Waters	Album	December 10, 1996	Def Squad	"It's Like That (My Big Brother)"; "Whateva Man"; "Pick It Up"; "Smoke Buddah"	Billboard 200 – #12; Billboard Urban Albums – #1	RIAA – Gold	
Various artists	Codice Rap	Compilation	c. 1996	Mercury Records UK	—N/a			(Note: A limited released in the United Kingdom, Ireland and France.)
Shug	86 the Madness	Album	c. 1996	Nightstalker Records	—N/a			

=== 1997 ===
Artist(s)	Title	Type	Release date	Label(s) released in association with	Singles	Chart positions	Certifications	Refs.
Warren G	Take a Look Over Your Shoulder (Reality)	Album	March 25, 1997	G-Funk Entertainment	"What's Love Got to Do With It"; "I Shot the Sheriff"; "Smokin' Me Out"	ARIA Charts – #22; Canadian Albums – #20; French Albums – #14; German Albums – #8; New Zealand Albums Chart – #10; Sverigetopplistan – #25; Swiss Albums – #9; UK Albums – #20; Billboard 200 – #11; Billboard Urban Albums – #4	RIAA – Gold	
South Central Cartel	All Day Everyday	Album	June 3, 1997	—N/a	"All Day Everyday"; "S.C.G.'z"	Billboard 200 – #178; Billboard Urban Albums – #35	—N/a	
Cru	Da Dirty 30	Album	June 15, 1997	Violator; ByStorm Entertainment	"Bubblin'"; "Just Another Case"	Billboard 200 – #102; Billboard Urban Albums – #26	—N/a	
Various artists	Def Jam's How to Be a Player soundtrack	Album	August 5, 1997	PolyGram Soundtracks	"Big Bad Mamma"	Billboard 200 – #7; Billboard Urban Albums – #2	RIAA – Gold	
Various artists	Def Jam's Greatest Hits	Compilation	September 9, 1997	—N/a				
Various artists	Def Jam's Greatest Hits: Hardcore	Compilation	September 9, 1997	—N/a				
EPMD	Back in Business	Album	September 16, 1997	—N/a	"Da Joint"; "Richter Scale"	UK Albums Chart – #100; Billboard 200 – #16; Billboard Urban Albums – #4	RIAA – Gold	
LL Cool J	Phenomenon	Album	October 14, 1997	—N/a	"Phenomenon"; "Father"; "4, 3, 2, 1"; "Hot Hot Hot"; "Candy"; "Starsky & Hutch"	ARIA Charts – #88; Canadian Albums – #7; Dutch Album Top 100 – #48; German Albums – #24; New Zealand Albums – #39; Sverigetopplistan – #57; Swiss Albums – #48; UK Albums Chart – #37; Billboard 200 – #7; Billboard Urban Albums – #4	RIAA – Platinum; MC – Platinum	
Jay-Z	In My Lifetime, Vol. 1	Album	November 4, 1997	(Note: In My Lifetime, Vol. 1 (1997) and Vol. 2... Hard Knock Life (1998) were both distributed in European markets by BMG's Northwestside Records, an RCA/Arista sister subsidiary, instead of using Mercury as the European distributor likewise as it is general on European Def Jam releases.)	"(Always Be My) Sunshine"; "The City Is Mine"; "Wishing on a Star" (UK version)	UK Albums – #78; Billboard 200 – #3; Billboard Urban Albums – #2	RIAA – Platinum	(Note: The first two albums (In My Lifetime, Vol. 1 and Ghetto Cyrano) to be released under Roc-A-Fella Records following Def Jam's acquisition of the label in 1997.) (Note: Released under Roc-A-Fella Records.)
Christión	Ghetto Cyrano	Album	November 4, 1997	—N/a	"Full of Smoke"; "I Wanna Get Next to You"	Billboard 200 – #146; Billboard Urban Albums – #23	—N/a	
Capleton	I-Testament	Album	November 25, 1997	African Stars	"Original Man"; "Hurts My Heart"	Billboard Reggae Albums – #3	—N/a	
Various artists	The Rapsody Overture: Hip Hop Meets Classic	Album	Remix album	c. 1997	Mercury Records	—N/a		
Various artists	Yo! MTV Raps	Compilation	MTV	c. 1997		—N/a		

=== 1998 ===
On December 10, 1998, Seagram completed its seven-month plan to acquire PolyGram (including its music division which Def Jam was under).
Artist(s)	Title	Type	Release date	Label(s) released in association with	Singles	Chart positions	Certifications	Refs.
Playa	Cheers 2 U	Album	March 24, 1998	Blackground Records (2.0)	"Don't Stop the Music"; "Cheers 2 U"; "All the Way"	Billboard 200 – #86; Billboard Urban Albums – #19	—N/a	
Montell Jordan	Let's Ride	Album	March 31, 1998	—N/a	"Let's Ride"; "I Can Do That"	Dutch Album Top 100 – #82; German Albums – #75; Billboard 200 – #20; Billboard Urban Albums – #8	RIAA – Gold	
Public Enemy	He Got Game soundtrack	Album	April 28, 1998	—N/a	"He Got Game"	UK Albums – #50; Billboard 200 – #26; Billboard Urban Albums – #10	—N/a	
Various artists	Streets Is Watching soundtrack	Album	May 12, 1998	—N/a	"Love for Free"; "It's Alright"	Billboard 200 – #27; Billboard Urban Albums – #3	RIAA – Gold	
DMX	It's Dark and Hell Is Hot	Album	May 19, 1998	Ruff Ryders Entertainment	"Ruff Ryders' Anthem"; "Get at Me Dog"; "Stop Being Greedy"; "How's It Goin' Down"	Canadian Albums – #15; UK Albums – #89; Billboard 200 – #1; Billboard Urban Albums – #1	RIAA – 4× Platinum; MC – Platinum; BPI – Gold	
Onyx	Shut 'Em Down	Album	June 2, 1998	JMJ Records	"The Worst"; "Shut 'em Down"; "React"; "Broke Willie"; "Ghetto Starz"	UK Albums Chart – #136; Billboard 200 – #10; Billboard Urban Albums – #3	RIAA – Gold	
Def Squad	El Niño	Album	June 30, 1998	Def Squad; Jive Records; (Note: El Nino (1998), Best of Both Worlds (2002) and Unfinished Business (2004) suffered a coin toss, due to record label obligations disputed by both Def Jam and Jive Records. El Nino was released under Def Jam and distributed by PolyGram in North America and Europe, while Jive's parent company, Zomba, distributed the album abroad. Best of Both Worlds and Unfinished Business are distributed by Def Jam in the United States and Canada and by Jive/Zomba under license from Def Jam's former parent company Sony Music (at the time known as Sony BMG) internationally.)	"Full Cooperation"	Billboard 200 – #2; Billboard Urban Albums – #1	RIAA – Gold	
Jayo Felony	Whatcha Gonna Do?	Album	August 25, 1998	—N/a	"Whatcha Gonna Do?"; "Nitty Gritty"	Billboard 200 – #46; Billboard Urban Albums – #8	—N/a	
Various artists	Rush Hour soundtrack	Album	September 15, 1998	New Line Records; PolyGram Soundtracks	"How Deep Is Your Love"; "Faded Pictures"; "Can I Get A..."; "Nasty Girl"; "You'll Never Miss Me ('Til I'm Gone)"	Ö3 Austria Top 40 – #49; German Albums – #44; New Zealand Albums Chart – #17; Billboard 200 – #5; Billboard Urban Albums – #2	RIAA – Platinum	
Jay-Z	Vol. 2... Hard Knock Life	Album	September 29, 1998		"Can I Get A..."; "Hard Knock Life (Ghetto Anthem)"; "Money, Cash, Hoes"; "Jigga What, Jigga Who (Originator 99)"	Canadian Albums – #20; German Albums – #76; Sverigetopplistan – #34; Swiss Albums – #49; UK Albums Chart – #109; Billboard 200 – #1; Billboard Urban Albums – #1	RIAA – 5× Platinum; MC – Platinum; BPI – Silver	
Various artists	Belly (Original Motion Picture Soundtrack)	Album	November 3, 1998	—N/a	"Grand Finale"; "Devil's Pie"; "Top Shotter"; "What About"	Billboard 200 – #5; Billboard Urban Albums – #2	RIAA – Gold	
Method Man	Tical 2000: Judgement Day	Album	November 17, 1998	—N/a	"Judgement Day"; "Break Ups 2 Make Ups"	Canadian Albums – #5; UK Albums Chart – #49; Billboard 200 – #2; Billboard Urban Albums – #1	RIAA – Platinum; MC – Platinum; BPI – Silver	
Redman	Doc's da Name 2000	Album	December 8, 1998	Def Squad	"I'll Bee Dat!"; "Da Goodness"; "Let Da Monkey Out"	Canadian Albums – #19; UK Albums – #145; Billboard 200 – #11; Billboard Urban Albums – #1	RIAA – 2× Platinum; MC – Gold	
DJ Clue?	The Professional	Album	December 15, 1998	Desert Storm Records; Roc-A-Fella Records	"Ruff Ryders' Anthem" (Remix)	Billboard 200 – #26; Billboard Urban Albums – #3	RIAA – Platinum	
DMX	Flesh of My Flesh, Blood of My Blood	Album	December 22, 1998	Ruff Ryders Entertainment	"Slippin'"; "No Love 4 Me"	Canadian Albums – #42; German Albums – #61; UK Albums – #119; Billboard 200 – #1; Billboard Urban Albums – #1	RIAA – 3× Platinum; MC – Gold; BPI – Gold	
Various artists	Survival of the Illest – Live from 125 N.Y.C.	Compilation / Live album	c. 1998	PolyGram TV; Jive Records	—N/a			

=== 1999 ===
In mid-January 1999, following the merger of PolyGram and MCA-related labels into Universal Music Group, Def Jam's operations as a label were merged with Island and Mercury Records to become the Island Def Jam Music Group. The umbrella name didn't hold copyrights on Def Jam releases until the summer of that year. Also, that same year, due to the Island Def Jam consolidation, Rush Associated Labels were folded.
Artist(s)	Title	Type	Release date	Label(s) released in association with	Singles	Chart positions	Certifications	Refs.
Foxy Brown	Chyna Doll	Album	January 26, 1999	Violator	"Hot Spot"; "My Life"; "I Can't"; "J.O.B."	Canadian Albums – #6; Dutch Album Top 100 – #42; French Albums – #35; German Albums – #7; Swiss Albums – #18; UK Albums – #51; UK R&B Albums – #5; Billboard 200 – #1; Billboard Urban Albums – #1	RIAA – Platinum	(Note: With Chyna Doll (1999), Foxy Brown joins a list of five female rappers to have number-one albums on the Billboard 200, alongside Lauryn Hill, Eve, Nicki Minaj and Cardi B.)
Case	Personal Conversation	Album	April 20, 1999 (Note: The release date of Personal Conversation (1999) would commence hours before the Columbine High School massacre that day.)	Spoiled Rotten Entertainment	"Faded Pictures"; "Happily Ever After"	Billboard 200 – #33; Billboard Urban Albums – #5	RIAA – Gold	(Note: Final album to be distributed by PolyGram due to its merger with Universal Music Group the year prior.)
Slick Rick	The Art of Storytelling	Album	May 25, 1999	—N/a	"Street Talkin'"	Billboard 200 – #8; Billboard Urban Albums – #1	RIAA – Gold	(Note: First album to be released by Def Jam under the distribution of Universal Music following the PolyGram and MCA merger of labels.)
Ja Rule	Venni Vetti Vecci	Album	June 1, 1999	—N/a	"Holla Holla"; "Daddy's Little Baby"	Canadian Albums – #20; Billboard 200 – #3; Billboard Urban Albums – #1	RIAA – Platinum	(Note: Released under Murder Inc. Records.)
Biohazard	New World Disorder	Album	June 8, 1999	King Recordings; Mercury Records	"Resist"; "Switchback"; "End of My Rope"; "New World Disorder"	German Albums – #40; Billboard 200 – #187	—N/a	(Note: Final album to be released under the in name only holding of Rush Associated Labels, further indicating that Def Jam marketed and distributed this album, despite New World Disorder (1999) only being published under the guidance of Mercury.) (Note: First album to be released under the Island Def Jam Music Group.)
EPMD	Out of Business	Album	July 20, 1999	Def Squad; Hit Squad	"Symphony 2000"	Billboard 200 – #13; Billboard Urban Albums – #2	—N/a	(Note: First album by Def Jam to be released under the Island Def Jam Music Group.)
Imiskoumbria	2030	Album	August 3, 1999	Imiz Biz; Universal Music Greece	—N/a			
Memphis Bleek	Coming of Age	Album	August 3, 1999	—N/a	"Memphis Bleek Is..."; "What You Think of That?"	Billboard 200 – #7; Billboard Urban Albums – #1	RIAA – Gold	
Violator artists	Violator: The Album	Compilation	August 10, 1999	Violator	"Say What?"; "Vivrant Thing"	Billboard 200 – #8; Billboard Urban Albums – #1	RIAA – Gold	
Various artists	The Source Hip Hop Music Awards 1999	Compilation	August 17, 1999	The Source	—N/a	Billboard 200 – #53; Billboard Urban Albums – #45	—N/a	
Method Man and Redman	Blackout!	Album	September 28, 1999	—N/a	"Tear It Off"; "Da Rockwilder"; "Y.O.U."	Canadian Albums – #3; Dutch Album Top 100 – #36; French Albums – #33; German Albums – #36; UK Albums – #45; Billboard 200 – #3; Billboard Urban Albums – #1	RIAA – Platinum; MC – Platinum; BPI – Gold	
Montell Jordan	Get It On...Tonite	Album	November 9, 1999	—N/a	"Get It On Tonite"	Dutch Album Top 100 – #28; German Albums – #30; Swiss Albums – #49; Billboard 200 – #32; Billboard Urban Albums – #4	RIAA – Gold	
Sisqó	Unleash the Dragon	Album	November 30, 1999	Dragon Records, LLC.	"Got to Get It"; "Incomplete"; "Thong Song"; "Unleash the Dragon"	ARIA Charts – #28; Ultratop Belgian Albums (Flanders) – #26; Ultratop Belgian Albums (Wallonia) – #41; Canadian Albums – #8; Dutch Album Top 100 – #9; French Albums – #27; German Albums – #54; New Zealand Albums – #23; Norwegian Top 40 Albums – #19; Sverigetopplistan – #45; Swiss Albums – #36; UK Albums – #15; Billboard 200 – #2	RIAA – 6× Platinum; MC – 2× Platinum; BPI – Gold; ARIA – Gold; SNEP – Gold; BVMI – Gold; NVPI – Gold	
Various artists	The Source Presents: Hip Hop Hits, Vol. 3	Compilation	November 30, 1999	The Source	—N/a	Billboard 200 – #45; Billboard Urban Albums – #29	—N/a	
Funkmaster Flex and Big Kap	The Tunnel	Album	December 7, 1999	Franchise Entertainment	"We in Here"; "Ill Bomb"; "Confrontation"	Billboard 200 – #35; Billboard Urban Albums – #3	RIAA – Gold	
DMX	... And Then There Was X	Album	December 21, 1999	Ruff Ryders Entertainment	"Party Up (Up in Here)"; "What's My Name?"; "What These Bitches Want"	Canadian Albums – #6; Dutch Album Top 100 – #64; German Albums – #46; UK Albums – #108; Billboard 200 – #1; Billboard Urban Albums – #1	RIAA – 5× Platinum; MC – Platinum; BPI – Gold	
Jay-Z	Vol. 3... Life and Times of S. Carter	Album	December 28, 1999	—N/a	"Do It Again (Put Ya Hands Up"; "Big Pimpin'"; "Things That U Do"; "Anything" (European version)	Canadian Albums – #8; Swiss Albums – #75; UK Albums Charts – #155; Billboard 200 – #1; Billboard Urban Albums – #1	RIAA – 3× Platinum; MC – Gold; BPI – Silver	
Various artists	Def Jam 2000: Respect the Music. Respect the Culture. Respect the Name.	Compilation	c. 1999	—N/a				(Note: A promotional release in household retailers like Best Buy, Walmart or Target.)

== 2000s ==
=== 2000 ===
During this period, the Def Jam 2000 campaign began to expand after being promoted from late 1998 to 1999. Def Jam 2000 was marketed and sponsored in order for the label to celebrate the 3rd millennium, which actually started in 2001, causing the campaign to end in December 2000 in error.
Artist(s)	Title	Type	Release date	Label(s) released in association with	Singles	Chart positions	Certifications	Refs.
Beanie Sigel	The Truth	Album	February 29, 2000	Black Friday Management	"Anything"; "The Truth"; "Remember Them Days"	Billboard 200 – #5; Billboard Urban Albums – #2	RIAA – Gold	
The Murderers	Irv Gotti Presents: The Murderers	Compilation	March 21, 2000	—N/a	"We Don't Give a Fuck"; "Vita, Vita, Vita"	German Albums – #74; UK R&B Albums – #19; Billboard 200 – #15; Billboard Urban Albums – #2	—N/a	
Kelly Price	Mirror Mirror	Album	June 27, 2000	—N/a	"You Should've Told Me"; "Good Love"; "As We Lay"; "Love Sets You Free"	Billboard 200 – #5; Billboard Urban Albums – #3	RIAA – Platinum	
Various artists	Nutty Professor II: The Klumps soundtrack	Album	July 11, 2000	—N/a	"Doesn't Really Matter"; "Hey Papi"; "Not Even Gonna Trip" (UK edition); "Just Friends (Sunny)"; "Even If"	Billboard 200 – #4; Billboard Urban Albums – #1	RIAA – Platinum	
Various artists	The Source Hip Hop Music Awards 2000	Compilation	August 29, 2000	The Source	—N/a	Billboard 200 – #17; Billboard Urban Albums – #16	—N/a	
DJ Clue	Backstage: Music Inspired by the Film	Album	August 29, 2000	Desert Storm Records	"My Mind Right"; "Best of Me, Part 2"	Billboard 200 – #6; Billboard Urban Albums – #1	RIAA – Gold	
LL Cool J	G.O.A.T.	Album	September 11, 2000	—N/a	"Imagine That"; "You and Me"	ARIA Charts – #65; Canadian Albums – #5; Dutch Album Top 100 – #35; French Albums – #56; German Albums – #17; Swiss Albums – #13; UK Albums Chart – #29; Billboard 200 – #1; Billboard Urban Albums – #1	RIAA – Platinum; MC – Gold	(Note: G.O.A.T. (2000) became LL Cool J's first and only number-one Billboard 200 album in his career.)
Ja Rule	Rule 3:36	Album	October 3, 2000	—N/a	"Between Me and You"; "Put It on Me"; "I Cry"	Canadian Albums – #8; German Albums – #72; UK Albums Chart – #83; Billboard 200 – #1; Billboard Urban Albums – #1	RIAA – 3× Platinum; MC – Platinum; BPI – Silver	
Ludacris	Back for the First Time	Album	October 17, 2000	—N/a	"What's Your Fantasy"; "Southern Hospitality"	Canadian Albums – #8; UK Albums – #160; Billboard 200 – #4; Billboard Urban Albums – #2	RIAA – 3× Platinum; MC – Gold	(Note: Released under Disturbing tha Peace.) (Note: Released under the Def Jam South subsidiary.)
Jay-Z	The Dynasty: Roc La Familia (Note: The Dynasty: Roc La Familia (2000) was originally planned as a compilation album to showcase Roc-A-Fella artists, but Def Jam reversed the project as a Jay-Z solo album.)	Album	Halloween 2000 (October 31)	—N/a	"I Just Wanna Love U (Give It 2 Me)"; "Change the Game"; "Guilty Until Proven Innocent"	Canadian Albums – #5; German Albums – #98; Swiss Albums – #89; UK Albums Chart – #86; Billboard 200 – #1; Billboard Urban Albums – #1	RIAA – 2× Platinum; BPI – Silver	
Musiq Soulchild	Aijuswanaseing (I Just Wanna Sing)	Album	November 14, 2000	Mama's Boys Music	"Just Friends (Sunny)"; "Love"; "Girl Next Door"	Billboard 200 – #24; Billboard Urban Albums – #4	RIAA – Platinum	
Memphis Bleek	The Understanding	Album	December 5, 2000	Get Low Records	"Is That Your Chick (The Lost Verses)"; "Do My..."; "My Mind Right"	Billboard 200 – #16; Billboard Urban Albums – #1	RIAA – Gold	
Various artists	The Source Presents: Hip Hop Hits, Vol. 4	Compilation	December 12, 2000	The Source	—N/a	Billboard 200 – #43; Billboard Urban Albums – #35	—N/a	
La Klikaria	La Klikaria	Album	c. 2000	Universal Music Greece; Imiz Biz	—N/a			
Spezialitz	G.B.Z.-Oholika II	Album	c. 2000	G.B.Z. Imperium	"Wollt Ihr...?!"; "Tut Was Ihr Nicht Lassen Könnt"	—N/a		(Note: Released under Def Jam Germany.)
Creutzfeld & Jakob	Gottes Werk Und Creutzfelds Beitrag	Album	c. 2000	—N/a	"Anfangsstadium"	—N/a		
Der Klan	Flash Punks	Album	c. 2000	Put Da Needle to Da Records	—N/a			
Nitro Microphone Underground	Nitro Microphone Underground	Album	c. 2000	—N/a				(Note: Released under Def Jam Japan.)
Various artists	Soul Food: The Best R&B of 2000	Compilation	c. 2000	—N/a				

=== 2001 ===
Artist(s)	Title	Type	Release date	Label(s) released in association with	Singles	Chart positions	Certifications	Refs.
Various artists	Def Jam 1985–2001: The History of Hip-Hop, Vol. 1	Compilation	February 20, 2001	—N/a				(Note: Released under license through Universal Music Enterprises.)
DJ Clue?	The Professional 2	Album	February 27, 2001	Desert Storm Records	"Back 2 Life 2001"	Canadian Albums – #16; French Albums – #98; German Albums – #82; Billboard 200 – #3; Billboard Urban Albums – #1	RIAA – Gold	
Case	Open Letter	Album	April 24, 2001	—N/a	"Missing You"; "Not Your Friend"	Billboard 200 – #5; Billboard Urban Albums – #2	RIAA – Gold	
Aaron Soul	"Ring, Ring, Ring"	Single	May 22, 2001	Czar Entertainment	—N/a	UK singles chart – #14; UK Dance Singles – #15	BPI – Gold	(Note: "Ring, Ring, Ring" was included on the soundtrack to the film, Bridget Jones's Diary (2001).)
Redman	Malpractice	Album	May 22, 2001	Def Squad	"Let's Get Dirty (I Can't Get in da Club)"; "Smash Sumthin'"	Ultratop Belgian Albums (Wallonia) – #39; Canadian Albums – #18; French Albums – #40; German Albums – #62; Swiss Albums – #74; UK Albums Chart – #57; Billboard 200 – #4; Billboard Urban Albums – #1	RIAA – Gold; BPI – Silver	
Various artists	The Fast and the Furious soundtrack	Album	June 5, 2001	UMG Soundtracks	"Put It On Me" (Remix)	ARIA Charts – #25; Ö3 Austria Top 40 – #26; Ultratop Belgian Albums (Flanders) – #39; Ultratop Belgian Albums (Wallonia) – #50; Canadian Albums – #6; French Albums – #99; German Albums – #19; New Zealand Albums Chart – #5; Swiss Albums – #76; Billboard 200 – #7; Billboard Soundtrack Albums – #1; Billboard Urban Albums – #5	RIAA – Platinum; MC – Platinum; ARIA – Gold	
Sisqó	Return of Dragon	Album	June 19, 2001	Dragon Records, LLC.	"Can I Live?"; "Dance for Me"	Ultratop Belgian Albums (Flanders) – #39; Ultratop Belgian Albums (Wallonia) – #22; Dutch Album Top 100 – #27; French Albums – #32; German Albums – #22; Swiss Albums – #17; UK Albums – #22; Billboard 200 – #7; Billboard Urban Albums – #3	RIAA – Platinum; BPI – Silver	
Beanie Sigel	The Reason	Album	June 26, 2001	Black Friday Management; Get Dat Dough Productions, LLC.	"Beanie (Mack Bitch)"; "Think It's a Game"	Billboard 200 – #5; Billboard Urban Albums – #2	RIAA – Gold	
Foxy Brown	Broken Silence	Album	July 17, 2001	Violator; Ill Na Na Entertainment	"Oh Yeah"; "BK Anthem"; "Candy"	Ultratop Belgian Albums (Wallonia) – #44; Canadian Albums – #26; Dutch Album Top 100 – #77; French Albums – #58; German Albums – #26; Swiss Albums – #15; UK Albums – #93; UK R&B Albums – #19; Billboard 200 – #5; Billboard Urban Albums – #3	RIAA – Gold	
Various artists	Rush Hour 2 soundtrack	Album	July 31, 2001	Rat Records; UMG Soundtracks	"Area Codes"; "How It's Gonna Be"	French Albums – #149; New Zealand Albums – #22; Billboard 200 – #11; Billboard Urban Albums – #11; Billboard Soundtrack Albums – #1	RIAA – Gold; RIAJ – Gold	
Various artists	The Source Hip Hop Music Awards 2001	Compilation	August 14, 2001	The Source	—N/a	Billboard 200 – #34; Billboard Urban Albums – #28	—N/a	
Jay-Z	The Blueprint	Album	September 11, 2001 (Note: The Blueprint (2001) was released on the same date as the September 11 attacks.)	—N/a	"Izzo (H.O.V.A.)"; "Girls, Girls, Girls"; "Song Cry"	Canadian Albums – #3; Dutch Album Top 100 – #51; French Albums – #73; German Albums – #55; Norwegian Top 40 Albums – #36; Scottish Albums – #56; Sverigetopplistan – #30; Swiss Albums – #59; UK Albums Chart – #30; Billboard 200 – #1; Billboard Urban Albums – #1	RIAA – 2× Platinum; MC – Platinum; BPI – Gold	
Ja Rule	Pain Is Love	Album	October 2, 2001	—N/a	"Livin' It Up"; "Always on Time"; "Down Ass Bitch"; "I'm Real"	ARIA Charts – #6; Ultratop Belgian Albums (Flanders) – #24; Ultratop Belgian Albums (Wallonia) – #24; Canadian Albums – #3; Dutch Album Top 100 – #17; French Albums – #34; German Albums – #38; Irish Albums Chart – #24; New Zealand Albums – #1; Swiss Albums – #28; UK Albums – #8; Billboard 200 – #1; Billboard Urban Albums – #1	RIAA – 4× Platinum; MC – 3× Platinum; BPI – Platinum; ARIA – Platinum; RMNZ – Platinum	
Christina Milian	Christina Milian (Note: Milian's self-titled debut album was set for a release in the United States on September 25, 2001, but due to the September 11 attacks, the American release date was cancelled. Therefore, the album was released internationally on October 9 unaffected. Advanced copies of the album are available and the album itself has since been available for streaming, as of 2020.)	Album	October 9, 2001	—N/a	"AM to PM"; "When You Look at Me"	Dutch Album Top 100 – #36; French Albums – #138; German Albums – #51; Swiss Albums – #98; UK Albums Chart – #23	BPI – Gold; RIAJ – Gold	
DMX	The Great Depression	Album	October 23, 2001	Ruff Ryders Entertainment	"Who We Be"; "We Right Here"; "I Miss You"	ARIA Charts – #99; Canadian Albums – #1; Dutch Album Top 100 – #25; German Albums – #10; Irish Albums Chart – #26; New Zealand Albums Chart – #38; Swiss Albums – #60; UK Albums Chart – #20; Billboard 200 – #1; Billboard Urban Albums – #1	RIAA – 2× Platinum; BPI – Gold; MC – Platinum	
Ludacris	Word of Mouf	Album	November 6, 2001	—N/a	"Area Codes"; "Move Bitch"; "Saturday (Oooh! Ooooh!)"; "Rollout (My Business)"	Canadian Albums – #10; German Albums – #98; UK Albums Chart – #57; UK R&B Albums – #12; Billboard 200 – #3; Billboard Urban Albums – #1	RIAA – 3× Platinum; MC – Platinum; BPI – Gold	
Kelly Price	One Love – A Christmas Album	Album	November 27, 2001	—N/a	"In Love at Christmas"	Billboard 200 – #176	—N/a	
Various artists	How High soundtrack	Album	December 11, 2001	UMG Soundtracks	"Part II"	Billboard 200 – #38; Billboard Urban Albums – #6; Billboard Soundtrack Albums – #2	—N/a	
Various artists	The Source Presents: Hip Hop Hits, Vol. 5	Compilation	December 18, 2001	The Source	—N/a	Billboard 200 – #48; Billboard Urban Albums – #37	—N/a	
Jay-Z (Note: Because The Roots have physical involvement in this live album, it is sometimes billed as a collaboration between Jay-Z and the Roots.)	Jay-Z: MTV Unplugged	Album	December 18, 2001	—N/a	—N/a	Billboard 200 – #20; Billboard Urban Albums – #18	RIAA – Gold	
Various artists	Westwood	Compilation	c. 2001	—N/a	—N/a			(Note: Released under Def Jam UK.)
Various artists	Westwood, Vol. 2	Compilation	c. 2001	—N/a	—N/a			
Public Enemy	20th Century Masters – The Millenium Collection: The Best of Public Enemy	Greatest hits album	c. 2001	—N/a	—N/a			
Imiskoumbria	Τη Λόλα Απ'τη Φωτιά Ποιός Θα τη Βγάλει; (Ti Lola ap'ti Fotia Pios Tha ti Vghali?/Who's Going to Get Lola Out of the Fire?)	Album	c. 2001	Imiz Biz; Universal Music Greece	"Πάμε όλοι μαζί σε μια παραλία (Let's All Go To A Beach)"	—N/a		
Goin' Through	Συμβόλαιο Τιμής	Album	c. 2001	Family the Label; Universal Music Greece	—N/a			
DMX	Angel	Video album	c. 2001	Ruff Ryders Entertainment; Universal Music DVD	—N/a			
Various artists	Def Jam: Unstoppable	Compilation	c. 2001	—N/a				
Konkret Finn	Reim, Rausch und Randale	Album	c. 2001	—N/a				
Pyranja	I'm Kreis	EP	c. 2001	—N/a				
Phillie MC	Schöne Neue Welt	Album	c. 2001	—N/a				
Various artists	Battle of the Year – The Soundtrack	Album	c. 2001	—N/a				
Kool Savas	Haus & Boot	EP	c. 2001	—N/a				
Da Fource	Überlegen	Album	c. 2001	—N/a				
Dabo	Platinum Tongue	Album	c. 2001	—N/a				
Various artists	Def Jam 2001	Compilation	c. 2001	—N/a				
Deema	One Man Standing	Album	c. 2001	Bear Entertainment	—N/a			
Bintia	B.I.N.T.I.A.	Album	c. 2001	—N/a	"Groupiez"; "Uber Den Wolken"	—N/a		

=== 2002 ===
Artist(s)	Title	Type	Release date	Label(s) released in association with	Singles	Chart positions	Certifications	Refs.
State Property	State Property soundtrack	Album	January 19, 2002	Black Friday Management	"Roc the Mic"	Billboard 200 – #14; Billboard Urban Albums – #1; Billboard Soundtrack Albums – #2		
Montell Jordan	Montell Jordan	Album	February 26, 2002	—N/a	"You Must Have Been"	Dutch Album Top 100 – #63; French Albums – #90; German Albums – #35; Swiss Albums – #69	—N/a	
Warren Stacey	"My Girl, My Girl"	Single	March 11, 2002	Mercury Records UK	—N/a	UK singles chart – #26	—N/a	
R. Kelly and Jay-Z	The Best of Both Worlds	Album	March 19, 2002	Rockland Records; Jive Records	"Honey"; "Get This Money"; "Take You Home with Me" (a.k.a. Body)	ARIA Charts – #100; Ö3 Austria Top 40 – #73; Ultratop Belgian Albums (Wallonia) – #37; Canadian Albums – #19; Dutch Album Top 100 – #12; French Albums – #20; German Albums – #22; Sverigetopplistan – #42; Swiss Albums – #18; UK Albums Chart – #37; Billboard 200 – #2; Billboard Urban Albums – #1	SNEP – Gold; RIAA – Platinum	
Ashanti	Ashanti	Album	April 3, 2002	AJM Records, LLC.	"Foolish"; "Happy"; "Baby"	ARIA Charts – #10; Ö3 Austria Top 40 – #36; Ultratop Belgian Albums (Flanders) – #24; Ultratop Belgian Albums (Wallonia) – #29; Canadian Albums – #5; Dutch Album Top 100 – #12; French Albums – #29; German Albums – #10; New Zealand Albums – #15; Swiss Albums – #15; UK Albums Chart – #3; UK R&B Albums – #1; Billboard 200 – #1; Billboard Urban Albums – #1	RIAA – 3× Platinum; ARIA – Gold; BPI – Platinum; MC – 2× Platinum; RIAJ – Platinum; IFPI (Switzerland) – Gold	
3rd Storee	Get with Me	Album	April 16, 2002	Edmonds Record Group	"Get with Me"	Billboard 200 – #45	—N/a	
Musiq	Juslisen (Just Listen)	Album	May 7, 2002	Mama's Boys Music	"Halfcrazy"; "Dontchange"; "Previouscats" (street single)	Canadian Albums – #7; UK Albums Chart – #97; Billboard 200 – #1; Billboard Urban Albums – #1	RIAA – Platinum	
Cam'ron	Come Home with Me	Album	May 14, 2002	Diplomat Records	"Hey Ma"; "Oh Boy"; "Daydreaming"	French Albums – #49; UK Albums Chart – #87; Billboard 200 – #2; Billboard Urban Albums – #1	RIAA – Platinum; BPI – Silver	
N.O.R.E.	God's Favorite	Album	June 25, 2002	Thugged Out Entertainment; Violator	"Nothin'"; "Grimey"	Canadian Albums – #46; UK Albums Chart – #152; Billboard 200 – #3; Billboard Urban Albums – #3	RIAA – Gold	
Various artists	Irv Gotti Presents: The Inc.	Compilation	July 2, 2002	—N/a	"Ain't It Funny (Murder Remix)"; "Down 4 U"; "Ride Wit Us"	Canadian Albums – #23; UK Albums Chart – #68; UK R&B Albums – #9; Billboard 200 – #3; Billboard Urban Albums – #2	RIAA – Gold	
Scarface	The Fix	Album	August 6, 2002	Skinny Gangster Music Group; J. Prince Entertainment; Rap-A-Lot Records	"My Block"; "Someday"; "Guess Who's Back"	Billboard 200 – #4; Billboard Urban Albums – #1	—N/a	
Ludacris Presents Disturbing tha Peace	Golden Grain	Compilation	September 10, 2002	—N/a	"Growing Pains (Do It Again)"	Billboard 200 – #6; Billboard Urban Albums – #1	RIAA – Gold	
LL Cool J	10	Album	October 15, 2002	—N/a	"Luv U Better"; "Paradise"; "Amazin'"	Dutch Album Top 100 – #100; French Albums – #106; German Albums – #64; Swiss Albums – #19; UK Albums Chart – #26; Billboard 200 – #2; Billboard Urban Albums – #1	RIAA – Gold; BPI – Silver	
Various artists	Paid in Full/Dream Team	Album	October 25, 2002	—N/a	"Champions"	Billboard 200 – #53; Billboard Urban Albums – #10; Billboard Soundtrack Albums – #2	—N/a	
Various artists	Irv Gotti Presents: The Remixes	Remix album	November 5, 2002	—N/a	"The Pledge" (Remix)	Billboard 200 – #24; Billboard Urban Albums – #5	—N/a	
WC	Ghetto Heisman	Album	November 12, 2002	KWL Entertainment	"The Streets"	Billboard 200 – #46; Billboard Urban Albums – #7	—N/a	
Jay-Z	The Blueprint 2: The Gift & The Curse	Double album	November 12, 2002	—N/a	"Hovi Baby"; "Excuse Me Miss"; "'03 Bonnie & Clyde"	Canadian Albums – #8; Dutch Album Top 100 – #66; French Albums – #79; German Albums – #61; New Zealand Albums – #49; Swiss Albums – #52; UK Albums – #23; Billboard 200 – #1; Billboard Urban Albums – #1	RIAA – 3× Platinum; BPI – Gold; MC – 2× Platinum	
Ja Rule	The Last Temptation	Album	November 19, 2002	—N/a	"Thug Lovin'"; "Mesmerize"; "The Pledge" (Remix)	ARIA Charts – #29; Canadian Albums – #9; German Albums – #50; Irish Albums Chart – #30; New Zealand Albums – #11; Swiss Albums – #27; UK Albums – #14; Billboard 200 – #4; Billboard Urban Albums – #2	RIAA – Platinum; MC – Platinum; BPI – Gold; ARIA – Gold	
Dru Hill	Dru World Order	Album	November 26, 2002	Dragon Records, LLC.	"I Should Be..."; "I Love You"; "No Doubt"	Billboard 200 – #21; Billboard Urban Albums – #2	RIAA – Gold	
Various artists	The Source Presents: Hip Hop Hits, Vol. 6	Compilation	December 10, 2002	The Source	—N/a	Billboard 200 – #35; Billboard Urban Albums – #31	—N/a	
Various artists	Red Star Sounds Vol. 2: B-Sides	Compilation	c. 2002	Red Star Sounds; The Heineken Music Initiative	"Stylin'" (Remix)	—N/a		
Various artists	The Big Picture	Compilation	c. 2002	—N/a				(Note: Promotional release; not an official shipment.)
Various artists	The Lick: Best of... Presented by Trevor Nelson	Compilation	c. 2002	BBC Radio 1Xtra	—N/a			
Various artists	rap.de Allstars #02	Compilation	c. 2002	—N/a				
Danacee	Spotlight	Album	c. 2002	—N/a				
Pyranja	Egal Was Ihr Sagt	Album	c. 2002	—N/a				
S-Word	One Piece	Album	c. 2002	—N/a				
Dabo	Hitman	Album	c. 2002	—N/a				
Sphere of Influence	The Influence	Album	c. 2002	—N/a				
Various artists	DJ Masterkey presents Def Jam 2002	Album	c. 2002	—N/a				
Doberman Inc.	Dobermann	Album	c. 2002	—N/a				

=== 2003 ===
Artist(s)	Title	Type	Release date	Label(s) released in association with	Singles	Chart positions	Certifications	Refs.
Various artists	Cradle 2 the Grave soundtrack	Album	February 18, 2003	Bloodline Records	"X Gon' Give It to Ya"	French Albums – #61; German Albums – #39; Swiss Albums Chart – #75; Billboard 200 – #6; Billboard Soundtrack Albums – #1; Billboard Urban Albums – #3	RIAA – Gold	
Freeway	Philadelphia Freeway	Album	February 25, 2003	Criminal Background Records	"What We Do"; "Alright"; "Flipside"	Billboard 200 – #5; Billboard Urban Albums – #3	RIAA – Gold	
Terri Walker	Untitled	Album	3 March 2003	Mercury Records UK	"Guess You Didn't Love Me"; "Ching Ching (Lovin' You Still)"; "Drawing Board"	UK Albums Chart – #118	BPI – Gold	
The Diplomats	Diplomatic Immunity	Album	March 11, 2003	Diplomat Records	"I Really Mean It"; "Dipset Anthem"	Billboard 200 – #8; Billboard Urban Albums – #1	RIAA – Gold	
Jay-Z	The Blueprint 2.1 (Note: Blueprint 2.1 (2003) was a single disc reissue of The Blueprint 2: The Gift and the Curse (2002). Some outlets however deem this album either a studio album or a compilation which is possibly incorrect.)	Reissue	April 8, 2003	—N/a	"La-La-La (Excuse Me Miss Again)" (Note: "La-La-La (Excuse Me Miss Again)" was included on Blueprint 2.1 as a hidden bonus track and instead released as an official single for the Bad Boys II soundtrack, released in July 2003.)	Billboard 200 – #50; Billboard Urban Albums – #11	RIAA – Gold	
Kelly Price	Priceless	Album	April 29, 2003	—N/a	"Take It to the Head"; "You Make Me Feel"; "He Proposed"	Billboard 200 – #10; Billboard Urban Albums – #2	—N/a	
Ashanti	7 Series Sampler: Ashanti	EP	May 20, 2003	—N/a		Billboard 200 – #142	—N/a	
Various artists	2 Fast 2 Furious soundtrack	Album	May 27, 2003	UMG Soundtracks	"Act a Fool"; "Pick Up the Phone"; "Pump It Up"; "Hell Yeah"	ARIA Charts – #25; Ö3 Austria Top 40 – #22; Ultratop Belgian Albums (Wallonia) – #50; Canadian Albums – #10; French Albums – #57; German Albums – #11; New Zealand Albums – #18; Swiss Albums – #26; Billboard 200 – #5; Billboard Urban Albums – #1; Billboard Soundtrack Albums – #1	RIAA – Gold; MC – Gold	
Joe Budden	Joe Budden	Album	June 10, 2003	Desert Storm Records; On Top Records	"Pump It Up"; "Focus"; "Fire (Yes, Yes Y'all)"	UK Albums Chart – #55; Billboard 200 – #8; Billboard Urban Albums – #2	RIAA – Gold	
Ashanti	Chapter II	Album	July 1, 2003	AJM Records, LLC.	"Rock wit U (Awww Baby)"; "Rain on Me"; "Breakup 2 Makeup"	ARIA Charts – #19; Ö3 Austria Top 40 – #65; Canadian Albums – #5; Dutch Album Top 100 – #26; French Albums – #62; German Albums – #12; New Zealand Albums – #22; Swiss Albums – #9; UK Albums Chart – #5; Billboard 200 – #1; Billboard Urban Albums – #1	RIAA – 2× Platinum; MC – Platinum; BPI – Gold; RIAJ – Gold	
Keith Murray	He's Keith Murray	Album	July 15, 2003	Def Squad	"Yeah Yeah U Know It"	Billboard 200 – #40; Billboard Urban Albums – #11	—N/a	
Ai	Original Ai	Album	July 23, 2003	—N/a	"Last Words"; "Thank U"; "My Friend"; "Merry Christmas Mr. Lawrence"	Japanese Albums Chart – #15	—N/a	
State Property	The Chain Gang Vol. 2	Album	August 12, 2003	Criminal Background Records	"Can't Stop, Won't Stop"; "When You Hear That"	Billboard 200 – #6; Billboard Urban Albums – #1	—N/a	
Juelz Santana	From Me to U	Album	August 19, 2003	Diplomat Records	"Dipset (Santana's Town)"	Billboard 200 – #8; Billboard Urban Albums – #3	RIAA – Gold	
DMX	Grand Champ	Album	September 16, 2003	Ruff Ryders Entertainment	"Where the Hood At?"; "Get It on the Floor"	ARIA Charts – #32; Ö3 Austria Top 40 – #20; Ultratop Belgian Flanders (Flanders) – #38; Canadian Albums – #2; Dutch Album Top 100 – #28; French Albums – #16; German Albums – #6; New Zealand Albums – #7; Sverigetopplistan – #42; Swiss Albums – #10; UK Albums Chart – #6; Billboard 200 – #1; Billboard Urban Albums – #1	RIAA – Platinum; MC – Platinum; BPI – Gold	(Note: With Grand Champ (2003), DMX is the only artist in Billboard 200 history to have its first five consecutive number-one albums.)
Ludacris	Chicken-n-Beer	Album	October 7, 2003	—N/a	"Stand Up"; "P-Poppin"; "Blow It Out"; "Diamond in the Back"; "Splash Waterfalls"	ARIA Charts – #98; Canadian Albums – #5; German Albums – #87; Irish Albums Chart – #71; UK Albums Chart – #44; Billboard 200 – #1; Billboard Urban Albums – #1	RIAA – 2× Platinum; MC – Platinum; BPI – Gold	
Various artists	Red Star Sounds Presents Def Jamaica	Compilation	October 14, 2003	Red Star Sounds; The Heineken Music Initiative; Tuff Gong Records	"Frontin'" (Dancehall Remix); "Anything Goes"; "Dude" (Remix)	—N/a		
Ja Rule	Blood in My Eye	Album	November 4, 2003	—N/a	"Clap Back"	ARIA Charts – #79; German Albums – #98; Swiss Albums – #92; UK Albums Chart – #51; Billboard 200 – #6; Billboard Urban Albums – #1	—N/a	
Jay-Z	The Black Album	Album	November 14, 2003	—N/a	"Change Clothes"; "Dirt off Your Shoulder"; "99 Problems"; "Encore"	Ultratop Belgian Albums (Flanders) – #97; Canadian Albums – #12; Dutch Album Top 100 – #66; French Albums – #66; German Albums – #47; Norwegian Top 40 Albums – #18; Sverigetopplistan – #41; Swiss Albums Chart – #29; UK Albums Chart – #29; UK R&B Albums – #2; Billboard 200 – #1; Billboard Urban Albums – #1	RIAA – 3× Platinum; MC – Platinum; BPI – Platinum	
Ashanti	Ashanti's Christmas	Album	November 21, 2003	—N/a		Billboard 200 – #160; Billboard Urban Albums – #43; Billboard Top Holiday Albums – #13	—N/a	
112	Hot & Wet	Album	December 9, 2003	Bad Boy Records	"Na Na Na Na"; "Hot & Wet"; "Give It to Me"; "Right Here for U"	Billboard 200 – #22; Billboard Urban Albums – #4	RIAA – Gold	
Musiq	Soulstar	Album	December 9, 2003	Mama's Boys Music	"Forthenight"; "Whoknows"; "missyou"	Billboard 200 – #13; Billboard Urban Albums – #3	RIAA – Gold	
Various artists	The Source Presents: Hip Hop Hits, Vol. 7	Compilation	December 9, 2003	The Source	—N/a	Billboard 200 – #86; Billboard Urban Albums – #49	—N/a	
Memphis Bleek	M.A.D.E.	Album	December 16, 2003	Get Low Records	"Everything's a Go"; "Round Here"	Billboard 200 – #35; Billboard Urban Albums – #5	—N/a	
Various artists	Music Inspired by Scarface	Compilation	c. 2003	UMG Soundtracks	—N/a			
Various artists	Def Jam Vendetta soundtrack	Album	c. 2003	—N/a	"StompDaSh*tOutU"; "It's My Turn (Fight!)"; "Stick 'Em"	—N/a		
Various artists	Santa's Sack	Compilation	c. 2003	Mercury Records UK; Vertigo Records; Fontana Records	—N/a			
Fatman Scoop	Party Breaks	Compilation	c. 2003	—N/a	"Be Faithful"	—N/a		
Panjabi Hit Squad	Desi Beats, Vol. 1	Compilation	c. 2003	—N/a	"Hai Hai Remix"; "Mittran De"; "Fantasy"; "Shere Panjabi"	—N/a		
Various artists	Westwood: Platinum Edition	Compilation	c. 2003	—N/a				
Various artists	Kiss XXX Hip Hop	Compilation	c. 2003	Universal Music TV	—N/a			
DJ Kaori	DJ Kaori's Def Jam Mix	Compilation	c. 2003	—N/a				
S-Word	Star III Warz	Album	c. 2003	—N/a				
Sphere of Influence	Atlantis	Album	c. 2003	—N/a				
Hi-D	Word of Majesty	Album	c. 2003	—N/a				
Beezel	"See About Ya"	Single	c. 2003	—N/a				
Deutsch Amerikanische Freundschaft	Fünfzehn neue D.A.F.-Lieder	Album	c. 2003	Superstar Records	—N/a	German Albums – #95	—N/a	
Düse	"Nackig"	Maxi single	c. 2003	—N/a				
Various artists	The Roc Files, Vol. 1	Compilation	c. 2003	—N/a				

=== 2004 ===
Artist(s)	Title	Type	Release date	Label(s) released in association with	Singles	Chart positions	Certifications	Refs.
Tokona-X	トウカイXテイオー	Album	January 28, 2004	—N/a				
Kanye West	The College Dropout	Album	February 10, 2004	Hip Hop Since 1978; The Heavy Hitters; Hustle	"Through the Wire"; "All Falls Down"; "Jesus Walks"; "Spaceship"; "Slow Jamz"; "The New Workout Plan"	Canadian Albums – #38; French Albums – #98; German Albums – #77; Norwegian Top 40 Albums – #27; Dutch Album Top 100 – #53; Irish Albums Chart – #13; Sveriegetopplistan – #39; Swiss Albums – #96; UK Albums Chart – #12; UK R&B Albums – #2; Billboard 200 – #2; Billboard Urban Albums – #1	RIAA – 4× Platinum; MC – Platinum; BPI – 2× Platinum; RMNZ – Gold; IFPI (Denmark) – Platinum	
Young Gunz	Tough Luv	Album	February 24, 2004	—N/a	"No Better Love"; "Friday Night"	Billboard 200 – #3; Billboard Urban Albums – #1	RIAA – Gold	
Various artists	Johnson Family Vacation soundtrack	Album	April 6, 2004	Mama's Boys Music; UMG Soundtracks	"Shoulda Known Betta"; "Freedom"	—N/a		
Ghostface	The Pretty Toney Album	Album	April 20, 2004	Starks Enterprises, LLC.	"Tush"; "Run"	Billboard 200 – #6; Billboard Urban Albums – #4	—N/a	
Patti LaBelle	Timeless Journey	Album	May 4, 2004	—N/a	"New Day"	Billboard 200 – #18; Billboard Urban Albums – #5	RIAA – Gold	(Note: Released under the short-lived Def Soul Classics subsidiary.)
Method Man	Tical 0: The Prequel	Album	May 18, 2004	—N/a	"What's Happenin'"; "The Show"	Canadian Albums – #3; UK Albums Chart – #29; Billboard 200 – #2; Billboard Urban Albums – #1	RIAA – Gold	
Christina Milian	It's About Time	Album	June 15, 2004 (Note: It's About Time was released in Europe and Japan on June 15, 2004, a month before the American release date.)	—N/a	"Dip It Low"; "Whatever U Want"	Dutch Album Top 100 – #66; French Albums – #83; German Albums – #55; Irish Albums – #74; Swiss Albums – #35; UK Albums Chart – #21; Billboard 200 – #14; Billboard Urban Albums – #5	BPI – Silver; RIAJ – Gold	(Note: Despite It's About Time (2004) and So Amazin (2006) being released under sister label Island Records, Christina Milian's previous contractual obligations with Def Jam's Def Soul division pushed Universal Music to release both albums in European markets under Def Jam.)
Ai	2004 Ai	Album	June 16, 2004	—N/a	"After the Rain"; "EO"; "Watch Out!"	Japanese Albums Chart – #3	RIAJ – Gold	
Lloyd	Southside	Album	July 20, 2004	—N/a	"Southside"; "Hey Young Girl"	Billboard 200 – #11; Billboard Urban Albums – #3	—N/a	(Note: Released under Murder Inc. Records (when it was known at the time as The Inc.))
Shyne	Godfather Buried Alive	Album	August 10, 2004	Gangland Record, Corp.	"More or Less"; "Jimmy Choo"	Billboard 200 – #3; Billboard Urban Albums – #1	RIAA – Gold	
LL Cool J	The DEFinition	Album	August 31, 2004	—N/a	"Headsprung"; "Hush"	Canadian Albums – #23; Ultratop Belgian Albums (Flanders) – #90; French Albums – #136; German Albums – #50; Swiss Albums – #35; UK Albums Chart – #66; Billboard 200 – #4; Billboard Urban Albums – #3	RIAA – Gold	
Hi-D	Great Second	Album	September 8, 2004	—N/a	—N/a			
Shawnna	Worth tha Weight	Album	September 28, 2004	—N/a	"R.P.M."; "Shake Dat Shit"; "Weight a Minute"	Billboard 200 – #22; Billboard Urban Albums – #5	RIAA – Gold	
R. Kelly and Jay-Z	Unfinished Business	Album	October 26, 2004	Rockland Records; Jive Records	"Big Chips"	Canadian Albums – #14; Dutch Album Top 100 – #60; French Albums – #68; German Albums – #77; Swiss Albums – #65; UK Albums Chart – #61; Billboard 200 – #1; Billboard Urban Albums – #1	RIAA – Platinum	
Ja Rule	R.U.L.E.	Album	November 9, 2004	—N/a	"Wonderful"; "New York"; "Caught Up"	German Albums – #44; Irish Albums Chart – #67; Swiss Albums – #50; UK Albums Chart – #33; Billboard 200 – #7; Billboard Urban Albums – #3	RIAA – Gold; BPI – Silver	
Jay-Z and Linkin Park	Collision Course	EP / video album	November 30, 2004	Machine Shop Recordings; Warner Bros.; (Note: Collision Course (2004) was distributed by Warner Records (known as Warner Bros. Records at the time), due to Linkin Park's contractual negotiations, preventing Def Jam/UMG from distributing this project.)	"Numb/Encore"	ARIA Charts – #8; Ö3 Austria Top 40 – #5; Ultratop Belgian Albums (Flanders) – #19; Ultratop Belgian Albums (Wallonia) – #17; Canadian Albums – #6; Danish Albums – #7; Dutch Album Top 100 – #9; French Albums – #20; German Albums – #5; Irish Albums – #6; Italian Albums – #19; New Zealand Albums Chart – #4; Norwegian Top 40 Albums – #1; Scottish Albums – #18; Sverigetopplistan – #9; Swiss Albums – #2; UK Albums Chart – #15; UK R&B Albums – #2; Billboard 200 – #1; Billboard Urban Albums – #3	RIAA – 2× Platinum; MC – 2× Platinum; BPI – Platinum; ARIA – Platinum; IFPI (Austria) – Gold; IFPI (Denmark) – Gold; SNEP – Gold; BVMI – Platinum; IRMA – 2× Platinum; RIAJ – Gold; RMNZ – Platinum; AFP – Gold; IFPI (Switzerland) – Platinum	
Ludacris	The Red Light District	Album	December 7, 2004	—N/a	"Number One Spot"; "Get Back"; "The Potion"; "Pimpin' All Over the World"; "Blueberry Yum Yum"	ARIA Charts – #54; Canadian Albums – #8; Swiss Albums – #91; UK Albums Chart – #8; Billboard 200 – #1; Billboard Urban Albums – #1	RIAA – 2× Platinum; MC – Gold; BPI – Silver	
Cam'ron	Purple Haze	Album	December 7, 2004	Diplomat Records	"Get Em Girls"; "Shake"; "Hey Lady"; "Girls"; "Down and Out"	UK Albums Chart – #160; Billboard 200 – #20; Billboard Urban Albums – #4	RIAA – Gold	
Ashanti	Concrete Rose	Album	December 14, 2004	—N/a	"Only U"; "Don't Let Them"	Dutch Album Top 100 – #73; French Albums – #98; German Albums – #36; Swiss Albums – #66; UK Albums – #25; Billboard 200 – #7; Billboard Urban Albums – #2	RIAA – Gold; BPI – Gold; RIAJ – Gold	
Various artists	Westwood: The Takeover	Compilation	c. 2004	—N/a				
Various artists	Westwood: The Jump Off	Compilation	c. 2004	—N/a				
Various artists	Westwood: The Big Dawg	Compilation	c. 2004	—N/a				
Various artists	Hip Hop Bible	Compilation	c. 2004	—N/a				
Various artists	Rhythm & Babe	Compilation	c. 2004	—N/a				
Taz	Analyse This	Album	c. 2004	—N/a				
Various artists	Kiss XXX Hip Hop 2	Compilation	c. 2004	Universal Music TV	—N/a			
FYA	"Too Hot / Must Be Love"	Single	c. 2004	Jamdown	—N/a			
Yasuyuki Okamura	Me-imi	Album	c. 2004	—N/a				
Goin' Through	La Sagrada Familia	Album	c. 2004	Family the Label; Universal Music Greece	—N/a			
Comp	"Harder"	Single	c. 2004	Chocolate City Music	—N/a			

=== 2005 ===
Artist(s)	Title	Type	Release date	Label(s) released in association with	Singles	Chart positions	Certifications	Refs.
Kanye West	The College Dropout Video Anthology	Video album	March 22, 2005	—N/a			RIAA – Gold	
112	Pleasure & Pain	Album	March 29, 2005	—N/a	"U Already Know"; "What If"	French Albums – #118; Billboard 200 – #4; Billboard Urban Albums – #2	RIAA – Gold	
Beanie Sigel	The B. Coming	Album	March 29, 2005	Criminal Background Records; Dame Dash Music Group	"Gotta Have It"; "Feel It In the Air"; "Don't Stop"	Billboard 200 – #3; Billboard Urban Albums – #1	—N/a	
Mariah Carey	The Emancipation of Mimi	Album	April 12, 2005	—N/a	"It's Like That"; "Shake It Off"; "We Belong Together"; "Get Your Number"; "Don't Forget About Us" (Ultra Platinum edition); "Say Somethin'"	ARIA Charts – #6; Ö3 Austria Top 40 – #19; Ultratop Belgian Albums (Flanders) – #31; Ultratop Belgian Albums (Wallonia) – #26; Canadian Albums – #2; Danish Albums – #2; Dutch Album Top 100 – #8; French Albums – #4; German Albums – #14; Irish Albums – #18; Italian Albums – #15; Japanese Albums – #2; New Zealand Albums Chart – #12; Polish Albums – #22; Portuguese Albums – #25; Scottish Albums – #31; Spanish Albums – #15; Sverigetopplistan – #32; Swiss Albums – #9; UK Albums Chart – #7; UK R&B Albums – #2; Billboard 200 – #1; Billboard Urban Albums – #1	RIAA – 6× Platinum; BPI – 2× Platinum; RMNZ – Platinum; SNEP – Gold; RIAJ – Platinum; ARIA – Platinum; Pro-Música Brasil – Gold; MC – 3× Platinum; IFPI (Europe) – Platinum	(Note: Like Christina Milian, although Mariah Carey was a signed Island recording artist at the time of the releases of The Emancipation of Mimi (2005) and E=MC² (2008), Def Jam released those albums in the United Kingdom under license to Mercury, due to its association through IDJMG.)
Bobby V	Bobby Valentino	Album	April 26, 2005	—N/a	"Slow Down"; "Tell Me"; "My Angel (Never Leave You)"	French Albums – #74; German Albums – #87; UK Albums Chart – #34; Billboard 200 – #3; Billboard Urban Albums – #1	BPI – Gold; RIAA – Gold	
Memphis Bleek	534	Album	May 17, 2005	Get Low Records	"Like That"; "Dear Summer"	Billboard 200 – #11; Billboard Urban Albums – #3	—N/a	
Young Gunz	Brothers from Another	Album	May 24, 2005	—N/a	"Set It Off"	Billboard 200 – #15; Billboard Urban Albums – #4	—N/a	
Various artists	#1 Spot	Compilation	June 14, 2005	—N/a	—N/a	Billboard 200 – #164	—N/a	
Patti LaBelle	Classic Moments	Album	June 21, 2005	—N/a	"Ain't No Way"	Billboard 200 – #24; Billboard Urban Albums – #5	—N/a	
Young Jeezy	Let's Get It: Thug Motivation 101	Album	July 26, 2005	Corporate Thugz Entertainment	"And Then What"; "Soul Survivor"; "Go Crazy"; "My Hood"	Billboard 200 – #2; Billboard Urban Albums – #1	RIAA – 2× Platinum	
Public Enemy	Power to the People and the Beats: Public Enemy's Greatest Hits	Greatest hits album	August 2, 2005	—N/a		Billboard 200 – #69; Billboard Urban Albums – #26	—N/a	
Teairra Marí	Roc-A-Fella Records Presents Teairra Marí	Album	August 2, 2005	Music Line Entertainment; K.I.S.S. Productions	"Make Her Feel Good"; "No Daddy"; "Phone Booth"	Billboard 200 – #5; Billboard Urban Albums – #2	—N/a	
Kanye West	Late Registration	Album	August 30, 2005	Hip Hop Since 1978; The Heavy Hitters; Hustle	"Diamonds from Sierra Leone"; "Gold Digger"; "Heard 'Em Say"; "Touch the Sky"; "Drive Slow"	ARIA Charts – #14; Ö3 Austria Top 40 – #53; Ultratop Belgian Albums (Flanders) – #43; Canadian Albums – #1; Danish Albums – #11; Dutch Album Top 100 – #24; Finnish Albums – #18; French Albums – #36; German Albums – #14; Greek Albums – #7; Irish Albums Chart – #2; Italian Albums Chart – #75; Japanese Albums Chart – #10; New Zealand Albums Chart – #11; Norwegian Albums – #4; Scottish Albums – #3; Sverigetopplistan – #11; Swiss Albums Chart –#9; UK Albums Chart – #2; UK R&B Albums – #1; Billboard 200 – #1; Billboard Urban Albums – #1	RIAA – 4× Platinum; MC – 2× Platinum; BPI – 3× Platinum; ARIA – Platinum; RMNZ – Platinum; IRMA – 2× Platinum; RIAJ – Gold; IFPI (Denmark) – Platinum; IFPI (Europe) – Platinum	
Rihanna	Music of the Sun	Album	August 30, 2005	SRP Records	"Pon de Replay"; "If It's Lovin' that You Want"	ARIA Charts – #18; Ö3 Austria Top 40 – #45; Canadian Albums – #7; Dutch Album Top 100 – #98; French Albums – #93; German Albums – #31; New Zealand Albums – #26; Swiss Albums – #38; UK Albums Chart – #35; Billboard 200 – #10; Billboard Urban Albums – #6	RIAA – Platinum; BPI – Gold; MC – Platinum; RMNZ – Gold; BVMI – Gold; RIAJ – Gold	
Dru Hill	Hits	Greatest hits album	October 11, 2005	—N/a		Billboard 200 – #72; Billboard Urban Albums – #22	—N/a	(Note: Released in association with sister label Island Records, as part of a relationship through the Island Def Jam Music Group.)
Rev Run	Distortion	Album	October 18, 2005	Russell Simmons Music Group	"Mind of the Road"	Billboard Urban Albums – #78	—N/a	
Teriyaki Boyz	Beef or Chicken	Album	November 16, 2005	(B)ape Sounds; Universal Music Japan	"HeartBreaker"	Japanese Albums Chart – #4	RIAJ – Gold	
Juelz Santana	What the Game's Been Missing!	Album	November 22, 2005	Diplomat Records	"Mic Check"; "There It Go (The Whistle Song)"; "Oh Yes"; "Clockwork"	Billboard 200 – #9; Billboard Urban Albums – #1	RIAA – Gold	
Ashanti	Collectables by Ashanti	Remix album	December 6, 2005	—N/a	"Still on It"	Billboard 200 – #59; Billboard Urban Albums – #10	—N/a	(Note: Collectibles (2005) by Ashanti as well as Ja Rule's Exodus were the final two albums released under a partnership with Murder Inc. Records as the label was later dropped from Def Jam as consequence for a January 2003 federal raid and investigation involving illicit profits and money laundering.)
Ja Rule	Exodus	Greatest hits album	December 6, 2005	—N/a	—N/a	UK Albums Chart –#50; Billboard 200 – #107; Billboard Urban Albums – #23	BPI – Silver	(Note: Collectibles (2005) by Ashanti as well as Ja Rule's Exodus were the final two albums released under a partnership with Murder Inc. Records as the label was later dropped from Def Jam as consequence for a January 2003 federal raid and investigation involving illicit profits and money laundering.)
Various artists	Ludacris Presents Disturbing tha Peace	Compilation	December 13, 2005	—N/a	"Georgia"; "Gettin' Some"; "Two Miles an Hour" (Remix)	Billboard 200 – #11; Billboard Urban Albums – #1	RIAA – Gold	
Various artists	Westwood: The Invasion	Compilation	c. 2005	—N/a				
Various artists	Westwood: The Heat	Compilation	c. 2005	—N/a				
Various artists	Westwood, Vol. X	Compilation	c. 2005	—N/a				
Various artists	Westwood: The Greatest Hip Hop of 2005 (Raw)	Compilation	c. 2005	—N/a				
DMX	"Give 'Em What They Want"	Single / B-side	c. 2005	Ruff Ryders Entertainment	—N/a			
DMX	"Pump Ya Fist"	Single / B-side	c. 2005	Ruff Ryders Entertainment	—N/a			
Yasuyuki Okamura	ビジネス	Mini-LP	c. 2005	—N/a				

=== 2006 ===
Artist(s)	Title	Type	Release date	Label(s) released in association with	Singles	Chart positions	Certifications	Refs.
Ne-Yo	In My Own Words	Album	February 28, 2006	Compound Entertainment	"So Sick"; "Stay"; "When You're Mad"; "Sexy Love"	ARIA Charts – #41; Ӧ3 Austria Top 40 – #63; Ultratop Belgian Albums (Flanders) – #83; Canadian Albums – #9; Dutch Album Top 100 – #50; French Albums – #20; German Albums – #27; New Zealand Albums Chart – #35; Swiss Albums – #11; UK Albums Chart – #14; UK R&B Albums – #1; Billboard 200 – #1; Billboard Urban Albums – #1	RIAA – 2× Platinum; BPI – Platinum; ARIA – Platinum; Pro-Música Brasil – Gold; RIAJ – Platinum	
Ghostface Killah	Fishscale	Album	March 28, 2006	Starks Enterprises, LLC.	"Be Easy"; "Back Like That"	Norwegian Albums – #37; Swiss Albums – #66; UK Albums Chart – #174; Billboard 200 – #4; Billboard Urban Albums – #2	—N/a	
Christina Milian	So Amazin'	Album	April 19, 2006	—N/a	"Say I"	French Albums – #139; Swiss Albums Chart – #55; UK Albums Chart – #67; UK R&B Albums – #7; Billboard 200 – #11; Billboard Urban Albums – #3	—N/a	
LL Cool J	Todd Smith	Album	April 11, 2006	—N/a	"It's LL and Santana"; "Control Myself"; "Freeze"	Ultratop Belgian Albums (Flanders) – #88; Dutch Album Top 100 – #99; Swiss Albums – #64; UK Albums Chart – #76; Billboard 200 – #6; Billboard Urban Albums – #2	RIAA – Gold	
Rihanna	A Girl like Me	Album	April 11, 2006	SRP Records	"SOS"; "Unfaithful"; "We Ride"; "Break It Off"	ARIA Charts – #9; Ö3 Austria Top 40 – #21; Ultratop Belgian Albums (Flanders) – #10; Ultratop Belgian Albums (Wallonia) – #21; Canadian Albums – #1; Danish Albums – #19; Dutch Album Top 100 – #14; Finnish Albums – #30; French Albums – #18; German Albums – #13; Hungarian Albums Chart – #3; Irish Albums Chart – #5; Italian Albums – #36; Japanese Albums – #4; New Zealand Albums Chart – #7; Norwegian Albums Chart – #28; Portuguese Albums – #13; Scottish Albums – #8; Spanish Albums – #81; Sverigetopplistan – #29; Swiss Albums Chart – #6; UK Albums Chart – #5; UK R&B Albums – #1; Billboard 200 – #5; Billboard Urban Albums – #2	RIAA – 2× Platinum; MC – 2× Platinum; BPI – 2× Platinum; ARIA – Platinum; RIAJ – Gold; RMNZ – Platinum; BEA – Gold; BVMI – Platinum; MAHASZ – Gold; IRMA – 2× Platinum; ZPAV – Gold; IFPI (Switzerland) – Platinum; IFPI (Europe) – Platinum	
Kanye West	Late Orchestration	Album	April 24, 2006	Mercury Records UK	—N/a	Irish Albums Chart – #46; UK Albums Chart – #59	—N/a	
The Isley Brothers (featuring Ronald Isley)	Baby Makin' Music	Album	May 9, 2006	—N/a	"You Helped Me Write This Song"; "Just Came Here to Chill"; "Blast Off"; "Heaven Hooked Us Up"; "You're My Star"	Billboard 200 – #5; Billboard Urban Albums – #1	—N/a	
Various artists	Waist Deep soundtrack	Album	June 13, 2006	Russell Simmons Music Group	"Bad Girl"	Billboard Soundtrack Albums – #10; Billboard Urban Albums – #42	—N/a	
Shawnna	Block Music	Album	June 27, 2006	Hustle	"Gettin' Some"	Billboard 200 – #13; Billboard Urban Albums – #3	—N/a	
Héctor "El Father"	Los Rompe Discotekas	Compilation	June 27, 2006	Machete Music; Gold Star; VI Music	"Here We Go Yo"; "Yomo Dele"; "El Telefono"	Billboard 200 – #31; Billboard Compilation Albums – #2; Billboard Latin Albums – #1	—N/a	(Note: Released under Roc-A-Fella's short-lived Roc-La-Familia branch.)
Rick Ross	Port of Miami	Album	August 8, 2006	Slip-N-Slide Records; Poe Boy Entertainment	"Hustlin'"; "Push It"	Billboard 200 – #1; Billboard Urban Albums – #1	RIAA – Platinum	
The Roots	Game Theory	Album	August 29, 2006	—N/a	"Don't Feel Right"; "Here I Come"; "In The Music"	Dutch Album Top 100 – #78; Finnish Albums Chart – #36; French Albums – #69; German Albums Chart – #95; Norwegian Albums – #26; Swiss Albums Chart – #7; UK Albums Chart – #76; Billboard 200 – #9; Billboard Urban Albums – #5	—N/a	
Method Man	4:21... The Day After	Album	August 29, 2006	—N/a	"Say"	UK Albums Chart – #80; Billboard 200 – #8; Billboard Urban Albums – #4	—N/a	
Lionel Richie	Coming Home	Album	September 12, 2006	—N/a	"I Call It Love"; "Why"	Ö3 Austria Top 40 – #35; Ultratop Belgian Albums (Wallonia) – #47; Dutch Album Top 100 – #20; French Albums – #17; German Albums Chart – #8; Italian Albums – #26; Swiss Albums Chart – #9; UK Albums Chart – #15; Billboard 200 – #6; Billboard Urban Albums – #3	RIAA – Gold; BPI – Gold	
N.O.R.E.	N.O.R.E. y la Familia...Ya Tú Sabe	Album	September 12, 2006	Thugged Out Entertainment; Black Wall Productions; Violator	"Mas Maiz"	Billboard 200 – #82; Billboard Latin Albums – #2		
Ludacris	Release Therapy	Album	September 26, 2006	—N/a	"Money Maker"; "Runaway Love"; "Grew Up a Screw Up"; "Slap"; "Girls Gone Wild"	Swiss Albums Chart – #57; UK Albums Chart – #69; Billboard 200 – #1; Billboard Urban Albums – #2	RIAA – Gold	
Shareefa	Point of No Return	Album	October 24, 2006	—N/a	"Need a Boss"	Billboard 200 – #25; Billboard Urban Albums – #3		
Lady Sovereign	Public Warning	Album	Halloween 2006 (31 October)	—N/a	"Random"; "9 to 5"; "Hoodie"; "Love Me or Hate Me (Fuck You!!!!)"; "Those Were the Days"	ARIA Charts – #97; Japanese Albums Chart – #22; UK Albums Chart – #58; Billboard 200 – #48; Billboard Urban Albums – #12	—N/a	
Various artists	Bobby soundtrack	Album	November 21, 2006	The Weinstein Company	—N/a			
Jay-Z	Kingdom Come	Album	November 21, 2006	—N/a	"Show Me What You Got"; "Lost One"; "30 Something"; "Hollywood"	Canadian Albums – #6; Dutch Album Top 100 – 71; French Albums – #79; German Albums – #76; Irish Albums Chart – #40; Italian Albums – #67; Scottish Albums – #41; Sverigetopplistan – #45; Swiss Albums Chart – #17; UK Albums Chart – #35; Billboard 200 – #1; Billboard Urban Albums – #1	RIAA – 2× Platinum; BPI – Gold; MC – Platinum	
Young Jeezy	Thug Motivation 102: The Inspiration	Album	December 12, 2006	Corporate Thugz Entertainment	"I Luv It"; "Go Getta"; "Dreamin'"	Billboard 200 – #1; Billboard Urban Albums – #1	RIAA – Platinum	
Ghostface Killah	More Fish	Album	December 12, 2006	Starks Enterprises, LLC.	"Good"	Billboard 200 – #71; Billboard Urban Albums – #13	—N/a	
Nas	Hip Hop Is Dead	Album	December 19, 2006	The Jones Experience; Columbia Records; (Note: Although Nas left Columbia Records in 2005, the label (which formerly distributed Def Jam from the 1980s to the mid-1990s) managed to co-finance or sponsor two of the artists' albums, Hip Hop Is Dead (2006) and the untitled ninth album in 2008.)	"Hip Hop Is Dead"; "Can't Forget About You"	ARIA Charts – #50; Ultratop Belgian Albums (Wallonia) – #76; Canadian Albums – #45; Dutch Album Top 100 – #95; French Albums – #89; Swiss Albums Chart – #22; UK Albums Chart – #68; Billboard 200 – #1; Billboard Urban Albums – #1	RIAA – Gold; BPI – Silver	
DJ Clue?	The Professional 3	Album	December 19, 2006	Desert Storm Records	—N/a	Billboard 200 – #73; Billboard Urban Albums – #18		
Θηρίο	Ελιξίριο	Album	c. 2006	Family the Label; Universal Music Greece	—N/a			(Note: Released under Def Jam Greece)
T.N.S.	Στύλ Πιο Δυνατό	Album	c. 2006	Family the Label; Universal Music Greece	—N/a			
Various artists	Westwood: Ride for the Big Dawg	Compilation	c. 2006	—N/a				
Various artists	Westwood: The Greatest – Classic Jointz, Vol. 1–11	Compilation	c. 2006	—N/a				
Megan Rochell	"The One You Need" (featuring Fabolous)	Single	c. 2006	—N/a				
Mic Little	"Put It In a Letter"	Single	c. 2006	—N/a				
Young Leek	"Jiggle It"	Single	c. 2006	—N/a				

=== 2007 ===
Artist(s)	Title	Type	Release date	Label(s) released in association with	Singles	Chart positions	Certifications	Refs.
Redman	Red Gone Wild: Thee Album	Album	March 27, 2007	Gilla House Records	"Put It Down"	French Albums – #91; Swiss Albums Chart – #37; UK Albums Chart – #115; Billboard 200 – #13; Billboard R&B Albums – #4		
Ne-Yo	Because of You	Album	April 25, 2007	Compound Entertainment	"Because of You"; "Do You"; "Can We Chill"; "Go On Girl"	ARIA Charts – #39; Ultratop Belgian Albums (Flanders) – #59; Canadian Albums – #8; Dutch Album Top 100 – #30; French Albums – #175; German Albums – #54; Irish Albums – #34; Italian Albums – #97; New Zealand Albums – #34; Swiss Albums Chart – #49; UK Albums – #6; Billboard 200 – #1; Billboard Urban Albums – #1	RIAA – Platinum; BPI – Gold	
Bobby V	Special Occasion	Album	May 8, 2007		"Anonymous"; "Turn the Page"	Billboard 200 – #3; Billboard Urban Albums – #1		
U.S.D.A.	Cold Summer	Album	May 22, 2007	Corporate Thugz Entertainment	"White Girl"; "Corporate Thuggin'"	Billboard 200 – #4; Billboard Urban Albums – #1		
Rihanna	Good Girl Gone Bad		May 31, 2007	SRP Records	"Umbrella"; "Shut Up and Drive"; "Hate That I Love You"; "Don't Stop the Music"; "Rehab"	ARIA Charts – #2; Ö3 Austria Top 40 – #3; Ultratop Belgian Albums (Flanders) – #9; Ultratop Belgian Albums (Wallonia) – #9; Canadian Albums – #1; Hitlisten Danish Albums – #2; Dutch Album Top 100 – #20; Finnish Albums Chart – #7; French Albums – #8; German Albums – #4; Hungarian Albums – #4; Irish Albums Chart – #1; Italian Albums – #21; Top 100 Mexican Albums – #16; New Zealand Albums Chart – #8; Norwegian Albums Chart – #3; Polish Albums – #3; Portuguese Albums – #24; Spanish Albums – #9; Swedish Albums – #18; Swiss Albums Chart – #1; UK Albums Chart – #1; Billboard 200 – #2	RIAA – 6× Platinum; BPI – 7× Platinum; ARIA – 4× Platinum; IFPI (Austria) – Platinum	
Fabolous	From Nothin' to Somethin'		June 12, 2007	Desert Storm Records; Street Family Records	"Diamonds"; "Make Me Better"; "Baby Don't Go"; "Return of the Hustle"			
Yasuyuki Okamura	はっきりもっと勇敢になって	Maxi-single	September 5, 2007					

- Beanie Sigel – The Solution (State Property/Roc-A-Fella/Def Jam/IDJMG)
- Bobby Valentino – Special Occasion (DTP/Def Jam/IDJMG)
- Chingy – Hate It or Love It (DTP/Slot-A-Lot/Def Jam/IDJMG)
- Chrisette Michele – I Am
- Fabolous – From Nothin' to Somethin' (Desert Storm/Def Jam/IDJMG)
- Freeway – Free at Last (Roc-A-Fella/G-Unit/Def Jam/IDJMG)
- Ghostface Killah – The Big Doe Rehab (Starks Enterprises/Def Jam/IDJMG)
- Jay-Z – American Gangster (Roc-A-Fella/Def Jam/IDJMG)
- Kanye West – Graduation (Roc-A-Fella/Def Jam/IDJMG)
- Ne-Yo – Because of You
- Pittsburgh Slim – Tastemaker
- Playaz Circle – Supply & Demand (DTP/Def Jam/IDJMG)
- Redman – Red Gone Wild (Def Squad/Gillahouse/Def Jam/IDJMG)
- Rihanna – Good Girl Gone Bad (SRP/Def Jam/IDJMG)
- The-Dream – Love Hate (Radio Killa/Def Jam/IDJMG)
- USDA – Young Jeezy Presents USDA: Cold Summer (Corporate Thugz/Def Jam/IDJMG)

=== 2008 ===
- Ace Hood – Gutta (We the Best/Def Jam/IDJMG)
- Blood Raw – My Life: The True Testimony (Corporate Thugz/Def Jam/IDJMG)
- Kanye West – 808s & Heartbreak (Roc-A-Fella/Def Jam/IDJMG)
- Karina Pasian – First Love (Def Jam/IDJMG)
- LL Cool J – Exit 13 (Def Jam/IDJMG)
- Mariah Carey – E=MC² (Island/IDJMG)
- Ludacris – Theater of the Mind (DTP/Def Jam/IDJMG)
- Nas – Untitled (The Jones Experience/Def Jam/IDJMG)
- Ne-Yo – Year of the Gentleman (Def Jam/IDJMG)
- Rick Ross – Trilla (Slip-N-Slide/Def Jam/IDJMG)
- Rihanna – Good Girl Gone Bad: Reloaded (SRP/Def Jam/IDJMG)
- Rocko – Self-Made (Rocky Road/So So Def/Def Jam/IDJMG)
- The Roots – Rising Down (Def Jam/IDJMG)
- Young Jeezy – The Recession (Corporate Thugz/Def Jam/IDJMG)
- Brutha – Brutha (Goodfellas/Def Jam/IDJMG)
- Sterling Simms – Yours, Mine & The Truth (One Records/Def Jam/IDJMG)

=== 2009 ===
- Rihanna – Good Girl Gone Bad: The Remixes (SRP/Def Jam/IDJMG)
- The-Dream – Love vs. Money (Radio Killa/Def Jam/IDJMG)
- Jadakiss – The Last Kiss (Ruff Ryders/D-Block/Roc-A-Fella/Def Jam/IDJMG)
- Rick Ross – Deeper Than Rap (Maybach Music/Poe Boy/Def Jam/IDJMG)
- Method Man & Redman – Blackout! 2 (Def Jam/IDJMG)
- Chrisette Michele – Epiphany (Island Def Jam Music Group)
- Electrik Red – How to Be a Lady: Volume 1 (Def Jam Records/Radio Killa/IDJMG)
- Fast Life Yungstaz – Jamboree (Def Jam Records/IDJMG)
- Willy Northpole – Tha Connect (DTP/Def Jam/IDJMG)
- Unladylike – Certified (Voicez Music Group/Def Jam/IDJMG)
- Ace Hood – Ruthless (We the Best/Def Jam/IDJMG)
- Jeremih – Jeremih (Def Jam/IDJMG)
- Fabolous – Loso's Way (Desert Storm/Def Jam/IDJMG)
- Lil Ru – 21 & Up (Def Jam/IDJMG)
- Mariah Carey – Memoirs of an Imperfect Angel (Island/IDJMG)
- Playaz Circle – Flight 360: The Takeoff (DTP/Def Jam/IDJMG)
- Ghostface Killah – Ghostdini: Wizard of Poetry in Emerald City (Def Jam/IDJMG)
- Triple C's – Custom Cars & Cycles (Maybach Music Group/Def Jam/IDJMG)
- Amerie – In Love & War (Feenix Rising/Def Jam/IDJMG)
- Rihanna – Rated R (SRP/Def Jam/IDJMG)

== 2010s ==
=== 2010 ===
- Kanye West – VH1 Storytellers (Roc-A-Fella/Def Jam/IDJMG)
- Ludacris – Battle of the Sexes (DTP/Def Jam/IDJMG)
- Meth, Ghost & Rae – Wu-Massacre (Def Jam/IDJMG)
- Nas & Damian Marley – Distant Relatives (Universal Republic/IDJMG)
- Rihanna – Rated R: The Remixes (SRP/Def Jam/IDJMG)
- The Roots – How I Got Over (Def Jam/IDJMG)
- The-Dream – Love King (Radio Killa/Def Jam/IDJMG)
- Big Boi – Sir Lucious Left Foot: The Son of Chico Dusty (Def Jam/IDJMG)
- Curren$y – Pilot Talk (DD172/BluRoc/Def Jam/IDJMG)
- Rick Ross – Teflon Don (Maybach Music/Def Jam/IDJMG)
- Fabolous – There Is No Competition 2: The Grieving Music EP (Desert Storm/Def Jam/IDJMG)
- Jeremih – All About You (Def Jam/IDJMG)
- Rihanna – Loud (SRP/Def Jam/IDJMG)
- Kanye West – My Beautiful Dark Twisted Fantasy (Roc-A-Fella/Def Jam/IDJMG)
- Ne-Yo – Libra Scale (Def Jam/IDJMG)
- Curren$y – Pilot Talk II (DD172/BluRoc/Def Jam/IDJMG)
- Ronald Isley – Mr. I (Def Soul/IDJMG)
- Chrisette Michele – Let Freedom Reign (Def Jam/IDJMG)
- Redman – Reggie (Def Jam/IDJMG)
- Sheek Louch – Donnie G: Don Gorilla (D-Block/Def Jam/IDJMG)
- Ghostface Killah – Apollo Kids (Def Jam/IDJMG)

=== 2011 ===
Artist(s)	Title	Type	Release date	Label(s) released in association with	Singles	Chart positions	Certifications	Refs.
Big Sean	Finally Famous	Album	June 28, 2011	G.O.O.D. Music	"My Last"; "Marvin & Chardonnay"; "Dance (Ass)"	Canadian Albums – #20; Billboard 200 – #3; Billboard Top R&B/Hip-Hop Albums – #2	RIAA – Platinum	
Jay-Z & Kanye West	Watch the Throne	Album	August 8, 2011	Roc Nation	"H.A.M."; "Otis"; "Lift Off"; "Niggas in Paris"; "Why I Love You"; "Gotta Have It"; "No Church in the Wild"	ARIA – #2; ARIA Urban Albums – #1; Ö3 Austria Top 40 – #12; Ultratop Belgian Albums (Flanders) – #7; Ultratop Belgian Albums (Wallonia) – #16; Canadian Albums – #1; Hitlisten Danish Albums – #2; Dutch Album Top 100 – #3; Finnish Albums Chart – #23; French Albums – #10; German Albums – #2; Irish Albums Chart – #5; Japanese Albums – #14; New Zealand Albums Chart – #4; Norwegian Albums Chart – #1; Polish Albums – #21; Russian Albums – #8; Scottish Albums – #3; South Korean Albums – #57; Spanish Albums – #43; Swedish Albums – #27; Swiss Albums Chart – #1; UK Albums Chart – #3; UK R&B Albums – #1; Billboard 200 – #1; Billboard Top R&B/Hip-Hop Albums – #1; Billboard Top Catalog Albums – #19	ARIA – Platinum; Music Canada – Platinum; GLF – Gold; BPI – Platinum; RIAA – 5× Platinum	
Ace Hood	Blood, Sweat & Tears	Album	August 9, 2011	Dollaz N Dealz • We The Best	"Hustle Hard"; "Go 'N' Get It"; "Body 2 Body"	Billboard 200 – #8; Billboard Top R&B/Hip-Hop Albums – #1; Billboard Top Rap Albums – #1	—N/a	
Rihanna	Talk That Talk	Album	November 18, 2011	SRP Records	"We Found Love"; "You da One"; "Talk That Talk"; "Birthday Cake"; "Where Have You Been"; "Cockiness (Love It)"	ARIA – #5; ARIA Urban Albums – #1; Ö3 Austria Top 40 – #1; Ultratop Belgian Albums (Flanders) – #3; Ultratop Belgian Albums (Wallonia) – #6; Canadian Albums – #3; Croatian Albums – #13; Czech Republic Albums – #16; Hitlisten Danish Albums – #10; Finnish Albums Chart – #16; French Albums – #2; German Albums – #3; Greek Albums – #10; Hungarian Albums – #18; Irish Albums Chart – #2; Italian Albums – #10; Japanese Albums – #11; Mexican Albums – #21; Dutch Album Top 100 – #6; New Zealand Albums Chart – #1; Norwegian Albums Chart – #1; Polish Albums – #2; Portuguese Albums – #12; Russian Albums – #3; Scottish Albums – #1; South African Albums – #7; Spanish Albums – #6; Swedish Albums – #26; Swiss Albums Chart – #1; UK Albums Chart – #1; UK R&B Albums Chart – #1; Billboard 200 – #3; Billboard Top R&B/Hip-Hop Albums – #1	ARIA – Platinum; IFPI (Austria) – Gold; BEA – Gold; Pro-Música Brasil – Gold; IFPI (Denmark) – Gold; BVMI – Gold; MAHASZ – Gold; IRMA – 2× Platinum; FIMI – Gold; RIAJ – Gold; RMNZ – Platinum; ZPAV – 3× Platinum; RIAS – Gold; PROMUSICAE – Gold; GLF – Gold; IFPI (Switzerland) – Platinum; BPI – 3× Platinum; RIAA – 3× Platinum; IFPI (Europe) – Platinum	
The Roots	Undun	Album	December 6, 2011	—N/a	"Make My"	Swiss Albums Chart – #30; Billboard 200 – #17; Billboard Top R&B/Hip-Hop Albums – #4; Billboard Top Rap Albums – #2	—N/a	
Young Jeezy	Thug Motivation 103: Hustlerz Ambition	Album	December 20, 2011	CTE World	"Lose My Mind"; "Ballin'"; "F.A.M.E."; "I Do"; "Leave You Alone"	Billboard Hot 100 – #51; Billboard Top R&B/Hip-Hop Albums – #3; Billboard Top Rap Albums – #2; Billboard Rhythmic – #2	RIAA – Platinum	

=== 2012 ===
- Big K.R.I.T. – Live from the Underground (Cinematic Music Group/Def Jam)
- Frank Ocean – Channel Orange (Def Jam)
- Nas – Life Is Good (The Jones Experience/Def Jam)
- Rick Ross – God Forgives, I Don't (Maybach Music/Def Jam)
- 2 Chainz – Based on a T.R.U. Story (Def Jam)
- G.O.O.D. Music – Cruel Summer (G.O.O.D. Music/Def Jam)
- Rihanna – Unapologetic (SRP/Def Jam)
- Big Boi – Vicious Lies and Dangerous Rumors (Purple Ribbon/Def Jam)
- The-Dream – Terius Nash: 1977 (Radio Killa/Def Jam)

=== 2013 ===
- Trinidad James – Don't Be S.A.F.E. (Gold Gang/Def Jam/IDJMG)
- Fast & Furious 6 (Original Motion Picture Soundtrack) (Def Jam/IDJMG)
- The-Dream – IV Play (Radio Killa/Def Jam/IDJMG)
- Chrisette Michele – Better (Motown/IDJMG)
- Kanye West – Yeezus (Roc-A-Fella/Def Jam/IDJMG)
- August Alsina – Downtown: Life Under the Gun (Radio Killa/Def Jam/IDJMG)
- Big Sean – Hall of Fame (G.O.O.D. Music/Def Jam/IDJMG)
- 2 Chainz – B.O.A.T.S. II: Me Time (Def Jam/IDJMG)
- Pusha T – My Name Is My Name (G.O.O.D. Music/Def Jam/IDJMG)
- Jhené Aiko – Sail Out (Artium/Def Jam/IDJMG)

=== 2014 ===
- Rick Ross – Mastermind (Maybach Music/Def Jam)
- YG – My Krazy Life (Pu$haz Ink/Corporate Thugz/Def Jam/IDJMG)
- August Alsina – Testimony (Radio Killa/Def Jam/IDJMG)
- Afrojack – Forget the World (Wall/PM:AM/Def Jam/IDJMG)
- The Roots – …And Then You Shoot Your Cousin (Def Jam/IDJMG)
- Mariah Carey – Me. I Am Mariah... The Elusive Chanteuse (Def Jam/IDJMG)
- Common – Nobody's Smiling (Artium/Def Jam/IDJMG)
- Iggy Azalea – The New Classic (Mercury/IDJMG)
- Young Jeezy – Seen It All: The Autobiography (Corporate Thugz/Def Jam/IDJMG)
- Jhené Aiko – Souled Out (Artium/Def Jam/IDJMG)
- Lacrim – Corleone (Def Jam France/IDJMG)
- Elijah Blake – Drift (Artium/Def Jam/IDJMG)
- Vince Staples – Hell Can Wait (Artium/Def Jam/IDJMG)
- Logic – Under Pressure (Visionary/Def Jam/IDJMG)
- Teyana Taylor – VII (G.O.O.D. Music/Def Jam/IDJMG)
- Big K.R.I.T. – Cadillactica (Cinematic Music Group/Def Jam/IDJMG)
- Rick Ross – Hood Billionaire (Maybach Music/Def Jam/IDJMG)
- Iggy Azalea – Reclassified (Mercury/IDJMG)
- YG – Blame It On the Streets (Pu$haz Ink/Corporate Thugz/Def Jam/IDJMG)
- Ludacris – Burning Bridges (DTP/Def Jam/IDJMG)
- Fabolous – The Young OG Project (Desert Storm/Def Jam/IDJMG)

== Albums directly through Universal Music ==
=== 2015 ===
- Big Sean – Dark Sky Paradise (G.O.O.D. Music/Def Jam)
- Ludacris – Ludaversal (DTP/Def Jam)
- Alesso – FOREVER (Refune Music/Def Jam)
- Lil Durk – Remember My Name (OTF/Def Jam)
- Tamia – Love Life (Plus 1/Def Jam)
- Elijah Blake – Shadows & Diamonds (Artium/Def Jam)
- Vince Staples – Summertime '06 (Artium/Def Jam)
- Krept & Konan – The Long Way Home (Def Jam/Virgin EMI)
- Gunplay – Living Legend (Bilderburg/Maybach Music/Def Jam)
- Alessia Cara – Four Pink Walls (EP Entertainment/Def Jam)
- Leona Lewis – I Am (Def Jam/Island)
- Kacy Hill – BLOO (G.O.O.D. Music/Def Jam)
- The Braxtons – Braxton Family Christmas
- Justin Bieber – Purpose (School Boy/RBMG/Def Jam)
- Young Jeezy – Church In These Streets (Corporate Thugz/Def Jam)
- Logic – The Incredible True Story (Visionary/Def Jam)
- Alessia Cara – Know It All (EP Entertainment/Def Jam)
- Jadakiss – Top 5 Dead or Alive (D-Block/Def Jam)
- Jeremih – Late Nights (Mick Schultz/Def Jam)
- Rick Ross – Black Market (Maybach Music/Def Jam)
- Babyface – Return of the Tender Lover (Def Jam)
- August Alsina – This Thing Called Life (NNTME/Def Jam)
- Pusha T – King Push – Darkest Before Dawn: The Prelude (G.O.O.D. Music/Def Jam)

=== 2016 ===
- Kanye West – The Life of Pablo (GOOD/Def Jam)
- HXLT – HXLT (GOOD/Def Jam)
- 2 Chainz – ColleGrove (TRU/Def Jam)
- TWENTY88 – TWENTY88 (ARTium/GOOD/Def Jam)
- Bibi Bourelly – Free the Real (Pt. 1) (Def Jam)
- YG – Still Brazy (4Hunnid/CTE World/Def Jam)
- Desiigner – New English (Spirit Preach/GOOD/Def Jam)
- Lil Durk – Lil Durk 2X (OTF/Def Jam)
- Frank Ocean – Endless (Fresh Produce/Def Jam)
- Vince Staples – Prima Donna (Blacksmith/ARTium/Def Jam)
- Troi Irons – Turbulence (Circa 13/Def Jam)
- Jeezy – Trap or Die 3 (YJ Music/Def Jam)
- YG – Red Friday (4Hunnid/CTE World/Def Jam)
- Common – Black America Again (ARTium/Def Jam)
- Def Jam Presents Direct Deposit, Vol. 1

=== 2017 ===
- Big Sean – I Decided (GOOD/Def Jam)
- Amir Obè – None of the Clocks Work (Def Jam)
- Logic – ΞVERYBODY (Visionary/Def Jam)
- Axwell Λ Ingrosso – More Than You Know – EP (Axtone/Def Jam)
- 2 Chainz – Pretty Girls Like Trap Music (TRU/Def Jam)
- Vince Staples – Big Fish Theory (Blacksmith/Def Jam)
- Kacy Hill – Like a Woman (GOOD/Def Jam)
- Dave East – Paranoia: A True Story (Mass Appeal/Def Jam)
- DaniLeigh – Summer With Friends (Def Jam)
- Jhené Aiko – Trip (Art Club/Def Jam)
- Big Sean & Metro Boomin' – Double or Nothing (Boominati/GOOD/Def Jam/Republic)
- Tee Grizzley & Lil Durk – Bloodas (Only The Family/300/Def Jam)
- Jeezy – Pressure (YJ Music/Agency 99/Def Jam)
- Payroll Giovanni & Cardo – Big Bossin Vol. 1.5 (Def Jam)
- Def Jam Presents Direct Deposit, Vol. 2
- Ai – Wa to Yo (EMI/Def Jam)

=== 2018 ===
- Dave East – Paranoia 2 (From The Dirt/Mass Appeal/Def Jam)
- Payroll Giovanni & Cardo – Big Bossin, Vol. 2 (Def Jam)
- 2 Chainz – The Play Don't Care Who Makes It (Gamebread/Def Jam)
- Valee – GOOD Job, You Found Me (GOOD/Def Jam)
- Logic – Bobby Tarantino II (Visionary/Def Jam)
- Jeremih – The Chocolate Box – EP (Def Jam)
- Toni Braxton – Sex & Cigarettes (Def Jam)
- 070 Shake – Glitter (GOOD/Def Jam)
- Desiigner – L.O.D. (GOOD/Def Jam)
- Various Artists – Rapture (Music from the Netflix Original TV Series) (Netflix/Def Jam)
- Pusha T – Daytona (GOOD/Def Jam)
- Kanye West – Ye (GOOD/Def Jam)
- Kids See Ghosts – Kids See Ghosts (GOOD/Def Jam)
- Nas – Nasir (Mass Appeal/Def Jam)
- Teyana Taylor – K.T.S.E. (GOOD/Def Jam)
- Bobby Sessions – RVLTN (Chapter 1): The Divided States Of AmeriKKKa (High Standardz/Def Jam)
- K. Roosevelt – K. Roosevelt (Def Jam)
- YG – Stay Dangerous (4Hunnid/Def Jam)
- Amir Obè – Can't Be A ____ Here: Chapter 1 (Def Jam)
- Logic – Young Sinatra IV (Visionary/Def Jam)
- Beau Young Prince – Groovy Land (Def Jam)
- Dave East & Styles P – Beloved (From The Dirt/Mass Appeal/Def Jam)
- Amir Obè – Can't Be A ____ Here: Chapter 2 (Def Jam)
- Various Artists – The Hate U Give (Original Motion Picture Soundtrack) (Def Jam)
- Fetty Luciano – Story To Tell (Def Jam)
- MihTy – MihTy (Def Jam/Atlantic)
- Vince Staples – FM! (Def Jam)
- Amir Obè – Can't Be A ____ Here: Chapter 3 (Def Jam)
- Bobby Sessions – RVLTN (Chapter 2): The Art of Resistance (High Standardz/Def Jam)
- 2 Chainz – Hot Wings Are a Girl's Best Friend (Gamebread/Def Jam)
- Alessia Cara – The Pains of Growing (EP/Def Jam)
- DaniLeigh – The Plan (Def Jam)
- TJ Porter – Pregame (Def Jam)
- YFL Kelvin – Outta Here (Def Jam)

=== 2019 ===
- Boston George & Diego – Boston George & Diego (YJ Music/Def Jam)
- TJ Porter – No Disturbance EP (Def Jam)
- 2 Chainz – Rap or Go to the League (Gamebread/Def Jam)
- Various Artists – Undisputed (Def Jam)
- Bernard Jabs – COLD HEARTED (Def Jam)
- Cosha TG – Summer Nights (Mosley/Def Jam)
- Maxo – LIL BIG MAN (Def Jam)
- Suzi Wu – Error 404 (Def Jam)
- Logic – Supermarket (Visionary/Def Jam)
- Hit-Boy & SOB X RBE – Family Not a Group (Def Jam)
- Sneakk – Say Less (Def Jam)
- Logic – Confessions of a Dangerous Mind (Visionary/Def Jam)
- 10k.Caash – The Creator (Def Jam)
- YG – 4REAL 4REAL (4Hunnid/Def Jam)
- S3nsi Molly & Lil Brook – Dumb Shit: The Album (Def Jam)
- Nimic Revenue – Lifeline EP (Def Jam)
- TJ Porter – Voice of the Trenches (Def Jam)
- Valee – Runnin' Rich (GOOD/Def Jam)
- Nas – The Lost Tapes 2 (Mass Appeal/Def Jam)
- Pvrx – 3.14 (Def Jam)
- Nasaan – Kiss of Karma (Def Jam)
- Jeezy – TM104: The Legend of the Snowman (YJ Music/Def Jam)
- Landstrip Chip – From My Point Of View: Reloaded (Def Jam)
- Alessia Cara – This Summer (Def Jam)
- Yung Tory – Still Here (Mosley/Def Jam)
- Goon des Garcons – Cheers To The End Of The World (Def Jam)
- YK Osiris – The Golden Child (Def Jam)
- Kanye West – Jesus Is King (GOOD/Def Jam)
- Dave East – Survival (From The Dirt/Mass Appeal/Def Jam)
- Kaash Paige – Parked Car Convos (Kaash Paige LLC/Def Jam)
- Fredo Bang – Pain Made Me Numb (Bang Biz Ent./Def Jam)
- Nimic Revenue – Lifeline Reloaded (Def Jam)
- Fabolous – Summertime Shootout 3: Coldest Summer Ever (Desert Storm/Def Jam)
- DaniLeigh – My Present (Def Jam)
- Ai – Kansha!!!!! - Thank You for 20 Years New and Best (EMI/Def Jam)

=== 2020 ===
- 070 Shake – Modus Vivendi (GOOD/Def Jam)
- 10k.Caash – Planet Swajjur
- John Lindahl – Opening Night (BobbyBoy/Def Jam)
- Justin Bieber – Changes (RBMG/Def Jam)
- Jadakiss – Ignatius (So Raspy/D-Block/Def Jam)
- Jhené Aiko – Chilombo (ArtClub/Def Jam)
- MAJ – Majestic (Electric Feel/Def Jam)
- MAJ – The Exotic Party – EP (Electric Feel/Def Jam)
- Fredo Bang – Most Hated (Se Lavi/Def Jam)
- Trouble – Thug Luv (Eardruma/Def Jam)
- Bino Rideaux – OUTSIDE (Out The Blue/Do What You Love/Def Jam)
- John Lindahl – Opening Night: The Complete Score (BobbyBoy/Def Jam)
- Teyana Taylor – The Album (GOOD/Def Jam)
- Nasty C & DJ Whoo Kid – Zulu : Mixtape (Def Jam/ Capitol Records)
- Alessia Cara – This Summer: Live off the Floor (Def Jam)
- Logic – No Pressure (Visionary/Def Jam)
- Dave East – Karma 3 (Mass Appeal/Def Jam)
- Bobby Sessions – RVLTH (Chapter 3) : The Price of Freedom (Def Jam)
- Fredo Bang – In the Name Of Gee (Se Lavi/Def Jam)
- Public Enemy – What You Gonna Do When the Grid Goes Down? (Def Jam)
- YG – My Life 4Hunnid (4Hunnid/Def Jam)
- Saint Bodhi – Mad World (Def Jam)
- Kaash Paige – Teenage Fever
- John Lindahl – A John Lindahl Holiday (Elysium/Def Jam)
- Big Sean – Detroit 2 (GOOD/Def Jam)
- 2 Chainz – So Help Me God! (Gamebread/Def Jam)
- DaniLeigh – MOVIE
- Jeezy – The Recession 2 (YJ Music/Def Jam)
- Alessia Cara – Holiday Stuff (Def Jam)
- Ai – It's All Me, Vol. 1 (EMI/Def Jam)
- Nasty C – Zulu Man with Some Power (Def Jam/ Universal Recordings)

=== 2021 ===
- Alessia Cara – In the Meantime (EP/Def Jam)
- Blade Runner: Black Lotus (Soundtrack) (22:10/Def Jam)
- Fredo Bang – Still Most Hated (Se Lavi/Def Jam)
- Tyhzaei – Noir (Def Jam)
- Various Artists – Coming 2 America (Amazon Studios/Def Jam)
- Jhené Aiko – Sailing Soul(s): 2021 version (ArtClub/Def Jam)
- Justin Bieber – Justice (Def Jam)
- Logic – Bobby Tarantino III (Bobby Boy/Visionary/Def Jam)
- DMX – Exodus (Def Jam)
- Bobby Sessions – Manifest (Def Jam)
- Goon des Garcon – Sheesh!
- Fredo Bang – Murder Made Me (Se Lavi/Def Jam)
- Roddy Rackzz – Realest Richest Youngin
- Kanye West – Donda (GOOD/Def Jam)
- Big Sean and Hit-Boy – What You Expect (FF to Def/HS87/Def Jam)
- Snoop Dogg Presents Algorithm (Doggy Style/Def Jam)
- Saint Bodhi – Antisocial
- La the Goat – 813 Day (So So Def/Def Jam)
- Ai – It's All Me, Vol. 2 (EMI/Def Jam)

=== 2022 ===
- 2 Chainz – Dope Don't Sell Itself (T.R.U./Gamebread/Def Jam)
- Ai – Dream (EMI/Def Jam)
- Kajo – Cold Places (Elysium/Def Jam)
- Queens: Music from the ABC Original Series (Season One)
- The Women of Def Jam
- Jeremih – Late Nights with Jeremih (anniversary re-release)
- Fredo Bang Two-Face Bang 2 (Se Lavi/Def Jam)
- Pusha T – It's Almost Dry (GOOD/Def Jam)
- 070 Shake – You Can't Kill Me (GOOD/Def Jam)
- Logic – Vinyl Days (Visionary/Def Jam)
- YBN Nahmir – Faster Car Music (Def Jam)
- YG – I Got Issues (4Hunnid/Def Jam)
- Jeezy & DJ Drama – Snofall (YJ Music/Def Jam)
- Fredo Bang – UNLV (Se Lavi/Def Jam)
- Various Artists – Black Panther: Wakanda Forever – Music from and Inspired By (Roc Nation/Hollywood/Def Jam)
- Nasty C – Ivyson Army Tour Mixtape

=== 2023 ===
- Nasty C – I Love It Here

=== 2024 ===
- Vince Staples – Dark Times

=== 2025 ===
- Justin Bieber – Swag
- Justin Bieber – Swag II
