= True to Life =

True to Life may refer to:

- "True to Life", a song by Roxy Music from Avalon, 1982
- "True to Life", a song by Röyksopp from Junior, 2009
- True to Life (film), a 1943 film directed by George Marshall
- True to Life (Lisette Melendez album), 1994
- True to Life (Ray Charles album), 1977
