= Together Forever (Lisette Melendez album) =

Studio album by Lisette Melendez
- Released: 1991
- Studio: Hip Pocket Recording, Unique Recording Studios
- Genre: Latin freestyle, dance-pop
- Length: 58:44
- Label: Fever/Sony/Columbia
- Producer: Carlos Berrios (all tracks), Andy Marvel (track 9)

Lisette Melendez chronology
Together Forever (1991)	True to Life (1994)

Singles from Together Forever
- 1. "Together Forever" Released: 1991; 2. "A Day In My Life (Without You)" Released: 1991; 3. "Never Say Never" Released: 1992

Together Forever is the debut album by Puerto Rican-American singer Lisette Melendez, released in 1991 by Columbia Records. The album reached the top ten of the Billboard Heatseekers chart.

Three singles were released. "Together Forever" reached number 35 on the Billboard Hot 100 in April 1991. The second single, "A Day in My Life (Without You)", rose to number 49 on the Hot 100. "Never Say Never" appeared on the dance charts at number 45 in March 1992.

The album was released in Japan on July 1, 1994, after the success of the song "Goody Goody" and the album True to Life. Together Forever stayed for one week on the Oricon chart, peaking at number 100.

== Track listing ==
No.	Title	Writer(s)	Length
1.	"Together Forever"	Carlos Berrios, Franc Reyes, Frank Malave	6:00
2.	"A Day in My Life (Without You)"	Lisette Melendez, Berrios, Reyes	3:50
3.	"Stranger in My House of Love"	Berrios, Reyes	4:20
4.	"I'm Holding Out"	Barry White, Berrios, Reyes	5:08
5.	"Never Say Never"	Berrios, Reyes	4:29
6.	"He's My Baby Now"	Berrios, Reyes	4:41
7.	"Empty Spaces"	Berrios, Reyes	4:30
8.	"Please Please Me"	Berrios, Reyes	5:51
9.	"A Place for You"	Andy Marvel, Abby Greenberg	4:54
10.	"Remember the Rain"	Kenneth Gamble, Leon Huff	4:48
11.	"A Day in My Life (Without You)" (After Dark Mix)		6:16
12.	"The Red Zone"		4:22

== Charts ==
Chart (1991)	Peak position
Australian Albums (ARIA)	199
US Billboard Heatseekers	7
Japan Oricon chart	100

Singles - Billboard (United States)

Year	Single	Chart	Position
1991	"Together Forever"	The Billboard Hot 100	35
1991	"Together Forever"	Hot Dance Music/Club Play	31
1991	"Together Forever"	Hot Dance Music/Maxi-Singles Sales	11
1991	"A Day in My Life (Without You)"	The Billboard Hot 100	49
1991	"A Day in My Life (Without You)"	Hot Dance Music/Club Play	30
1991	"A Day in My Life (Without You)"	Hot Dance Music/Maxi-Singles Sales	6
1992	"Never Say Never"	Hot Dance Music/Club Play	45
1992	"Never Say Never"	Hot Dance Music/Maxi-Singles Sales	12
