= Lil Ru =

American rapper

Lil' Ru
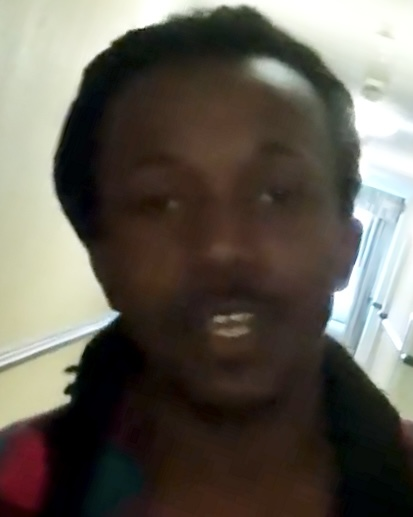
- Lil Ru in 2011

Background information
- Also known as: Boobie Samuel
- Born: Sylvester Samuels c. 1985; Ridgeway, South Carolina, U.S.
- Origin: Columbia, South Carolina, U.S.
- Genres: Hip hop
- Occupation: Rapper
- Years active: 2001–present
- Labels: Capitol Records; Def Jam Recordings; Elektra Records; Head Hunter Records; Presidential Music

Sylvester Samuels, (born c. 1985) better known by his stage name Lil Ru, also known as Boobie Samuel, is an American rapper signed to Def Jam Recordings. His debut album, 21 & Up was released on August 25, 2009. After Angie Stone helped him secure a deal with Elektra Records, he became unsigned again after the label merged with Atlantic Records.

His 2001 debut single was "Will Destroy". He then released his 2002 follow up, "Shawty What You Doin’". Both songs reached the Billboard R&B/Hip-Hop charts and he was signed to Capitol Records.

In 2007 Capitol released the Don’t I Look Good, which included the single "I’m Spinnin’ It". After touring and promoting the album, in March 2009 he was signed to the Def Jam label. He released the single "Nasty Song", then in 2011 appeared on Dirty Dave's single Fast Lane featuring Gucci Mane and Slycka Slyck. The music video was shot and directed by Yung Joc.

In 2015 Ru launched his label Presidential Music, and released his "Key Is Mind Vol. 1".

In 2018 Lil Ru collaborated with Pioneer of pimp hop, Jacksonville rapper Natalac where he featured on "Playground" from Natalac's most star-studded featured album Pimp of the Nation released on U.S. federal Holiday "Presidents Day" Monday, February 19th, 2018.

== Charts ==
Billboard

Album	Chart	Peak position
21 & Up	Top R&B/Hip-Hop Albums	36

== Discography ==
Studio albums

- For Her (2019)
- Boobie Trap (2018)
- Key is Mind Vol. 1 (2015)
- Motion of Discovery (2013)
- No Gold Teeth, No Tattoos (2011)
- 21 & Up (2009)
- They Talk, I Grind (2009)
- Microwave Music (2008)
- Hustle Hard: Microwave Music (2007)
- Don't I Look Good/I'm Spinnin' It (2007)
- Hustle Hard: 500 Grams (2005)

=== As featured artist ===
List of singles as featured artist
Title	Year	Album
"Playground" (Natalac featuring Lil Ru)	2018	Pimp of the Nation
