= Goody Goody (Lisette Melendez song) =

Single by Lisette Melendez

from the album True to Life
- Released: November 1993
- Genre: Hip hop; freestyle
- Length: 4:11
- Songwriters: Kenny Dias; Randy Ramos

Lisette Melendez singles chronology
"Never Say Never" (1991)	"Goody Goody" (1993)	"Will You Ever Save Me" (1994)

"Goody Goody" is a song by American hip-hop and freestyle singer Lisette Melendez, released in November 1993 as the first single from her second album, True to Life (1994). The song was written by Kenny Dias and Randy Ramos, and became a moderate hit in the US, reaching No. 53 on the Billboard Hot 100. In Japan, the song reached No. 95 on the Oricon charts. The accompanying music video was directed by Rosie Perez.

== Critical reception ==
Pan-European magazine Music & Media wrote, "Put on your goody two shoes and follow this soul sister, who yells the one easily singable line that so many swing beat outings lack to make it on European radio." Jonathan Bernstein from Spin felt the album True to Life "contains a sugar-rush of a standout" in "Goody Goody".

== Tracks ==
No.	Title	Length
1.	"Goody Goody" (Radio Edit)	4:11
2.	"Goody Goody" (Hip Hop Mix)	5:41
3.	"Goody Goody" (Radio Edit (No Rap))	4:11
4.	"Goody Goody" (LP Version)	5:14
5.	"Goody Goody" (House Mix Radio Edit)	4:30
6.	"Goody Goody" (Mantecka Edit)	4:22

== Charts ==
Chart (1993–1994)	Peak position
Japan (Oricon)	95
US Billboard Hot 100	53
US Hot Dance Music/Club Play (Billboard)	44
US Hot Dance Music/Maxi-Singles Sales (Billboard)	23
US Hot R&B Singles (Billboard)	95
US Rhythmic Top 40 (Billboard)	16
US Cash Box Top 100	48
