= 21 & Up =

Studio album by Lil Ru
- Released: August 25, 2009
- Genre: Hip-hop
- Label: Def Jam
- Producer: Chris Flame, Ben Frank, Trilla

Professional ratings
Review scores
Source	Rating
AllMusic	2.5/5 stars

21 & Up is the debut album by rapper Lil Ru. It was released on August 25, 2009, through Def Jam Recordings.The album sold 1,456 copies in its first week.

== Track listing ==
No.	Title	Length
1.	"All I Ever Know"	3:43
2.	"The Nasty Song"	3:27
3.	"Yeah, Dat's Money"	2:59
4.	"I'm Bad"	2:52
5.	"Life"	2:43
6.	"Sexy Ladies"	3:41
7.	"F*** Somethin"	3:46
8.	"Ride"	3:25
9.	"I Know What You Like"	3:14
10.	"Feenin Me"	3:31
11.	"Problems"	4:01
12.	"Give It Up"	3:29

== Charts ==
Billboard

Chart	Peak position
Top R&B/Hip-Hop Albums	36
