= Never Say Never (Lisette Melendez song) =

Single by Lisette Melendez

from the album Together Forever
- Released: 1991
- Studio: Hip Pocket Studios
- Genre: Freestyle
- Length: 3:57
- Label: Fever; Rush Associated Labels; Columbia
- Songwriters: Carlos Berrios; Franc Reyes
- Producer: Carlos Berrios

Lisette Melendez singles chronology
"A Day in My Life (Without You)" (1991)	"Never Say Never" (1991)	"Goody Goody" (1993)

Music video
- "Never Say Never" on YouTube

"Never Say Never" is a song by American hip-hop and Freestyle music singer Lisette Melendez, released in 1991, by Fever, Rush Associated Labels and Columbia Records, as the third single from her debut album, Together Forever (1991). The song was written by Carlos Berrios and Franc Reyes, and produced by Berrios. Unlike the previous singles, it was released only on cassette and LP 12" only clubs, where it achieved moderate success in stop dance music of the United States, peaking at number 45 on the Billboard Hot Dance Music/Club Play chart in 1992.

== Tracks ==
12" single

No.	Title	Length
1.	"Never Say Never" (New School Freestyle)	5:21
2.	"Never Say Never" (New School Radio)	3:57
3.	"Never Say Never" (Underground Solution)	5:00
4.	"Never Say Never" (Never Say "After Dark" Mix)	5:56
5.	"Never Say Never" (Melendapella)	2:57
6.	"Never Say Never" (Never More Beats)	2:00

12 "Single (Promo)

No.	Title	Length
1.	"Never Say Never" (Pop Radio Mix)	3:50
2.	"Never Say Never" (Hot AC Mix)	3:50

== Charts ==
Chart (1992)	Peak position
Australia (ARIA)	168
US Hot Dance Music/Club Play (Billboard)	45
US Hot Dance Music/Maxi-Singles Sales (Billboard)	12
