= Number 1 Spot =

#1 Spot is a music compilation album distributed by Def Jam. Released June 14, 2005, it features seventeen hip hop R&B hits in chronological order which were released since the launch of the record label in 1985 until 2003, including releases under the Island and the now-defunct Def Soul imprints. Hence the title of the album (which was inspired by a song by Ludacris), all went to the number-one spot on the Billboard R&B chart, with five songs reaching the Billboard Hot 100 number-one spot: This Is How We Do It, Incomplete, Always on Time, Foolish and Stand Up.

== Track listing ==
1. The Rain - Oran "Juice" Jones
2. I Need Love - LL Cool J
3. This Is How We Do It - Montell Jordan
4. I'll Be There for You/You're All I Need to Get By - Mary J. Blige and Method Man
5. In My Bed - Dru Hill
6. Never Make a Promise - Dru Hill
7. Let's Ride - Master P, Montell Jordan and Silkk the Shocker
8. Friend of Mine - Kelly Price, R. Kelly and Ronald Isley
9. How Deep Is Your Love - Dru Hill and Redman
10. Get It on Tonite - Montell Jordan
11. Incomplete - Sisqo
12. Missing You - Case
13. Always on Time - Ja Rule and Ashanti
14. Foolish - Ashanti
15. Luv U Better - LL Cool J
16. Excuse Me Miss - Jay-Z and Pharrell Williams
17. Stand Up - Ludacris and Shawnna
