= A Day in My Life (Without You) =

Single by Lisette Melendez

from the album Together Forever
- Released: 1991
- Genre: Freestyle
- Length: 6:00
- Songwriters: Carlos Berrios, Lisette Melendez, Franc Reyes

Lisette Melendez singles chronology
"Together Forever" (1990)	"A Day in My Life (Without You)" (1991)	"Never Say Never" (1991)

"A Day in My Life (Without You)" is the second single from the album Together Forever, released by singer of hip-hop and freestyle music, Lisette Melendez, in 1991. Although it has not achieved the same success of the previous single, the song was close to becoming a hit, reaching No. 49 on the Billboard Hot 100 on November 9, 1991. In Canada, the song remained on the chart of dance songs for a week, peaking at No.10.

== Track listing ==
12" single

No.	Title	Length
1.	"A Day in My Life (Without You)" (New School Club)	6:14
2.	"A Day in My Life (Without You)" (New School Radio)	3:48
3.	"A Day in My Life (Without You)" (The After Dark Mix)	6:13
4.	"A Day in My Life (Without You)" (Melendepella)	5:08
5.	"A Day in My Life (Without You)" (Berrios Beats)	2:27

== Charts ==
Chart (1991)	Peak position
Canada RPM Dance	10
US Billboard Hot 100	49
US Hot Dance Music/Club Play	30
US Hot Dance Music/Maxi-Singles Sales	6
