= New Day (Patti LaBelle song) =

Single by Patti LaBelle

from the album Timeless Journey
- Released: March 23, 2004
- Length: 3:19
- Label: Def Soul Classics
- Songwriter(s): Patti LaBelle; Pierre Medor; Dwayne Nesmith; Tiffany Palmer; Carlos Ricketts; Jason Rome
- Producer(s): Rome; The Corner Boys

Patti LaBelle singles chronology
"Does He Love You" (1997)	"New Day" (2004)	"Gotta Go Solo" (2004)

"New Day" is a song recorded by America singer Patti LaBelle. It was written by LaBelle along with Pierre Medor, Dwayne Nesmith, Tiffany Palmer, Carlos Ricketts, and Jason Rome for her 2004 studio album Timeless Journey, while production was helmed by Rome along with The Corner Boys. Released as the first single from the album, it became a minor hit for the singer, reaching number 36 on the US Billboard Hot R&B/Hip-Hop Songs and number 93 on the Billboard Hot 100, marking LaBelle's first appearance on the Hot 100 since 1997. An EP of dance remixes titled New Day Club Mixes, was released to support the song in dance clubs, and was remixed by a variety of dance producers such as Louis Vega, Quentin Harris, Kryia & Velez, and Darryl James. It reached number eleven on the Hot Dance Club Songs.

== Live performances ==
Patti gave a notable performance of the track at the MGM Grand Las Vegas when she headlined VH1 Divas 2004.

== Charts ==
Chart (2004)	Peak position
US Billboard Hot 100	93
US Dance Club Songs (Billboard) Dance Mixes	11
US Hot R&B/Hip-Hop Songs (Billboard)	36
