= White Girl =

White Girl(s) or The White Girl(s) may refer to:

== Books ==
- The White Girl (novel), by Tony Birch, 2019
- White Girls, a 2013 book by Hilton Als

== Film and TV ==
- The White Girl (1990 film), a 1990 American film
- White Girl (2008 film), a 2008 British film
- White Girl (2016 film), a 2016 American film
- The White Girl (2017 film), a 2017 Hong Kong film directed by Jenny Suen and Christopher Doyle

== Music ==
- "White Girl", song by Lil Wayne from Free Weezy Album
- "White Girl", song by Lari White from My First Affair
- "White Girl", song by Trina from Amazin'
- "White Girl", song by Lil Peep from Come Over When You're Sober, Pt. 2
- "White Girl", song by Johnny Cash Bitter Tears: Ballads of the American Indian
- "White Girl", song by Soul Coughing from Irresistible Bliss
- "White Girl", song by U.S.D.A. from Cold Summer
- "White Girl", song by X from Wild Gift

== See also ==
- Symphony in White, No. 1: The White Girl, a painting by James Whistler
- Symphony in White, No. 2: The Little White Girl, a painting by James Whistler
- Black Girl / White Girl, a 2006 book by Joyce Carol Oates
- White Chicks, 2004 American film
