= Lisette Melendez =

American singer

- Born: August 20, 1967 (age 59); East Harlem, New York City, U.S.
- Genres: Freestyle, Latin pop, dance-pop
- Occupation: Singer

Lisette Melendez (born August 20, 1967) is an American freestyle/Latin pop/dance-pop singer. She is best known for her Top 40 hit "Together Forever", which reached No. 35 on the Billboard Hot 100 in 1991, and its follow-up "A Day In My Life (Without You)", which peaked at No. 49.

== Career ==
Melendez got her break in 1988 and sang backing vocals for a track by dance music record producer Carlos Berrios, who had also worked with Sweet Sensation and Samantha Fox. A few years of dance club touring eventually led to the recording of the single "Together Forever" Produced By Carlos Berrios and Platinum Producer Frankie Cutlass, and soon after a full album with Fever/Columbia Records.

=== 1990s ===
Four more albums followed, including her second album True to Life in 1994, which included the Billboard Hot 100 hit "Goody Goody" (No. 53) as well as "Will You Ever Save Me" which reached No. 38 on the Rhythmic Top 40 chart. The album was both a commercial and critical success in Japan. In 1998, she released her third album, Un Poco De Mi, a salsa album sung in Spanish. It scored a hit with "Algo de Mi", which peaked at No. 8 on the Latin Tropical/Salsa Airplay chart and No. 23 on the Hot Latin Tracks chart. Her fourth album, released later in 1998, was Imagination. The lead single was "Time Passes By", but it did not gain the radio airplay and success of her previous singles.

=== 2000s ===
Melendez teamed up with fellow freestyle singer Cynthia in 2005, releasing the single "I Can't Change Your Mind" as the duo Liscyn. She continues to tour as of 2006.

Melendez teamed up with famed music producer Carlos "After Dark" Berrios in 2008, performing two new tracks "I Need a Lover" and "Don't Ever Say" on albums Don't Look Back Sessions One & Two.

Melendez also performed at the I Love Freestyle Vol. 1 Live Concert event on January 17, 2015, at the Resorts World Casino in Buffalo, New York, along with fellow freestyle artists Jade Starling, Sa-Fire, Lisa Lisa and others.

== Discography ==
=== Studio albums ===
Year	Album details	Chart peaks			
Year	Album details	US R&B	US Top Heat	AUS	JPN
1991	Together Forever: Released: 1991; Label: Columbia / Fever Records / RAL	—	7	199	100
1994	True to Life: Released: January 18, 1994; Label: Chaos Recordings / R.A.L.	100	28	—	3
1997	Imagination: Released: December 17, 1997; Label: Victor / Warlock Records	—	—	—	—
1998	Un Poco De Mi: Released: March 10, 1998; Label: WEA Latina	—	—	—	—
2000	Greatest Hits: Released: 2000; Label: Warlock Records / Fever Records	—	—	—	—
"—" denotes a release that did not make the stop.

=== Singles ===
- 1988: "Make Noise"
- 1990: "If You Truly Love Me"
- 1990: "Together Forever"
- 1990-1991 "Stranger (In my House of Love)"
- 1991: "A Day in My Life (Without You)"
- 1991: "Never Say Never"
- 1993: "Goody Goody"
- 1994: "Will You Ever Save Me"
- 1996: "Time Passes By"
- 1998: "Algo De Mi"
- 1998: "Make the Way"
- 2002 "Stay" (under Lelah Paine)
- 2005: "I Can't Change Your Mind"
- 2018: "Rise"

=== Videos ===
Year	Title	Director (s)
1991	"Together Forever"	-
1991	"A Day in My Life (Without You)"	-
1991	"Never Say Never"	-
1993	"Goody Goody"	Rosie Perez
1994	"Will You Ever Save Me"	-
1998	"Algo De Mi"	-

== See also ==
- List of Puerto Ricans
- Nuyorican
- Puerto Ricans in New York City
