= Together Forever (Lisette Melendez song) =

Single by Lisette Melendez

from the album Together Forever
- Released: January 1991
- Recorded: 1989
- Genre: Freestyle
- Length: 5:59 (album version)
- Label: Fever; Columbia
- Songwriters: Carlos Berrios; Franc Reyes; Frank Malave
- Producers: Carlos "After Dark" Berrios and Frankie Cutlass

Lisette Melendez singles chronology
| "If You Truly Love Me" (1990) | "Together Forever" (1991) | "A Day in My Life (Without You)" (1991) |

"Together Forever" is a song performed and recorded by American singer Lisette Melendez and written by Carlos Berrios, Franc Reyes and Frank Malave in 1991. It was initially released as a 12-inch vinyl record and primarily used in dance clubs. It was later included on Melendez's 1991 album Together Forever.

On February 16, 1991, the single reached position 31 on the Billboard Dance Club Songs chart and remained there for a total of nine weeks. On April 6, 1991, Melendez made it to the Billboard Hot 100, peaking at number 35. The single was one of the last freestyle songs to reach the Top 40 of the Billboard Hot 100. "Together Forever" is also credited as one of the few songs released in the 1990s that aided the revival of the "freestyle" genre's popularity, after the emergence of grunge.

The song was produced by Carlos "After Dark" Berrios, who also produced the 1991 song "Temptation" by Corina and Frankie Cutlass. This often explains the similarities in the two songs.

In 2008, the music video of the song was satirized by Marcos Mion on MTV.

In June 2020, Slant Magazine ranked "Together Forever" number 97 in their list of The 100 Best Dance Songs of All Time.

== Track listing ==
| Number | Title | Duration (min:sec) |
|---|---|---|
| 1 | New School Freestyle | 6:14 |
| 2 | New School Dub | 5:15 |
| 3 | Something for the Red Zone | 5:27 |
| 4 | Something for Roseland | 5:11 |
| 5 | Berrios Beats | 2:19 |
| 6 | Radio Edit | 3:49 |

== Chart performance ==
| Chart (1991) | Peak position |
|---|---|
| Australia (ARIA) | 106 |
| Billboard Hot 100 | 35 |
| Billboard Dance Club Songs | 31 |
| Billboard Dance/Electronic Singles Sales | 12 |
