= True to Life (Lisette Melendez album) =

True To Life

Studio album by Lisette Melendez
- Released: 1994
- Genre: hip-hop, R&B
- Label: Def Jam Recordings

Lisette Melendez chronology
Together Forever (1991)	True To Life (1994)	Imagination (1998)

Professional ratings
Review scores
Source	Rating
AllMusic	2.5/5 stars
Billboard	(favorable)

True to Life is Lisette Melendez' second studio album and was released in 1994 by Def Jam. Melendez' hit single "Goody Goody" from this album was extremely popular in Japan.

== Track listing ==
No.	Title	Length
1.	"Will You Ever Save Me"	5:05
2.	"How 'Bout You"	4:40
3.	"Love Type Situation"	4:42
4.	"Honestly"	4:31
5.	"Going My Way"	4:45
6.	"Goody Goody"	5:15
7.	"My Warning (Take This Love and Run)"	4:18
8.	"Love Me Need Me"	4:48
9.	"On Again Off Again"	4:44
10.	"I Know That You Know"	4:28
11.	"Love Type Situation Reprise (Abrazame)"	4:23
12.	"Goody Goody" (Hip Hop Mix)	5:41
