= Juelz Santana discography =

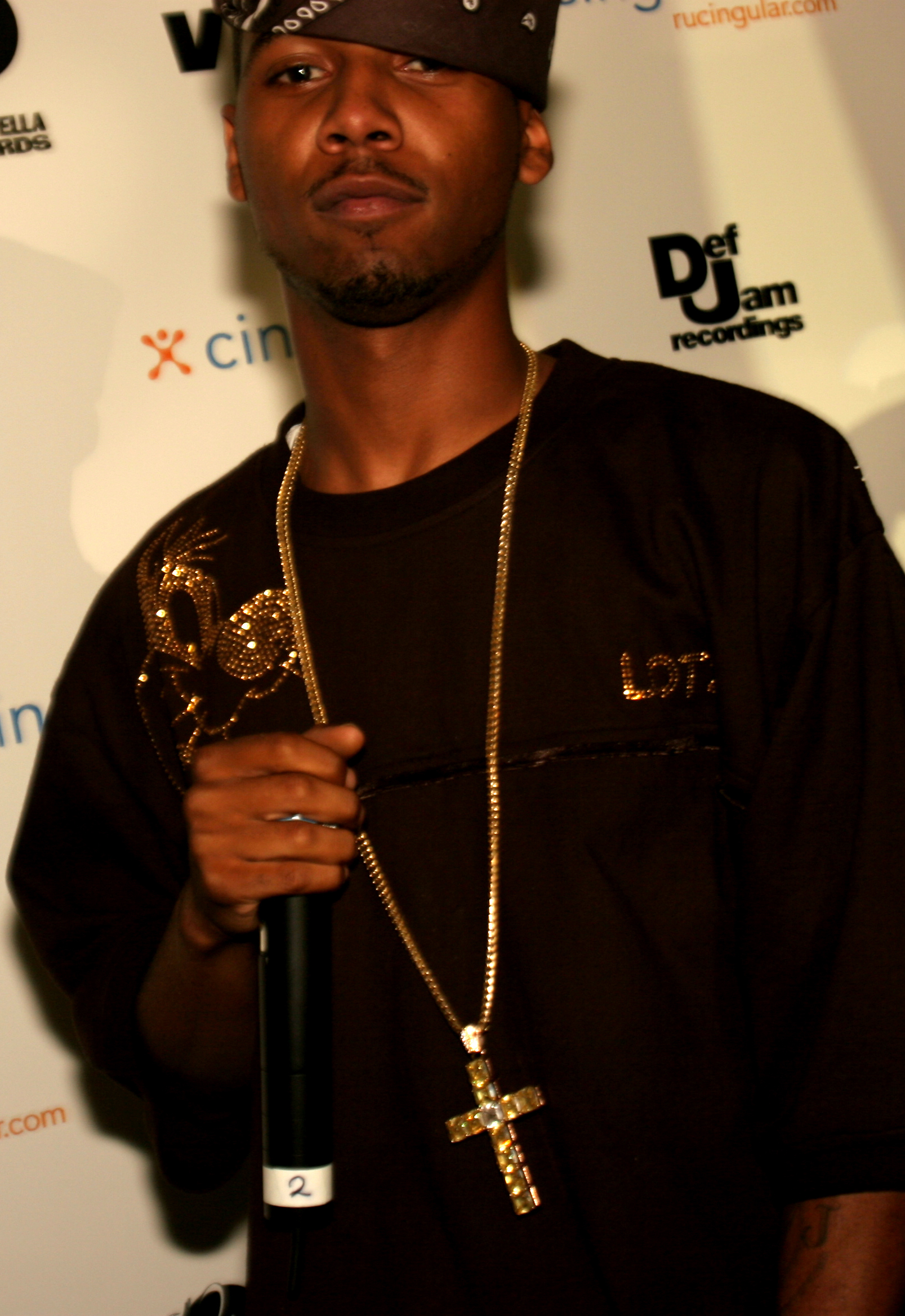
- Santana in 2005
- Studio albums: 2
- Compilation albums: 1
- Singles: 22
- Mixtapes: 6
- Promotional singles: 1

The discography of American rapper Juelz Santana consists of two studio albums, one compilation album, seven mixtapes, and 22 singles.

== Albums ==
=== Studio albums ===
List of albums, with selected chart positions and certifications
Title	Album details	Peak chart positions			Certifications
Title	Album details	US	US R&B	US Rap	Certifications
From Me to U	Released: August 19, 2003; Label: Diplomat, Roc-A-Fella, Def Jam; Format: CD, LP, cassette, digital download	8	3	*	
What the Game's Been Missing!	Released: November 22, 2005; Label: Diplomat, Def Jam; Format: CD, LP, digital download	9	1	1	RIAA: Gold
The Last Lap	Scheduled: 2026; Label: Skull Gang, I Can't Feel My Face, ONErpm	To be released			
"—" denotes a recording that did not chart.

=== Compilation albums ===
List of albums, with selected chart positions
Title	Album details	Peak chart positions
Title	Album details	US R&B
Back Like Cooked Crack, Pts. 1 & 2	Released: June 14, 2005; Label: Diplomat, Roc-A-Fella, Def Jam; Format: CD, digital download	68

=== Miscellaneous ===
List of miscellaneous albums, with selected information
Title	Album details	Notes
Born to Lose, Built to Win	Releases: Unknown; Label: Skull Gang, Diplomat, Def Jam	

== Mixtapes ==
List of mixtapes, with year released
Title	Album details
Final Destination	Released: June 17, 2003; Label: Diplomat; Format: CD, Digital download
Back Like Cooked Crack, Pt. 3: Fiend Out	Released: October 2005; Label: Dynasty; Format: CD, Digital download
The Takeover (with Skull Gang)	Released: September 19, 2008; Label: Skull Gang Entertainment; Format: Digital download
God Will'n	Released: January 14, 2013; Label: Skull Gang Entertainment; Format: Digital download
#FreeSantana	Released: March 3, 2020; Label: The Dispensary; Format: Digital download

== Singles ==
=== As lead artist ===
List of singles, with selected chart positions and certifications, showing year released and album name
Title	Year	Peak chart positions										Certifications	Album
Title	Year	US	US Pop	US R&B	US Rap	AUS	FIN	GER	IRE	NZ	UK	Certifications	Album
"Dipset (Santana's Town)" (featuring Cam'ron)	2003	—	—	70	—	—	—	—	—	—	—		From Me to U
"Down"	2003	—	—	—	—	—	—	—	—	—	—		From Me to U
"Mic Check"	2004	—	—	76	—	—	—	—	—	—	—		What the Game's Been Missing!
"There It Go (The Whistle Song)"	2005	6	13	8	3	33	7	72	46	29	47	RIAA: Platinum	What the Game's Been Missing!
"Oh Yes"	2006	56	—	15	8	—	—	—	—	—	—		What the Game's Been Missing!
"Clockwork"	2006	—	—	68	—	—	—	—	—	—	—		What the Game's Been Missing!
"The Second Coming" (with Just Blaze)	2007	— (Note: "The Second Coming" did not enter the Billboard Hot 100, but peaked at number one on the Bubbling Under Hot 100 Singles chart.)	—	—	—	—	—	—	—	—	—		Born to Lose, Built to Win
"Mixin' Up the Medicine" (featuring Yelawolf)	2009	—	—	—	—	—	—	—	—	—	—		Born to Lose, Built to Win
"Back to the Crib" (featuring Chris Brown)	2009	— (Note: "Back to the Crib" did not enter the Billboard Hot 100, but peaked at number 24 on the Bubbling Under Hot 100 Singles chart.)	—	60	23	—	—	—	—	—	—		Born to Lose, Built to Win
"Time Ticking" (with Dave East, featuring Bobby Shmurda and Rowdy Rebel)	2016	—	—	—	—	—	—	—	—	—	—		Non-album single
"—" denotes a recording that did not chart or was not released in that territory.

=== As featured artist ===
List of singles, with selected chart positions and certifications, showing year released and album name
Title	Year	Peak chart positions										Certifications	Album
Title	Year	US	US R&B	US Rap	AUS	FRA	GER	IRE	NZ	SWI	UK	Certifications	Album
"Oh Boy" (Cam'ron featuring Juelz Santana)	2002	4	1	1	—	—	70	—	50	—	13	BPI: Silver	Come Home with Me
"Welcome to New York City" (Cam'ron featuring Jay-Z and Juelz Santana)	2002	—	55	—	—	—	—	—	—	—	—		Come Home with Me
"Hey Ma" (Cam'ron featuring Juelz Santana)	2002	3	7	4	29	55	58	12	15	81	8	RIAA: Platinum; BPI: Silver	Come Home with Me
"Crunk Muzik" (Jim Jones featuring Cam'ron and Juelz Santana)	2004	—	84	—	—	—	—	—	—	—	—		On My Way to Church
"Run It!" (Chris Brown featuring Juelz Santana)	2005	1	1	—	1	19	5	2	1	5	2	RIAA: 5× Platinum; RIAA: Platinum (Mastertone); ARIA: 3× Platinum; BPI: Platinum; IFPI NOR: Gold; MC: Gold (Ringtone); PMB: Platinum	Chris Brown
"It's LL and Santana" (LL Cool J featuring Juelz Santana)	2006	—	—	—	—	—	—	—	—	—	—		Todd Smith
"Emotionless" (Jim Jones featuring Juelz Santana)	2007	—	91	—	—	—	—	—	—	—	—		Hustler's P.O.M.E. (Product of My Environment)
"Love Tonite (Going Down Like mmm?)" (Ana Bettz featuring Juelz Santana)	2007	—	—	—	—	—	—	—	—	—	—		Non-album single
"Curious" (Danny Fernandes featuring Juelz Santana)	2008	—	—	—	—	—	—	—	—	—	—		Intro
"Splash" (Jim Jones and ByrdGang featuring Juelz Santana, NOE, and Chink Santana)	2008	—	—	—	—	—	—	—	—	—	—		M.O.B.: The Album
"There's Nothin" (Sean Kingston featuring The D.E.Y. and Juelz Santana)	2008	60	63	—	—	—	—	—	—	—	—		Sean Kingston
"Let Me Show You" (Boxie featuring Juelz Santana)	2008	—	84	—	—	—	—	—	—	—	—		Non-album single
"Pop Champagne" (Jim Jones and Ron Browz featuring Juelz Santana)	2008	22	3	3	—	—	—	—	—	—	—	RIAA: Gold	Pray IV Reign
"Dancin on Me" (Webstar and Jim Jones featuring Juelz Santana)	2009	— (Note: "Dancin on Me" did not enter the Billboard Hot 100, but peaked at number four on the Bubbling Under Hot 100 Singles chart.)	45	19	—	—	—	—	—	—	—		The Rooftop
"Beamer, Benz, or Bentley" (Lloyd Banks featuring Juelz Santana)	2010	49	19	5	—	—	—	—	—	—	—	RIAA: Gold	H.F.M. 2 (Hunger for More 2)
"Oh Yeah" (Cam'ron featuring Juelz Santana)	2016	—	—	—	—	—	—	—	—	—	—		Killa Season 2
"—" denotes a recording that did not chart or was not released in that territory.

=== Promotional singles ===
List of singles, with selected chart positions, showing year released and album name
Title	Year	Peak chart positions		Album
Title	Year	US	CAN	Album
"You Ain't Got Nuthin" (Lil Wayne featuring Juelz Santana and Fabolous)	2008	81	81	Tha Carter III

== Guest appearances ==
List of non-single guest appearances, with other performing artists, showing year released and album name
Title	Year	Other performer(s)	Album
"Double Up"	2000	Cam'ron	S.D.E.
"All the Chickens"	2000	Cam'ron	S.D.E.
"Losing Weight, Pt. 2"	2002	Cam'ron	Come Home with Me
"Come Home with Me"	2002	Cam'ron, Jim Jones	Come Home with Me
"I Just Wanna"	2002	Cam'ron	Come Home with Me
"Only One Way Up"	2004	Jim Jones, Cam'ron	On My Way to Church
"Jamaican Joint"	2004	Jim Jones, Cam'ron	On My Way to Church
"This Is Gangsta"	2004	Jim Jones, Bezel	On My Way to Church
"Honey Dip"	2005	Jim Jones, J.R. Writer, Latif	Harlem: Diary of a Summer
"Ride wit Me"	2005	Jim Jones	Harlem: Diary of a Summer
"Welcome to the Concrete Jungle"	2006	Lil Wayne	Dedication 2
"No Other"	2006	Lil Wayne	Dedication 2
"Pin the Tail"	2006	Jim Jones, Cam'ron, Max B	Hustler's P.O.M.E. (Product of My Environment)
"Love Tonite"	2006	Ana Bettz	—N/a
"Black Republicans"	2007	Lil Wayne	Da Drought 3
"Daddy Back"	2007	Freekey Zekey, Cam'ron	Book of Ezekiel
"Killem Killem"	2007	Freekey Zekey	Book of Ezekiel
"She Got a Friend"	2009	Gucci Mane, Big Boi	The State vs. Radric Davis
"Mixin' Up The Medicine" (Remix)	2010	Yelawolf	Trunk Muzik
"Colors"	2011	Yo Gotti, Gucci Mane	January 10 (The Mixtape)
"My Hood"	2011	Cassidy, Jim Jones	Monster Mondays Vol. 1
"Salute"	2011	Jim Jones, Cam'ron	Capo
"Hockey Bag"	2011	Jim Jones, Cam'ron	Capo
"Time Is Up"	2011	DJ Haze, Fred the Godson, Jim Jones	—N/a
"Drank in My Cup" (Remix)	2012	Kirko Bangz, 2 Chainz	—N/a
"Supermodel"	2012	CashFlow, D Ellis	The Enterprise
"YOLO"	2012	Erreon Lee	—N/a
"Pain"	2012	Trav, Bucksy Luciano	Push
"My Ho 2" (Remix)	2012	Future	—N/a
"Rollie on My Wrist"	2012	Fredo Santana	Fredo Kruger
"YSL Cheetah"	2013	Future	—N/a
"Usher Raymond"	2013	Fly-Ty, Cap1, Lil Durk	—N/a
"Just Another Day"	2013	Funkmaster Flex, Stori	Who You Mad At? Me Or Yourself?
"Hell Yeah"	2013	August Alsina	The Product 2
"Rich Friday"	2013	DJ Clue, Future, Nicki Minaj, French Montana	—N/a
"Benjamins"	2014	Big Lean	Enough is Enough
"Love Kills"	2015	Belly	Up For Days
"All Said & Done"	2017	Statik Selektah, Plays	8

== Music videos ==
List of music videos, with directors, showing year released
Title	Year	Director(s)
"Dipset (Santana's Town)" (featuring Cam'ron)	2003	—N/a
"Rain Drops"	2003	Jimmy Jones
"Oh Yes"	2005	—N/a
"Mic Check"	2005	Juelz Santana
"There It Go (The Whistle Song)"	2005	—N/a
"Clockwork"	2006	Dale Resteghini
"Shottas"	2006	—N/a
"Make It Work for You" (featuring Young Jeezy and Lil Wayne)	2006	—N/a
"Days of Our Lives"	2009	Todd Wiseman
"Mixin' Up The Medicine" (featuring Yelawolf)	2009	Rik Cordero
"Back to the Crib" (featuring Chris Brown)	2009	Clifton Bell
"Home Run" (featuring Lil Wayne)	2011	James Del Gatto
"Bodies" (featuring Lil Reese)	2013	Prime Cut
"Nobody Knows" (featuring Future)	2013	Prime Cut
"Awesome" (featuring Wale)	2013	Prime Cut
"Everything Is Good" (featuring Wiz Khalifa and Bucksy Luciano)	2013	Propa TV
"Ol Thang Back"	2016	Cloudkickapiff

== See also ==
- The Diplomats discography
- Skull Gang discography
