= Mike Epps: Only One Mike =

- Directed by: Kevin Bray
- Starring: Mike Epps
- Distributed by: Netflix
- Release date: June 25, 2019
- Running time: 63 minutes
- Country: United States
- Language: English

Mike Epps: Only One Mike is a 2019 Netflix stand-up comedy special by American comic Mike Epps, directed by Kevin Bray. It is Epps' second Netflix stand-up special, following Mike Epps: Don't Take it Personal (2015).

The special was filmed on November 3, 2018, at DAR Constitution Hall in Washington, D.C. Epps discusses sexual misconduct, special education and aging. It was released on June 25, 2019, on Netflix streaming.
