= A Tribute to Bad Santa Starring Mike Epps =

Jim Jones & Skull Gang Present A Tribute to Bad Santa Starring Mike Epps

Compilation album by Jim Jones & Skull Gang
- Released: November 25, 2008
- Recorded: 2008
- Genres: Hip hop, Christmas music
- Labels: BG; Skull Gang; 730 Dips; Asti; Koch
- Producers: Jim Jones (co-exec.), Juelz Santana (co-exec.), Chink Santana (co-exec.), Freekey Zekey (co-exec.), Bei Maejor, Street Scott, TAGMG

Jim Jones chronology
Harlem's American Gangster (2008)	Jim Jones & Skull Gang Present A Tribute To Bad Santa Starring Mike Epps (2008)	Pray IV Reign: The Mixtape (2009)

Skull Gang chronology
Jim Jones & Skull Gang Present A Tribute To Bad Santa Starring Mike Epps (2008)	Skull Gang (2009)

Jim Jones & Skull Gang Present A Tribute to Bad Santa Starring Mike Epps is a Christmas-themed hip hop compilation album by American rapper Jim Jones and hip hop collective Skull Gang. The album was released on November 25, 2008, by ByrdGang Records, Skull Gang Entertainment, 730 Dips Records, Asti, and Koch Records. The album features guest appearances from members of Dipset and ByrdGang, respectively.

== Background ==
In February 2009, Deonta Cummings filed a lawsuit against Jim Jones and E1 Records (formerly Koch) alleging that his artist, Ivory Keys, was not given proper compensation or credit for his contribution to the album.

== Track listing ==
No.	Title	Length
1.	"Intro" (featuring Jim Jones, Sen and Shoota)	3:13
2.	"Mike Epps Skit #1" (featuring Mike Epps)	0:45
3.	"Christmas Eve" (featuring Jim Jones, Tom Gist and NOE)	3:06
4.	"Christmas In The Ghetto" (featuring Juelz Santana, Starr and RAB)	3:52
5.	"Baby Keep It Here" (featuring Sen, Freekey Zekey, Chink Santana and Tom Gist)	3:55
6.	"Mike Epps Skit #2"	0:15
7.	"Christmas Like This" (featuring Riz, Shoota and Mel Matrix)	4:23
8.	"Christmas Song" (featuring Skull Gang)	2:34
9.	"All the Things Skit" (featuring Mike Epps)	0:24
10.	"All the Things I Want" (featuring Sen, NOE and Freekey Zekey)	4:22
11.	"Jingle Bellz" (featuring Starr and Juelz Santana)	3:42
12.	"Mike Epps Skit # 4" (featuring Mike Epps)	1:08
13.	"Better Not Cry" (featuring Shoota, Tom Gist, Red and NOE)	5:02
14.	"On the First Day" (featuring Freekey Zekey, Sen and Shoota)	2:59
15.	"Merry Christmas" (featuring Skull Gang and Roger Dat)	2:58
16.	"12 Days Of Christmas" (featuring Riz, NOE, Jetlag Ash and John Famous)	4:38
17.	"Byrdgang Christmas" (featuring Black, Shoota and Sandman)	4:54
18.	"Gotta Get That" (featuring Shoota, Tom Gist and Hard Luck)	3:42
19.	"It's Christmas Time" (featuring Mel Matrix, Jim Jones, Sandman and Esso)	4:03
