= Mike Epps =

American actor and comedian (born 1970)

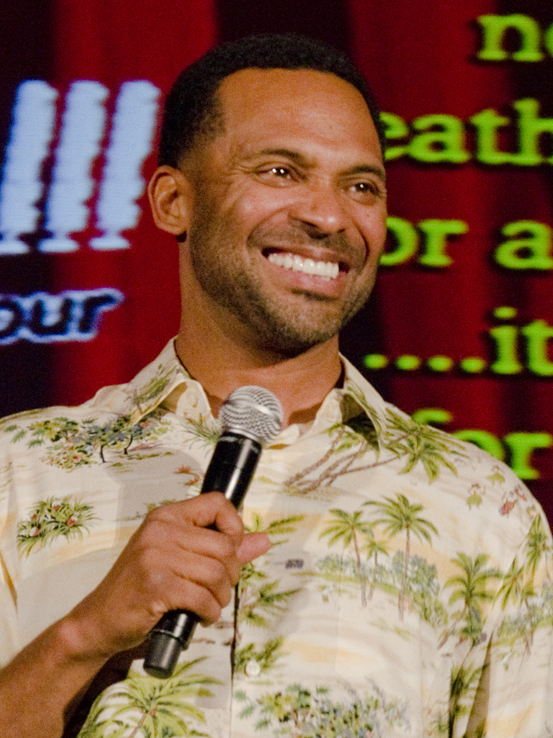
- Epps in 2013
- Born: Michael Elliot Epps; November 18, 1970 (age 55); Indianapolis, Indiana, U.S.
- Spouse: Mechelle McCain (m. 2006; div. 2017) Kyra Robinson (m. 2019)
- Children: 7

Comedy career
- Years active: 1994–present
- Medium: Stand-up; film; television
- Genres: Observational comedy; satire
- Website: www.mikeepps.com

Michael Elliot Epps (born November 18, 1970) is an American stand-up comedian and actor. He played Day-Day Jones in Next Friday and its sequel, Friday After Next, and also appeared in The Hangover and The Hangover Part III as "Black Doug".

He was the voice of main character Boog in Open Season 2, replacing Martin Lawrence, with whom he starred in the comedy Welcome Home Roscoe Jenkins, playing "Reggie", cousin of Roscoe (played by Lawrence). He played Lloyd Jefferson "L.J." Wayne in the Resident Evil films (2004–2007) and O'Neil in the Sony's Spider-Man Universe film Madame Web (2024). He has had starring roles in the sitcoms Uncle Buck and The Upshaws.

== Early life ==
Epps was born and raised in Indianapolis, the son of Mary Reed and Tommie Epps. In his adulthood, Epps moved to Brooklyn to star in Def Comedy Jam in 1994.

== Career ==
=== Stand-up comedy ===
Epps began his professional career by joining the Def Comedy Jam tour in 1995 and starred in two of HBO's Def Comedy Jam broadcasts.

=== Acting ===
Epps' first on-screen appearance came in Vin Diesel's second directorial film, Strays in 1997. In 1999, Epps was then cast as Ice Cube's co-star in the sequel, Next Friday. This followed weeks of auditions, after Ice Cube attended a stand-up set Epps did, and then asked Epps to try out for the role of Day-Day Jones. Later that year, Epps had a cameo in 3 Strikes, and supported Jamie Foxx in Bait.

Epps had a voice role in the 2001 film Dr. Dolittle 2 as Sonny the Bear and finished the year with a featured role as comical pimp Baby Powder in How High, starring Method Man and Redman. Epps reunited with Ice Cube in 2002 as the bumbling thief to Ice Cube's bounty hunter in All About the Benjamins, and again re-teamed with Cube in Friday's second sequel Friday After Next. He played Lloyd Jefferson "L.J." Wayne in the films Resident Evil: Apocalypse (2004) and Resident Evil: Extinction (2007). Epps also voiced another bear character (Boog) in the 2008 film Open Season 2 after Martin Lawrence declined the role; he previously worked with Lawrence in the comedy Welcome Home Roscoe Jenkins (2008), playing "Reggie", cousin of Roscoe (played by Lawrence). He played "Black Doug" in The Hangover (2009) and The Hangover Part III (2013). In 2010, Epps also released a stand-up comedy special, Under Rated & Never Faded, and hosted the 2010 BET Hip Hop Awards.

Epps starred alongside Jordin Sparks and Whitney Houston in the 2012 remake of Sparkle, in his first non-comedic role as the main antagonist, Satin, a stand-up comic by day, an evil and abusive drug kingpin by night, who is engaged in an affair with the titular character's sister. Epps' performance was well received by critics and audiences. In 2014, Epps landed the coveted role of Richard Pryor in a planned Pryor biopic to be directed by Lee Daniels; however, the project has remained in development hell. Epps did portray Pryor in the 2016 Nina Simone biopic Nina and in an episode of the HBO drama series Winning Time about the L.A. Lakers.

Epps had a starring role in the 2016 comedy horror film Meet the Blacks and its 2021 sequel The House Next Door: Meet the Blacks 2. He also starred as the title character in the single-season 2016 sitcom Uncle Buck. Since 2021, he has been a main cast member on the Netflix sitcom The Upshaws.

=== Music ===
Epps "hosted" the Jim Jones and Skull Gang album Jim Jones & Skull Gang Present A Tribute To Bad Santa Starring Mike Epps. Epps has also made a song called "Trying to Be a Gangsta" with Pooh Bear.

Epps also hosted G-Unit's 2008 mixtape Elephant in the Sand, appearing on the track "Hollow Thru Him". Epps also has a song called "Big Girls", which came out in 2008. It was originally recorded by Bow Wow featuring Yung Joc. The song is currently on iTunes and can be found on his album, Funny Bidness: Da Album, which was released October 27, 2009. Epps also has featured in rapper French Montana's Mac Wit Da Cheese mixtape, which was released on April 19, 2009. Epps has also featured on the Dom Kennedy song "Intro/Hard Work" on his FutureStreet/DrugSounds mixtape.

Part of his stand-up comedy in Under Rated & Never Faded was sampled for the song "I'm On Everything" by Bad Meets Evil on their first EP, Hell: The Sequel and on the track "Runaway", from J. Cole's second album Born Sinner. Mike Epps was also known in his hometown of Indianapolis as the CEO of Naptown Records. In 2006 he signed local artist Philthyphil. This artist had just been released from prison after serving three years for a drug indictment in which he was the suspected distributor of large amounts of narcotics. The record deal which was reportedly worth $175,000 was later terminated after Phillip "Philthyphil" White was charged with first-degree murder in Oakland, CA in 2007.

Epps has made cameo appearances in many music videos, mostly by hip hop artists, including "Gangsta Nation" (2003) by Westside Connection, "A Bay Bay" (2007) by Hurricane Chris, "No Effort" (2017) by Tee Grizzley, and "Bank Account" (2017) by 21 Savage.

=== Super Bowl XLVI ===
Epps served as the "Super Bowl ambassador" in his native Indianapolis for the 2012 Super Bowl. He was featured in commercials promoting the Super Bowl Village and he made special appearances in the Village during the week of the Super Bowl.

== Controversies ==
Epps has been criticized by disability campaigners for mocking physically and mentally disabled children in his stand-up act.

On June 1, 2014, Epps purportedly assaulted fellow stand-up comedian LaVar Walker outside of the Uptown Comedy Club. It was stated Epps and two of his bodyguards did this in response to Walker making a parody video about Epps and comedian Kevin Hart. Epps allegedly struck him in the face and kicked him in the stomach and back, while one of the other two men threw the victim's cellphone and crushed his prescription glasses. Atlanta Police issued a warrant for Epps' arrest two days later on June 3.

Around mid-2017, Epps received controversy for bringing a kangaroo onto the stage during one of his shows. Many noted the animal looked distressed, with Epps grabbing and holding it against its will. Epps later apologized, saying it was completely unscripted and that he should have never hurt an animal.

== Personal life ==
Epps married to Mechelle McCain in July 2006. The pair lived in Beverly Hills, California until divorcing in September 2017. Epps married OWN Network executive and Iyanla: Fix My Life producer Kyra Robinson, in Newport Beach, California, in June 2019.

== Filmography ==
=== Film ===
Year	Title	Role	Notes
1996	Vera's Initiation	Simon	Short
1997	Strays	Mike	
1999	Shelly Fisher	Esquire Jones	TV movie
2000	Next Friday	'Day-Day' Jones	
2000	3 Strikes	Crackhead	
2000	Bait	Stevie Sanders	
2001	Dr. Dolittle 2	Sonny (voice)	
2001	How High	Baby Powder	
2002	All About the Benjamins	Reginald Wright	
2002	Friday After Next	Day-Day/Old Man with Shotgun	
2003	Malibu's Most Wanted	Rap-Battle Host	Uncredited
2003	The Fighting Temptations	Lucius	
2004	Resident Evil: Apocalypse	Lloyd Jefferson 'L.J.' Wade	
2005	Letter to the President	Himself	Video
2005	Guess Who	The Cab Driver	
2005	The Honeymooners	Ed Norton	
2005	Roll Bounce	Byron	
2006	Something New	Walter	
2007	Talk to Me	Milo Hughes	
2007	Resident Evil: Extinction	Lloyd Jefferson 'L.J.' Wade	
2008	Welcome Home Roscoe Jenkins	Reggie Jenkins	
2008	Hancock	Criminal	Uncredited Cameo; Post-Credits Scene
2008	The Grand	Reggie Marshall	
2008	The Adventures of Tha Blue Carpet Treatment	Himself (voice)	Video
2008	Open Season 2	Boog (voice)	
2008	Soul Men	Duane Henderson	
2009	Next Day Air	Brody	
2009	The Hangover	'Black Doug'	
2009	Janky Promoters	Jellyroll	
2010	Love Chronicles: Secrets Revealed	Black	Video
2010	Lottery Ticket	Reverend Taylor	
2010	Ghetto Stories	Lawn Service Worker	
2010	Faster	Roy Grone	
2011	Jumping the Broom	Willie Earl	
2011	35 and Ticking	Harold	
2012	Mac & Devin Go to High School	Boyce Armstrong	
2012	Sparkle	'Satin' Struthers	
2013	Repentance	Ben Carter	
2013	The Hangover Part III	'Black Doug'	
2014	School Dance	Principal Jimmy Rodgers	
2015	Bessie	Richard	TV movie
2015	Stealing Cars	Sheriff Emmit Till	
2016	Fifty Shades of Black	Ron	
2016	Meet the Blacks	Carl Black	
2016	Nina	Richard Pryor	
2016	Term Life	Darryl Mosley	
2016	What Are the Chances?	Next Door Neighbor	
2017	Girls Trip	Absinthe Dealer	
2017	Where's the Money	Dre	
2018	Uncle Drew	Louis	
2018	Acts of Violence	Max Livington	
2018	Love Jacked	Rufus	
2018	Death Wish	Dr. Chris Salgado	Uncredited
2018	Supercon	Gil Burkhaulter	
2018	Don't Get Caught	Next Door Neighbor	Video
2019	The Last Black Man in San Francisco	Bobby	
2019	Troop Zero	Dwayne Boudraux	
2019	The Trap	Dutch	
2019	How High 2	Baby Powder	TV movie
2019	Every StoryTime Animation	DimDom (voice)	Short
2019	The Cat and the Moon	Cal	
2019	Dolemite Is My Name	Jimmy	
2020	A Compton Story	Narrator	Short
2021	The House Next Door: Meet the Blacks 2	Carl Black	
2022	On the Come Up	DJ Hype	
2023	You People	Uncle EJ	
2023	Young. Wild. Free.	Lamont	
2024	The Underdoggs	Kareem	
2024	Madame Web	O'Neil	
2025	Trouble Man	Ree Ree	
2026	72 Hours	Officer Williard	

=== Television ===
Year	Title	Role	Notes
1995	Def Comedy Jam	Himself	Episode: "Episode #5.9"
1999	The Sopranos	Jerome	Episode: "46 Long"
2004	Def Poetry Jam	Himself	Episode: "Episode #4.7"
2004	Judge Mooney	Dion	TV series
2005	It's the Shoes	Himself	Episode: "Quentin Richardson and Mike Epps"
2006	Def Comedy Jam	Himself/Host	Main Host
2006	The Boondocks	Moe "Mo Gunz" Jackson (voice)	Episode: "Wingmen"
2007	100 Greatest Songs of the 90s	Himself	Main Guest
2009	World's Dumbest	Himself	Episode: "Drivers 12"
2009–2012	BET Hip Hop Awards	Himself/Host	Main Host
2010	Funk Flex Full Throttle	Himself	Episode: "Episode #1.2"
2014	Ridiculouness	Himself	Episode: "Mike Epps"
2014	Real Husbands of Hollywood	Himself	Episode: "A Blurred 47 1/2 Hours"
2014–2016	Survivor's Remorse	Uncle Julius	Main cast: Season 1–2; recurring cast: Season 3
2015	That's Racist with Mike Epps	Himself/Host	Main Host
2016	Uncle Buck	Buck Russell	Main cast
2017	All Def Movie Awards	Himself/Host	Main Host
2017	Hollywood Game Night	Himself/Celebrity Player	Episode: "Keep It Unreal"
2017	Hip Hop Squares	Himself/Center Square	Episode: "Kent Jones vs. Nick Young"
2017	Star	Jay Holland	Episode: "The Winner Takes it All"
2018–2022	Mokey's Show	Sucks (voice)	Recurring cast: Season 4, Guest: Season 5
2020	You Ain't Got These	Himself	Episode: "Intro"
2020	This Is Stand-Up	Himself	Episode: "Episode #1.2"
2020	Stumptown	Antonio Price	Episode: "Reality Checks Don't Bounce"
2020	BlackAF	Uncle Ray	Episode: "yo, between you and me... this is because of slavery"
2020–2024	Xploshi Entertainment Shorts	Various Roles (voice)	Recurring cast: Season 2, Guest: Season 3-4 & 6
2021	Superstar	Himself	Episode: "Richard Pryor"
2021–2026	The Upshaws	Bennie Upshaw	Main cast
2022	Winning Time: The Rise of the Lakers Dynasty	Richard Pryor	Episode: "Pieces of a Man"
2023	I'm a Virgo	Martisse	Recurring cast
2024	ComicView	Himself/Host	Episode: "DC Young Fly & Tony Roberts"
2024	The Equalizer	J.J. Cranson	Episode: "All Bets Are Off"

=== Video games ===
Year	Title	Role
2017	Cat Quest	Teddy Bear (voice)
2019	Cat Quest II	Teddy Bear (voice)
2024	Cat Quest III	Teddy Bear (voice)

=== Comedy specials ===
Year	Title	Notes
2006	Mike Epps: Inappropriate Behavior	
2009	Mike Epps: Under Rated... Never Faded & X-Rated	
2015	Mike Epps: Don't Take It Personal	Netflix
2019	Mike Epps: Only One Mike	Netflix
2022	Mike Epps: Indiana Mike	Netflix
2024	Mike Epps: Ready to Sell Out	Netflix
2026	Mike Epps: Delusional	

=== Music videos ===
Year	Song	Artist
2002	"How Come You Don't Call Me"	Alicia Keys
2002	"Nothin'"	NORE
2002	"Whatchulookinat"	Whitney Houston
2003	"Gangsta Nation"	Westside Connection
2004	"Never Forget"	Napoleon
2005	"ASAP"	T.I.
2006	"What You Know"	T.I.
2006	"Why We Thugs"	Ice Cube
2007	"Ay Bay Bay"	Hurricane Chris
2007	"Baby"	Angie Stone featuring Betty Wright
2008	"I'm Lit"	Square Off
2009	"I Don't Know Y'all"	Young Dro
2011	"Mrs. Right"	Mindless Behavior featuring Diggy Simmons
2011	"I'm on Everything"	Bad Meets Evil
2013	"Bitch, Don't Kill My Vibe"	Kendrick Lamar
2014	"No Flex Zone!"	Rae Sremmurd
2015	"Ayo"	Chris Brown and Tyga
2017	"No Effort"	Tee Grizzley
2017	"Bank Account"	21 Savage
2019	"I'm on 3.0"	Trae tha Truth
2019	"Let Bygones Be Bygones"	Snoop Dogg
2024	"It's My Ego"	Ice Cube

=== Documentary ===
Year	Title
1998	Pimps Up, Ho's Down
2011	Phunny Business: A Black Comedy
2011	I Ain't Scared of You: A Tribute to Bernie Mac
2013	Richard Pryor: Omit the Logic
2015	Sneakerheadz
2016	Dying Laughing
2019	I Am Richard Pryor
2019	Napoleon: Life of an Outlaw

== Discography ==
Albums

- A Tribute to Bad Santa Starring Mike Epps (with Jim Jones and Skull Gang, 2008)
- Funny Bidness: Da Album (2009)
- Omar Ray Life & Timez of Suge Gotti, Vol. 1 (2012)

Singles

- "Big Girls" (2008)
- "Trying to Be a Gangsta" (2009)
- "Aint Chu You?" (2009)

Guest appearances

- 2009: "I'm a Go and Get My..." with (Busta Rhymes) on Back on My B.S.
- 2011: “I’m on Everything” with (Bad Meets Evil) on Hell: The Sequel
- 2016: "2011 BET Cypha" with (Termanology, French Montana, Wais P, Rico Staxx, & Cross) on Cameo King III
