= Toya (singer) =

American singer-songwriter (born 1983)

- Born: LaToya Lacole Rodriguez; July 22, 1983 (age 42)
- Origin: St. Louis, Missouri, U.S.
- Genres: R&B
- Occupations: Singer; songwriter
- Years active: 2000–2009
- Labels: Hit City; Arista

LaToya Lacole Martin (née Rodriguez; born July 22, 1983), also known mononymously as Toya, is an American former R&B singer from St. Louis, Missouri, best known for her 2001 song, "I Do!!", which reached number 16 on the US Billboard Hot 100.

== Early life and education ==
Toya was born LaToya Lacole Rodriguez on July 22, 1983, to a Puerto Rican father and an African American mother. She was named after La Toya Jackson. She graduated from Mary Institute and St. Louis Country Day School in St. Louis County, Missouri.

== Career ==
Toya’s career jump started when Courtney Benson and Tony Davis signed Toya to their production company, Hit City Music Group. The two also managed another St. Louis native, Hip Hop superstar Nelly. They took Toya to Arista Records, where then-label chief L.A. Reid signed her to a major record deal instantly. Toya’s first single "I Do!!" had major chart success. And led to her self-titled debut album later that same year, which landed on the Billboard 200. Her second single was 2002's "No Matta What (Party All Night)".

In January 2011, Toya announced via Twitter that she would like to record music again. In April 2013, she stated that she was attempting to record music again.

== Personal life ==
Toya is married to Tamaurice "Tee" Martin, who played in the NFL for the Pittsburgh Steelers and Oakland Raiders. On March 15, 2004, their son Kaden Martin was born. In 2012, Toya gave birth to a second child, another son Cannon, according to her via Twitter.

== Discography ==
=== Albums ===
| Title | Album details | Peak chart position |
| Title | Album details | US |
|---|---|---|
| Toya | Released August 7, 2001; Label: Arista; Format: CD, digital download | 109 |

=== Singles ===
| Year | Song | US | US Rhyth | US R&B | AUS | NZ | UK | Certifications | Album |
|---|---|---|---|---|---|---|---|---|---|
| 2001 | "I Do!!" | 16 | 8 | 25 | 12 | 9 | — | | Toya |
| 2002 | "No Matta What (Party All Night)" | 86 | 34 | — | 25 | — | — | | Toya |
| 2002 | "Hey Ma" (with Cam'ron, Freeky Zeeky and Juelz Santana) | 3 | 2 | 7 | 29 | 15 | 8 | BPI: Silver; RIAA: Platinum | Come Home with Me |

=== Other appearances ===
| Title | Year | Other performer(s) | Album |
|---|---|---|---|
| "Stick Out Ya Wrist" | 2002 | Nelly | XXX |
| "Same Ol Dirty" | 2004 | Murphy Lee | Murphy's Law |
| "I Had a Dream" | 2006 | Terror Time | Hard Times in da Country |

== See also ==
- List of Afro-Latinos
