= Funny Bidness: Da Album =

Studio album by Mike Epps
- Released: October 27, 2009
- Recorded: 2008–2009
- Genre: Comedy hip hop, hip hop
- Length: 55:56
- Label: Naptown; Asti; E1
- Producer: Mike Epps (exec.), DJ Quik, D-Maq, Jane Minovskaya, Regena Ratcliffe, Scott Storch

Mike Epps chronology
A Tribute to Bad Santa Starring Mike Epps (2008)	Funny Bidness: Da Album (2009)

Singles from Funny Bidness: Da Album
- 1. "Big Girls" Released: November 11, 2008; 2. "Trying to Be a Gangsta" Released: May 19, 2009

Professional ratings
Review scores
Source	Rating
AllMusic	4/5 stars

Funny Bidness: Da Album is the debut studio album by American actor and comedian Mike Epps, released on October 27, 2009 by his label Naptown Records with distribution via E1 Music. The album has appearances by Young Dro, Slim Thug, Too Short, DJ Quik, Flo Rida, Snoop Dogg, Young Jeezy, among others.

The album debuted at No. 98 on the US Top R&B/Hip-Hop Albums chart and No. 9 on the Top Comedy Albums chart.

== Track listing ==
1. "Interview (Skit)" – 0:25
2. "Ain't Chu You" (featuring Young Dro, Nitti & Dorrough) – 4:37
3. "The Bitch Won't Leave Me Alone" – 4:03
4. "Trying to Be a Gangsta" – 2:54
5. "Church Pastor (Skit)" – 0:49
6. "I Da Pimp" (featuring Slim Thug & Too Short) – 3:39
7. "No Dial Tone" – 3:38
8. "Baby Makin' Nigga" (featuring Flo Rida) – 3:57
9. "Domestic Dispute" (featuring Snoop Dogg) – 6:03
10. "Young Prison Program (Skit)" – 0:55
11. "Burn Hollywood" – 4:07
12. "If I Left It at Home" (featuring Tyler Woods) – 4:12
13. "Big Girls" – 3:29
14. "Jail Call (Skit)" – 2:39
15. "Extra Gangsta" – 4:02
16. "I Love The Hoes" (featuring DJ Quik) – 2:54
17. "Gone Back to Indiana" – 4:29

== Charts ==
Chart (2009)	Peak position
US Top R&B/Hip-Hop Albums (Billboard)	98
US Top Comedy Albums (Billboard)	9
