= Hey Ma (Cam'ron song) =

2002 single by Cam'ron featuring Juelz Santana, Freekey Zekey, & Toya

Single by Cam'ron featuring Juelz Santana, Freekey Zekey and Toya

from the album Come Home with Me
- B-side: "Boy Boy"; "Live My Life (Leave Me Alone)"
- Released: August 6, 2002
- Genre: Hip hop, R&B
- Length: 3:40
- Label: Roc-A-Fella; Diplomat; Def Jam
- Songwriters: Cam'ron Giles, LaRon James, Darryl Pittman, Lionel Richie
- Producers: DR Period, Mafia Boy

Cam'ron singles chronology
"Oh Boy" (2002)	"Hey Ma" (2002)	"Daydreaming" (2002)

Toya singles chronology
"No Matta What (Party All Night)" (2002)	"Hey Ma" (2002)

"Hey Ma" is a song by American rapper Cam'ron, released through Cam'ron's Diplomat Records, Jay-Z's Roc-A-Fella Records and Def Jam Recordings as the second single from his third album Come Home with Me. The song features Juelz Santana, Freekey Zekey, and Toya, and was produced by DR Period and Mafia Boy, who used a sample of the Commodores' 1977 hit "Easy".

Released as the follow-up to Cam'ron's successful single "Oh Boy", "Hey Ma" followed that song's success, peaking at No. 3 on the Billboard Hot 100, his highest peak on that chart, while also reaching the top 10 on several other Billboard charts.

The remix also features Juelz Santana and Toya (excluding Freekey Zekey). This remix, produced by DR Period and Mafia Boy, was included on the Diplomats' first album, Diplomatic Immunity.

== In popular culture ==
The song was featured in the 2012 film End of Watch. The song can also be heard in "Lord of the Bling", an episode of the UPN/CW television series Veronica Mars.

== Music video ==
The music video for the song was filmed at the Love Nightclub in Washington, D.C. in July 2002, and depicts the members of the Diplomats inside the club except for Juelz Santana, who is refused entry as the bouncer (played by then Love part-owner Taz Wube) reads his ID and sees that he is 18, but has to be 21 to enter. Juelz then sees the rest of The Diplomats about to enter the club and through his connection to the group, Juelz is let in. Before Cam'ron's verse, Diplomats affiliate Frankie Krutches appears and dances while Cam'ron's Live My Life (Leave Me Alone) appears in the background. The video features cameo appearances from Jim Jones, Kareem "Biggs" Burke, and Damon Dash, as well as fellow Roc-A-Fella Records artists Beanie Sigel, Omillio Sparks, Young Gunz, Oschino Vasquez, and Freeway.

== Charts ==
=== Weekly charts ===
Chart (2002–2003)	Peak position
Australia (ARIA)	29
Australian Urban (ARIA)	10
Europe (European Hot 100 Singles)	22
France (SNEP)	55
Germany (GfK)	58
Ireland (IRMA)	12
Italy (FIMI)	43
New Zealand (Recorded Music NZ)	15
Scotland Singles (OCC)	13
Switzerland (Schweizer Hitparade)	81
UK Singles (OCC)	8
UK Hip Hop/R&B (OCC)	3
US Billboard Hot 100	3
US Hot R&B/Hip-Hop Songs (Billboard)	7
US Hot Rap Songs (Billboard)	4
US Pop Airplay (Billboard)	6
US Rhythmic Airplay (Billboard)	2

=== Year-end charts ===
Chart (2002)	Position
US Billboard Hot 100	53
US Billboard Hot R&B/Hip-Hop Singles & Tracks	57
US Billboard Hot Rap Singles	20

Chart (2003)	Position
Irish Singles Chart	99
UK Singles Chart	98

== Certifications ==
Region	Certification	Certified units/sales
United Kingdom (BPI)	Gold	400,000^{‡}
United States (RIAA)	Platinum	1,000,000^{‡}
^{‡} Sales+streaming figures based on certification alone.
