= Back to the Crib =

Single by Juelz Santana featuring Chris Brown

from the album Born to Lose, Built to Win
- Released: December 14, 2009
- Recorded: 2009
- Length: 4:24
- Label: Skull Gang; Diplomat; Def Jam
- Songwriter(s): LaRon James; Ester Dean; Karl Smith; Jamal Jones
- Producer(s): Polow da Don

Juelz Santana singles chronology
"Mixin' Up the Medicine" (2009)	"Back to the Crib" (2009)	"Beamer, Benz, or Bentley" (2010)

Chris Brown singles chronology
"Crawl" (2009)	"Back to the Crib" (2009)	"Deuces" (2010)

"Back to the Crib" is a song by American rapper Juelz Santana, intended as the second single for his unreleased third album Born to Lose, Built to Win. It features American singer-songwriter Chris Brown, marking their second collaboration following the latter's debut single "Run It!" in 2005. The song was produced by Polow da Don.

== Background ==
After Chris Brown's publicised abuse case with singer Rihanna, Def Jam president L.A. Reid wanted Trey Songz to perform the chorus instead of Brown; however, Juelz Santana stuck with keeping Brown's vocals for its final release.

== Music video ==
The music video directed by Clifton Bell was released December 14, 2009. Trav, Red Cafe, Tony Yayo, Lloyd Banks, DJ Envy, and Jim Jones appeared in the video. Popular models including his future wife Kimbella Vanderhee and Rosa Acosta also made appearances in the video.

== Charts ==
Chart (2010)	Peak position
US Bubbling Under Hot 100 (Billboard)	24
US Billboard Hot R&B/Hip-Hop Songs	60
US Billboard Rap Songs	23
