= God Will'n =

Mixtape by Juelz Santana
- Released: January 14, 2013
- Recorded: 2009–2012
- Genre: Hip hop
- Length: 65:30
- Label: Skull Gang Entertainment
- Producers: Juelz Santana (exec.); Automatik; Beat Butcha; Buda & Grandz; Dr. Freak; The Futuristiks; Gnyus; Jahlil Beats; Jokey; Kino Beats; Nonstop Da Hitman; Prime; Ronnie; Sha Money XL; Ty Real; Young Shun

Juelz Santana chronology
The Takeover (2008)	God Will'n (2013)	All We Got Is Us (2013)

Singles from God Will'n
- 1. "Bodies" Released: November 27, 2012; 2. "Soft" Released: January 8, 2013

God Will'n is the seventh mixtape by American rapper Juelz Santana, released on January 14, 2013. It is Santana's first solo project since 2005. The mixtape features guest appearances from Jadakiss, Rick Ross, Meek Mill, Fabolous, Lil Wayne, Wiz Khalifa, Lloyd Banks, Future, Jeremih, Jim Jones, Wale and Bounce. With production coming from Sha Money XL and Jahlil Beats, among others.

== Background ==
On November 10, 2012, Juelz Santana announced he would be changing the title of his mixtape from The Reagan Era to God Will'n. On December 7, 2012, he revealed during an interview with MTV that he changed the title to God Will'n, because he felt The Reagan Era was dated especially after Kendrick Lamar used a similar title for a song. On December 21, 2012, he released the cover and announced after numerous delays that the mixtape would be released on January 14, 2013.

On January 7, 2013, during an interview with The Village Voice, Juelz Santana said that he had already finished another mixtape to be released following God Will'n that sees him rapping over other artists' beats, saying:

"I'm gonna treat the situations like I'm a new artist. I'm just hungry again, God Will'n is just gonna be the start of a new chapter. I got a new label situation called Anything's Possible. But it's still Dipset, Skull Gang. I'm still on Def Jam. I already got the second mixtape done after God Will'n where I'll be rapping over other people's beats but we're just going to talk about God Will'n for now. I'm just happy to be back in business. I want to enjoy working and go hard and be where I need to be. Right where some of these niggas ain't supposed to be. I'm still lookin better than a lot of niggas who just dropped albums though. They looking lost out here. It's time to follow the leader again."

== Singles ==
On January 18, 2010, the first song was released in promotion of the mixtape titled "Home Run" featuring Lil Wayne. The music video for "Home Run" featuring Lil Wayne was released on February 4, 2011. On November 27, 2012, the second song was released in promotion of the mixtape titled "Bodies" featuring Lil Reese. The music video for "Bodies" was released on January 14, 2013. On January 8, 2013, the third song was released in promotion of the mixtape titled "Soft" featuring Rick Ross, Meek Mill and Fabolous. On January 9, 2013, the fourth song was released in promotion of the mixtape titled "Sho Nuff". On January 28, 2013, the music video for "Nobody Knows" featuring Future was released. On February 13, 2013, the music video for "Awesome" featuring Wale was released. On February 18, 2013, the music video was released for "Everything Is Good" featuring Wiz Khalifa and Bucksy Luciano.

== Critical response ==
Professional ratings
Review scores
Source	Rating
BET	3/5 stars
XXL	(L)

God Will'n was met with generally mixed reviews from music critics. Dan Reagans of BET gave the mixtape three out of five stars, saying "Ultimately it will be up to fans to determine if God Will'n is enough of a peace offering to make up for the frustrating inconsistency they've been through with the Harlem MC. No matter how one might be leaning at the moment this project does have enough solid moments to make it a worthy appetizer for his oft delayed LP". Ralph Bristout of XXL gave the mixtape an L, saying "All in all, God Will'n exhibits everything that a Dipset diehard expects from the Uptown rhymester, but that can also be bittersweet. Although it's clear that he hasn't lost a step, Juelz doesn't offer anything new or refreshing to the table."

Edwin Ortiz of HipHopDX gave the mixtape a positive review, saying "The best way to describe Juelz Santana on God Will'n is that he exerts less energy and still scores the same favorable results throughout the mixtape. It's tough to gauge if he has grown wiser or it's just his frame of mind at the moment, but regardless, Juelz succeeds with his latest project".

On December 24, 2013, XXL named it the ninth best mixtape of the year, saying "Santana pulls no punches, gives no fucks, cares not at all about his standing in the rap game compared to a decade ago. [...] It was an addictive project, and one that didn't get old fast."

== Track listing ==
No.	Title	Producer(s)	Length
1.	"Sho Nuff"	Buda & Grandz; Beat Butcha	4:31
2.	"Nobody's Safe"	Jahlil Beats	3:30
3.	"Bad Guy" (featuring Jadakiss)	Dr. Freak	4:11
4.	"Soft" (featuring Rick Ross, Meek Mill and Fabolous)	Young Shun	4:08
5.	"Black Out" (featuring Lil Wayne)	Sha Money XL; Ty Real	3:57
6.	"My Will"	Gnyus	3:27
7.	"Clickin'" (featuring Yo Gotti)	Nonstop Da Hitman	3:34
8.	"Everything Is Good" (featuring Wiz Khalifa)	Kino Beats	3:18
9.	"Wanna Be Me"	Prime	2:48
10.	"Turn It Up" (featuring Lloyd Banks)	Automatik	2:41
11.	"Nobody Knows" (featuring Future)	Dr. Freak	4:03
12.	"Blog That"	Sha Money XL; Ty Real	3:22
13.	"Nothing To Me" (featuring Jeremih)	The Futuristiks	4:27
14.	"Both Sides" (featuring Lil Durk and Jim Jones)	Ronnie	3:15
15.	"What I Want"	Sha Money XL	3:50
16.	"Awesome" (featuring Wale)	Jokey	3:46
17.	"Bodies" (featuring Lil Reese)	Nonstop Da Hitman	3:48
18.	"Shoot 'Em Up" (featuring Bounce)	DB Beats	2:54
