= No Matta What (Party All Night) =

2002 song performed by Toya

Single by Toya

from the album Toya
- Released: January 18, 2002
- Length: 3:26
- Label: Arista
- Songwriters: David Frank; Nate Butler
- Producer: David Frank

Toya singles chronology
"I Do!!" (2001)	"No Matta What (Party All Night)" (2002)	"Hey Ma" (2002)

"No Matta What (Party All Night)" is the second single by American R&B singer Toya, from her self-titled debut album, Toya (2001). It was written by David Frank and Nathan Butler. After the success of her previous hit "I Do!!", which peaked at number 16 on the US Billboard Hot 100, Toya released only one more single, "No Matta What", before being contractually released from Arista Records. The song peaked at No. 86 on the Billboard Hot 100 and number 25 in Australia.

== Music video ==
In the music video, Toya appears in her house with her friends who tell her what she must wear. Then, they go to a party, leaving the galaxy for Earth.

== Track listings ==
- US 12-inch single

A1. "No Matta What (Party All Night)" (Kevin Davis mix) – 3:45
A2. "No Matta What (Party All Night)" (radio mix) – 3:26
A3. "No Matta What (Party All Night)" (Track Masters remix) – 4:08
B1. "No Matta What (Party All Night)" (Kevin Davis mix instrumental) – 3:45
B2. "No Matta What (Party All Night)" (Track Masters remix instrumental) – 4:10
B3. "No Matta What (Party All Night)" (radio mix acapella) – 4:10

- Australian CD single
1. "No Matta What (Party All Night)" (radio mix) – 3:27
2. "No Matta What (Party All Night)" (Kevin Davis mix) – 3:46
3. "No Matta What (Party All Night)" (Track Masters remix) – 4:10
4. "No Matta What (Party All Night)" (Mike Rizzo remix) – 3:46
5. "No Matta What (Party All Night)" (radio mix instrumental) – 3:27

== Charts ==
Chart (2002)	Peak position
Australia (ARIA)	25
Australian Urban (ARIA)	10
US Billboard Hot 100	86
US Mainstream Top 40 (Billboard)	33
US Rhythmic Top 40 (Billboard)	34

== Release history ==
Region	Date	Format(s)	Label(s)	Ref.
United States	January 18, 2002	Rhythmic contemporary radio	Arista	
United States	February 11, 2002	Contemporary hit radio	Arista	
Australia	June 3, 2002	CD	Arista	
