= From Me to U =

Studio album by Juelz Santana
- Released: August 19, 2003
- Recorded: 2002–2003
- Genres: East Coast hip-hop; gangsta rap; chipmunk soul
- Length: 70:34
- Labels: Diplomats; Roc-A-Fella; Def Jam
- Producers: Cam'ron, Jim Jones, The Heatmakerz, Jazze Pha, Chad Hamilton, Edward Hinson, Charlemagne

Juelz Santana chronology
From Me to U (2003)	What the Game's Been Missing! (2005)

Singles from From Me to U
- 1. "Dipset (Santana's Town)" Released: July 20, 2003

Professional ratings
Review scores
Source	Rating
AllMusic	2.5/5 stars
Blender	3/5 stars
Pitchfork	(3.2/10)
RapReviews	(6/10)
USA Today	2/4 stars
Vibe	2.5/5 stars

From Me to U is the debut studio album by American rapper Juelz Santana. The album was released on August 19, 2003 as planned, under Diplomat, Roc-A-Fella and Def Jam. The album was seen as the introspective introduction of the rapper to mainstream entertainment. Following appearances on various street mixtapes and the success of The Diplomats, Santana was the second member of the group to release a solo album, after de facto leader Cam'ron.

From Me to U was the second official album to be released while the super group was signed to Diplomat Records, a sublabel of Roc-A-Fella Records at the time, following Cam'ron's Roc-A-Fella debut Come Home with Me. Upon its release in 2003, after one year of recording and mastering, the 20-tracked album found commercial success, reaching #8 on the Billboard 200 and #3 on the Top R&B/Hip-Hop Albums, even though the album received generally negative reviews by critics. Though some tracks originally were featured on Juelz's street mixtape Final Destination, they were still applied to the track listing of the official album as well.

== Commercial performance ==
The album debuted at number 8 on the Billboard 200 selling 74,000 copies in its first week. The album has sold 330,000 copies as of 2005.

== Track listing ==
Credits adapted from the album's liner notes.

No.	Title	Writer(s)	Producer(s)	Length
1.	"The Champ Is Here" (featuring Freekey Zekey)	LaRon James; Gregory Green; Sean Thomas	The Heatmakerz	2:25
2.	"One Day I Smile"	James; Green; Thomas; Grenville Harding	The Heatmakerz	2:45
3.	"Okay Okay"	James; Green; Thomas; Thomas Bell; William Hart	The Heatmakerz	3:21
4.	"Down (Skit)" (featuring Freekey Zekey & Monique Garnett)			1:25
5.	"Down"	James; Green; Thomas; Norman Whitfield	The Heatmakerz	3:45
6.	"Monster Music" (featuring Opera Steve)	James; Green; Thomas; Jim Steinman	The Heatmakerz	4:17
7.	"Back Again"	James; Green; Thomas; Harold Hudson; William King	The Heatmakerz	4:44
8.	"My Problem (Jealousy)"	James; Henri Charlemagne; Harold Payne; Mike Scarpiello; Ed Pease	Charlemagne	3:44
9.	"How I Feel"	James; Green; Thomas	The Heatmakerz	1:40
10.	"Why"	James; Green; Thomas; James Harris III; Terry Lewis; Usher Raymond	The Heatmakerz	3:57
11.	"Wherever I Go" (featuring Jimmy Jones)	James; Chad Hamilton; Joseph Jones; Ryan Presson	Chad Hamilton; Ryan Press (co.)	4:18
12.	"Dipset (Santana's Town) (Skit)" (featuring Freekey Zekey & Monique Garnett)			1:16
13.	"Dipset (Santana's Town)" (featuring Cam'ron)	James; Cameron Giles; Edward Hinson	Self	3:38
14.	"Squalie (Skit)" (featuring Freekey Zekey, Mike Peters, Monique Garnett)			0:55
15.	"Squalie" (featuring J. R. Writer)	James; Green; Thomas; Barry White; Rusty Brito	The Heatmakerz	4:16
16.	"Rain Drops"	James; Charlemagne; Jesse W. Johnson; Keith D. Lewis	Charlemagne	4:34
17.	"My Love (Remix)" (featuring Jimmy Jones)	James; Jones; Green; Thomas; James Ingram	The Heatmakerz	3:09
18.	"Let's Go" (featuring Cam'ron)	Giles; Green; Thomas; Marvin Gaye; Ed Townsend	The Heatmakerz	4:42
19.	"Now What" (featuring T.I.)	James; Phalon Alexander; Clifford Harris	Jazze Pha	5:21
20.	"This Is for My Homies" (featuring Jimmy Jones)	James; Jones; Thomas; Tracy Carter; Chris Jackson; Taura Stinson; Milton Turner Jr.	The Heatmakerz	6:23
Total length:				70:34

Sample credits

- "One Day I Smile" contains a sample of "Mr. Heartbreak", written by Grenville Harding, as performed by The Delegation.
- "Okay Okay" contains a sample of "Trying to Make a Fool of Me", written by Thomas Bell and William Hart, as performed by The Delfonics.
- "Down" contains a sample of "I'm Going Down", written by Norman Whitfield, as performed by Mary J. Blige.
- "Monster Music" contains an interpolation of "Making Love Out of Nothing at All", written by Jim Steinman.
- "Back Again" contains a sample of "You're Special", written by Harold Hudson and William King, as performed by The Commodores.
- "My Problem (Jealousy)" contains a sample of "Jealousy", written by Harold Payne, Mike Scarpiello, and Ed Pease, as performed by Vickie Sue Robinson.
- "How I Feel" contains a sample of "Woman to Woman", written by James Banks, Eddie Marion, and Henderson Thigpen Jr., as performed by Shirley Brown.
- "Why" contains a sample of "Can U Help Me", written by James Harris III, Terry Lewis, and Usher Raymond, as performed by Usher.
- "Dipset (Santana's Town)" contains a sample from "Anvil Chorus", performed by The Chicago Symphony and Chorus.
- "Squalie" contains a sample of "I Love You So, Never Gonna Let You Go", written by Barry White, as performed by The Love Unlimited Orchestra.
- "Rain Drops" contains a sample of "Nights Like This", written by Jesse W. Johnson and Keith D. Lewis, as performed by After 7.
- "My Love (Remix)" contains a sample of "Look What You've Done", written by James Ingram, as performed by The Moments.
- "Let's Go" contains a sample from "Let's Get It On", written by Marvin Gaye and Ed Townsend, as performed by Marvin Gaye.
- "This Is for My Homies" contains a sample from "Gangsta Lean", written by Tracy Carter, Chris Jackson, Taura Stinson, Milton Turner Jr., as performed by DRS.

== Charts ==
=== Weekly charts ===
Chart (2003)	Peak position
US Billboard 200	8
US Top R&B/Hip-Hop Albums (Billboard)	3

=== Year-end charts ===
Chart (2003)	Position
US Top R&B/Hip-Hop Albums (Billboard)	73
