= Toya (album) =

Studio album by Toya
- Released: August 7, 2001
- Length: 58:55
- Label: Arista
- Producer: Allstar; Bam; Bless; Ryan Bowser; Copenhaniacs; Dallas Austin; David Frank; Ramahn "Jer-Z" Herbert; K-Mack; Clemont Mack; Multiman; Soulshock & Karlin

Singles from Toya
- 1. "I Do!!" Released: March 20, 2001; 2. "No Matta What (Party All Night)" Released: January 18, 2002

Toya is the self-titled only studio album by American R&B singer Toya. It was released by Arista Records on August 7, 2001. Musically, the album is a R&B album that incorporates hip hop soul elements. Toya peaked at number 109 on the US Billboard 200.

== Critical reception ==
Professional ratings
Review scores
| Source | Rating |
|---|---|
| Allmusic | 4.5/5 stars |

Toya received positive reviews. Stephen Thomas Erlewine of Allmusic noted the album's "savvy combination of classic soul conventions, innovative production, strong songwriting, and fine, understated singing," and called the album "not just a fine debut, but one of the best urban records of 2001."

== Commercial performance ==
Toya peaked at 109 on the US Billboard 200, reaching sixty on the Top R&B/Hip-Hop Albums.

== Track listing ==
| No. | Title | Music | Length |
|---|---|---|---|
| 1. | "No Matta What (Party All Night)" | David Frank, Nathan Butler | 3:28 |
| 2. | "How Can I Be Down" | Bam, Ryan Bowser | 3:22 |
| 3. | "I Do!!" | Bam, Ryan Bowser | 3:33 |
| 4. | "The Truth" | Bless, K-Mack | 3:53 |
| 5. | "Think" | Allstar | 3:55 |
| 6. | "Don't Make Me" | Bam, Ryan Bowser | 4:10 |
| 7. | "Moving On" | Soulshock & Karlin | 4:24 |
| 8. | "What Else Can I Do" | Bless, K-Mack | 3:26 |
| 9. | "Untouchables" (feat. Penelope) | Copenhaniacs, Multiman | 4:29 |
| 10. | "Book of Love" (featuring Loon) | Bam, Ryan Bowser | 4:02 |
| 11. | "What's a Girl to Do" | Soulshock & Karlin | 3:43 |
| 12. | "I Messed Up" | Bam, Ryan Bowser | 4:08 |
| 13. | "Bounce" | Bam, Ryan Bowser | 3:21 |
| 14. | "Fiasco" (featuring T.I.) | Dallas Austin | 4:13 |
| 15. | "I Do, Pt. 2" (featuring Murphy Lee) | Clemont Mack, Ramahn "Jer-Z" Herbert | 4:48 |
| Total length: | | | 58:55 |

== Personnel ==
Information taken from Allmusic

- Co-production – Harold Guy, Kelli Justice, Toya
- Mixing – Charles "Prince Charles" Alexander, Tim Olmstead
- Performer(s) – Loon, Murphy Lee, The Penelopes, T.I.
- Production – Allstar, Bam, Bless, Ryan Bowser, Copenhaniacs, Dallas Awesome, David Frank, Ramahn "Jer-Z" Herbert, K-Mack, Clemont Mack, Multiman, Soulshock & Karlin

== Charts ==
| Chart (2001) | Peak position |
|---|---|
| US Billboard 200 | 109 |
| US Heatseekers Albums (Billboard) | 1 |
| US Top R&B/Hip-Hop Albums (Billboard) | 60 |
