= I Do!! =

2001 single by Toya

Single by Toya

from the album Toya
- B-side: "I Do!! Pt. 2"
- Released: March 20, 2001
- Studio: Unique (New York City)
- Length: 3:33
- Label: Arista
- Songwriters: Harold Guy; Latoya Rodriguez
- Producer: Antoine "Bam" Macon

Toya singles chronology
"I Do!!" (2001)	"No Matta What (Party All Night)" (2002)

"I Do!!" is the debut single of American R&B singer Toya, serving as the lead single from her debut album, Toya (2001). Produced by Antoine "Bam" Macon, "I Do!!" became a hit for Toya, reaching No. 16 on the US Billboard Hot 100, No. 12 in Australia, and No. 9 in New Zealand. Toya released only one more single, 2002's "No Matta What (Party All Night)", before being contractually released from Arista Records.

== Track listings ==
US CD and 12-inch single
No.	Title	Length
1.	"I Do!!" (radio mix)	3:35
2.	"I Do!!" (instrumental)	3:34

US maxi-CD and Australian CD single
No.	Title	Length
1.	"I Do!!" (radio mix)	3:36
2.	"I Do!!" (video edit)	3:46
3.	"I Do!! Pt. 2" (featuring Murphy Lee of St. Lunatics)	4:49
4.	"I Do!!" (Pete Avila's Ghetto Fab club mix)	5:47

== Credits and personnel ==
Credits are taken from the US CD single liner notes.

Studios

- Recorded at Unique Recording Studios (New York City)
- Mixed at Chung King Studios (New York City)

Personnel

- Harold Guy – writing, arrangement
- Toya – writing (as Latoya Rodriguez)
- Antoine "Bam" Macon – production
- Steve Eigner – recording
- Kevin Davis – mixing
- Christopher Stern – art direction
- Keith Major – photography

== Charts ==
=== Weekly charts ===
Chart (2001–2002)	Peak position
Australia (ARIA)	12
Australian Urban (ARIA)	5
New Zealand (Recorded Music NZ)	9
US Billboard Hot 100	16
US Hot R&B/Hip-Hop Singles & Tracks (Billboard)	25
US Mainstream Top 40 (Billboard)	6
US Maxi-Singles Sales (Billboard)	3
US Rhythmic (Billboard)	8
US Top 40 Tracks (Billboard)	10

=== Year-end charts ===
Chart (2001)	Position
US Billboard Hot 100	60
US Mainstream Top 40 (Billboard)	70
US Maxi-Singles Sales (Billboard)	25
US Rhythmic Top 40 (Billboard)	27

Chart (2002)	Position
Australian Urban (ARIA)	35
US Billboard Hot 100	100
US Mainstream Top 40 (Billboard)	45

== Release history ==
Region	Date	Format(s)	Label(s)	Ref.
United States	March 20, 2001	Urban radio	Arista	
United States	May 22, 2001	Maxi-CD	Arista	
Australia	February 25, 2002	CD	Arista	
