= LaVar Walker =

American comedian and writer

LaVar Walker is an American stand-up comedian, writer, and pharmacist. He has appeared on television and toured nationally.

== Biography ==
Walker was born on the south side of Chicago and earned a doctoral degree in pharmacy from Xavier University in New Orleans. He has appeared on Uptown Comic, The Mo'Nique Show, and BET's ComicView. He also has a writing credit for his appearance on BET's ComicView.

In 2012, Walker won the "Stand up its Miller Time" national comedy championship in Las Vegas, which came with a $10,000 prize. That same year, he toured nationally with the Shaquille O'Neal All Star Comedy Jam. Reflecting on his career in 2013, Walker told the Chicago Sun-Times, "looking back on everything I've done to this point, I think I made it. I'm the biggest star in the world to me."

In 2014, Walker was allegedly assaulted and battered by comedian Mike Epps and two unidentified men believed to be Epps' bodyguards. After recording a video spoofing a purported feud with Kevin Hart, Walker was confronted, punched, and kicked in the face by Epps and the two men. Walker was then hospitalized at Grady Memorial Hospital for contusions and bruises on his head, face, and body.

== Reception ==
Walker has received positive comments from celebrities. In a 2012 YouTube video Shaquille O'Neal said, "LaVar is funnier than a mother. You know what I'm talking about." In a 2013 Chicago Sun-Times article, comedian Kevin Hart said: "Remember the name Lavar Walker because I want to be able to say, 'I told you so!' The guy is a legitimate comedic star."
