= Mike Epps: Don't Take It Personal =

- Directed by: L. Frazier
- Starring: Mike Epps
- Country of origin: United States
- Original language: English

Production
- Running time: 59 minutes

Original release
- Network: Netflix
- Release: December 18, 2015

Mike Epps: Don't Take It Personal is a 2015 Netflix stand-up comedy special by American comic Mike Epps, his first Netflix stand-up special for Netflix. In Don't Take it Personal, directed by L. Frazier, Mike Epps talks about men's habits in their arguments with women, unsuccessful attempts to sell cocaine and more.

== Cast ==
- Mike Epps

== Release ==
It was released on December 18, 2015 on Netflix streaming.
