= What the Game's Been Missing! =

Studio album by Juelz Santana
- Released: November 22, 2005
- Recorded: 2004–2005
- Studio: Santana's World Studio (Juelz Santana's house)
- Genre: Hip hop
- Length: 75:57
- Labels: Island Def Jam; Def Jam; Diplomat
- Producers: Shoddy AKA Shottie, Terrence Anderson, Cliff Carlisle, Chaos & Order, Filthy, Ebonikz, Heatmakerz, DJ Infamous, Darren Joseph, J.U.S.T.I.C.E. League, DJ Nasty & LVM, Mayhem, Soul Sizzle, Streetrunner, Develop, Neo Da Matrix

Juelz Santana chronology
From Me to U (2003)	What the Game's Been Missing! (2005)

Singles from What the Game's Been Missing!
- 1. "Mic Check" Released: December 23, 2004; 2. "There It Go (The Whistle Song)" Released: October 2005; 3. "Oh Yes" Released: January 5, 2006; 4. "Clockwork" Released: February 2006

Professional ratings
Review scores
Source	Rating
AllMusic	3.5/5 stars
HipHopDX	3/5
Pitchfork	6.9/10
PopMatters	7/10
RapReviews	6.5/10
Rolling Stone	3.5/5 stars
Vibe	3.5/5 stars

What the Game's Been Missing! is the second studio album by American rapper Juelz Santana, released on November 22, 2005, by The Island Def Jam Music Group, Def Jam Recordings, and Cam'Ron's Diplomat Records. The album yielded the singles "Mic Check", "There It Go (The Whistle Song)", "Oh Yes", "Make It Work For Ya" (feat. Lil Wayne and Young Jeezy) and "Clockwork".

== Background ==
In an interview with Hip Hop Canada, Juelz Santana remarked that his approach to the making of What the Game's Been Missing was different from his other albums, noting the amount of effort and work he was able to contribute to it, saying: "I'm definitely going to say that I like this album the best mainly because I got to work on it and I got to grow with it. I took care of a lot of things on it and not to say that my other albums were not good, but I just got to put more work into the making of this one."

Originally 160 songs were recorded for the album, taking over a year to make. He described the process as "learning how to ride a bike." asserting to the fact that the basis of the album developed deeper into production. The album was also influenced by the 1994 film Fresh, In the song "Lil' Boy Fresh" he loosely summarizes the story from beginning to end.

== Commercial performance ==
In the United States, What the Game's Been Missing! debuted at number nine on the Billboard 200, selling 141,000 copies in its first week. As of January 3, 2006, the album has been certified Gold by the Recording Industry Association of America (RIAA), for selling 500,000 copies.

== Track listing ==
Credits adapted from the album's liner notes.

No.	Title	Writer(s)	Producer(s)	Length
1.	"What the Game's Been Missing (Intro / Skit)"	LaRon James; Bigram Zayas	Develop	2:18
2.	"Rumble Young Man Rumble"	James; Kevin Crowe; Erik Ortiz; Clifford Brown II; Mike Rapp	J.U.S.T.I.C.E. League	2:34
3.	"Oh Yes"	James; Gregory Green; Sean Thomas; William Garrett; Georgia Dobbins; Robert Bateman; Brian Holland; Freddie Gorman	The Heatmakerz	3:01
4.	"Shottas" (featuring Cam'ron & Sizzla)	James; Cameron Giles; Green; Thomas; Miguel Collins; LeRoy Moore	The Heatmakerz	4:35
5.	"Clockwork"	James; James McEwan; Todd Spadafore	Chaos & Order	3:05
6.	"Kill 'Em" (featuring Cam'ron)	James; Giles; Rashad Robinson	Shoddy AKA Shottie	3:26
7.	"This Is Me"	James; Scott Gaddy	The Ratt Pakk	2:54
8.	"Make It Work for You" (featuring Lil Wayne & Young Jeezy)	James; Zayas; Matthew Del Giorno; Marco Rodriguez-Diaz; Dwayne Carter; Jay Jenkins	Doe Boys (Develop & Filthy); Infamous (co.)	3:51
9.	"Whatever U Wanna Call It" (featuring Hell Rell)	James; Robinson; Durrell Muhammad	Shoddy AKA Shottie	4:10
10.	"Gangsta Shit"	James; Zayas; Del Giorno; Rodriguez-Diaz	Doe Boys; Infamous (co.)	3:09
11.	"Lil' Boy Fresh"	James; Derrick Ridley; Kathy Wakefield; Leonard Caston Jr.	Manti	3:53
12.	"Good Times"	James; Quaadir Atkinson	Neo Da Matrix	3:29
13.	"Freaky"	James; Zayas; Rodriguez-Diaz	Develop; Infamous (co.)	2:58
14.	"Murda Murda" (featuring Cam'ron)	James; Jermaine Jackson; Andrew Harr; Johnny Mollings; Leonardo Mollings; Ini Kamoze	The Runners; DJ Nasty & LVM	4:04
15.	"Gone"	James; Nicholas Warwar; Elijah Scott; Stephen Hacker; Delvin Alexander	Streetrunner; Ebonikz (co.)	3:58
16.	"Kid Is Back"	James; Corey Redd; Bob Feldman; Gerald Goldstein; Richard Gottehrer	Soul Sizzle	2:46
17.	"Changes" (featuring Razah)	James; Robinson; Martell Nelson	Shoddy AKA Shottie	3:51
18.	"I Am Crack"	James; Sharif Slater	Reefa	3:37
19.	"There It Go (The Whistle Song)"	James; Daren Joseph; Terence Anderson; Greg Taylor; Carlisle Young	Daren Joseph; Terence Anderson; Mayhem (co).; Carlisle (co.)	3:00
20.	"Violence" (featuring Bezel)	James; Green; Thomas; Preston Corley III	The Heatmakerz	4:14
21.	"Daddy"	James; Green; Thomas; Diane Warren	The Heatmakerz	4:08
22.	"Mic Check"	James; Atkinson	Neo Da Matrix	2:56

iTunes bonus track
No.	Title	Writer(s)	Producer(s)	Length
23.	"Do Dat"	James; Zayas	Develop	4:16

Sample credits

- "Rumble Young Man Rumble" contains a sample of "Never Had a Woman on My Mind (More Than a Day)", written by Mike Rapp, as performed by A-440 featuring Ted Neeley.
- "Oh Yes" contains a sample of "Please Mr. Postman", written by William Garrett, Georgia Dobbins, Robert Bateman, Brian Holland, and Freddie Gorman, as performed by The Marvelettes.
- "Shottas" contains a sample from "Your Love", written by Miguel Collins and LeRoy Moore, as performed by Sizzla.
- "Lil' Boy Fresh" contains a sample of "I've Got To Be", written by Kathy Wakefield and Leonard Caston Jr., as performed by Eddie Kendricks.
- "Murda Murda" contains a sample of "World-A-Music", written and performed by Ini Kamoze.
- "Kid is Back" contains interpolations of "My Boyfriend's Back", written by Bob Feldman, Gerald Goldstein, and Richard Gottehrer.
- "Daddy" contains a sample of "I Don't Want to Miss a Thing", written by Diane Warren, as performed by Aerosmith.

== Charts ==
=== Weekly charts ===
Chart (2005–2006)	Peak position
UK R&B Albums (Official Charts)	33
US Billboard 200	9
US Top R&B/Hip-Hop Albums (Billboard)	1

=== Year-end charts ===
Chart (2006)	Position
US Billboard 200	94
US Top R&B/Hip-Hop Albums (Billboard)	19

== Certifications ==
Region	Certification	Certified units/sales
United States (RIAA)	Gold	500,000^{^}
^{^} Shipments figures based on certification alone.
