= Dipset (Santana's Town) =

Single by Juelz Santana featuring Cam'ron

from the album From Me to U
- Released: July 20, 2003
- Recorded: 2003
- Genre: East Coast hip hop
- Length: 3:38
- Label: Roc-A-Fella Records, Diplomat Records, Def Jam Records
- Songwriters: E. Hanson, Cameron Giles, LaRon James
- Producer: Edward Hinson

Juelz Santana singles chronology
"Welcome to New York City" (2002)	"Dipset (Santana's Town)" (2003)	"Crunk Muzik" (2004)

"Dipset (Santana's Town)" is a song by American rapper Juelz Santana, released on July 20, 2003, as the lead single from his debut studio album From Me to U. The song features vocals from Santana's Dipset cohort Cam'ron. The video features a cameo appearance by fellow American rapper Killer Mike. The only single from From Me to U, the song reached No. 70 on the U.S. Billboard Hot R&B/Hip-Hop Songs chart. It was nominated at the annual 2004 Grammy Awards ceremony for the Best Rap Performance by a Duo or Group.

== Charts ==
Chart (2003)	Peak Position
U.S. Billboard Hot R&B/Hip-Hop Songs	70
