= Taz Wube =

Ethiopian-American marketing executive, entertainment promoter, and venue owner

Tesfa "Taz" Wube is an Ethiopian-American marketing executive, entertainment promoter, and venue owner.

== Early life ==
Wube attended Ohio State University and is a member of Kappa Alpha Psi fraternity.

== Career ==
=== From Dream to Love, the Marc and Taz Brand ===
Wube arrived in Washington, D.C., in 1998. He began promotions at Republic Gardens. Wube started working with entertainment lifestyle mogul Marc Barnes.

Wube became the marketing director of Dream Nightclub in 2001. He played a crucial part of the relaunch and re-branding of Dream Nightclub as Love Nightclub.

Shortly following the opening of their second venue The Park at 14th, in 2008, Marc and Taz parted ways amicably.

=== Suite 202 and Taz Events ===
Wube manages event management and marketing company, Suite 202. Outside of mainstay events, Suite 202 hosts special events such as: Steve Francis Roast & After Party Concert, "More Than A Game" Movie World Premiere Party for LeBron James, Caron Butler’s Worldwide Tour in Los Angeles and Miami, recording artist Wale & Kevin Durant’s Birthday Party, Howard University's Homecoming with Kid Cudi and The Clipse, Willis McGahee & Antwan Barnes Birthday Party.

=== Party Boyz ===
Wube's television debut, alongside then-partner Marc Barnes, was in the series entitled Party Boyz. The show chronicled the fast-paced daily lives of Marc and Taz as leaders in nightlife entertainment.
