= Clockwork (Juelz Santana song) =

Single by Juelz Santana

from the album What the Game's Been Missing!
- Released: February 2006
- Recorded: 2005
- Genre: Hip hop
- Length: 3:05
- Label: Diplomat; Def Jam
- Songwriters: Juelz Santana, James McEwan and Todd Spadafore
- Producers: Chaos & Order

Juelz Santana singles chronology
"Run It!" (2005)	"Clockwork" (2006)	"It's LL and Santana" (2006)

"Clockwork" is the fourth single by American rapper Juelz Santana from his second studio album What the Game's Been Missing! (2005).

== Music video ==
The music video for the song was directed by Dale "Rage" Resteghini.

== Charts ==
Chart (2006)	Peak position
US Billboard Hot R&B/Hip-Hop Songs	68
