= Oh Boy (Cam'ron song) =

2002 single by Cam'ron featuring Juelz Santana

Single by Cam'ron featuring Juelz Santana

from the album Come Home with Me
- B-side: "The ROC (Just Fire)"
- Released: April 2, 2002
- Recorded: 2001
- Genre: Hip hop; Chipmunk soul
- Length: 3:24
- Label: Roc-A-Fella; Diplomat; Def Jam
- Songwriters: Justin Smith, Cameron Giles, LaRon James, Norman Whitfield
- Producer: Just Blaze

Cam'ron singles chronology
"Welcome to New York City" (2002)	"Oh Boy" (2002)	"Hey Ma" (2002)

Juelz Santana singles chronology
"Oh Boy" (2002)	"Hey Ma" (2002)

"Oh Boy" is a 2002 Grammy-nominated hip hop single by Cam'ron from his album Come Home with Me, and features Juelz Santana. The single was released through Jay-Z's Roc-A-Fella Records, Cam'ron's Diplomat Records and Def Jam Recordings.

The song samples "I'm Going Down" by Rose Royce. It held the number one chart on the Hot R&B/Hip-Hop Singles for five weeks straight. It also held the number one chart on the Hot Rap Tracks. It peaked at number four on the Billboard Hot 100. The song is produced by Just Blaze who originally made it for Memphis Bleek. The song ranked 89th on VH1's 100 Greatest Songs of Hip Hop.

== Music video ==
The video was filmed in Harlem, Manhattan, New York City, New York and was directed by Bryan Barber and Jim Jones. The video features cameo appearances from Damon Dash, La La Vazquez, Angie Martinez, Free Marie, Freekey Zekey, DJ Stretch Armstrong, Jim Jones, the late Miya Granatella, and the late Huddy 6.

== Remixes ==
The official remix of this song entitled "Oh Girl (Oh Boy Remix)", features Birdman, TQ, and Jim Jones. Jay-Z was also to be on the remix, but his verse was removed by Cam'ron due to the verse containing a diss track to Jay-Z's then-rival rapper Nas.

Mariah Carey recorded and released an answer song to "Oh Boy" in 2002 for her ninth album Charmbracelet called, "Boy (I Need You)". The song features samples from "I'm Going Down" by Rose Royce. Cam'ron also appeared on the song. The remix version also features Cam'ron, Juelz Santana, Jim Jones, and Freeway. It was referred as "Oh Boy Part 3". It is the 2nd official remix of "Oh Boy". The song & the remix version was also produced by Just Blaze.

Lil Wayne freestyled over the instrumental on his 2002 mixtape, SQ1.

In 2019 British singer Mahalia sampled the song for her single "What You Did" featuring English singer Ella Mai

== Charts ==
=== Weekly charts ===
Chart (2002)	Peak position
Europe (European Hot 100 Singles)	54
Germany (GfK)	70
New Zealand (Recorded Music NZ)	50
Scotland Singles (OCC)	35
UK Singles (OCC)	13
UK Hip Hop/R&B (OCC)	1
US Billboard Hot 100	4
US Hot Rap Songs (Billboard)	1
US Hot R&B/Hip-Hop Songs (Billboard)	1
US Pop Airplay (Billboard)	24
US Rhythmic Airplay (Billboard)	2
US Top 40 Tracks (Billboard)	19

=== Year-end charts ===
Chart (2002)	Position
UK Singles (OCC)	197
UK Urban (Music Week)	18
US Billboard Hot 100	30
US Hot R&B/Hip-Hop Songs (Billboard)	8

== Certifications ==
Region	Certification	Certified units/sales
United Kingdom (BPI)	Silver	200,000^{‡}
^{‡} Sales+streaming figures based on certification alone.
