= Skull Gang (album) =

Studio album by Skull Gang
- Released: May 5, 2009
- Studio: Santana's World
- Genre: Hip hop
- Length: 41:41
- Label: Skull Gang; E1
- Producer: Juelz Santana (exec.)

Professional ratings
Review scores
Source	Rating
AllMusic	3/5 stars
Now	3/5 Ns

Skull Gang is the self-titled only studio album by American hip hop collective Skull Gang. It was released on May 5, 2009, through Skull Gang/E1 Entertainment. Recording sessions took place at Santana's World. Executively produced by Juelz Santana, it features guest appearances from Lil Wayne and Jim Jones.

In the United States, the album debuted at number 142 on the Billboard 200, number 25 on the Top R&B/Hip-Hop Albums, number 9 on the Top Rap Albums, number 19 on the Independent Albums and number 2 on the Heatseekers Albums charts.

An accompanying music video was directed for REO-produced promotional single "I Am the Club".

== Track listing ==
No.	Title	Length
1.	"Take Over" (Juelz Santana and Starr)	2:31
2.	"Aggy" (Juelz Santana, UnKasa and Richmond Rabb)	3:54
3.	"Drama Fold" (Juelz Santana, John Depp and Richmond Rabb)	4:12
4.	"Fire" (Juelz Santana, UnKasa and Richmond Rabb)	2:38
5.	"I Am the Club" (John Depp, Juelz Santana, UnKasa, Richmond Rabb and Deniro)	3:47
6.	"Mazi" (UnKasa, Starr, John Depp, Juelz Santana and Richmond Rabb)	3:56
7.	"Who Said That" (Skit)	2:43
8.	"Problems" (Juelz Santana and Richmond Rabb featuring Lil Wayne)	4:18
9.	"Birds Flyin In" (Juelz Santana and Richmond Rabb featuring Jim Jones)	3:55
10.	"Don't Want You Back" (Juelz Santana, John Depp and Richmond Rabb)	3:31
11.	"Rock Star" (Juelz Santana and Starr featuring Lil Wayne)	4:05
12.	"Make It Rain" (Starr and Juelz Santana)	2:19
Total length:		41:41

== Personnel ==
- LaRon "Juelz Santana" James – vocals, executive producer, A&R
- Aqueelah "Starr" Mccummings – vocals (tracks: 1, 6, 7, 11, 12)
- Antonio "Un Kasa" Wilder – vocals (tracks: 2, 4–7)
- Richmond Rabb – vocals (tracks: 2–10)
- John Depp – vocals (tracks: 3, 5–7, 10)
- DeNiro – vocals (track 5)
- Dwayne "Lil Wayne" Carter – vocals (tracks: 8, 11)
- Joseph "Jimmy" Jones – vocals (track 9)
- Ramon "REO" Owen – producer (track 5)
- Dragan Čačinović – mixing
- Steven Vargas – engineering
- Eitan Noy – mixing assistant
- Andrew Kelley – art direction, design
- Chad Griffith – photography
- Paul Grosso – creative direction
- Jermaine James – A&R, management
- Laurel Dann – A&R
- Darrin Chandler – co-A&R, management

== Charts ==
Chart (2009)	Peak position
US Billboard 200	142
US Top R&B/Hip-Hop Albums (Billboard)	25
US Top Rap Albums (Billboard)	9
US Independent Albums (Billboard)	19
US Heatseekers Albums (Billboard)	2
