= Welcome to New York City =

Song by Cam'ron featuring Jay-Z and Juelz Santana

from the album Come Home with Me
- Released: May 14, 2002
- Recorded: 2002
- Genre: Hip hop
- Length: 5:12
- Label: Roc-A-Fella; Diplomat; Def Jam
- Songwriters: Cameron Giles; LaRon James; Shawn Carter
- Producer: Just Blaze

"Welcome to New York City" is the seventh track from Cam'ron's third album Come Home with Me. The song featured fellow Roc-a-Fella labelmates Jay-Z and Juelz Santana. The song was produced by Just Blaze (along with him providing additional vocals), who also produced other songs in this album such as "Losing Weight, Pt. 2" and the hit single Oh Boy. This song was also the theme song for the November 2005 popular crime video game True Crime: New York City. The song peaked at #55 at the Hot R&B/Hip-Hop Singles & Tracks.

== Track listing ==
1. A1 Welcome To New York City (Radio Edit)
2. A2 Welcome To New York City (Album Version)
3. B1 Welcome To New York City (Instrumental)
4. B2 Welcome To New York City (A Cappella)

== Charts ==
| Chart (2002) | Peak position |
|---|---|
| Billboard Hot R&B/Hip-Hop Singles & Tracks | 55 |
