= Oh Yes =

Single by Juelz Santana

from the album What the Game's Been Missing!
- B-side: "Shottas"
- Released: January 5, 2006
- Recorded: 2005
- Genre: East Coast hip hop
- Length: 3:04
- Label: Diplomat; Def Jam
- Songwriters: Juelz Santana, The Heatmakerz, William Garrett, Georgia Dobbins, Robert Bateman, Brian Holland, Freddie Gorman
- Producer: Heatmakerz

Juelz Santana singles chronology
"There It Go (The Whistle Song)" (2005)	"Oh Yes" (2006)	"Run It!" (2005)

Audio
- "Oh Yes" on YouTube

"Oh Yes" is the third single by rapper Juelz Santana from his second studio album What the Game's Been Missing!.

The song samples The Carpenters' cover version of the song "Please Mr. Postman", originally performed by The Marvelettes.

== Charts ==
=== Weekly charts ===
Chart (2006)	Peak position
US Billboard Hot 100	56
US Hot R&B/Hip-Hop Songs (Billboard)	15
US Hot Rap Songs (Billboard)	8
US Rhythmic Airplay (Billboard)	29

=== Year-end charts ===
Chart (2006)	Position
US Hot R&B/Hip-Hop Songs (Billboard)	84
