= There It Go (The Whistle Song) =

Single by Juelz Santana

from the album What the Game's Been Missing!
- Released: October 2005
- Length: 3:04
- Label: Diplomat; Def Jam
- Songwriter: Juelz Santana
- Producers: Daren Joseph, Terence Anderson (Co-Produced by Carlisle & Mayhem)

Juelz Santana singles chronology
"Mic Check" (2005)	"There It Go (The Whistle Song)" (2005)	"Oh Yes" (2005)

"There It Go (The Whistle Song)" is a song by American rapper Juelz Santana, released as the second single from his second studio album What the Game's Been Missing!. It is his highest-charting single to date, peaking at number 6 on the Billboard Hot 100. The song was featured in the film The Fast and the Furious: Tokyo Drift but was not included on the soundtrack. A recognizable aspect of the song is the whistling that occurs during the chorus. The song does not have any melody, only the drums (kicks and claps) and percussions (whistles, shakes and cowbells).

The song first hit Billboard's "Bubbling Under" chart at number 119 on October 7, 2005. The next week, it crossed over to the Hot 100 chart at number 88, rising to number 6 on January 27, 2006. The song showed its staying power by peaking at number 6 on Billboard's Recurrent Hot 100 on March 31, 2006. The New York Times quoted Santana as saying about the song's structure, "I decided to simplify a little bit more. I knew that the whistle would be something that people could come back to – and be distinctive."

== Music video ==
The song also had a music video, in which Santana is about to attend a nightclub, when he gives a little boy, who is his nephew, Ja, a whistle. When asked on what it does, Santana suggests to "blow it and see what happens". Apparently, Santana himself is oblivious to what the whistle does. Throughout the video clip, Santana is seen going to nightclubs and parties, hanging out with attractive women, when all of a sudden they mysteriously leave him and his friends after the sound of a whistle, only to later discover that all the girls he was with ended up being around his nephew, from him blowing the whistle, Santana comes to the realization that the whistle he gave his nephew had the ability to attract any girl who was within the radius of the sound. Keyshia Cole makes a brief cameo during the beginning of the video.

== Charts ==
=== Weekly charts ===
Chart (2005–2006)	Peak position
Australia (ARIA)	33
Canada CHR/Pop Top 30 (Radio & Records)	26
Finland (Suomen virallinen lista)	7
Germany (GfK)	72
Ireland (IRMA)	46
New Zealand (Recorded Music NZ)	29
UK Singles (Official Charts)	47
US Billboard Hot 100	6
US Hot R&B/Hip-Hop Songs (Billboard)	6
US Hot Rap Songs (Billboard)	3
US Pop Airplay (Billboard)	13
US Rhythmic Airplay (Billboard)	5

=== Year-end charts ===
Chart (2006)	Position
US Billboard Hot 100	58
US Hot R&B/Hip-Hop Songs (Billboard)	59
US Rhythmic (Billboard)	37

== Certifications ==
Region	Certification	Certified units/sales
United States (RIAA)	Gold	500,000^{^}
United States (RIAA) Mastertone	Gold	500,000^{*}
^{*} Sales figures based on certification alone.^{^} Shipments figures based on certification alone.

== Release history ==
Release dates and formats for "There It Go (The Whistle Song)"
Region	Date	Format	Label(s)	Ref.
United States	December 6, 2005	Mainstream airplay	Def Jam; Island	

== Other versions ==
American singer Jonn Hart released a single called "Whistle" featuring Too Short in August 2018, which heavily samples both "The Whistle Song" and Too Short's song, "Freaky Tales". A remix of the song featuring Santana was later released in November 2018.
