= Mic Check (Juelz Santana song) =

Single by Juelz Santana

from the album What the Game's Been Missing!
- Released: December 23, 2004
- Recorded: 2004
- Genre: Hip hop
- Length: 3:36
- Label: Diplomat; Def Jam
- Songwriters: Qaadir Atkinson, James Cleveland, Juelz Santana, Quincy Jones
- Producer: Neo da Matrix

Juelz Santana singles chronology
"Crunk Muzik" (2004)	"Mic Check" (2004)	"There It Go (The Whistle Song)" (2005)

"Mic Check" is a song by American rapper Juelz Santana, released as the first single from his second studio album What the Game's Been Missing! (2005). The song's instrumental is based around a sample of "The Roots Mural Theme" by Quincy Jones.

== Critical reception ==
Steve Juon of RapReviews praised Santana's vocal performance on "Mic Check" as an example of "the Santana rap fans are looking for – the one who's a little bit clever with punchlines, who times his flow to go on and off beat purposefully, the one who has a brash personality and sounds like he could dominate the game given half a chance."

== Charts ==
Chart (2005)	Peak position
US Hot R&B/Hip-Hop Songs (Billboard)	76
