= Skull Gang =

American hip hop group, 2007–2010

- Origin: Harlem, New York City, New York
- Genres: Hip hop
- Occupation: Rappers
- Years active: 2007—2010
- Labels: Skull Gang Entertainment, E1 Music
- Past members: Juelz Santana; Starr; Richmond Rab; UnKasa; John Depp; Deniro; Riq Rose; Yung Ja; Hynief; Nick Haze; Big B'Z; SkullGizzy (Gamer)

Skull Gang was an American hip hop collective formed in 2007, by American rapper Juelz Santana. The group is best known for their projects Juelz Santana Presents Skull Gang: Takeover (2008) and Jim Jones & Skull Gang Present a Tribute to Bad Santa (2008). Skull Gang released their only album Skull Gang on May 5, 2009. The "skull" in Skull Gang is an acronym which stands for "Street Kids United by Loyalty & Loot".

== Discography ==
=== Studio albums ===
Year	Album	Peak chart positions		
Year	Album	US	R&B	Rap
2009	Skull Gang: Released: May 5, 2009; Label: E1 Music	142	25	9

=== Compilation albums ===
Year	Title
2008	A Tribute to Bad Santa Starring Mike Epps: Released: November 25, 2008; Label: Splash, Koch

=== Mixtapes ===
Year	Album Julez Santana Present
2008	The Takeover": Released: September 19, 2008; Format: Free download

=== Singles ===
Year	Song	Chart positions			Album
Year	Song	U.S. Hot 100	U.S. R&B	U.S. Rap	Album
2009	"I Am the Club"	—	—	—	Skull Gang
