= Come Home with Me =

Studio album by Cam'ron
- Released: May 14, 2002
- Recorded: 2001–2002
- Studio: Manhattan Center Studios; Baseline Studios (New York, New York)
- Genre: Hip hop
- Length: 69:09
- Label: Diplomats; Roc-A-Fella; Island Def Jam
- Producer: Shawn Carter (exec.); Damon Dash (exec.); Kareem "Biggs" Burke (exec.); Ty Fyffe; Just Blaze; Precision; LeLan Robinson, Mike T, Ray Watkins; Rsonist; DR Period; Mafia Boy; Neek Rusher; Kanye West; BPM

Cam'ron chronology
S.D.E. (2000)	Come Home with Me (2002)	Purple Haze (2004)

Singles from Come Home with Me
- 1. "Oh Boy" Released: April 2, 2002; 2. "Hey Ma" Released: August 6, 2002; 3. "Daydreaming" Released: February 4, 2003

Come Home with Me is the third studio album by American rapper Cam'ron, released on May 14, 2002, by Cam'ron's Diplomat Records and Jay-Z's Roc-A-Fella Records, a division of UMG's The Island Def Jam Music Group. There are featured guest appearances from Jimmy Jones, Juelz Santana, Freekey Zekey, DJ Kay Slay, Daz Dillinger, Tiffany, Jay-Z, McGruff, Memphis Bleek, and Beanie Sigel. To date, it is his most commercially successful album; it peaked at #2 on the Billboard 200 with first-week sales of 226,000 copies, and eventually sold over one million copies in the United States, being certified Platinum by the RIAA.

Its two singles were "Oh Boy" (featuring Juelz Santana) and "Hey Ma" (featuring Juelz Santana, Freekey Zekey, and Toya). "Oh Boy" held the number one spot on the Hot R&B/Hip-Hop Singles for five straight weeks, the number one spot on the Hot Rap Tracks and peaked at number four on the Billboard Hot 100. The second hit was "Hey Ma", which reached number three on the Hot 100 and number eight on the UK Singles Chart, becoming his biggest hit. "Daydreaming" was a later single released in 2003 but failed to duplicate the success from his earlier singles.

== Background ==
The album was originally scheduled for a March 2002 release under the title Blow. The majority of the album was recorded while Cam'ron was still signed to Epic Records.

== Critical reception ==
Professional ratings
Review scores
Source	Rating
AllMusic	4/5 stars
RapReviews	7/10
Rolling Stone	3/5 stars
The Source	3.5/5 stars
Vibe	3.5/5 stars

AllMusic's Jason Birchmeier praised Cam's presence throughout the record and Just Blaze supplying him with beats that strengthen him on "Oh Boy" and "The Roc (Just Fire)", concluding that "Overall, Cam'ron couldn't return with a stronger comeback album than this: he's affiliated with one of the industry's most successful labels, graced with a hot producer, and armed with a dynamite single." Steve 'Flash' Juon of RapReviews felt the pairing of Cam with Roc-A-Fella's team of featured artists and producers helped utilize his rap flow to its potential by crafting quality tracks with a "slamming assembly of b-boy beats" despite a few duds in "Live My Life" and the title track, concluding that "For the beats though, and for some of Cam'Ron's best rhymes to date, Come Home with Me will be a summer anthem album for Harlemites and Roc-A-Fella Records ryders alike." Jon Caramanica, writing for Rolling Stone, commended Cam's unique lyrical abilities but felt the stories he delivered about drugs and women were half-hearted and lacked charisma, and only partially worked when the production gave them "the substance and emotional center they otherwise lack."

== Track listing ==
Come Home with Me track listing
No.	Title	Writer(s)	Producer(s)	Length
1.	"Intro" (featuring Kay Slay)	Cameron Giles; Tyrone Fyffe; Norman Harris; Ron Tyson	Ty Fyffe	2:44
2.	"Losing Weight, Pt. 2" (featuring Juelz Santana)	Giles; Justin Smith; LaRon James	Just Blaze	6:06
3.	"Oh Boy" (featuring Juelz Santana)	Giles; Smith; James; Norman Whitfield	Just Blaze	3:24
4.	"Live My Life (Leave Me Alone)" (featuring Daz Dillinger)	Giles; Larry Gates; Delmar Arnaud; Tupac Shakur; Lawrence Parker; Bryan Chandler; Alan Lomax; Eric Burdon; Rodney Lemay	Precision	3:11
5.	"Daydreaming" (featuring Tiffany)	Giles; LeLan Robinson; Ray Watkins; Aretha Franklin	Ray Watkins; LeLan Robinson; Mike T	6:29
6.	"Come Home with Me" (featuring Juelz Santana & Jimmy Jones)	Giles; Fyffe; Gregory Green; Sean Thomas; James; Joseph Jones; George Stanley Clinton	Ty Fyffe; Heat Makers	5:01
7.	"Welcome to New York City" (featuring Jay-Z & Juelz Santana)	Giles; Shawn Carter; Smith	Just Blaze	5:09
8.	"Hey Ma" (featuring Juelz Santana, Freekey Zekey & Toya)	Giles; Darryl Pittman; James; Lionel Richie	DR Period; Mafia Boy	3:40
9.	"On Fire Tonight" (featuring Freekey Zekey)	Giles; Fyffe; James Mtume; Barbara Acklin; Eugene Record	Ty Fyffe	5:40
10.	"Stop Calling" (featuring McGruff & Freekey Zekey)	Giles; Fyffe	Ty Fyffe	6:06
11.	"I Just Wanna" (featuring Juelz Santana)	Giles; Fyffe; Dashawn Hamilton; James; D'Angelo; Raphael Saadiq	Ty Fyffe; Neek Rusher	4:09
12.	"Dead or Alive" (featuring Jimmy Jones)	Giles; Kanye West; Jones; Buffy Sainte-Marie	Kanye West	4:07
13.	"The ROC (Just Fire)" (featuring Memphis Bleek & Beanie Sigel)	Giles; Smith; Malik Cox; Dwight Grant	Just Blaze	4:24
14.	"Boy Boy"	Giles; Fyffe; Green; Thomas	Ty Fyffe; Heat Makers	4:43
15.	"Tomorrow"	Giles; M. DuVert; Eric Roberson; Eldra DeBarge	BPM	4:20
Total length:				69:09

Sample credits

- "Intro" contains excerpts from "Oscar" (aka "You Should Get an Oscar"), written by Norman Harris and Ron Tyson, and performed by Blue Magic.
- "Oh Boy" contains excerpts from "I'm Going Down, written by Norman Whitfield, and performed by Rose Royce.
- "Live My Life (Leave Me Alone)" embodies portions of
  - "Ambitionz az a Ridah", written by Delmar Arnaud and Tupac Shakur.
  - Sound of da Police, written by Lawrence Parker, Bryan Chandler, Alan Lomax, Eric Burdon, and Rodney Lemay.
- "Daydreaming" contains interpolations from the composition "Day Dreaming" written by Aretha Franklin.
- "Come Home with Me" contains excerpts from the composition "She Is My Lady", written by George Stanley Clinton.
- "Hey Ma" contains excerpts from "Easy", written by Lionel Richie, and performed by Commodores.
- "On Fire Tonight"
  - Contains interpolations of "Have You Seen Her", written by Barbara Acklin and Eugene Record.
  - Contains samples from "You, Me and He", written by James Mtume, and performed by Mtume.
- "I Just Wanna" contains excerpts from "Untitled (How Does It Feel)", written by D'Angelo and Raphael Saadiq, and performed by D'Angelo.
- "Dead or Alive" contains excerpts from "Lazarus", written and performed by Buffy Saint-Marie.
- "The ROC (Just Fire)" contains excerpts from the composition and sound recording "Warlock" by Tilsley Orchestral.
- "Tomorrow" contains interpolations from "Love Me in a Special Way", written by El DeBarge.

== Charts and certifications ==
=== Weekly charts ===
Chart (2002)	Peak position
Canadian Albums (Nielsen SoundScan)	45
Canadian R&B Albums (Nielsen SoundScan)	8
US Billboard 200	2
US Top R&B/Hip-Hop Albums (Billboard)	1

=== Year-end charts ===
Chart (2002)	Position
Canadian R&B Albums (Nielsen SoundScan)	59
Canadian Rap Albums (Nielsen SoundScan)	31
US Billboard 200	66
US Top R&B/Hip-Hop Albums (Billboard)	13

=== Certifications ===
Region	Certification	Certified units/sales
United Kingdom (BPI)	Silver	60,000^{*}
United States (RIAA)	Platinum	1,000,000^{^}
^{*} Sales figures based on certification alone.^{^} Shipments figures based on certification alone.
