= Skull Gang Entertainment =

- Founded: 2008
- Founder: Juelz Santana CEO and President
- Distributor: Koch
- Genre: Hip hop
- Country of origin: United States
- Location: New York City, New York
- Official website: www.skullgangonline.com

Skull Gang Entertainment is a hip-hop label formed by Skull Gang member Juelz Santana in 2008. With his usual crew on hold due to infighting and his solo career tied up in contract disputes, Dipset member Juelz Santana formed his own group, Skull Gang, in 2008. Featuring Santana along with Richmond Rab, Starr, Unkasa, John Depp, Deniro, and Riq Rose, the crew first appeared on the mixtape Takeover: The New Movement to Move With released in 2008. A year later, many of the tracks ended up on the group's self-titled debut album released by the E-1 label. In 2011 Juelz Santana will release his second studio album in a joint venture 50/50 with Def Jam on June 15.

== Skull Gang ==
In 2008 Juelz Santana created a group known as Skull Gang. The group consists of Richmond Rab, Starr, Unkasa, John Depp, Deniro, and Riq Rose. They released a solo album, also known as Skull Gang, which debuted at number 145 at US Billboard 200. Also they released a lot of mixtapes and have a collaboration album with Mike Epps and Jim Jones called Bad Santa.

== Discography ==
Albums

Year	Album	Peak chart positions		
Year	Album	US	R&B	Rap
2009	Skull Gang: Released: May 5, 2009; Label: Skull Gang Entertainment/E1 Music	142	25	9

Mixtapes

Year	Album
2008	Skull Gang Takeover "The New Movement To Move Wit": Released: September 19, 2008; Format: Free download

Solo albums

Juelz Santana

Year	Title	Chart positions			Sales and certifications
Year	Title	U.S.	U.S. R&B	U.S. Rap	Sales and certifications
2011	Born to Lose, Built to Win: Third Studio Album; Released: Unknown; Label: Skull Gang Entertainment/Def Jam/Diplomat	-	-	-	Sales: -; RIAA: -
