= Lumidee discography =

- Studio albums: 2
- Singles: 10
- Music videos: 11

The discography of Lumidee, a Puerto Rican-American hip hop and R&B recording artist, consists of ten singles, eleven music videos, two studio albums and some other appearances.

Lumidee quickly rose to fame during the summer of 2003 with the release of her debut single, "Never Leave You (Uh Oooh, Uh Oooh)", which was her only hit until the 2007 release of "She's Like the Wind". On June 23, 2003, she released her debut album, Almost Famous. For the next few years, Lumidee was not in the mainstream music industry in the US, instead veering more towards reggaeton and dancehall music. After her hit single "Never Leave You", Lumidee went overseas to continue her musical career in Belgium, Germany, France and the Netherlands.

On April 17, 2007, Lumidee released her second album Unexpected, which was released under TVT Records. The US single "She's Like the Wind" peaked at 43, but it was not released in Europe. There, the label released the single "Crazy" featuring Pitbull, which experienced moderate chart success in Germany, Austria and the UK.

== Albums ==
=== Studio albums ===
Title	Details	Chart positions						
Title	Details	US	US R&B	UK	SWI	GER	FRA	NLD
Almost Famous	Released: 2003	22	73	70	24	37	148	37
Unexpected	Released: 2007	44	14	—	65	—	—	—
10 13	Released: 2021	—	—	—	—	—	—	—
"—" denotes a title that did not chart, or was not released in that territory.

=== Mixtapes ===
- I'm Up, Vol. 1 (2009)
- Coast 2 Coast Exclusive, Vol. 2 (2009)
- Lumi (2014)

== Singles ==
=== As lead artist ===
List of singles, with selected chart positions
Title	Year	Peak chart positions							Certifications	Album
Title	Year	US	US R&B	AUS	UK	NLD	BEL	IRE	Certifications	Album
"Never Leave You (Uh Oooh, Uh Oooh)"	2003	3	9	33	2	1	1	17	BRMA: Gold; BPI: Silver; BVMI: Gold; IFPI SWI: Gold	Almost Famous
"Crashin' a Party" (featuring N.O.R.E.)	2003	—	—	—	55	—	—	—		Almost Famous
"Dance!" (Lumidee featuring Fatman Scoop)	2006	—	—	60	—	70	35	—		FIFA World Cup 2006 Soundtrack
"She's Like the Wind" (featuring Tony Sunshine)	2007	43	75	—	—	—	1	—		Unexpected
"Crazy" (featuring Pitbull)	2007	—	—	—	74	—	35	—		Unexpected
"Feel Like Makin' Love" (featuring Shaggy)	2007	—	—	—	—	—	—	—		Unexpected
"Mars" (featuring Bodega Bamz)	2014	—	—	—	—	—	—	—		
"Be Good" (featuring Dave East)	2016	—	—	—	—	—	—	—		
"—" denotes a title that did not chart, or was not released in that territory.

=== As featured artist ===
Year	Title	Chart positions						Album
Year	Title	NLD	BEL	IRE	GER	SWI	AUT	Album
"Die besten Tage sind gezählt" (Kool Savas featuring Lumidee)	2004	—	—	—	32	91	—	Die besten Tage sind gezählt
"From Spanish Harlem to Geneva" (Nega featuring Lumidee and Jae'son)	2004	—	—	—	—	58	—	Mémoires Éscrites
"Siéntelo" (Speedy featuring Lumidee)	2005	3	1	—	—	10	—	Nueva Generación
"Don't Sweat That (Whistle Song)" (Dr. Stay Dry featuring Lumidee)	2008	—	—	—	—	—	45	
"Kandi" (Arash featuring Lumidee)	2009	—	—	—	—	—	—	Donya
"No Superstar" (Remady featuring Lumidee and Chase Manhattan)	2010	—	—	—	74	—	—	
"Boom Rakatak" (Ardian Bujupi and DJ Mase featuring Big Ali and Lumidee)	2014	—	—	—	60	—	—	Ardicted
"—" denotes a title that did not chart, or was not released in that territory.

== Album appearances ==
Title	Year	Album
"Amazed" (DJ Tedsmooth Reggae Mix) (Angelo Venuto featuring Lumidee)	2013	Un Amore: One Love
"Más Maíz" (N.O.R.E. featuring Nina Sky, Big Mato, La Negra of LDA, Fat Joe, Lumidee, Chingo Bling and Lil Rob)	2006	N.O.R.E. y la Familia...Ya Tú Sabe
"Come Clean 2006" (Kool Savas featuring Lumidee and DJ Suave)	2006	Optik Takeover!
"Grind It Up" (Toby Love featuring Lumidee)	2008	Chosen Few, Vol. 3: The Movie Soundtrack
"Let Go" (Corina featuring Lumidee)	2008	
"Enur's Bonfire" (Remix) (Enur featuring Natasja and Lumidee)	2008	Enur's Bonfire EP
"Loko" (Mysonne featuring Cory Gunz and Lumidee)	2012	The Definition of a G 2

== Music videos ==
Title	Year	Director
"Never Leave You (Uh Oooh, Uh Oooh)" (Remix) (Lumidee featuring Busta Rhymes and Fabolous)	2003	Nzingha Stewart
"Crashin' a Party" (Lumidee featuring N.O.R.E.)	2004	
"Crashin' a Party" (Remix) (Lumidee featuring Kool Savas and N.O.R.E.)	2004	
"Die besten Tage sind gezählt" (Kool Savas featuring Lumidee)	2004	
"Siéntelo" (Speedy featuring Lumidee)	2005	
"Dance!" (Goleo VI presents Lumidee featuring Fatman Scoop)	2006	
"She's Like the Wind" (Lumidee featuring Tony Sunshine)	2007	Dayo
"Crazy" (Lumidee featuring Pitbull)	2007	Dale Resteghini
"Feel Like Makin' Love" (Lumidee featuring Shaggy)	2007	Denis Thybaud
"Passin' Thru"	2007	The ICU Lab
"Kandi" (Arash featuring Lumidee)	2009	Fred Khoshtinat
