= Bounce Along =

Single by Wayne Wonder

from the album No Holding Back
- Released: October 27, 2003
- Recorded: 2002
- Genre: Reggae fusion, dancehall
- Length: 4:50
- Label: Atlantic, VP
- Songwriters: Steven Marsden, V.W. Charles, Paul Edmund
- Producer: Steven Marsden

Wayne Wonder singles chronology
"No Letting Go" (2003)	"Bounce Along" (2003)	"Hold Me Now" (2004)

"Bounce Along" is a reggae fusion song recorded by Jamaican singer Wayne Wonder. The song was written by Steven Marsden and V.W. Charles and Paul Edmund and produced by Marsden. It was included on Wonder's 2003 studio album No Holding Back and was released as the second single from the album. The single was released in October 2003 and charted at a peak position of number nineteen in the United Kingdom.

== Music video ==
The music video was directed by Kevin DeFreitas and premiered in mid-2003.

== Chart performance ==
Chart (2003–2004)	Peak position
Belgium (Ultratip Bubbling Under Flanders)	10
Belgium (Ultratip Bubbling Under Wallonia)	17
Netherlands (Single Top 100)	69
Romania (Romanian Top 100)	86
Scotland Singles (OCC)	42
Switzerland (Schweizer Hitparade)	42
UK Hip Hop/R&B (OCC)	5
UK Singles (OCC)	19
