= Diwali Riddim =

2002 compilation album by various artists

Greensleeves Rhythm Album #27: Diwali

Compilation album by Various artists
- Released: May 21, 2002; May 25, 2010 (Gold Edition)
- Recorded: 2002
- Genre: Dancehall; reggae fusion
- Length: 64:20
- Label: Greensleeves
- Producer: Steven "Lenky" Marsden

Various artists chronology
Hard Drive (2002)	Greensleeves Rhythm Album #27: Diwali (2002)	Hard Drive Pt. 2 (2002)

Alternative cover
- Gold Edition, 2010

Professional ratings
Review scores
Source	Rating
AllMusic	3/5 stars

Greensleeves Rhythm Album #27: Diwali, also known as the Diwali Riddim, is an album and popular dancehall riddim that came to prominence in 2002 from Jamaican producer Steven Marsden.

== Description ==
The riddim is credited to Jamaican producer Steven "Lenky" Marsden. This has appeared on several international hit songs by Sean Paul, Bounty Killer, Elephant Man, Lumidee, Brick & Lace (although their single "Love Is Wicked" was not released until 2007), and Wayne Wonder. The New York Times described the song as "one of the most popular reggae rhythms of all time, spawning hits, sequels and – inevitably – rip-offs. If ever there was a beat that deserved its own Behind the Music, this is it." Similarly, the album was heralded as the best reggae album released in 2002.

It is recognized as arguably the most prominent and popular riddim of 2002 based on the number of top-ten hit songs that charted in Jamaica or internationally that used the instrumental, such as "Get Busy", "No Letting Go", "Never Leave You (Uh Oooh, Uh Oooh)", "Overcome", "Elephant Message", "Sufferer", "Party Time", and "Love Is Wicked". To this day, the riddim and the songs sampling it are still played on Jamaican radio stations every so often and is considered a classic.

The beat is characterized by syncopated clapping, and it was given the name Diwali for its Indian dance-music influence. The riddim has been featured in American television commercials via Sean Paul's song "Get Busy".

== List of songs using Diwali Riddim ==
Artist	Song	Album
Amr Diab	"Lealy Nahary"	Lealy Nahary
Anthony B	"Girls Buss"	Greensleeves Rhythm Album #27: Diwali
Assassin	"Ruffest & Tuffest"	Greensleeves Rhythm Album #27: Diwali
Beenie Man	"That's Right"	Greensleeves Rhythm Album #27: Diwali
Beenie Man	"War Is Over"	
Bounty Killer feat. Wayne Marshall	"Sufferer"	Greensleeves Rhythm Album #27: Diwali
Bling Dawg	"All Right for You"	
Brick & Lace	"Love Is Wicked"	Love Is Wicked
Buju Banton	"Tra La La"	
Captain Jack	"Capitano"	Greatest Hits
Cecile	"Respect Yuh Wife"	Greensleeves Rhythm Album #27: Diwali
Crissy D	"Make It Real Good"	Greensleeves Rhythm Album #27: Diwali
Danny English & Egg Nog	"Party Time"	Greensleeves Rhythm Album #27: Diwali
Darkoo ft. Dess Dior	“Favourite Girl”	
Diwali	"XM24 Version"	Greensleeves Rhythm Album #27: Diwali
Elephant Man	"Elephant Message"	Higher Level / Greensleeves Rhythm Album #27: Diwali
General Degree	"Inna"	Greensleeves Rhythm Album #27: Diwali
Hawkeye	"Bubble & Wine"	
Lumidee	"Never Leave You" (slightly altered from the original riddim), produced by DJ Tedsmooth & Trendsetta	Almost Famous/Greensleeves Rhythm Album #27: Diwali (Gold Edition)
Madd Anju	"Dem Ago Hard"	
MC Solaar	"Hijo de Africa"	Mach 6
Mega Banton	"It's OK"	Greensleeves Rhythm Album #27: Diwali
Mika	"Lollipop"	Life in Cartoon Motion
Missy Elliott	"Pass That Dutch"	This Is Not a Test!
Mr Reggaenarator	"Art de Rue Police (Police Freak)"	
Rihanna	"Pon de Replay"	Music of the Sun
Sauti Sol	"Shake Yo Bam Bam"	Live and Die in Afrika
Sean Paul	"Get Busy"	Dutty Rock / Greensleeves Rhythm Album #27: Diwali (Gold Edition)
Spragga Benz	"Da One"	
Shakti	"Ay Yo!"	
Sheikh Terra & the Soul Salah Crew	"Dirty Kuffar"	
Tanya Stephens	"Can't Touch Me No More"	Greensleeves Rhythm Album #27: Diwali
T.O.K.	"Galang Gal"	Unknown Language / Greensleeves Rhythm Album #27: Diwali
Wayne Marshall	"Overcome"	Greensleeves Rhythm Album #27: Diwali
Wayne Wonder	"No Letting Go"	No Holding Back
WSTRN	"Night & Day"	WSTRN Season, Vol. 2
Zumjay	"Zumjay Is My Name"	Greensleeves Rhythm Album #27: Diwali
Spragga Benz	"Gonna Fight"	
Tiwa Savage	"Without My Heart" feat. Don Jazzy	Once Upon a Time
Wizkid	"London Girl"	Empire Mates State of Mind
M.O.G. (Men of God)	"Let Him Go"	
Omarion	"W4W Word for Word"	
Odunsi (The Engine)	"In the Morning"	
Tory Lanez	"Come Back to Me"	
World Famous DJ FINAL	"Moods (Diwali Remix)"	Caramel Music

== Charts ==
=== Weekly charts ===
Chart (2002)	Peak position
US Reggae Albums (Billboard)	7

=== Year-end charts ===
Chart (2003)	Position
US Reggae Albums (Billboard)	4
