= Siéntelo =

Single by Speedy featuring Lumidee

from the album Nueva Generación
- Released: 6 June 2003
- Genre: Reggaeton
- Length: 2:52
- Label: EMI
- Songwriter: Juan Garcia
- Producer: DJ Blass

Speedy singles chronology
"Te Quiero Mi Yal" (2004)	"Siéntelo" (2003)	"Hora De Baile" (2005)

Lumidee singles chronology
"Die Besten Tage Sind Gezählt" (2004)	"Siéntelo" (2004)	"Dance!" (2006)

"Siéntelo" is a single released by Puerto Rican recording artist Speedy, from his third album, Nueva Generación (2005). It features American recording artist Lumidee. The song was originally released without Lumidee on DJ Blass' 2001 album Sandunguero.

== Track listing ==
CD-Single

1. Siéntelo (Motivo Short Mix) – 2:54
2. Siéntelo (Motivo Long Mix) – 4:37
3. Siéntelo (Motivo Short Mix) – 3:08
4. Siéntelo (Motivo Long Mix) – 4:18
5. Siéntelo (Extended Mix) – 3:48
6. Siéntelo (DJ Blass Mix) – 2:37

== Chart performance ==
=== Weekly charts ===
Chart (2004–2005)	Peak position
Austria (Ö3 Austria Top 40)	22
Belgium (Ultratop 50 Flanders)	11
Belgium (Ultratop 50 Wallonia)	5
European Hot 100 Singles	40
Finland (Suomen virallinen lista)	10
France (SNEP)	8
Germany (GfK)	13
Italy (FIMI)	32
Netherlands (Dutch Top 40)	3
Netherlands (Mega Single Top 100)	3
Sweden (Sverigetopplistan)	41
Switzerland (Media Control AG)	10

=== Year-end charts ===
Chart (2005)	Position
Belgium (Ultratop Wallonia)	95
Germany (Official German Charts)	72
Netherlands (Dutch Top 40)	44
Netherlands (Single Top 100)	43
Switzerland (Schweizer Hitparade)	90
