= I'm Up =

I'm Up may refer to:

== Albums ==
- I'm Up, Vol. 1, 2009 mixtape by Lumidee
- I'm Up (Gucci Mane mixtape), 2012
- I'm Up (Young Thug mixtape), 2016

== Songs ==
- "I'm Up", a song by Lumidee from her 2007 album Unexpected
- "I'm Up" (song), a 2015 single by Omarion ft. French Montana and Kid Ink
- "I'm Up", a song by YoungBoy Never Broke Again from his 2020 album Top
- "I'm Up", a song by Nav from the album Brown Boy 2
