= List of Dutch Top 40 number-one singles of 2003 =

These hits topped the Dutch Top 40 in 2003 (see 2003 in music).

Issue date	Artist(s)	Song
4 January	Robbie Williams	"Feel"
11 January	Eminem	"Lose Yourself"
18 January	Eminem	"Lose Yourself"
25 January	Eminem	"Lose Yourself"
1 February	Eminem	"Lose Yourself"
8 February	Blue and Elton John	"Sorry Seems to Be the Hardest Word"
15 February	Blue and Elton John	"Sorry Seems to Be the Hardest Word"
22 February	Blue and Elton John	"Sorry Seems to Be the Hardest Word"
1 March	Blue and Elton John	"Sorry Seems to Be the Hardest Word"
8 March	Blue and Elton John	"Sorry Seems to Be the Hardest Word"
15 March	Gareth Gates	"Anyone of Us (Stupid Mistake)"
22 March	Gareth Gates	"Anyone of Us (Stupid Mistake)"
29 March	Jamaï	"Step Right Up"
5 April	Jamaï	"Step Right Up"
12 April	Jamaï	"Step Right Up"
19 April	Jamaï	"Step Right Up"
26 April	Jamaï	"Step Right Up"
3 May	Jamaï	"Step Right Up"
10 May	Jamaï	"Step Right Up"
17 May	Jim	"Tell Her"
24 May	Jim	"Tell Her"
31 May	Jim	"Tell Her"
7 June	Sean Paul	"Get Busy"
14 June	The Underdog Project and The Sunclub	"Summer Jam 2003"
21 June	The Underdog Project and The Sunclub	"Summer Jam 2003"
28 June	The Underdog Project and The Sunclub	"Summer Jam 2003"
5 July	The Underdog Project and The Sunclub	"Summer Jam 2003"
12 July	The Underdog Project and The Sunclub	"Summer Jam 2003"
19 July	The Underdog Project and The Sunclub	"Summer Jam 2003"
26 July	The Underdog Project and The Sunclub	"Summer Jam 2003"
2 August	The Underdog Project and The Sunclub	"Summer Jam 2003"
9 August	The Underdog Project and The Sunclub	"Summer Jam 2003"
16 August	Lumidee	"Never Leave You (Uh Oooh, Uh Oooh)"
23 August	Lumidee	"Never Leave You (Uh Oooh, Uh Oooh)"
30 August	Lumidee	"Never Leave You (Uh Oooh, Uh Oooh)"
6 September	Lumidee	"Never Leave You (Uh Oooh, Uh Oooh)"
13 September	Outlandish	"Aïcha"
20 September	Outlandish	"Aïcha"
27 September	The Black Eyed Peas	"Where Is the Love?"
4 October	The Black Eyed Peas	"Where Is the Love?"
11 October	Nena and Kim Wilde	"Anyplace, Anywhere, Anytime"
18 October	Nena and Kim Wilde	"Anyplace, Anywhere, Anytime"
25 October	Nena and Kim Wilde	"Anyplace, Anywhere, Anytime"
1 November	Nena and Kim Wilde	"Anyplace, Anywhere, Anytime"
8 November	Nena and Kim Wilde	"Anyplace, Anywhere, Anytime"
15 November	Ch!pz	"Cowboy"
22 November	Ch!pz	"Cowboy"
29 November	Ch!pz	"Cowboy"
6 December	Frans Bauer	"Heb je even voor mij"
13 December	Frans Bauer	"Heb je even voor mij"
20 December	Marco Borsato	"Afscheid nemen bestaat niet"
27 December	Marco Borsato	"Afscheid nemen bestaat niet"

== See also ==
- 2003 in music
