= List of European number-one hits of 2003 =

This is a list of the European Hot 100 Singles and European Top 100 Albums number ones of 2003. After Music & Media ceased in August 2003, Billboard took over publication of both pan-European charts.

== Chart history ==
Key
†	Indicates best-performing single and album of 2003

Issue date	Song	Artist	Album	Artist	Ref.
4 January	"Lose Yourself" †	Eminem	Escapology	Robbie Williams	
11 January	"The Ketchup Song (Aserejé)"	Las Ketchup	Escapology	Robbie Williams	
18 January	"Lose Yourself" †	Eminem	Escapology	Robbie Williams	
25 January	"Lose Yourself" †	Eminem	Escapology	Robbie Williams	
1 February	"Lose Yourself" †	Eminem	Escapology	Robbie Williams	
8 February	"Lose Yourself" †	Eminem	Escapology	Robbie Williams	
15 February	"All the Things She Said"	t.A.T.u.	Escapology	Robbie Williams	
22 February	"All the Things She Said"	t.A.T.u.	Escapology	Robbie Williams	
1 March	"All the Things She Said"	t.A.T.u.	100th Window	Massive Attack	
8 March	"All the Things She Said"	t.A.T.u.	100th Window	Massive Attack	
15 March	"All the Things She Said"	t.A.T.u.	Come Away with Me †	Norah Jones	
22 March	"Lose Yourself" †	Eminem	Come Away with Me †	Norah Jones	
29 March	"Lose Yourself" †	Eminem	Come Away with Me †	Norah Jones	
5 April	"Lose Yourself" †	Eminem	Come Away with Me †	Norah Jones	
12 April	"Lose Yourself" †	Eminem	Meteora	Linkin Park	
19 April	"In da Club"	50 Cent	Meteora	Linkin Park	
26 April	"In da Club"	50 Cent	Meteora	Linkin Park	
3 May	"In da Club"	50 Cent	Meteora	Linkin Park	
10 May	"In da Club"	50 Cent	American Life	Madonna	
17 May	"In da Club"	50 Cent	American Life	Madonna	
24 May	"In da Club"	50 Cent	American Life	Madonna	
31 May	"In da Club"	50 Cent	The Golden Age of Grotesque	Marilyn Manson	
7 June	"In da Club"	50 Cent	Fallen	Evanescence	
14 June	"I Know What You Want"	Busta Rhymes and Mariah Carey featuring The Flipmode Squad	Fallen	Evanescence	
21 June	"Bring Me to Life"	Evanescence	St. Anger	Metallica	
28 June	"Bring Me to Life"	Evanescence	St. Anger	Metallica	
5 July	"Bring Me to Life"	Evanescence	St. Anger	Metallica	
12 July	"Bring Me to Life"	Evanescence	St. Anger	Metallica	
19 July	"Bring Me to Life"	Evanescence	St. Anger	Metallica	
26 July	"Crazy in Love"	Beyoncé featuring Jay-Z	St. Anger	Metallica	
2 August	"Crazy in Love"	Beyoncé featuring Jay-Z	Dangerously in Love	Beyoncé	
9 August	"Crazy in Love"	Beyoncé featuring Jay-Z	Dangerously in Love	Beyoncé	
6 August (Note: Starting with the issue dated 16 August 2003, Billboard became the sole publisher of the pan-European charts after Music & Media ceased. When appearing on Billboard, the pan-European charts are dated 10 days before the magazine's issue date.)	"Crazy in Love"	Beyoncé featuring Jay-Z	Dangerously in Love	Beyoncé	
13 August	"Bring Me to Life"	Evanescence	Fallen	Evanescence	
20 August	"Never Leave You (Uh Oooh, Uh Oooh)"	Lumidee	Fallen	Evanescence	
27 August	"Never Leave You (Uh Oooh, Uh Oooh)"	Lumidee	Fallen	Evanescence	
3 September	"Breathe"	Blu Cantrell featuring Sean Paul	Fallen	Evanescence	
10 September	"Never Leave You (Uh Ooh, Uh Oooh)"	Lumidee	Fallen	Evanescence	
17 September	"White Flag"	Dido	Dance of Death	Iron Maiden	
24 September	"White Flag"	Dido	Reality	David Bowie	
1 October	"Where Is the Love?"	The Black Eyed Peas	Sacred Love	Sting	
8 October	"Where Is the Love?"	The Black Eyed Peas	Life for Rent	Dido	
14 October	"Where Is the Love?"	The Black Eyed Peas	Life for Rent	Dido	
22 October	"Where Is the Love?"	The Black Eyed Peas	Life for Rent	Dido	
29 October	"Where Is the Love?"	The Black Eyed Peas	Life for Rent	Dido	
5 November	"Where Is the Love?"	The Black Eyed Peas	Life for Rent	Dido	
12 November	"Where Is the Love?"	The Black Eyed Peas	Life for Rent	Dido	
19 November	"Me Against the Music"	Britney Spears featuring Madonna	Life for Rent	Dido	
26 November	"Me Against the Music"	Britney Spears featuring Madonna	Life for Rent	Dido	
3 December	"Me Against the Music"	Britney Spears featuring Madonna	Life for Rent	Dido	
10 December	"Shut Up"	The Black Eyed Peas	Life for Rent	Dido	
17 December	"Shut Up"	The Black Eyed Peas	Life for Rent	Dido	
24 December	"Shut Up"	The Black Eyed Peas	Life for Rent	Dido	
31 December	"Shut Up"	The Black Eyed Peas	Life for Rent	Dido	
