= Dando Cocotazos =

Studio album by Speedy
- Released: November 18, 2003
- Genre: Reggaeton
- Labels: Pina Records, Universal Music Latino

Speedy chronology
Haciendo El Amor Con La Ropa (2001)	Dando Cocotazos (2003)	Nueva Generación (2005)

Dando Cocotazos is a reggaeton album by artist Sir Speedy, released in November 2003. The album contains 14 tracks and was released on the Pina Records label. Appearances are made by Blade Pacino, DJ Blass (Vladimir Félix), DJ Reggie (Raymond Rosario) and others.

== Track listing ==
1. Intro
2. Ayúdame Imaginar
3. No Te Me Quites (feat. Chaka y Benny)
4. Como Mi Nena No Hay (feat. Master Joe y O.G. Black)
5. Madre (feat. Gavilan)
6. No Creo Yo en Ti (feat. Lito & Polaco)
7. En Ti Me Paso Pensando (feat. Great Kilo)
8. Te Quiero Mi Yal
9. Tu Cuerpo Me Da Calor (feat. Jenay)
10. Te Odio
11. Cosas Divinas (feat. Alex y Gaby)
12. Tu Cuerpo Quiere Más (feat. Blade Pacino)
13. Mami (feat. Yaga y Mackie)
14. Esta Noche Quiero Yo (feat. Maicol y Manuel)
