= Dirty Kuffar =

2004 Islamist rap video

"Dirty Kuffar" is an 2004 Islamist rap video produced by Muslim British rappers Sheikh Terra and the Soul Salah Crew. The music video begins with a CNN video clip showing US troops shooting an Iraqi individual and then rejoicing; the clip is then followed by the logo "Digihad", playing on the terms digital and jihad. The beat of "Dirty Kuffar" is the "Diwali Riddim", also used in the popular Lumidee song "Never Leave You (Uh Oh)". The soldier being interviewed at the beginning of the video is allegedly called Riddle and was interviewed by CNN. The 'Digihad' logo has been spoofingly taken from the racist and White supremacist British Combat 18 website logo, only that the swastika has been removed.

== Video ==
The song is a rap/dancehall song that is underpinned by the much-used "Diwali Riddim". The video was posted on a British website run by the Islamic extremist Mohammad al-Massari, the UK-based Saudi Arabian dissident who has lived in Britain since 1994. Al-Massari claimed that the video had been selling in large quantities at mosques to the younger generation and was in heavy demand overseas. In 2004, al-Massari told the Guardian newspaper that he did not know a single young Muslim who has not either seen or got the video.

Al-Massari also stated that "It is selling everywhere. Everyone I meet at the mosque is asking for it." Al-Massari's Committee for the Defence of Legitimate Rights in Saudi Arabia—a group which came to Britain in 1994 to publicise injustices in the desert kingdom—also distributed the four-minute video on its website.

The rapper fronting the video calls himself Sheikh Terra and the Soul Salah Crew—a take on the rap group So Solid Crew. Salat is Arabic for "prayer". In the video, Nazis, the Ku Klux Klan, Tony Blair, Ronald Reagan, George W. Bush, Vladimir Putin, Ariel Sharon and Nick Griffin are the main "Dirty Kuffars". The video attacks Muslim political leaders like former Egyptian President Hosni Mubarak and former Pakistani President Pervez Musharraf as traitors to Islam. The video also featured Hamza Yusuf with the caption stating that he was one of the "Scholars for Dollars".

Screen shots from the video depict the singers wearing Palestinian keffiyehs around his head, atop a balaclava.

== Media exposure in the 2000s ==
"Dirty Kuffar" has been mentioned in the media and even internationally. The Globe and Mail on 17 August 2007 said that: "Since its release, 'Dirty Kuffar' has been downloaded onto millions of computers and remixed by many like-minded web jihadists. You can find it on video-sharing sites such as YouTube."

The news station Al-Jazeera reported on the phenomenon.

The Daily Times of Pakistan stated that "Al Qaeda's newest weapon against the West is a violent English-language rap tune".

The British National Party has stated that "More than a tiny minority of young British Muslims turned the 'Dirty Kuffar' rap video into a cult."

On 10 November 2004, former Jihadist Daveed Gartenstein-Ross, reviewed the song for Frontpage Magazine.

In 2005, "Dirty Kuffar" featured extensively in a programme called Media Jihad: As Sahab Foundation, a CBC programme based on a documentary originally produced in Japan by NHK and was updated by the Discovery Times Channel.

On 2 August 2005, the well-known Bronx artist DJ Damien released an internet-based tribute single in conjunction with Morcoq, entitled "Dirty Kuffar (Acoustic Tribute)". The lyrics follow the theme of the original, but in this version main Dirty Kuffars include Jacques Chirac and Lap Fung Chan.

On 27 November 2006, the BBC reported in Online Jihadism and exclusively featured the "Dirty Kuffar" rap video.

On 6 December 2006, Channel 4's Dispatches programme aired Jihad TV, a documentary investigating the fact that "Internet footage of beheadings has become a vital weapon in al-Qaeda's jihad against the West. Dispatches investigates this powerful propaganda machine and its impact on young Arabs and Muslims in the UK." In this show, the "Dirty Kuffar" video was extensively reviewed.

The 2006 documentary Obsession: Radical Islam's War Against the West featured "Dirty Kuffar" and discussed online jihad.

In 2007, The Daily Telegraph newspaper reported that the 21 July bombers appeared in court and it was witnessed that they had watched the video.

In January 2007, the "Dirty Kuffar" video was featured in the CNN Behind the Scenes series documentary The War Within about radical Islam in Britain.

The video also featured in the Fox News documentaries on radical Islam, Radical Islam: Terror in Its Own Words, and Obsession: The Threat of Radical Islam.

In May 2007, Digihad remixed "Dirty Kuffar", as version 2.1 and released it through the video sharing website YouTube and in March 2007 another video, "Dirty Takfiri" with Azzam the American was released. However, although not promoting "Dirty Kuffar", "Dirty Takfiri" was an anti-jihad video spoofing "Dirty Kuffar".

In July 2007, online news websites were featuring stories on Islamic extremism and jihad on the internet, mentioning "Dirty Kuffar", and on 18 August The Globe and Mail ran a story entitled "Terror goes digital. With Canadian help", reporting how popular the song still was.

In May 2008, Investor's Business Daily reported in the article "Google's TerrorTube" that: "Among the videos remaining on YouTube is a slick piece of pro-terrorist propaganda called 'Dirty Kuffar'."

== See also ==
- Fun Da Mental
- DAM (band)
- Mecca2Medina
- Al-Muhajiroun
- Omar Bakri Muhammad
- The Saved Sect
- Al Ghurabaa
- Abu Izzadeen
- Abu Uzair
- Abu Hamza al-Masri
- Controversies related to Islam and Muslims
