= DJ Blass =

Puerto Rican record producer (born 1978)

- Born: Vladimir Félix; December 1, 1978 (age 47); Guayama, Puerto Rico
- Occupation: Record producer
- Years active: 1998–present
- Musical career
- Genre: Reggaeton
- Label: Pina

Vladimir Félix (born December 1, 1978), known professionally as DJ Blass, is a Puerto Rican record producer. He has worked with renowned reggaeton artists such as Daddy Yankee, Nicky Jam, Speedy, Plan B and Wisin & Yandel. DJ Blass is a founding member of the Reggaeton Group @ria 51 whom created the style of music known as "Perreo" via their Reggaeton Sex productions.. DJ Blass is considered a pioneer in the development of the modern Reggaeton sound. He is noted for being among the first in bringing new fusions for the Reggaeton genre including influences from Electronic Music, Hip Hop, Dancehall Reggae and R&B. DJ Blass has produced renowned songs such as "Sientelo" by Lumidee & Speedy, "Latigazo" by Daddy Yankee, "Reggaeton" by J Balvin, "No Te Veo" by Casa De Leones, "Loco" from Jowell & Randy, "Dembow" by Yandel, "El Amor Con La Ropa" by Speedy and many others.

== Awards and nominations ==
List of awards and nominations received by DJ Blass
Ceremony	Year (Note: Indicates the year of ceremony. Each year is linked to the article about the awards held that year, wherever possible.)	Recipient	Category	Result	Ref.
Latin Grammy Awards	2011	"Te robaste mi corazón" (as producer)	Best Alternative Song	Nominated	

== Discography ==
=== Albums ===
==== Studio albums ====
List of studio albums, with selected details, and chart positions
Title	Details	Peaks
Title	Details	US Tropical
Sandunguero	Released: September 18, 2001; Label: Pina Records; Format: CD	1
Sandunguero 2	Released: August 2, 2003; Label: Pina; Format: CD	—
Lágrimas y risas	Released: 2004; Label: NJ Productions; Format: CD	—
Nuevas criaturas (with Rey Pirin)	Released: August 24, 2004; Label: MARR; Format: CD	—

==== Studio albums w/ @ria 51 ====
List of studio albums, with selected details, and chart positions
Title	Details	Peaks
Title	Details	US Tropical
@RIA 51 Aliados Al Escuadron	Released: 1999; Label: One Star; Format: CD	—
Reggaeton Sex Vol. II	Released: 2000; Label: One Star; Format: CD	—
Reggaeton Sex Vol. 3	Released: 2001; Label: One Star; Format: CD	—
Triple Sexxx	Released: 2001; Label: One Star; Format: CD	—
Reggaeton Sex Crew	Released: 2002; Label: One Star; Format: CD	

==== Compilation albums ====
List of compilation albums, with selected details
Title	Details
Sandunguero hits	Released: March 8, 2005; Label: Universal Latino, New Records Entertainment; Format: CD, digital download, streaming
