= Haciendo El Amor Con La Ropa =

Studio album by Speedy
- Released: January 17, 2001
- Genre: Reggaeton
- Label: One Star

Speedy chronology
Haciendo El Amor Con La Ropa (2001)	Dando Cocotazos (2003)

Haciendo El Amor Con La Ropa is the debut studio album by Speedy, released on January 17, 2001.

== Track listing ==
1. "Intro"
2. "Quiero Tu Cuerpo"
3. "Fin De Semana" (feat. Great Kilo)
4. "Muévete"
5. "Yo Quiero Darte" (feat. Yaga y Mackie)
6. "Ven Gata Ven" (feat. Rey Pirin)
7. "Con Un Arma"
8. "Para Que Bailen" (feat. Daddy Yankee)
9. "Girla"
10. "Mi Voz" (feat. Plan B)
11. "Te Deseo Mujer" (feat. Blade Pacino)
12. Mix by DJ Joe
13. Mix by DJ Blass
