= Twisted Nerve =

1968 British film by Roy Boulting

- Theatrical release poster
- Directed by: Roy Boulting
- Screenplay by: Roy Boulting; Leo Marks
- Story by: Roger Marshall
- Based on: idea by Marshall and Jeremy Scott
- Produced by: Frank Granat; George W. George executive John Boulting
- Starring: Hayley Mills; Hywel Bennett; Billie Whitelaw; Phyllis Calvert; Frank Finlay
- Cinematography: Harry Waxman
- Edited by: Martin Charles
- Music by: Bernard Herrmann
- Production company: Charter Film Productions
- Distributed by: British Lion Films
- Release date: 5 December 1968 (London)
- Running time: 118 minutes
- Country: United Kingdom
- Language: English

Twisted Nerve is a 1968 British psychological thriller horror film directed by Roy Boulting and starring Hywel Bennett, Hayley Mills, Billie Whitelaw and Frank Finlay. The film follows a disturbed young man, Martin, who pretends, under the name of Georgie, to be intellectually impaired in order to be near Susan, a girl with whom he has become infatuated. Martin kills those who get in his way.

== Plot ==
Martin plays catch with his older brother Pete, who has learning difficulties and has been sent to live in a special boarding school in London, by their mother. Martin is the only remaining figure in Pete's family life; their father died years before and their mother has a new life with her new husband, a wealthy banker. The school's physician believes that Pete cannot be expected to live much longer.

In a shop, Martin sees Susan purchase a toy. As she leaves, Martin follows after having pocketed a toy duck. Two store detectives ask them to return to the manager's office. The detectives assert that Martin and Susan were working together to steal the toy. Susan says she has never met Martin.

When questioned by the manager, Martin presents himself as mentally challenged, and calls himself "Georgie". Now disbelieving in a link between them, the manager asks Susan for her address, and Martin makes a mental note when she offers it. Sympathetic to him, Susan pays for Martin's toy.

Martin returns home and finds his parents arguing in the parlour, over his lack of interest in life, his unusual behaviour and the duck incident. In his room, now behaving as "Georgie", he rocks in a rocking chair while smiling in the mirror and caressing a stuffed animal. The rocking motion of the chair is smashing a photo of his stepfather.

The next day, Susan goes to the library, where she keeps an after-school job. Martin approaches Susan, who recognises him as Georgie. Martin says that he followed her, and pays her back for the toy. Before leaving, Martin gets Susan to lend him The Jungle Book.

Martin has a dispute with his stepfather, who insists he travel to Australia. Martin refuses and returns to his room. Martin stares in the mirror, bare-chested, and caresses himself. He then removes the rest of his clothes. There are male bodybuilding magazines on his dresser. A frustrated Martin eventually smashes the mirror.

Martin sets in motion a plan to leave home, pretending to go to France. He then shows up at Susan's mother's house, where she rents rooms. Presenting himself as Georgie, he gains sympathy both from Susan and her mother, who let him stay. Martin wants Susan to accept him as a lover, but cannot reveal that he is in fact Martin, as he is worried she will shun him.

One night, Martin steals scissors, leaves, and stabs his stepfather to death after the latter leaves a dinner party. The police investigate the murder and seek Martin for questioning.

Days later, Martin invites himself to tag along with Susan who is going for a swim at a country lake. There, Martin attempts to kiss Susan, who refuses his advances. Later at home, Susan searches Martin's room while cleaning and discovers books hidden in a drawer that a person with learning difficulties would not read or understand, as well as a book titled Know Yourself from Your Handwriting, in which signatures in the blank pages read 'Martin Durnley'.

Susan begins investigating Martin, talks with his mother, and realises that the two brothers are one and the same after seeing a photograph of Martin at the house. Susan visits her friend Shashee at a hospital where he works to question him about split personalities.

At Susan's house, Martin begins losing control over himself while suspecting that Susan may know who he really is. When Susan's neglected and unsuspecting mother attempts to sexually arouse Martin, he kills her with a hatchet.

When Susan arrives home, Martin holds her captive in his room after revealing his true persona. He forces Susan to undress so he can sexually fondle her, while her mother's body is found in the woodshed by Gerry Henderson, one of the "paying guests", who calls the police while Shashee learns the truth about Martin and races to the house to rescue Susan.

The police arrive and burst into Susan's room as Martin fires three times at his reflection in the mirror. While being taken away, he claims that he is Georgie and has killed Martin. Martin is confined in a cell at a mental hospital, ranting over his lost love Susan.

== Cast ==
- Hywel Bennett as Martin Durnley / Georgie
- Hayley Mills as Susan Harper
- Billie Whitelaw as Joan Harper
- Phyllis Calvert as Enid Durnley
- Frank Finlay as Henry Durnley
- Barry Foster as Gerry Henderson
- Salmaan Peer as Shashee Kadir
- Christian Roberts as Philip Harvey
- Gretchen Franklin as Clarkie
- Thorley Walters as Sir John Forrester
- Timothy West as Superintendent Dakin
- Russell Napier as Professor Fuller
- Timothy Bateson as Mr. Groom
- Richard Davies as Taffy Evans
- Basil Dignam as doctor
- Robin Parkinson as shop manager
- Marianne Stone as store detective 1
- John Harvey as store detective 2
- Mollie Maureen as lady patient
- Brian Peck as Det. Sgt. Rogers

== Production notes ==
In October 1967 John Boulting announced he would be making a film with Hayley Mills and Hywell Bennett who had just done The Family Way with the Boultings. They said a title had not been given to the film.

The film was produced by George W. George and Frank Granat, who had just made Pretty Polly with Hayley Mills. Filming began on 2 January 1968.

The film was a co-production between British Lion Films and a new American company, National General Pictures.

== Title ==
The title comes from the poem Slaves by George Sylvester Viereck (1884–1962) which is quoted twice in the movie, once during Professor Fuller's lecture on chromosome damage, and then as an audio flashback when Martin/Georgie is in a cell:

No puppet master pulls the strings on high
Proportioning our parts, the tinsel and the paint
A twisted nerve, a ganglion gone awry,
Predestinates the sinner and the saint.

Viereck's motives for his writing have been the subject of some discussion, and have further implications given the debate on eugenics during the middle of the 20th century, a subject somewhat alluded to in Professor Fuller's lecture in the film.

== Soundtrack ==
The film score was composed by Bernard Herrmann and features an eerie whistling tune. Stylotone Records reissued the score as part of a deluxe LP set, with a release date of 5 May 2016.

The theme was featured in Quentin Tarantino's Kill Bill: Vol. 1 (2003); and as characters' ringtones in Death Proof (2007), Chappa Kurishu (2011), and Chotushkone (2014); as well as in several episodes of the first season of American Horror Story (2011). More recently, it has also been used in Honda's 2015 car advertisement.

The theme was also sampled in a number of songs, including "Chill Bill" (Rob $tone), "The Hidden Interest" (Grooveman Jones), “Get Outta My Heart” (Ava Max), and “Don't Sweat That” (Lumidee).

== Release ==
=== Controversy ===
The film is notorious for its use of Down syndrome, then referred to as mongolism, as a catalyst for Martin's actions. Letters of complaint were sent to the British censor before the film's release, including one from the National Association for Mental Health. The film's medical adviser, Professor Lionel Penrose, asked for his name to be removed from the film. Roy Boulting said these complaints caused him "shock and surprise and a deep sense of regret and depression". This led to the filmmakers adding a voiceover just prior to the credits which said:

In view of the controversy already aroused, the producers of this film wish to re-emphasise what is already stated in the film, that there is no established scientific connection between mongolism and psychotic or criminal behaviour.

Even after that had been added, David Ennals, then a Minister of State, Health and Social Security, said: "I do not wish to criticise the film as a film. But I feel it is extremely unfortunate that despite the spoken disclaimer which precedes it, this film can give the impression that there is such a link."

As The New York Times put it, "this is a delicate area indeed", going on to describe the film as "more unsettling than rewarding, and certainly more contrived than compassionate".

=== Critical reception ===
The Monthly Film Bulletin wrote: "Small wonder that the makers of Twisted Nerve found it necessary to appease outraged medical opinion by adding an introduction to the film disclaiming any implied connection between mongolism and psychotic behaviour. The Boultings may have set out to make a serious comment on the plight of the mentally disordered, but what they have produced is a crudely sensationalist thriller decked out with some pseudoscientific jargon which suggests, intentionally or not, that the siblings of mongoloid children are likely to end up as homicidal maniacs. Any claim to seriousness is unequivocally nullified by Roy Boulting's bludgeoning approach to his already distasteful material ... But even viewed as a straightforward thriller, the film is so clumsily and predictably put together (witness the rash of timely coincidences in the climactic sequence) that the insurance company which has offered to pay out to the dependents of anyone dying of shock while watching it is hardly likely to find any clients. Billie Whitelaw (as the landlady) and Barry Foster (as a seedy film salesman decrying the trend towards sex and violence in the cinema, no less) apart, the performances are unremarkable: Hywel Bennett is baby-faced enough to make his childlike persona moderately convincing but can't manage the rest; and Hayley Mills shuffles through it all on a high-pitched monotone trying hard to look adult and concerned."

The Guardian called the film "gross, clumsy and ridiculously predictable."

The Observer called it "a glossy commercial psycho thriller which if it weren't for its pernicious implications would be perfectly horrifying" arguing the film would have been better had the character of the elder brother never existed. "Twisted Nerve is a fairly good blood chiller in its genre so long as it is clearly understood that it is a pack of lies."

The Los Angeles Times called it "thoroughly engrossing, spine tingling."

Filmink called it "not a very good movie in which Mills doesn’t have much to do except react – I think Boulting was trying to fashion her as a Hitchcock blonde but she’s very passive and the movie lacks the directorial flair of a Hitchcock, Seth Holt or Freddie Francis."
