= Be Good =

Be Good may refer to:

- Be Good (Alex Fong album), 2005
- Be Good (Gregory Porter album) or the title song, 2012
- "Be Good", a song by Lumidee, 2016
