= Stand Up (Dirty Werk song) =

"Stand UP"

Single by Dirty Werk
- Released: July 9, 2018
- Genre: EDM; House Music
- Length: 3:05
- Label: Fly House
- Songwriter(s): Steve Smooth; DJ Bam Bam
- Producer(s): Steve Smooth: DJ Bam Bam

Dirty Werk singles chronology
| "Spread love" (2017) | "Stand UP" (2018) | "No Letting Go" (2019) |

Steve Smooth singles chronology
| "Spread Love" (2017) | "Stand Up" (2018) | "No Letting Go" (2019) |

In 2018, the American House/Remix duo Dirty Werk released an electro dance version of "Stand Up", the song is largely a cover of Love Tribe's 1996 hit "Stand Up". The song became their first number one on Billboard's Dance Club Songs chart, reaching the summit in its September 22, 2018 issue.

== Track listing ==
Digital download: 1. Stand Up (Original Mix); 2. Stand Up (Nick Rockwell Remix); 3. Stand Up (Scotty Boy & Luca Debonaire Remix); 4. Stand Up (Lodato And Joseph Duveen Remix); 5. Stand Up (Freshcobar And Lavelle Dupree Remix); 6. Stand Up (Alex Acosta Remix)
| No. | Title | Length |

== Charts ==
=== Weekly charts ===
| Chart (2018) | Peak position |
|---|---|
| Dance Club Songs(Billboard) | 1 |

=== Year-end charts ===
| Chart (2018) | Peak position |
|---|---|
| Dance Club Songs(Billboard) | 12 |
