= Nueva Generación =

Studio album by Speedy
- Released: August 23, 2005
- Genre: Reggaeton

Speedy chronology
Dando Cocotazos (2003)	Nueva Generación (2005)	Mazakote Mixtape: Gold Edition Vol. 1 (2008)

Nueva Generación is a compilation album released by Puerto Rican reggaeton artist Speedy.

== Track listing ==
1. Siéntelo (Remix) (featuring Lumidee)
2. Metele Duro Mami
3. Amor Con la Ropa
4. Para Que Bailen (featuring Daddy Yankee)
5. Vamos Alla (featuring Great Kilo, Blade Pacino & Dj Blass)
6. Rosa
7. Ven Donde Mi
8. Quieres Bailar Reggaeton
9. Yales Danzan
10. De Todas las Veces (featuring Alex & Gaby)
11. Yo Quiero Darte (featuring Yaga y Mackie Ranks)
12. Girla
