= Unexpected (Lumidee album) =

Studio album by Lumidee
- Released: April 17, 2007
- Studios: Bassbumpers Studio; Eastside Sound; Icon Sound Studios (Miami, Florida); KMA Studios; Lumi's Closet; Platinum Sound Recording Studios (New York, New York)
- Length: 55:35
- Label: TVT
- Producers: Darrell Branch; Ron Browz; Jerry Duplessis; Wyclef Jean; Lenky; Andreas Litterscheid; T.C. Love; J. Marty; Steve Morales; NIV; Edwin Perez; Reinhard Raith; Red Spyda; Scott Storch; J. Stars

Lumidee chronology
Almost Famous (2003)	Unexpected (2007)

Singles from Unexpected
- 1. "She's Like the Wind" Released: April 3, 2007; 2. "Crazy" Released: May 22, 2007; 3. "Feel Like Makin' Love" Released: November 20, 2007

Unexpected is the second studio album by American singer Lumidee. It was released by TVT Records on April 17, 2007 in the United States and on June 21, 2007 in the United Kingdom. The album was produced primarily by J. Marty with additional contributions made by Scott Storch, T.C. Love, Lenky, Ron Browz, Wyclef Jean, Jerry Duplessis and Red Spyda.

== Background ==
In an interview with Vibe, Lumidee spoke about signing with TVT Records, stating: "TVT Records is the perfect way for me to come back and again I'm coming out of left field, just like with Never Leave You. Nobody ever thought of me coming back on a street credible label like TVT [...] Actually, nobody ever thought of me really even coming back, period." In another interview, Lumidee said of the album, "This time around I got to do an album. The first time around the world heard my demo, that’s basically what it was. I had a really big song which landed me the deal and they wanted an album in two weeks. [...] This time you’re getting to hear my progress through the years and the different emotions I’ve been going through."

== Content ==
The album was produced primarily by J. Marty, who produced eight out of the seventeen songs. Other contributors include Lenky, who produced "Crazy" featuring Miami rapper Pitbull and Jerry Duplessis, who produced the Kill Bill-inspired track, "The Whistle Song" which features former Fugees member, Wyclef Jean, who co-produced it. According to Lumidee, the idea to record a remake of Patrick Swayze's 1987 song "She's Like The Wind" was inspired by her European label when she recommended a collaboration with fellow New York recording artist Tony Sunshine. She described the album as having "many flavors", including "rap, R&B, Caribbean music, all the sounds that influence me." She also said, "Everything I'm doing is for the world. I’m not just trying to cater to one audience..." Another track, characterized as a "self-described in-your-face song" entitled, "He Told Me" is a reggae and hip-hop flavored song that "once again boasts Lumidee’s ability to effortlessly flow from rapping to singing, all under one title." Blues & Soul describes "Stuck On You" as an "emotionally-pleasing" song that is "backed with a beautiful Spanish guitar". A track titled "Did You Imagine" samples Manu Chao's "Me Gustas Tú" and is a reggaeton-flavored song that explores her Latin roots. Unexpected was named because, as she explained, "It's unexpected to some people that I'm still doing music."

== Singles ==
On April 3, 2007 "She's Like the Wind" was released as the first single from the album in the United States and Europe. It managed to peak at number forty-three on the U.S. Billboard Hot 100 and in Denmark, it reached the top ten. The second single, "Crazy" was released on May 22, 2007, in the United States and Europe but charted only on the European charts, including Germany, France, Belgium, Austria, and the United Kingdom. "Feel Like Makin' Love" was the third and final single from the album released in mid-November 2007. It performed less well than its predecessors, only landing on the Ultratip chart in Flanders.

== Critical reception ==
Professional ratings
Review scores
Source	Rating
AllMusic	3/5 stars
Associated Press	2.5/5 stars
Blues & Soul	8/10 stars
Entertainment Weekly	B

Andy Kellman of AllMusic rated the album three out of five stars and wrote: "There's much more nuance to her voice, whether she's singing or rapping. She's tougher, more womanly." He then ended on a mixed note, "As uneven and occasionally puzzling as a 17-track pop album gets, this is nonetheless a marked improvement over the debut." Entertainment Weekly gave the album a B rating and said that the album is "Nothing for the ages, but pleasantly of the moment".

Blues & Soul gave the album a positive review, commending the quality of the production and called it a "great deal more promise than her debut LP." Associated Press critic Melanie Sims critic felt that "unfortunately, guests Snoop Dogg, Shaggy and Jim Jones mostly outshine their host on Unexpected. While Lumidee sounds sweet on the lovey-dovey "Stuck on You," her singing voice comes off as strained most everywhere else. And while her flow is nothing to boast about, rapping seems to be the style she’s best at."

== Commercial performance ==
Following its release, Unexpected debuted at number forty-four on the US Billboard 200, with about 16,000 copies sold in its first week. On May 5, 2007 Unexpected debuted at number two on the US Billboard Independent Albums chart, remaining on the chart for five weeks.

== Track listing ==
Unexpected track listing
No.	Title	Writer(s)	Producer(s)	Length
1.	"Intro"	Lumidee Cedeño; Jesus Bobe; Steve Morales	J. Stars; Morales	0:45
2.	"So Cool... Hollywood"	Cedeño; John Vandersall	J. Stars; T.C. Love	3:59
3.	"In It for the Money" (featuring Snoop Dogg)	Cedeño; Calvin Broadus; Andy Thelusma	Red Spyda	3:27
4.	"Cute Boy"	Cedeño; Vandersall; Leonard Williams; Henry Lawes	J. Marty	3:43
5.	"She's Like the Wind" (featuring Tony Sunshine)	Patrick Swayze; Stacey Widelitz	J. Marty; T.C. Love	3:45
6.	"Feel Like Makin' Love" (featuring Shaggy)	Eugene McDaniels	J. Marty	3:45
7.	"Stuck On You"	Cedeño; Edwin Perez; Vandersall; Joseph Weiss	J. Marty; E. Perez	3:04
8.	"Caught Up"	Cedeño; Darrell Branch; Niv Davidovich	Branch; NIV	3:12
9.	"Crazy" (featuring Pitbull)	Cedeño; Armando Perez; Steven Marsden	Lenky	3:05
10.	"Could Be Anything"	Cedeño; Scott Storch	Storch	2:47
11.	"You Got Me" (featuring N.O.R.E.)	Cedeño; Victor Santiago; Rondell Turner	Ron Browz	2:58
12.	"The Whistle Song" (featuring Wyclef Jean)	Cedeño; Bernard Hermann; Wyclef Jean; Jerry Duplessis	Duplessis; Jean	3:44
13.	"I'm Up" (featuring Jim Jones)	Cedeño; Joseph Jones; Vandersall	J. Marty	3:19
14.	"He Told Me"	Cedeño; Vandersall; George Haye	J. Marty	3:09
15.	"Did You Imagine"	Cedeño; José-Manuel Chao; Vandersall; Weiss	J. Marty	3:49
16.	"Passin' Thru"	Cedeño; Vandersall	J. Marty	2:49
17.	"She's Like the Wind" (spanglish version)	Swayze; Widelitz	J. Marty; T.C. Love	4:13

European bonus track
No.	Title	Writer(s)	Producer(s)	Length
18.	"Dance!" (featuring Fatman Scoop)	George Merrill; Shannon Rubicam; Cedeño; Isaac Freeman; Cordell Burrell	Reinhard Raith; Andreas Litterscheid	2:41

Sample credits

- "Cute Boy" contains a portion of "Love and Unity Rhythm" as performed by Henry "Junjo" Lawes.
- "He Told Me" contains a portion of "Sunrise Til Sunset" as performed by The Wailing Souls.
- "Did You Imagine" samples "Me Gústas Tú" as performed by Manu Chao

== Personnel ==
- Wolfgang Boss: Executive Producer, A&R
- James Eichelberger: A&R
- Jonathan P. Fine: A&R
- Darrell Branch: Producer
- Eddie Perez: Producer
- J. Stars: Producer
- Jerry Duplessis: Producer
- NIV: Arranger, Producer
- Red Spyda: Producer
- Ron Browz: Producer
- Scott Storch: Producer
- Steve Morales: Producer
- Steven "Lenky" Marsden: Producer
- T.C. Love: Producer
- Wyclef Jean: Producer
- Lumidee: Vocals
- Stef Fink: Background Vocals
- Rob Raio: Background Vocals
- Courtney Harrell: Background Vocals
- Alonzo Vargas: Engineer, Mixing
- David Kutch: Mastering
- James Deering: Engineer
- Jarred Elioseff: Keyboards
- J. Mizzle: Keyboards
- Jesus Bobe: Engineer
- John Lardiari: Guitar
- Josh Modney: Violin
- Judy Hyman: Violin
- Julian Vasquez: Engineer
- Keith "Lil Wonda" Duplessis: Guitar
- Logic: Keyboards
- Max Buckholtz: Viola
- Mike DeSalvo: Mixing
- Mintman: Guitar
- Pablo O. Bilbraup: Percussion
- Rich Keller: Bass, Guitar, Mandolin, Mixing
- Samuel Jusino Jr.: Guitar, Engineer
- Sean Harkness: Guitar
- Sedeck Jean: Keyboards
- Stephen L. Joseph: Engineer
- Walter White: Horn, Horn Arrangements, String Arrangements
- Wilner Alexandre: Engineer
- Elliott Thomas: Piano
- Diego Morales: Engineer

== Charts ==
Weekly chart performance for Unexpected
Charts (2007)	Peak position
Belgian Albums (Ultratop Flanders)	65
US Billboard 200	44
US Independent Albums (Billboard)	2
US Top R&B/Hip-Hop Albums (Billboard)	14

== Release history ==
Release dates for Unexpected
Region	Date	Label(s)	Edition(s)	Ref.
United States	April 17, 2007	TVT	Standard edition	
France	April 17, 2007	TVT	Standard edition	
Japan	April 17, 2007	TVT	Standard edition	
Germany	April 20, 2007	TVT	Standard edition	
United Kingdom	June 21, 2007	TVT	Standard edition	
Canada	October 7, 2009	EMI Music Canada	Standard edition	
