= Sandunguero =

Studio album by DJ Blass
- Released: September 18, 2001
- Recorded: August 2001
- Studio: Fruity Studio
- Genre: Reggaeton
- Label: Pina Records
- Producers: DJ Blass, OG Black & Master Joe (exec. producer)

DJ Blass chronology
Triple Sexxx (2001)	Sandunguero (2001)	Sandunguero 2 (2002)

Sandunguero is a various artist album by DJ Blass released and distributed on behalf of Pina Records/Diamond Collections in the year 2001. After becoming one of the most sought after producers in Reggaeton, DJ Blass decided to create his own album featuring various known participants of the music genre. It topped the Billboard Tropical Albums chart.

== Track listing ==
All music is composed by DJ Blass.

No.	Title	Artist(s)	Length
1.	"Intro - Soy El Sandunguero"	DJ Blass	3:28
2.	"Metimos Las Patas"	Master Joe & OG Black	3:01
3.	"Sientelo"	Speedy	1:54
4.	"Interlude - Don Che Tra Mix"	DJ Blass	1:39
5.	"Un Nuevo Estilo"	Don Chezina	2:29
6.	"Por Mi Reggae Muero"	Wisin & Yandel	3:36
7.	"Maniatica Sexual"	Lito & Polaco	2:58
8.	"Sabanas Blancas"	Daddy Yankee & Nicky Jam	2:47
9.	"Quiero Estar Contigo"	Maicol & Manuel	2:58
10.	"Quiere Ser Like Me"	Rey Pirin	2:58
11.	"Interlude - Prende El"	DJ Blass	0:59
12.	"Encendio"	Falo	2:46
13.	"Tira Un Ritmo Sandunguero"	Great Kilo	1:57
14.	"Desnudate"	Yaga & Mackie	1:44
15.	"Baila El Mambo"	Notty Play	2:14
16.	"Bailen"	Jenay	2:31
17.	"Interlude - Recuerdos de Antes"	DJ Blass	1:23
18.	"Me Arrepiento"	Plan B	2:27
19.	"San Yo"	Baby J	1:44
20.	"Interlude - La Hora Del Yakeo"	DJ Blass	0:54
21.	Untitled	Outro DJ Blass
Total length:			47:51

In 2006 the album was rereleased globally by the imprint Reggaeton Nation who currently own the worldwide distribution rights to "Sandunguero" and have made it available on all digital streaming platforms.

== Charts ==
Chart (2001)	Peak position
US Top Latin Albums (Billboard)	10
US Tropical Albums (Billboard)	1
