= Wayne Wonder =

Jamaican reggae fusion singer

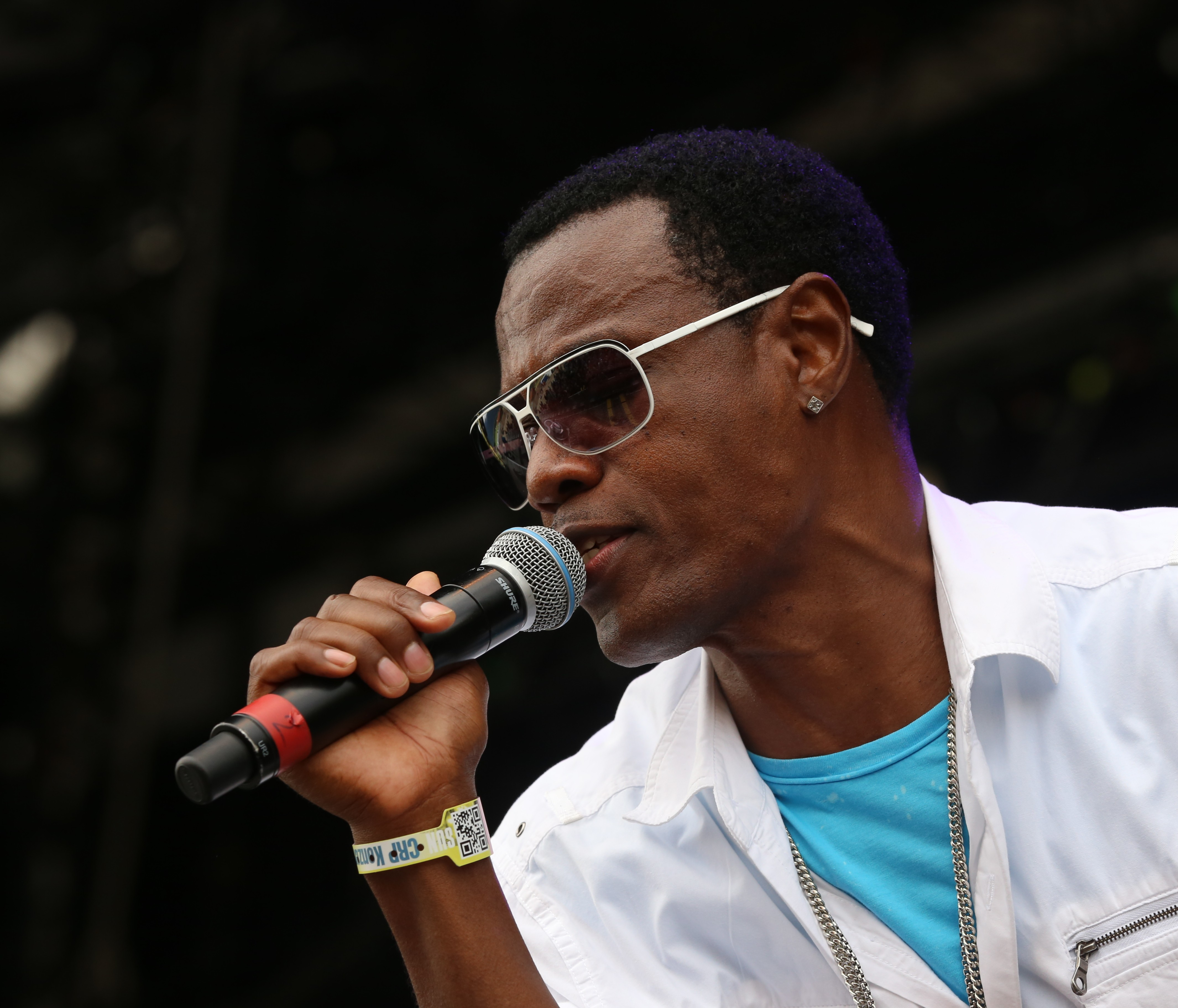
- Wonder performing in 2013

Background information
- Born: Von Wayne Charles; 26 July 1972 (age 54); Buff Bay, Portland, Jamaica
- Origin: Kingston, Jamaica
- Genres: Dancehall; reggae fusion; hip hop
- Occupations: Singer, songwriter
- Years active: 1985–present
- Label: VP Records
- Website: www.waynewondermusic.com

Von Wayne Charles (born 26 July 1972), better known by his stage name Wayne Wonder, is a Jamaican reggae and dancehall artist. His most popular single is the 2003 hit "No Letting Go".

== Biography ==
=== Early life ===
Wonder was born in Buff Bay, Portland, Jamaica. He sang in Sunday school as a child, Wayne attended Camperdown High School in eastern Kingston, and began songwriting at the age of 13, getting a major career break when he was given a regular weekly slot at Metro Media in Allman Town.

=== Auditioning and debut album ===
He auditioned at Sonic Sounds studio, but while Sly Dunbar was impressed, his touring commitments with Black Uhuru prevented him from signing Wonder. He had more success, however, with King Tubby, who produced his first single, "Long and Lasting Love", in 1985, with two more following. Wonder's career suffered a setback when Tubby was killed in 1989, and he recorded for several other record producers at Sonic Sound, enjoying a further hit with the Lloyd Dennis–produced "It's Over Now", leading to the release of his first album, One More Chance, although his success in this era was limited.

=== Second album: Part 2 and further releases ===
His fortunes improved when he began working with Dave Kelly, a friend from primary school, who had become resident sound engineer at Penthouse Studios. The partnership enjoyed a string of hits, starting with "Saddest Day", and they also worked on Wonder's second album, Part 2. His 1990 live performance of Alphaville's "Forever Young" was recorded and later released to Alphaville fans in a limited, cassette-only album entitled History. He toured the UK in 1992 along with other Penthouse stars Marcia Griffiths, Tony Rebel, and Buju Banton. He also recorded "Bonafide Love (Movie Star)" with Buju Banton, and wrote several early hits for him, including the controversial "Boom Bye Bye". He toured again with Banton in 1994 as part of the Penthouse Showcase. Wonder formed the band Alias along with Kelly, Baby Cham, Frisco Kid, and Frankie Sly, and later Entourage.

=== Record label launch and further album releases ===
In 2000, Wonder launched his own record label, Singso, and his 2000 album Da Vibe saw him begin to incorporate hip hop into his sound. He collaborated with several other major artists, including Jason Dalyrimple of Soul for Real, Foxy Brown, and Lisa "Left Eye" Lopes, and the move towards hip hop increased with his 2001 album Schizophrenic.

=== Atlantic Records signing and international recognition ===
His career really took off internationally when he signed to Atlantic Records, achieving worldwide success with the song "No Letting Go" in 2003. The song is based on the Diwali riddim, which was also used by several other artists that year, such as Sean Paul, Lumidee and Missy Elliott. The single reached No. 11 in the US and No. 3 in the UK.

"No Letting Go" and the album No Holding Back were a major success on urban radio stations in the US, and this prompted the release of several compilation albums featuring older Wonder material, including Trojan Records' Inna Bashment Style: The Roots Of An Urban Warrior (2005).

=== Further releases ===
His album Foreva was released in 2007. It reached No. 6 on the US Top Reggae Albums chart.

His album My Way was released in December 2012. In October 2014, he featured on the Never Mind the Buzzcocks identity parade.

== Discography ==
=== Albums ===
| Year | Album | US Reggae Albums | US Billboard 200 | US R&B/Hip-Hop |
|---|---|---|---|---|
| 1989 | One More Chance | – | – | – |
| 1991 | Wayne Wonder | – | – | – |
| 1993 | Don't Have To... | – | – | – |
| 1995 | All Original Boomshell | – | – | – |
| 2000 | Da Vibe | – | – | – |
| 2001 | Schizophrenic | – | – | – |
| 2003 | No Holding Back | 2 | 29 | 10 |
| 2007 | Foreva | 6 | – | – |
| 2012 | My Way | – | – | – |

=== Compilations albums ===
| Year | Album |
|---|---|
| 1989 | Wayne Wonder & Sanchez Part 1 |
| 1990 | Wayne Wonder & Sanchez Part 2 |
| 1999 | Collectors Series |
| 2002 | Essential |
| 2003 | You Me And She |
| 2005 | Inna Bashment Style: The Roots of an Urban Warrior |
| 2006 | Reggae Chronicles |
| 2013 | Penthouse Flashback Series: Wayne Wonder, Vol. 1 |
| 2013 | Penthouse Flashback Series: Wayne Wonder, Vol. 2 |
| 2020 | Reggae Penthouse Triplets: Beres Hammond, Sanchez and Wayne Wonder |

=== Singles ===
| Year | Single | Peak chart positions | | | | | | | | | | Certifications (sales thresholds) | Album |
| Year | Single | JAM Air. | BEL (FL) | CAN | FRA | GER | NLD | SWE | SWI | UK | US | Certifications (sales thresholds) | Album |
|---|---|---|---|---|---|---|---|---|---|---|---|---|---|
| 1989 | "You Send the Rain Away" (Pickout) | * | — | — | — | — | — | — | — | — | — | | One More Chance |
| 1997 | "Warm Jamaican Christmas" (with Baby Cham) | 2 | — | — | — | — | — | — | — | — | — | | Warm Jamaican Christmas |
| 2003 | "No Letting Go" | 3 | 21 | 26 | 37 | 31 | 3 | 23 | 24 | 3 | 11 | BPI: Platinum; RIAA: Gold | No Holding Back |
| 2003 | "Bounce Along" | * | 60 | — | — | — | 69 | — | 42 | 19 | — | | No Holding Back |
| 2004 | "Hold Me Now" (Thompson Twins) | * | — | — | — | — | — | — | — | — | — | | 50 First Dates: Love Songs from the Original Motion Picture |
| 2006 | "You" | * | — | — | — | — | — | — | — | — | — | | Single only |
| 2007 | "Gonna Love You" | * | — | — | — | — | — | — | — | — | — | | Foreva |
| 2007 | "Again" | * | — | — | — | — | — | — | — | — | — | | Foreva |
| 2007 | "For My Love" (featuring Trina) | * | — | — | — | — | — | — | — | — | — | | Foreva |
| 2012 | "Caught Up" | * | — | — | — | — | — | — | — | — | — | | My Way |
| 2014 | "Let Me Love You Tonight" | * | — | — | — | — | — | — | — | — | — | | Sweet Songs |
"—" denotes a recording that did not chart or was not released in that territory. "*" denotes that the chart did not exist at that time.
