= Steve Smooth =

- Also known as: Dirty Werk
- Born: Steven Stanula; Chicago, Illinois, U.S.
- Genres: EDM; house; electro house
- Occupations: Musician; record producer
- Instruments: Turntables; personal computer; CDJ
- Years active: 1999–present
- Labels: Ultra Music; Spinnin' Records; Ministry of Sound Australia; Black Hole Recordings
- Website: stevesmooth.com

Steve Smooth is an American EDM/house DJ, musician, record producer and remixer. He is known for having 15 + number one songs / remixes on the Billboard Dance Club Songs chart. He has done remixes for artists such as Janet Jackson, Ariana Grande, Martin Garrix, Kygo, Enrique Iglesias, Daddy Yankee, Diana Ross, Macklemore & Patrick Stump of Fall Out Boy. As an artist, his Dirty Werk singles with DJ Bam Bam titled "Stand Up" & their electro dance cover of "No Letting Go" both went #1 on the Billboard Dance Club Songs chart in 2018 & 2019. Steve has had releases on such labels as Ultra Records, Ministry of Sound, Black Hole Recordings, Flamingo Recordings & Spinnin Records. Steve is credited for having the first song ever sold on Beatport. Steve is also the official DJ for the Chicago Cubs and Chicago Blackhawks.

== Discography ==
=== Albums ===
- Late Nights (Menage Music)
- Alive (Menage Music / Black Hole Recordings)
- Higher (Ultra Records)
- Amp'd (with JJ Flores) (Ultra Records / Menage Music)
- The Collection (with JJ Flores) (Menage Music)

=== Singles and remixes ===
Elia Berthoud & Vassy - Without You (Dirty Werk Remix) - Add. Production and Remix

Debbie Gibson - Freedom - Wrote & Produced

Aaron Smith ft. Luvli - Dancin (Dirty Werk Remix) - Add. Production and Remix

Dirty Werk - Oh Yeah - Wrote & Produced

Dirty Werk - Stereo Life - Wrote & Produced

Jasmine Crow - Sky Is Falling (Dirty Werk Remix) - Add. Production and Remix

Kea - I Turn To You (Dirty Werk Remix) - Add. Production and Remix

Ximxia - Get Me On The Dance Floor (Dirty Werk Remix) - Add. Production and Remix

Martin Garrix & Dean Lewis - Used To Love (Dirty Werk Remix) - Add. Production and Remix

Ladi Rosato - Taylor Swift (Dirty Werk Remix) - Add. Production and Remix

The Perry Twins - Impluse (Dirty Werk Remix) - Add. Production and Remix

Debbie Gibson - Girls Night Out (Dirty Werk Remix) - Add. Production and Remix

Kesha - Raising Hell ft. Big Freedia (Dirty Werk Remix) - Add. Production and Remix

Brett O & Debby Holiday - Living for the Music (Dirty Werk Remix) - Add. Production and Remix

Hillary Roberts - Christmas With U (Dirty Werk Remix) - Add. Production and Remix

Ray Rhodes & Christian B featuring Meiko - In Another Life (Dirty Werk Remix) - Add. Production and Remix

Valerie Broussard & Galantis - Roots (Dirty Werk Remix) - Add. Production and Remix

Kalendr X Laura Bryna - Sweet Revenge (Dirty Werk Remix) - Add. Production and Remix

Kendra Erika - Break The Wheel (Dirty Werk Remix) - Add. Production and Remix

Mark Ronson ft. Camila Cabello - Find U Again (Dirty Werk Remix) - Add. Production and Remix

Heather Small - Movin On Up (Dirty Werk Remix) - Add. Production and Remix

P!nk ft. Cash Cash - Can We Pretend (Dirty Werk Remix) - Add. Production and Remix

Paula Cole - Hope Is Everywhere (Dirty Werk Remix) - Add. Production and Remix

Radmila - U R Moving Me (Dirty Werk Remix) - Add. Production and Remix

Hillary Roberts - Good Man (Dirty Werk Remix) - Add. Production and Remix Lovari Adam Barta Electropoint - No Day Like Today (Dirty Werk Remix) - Add. Production and Remix

Dirty Werk - No Letting Go - Wrote & Produced

Benny Mardones - Into The Night (Dirty Werk Remix) - Add. Production and Remix

Laverne Cox - Welcome Home (Dirty Werk Remix) - Add. Production and Remix

John Denver x Dirty Werk - Country Roads - Wrote & Produced

Ed Sheeran & Travis Scott - Antisocial (Steve Smooth Extended Remix) - Add. Production and Remix

Dave Matthias ft. Makeba - Madness And The Darkness (Dirty Werk Remix) - Add. Production and Remix

Temmora Featuring Karma - Fire (Dirty Werk Remix) - Add. Production and Remix

Martin Garrix - Summer Days (Dirty Werk Remix) - STMPD - Add. Production and Remix

Kendra Erika - A Deeper Love (Dirty Werk Remix) - Add. Production and Remix

Synes - Something’s Got To Give (Dirty Werk Remix) - Add. Production and Remix

P!nk - Walk Me Home (Dirty Werk Remix) - RCA - Add. Production and Remix

Going Home - DJ Kue (Dirty Werk Remix) - 418 Records - Add. Production and Remix

21 Savage - A&T (Steve Smooth Remix) - Add. Production and Remix

Kendra Erika - A Deeper Love (Dirty Werk Remix) - Add. Production and Remix

Omar Veluz - Send Me An Angel (Dirty Werk Remix) - Add. Production and Remix

Ariana Grande - Break Up With Your Girlfriend Im Bored (Dirty Werk Remix) - Rupublic Records - Add. Production and Remix

Rob Thomas - One Less Day (Dirty Werk Remix) - Atlantic Records - Add. Production and Remix

Ariana Grande - 7 Rings (Dirty Werk Remix) - Rupublic Records - Add. Production and Remix

Lil Pump - Be Like Me - (Steve Smooth Remix) - Add. Production and Remix

Diana Ross - The Boss 2109 (Dirty Werk Remix) - Motown Records - Add. Production and Remix

Velvet Code - Mary Offered Ladybugs And Love Yous (Dirty Werk Remix)

Mustard & Migos - Pure Water (Steve Smooth Remix) - Add. Production and Remix

Ray Guell - Don't Wanna Cry (Dirty Werk Remix) - Add. Production and Remix

C-Rod feat. Bredan O'Hara - Stay (Dirty Werk Remix) - Add. Production and Remix

Ariana Grande - thank u, next (Dirty Werk Remix) - Rupublic Records - Add. Production and Remix

Ariana Grande - Breathin (Dirty Werk Remix) - Rupublic Records - Add. Production and Remix

SEXTRONICA ft. Claudia Monet - Little Voices (Dirty Werk Remix)

Krys Monique - So Good (Dirty Werk Remix)

Kendra Erika - Self Control (Dirty Werk Remix)

Peyton Shayler - Want Me To Love You (Dirty Werk Remix)

Janet Jackson x Daddy Yankee - Made For Now (Dirty Werk Remix)

Jena Rose - Lost At Sea (Dirty Werk Remix)

Hilary Roberts - There For You (Dirty Werk Remix)

Caroline Lund - When U Tell Me (Dirty Werk Remix)

The Rua - All I Ever Wanted (Dirty Werk Remix)

Dirty Werk, Steve Smooth & Bam Bam - Stand Up

Kygo ft. Miguel - Remind Me To Forget (Dirty Werk Remix)

Sir Ivan - Get Together (Dirty Werk Remix)

JJ Thornhill - Take Me Back (Dirty Werk Remix)

Christine Gordon - Tidal Wave (Dirty Werk Remix)

Genesis Jones - With or Without You (Dirty Werk Remix)

Sophie Simmons - Black Mirror (Dirty Werk Remix) - Add. Production and Remix

Jena Rose - Reasons (Dirty Werk Remix) - Add. Production and Remix

Orion Starchild - Like My Status (Dirty Werk Remix) - Add. Production and Remix

Enrique Iglesias ft. Bad Bunny - El Baño (Dirty Werk Remix) - Sony - Add. Production and Remix

Perry Twins ft. Harper Starling - Euphoria (Dirty Werk Remix) - Add. Production and Remix

OBB - Mona Lisa (Dirty Werk Remix) - Curb Records - Add. Production and Remix

Dave Aude ft. King Brown - Perfect To Me (Dirty Werk Remix) - Audacious - Add. Production and Remix

Azure - Too Late (Dirty Werk Remix) - 2220 - Add. Production and Remix

LeAnn Rimes - Love Line (Dirty Werk Remix) - Sony Music - Add. Production and Remix

Richard Orlinski & Nyanda - On My Way (Dirty Werk Remix) - Play Two - Add. Production and Remix

AXSHN - Location - Atlantic - Wrote & Produced

Scotty Boy & Lizzie Curious - Shine Your Love (Dirty Werk Remix) - 418 - Add. Production and Remix

El General - Tu Pum Pum (Steve Smooth Remix) - Add. Production and Remix

Ricky Rebel - If You Were My Baby (Dirty Werk Remix) Audio4Play - Add. Production and Remix

Avicii feat. Rita Ora - Lonely Together (Dirty Werk Remix) - Add. Production and Remix

Yo Gotti & Mike WiLL Made-It - Rake It Up ft. Nicki Minaj (Steve Smooth & Tony Arzadon Remix) - Add. Production and Remix

AXSHN - Tell Me (Dirty Werk Remix) - Atlantic - Add. Production and Remix

AXSHN - Tell Me - Atlantic - Wrote & Produced

Kendra Erika - Under My Skin (Dirty Werk Remix) - Dauman Music - Add. Production and Remix

Brooke Candy - Living Out Loud feat. Sia (Dirty Werk Remix) - RCA - Add. Production and Remix

Kyle - iSpy (Steve Smooth & Tony Arzadon Remix) - Atlantic - Add. Production and Remix

Steve Smooth & Bam Bam - Spread Love - Fly House Records - Wrote & Produced

Lodato, Joseph Duveen & Jaclyn Walker - Breathe Again (Steve Smooth & Tony Arzadon Remix) - Add. Production and Remix

Nervo - In Your Arms (Kalendr & Steve Smooth Remix) - Big Beat - Add. Production and Remix

Kygo & Selena Gomez - It Ain't Me (Steve Smooth Remix) - Ultra Records - Add. Production and Remix

Steve Smooth & Tony Arzadon - Turn Up The Bass - Menage Music - Wrote & Produced

Bebe Rexha - I Got You (Dirty Werk Remix) - Warner Bros - Add. Production and Remix

Ed Sheeran - Shape Of You (Tony Arzadon & Steve Smooth Remix) - Atlantic - Add. Production and Remix

Kendra Erika - Oasis (Dirty Werk Remix) - Dauman Music - Add. Production and Remix

Steve Smooth - Here We Go - Menage Music - Wrote & Produced

Steve Smooth - Gotta Love - Menage Music - Wrote & Produced

Skrillex & Rick Ross - Purple Lamborghini (Tony Arzadon & Steve Smooth Remix) - Atlantic - Add. Production and Remix

Tony Arzadon & Steve Smooth - Bang! - Menage Music - Wrote & Produced

Twenty One Pilots - Ride (Steve Smooth & Tony Arzadon Remix) - Fueled By Ramen - Add. Production and Remix

Steve Smooth & Tony Arzadon - Oh! Bring It Baby - Menage Music - Wrote & Produced

Steve Smooth - Body 2 Body - Menage Music - Wrote & Produced

Steve Smooth - No Good - Menage Music - Wrote & Produced

Steve Smooth feat. Jenny G - Lose Control - Menage Music – Wrote & Produced

Steve Smooth - Bring That Beat Back - Menage Music – Wrote & Produced

Steve Smooth - Pump Up The Volume - Menage Music – Wrote & Produced

Bad Boy Bill & Steve Smooth feat. Seann Bowe - Feel Alive – Menage Music – Wrote & Produced

John Newman - Love Me Again (Bad Boy Bill & Steve Smooth Remix) - Island – Add. Production and Remix

Bad Boy Bill & Steve Smooth - Get On The Floor - Menage Music – Wrote & Produced

Bad Boy Bill & Steve Smooth - Mmm Drop - Menage Music – Wrote & Produced

George Acosta & Ben Hague - Time Stood Still (Steve Smooth, Sephano & Torio Remix) - Black Hole Recordings – Add. Production and Remix

Bad Boy Bill & Steve Smooth feat. Seann Bowe - Free - Menage Music – Wrote & Produced

Scotty Boy & DJ Red feat. Ajay Popoff - Know Your Name Tonight (Steve Smooth, Sephano & Torio Remix) - Flamingo Recordings – Add. Production and Remix

Dragon & Jontron feat. Lea Luna - Tonight (Steve Smooth & Tony Arzadon Remix) - Black Hole Recordings – Add. Production and Remix

Steve Smooth, Sephano & Torio feat. Little Lisa - All Your Love - Menage Music – Wrote & Produced

Steve Smooth & JJ Flores feat. Colette - Stay (Sephano & Torio 2013 Remix) - Ultra Records / Menage Music – Wrote & Produced

Steve Smooth, Sephano & Torio feat. Jenny G - This Is The Night - Black Hole Recordings – Wrote & Produced

Steve Smooth & Tony Arzadon feat. Tamra Keenan - All You and I - Black Hole Recordings – Wrote & Produced

Steve Smooth, Joey C & Dj Torio feat. Drew Delneky - Be Without You - Ultra Records – Wrote & Produced

Steve Smooth with Tamra Keenan - Stalker - Ultra Records – Wrote & Produced

Steve Smooth, Kalendr & Jonas Tempel - The Maya - Ultra Records – Wrote & Produced

Steve Smooth & Kalendr - Dancin with the Dead - Ultra Records – Wrote & Produced

Steve Smooth feat. Tamra Keenan - You Take Me Here - Ultra Records / Menage Music – Wrote & Produced

Steve Smooth feat. Krystal Malik - I’m Not Sorry - Ultra Records / Menage Music – Wrote & Produced

Aaron Smith feat. Luvli - Dancin 2011 - Menage Music – Add. Production and Remix

Steve Smooth - Party People - Ultra Records / Menage Music – Wrote & Produced

Bad Boy Bill feat. Eric Jag - Got That Feeling - Nettwerk – Add. Production and Remix

Steve Smooth feat. Delano - Just Come With Me - Ultra Records / Menage Music – Wrote & Produced

Steve Smooth feat. Alex Peace - Make Some Noise - Ultra Records / Menage Music – Wrote & Produced

Steve Smooth feat. Luvli - So High - Ultra Records / Menage Music – Wrote & Produced

Bad Boy Bill feat. Alyssa Palmer - Do What U Like - Nettwerk – Co-Wrote & Co-Produced

Bad Boy Bill feat. Alyssa Palmer - Falling Anthem - Nettwerk – Co-Wrote & Co-Produced

JJ Flores & Steve Smooth feat. Alex Peace - Sex Fiend - Ultra Records / Menage Music – Wrote & Produced

JJ Flores & Steve Smooth feat. Colette - Stay - Ultra Records / Menage Music – Wrote & Produced

Ask (JJ Flores & Steve Smooth vs JES Mix) - Ultra Records – Wrote & Produced

JJ Flores & Steve Smooth feat. Alex Peace - I’m The 1 U C! - Ultra Records – Wrote & Produced

JJ Flores & Steve Smooth feat. B. Lee - Make It Up 2 U - Ultra Records – Wrote & Produced

JJ Flores & Steve Smooth feat. Alex Peace - Music Maker - Ultra Records – Wrote & Produced

JJ Flores & Steve Smooth feat. Little Lisa - Take Me - Ultra Records – Wrote & Produced

JJ Flores & Steve Smooth feat. Delano - Walking Away - Ultra Records – Wrote & Produced

JJ Flores & Steve Smooth and DJ Roland Clark - Peace & Happiness - Ultra Records / Menage Music – Wrote & Produced

JJ Flores & Steve Smooth Feat. B. Lee - Let It Go - Ultra Records / Menage Music – Wrote & Produced

The Young Punx - You’ve Got To... - Ultra Records – Add. Production and Remix

Nick Terranova - Come Alive - Ultra Records – Add. Production and Remix

JJ Flores & Steve Smooth Feat. Luvli - Being In Love - Ultra Records / Menage Music – Wrote & Produced

Santana Feat. Chad Kroeger - Into The Night - Arista – Add. Production and Remix

Shock Stars - Feel For A Heartbeat [EP] - Shock Stars Music – Wrote & Produced

Shock Stars - Shock Stars [EP] - Shock Stars Music – Wrote & Produced

Shock Stars - End Of Chicago – Menage Music – Wrote & Produced

Nelly Furtado - Say It Right - Geffen – Add. Production and Remix

JJ Flores & Steve Smooth - Deep Inside These Walls - Menage Music – Wrote & Produced

Starkillers Present Nick Terranova - Scream - Spinnin – Add. Production and Remix

Hatiras & DJ Dan - Love For The Weekend - Blow Media – Add. Production and Remix

JJ Flores & Steve Smooth Feat. Delano - Let Me Live - Menage Music – Wrote & Produced

Tom Novy - Your Body - Data – Add. Production and Remix

Mr. Groove - I Don’t Know - 24Seven – Add. Production and Remix

JJ Flores & Steve Smooth - Time For Love - Menage Music – Wrote & Produced

JJ Flores Feat. Delano - Feels So Good - Menage Music – Add. Production and Remix

JJ Flores & Steve Smooth - The Ride - Fine Tune Records – Wrote & Produced

Aaron Smith feat. Luvli - Dancin - Spinnin’ Records – Add. Production and Remix

JJ Flores & Steve Smooth - Freak You - International House Records – Wrote & Produced

Smooth & J feat. Alex Peace - B Like Me - Motus Music – Wrote & Produced

Dukes Of Sluca - Don’t Stop - Fine-Tune Records – Add. Production and Remix

Norty Cotto - I’ll Be Your Freak - Definitive – Add. Production and Remix

Patrick Alavi - 1992 - International House Records – Add. Production and Remix

David Garcia - Take U There - International House Records – Add. Production and Remix

Bad Boy Bill - Freq’d - International House Records – Add. Production

JJ Flores & Steve Smooth feat. Alex Peace - Discoteca - Moody Recordings – Wrote & Produced

Harrison Crump - The Talk 2 - Hump Records – Add. Production and Remix

Smooth & J - Get Naked - Motus Music – Wrote & Produced

J Flores & Steve Smooth feat. Delano - Release - International House Records – Wrote & Produced

Bad Boy Bill - Happy - Moody Recordings – Add. Production and Remix

Steve Smooth - Beat Freaker - International House Records – Wrote & Produced

Steve Smooth - Drop It - International House Records – Wrote & Produced

Bad Boy Bill - Costa Del Sol - Moody Recordings – Add. Production and Remix

Bad Boy Bill - Everybody - International House Records – Add. Production

Bad Boy Bill - Re-Conditioned - International House Records – Add. Production

Dajae - Everyday Of My Life - Kid Dynamite Records – Add. Production and Remix

Automatic - Gimme Your Love - International House Records – Add. Production and Remix

Dajae - Time - Kid Dynamite Records – Add. Production and Remix

=== Continuous DJ Mixes ===
MADE In CHICAGO – JJ Flores & Steve Smooth - Ultra Records – Produced & Mixed

Behind The Decks Live – Bad Boy Bill - Thrive – Add. Production and Assistance

Behind The Decks – Bad Boy Bill - System Recordings – Add. Production and Assistance

Bangin The Box 5 – Bad Boy Bill - Mix Connection – Add. Production and Assistance

Bangin In London – Bad Boy Bill - Master Dance Tones – Add. Production and Assistance

Discographies

- Steve Smooth at AllMusic
- Steve Smooth at Discogs

== See also ==
- Ultra Records

== Notes ==
"Release" JJ Flores & Steve Smooth feat. Delano was the 1st song ever sold on Beatport.com.

== Awards and nominations ==
Selected awards for Steve Smooth
Year	Award	Nominated work	Category	Result
2017	Remix Awards	Steve Smooth	Best Rise & Drop!	Won
2018	Remix Awards	Steve Smooth	Best Remix Collaboration	Won
