= Natasja =

Natasja is a given name, and may refer to:

- Natasja Andreasen (born 2000), Danish handball player
- Natasja Crone Back, Danish journalist
- Natasja Saad (1974–2007), Danish rapper, deejay, and singer
- Natasja Panina, birth name of Ukrainian ballroom dancer Natalya Panina
- Natasja Shah (born 1972), Trinidad poet
- Natasja Vermeer (born 1973), Dutch actress and model
- Natasja Oerlemans (born 1969), Dutch politician
- Natasja Bech, Danish recurve archer
- Natasha Clausen (born 1992), Danish handball player
- Natasja Anthonisen, Danish badminton player
- Natasja Smith, Miss Grand Denmark 2013 and finalist of Denmark Next Topmodel (season 2)
- Natasja Loutchko, Swedish post-war and contemporary artist
- Natasha van Lang, Child and adolescent psychiatrist and researcher
- Natasja Kunde, Miss Grand Denmark 2022

== See also ==
- Natasha
- Natacha
