= Don't Sweat That (Whistle Song) =

Single by Dr. Stay Dry featuring Lumidee

from the album Don't Sweat That (Whistle Song) Single
- Released: 2008
- Genre: Hip hop
- Length: 3:28
- Label: Sony Music
- Songwriters: Pierce Cardin, Lumidee Cedeño, Bernard Hermann, Wyclef Jean, Jerry Duplessis, Andrew Wyatt
- Producers: Jerry Duplessis, Wyclef Jean

Lumidee singles chronology
"Feel Like Makin' Love" (2007)	"Don't Sweat That (Whistle Song)" (2008)	"Let Go" (2008)

Don't Sweat That (Whistle Song) is a single released by Dr. Stay Dry. It features American R&B singer and rapper Lumidee and samples music from the movie Twisted Nerve. It is a remix of The Whistle Song from Lumidee's second album Unexpected.

== Track listing ==
Scandinavian Maxi-Single

No.	Title	Length
1.	"Don't Sweat That" (Radio Mix)	3:32
2.	"Don't Sweat That" (Club Mix)	4:33
3.	"Don't Sweat That" (Instrumental)	3:28
4.	"Don't Sweat That" (Jean Elan's Miami Treatment)	6:04
5.	"Don't Sweat That" (Voodoo & Serano Summermix)	5:30
6.	"Let's Stay Dry"	2:38

== Charts ==
Chart (2008)	Peak position
Austria (Ö3 Austria Top 75)	45
