= Crazy (Lumidee song) =

Single by Lumidee featuring Pitbull

from the album Unexpected
- B-side: "He Told Me"
- Released: July 24, 2007
- Genre: Dancehall; hip hop
- Label: TVT
- Songwriters: Lumidee Cedeño; Steven Marsden; Armando Perez
- Producer: Lenky

Lumidee singles chronology
"She's Like the Wind" (2007)	"Crazy" (2007)	"Feel Like Makin' Love" (2007)

Pitbull singles chronology
"Sticky Icky" (2007)	"Crazy" (2007)	"Secret Admirer" (2007)

"Crazy" is a song recorded by American recording artists Lumidee and Pitbull for Lumidee's second album, Unexpected (2007). It was written by Lumidee, Pitbull and Steven "Lenky" Marsden and produced by the latter. It was released as the second single on July 24, 2007 by TVT Records.

== Music video ==
The music video for this song was directed by Dale Resteghini.

== Track listing ==
Germany Crazy - EP

1. "Crazy" – 3:04
2. "Crazy" (Club Mix) – 3:56
3. "Crazy" (Instrumental) – 3:04
4. "He Told Me" – 3:09

== Charts ==
=== Weekly charts ===
Chart (2007)	Peak position
Austria (Ö3 Austria Top 40)	65
Belgium (Ultratop 50 Flanders)	35
Belgium (Ultratop 50 Wallonia)	40
France (SNEP)	53
Germany (GfK)	35
Scottish Singles Sales (Official Charts)	52
UK Singles (Official Charts)	74
UK Hip Hop/R&B (Official Charts)	7

== Release history ==
Region	Date	Format	Label
United Kingdom	July 30, 2007	CD single	TVT Records
