= Crashin' a Party =

Single by Lumidee featuring N.O.R.E.

from the album Almost Famous
- B-side: "Only For Your Good"
- Released: December 23, 2003
- Genre: R&B; hip hop
- Length: 3:13
- Label: Universal
- Songwriters: Lumidee Cedeño; Teddy Mendez; Edwin Perez; Victor Santiago
- Producers: DJ Tedsmooth; Trendsetta

Lumidee singles chronology
"Never Leave You" (2003)	"Crashin' a Party" (2003)	"Die Besten Tage Sind Gezählt" (2004)

N.O.R.E. singles chronology
"Feelin' You" (2002)	"Crashin' a Party" (2003)	"Oye Mi Canto" (2004)

Crashin' A Party is the second single by American R&B singer and rapper Lumidee, from her debut album Almost Famous (2003).

== Track listing ==
European CD single

No.	Title	Length
1.	"Crashin' A Party"	3:13
2.	"Crashin' A Party" (Video Edit with Rap)	3:19

German 12" vinyl

No.	Title	Length
1.	"Crashin' A Party" (featuring Kool Savas)
2.	"One For Lumi" (featuring Kool Savas)
3.	"Something Like" (featuring Kool Savas)
4.	"Only For Your Good"
5.	"Crashin' A Party (Afreex Remix)" (featuring Thunda Storm)
6.	"Never Leave You (Uh Oooh – Bugati Remix)"

== Charts ==
=== Weekly charts ===
Chart (2003–2004)	Peak position
Austria (Ö3 Austria Top 40)	43
Belgium (Ultratop 50 Flanders)	31
Belgium (Ultratip Bubbling Under Wallonia)	7
Germany (GfK)	23
Hungary (Dance Top 40)	19
Scotland Singles (OCC)	77
Switzerland (Schweizer Hitparade)	44
UK Singles (OCC)	55
UK Hip Hop/R&B (OCC)	14
