= No Holding Back =

Studio album by Wayne Wonder
- Released: March 4, 2003
- Recorded: 2001–2002
- Genre: R&B; dancehall
- Label: VP
- Producer: Steven Marsden, Joel Chin, Von Wayne Charles, Donovan "Vendetta" Bennett, Collin "Bulbie" York, Lynford "Fatta" Marshall, Tony "CD" Kelly, Craig "Leftside" Parks, Matthew "Esco" Thompson, O. McNaught & O. Rennalls, Troyton Rami & Roger Mackenzie, Dwayne "Deenucka" Johnson, Donovan Germain

Wayne Wonder chronology
Schizophrenic (2001)	No Holding Back (2003)	Foreva (2007)

No Holding Back is the eleventh studio album by Jamaican reggae fusion singer Wayne Wonder. It was released on March 4, 2003 via VP Records; and it remains Wonder’s only album to date to have charted on the Billboard 200, peaking at #29. The title of the album comes from the chorus of the single "No Letting Go", which helped make it Wonder's most successful album.

== Critical reception ==
Professional ratings
Review scores
Source	Rating
AllMusic	4/5 stars
Blender	2/5 stars

In a positive review, Vibe magazine's Rob Kenner gave No Holding Back a four-out-of-five disc rating and called it "the right record at the right time" because of its mixture of innovative dancehall and decent R&B-pop songs. William Ruhlmann of AllMusic gave it four out of five stars and said that the reggae-inflected R&B album is generally in the same vein as "No Letting Go", which shows that "the only thing on Wonder's mind is love, and if he has nothing new to say about it, he nevertheless keeps things moving along nicely." In his consumer guide for The Village Voice, Robert Christgau was less enthusiastic and graded the album as a "dud", indicating "a bad record whose details rarely merit further thought."

== Track listing ==
Track listing
Title	Songwriter(s)	Performers	Samples
"Intro"	V. W. Charles	Wayne Wonder
"No Letting Go"	V. W. Charles; S. Marsden	Wayne Wonder	Diwali Riddim by Steven "Lenky" Marsden
"Bounce Along"	V. W. Charles; S. Marsden; P. Edmund	Wayne Wonder; Dwayne "Deenucka" Johnson (chorus)
"Friend Like Me"	V. W. Charles; P. Edmund	Wanye Wonder
"Nobody But Me"	V. W. Charles; P. Edmund	Wayne Wonder
"Glad You Came My Way"	V. W. Charles; S. Marsden	Wayne Wonder
"Crazy Feeling"	V. W. Charles; D. Bennett; O. Brian	Wayne Wonder (chorus and bridge); Elephant Man (1st and 2nd verse)
"Definitely"	V. W. Charles; P. Yubah; C. York	Wayne Wonder
"Just Another Day"	V. W. Charles; A. Kelly; S. Marsden	Wayne Wonder
"Close Your Eyes"	V. W. Charles; D. Bennett; Daseka	Wayne Wonder
"My Kinda Lady"	V. W. Charles; M. Gregory; A. Kelly	Wayne Wonder
"The Mood Is Right"	V. W. Charles; C. Parks	Wayne Wonder
"Slowly But Surely"	V. W. Charles; O. Renalls	Wayne Wonder
"Perfect Proposal"	V. W. Charles; A. Kelly; S. Marsden	Wayne Wonder
"Enemies"	V. W. Charles; D. Thompson; T. Rami	Wayne Wonder; Supriz (chorus)
"Metal And Steel"	V. W. Charles; D. Johnson	Wayne Wonder; Demo Delgado; Showki Ru
"Saddest Day"	V. W. Charles; C. Browne; W. Johnson	Wayne Wonder

== Personnel ==
Contributors
Producers
Producers	Steven Marsden, Joel Chin, Von Wayne Charles, Donovan "Vendetta" Bennett, Collin "Bulby" York, Lynford "Fatta" Marshall, Tony "CD" Kelly, Craig "Lef Side" Parks, Mathew "Esco" Thompson, O. McNaught & O. Rennalls, Troyton Rami & Roger Mackenzie, Dwayne "Deenucka" Johnson, Donovan Germain
Executive Producers	Christopher Chin, Joel Chin
Performers
Lead vocals and rapping	Wayne Wonder, Elephant Man, Supriz, Demo Delgado, Showki Ru
Background vocals	Dwayne "Deenucka" Johnson
Guitar	Dalton Browne
Percussion	Paul "Teetimus" Edmund (drums)
Synthesizer	Steven "Lenky" Marsden (keyboard)
Technicians
Engineers	Joel Chin, Fitzroy "Wizard" Blake, Tony Kelly, Michael MacDonald, A. "Rookie" Tyrell, Collin "Bulbie" York
Assistant Engineers	Backra, Dwayne "Deenucka" Johnson, Michael MacDonald, Richard "12" Brown, Denise "Bandit" Shields, Kevin Evil, Baddable
Mastering	Joel Chin, Chris Scott
Mixing	Joel Chin, Tony Kelly, Michael MacDonald, Troyton Rami, Claude "Weakhand" Reynolds, A. "Rookie" Tyrell, Collin "Bulbie" York
Mixing Assistant	Claude "Weakhand" Reynolds
Art Direction, Design	Kiku Yamaguchi
Photography	William Richards

== Charts ==
=== Weekly charts ===
Chart (2003)	Peak position
US Billboard 200	29
US Top R&B/Hip-Hop Albums (Billboard)	10
US Reggae Albums (Billboard)	2

=== Year-end charts ===
Chart (2003)	Position
US Top R&B/Hip-Hop Albums (Billboard)	94
