= Stacy Widelitz =

American composer, songwriter, photographer, and civic leader

- Born: March 28, 1956; Plainview, New York, U.S.
- Died: June 17, 2025 (aged 69)
- Occupations: Composer, songwriter, photographer
- Years active: 1970s–2025
- Known for: Co-writing "She's Like the Wind"

Stacy Widelitz (March 28, 1956 – June 17, 2025) was an American composer, songwriter, and photographer. He co-wrote the song "She's Like the Wind" with Patrick Swayze for the Dirty Dancing soundtrack. The single peaked at No. 3 on the Billboard Hot 100 and reached No. 1 on Billboard’s Adult Contemporary chart in 1988. Based in Los Angeles and later Nashville, he composed for feature films and television, including ABC’s World of Discovery, for which he received an Emmy nomination, and wrote the end-title song "Between Two Worlds" for Pocahontas II: Journey to a New World.

== Early life ==
Widelitz was born in Plainview, New York, on March 28, 1956, and began performing as a pianist while still a teenager. By age 15 he was playing clubs on Long Island, joined the American Federation of Musicians Local 802, and started composing professionally at 19.

== Career ==
=== Television and film ===
At age 24, Widelitz landed his first national TV theme for The Richard Simmons Show, which led to further television work after a move to Los Angeles. He later collaborated with Patrick Swayze on "She's Like the Wind" for Dirty Dancing. The single reached No. 3 on the Billboard Hot 100 and topped Adult Contemporary in 1988.

Widelitz composed for feature films and more than twenty made-for-TV movies, and received an Emmy nomination for music on ABC’s World of Discovery. He also co-wrote the end-title song "Between Two Worlds" for Disney’s Pocahontas II: Journey to a New World, performed by Judy Kuhn and Billy Zane.

=== Work in Nashville ===
After relocating to Nashville in 2000, Widelitz continued composing and expanded his civic involvement. He served on boards including the Nashville Opera, Nashville Film Festival, ALIAS Chamber Ensemble, and Dismas House. He was President of the board at several organizations and served as President of the Leadership Music board in 2017–2018. He served as a City Commissioner in Oak Hill, Tennessee, from 2016 to 2020.

== Photography ==
In later years, Widelitz developed a parallel career as a black-and-white street photographer. His work was exhibited in Nashville at Chauvet Arts and other venues, and he received multiple awards and publications.

== Awards and honors ==
- Billboard Hot 100 No. 3 and Adult Contemporary No. 1 for "She's Like the Wind" (1988).
- Emmy nomination for music on ABC’s World of Discovery.
- Best Music Award, Nashville Film Festival, for One Last Dance (2004).
- Posthumous honor: creation of the annual “Widelitz Music In Film Award” at the Nashville Film Festival (2025).

== Death ==
Widelitz died on June 17, 2025, at the age of 69 following a recent diagnosis of pancreatic cancer that had metastasized.

== Selected works ==
=== Songs ===
- "She's Like the Wind" (co-writer; recorded by Patrick Swayze featuring Wendy Fraser; from Dirty Dancing).
- "Between Two Worlds" (co-writer; end-title song, Pocahontas II: Journey to a New World).

=== Film and television (selected) ===
- World of Discovery (ABC) — composer; Emmy nomination.
- One Last Dance — score and dance music; Nashville Film Festival Best Music Award, 2004.
- Cro (ABC/Children’s Television Workshop)

== Civic and professional leadership ==
Widelitz served as President of Leadership Music in 2017–2018, following earlier officer roles. He was a longtime board member of Nashville Opera, ALIAS Chamber Ensemble, and the Nashville Film Festival, where he later became board president. He also served as a City Commissioner for Oak Hill from 2016 to 2020.
