= She's Like the Wind =

1987 single by Patrick Swayze featuring Wendy Fraser

Single by Patrick Swayze featuring Wendy Fraser

from the album Dirty Dancing: Original Soundtrack from the Vestron Motion Picture
- B-side: "Stay" (performed by Maurice Williams and the Zodiacs)
- Released: December 1987
- Recorded: November 1986
- Genre: Soft rock
- Length: 3:56
- Label: RCA
- Songwriters: Patrick Swayze; Stacy Widelitz
- Producer: Michael Lloyd

Patrick Swayze featuring Wendy Fraser singles chronology
"She's Like the Wind" (1987)	"Raising Heaven (in Hell) Tonight" (1989)

"She's Like the Wind" is a 1987 song by American actor and singer Patrick Swayze from the soundtrack to the film Dirty Dancing. The song features additional vocals from singer Wendy Fraser.

== Background ==
Swayze and Stacy Widelitz co-wrote the song in 1984. During production of Dirty Dancing in 1987, Swayze played the demo for producer Linda Gottlieb and director Emile Ardolino. They loved it and passed it on to Jimmy Ienner and Bob Feiden, the soundtrack's executive producers. It was recorded for the soundtrack in November 1986, with Michael Lloyd producing.

During his appearance on the August 7, 2020, episode of the podcast The Joe Rogan Experience, actor Rob Lowe mentioned that Swayze tried to shop the song to the producers of Lowe's 1986 film, Youngblood, for inclusion on its soundtrack but the song was rejected.

== Chart performance ==
In the US, the song went to No. 1 on the Billboard Adult Contemporary chart, No. 3 on the Billboard Hot 100 and No. 2 on Cashbox Top 100. Worldwide, it became a top-10 hit in nine other countries.

== Music video ==
The music video was directed by David Fincher and depicts Swayze singing the song (joined in the climax by Fraser) and clips from the film in black and white. The video can be seen on the Ultimate Dirty Dancing DVD and other home media releases of the movie.

== Releases ==
The song was released commercially on 7" vinyl in many countries, with a 3-track 12" maxi single and 2-track cassette also produced. CD singles were a relatively new format. A 2- and 3-track 5" CD and Japanese mini CD single were commercially released.

=== Track listings ===
7-inch vinyl single – US
No.	Title	Writer(s)	Length
1.	"She's Like the Wind"	P. Swayze, S. Widelitz	3:49
2.	"Stay"	Maurice Williams	1:34

CD single – France
No.	Title	Writer(s)	Length
1.	"She's Like the Wind"	P. Swayze, S. Widelitz	3:49
2.	"Stay"	Maurice Williams	1:34

Cassette single – US
No.	Title	Writer(s)	Length
1.	"She's Like the Wind"	P. Swayze, S. Widelitz	3:49
2.	"Stay"	Maurice Williams	1:34

== Personnel ==
- Patrick Swayze – lead vocals
- Wendy Fraser – harmony and co-lead vocals
- Laurence Juber – guitar
- Gary Herbig – saxophone
- Dennis Belfield – bass
- Paul Leim – drums
- Stacy Widelitz – Oberheim OB-8 synthesizer

== Charts ==
=== Weekly charts ===
Chart (1988–1992)	Peak position
Australia (Kent Music Report)	6
Austria (Ö3 Austria Top 40)	15
Belgium (Ultratop 50 Flanders)	5
Canada (The Record)	5
Canada Top Singles (RPM)	4
Canada Adult Contemporary (RPM)	1
France (SNEP)	7
Ireland (IRMA)	4
Italy Airplay (Music & Media)	5
Mexico (La Opinión)	7
Netherlands (Dutch Top 40)	10
Netherlands (Single Top 100)	13
New Zealand (Recorded Music NZ)	27
Norway (VG-lista)	7
Puerto Rico (La Opinión)	8
South Africa (Springbok Radio)	13
Sweden (Sverigetopplistan)	8
Switzerland (Schweizer Hitparade)	23
UK Singles (Official Charts)	17
US Billboard Hot 100	3
US Adult Contemporary	1
US Cash Box Top 100	2

Chart (2022)	Peak position
UK Singles Downloads (Official Charts)	87

=== Year-end charts ===
Chart (1988)	Position
Belgium (Ultratop)	45
Canada Top Singles (RPM)	29
US Billboard Hot 100	40
US Billboard Adult Contemporary	14
US Cash Box Top 100	38

== Certifications ==
Region	Certification	Certified units/sales
Denmark (IFPI Danmark)	Gold	45,000^{‡}
United Kingdom (BPI)	Platinum	600,000^{‡}
^{‡} Sales+streaming figures based on certification alone.

== Lumidee and Tony Sunshine version ==
"She's Like the Wind"

Single by Lumidee featuring Tony Sunshine

from the album Unexpected
- Released: January 13, 2007
- Label: TVT
- Producers: J. Marty, T.C. Love

Lumidee singles chronology
"Dance!" (2006)	"She's Like the Wind" (2007)	"Crazy" (2007)

American recording artists Lumidee and Tony Sunshine covered the song for Lumidee's second album, Unexpected (2007). It was released as the lead single from Unexpected in the US and Europe on April 3, 2007.

=== Background ===
According to Lumidee, the idea to record a remake of Patrick Swayze's 1987 song "She's Like the Wind" was inspired by her European label when she recommended a collaboration with recording artist Tony Sunshine. She also said, "We'd been talking about working together but hadn't been able to. But he loved the idea of doing something with this song."

=== Music video ===
The music video for this version was directed by Dayo.

=== Track listing ===
1. "She's Like the Wind" (radio edit) – 4:17
2. "She's Like the Wind" (Spanglish version) – 3:53
3. "She's Like the Wind" (instrumental) – 4:18
4. "She's Like the Wind" (a cappella) – 4:15

=== Charts ===
Chart (2007)	Peak position
Belgium (Ultratop 50 Flanders)	14
Belgium (Ultratop 50 Wallonia)	22
Canada CHR/Top 40 (Billboard)	29
Denmark (Tracklisten)	6
US Billboard Hot 100	43
US Hot R&B/Hip-Hop Songs (Billboard)	75
US Latin Rhythm Airplay (Billboard)	30
US Pop Airplay (Billboard)	18
US Rhythmic Airplay (Billboard)	23
