= No Letting Go (song) =

2003 single by Wayne Wonder

Single by Wayne Wonder

from the album No Holding Back
- Released: 21 January 2003
- Genre: Reggae fusion; dancehall
- Length: 3:22
- Label: Atlantic; VP
- Songwriters: Steven "Lenky" Marsden; V.W. Charles
- Producer: Steven "Lenky" Marsden

Wayne Wonder singles chronology
"Something Different" / "The Train Is Coming" (1996)	"No Letting Go" (2003)	"Bounce Along" (2003)

"No Letting Go" is a song by Jamaican reggae fusion artist Wayne Wonder. The song was written by Wonder and Steven "Lenky" Marsden, and produced by Marsden. It was included on Wonder's 2003 studio album No Holding Back and was released as the lead single from the album. The single was released worldwide on 21 January 2003 and charted at a peak position of number three in the UK Singles Chart. It also peaked at number 11 in the Billboard Hot 100 in the United States.

It remains Wonder's most successful single to date. "I had been working with him [Marsden] for years when he was playing live music so when he switched over to music production, I transitioned with him. I actually gave him my first two door Civic. I signed over the title to him and everything, and he gave me my most successful hit.

The song was one of the many hits from the jumpy handclap riddim known as the Diwali Riddim, which was also produced by Marsden.

== Content ==
According to Wayne Wonder, the song is about a girl that he once knew but he doesn't mention her name. He said in an interview with MTV in 2003 "I just wrote this song [about a girl] without calling her name in the song because she always said to me, 'You are always [calling] these other girls' names.' I said, 'I don’t have to call your name, I'll just write a song and you can appreciate it.'" He was also amazed by the success that the song had achieved, saying "Everybody loves it, which is surprising to me. When I'm writing, I don’t think [about whether the song] will be a big hit."

== Reception ==
Blender magazine's called the song "a fetching love song that paired his [Wonder's] accented tenor with rough, digital funk". Rolling Stone were critical of the album but called this song "mesmerizing".

== Music video ==
The music video was directed by Director X, and filmed in Ocho Rios, Jamaica, in December 2002. Wonder said that "It took us 24 hours [to shoot]... It was raining in the morning and the shoot was supposed to start at like 6:30 a.m. and it never really got started until about maybe 8 o'clock... The video, to me, was a success; the dances, everyone enjoying themselves on the stage, there was no bad vibe."

== Remix ==
The official remix features rappers LL Cool J & Queen Duchess. The remix also uses more of the Diwali Riddim beat.

== Track listings ==
US CD single

1. "No Letting Go" (Album version) - 3:22
2. "No Letting Go" (Alternate mix) - 3:43

European enhanced CD single

1. "No Letting Go" (Album version) - 3:25
2. "No Letting Go" (Alternate mix) - 3:44
3. "No Letting Go" (Instrumental) - 3:40
4. "No Letting Go" (Video)

US 12-inch vinyl

A1. "No Letting Go" (Album version) - 3:22
B1. "No Letting Go" (Alternate mix) - 3:43
B2. "No Letting Go" (Instrumental) - 3:43

German 12-inch vinyl

A1. "No Letting Go" (Album version) - 3:22
A2. "No Letting Go" (Alternate mix) - 3:41
B1. "No Letting Go" (Instrumental) - 3:22
B2. "No Letting Go" (Alternate mix instrumental) - 3:41

US 12-inch vinyl (Remix)

A1. "No Letting Go (Remix)" (Club Mix featuring LL Cool J & Queen Duchess) - 3:29
A2. "No Letting Go (Remix)" (Radio Mix featuring LL Cool J & Queen Duchess) - 3:16
A3. "No Letting Go (Remix)" (Remix Instrumental) - 3:45
B1. "No Letting Go" (Album version) - 3:22
B2. "No Letting Go" (Instrumental) - 3:32

== Charts ==
=== Weekly charts ===
Chart (2003)	Peak position
Australia (ARIA)	51
Australian Urban (ARIA)	16
Belgium (Ultratop 50 Flanders)	21
Belgium (Ultratip Bubbling Under Wallonia)	2
Canada (Nielsen SoundScan)	26
Canada CHR (Nielsen BDS)	12
Europe (Eurochart Hot 100)	7
France (SNEP)	37
Germany (GfK)	31
Ireland (IRMA)	21
Netherlands (Dutch Top 40)	3
Netherlands (Single Top 100)	3
Scotland Singles (OCC)	14
Sweden (Sverigetopplistan)	23
Switzerland (Schweizer Hitparade)	24
UK Singles (OCC)	3
UK Hip Hop/R&B (OCC)	1
US Billboard Hot 100	11
US Hot R&B/Hip-Hop Songs (Billboard)	14
US Hot Rap Songs (Billboard)	7
US Pop Airplay (Billboard)	10
US Rhythmic Airplay (Billboard)	8
US Top 40 Tracks (Billboard)	10

Chart (2025)	Peak position
Jamaica Airplay (JAMMS)	3

=== Year-end charts ===
Chart (2003)	Position
Belgium (Ultratop 50 Flanders)	100
Netherlands (Dutch Top 40)	34
Netherlands (Single Top 100)	40
UK Singles (OCC)	49
UK Urban (Music Week)	24
US Billboard Hot 100	33
US Hot R&B/Hip-Hop Singles & Tracks (Billboard)	40
US Hot Rap Tracks (Billboard)	21
US Mainstream Top 40 (Billboard)	48
US Rhythmic Top 40 (Billboard)	39

== Certifications ==
Region	Certification	Certified units/sales
United Kingdom (BPI)	Platinum	600,000^{‡}
United States (RIAA)	Gold	500,000^{‡}
^{‡} Sales+streaming figures based on certification alone.

== Release history ==
Region	Date	Format(s)	Label(s)	Ref.
United States	21 January 2003	Rhythmic contemporary; urban radio	Atlantic; VP	
United Kingdom	16 June 2003	12-inch vinyl; CD	Atlantic; VP	
Australia	18 August 2003	CD	Atlantic; VP	

== Dirty Werk version ==
"No Letting Go"

Single by Dirty Werk
- Released: 5 August 2019
- Length: 3:05
- Label: Fly House
- Songwriters: Steve Smooth; DJ Bam Bam; Steven "Lenky" Marsden; V.W. Charles
- Producers: Steve Smooth; DJ Bam Bam

Dirty Werk singles chronology
"Stand Up" (2018)	"No Letting Go" (2019)

In 2019, the American house/remix duo Dirty Werk released an electro dance version of "No Letting Go", which is more of a cover that is mixed with portions taken from the original. The updated version gave Dirty Werk its second number one on Billboard's Dance Club Songs chart in the issue dated 2 November 2019.

=== Track listing ===
Remixes EP

1. "No Letting Go" (Dirty Werk House Remix) – 3:12
2. "No Letting Go" (Kue Radio Mix) – 3:44
3. "No Letting Go" (Alex Acosta Peak Hour Remix) – 3:21
4. "No Letting Go" (Lemi Vice Remix) – 3:34
5. "No Letting Go" (Dave Matthias Remix) – 3:03
6. "No Letting Go" (Perry Twins Remix) – 3:23

=== Charts ===
Chart (2019)	Peak position
US Dance Club Songs (Billboard)	1

== See also ==
- List of Billboard number-one dance songs of 2019
