= Natalya Panina =

Ukrainian ballroom dancer

Natalia Panina (also Natasha Panina, Natasja Panina) is a professional ballroom dancer from Ukraine, a DanceSport competitor in the Latin Dance category. As many professional competitors, she used to live and dance in several countries.

She danced with Ian Waite (2000–2002), Sandro Cavallini (2002–2003), and Maxim Doubovsky (1998–2000, amateur) & (2003–2006). She is currently dancing with Arkady Polezhaev.

She has won a number of first places in various national competitions in Professional Latin. As of 2006, her highest place in competitions of World/International rank was 4th (WD&DSC World Masters, 2002, Innsbruck, Austria).
