= Steven Marsden =

Steven "Lenky" Marsden
- Also known as: Lenky
- Born: Steven Michael Marsden; 1971 (age 54–55)
- Origin: Kingston, Jamaica
- Genre: Dancehall reggae
- Occupations: Record producer, songwriter
- Instruments: Percussion, synthesizer, keyboards, sampler
- Years active: 1998–present
- Children: Q Marsden

Steven "Lenky" Marsden (born 1971) is a Jamaican music producer and musician who specializes primarily in dancehall reggae music. He also arranges and remixes pop and hip hop songs. Marsden is the founder of the Jamaica-based label 40/40 Records and was a former member of singjay Buju Banton's band.

== Early life ==
Marsden grew up in the Windward Road area of East Kingston.

== Musical career ==
He is best known for his dancehall riddim Diwali, which had three songs that reached the number-one, -two, and -eleven spots on the Billboard charts featuring the artists Sean Paul, Lumidee (a slightly altered version eventually credited to Marsden), and Wayne Wonder, respectively. He also produced the Masterpiece riddim that became a hit because of Sean Paul's song "Ever Blazin'". He is a satellite member of Sly and Robbie's Taxi label.

Marsden was awarded the 2004 ASCAP songwriter of the year. He was recognized for "Never Leave You (Uh Oooh, Uh Oooh)", "No Letting Go", and "Get Busy", which also won for song of the year.

== Partial discography ==
- 1998 Heads Roll riddim
- 1999 Keep on Running riddim
- 2002 Diwali Riddim/XM 24
- 2002 Masterpiece Riddim
- 2003 Time Travel Riddim
