= Dance! (Lumidee and Fatman Scoop song) =

Single by Goleo VI presents Lumidee vs. Fatman Scoop

from the album FIFA World Cup 2006 Soundtrack
- Released: May 2, 2006
- Genre: Hip hop; dancehall
- Length: 3:37
- Label: Edel Music
- Songwriters: George Merrill, Shannon Rubicam, Cordell Burrell, Lumidee Cedeño, Isaac Freeman
- Producers: Reinhard Raith, Andreas Litterscheid

Lumidee singles chronology
"Siéntelo" (2004)	"Dance!" (2006)	"She's Like the Wind" (2007)

Fatman Scoop singles chronology
"Take the Lead (Wanna Ride)" (2006)	"Dance!" (2006)	"Behind the Cow" (2007)

"Dance!" is a song credited to Goleo VI featuring Lumidee and Fatman Scoop. It is included on the FIFA World Cup 2006 soundtrack album and contains Scorccio sample replays of the chorus of Whitney Houston's "I Wanna Dance with Somebody" and beats from the Coolie Dance riddim, both produced by Mark Summers.

== Track listing ==
Single CD-maxi

1. "Dance!" (Radio Edit) - 3:37
2. "Dance!" (Club Remix) - 4:54
3. Goleo VI & Pachanga - "Hip Hop Hooray" (Reggaeton Remix) - 4:31
4. Bonusclip - "Dance!" - 3:38

== Chart performance ==
=== Weekly charts ===
Chart (2006)	Peak position
Australia (ARIA)	60
Austria (Ö3 Austria Top 40)	5
Czech Republic (Rádio – Top 100)	13
Finland (Suomen virallinen lista)	5
Denmark (Tracklisten)	17
France (SNEP)	30
Germany (GfK)	5
Hungary (Single Top 40)	4
Hungary (Dance Top 40)	6
Italy (FIMI)	18
Netherlands (Single Top 100)	70
Slovakia (Rádio Top 100)	46
Switzerland (Schweizer Hitparade)	32

=== Year-end charts ===
Chart (2006)	Position
Austria (Ö3 Austria Top 40)	23
Germany (Official German Charts)	33
Hungary (Dance Top 40)	78
