= Almost Famous (Lumidee album) =

Studio album by Lumidee
- Released: June 24, 2003
- Genre: R&B
- Length: 41:07
- Label: Blackground; Straight Face; Latium; Universal
- Producer: DJ Tedsmooth; G48; Trendsetta; Buckwild; DJ Rei Double R

Lumidee chronology
Almost Famous (2003)	Unexpected (2007)

Singles from Almost Famous
- 1. "Never Leave You (Uh Oooh, Uh Oooh)" Released: May 12, 2003; 2. "Crashin' a Party" Released: December 23, 2003

Almost Famous is the debut studio album by American singer Lumidee, released by Blackground Records, Straight Face Records, Latium Entertainment and Universal Records on June 24, 2003.

It peaked at number twenty-two on the U.S. Billboard 200 chart and number eleven on the U.S. Billboard Top R&B/Hip-Hop Albums. It included the summer hit "Never Leave You (Uh Oooh, Uh Oooh)", which saw international success, topping the charts in Germany, Italy, the Netherlands, Belgium, Switzerland and reaching number 2 in the UK and number 3 on the U.S. Billboard Hot 100.

== Singles ==
- "Never Leave You (Uh Oooh, Uh Oooh)" is the debut single and the first single released from the album. It was released worldwide on August 4, 2003.
- "Crashin' A Party" was the second single released from the album. It was released to radio on December 23, 2003.

== Critical reception ==
Professional ratings
Review scores
Source	Rating
AllMusic	2/5 stars
Rolling Stone	2/5 stars

Almost Famous received two out of five stars by AllMusic citing, "Otherwise, Almost Famous is simply so-so R&B that never recalls the single's appeal but is not the disaster that albums surrounding fluke hits can turn into". Rolling Stone also gave it a two out of five rating.

== Track listing ==
Almost Famous track listing
No.	Title	Writer(s)	Producer(s)	Length
1.	"Almost Famous" (Interlude by DJ Tedsmooth)	Teddy Mendez, Edwin Perez	DJ Tedsmooth, Trendsetta	0:53
2.	"Honestly"	Lumidee Cedeño, Mendez, Perez	DJ Tedsmooth, Trendsetta	2:41
3.	"Crashin' a Party" (featuring N.O.R.E. & DJ Tedsmooth)	Cedeño, Victor Santiago, Mendez, Perez	DJ Tedsmooth, Trendsetta	3:13
4.	"Never Leave You (Uh Oooh, Uh Oooh)"	Cedeño, Mendez, Perez	DJ Tedsmooth, Trendsetta	3:04
5.	"For Keeps"	Cedeño, Mendez, Perez	DJ Tedsmooth, Trendsetta	3:01
6.	"Go with Me" (featuring Handsome Joe)	Cedeño, Joseph Johnson, Mendez, Perez	DJ Tedsmooth, Trendsetta	4:09
7.	"Only for Your Good"	Cedeño, Anthony Best, Perez	Buckwild	3:44
8.	"Suppose to Do"	Cedeño, Gerry Goffin, Michael Masser, Mendez, Perez	DJ Tedsmooth, Trendsetta	0:58
9.	"Air to Breathe"	Cedeño, Mendez, Perez	DJ Tedsmooth, Trendsetta	2:51
10.	"My Last Thug"	Cedeño, Mendez, Perez	DJ Tedsmooth, Trendsetta	4:24
11.	"Break Away"	Cedeño, Mendez, Perez	DJ Tedsmooth, Trendsetta	5:41
12.	"Me and You"	Cedeño, Mendez, Perez	DJ Tedsmooth, Trendsetta, (Co-prod.) DJ Rei Double R	2:47
13.	"Never Leave You (Uh Oooh, Uh Oooh) (Remix)" (featuring Busta Rhymes & Fabolous)	Cedeño, Mendez, Perez, Trevor Smith, John Jackson	DJ Tedsmooth, Trendsetta	3:32
Total length:				41:07

UK bonus track
No.	Title	Writer(s)	Producer(s)	Length
14.	"Honestly (Remix)" (featuring N.O.R.E)	Cedeño, Perez, Mendez, Santiago	DJ Tedsmooth, Trendsetta	2:41

== Charts ==
Weekly chart performance for Almost Famous
Chart (2003)	Peak position
Dutch Albums (Album Top 100)	37
French Albums (SNEP)	148
German Albums (Offizielle Top 100)	37
Italian Albums (FIMI)	46
Swiss Albums (Schweizer Hitparade)	24
UK Albums (OCC)	70
UK R&B Albums (OCC)	19
US Billboard 200	22
US Billboard Top R&B/Hip-Hop Albums	11
