= Kool Savas discography =

This is the discography of hip hop artist Kool Savas, from Germany with Turkish descent.

== Studio albums ==
Year	Title	Chart positions			Sales
Year	Title	GER	AUT	SWI	Sales
2002	Der beste Tag meines Lebens: Released: 2002; Label: Format: CD	6	—	—	150,000+
2004	Die besten Tage sind gezählt: Released: 2004; Label: Format: CD	17	—	44	50,000+
2007	Tot oder Lebendig: Released: November 1, 2007; Label: Opik; Format: CD, digital download	10	51	13	60,000+
2011	Aura: Released: 2011; Label: Formats: CD, digital download	1	6	1	100,000+
2014	Märtyrer: Released: 2014; Label: Formats: CD, digital download	1	3	1	100,000+
2019	KKS: Released: 8 February 2019; Label: Essah Media GmbH; Format: CD, digital download	1	2	1	
2021	Aghori: Released: 19 February 2021; Label: Essah Media GmbH; Format: CD, digital download	1	1	2	

== Mixtapes ==
Year	Title	Chart positions			Sales
Year	Title	GER	AUT	SWI	Sales
2005	Die John Bello Story: Released: 2005 (2008 as premium edition); Label: Formats: CD, digital download	10	45	13	60,000+
2008	Die John Bello Story 2: Released: 2008; Label: Formats: CD, digital download	10	45	13	50,000+
2010	Die John Bello Story 3: Released: 2010; Label: Formats: CD, digital download	4	10	7	80,000+
2016	Essahdamus: Released: 28 October 2016; Label: Formats: CD, digital download	3	3	3	

== Collaboration albums ==
Year	Title	Chart positions			Sales
Year	Title	GER	AUT	SWI	Sales
2001	NLP (with M.O.R.)	—	—	—	
2003	Nur Noch 24 Stunden (with Freunde der Sonne)	86	—	—	
2005	One (with Azad)	5	32	33	
2006	Optik Takeover! (with Optik Army)	5	32	33	
2012	Gespaltene Persönlichkeit (as Xavas, a duo with Xavier Naidoo)	1	3	1	
2017	Royal Bunker (with Sido)	1	1	2	

== Extended plays and LPs ==
Year	Album details
1997	Hoes, Flows, Moneytoes: With Westberlin Maskulin; Released: 1997, 1999 (re-release as LP); Label: Format: EP, LP
2000	Warum rappst du?: Label: Format: EP
2000	Battlekings: With Westberlin Maskulin; Label: Format: LP
2001	Haus & Boot: Label: Format: EP

== Singles ==
Solo

Year	Title	Chart positions			Album
Year	Title	GER	AUT	SWI	Album
2000	"King of Rap"				
2000	"L.M.S/Schwule Rapper"				Warum rappst du?
2002	"Keiner außer uns"				
2002	"Till' Ab Joe"				
2003	"Optik Anthem" (feat. Optik Crew)				
2003	"Der beste Tag meines Lebens" (feat. Valezka)				
2003	"Crashin' a Party" (feat. Lumidee)				
2004	"Die besten Tage sind gezählt" (feat. Lumidee)				Die besten Tage sind gezählt
2004	"Da bin, da bleib"				Die besten Tage sind gezählt
2004	"77 Minutes of Strugglin" (with Moses Pelham & Illmat!c)				
2005	"Das Urteil"				
2005	"Monstershit" (with Azad)				One
2005	"All 4 One" (with Azad)	4	24	85	One
2005	"Guck my man" (with Azad)				One
2006	"Das ist O.R." (with Optik Crew)				
2006	"Komm mit mir" (feat. Ercandize)	26	65	—	
2006	"Wie er" (with DJ Sweap & DJ Pfund 500)				
2007	"Der Beweis"				
2007	"Tot oder Lebendig"				Tot oder Lebendig
2008	"Melodie" (feat. Meo Mitchell & Senna)	68			Tot oder Lebendig
2008	"On Top" (feat. Azad)				Tot oder Lebendig
2008	"Krone" (feat. Franky Kubrick, Moe Mitchel & Amaris)				John Bello Story 2
2009	"Rapfilm"				
2011	"Aura"	14	33	13	Aura
2014	"Märtyrer"	51	55	—	Märtyrer
2014	"Limit" (feat. Alex Prince)	61		61	Märtyrer
2014	"Es ist wahr / S a zu dem V"	82			Märtyrer
2014	"Intro" (feat. Tim Bendzko)	85			Märtyrer
2014	"Zweifel und Bestätigung"	93			Märtyrer
2014	"Matrix"	100			Märtyrer
2016	"Triumph" (feat. Sido, Azad & Adesse)	28	28	31	Essahdamus
2017	"Royal Bunker" (with Sido)	65	—	83	Royal Bunker
2017	"Normale Leute" (with Sido feat. Marteria)	69	—	95	Royal Bunker
2017	"Neue Welt" (with Sido feat. Lakmann)	29	48	59	Royal Bunker
2017	"Haste nich gesehen" (with Sido)	63	—	67	Royal Bunker
2017	"Jedes Wort ist Gold wert" (with Sido)	72	—	62	Royal Bunker
2017	"Unterschied" (with Sido)	90	—	—	Royal Bunker
2017	"Wenn ich oben bin" (with Sido)	93	—	—	Royal Bunker
2017	"Hall of Fame" (with Sido)	98	—	—	Royal Bunker
2017	"Freund / Feind" (with Sido)	100	—	—	Royal Bunker
2018	"KKS"	70	—	—	
2019	"Deine Mutter" (featuring Nessi)	16	56	49	
2019	"High" (with Sido and Samra)	16	—	18	
2020	"Brechen mich nicht" (featuring Mel)	40	—	93	
2020	"AMG" (with Alies)	19	50	47	Aghori
2020	"Nicht erinnern"	87	—	—	Aghori
2020	"Dicka was" (with Sido and Nessi)	14	48	43	Aghori
2021	"Brachland"	20	—	34	Aghori
2021	"Optik 4 Life"	—	—	93	Aghori

Collaborative singles as Xavas (Xavas being Xavier Naidoo and Kool Savas)

Year	Title	Chart positions			Album
Year	Title	GER	AUT	SWI	Album
2012	"Schau nicht mehr zurück"	2	14	3	Gespaltene Persönlichkeit
2012	"Lass nicht los"	—	45	—	Gespaltene Persönlichkeit
2012	"Die Zukunft trägt meinen Namen"	—	47	—	Gespaltene Persönlichkeit
2012	"Wenn es Nacht ist"	—	52	—	Gespaltene Persönlichkeit
2012	"Wage es zu glauben"	34	45	37	Gespaltene Persönlichkeit

== Featured singles ==
Year	Title	Artist	Chart positions			Album
Year	Title	Artist	GER	AUT	SWI	Album
2000	"Fehdehandschuh"	Creutzfeld & Jakob feat. Kool Savas				
2001	"That smut Part 2"	Smut Peddlers feat. Kool Savas				
2002	"D.U.T."	J-Luv feat. Kool Savas				
2004	"OK!"	Melbeatz feat. Kool Savas & Samy Deluxe				
2016	"Masafaka"	Sido feat. Kool Savas	34	47	78	Das goldene Album
2016	"Spiegel"	KC Rebell feat. Kool Savas	42		60	Abstand
2018	"Is It Love?"	Rea Garvey feat. Kool Savas	20	18	12	Neon
2018	"4 Uhr Nachts"	Sido feat. Haftbefehl & Kool Savas	25	43	32	Kronjuwelen

== Sources ==
- https://web.archive.org/web/20080630065823/http://austriancharts.at/
- https://web.archive.org/web/20091212080952/http://swisscharts.com/
