= Never Leave You (Uh Oooh, Uh Oooh) =

2003 single by Lumidee

Single by Lumidee

from the album Almost Famous
- Released: May 12, 2003
- Genre: R&B; dancehall
- Length: 3:06
- Label: Universal; Straight Face
- Songwriters: Lumidee Cedeño; Teddy Mendez; Edwin Perez; Steven Marsden; Remix: Trevor Smith; John Jackson
- Producers: DJ Tedsmooth; Trendsetta

Lumidee singles chronology
"Never Leave You (Uh Oooh, Uh Oooh)" (2003)	"Crashin' a Party" (2003)

Fabolous singles chronology
"Can't Let You Go" (2003)	"Never Leave You (Uh Oooh, Uh Oooh)" (2003)	"Into You" (2003)

Busta Rhymes singles chronology
"Oh!" (2003)	"Never Leave You (Uh Oooh, Uh Oooh)" (2003)	"Lovely Day" (2003)

Music video
- "Never Leave You (Uh Oooh, Uh Oooh)" on YouTube

"Never Leave You (Uh Oooh, Uh Oooh)" is a song by American recording artist Lumidee, released as her debut single on May 12, 2003, from her first album, Almost Famous (2003). The song features a sample from Diwali Riddim by Lenky, released in 2002. The official remix features Busta Rhymes and Fabolous. "Never Leave You (Uh Oooh, Uh Oooh)" peaked at number three on the US Billboard Hot 100 and charted internationally, topping the charts of Flanders, Germany, Italy, the Netherlands, and Switzerland.

== Background ==
The original mix of the song was recorded by DJ Tedsmooth, a native of Spanish Harlem where Lumidee was raised, for DJ Tedsmooth's independent record label Straight Face. The song became the number-one requested song on many New York radio stations. The success resulted in many major record label offering deals to both Lumidee and DJ Tedsmooth. After signing with Universal, the song was remixed with guest appearances by Busta Rhymes and Fabolous. "Never Leave You" was incorporated into the 2010 re-release of the Diwali riddim album on Greensleeves/VP Records. It included other songs derived from the Diwali riddim, along with Sean Paul's "Get Busy," which was a late entry that never made the original release.

== Composition ==
"Never Leave You (Uh Ooh, Uh Ooh)" is an R&B song written by Lumidee Cedeño, Teddy "Tedsmooth" Mendez and Eddie Perez, and features a prominent dancehall reggae riddim called "Diwali" written by Steven "Lenky" Marsden, although it is slightly altered from the original riddim. Belgian artist Luc van Acker made allegations that the song resembles "Zanna," a song he wrote. However, in an interview he said Belgian anti-piracy agency SABAM advised him not to waste money on a lawsuit.

== Chart performance ==
"Never Leave You (Uh Ooh, Uh Ooh)" debuted at number 61 on the US Billboard Hot 100. Due to the increase of radio plays for the song, it later ascended up the chart from number ten to number five, before peaking at number three on the Billboard Hot 100. In the United Kingdom, the song debuted and peaked at number two on the UK Singles Chart on August 3, 2003 – for the week ending date August 9, 2003 – beaten to the summit by Blu Cantrell and Sean Paul's "Breathe". The song reached the top spot on the European Hot 100, as well as topping the charts of Flanders, Germany, Italy, the Netherlands, and Switzerland. The song additionally entered the top 20 in France, Norway, Sweden and Spain, the top 30 in Canada and New Zealand, and the top 40 in Australia.

== Music video ==
The music video of "Never Leave You (Uh Oooh, Uh Oooh)" was directed by Nzingha Stewart and it features American actor J.D. Williams as Lumidee's love interest.

== Track listings ==
US maxi-CD single

1. "Never Leave You (Uh Oooh, Uh Oooh)" – 3:04
2. "Never Leave You" (DJ Kazzanova reggaeton mix) – 3:12
3. "Never Leave You (Aqui me quedo)" (Spanish mix) – 3:04
4. "Never Leave You" (DJ Skribble & Anthony Acid mix) – 3:42

US 12-inch single

A1. "Never Leave You (Uh Ooh, Uh Oooh!)" (main) – 3:04
B1. "Never Leave You (Uh Ooh, Uh Oooh!)" (instrumental) – 3:02
B2. "Never Leave You (Uh Ooh, Uh Oooh!)" (acappella) – 2:28

UK CD single

1. "Never Leave You (Uh Oooh, Uh Oooh)" – 3:04
2. "Never Leave You (Uh Oooh, Uh Oooh)" (Uh Oooh remix featuring Busta Rhymes and Fabolous) – 3:32
3. "Never Leave You (Uh Oooh, Uh Oooh)" (instrumental) – 3:02
4. "Never Leave You (Uh Oooh, Uh Oooh)" (video) – 4:00

UK 12-inch single

A1. "Never Leave You (Uh Oooh, Uh Oooh)" – 3:04
A2. "Never Leave You (Uh Oooh, Uh Oooh)" (acappella) – 2:28
B1. "Never Leave You (Uh Oooh, Uh Oooh)" (Uh Oooh remix featuring Busta Rhymes and Fabolous) – 3:32
B2. "Never Leave You (Uh Oooh, Uh Oooh)" (instrumental) – 3:02

European CD single

1. "Never Leave You (Uh Oooh, Uh Oooh)" (original mix) – 3:04
2. "Never Leave You (Uh Oooh, Uh Oooh)" (Uh Oooh remix featuring Busta Rhymes and Fabolous) – 3:32

Australian CD single

1. "Never Leave You (Uh Oooh, Uh Oooh)" (original mix) – 3:04
2. "Never Leave You (Uh Oooh, Uh Oooh)" (Uh Oooh remix featuring Busta Rhymes and Fabolous) – 3:32
3. "Never Leave You (Uh Oooh, Uh Oooh)" (DJ Skribble & Anthony Acid remix—radio cut) – 3:47
4. "Never Leave You (Uh Oooh, Uh Oooh)" (video)

== Personnel ==
- Lumidee – lead vocals, background vocals
- DJ Tedsmooth – producer
- Trendsetta – producer, drums, programming, mixing, engineering, keyboards
- Stevie J. – engineering, mixing
- Jamie "S.S" Garcia – mixing assistant

== Charts ==
=== Weekly charts ===
Chart (2003)	Peak position
Australia (ARIA)	33
Austria (Ö3 Austria Top 40)	4
Belgium (Ultratop 50 Flanders)	1
Belgium (Ultratop 50 Wallonia)	8
Canada (Nielsen SoundScan)	23
Canada CHR (Nielsen BDS)	4
Croatia (HRT)	4
Czech Republic (IFPI)	5
Denmark (Tracklisten)	2
Europe (Eurochart Hot 100)	1
France (SNEP)	12
Germany (GfK)	1
Hungary (Dance Top 40)	2
Hungary (Single Top 40)	9
Ireland (IRMA)	17
Italy (FIMI)	1
Netherlands (Dutch Top 40)	1
Netherlands (Single Top 100)	1
New Zealand (Recorded Music NZ)	25
Norway (VG-lista)	15
Romania (Romanian Top 100)	2
Scottish Singles Sales (Official Charts)	7
Spain (Promusicae)	20
Sweden (Sverigetopplistan)	18
Switzerland (Schweizer Hitparade)	1
UK Singles (Official Charts)	2
UK Hip Hop/R&B (Official Charts)	2
US Billboard Hot 100	3
US Dance Airplay (Billboard)	4
US Hot R&B/Hip-Hop Songs (Billboard)	9
US Pop Airplay (Billboard)	15
US Rhythmic Airplay (Billboard)	5

=== Year-end charts ===
Chart (2003)	Position
Austria (Ö3 Austria Top 40)	30
Belgium (Ultratop 50 Flanders)	8
Belgium (Ultratop 50 Wallonia)	60
Europe (Eurochart Hot 100)	9
Germany (Media Control GfK)	9
Italy (FIMI)	19
Netherlands (Dutch Top 40)	28
Netherlands (Single Top 100)	20
Romania (Romanian Top 100)	53
Sweden (Hitlistan)	80
Switzerland (Schweizer Hitparade)	7
UK Singles (OCC)	44
UK Urban (Music Week)	31
US Billboard Hot 100	41
US Hot R&B/Hip-Hop Singles & Tracks (Billboard)	47
US Mainstream Top 40 (Billboard)	71
US Rhythmic Top 40 (Billboard)	22

=== Decade-end charts ===
Chart (2000–2009)	Position
Germany (Media Control GfK)	80

== Certifications ==
Region	Certification	Certified units/sales
Belgium (BRMA)	Gold	25,000^{*}
Germany (BVMI)	Platinum	300,000^{‡}
Switzerland (IFPI Switzerland)	Gold	20,000^{^}
United Kingdom (BPI)	Gold	400,000^{‡}
^{*} Sales figures based on certification alone.^{^} Shipments figures based on certification alone.^{‡} Sales+streaming figures based on certification alone.

== Release history ==
Region	Date	Format(s)	Label(s)	Ref.
United States	May 12, 2003	Rhythmic contemporary radio	Universal	
United States	June 16, 2003	Contemporary hit radio	Universal	
United Kingdom	July 28, 2003	12-inch single; CD single; cassette single	Universal	
Germany	August 4, 2003	CD single	Universal	
United States	August 5, 2003	CD single	Universal	
Australia	August 25, 2003	CD single	Universal	
France	September 15, 2003	CD single	Universal	
United States	October 21, 2003	Digital download	Universal	

== See also ==
- Hot 100 number-one hits of 2003 (Europe)
- Ultratop 50 number-one hits of 2003
- Dutch Top 40 number-one hits of 2003
- Number-one hits of 2003 (Germany)
- FIMI number-one hits of 2003
- List of Swiss number-one hits of 2003
