= Speedy (musician) =

Puerto Rican reggaeton artist

Sir Speedy
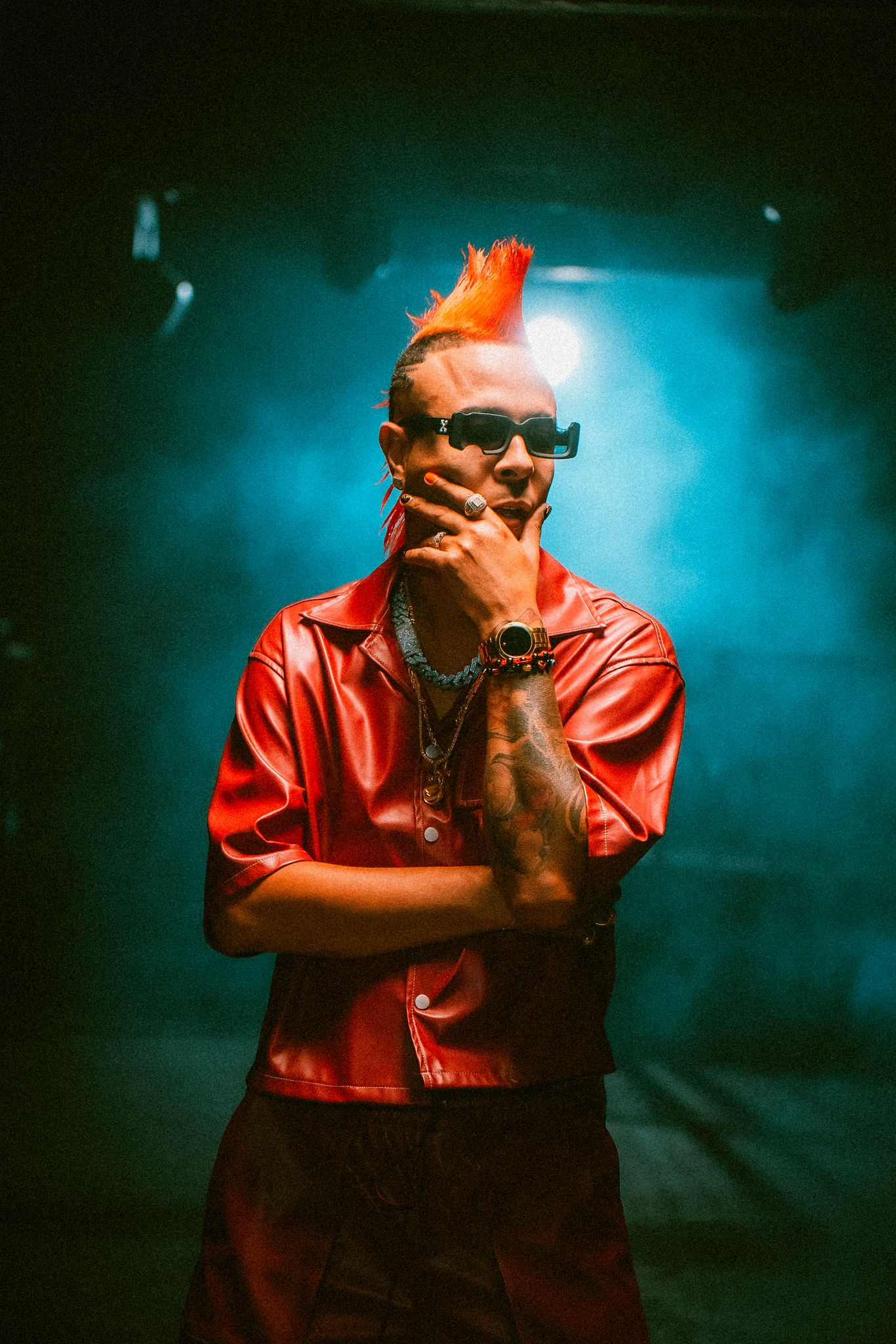
- Reggaetón artist Sir Speedy in 2025

Background information
- Born: Juan Antonio Ortiz García; September 10, 1983 (age 43); Holyoke, Massachusetts, U.S.
- Origin: Guayama, Puerto Rico
- Genres: Reggaeton, EDM trap, Guaracha, urbano, Latin hip hop
- Occupations: Singer, songwriter
- Instrument: Vocals
- Years active: 2000–present
- Labels: One Star Entertainment, Pina Records, Yoko Joe Records

Sir Speedy (born Juan Antonio Ortiz García on September 10, 1983) is a Puerto Rican reggaeton and urbano singer. He is considered one of the early contributors to the global growth of reggaetón in the 2000s.

One of Speedy's most recognized early hits is the track "Hagamos el Amor con la Ropa", released in 2001 as the title song of his debut album. The song gained popularity in Puerto Rico and Latin urban music circles and is widely considered his breakout single.

== Career ==
In 2005, Speedy gained international fame with the remix of the single "Siéntelo", originally featured on the 2001 compilation Sandunguero by DJ Blass. The remix, featuring Lumidee, reached the top 10 in several European countries, including Belgium, Finland, France, Switzerland, and the Netherlands. Billboard referred to it as "the first international reggaetón hit". PopMatters praised his 2005 album Nueva Generación as “an excellent example of what intelligent and sophisticated but unpretentious pop music can do”.

In the 2020s, Speedy experienced a resurgence in popularity, especially in Mexico, with a focus on blending Puerto Rican reggaetón with modern Mexican urbano music.

== Recent Work ==
In May 2025, Sir Speedy released the single "Como Mi Nena 2025" featuring Dani Flow, El Malilla, and El Bogueto, a modern reinterpretation of his early hit.

In July 2025, he followed with "Malicia", the second single from his upcoming album Temporada Naranja, described as a tribute to Mexican culture and reggaetón roots.

He was also featured in Wisin’s single "Quiere Perreo" from the album El Sobreviviente 3, contributing a modern version of his classic "Amor con la Ropa".

The album Temporada Naranja is expected to be released on September 15, 2025.

== Discography ==
=== Studio albums ===
- 2001: Haciendo El Amor Con La Ropa
- 2003: Dando Cocotazos
- 2005: Nueva Generación
- 2008: From PR 2 TR
- 2012: Ayer y Hoy
- 2018: Real Reggaetón
- 2025: Temporada Naranja (upcoming)

=== Mixtapes ===
- 2008: Mazakote Mixtape: Gold Edition Vol. 1

=== Selected Singles ===
- 2005: "Siéntelo (Remix)" feat. Lumidee
- 2007: "Suavemente (Remix)" feat. Elvis Crespo
- 2010: "Brulemua" feat. Guelo Star
- 2012: "Quico"
- 2013: "A Ella Le Gusta El Sex" feat. Polakan
- 2017: "De Lejos Se Te Ve" feat. Guelo Star
- 2018: "Magneto Sexual"
- 2019: "Se le Dio", "Rakata"
- 2020: "Quiero" ft. Ñengo Flow, Brray
- 2025: "Como Mi Nena 2025" ft. Dani Flow, El Malilla & El Bogueto
- 2025: "Malicia"
- 2025: "Quiere Perreo" (Wisin ft. Sir Speedy)
