= Lumidee =

American singer (born 1984)

- Born: Lumidee Cedeño; October 13, 1984 (age 41); New York City, U.S.
- Genre: R&B
- Occupations: Singer; songwriter
- Instrument: Vocals
- Years active: 2003–present
- Labels: Universal; TVT; Mach 1; Logy Music

Lumidee Cedeño (born October 13, 1984) is an American singer, best known for her 2003 single "Never Leave You (Uh Oooh, Uh Oooh)", which peaked at number 3 on the Billboard Hot 100 and led her to sign with Universal Records. The song preceded the release of her debut album, Almost Famous (2003), which saw mixed to negative critical reception and moderate commercial performance. Her second album, Unexpected (2007), saw a critical improvement despite a commercial decline, and was supported by the cover single "She's Like the Wind" (featuring Tony Sunshine).

== Early life ==
Cedeño was born in the East Harlem neighborhood of Upper Manhattan, New York City, of Puerto Rican descent. After her father died in 1995, she and her four siblings were raised by their grandparents. She began singing and rapping at the age of 12. She was diagnosed with rheumatoid arthritis at the age of 14, after she was misdiagnosed with lupus.

== Career ==
=== 2003–2006: Almost Famous ===
After graduating high school, she collaborated with a local neighborhood producer named DJ Tedsmooth to record her debut single for an independent record label called Straight Face. She signed with Universal Records, where she released her debut album titled Almost Famous on June 24, 2003. Her debut single, "Never Leave You (Uh Oooh, Uh Oooh)", peaked at number 3 in the United States and number 2 in the United Kingdom, but it was her only hit until the 2007 release of "She's Like the Wind". According to Nielsen SoundScan, Almost Famous sold 276,000 copies in the U.S.

For the next few years, Lumidee was not in the mainstream music industry in the U.S., instead veering more towards reggaeton and dancehall music. After her hit single "Never Leave You (Uh Oooh, Uh Oooh)" faded, Lumidee went overseas to continue her musical career in Belgium, Germany, France, and the Netherlands. She released multiple mixtapes during the years, which was a mixtape consisting of new material, freestyles, and tracks from Lumidee was also featured on several tracks in this area, having some success in Europe.

In 2006, Lumidee released a song for the FIFA World Cup album soundtrack entitled "Dance!". It featured a sample of Whitney Houston's song, "I Wanna Dance with Somebody (Who Loves Me)". The song was a club hit around Europe, successfully entering the charts in the countries where it was officially released. In the summer of 2006, Lumidee was featured on Frankie Cutlass' 2006 remix of his classic club hit anthem, "Puerto Rico" (featuring Joell Ortiz, Voltio, and Yomo Toro).

=== 2007: Unexpected ===
In 2007, Lumidee was named youth ambassador of the New York Arthritis Foundation's Arthritis Walk. On April 17, she released her second album, Unexpected, under TVT Records. In an interview with Vibe, Lumidee spoke about signing with TVT stating, "TVT Records is the perfect way for me to come back and again I'm coming out of left field, just like with "Never Leave You (Uh Oh)," Nobody ever thought of me coming back on a street credible label like TVT, alongside acts like Pitbull, Lil Jon and the Ying Yang Twins. Actually, nobody ever thought of me really even coming back, period." The U.S. single, "She's Like the Wind", peaked at 43, but it was not released in Europe. There, the label released the single "Crazy" (featuring Pitbull), which had moderate chart success in Germany, Austria, and the United Kingdom. Lumidee made an appearance on MTV Cribs, showing her New Jersey home, which aired on August 6, 2007.

=== 2009–present ===
On May 13, 2009, Lumidee released a mixtape called I'm Up, Vol. 1 from her label, Logy Music Entertainment. In late 2009, Lumidee worked on another mixtape entitled Luminadee, which was released exclusively on Coast2CoastMixtapes.com in early January 2010. Lumidee was working on an album which was set to be released sometime in 2010, but ultimately it did not materialize. In 2011, she appeared in a re-work of Remady's dance hit "No Superstar". In 2011, she collaborated with rapper Somaya Reece on the single "Dale Mami". The video debuted on mun2's The Urban Tip on January 11, 2012. Universal Australia, Toughstuff Germany, and Sony Scandinavia signed "Ring My Bell" by Michael Fall (featuring Lumidee, Rick Elback, and Aziza) for release in 2014. On June 24, 2014, in an interview with Kevin Apaza of Directlyrics.com, Lumidee mentioned starting her own label Logy Music Entertainment. After leaving her previous major label, she will release her EP La Luz through her label Logy Music Entertainment.

== Artistry ==
Lumidee cites Lauryn Hill, Missy Elliott, MC Lyte, and Mary J. Blige as her major influences.

== Discography ==
- Almost Famous (2003)
- Unexpected (2007)
- 10 13 (2021)
