= List of Billboard Hot 100 top-ten singles in 2003 =

This is a list of singles that charted in the top ten of the Billboard Hot 100 during 2003.

Jay-Z scored five top ten hits during the year with "'03 Bonnie & Clyde", "Excuse Me Miss", "Crazy in Love", "Frontin'", and "Change Clothes", the most among all other artists.

== Top-ten singles ==
Key

- ↑ – indicates single's top 10 entry was also its Hot 100 debut
- † – indicates Best performing song of the year
- (#) – 2003 year-end top 10 single position and rank

List of Billboard Hot 100 top ten singles which peaked in 2003
Top ten entry date	Single	Artist(s)	Peak	Peak date	Weeks in top ten
Singles from 2002
December 7	"Air Force Ones"	Nelly featuring Kyjuan, Ali and Murphy Lee	3	January 4	10
December 21	"Beautiful"	Christina Aguilera	2	February 1	12
December 28	"Bump, Bump, Bump"	B2K featuring P. Diddy	1	February 1	11
Singles from 2003
January 4	"Love of My Life (An Ode to Hip-Hop)"	Erykah Badu featuring Common	9	January 4	1
January 11	"Landslide"^{[A]}	Dixie Chicks	7	March 8	10
January 25	"All I Have"	Jennifer Lopez featuring LL Cool J	1	February 8	12
January 25	"Cry Me a River"	Justin Timberlake	3	February 1	9
January 25	"I'm With You"	Avril Lavigne	4	February 1	10
February 1	"Mesmerize"	Ja Rule featuring Ashanti	2	February 15	10
February 1	"Miss You" (#8)	Aaliyah	3	April 5	13
February 15	"In da Club" † (#1)	50 Cent	1	March 8	17
February 22	"Gossip Folks"	Missy Elliott featuring Ludacris	8	March 8	6
March 15	"Ignition (Remix)" (#2)	R. Kelly	2	March 29	15
March 15	"Picture"^{[B]} (#9)	Kid Rock featuring Sheryl Crow or Allison Moorer	4	April 5	10
March 29	"How You Gonna Act Like That"	Tyrese	7	March 29	4
April 5	"Excuse Me Miss"	Jay-Z featuring Pharrell	8	April 12	3
April 5	"Get Busy" (#3)	Sean Paul	1	May 10	17
April 5	"When I'm Gone" (#5)	3 Doors Down	4	April 26	10
April 12	"Beautiful"^{[C]}	Snoop Dogg featuring Pharrell and Uncle Charlie Wilson	6	April 26	4
April 19	"21 Questions"	50 Cent featuring Nate Dogg	1	May 31	13
April 26	"Can't Let You Go"	Fabolous featuring Lil' Mo and Mike Shorey	4	May 31	9
April 26	"I Know What You Want"	Busta Rhymes and Mariah Carey featuring The Flipmode Squad	3	May 31	11
May 3	"God Bless the U.S.A." ↑	American Idol Finalists	4	May 3	1
May 3	"Rock Your Body"	Justin Timberlake	5	May 10	7
May 10	"Bring Me to Life" (#10)	Evanescence	5	June 7	12
May 31	"Magic Stick"	Lil' Kim featuring 50 Cent	2	July 12	12
June 14	"Crazy in Love" (#4)	Beyoncé featuring Jay-Z	1	July 12	16
June 14	"Unwell" (#6)	Matchbox Twenty	5	July 19	17
June 21	"Rock wit U (Awww Baby)"	Ashanti	2	August 2	9
June 28	"This Is the Night" ↑	Clay Aiken	1	June 28	4
June 28	"Flying Without Wings" ↑	Ruben Studdard	2	June 28	2
July 12	"Right Thurr" (#7)	Chingy	2	August 9	17
July 12	"So Gone"	Monica	10	July 12	1
July 19	"Miss Independent"	Kelly Clarkson	9	July 19	3
July 19	"Never Leave You (Uh Oooh, Uh Oooh)"	Lumidee featuring Fabolous and Busta Rhymes	3	August 16	7
July 26	"In Those Jeans"	Ginuwine	8	August 2	5
August 2	"Drift Away"	Uncle Kracker featuring Dobie Gray	9	August 2	1
August 2	"P.I.M.P."	50 Cent featuring Snoop Dogg	3	August 23	12
August 9	"Get Low"	Lil Jon & the Eastside Boyz featuring Ying Yang Twins	2	October 25	16
August 9	"Where Is the Love?"	The Black Eyed Peas	8	August 9	9
August 16	"Into You"	Fabolous featuring Ashanti or Tamia	4	September 20	10
August 23	"Frontin'"	Pharrell Williams featuring Jay-Z	5	September 20	9
August 23	"Shake Ya Tailfeather"	Nelly, P. Diddy and Murphy Lee	1	September 6	12
September 6	"Baby Boy"	Beyoncé featuring Sean Paul	1	October 4	15
October 4	"Damn!"	YoungBloodZ featuring Lil Jon	4	November 1	10
October 11	"Stand Up"	Ludacris featuring Shawnna	1	December 6	16
October 18	"Here Without You"	3 Doors Down	5	November 8	17
October 25	"Holidae In"	Chingy featuring Ludacris and Snoop Dogg	3	November 8	10
October 25	"Rain on Me"	Ashanti	7	November 8	4
October 25	"Why Don't You & I"	Santana featuring Alex Band or Chad Kroeger	8	October 25	4
November 15	"Walked Outta Heaven"	Jagged Edge	6	December 20	10
November 22	"Hey Ya!"	Outkast	1	December 13	17
November 22	"Step in the Name of Love"	R. Kelly	9	December 13	4
November 22	"Suga Suga"	Baby Bash featuring Frankie J	7	December 6	11
December 13	"Milkshake"	Kelis	3	December 27	9
December 27	"Change Clothes"	Jay-Z	10	December 27	1

=== 2002 peaks ===
List of Billboard Hot 100 top ten singles in 2003 which peaked in 2002
Top ten entry date	Single	Artist(s)	Peak	Peak date	Weeks in top ten
October 12	"Work It"	Missy Elliott	2	November 16	16
October 19	"Lose Yourself"	Eminem	1	November 9	16
October 19	"Underneath It All"	No Doubt featuring Lady Saw	3	November 23	12
November 2	"The Game of Love"	Santana featuring Michelle Branch	5	November 30	11
November 23	"Jenny from the Block"	Jennifer Lopez featuring Jadakiss and Styles	3	December 7	9
December 7	"'03 Bonnie & Clyde"	Jay-Z featuring Beyoncé	4	December 28	11
December 14	"Don't Mess with My Man"	Nivea featuring Brian and Brandon Casey	8	December 21	7

=== 2004 peaks ===
List of Billboard Hot 100 top ten singles in 2003 which peaked in 2004
Top ten entry date	Single	Artist(s)	Peak	Peak date	Weeks in top ten
November 8	"The Way You Move"	Outkast featuring Sleepy Brown	1	February 14	21
December 20	"You Don't Know My Name"	Alicia Keys	3	January 31	11

== Artists with most top-ten songs ==
List of artists by total songs peaking in the top-ten
Artist	Numbers of songs
Jay-Z	5
50 Cent	4
Fabolous	3
Snoop Dogg	3
Ashanti	3
Beyoncé	3
Ludacris	3
Justin Timberlake	2
Busta Rhymes	2
Nelly	2
P. Diddy	2
Murphy Lee	2
Sean Paul	2
Lil Jon	2
R. Kelly	2
Missy Elliott	2
Santana	2
Jennifer Lopez	2
Outkast	2

== See also ==
- 2003 in music
- List of Billboard Hot 100 number ones of 2003
- Billboard Year-End Hot 100 singles of 2003

== Notes ==
^{A} The single re-entered the top ten on the week ending February 8, 2003.
^{B} The single re-entered the top ten on the week ending May 10, 2003.
^{C} The single re-entered the top ten on the week ending May 17, 2003.
