= Billboard Year-End Hot Rap Tracks of 2003 =

American music chart

This is a list of Billboard magazine's Top Hot Rap Tracks of 2003.

No.	Title	Artist(s)
1	"In da Club"	50 Cent
2	"Get Low"	Lil Jon & the East Side Boyz featuring Ying Yang Twins
3	"Right Thurr"	Chingy
4	"Get Busy"	Sean Paul
5	"21 Questions"	50 Cent featuring Nate Dogg
6	"Can't Let You Go"	Fabolous featuring Lil' Mo and Mike Shorey
7	"P.I.M.P."	50 Cent
8	"I Know What You Want"	Busta Rhymes and Mariah Carey featuring Flipmode Squad
9	"Magic Stick"	Lil' Kim featuring 50 Cent
10	"Into You"	Fabolous featuring Tamia or Ashanti
11	"Shake Ya Tailfeather"	Nelly, P. Diddy and Murphy Lee
12	"Beautful"	Snoop Dogg featuring Pharrell and Charlie Wilson
13	"Damn!"	YoungBloodZ featuring Lil Jon
14	"Stand Up"	Ludacris featuring Shawnna
15	"Air Force Ones"	Nelly featuring Kyjuan, Ali and Murphy Lee
16	"Excuse Me Miss"	Jay-Z
17	"Wanksta"	50 Cent
18	"Mesmerize"	Ja Rule featuring Ashanti
19	"Gossip Folks"	Missy Elliott featuring Ludacris
20	"Work It"	Missy Elliott
21	"No Letting Go"	Wayne Wonder
22	"I Can"	Nas
23	"The Jump Off"	Lil' Kim featuring Mr. Cheeks
24	"Can't Stop, Won't Stop"	Young Gunz
25	"'03 Bonnie & Clyde"	Jay-Z featuring Beyoncé Knowles

== See also ==
- 2003 in music
- Billboard Year-End Hot 100 singles of 2003
- Billboard Year-End Hot R&B/Hip-Hop Singles & Tracks of 2003
- List of Billboard number-one rap singles of 2003
