= YoungBloodZ discography =

This is the discography of southern rap duo YoungBloodZ.

== Albums ==
=== Studio albums ===
Year	Album details	Peak chart positions			Certifications (sales threshold)
Year	Album details	US	US R&B	US Rap	Certifications (sales threshold)
1999	Against da Grain: Release date: October 12, 1999; Label: LaFace Records	92	21	*	
2003	Drankin' Patnaz: Release date: August 26, 2003; Label: So So Def Recordings, Arista Records	5	1	*	RIAA: Gold
2005	Ev'rybody Know Me: Release date: December 13, 2005; Label: LaFace Records	44	7	4	
"—" denotes releases that did not chart * - denotes ineligible Rap Albums Chart position before chart existed in 2004

=== Compilation albums ===
Year	Album details
2006	Still Grippin' tha Grain: The Best Of: Release date: November 21, 2006; Label: LaFace Records

== Singles ==
Year	Single	Peak chart positions			Certifications (sales threshold)	Album
Year	Single	US	US R&B	US Rap	Certifications (sales threshold)	Album
1999	"U-Way (How We Do It)"	—	46	—		Against Da Grain
2000	"85" (featuring Jim Crow & Big Boi)	—	53	—		Against Da Grain
2002	"Cadillac Pimpin'"	—	93	—		Drankin' Patnaz
2003	"Damn!" (featuring Lil Jon)	4	2	1	RIAA: Gold	Drankin' Patnaz
2003	"Lean Low" (featuring Backbone)	—	94	—		Drankin' Patnaz
2005	"Datz Me" (featuring Young Buck)	—	78	—		Ev'rybody Know Me
2005	"Presidential"	81	26	20		Ev'rybody Know Me
2006	"Chop Chop"	—	80	—		Ev'rybody Know Me
2008	"Ridin' Thru Atlanta" (featuring T.I.)	—	—	—		Bad Influence (unreleased)
"—" denotes releases that did not chart

=== As featured artist ===
List of singles as featured artist, with selected chart positions, showing year released and album name
Title	Year	Peak chart positions		Album
Title	Year	US	US R&B	Album
"Okay" (Nivea featuring YoungBloodZ)	2004	40	14	Complicated
"—" denotes a recording that did not chart or was not released in that territory.

== Guest appearances ==
- 1998: "Jazzy Hoes" Jermaine Dupri featuring YoungBloodZ, 8Ball, Mr. Black & Too Short
- 2000: "Jumpin Down On Em" Baby D featung YoungBloodZ, Loko & Dollar
- 2001: "I'm Serious (Remix)" T.I. featuring Pastor Troy, YoungBloodZ & Lil' Jon
- 2001: "Know What's Up" Blaque featuring YoungBloodZ
- 2004: "I Smoke, I Drank (Remix)" Body Head Bangerz featuring YoungBloodZ
- 2004: "Okay" Nivea featuring Lil Jon & YoungBloodZ
- 2004: "Jook Gal (Head Gawn Remix)" Elephant Man featuring YoungBloodZ, Twista & Kiprich
- 2005: "It's Whateva Wit Us" Three 6 Mafia featuring Ying Yang Twins & YoungBloodZ
- 2005: "I'm Sprung 2" T-Pain featuring Trick Daddy & YoungBloodZ
- 2005: "Me And My Brother (Remix)" Ying Yang Twins featuring YoungBloodZ
- 2005: "Addicted to Pimpin" Too Short featuring YoungBloodZ
- 2005: "I Don't Care" Young Rome featuring YoungBloodZ
- 2007: "Real Head Bussa" Teflon feat. YoungBloodZ
- 2007: "U Already Know (A-Town Remix)" 112 featuring YoungBloodZ
- 2010: "Attitude" EDIDON featuring YoungBloodZ, Stormey Coleman & Young Noble of Outlawz
