= Billboard Year-End Hot R&B/Hip-Hop Singles & Tracks of 2003 =

American music chart

This is a list of Billboard magazine's Top Hot R&B/Hip-Hop Singles & Tracks of 2003.

No.	Title	Artist(s)
1	"In da Club"	50 Cent
2	"Ignition"	R. Kelly
3	"Miss You"	Aaliyah
4	"So Gone"	Monica
5	"Get Low"	Lil Jon & the East Side Boyz featuring Ying Yang Twins
6	"Right Thurr"	Chingy
7	"21 Questions"	50 Cent
8	"Get Busy"	Sean Paul
9	"How You Gonna Act Like That"	Tyrese
10	"Frontin'"	Pharrell Williams featuring Jay-Z
11	"Can't Let You Go"	Fabolous featuring Mike Shorey and Lil' Mo
12	"P.I.M.P."	50 Cent
13	"I Know What You Want"	Busta Rhymes and Mariah Carey featuring Flipmode Squad
14	"Crazy in Love"	Beyoncé featuring Jay-Z
15	"Beautiful"	Snoop Dogg featuring Pharrell and Uncle Charlie Wilson
16	"Baby Boy"	Beyoncé featuring Sean Paul
17	"Put That Woman First"	Jaheim
18	"Magic Stick"	Lil' Kim featuring 50 Cent
19	"Love of My Life (An Ode to Hip-Hop)"	Erykah Badu featuring Common
20	"Damn!"	YoungBloodZ featuring Lil Jon
21	"In Those Jeans"	Ginuwine
22	"Come Over"	Aaliyah
23	"Excuse Me Miss"	Jay-Z
24	"Into You"	Fabolous featuring Tamia
25	"Step in the Name of Love"	R. Kelly
26	"Stand Up"	Ludacris featuring Shawnna
27	"Say Yes"	Floetry
28	"Shake Ya Tailfeather"	Nelly, P. Diddy and Murphy Lee
29	"Thoia Thoing"	R. Kelly
30	"Dontchange"	Musiq
31	"I Wish I Wasn't"	Heather Headley
32	"Rain on Me"	Ashanti
33	"Fabulous"	Jaheim featuring Tha' Rayne
34	"Wanksta"	50 Cent
35	"Rock wit U (Awww Baby)"	Ashanti
36	"The Jump Off"	Lil' Kim featuring Mr. Cheeks
37	"Work It"	Missy Elliott
38	"I Can"	Nas
39	"Air Force Ones"	Nelly featuring Kyjuan, Ali and Murphy Lee
40	"No Letting Go"	Wayne Wonder
41	"Bump, Bump, Bump"	B2K featuring P. Diddy
42	"All I Have"	Jennifer Lopez featuring LL Cool J
43	"Never Scared"	Bone Crusher featuring Killer Mike and T.I.
44	"Gossip Folks"	Missy Elliott featuring Ludacris
45	"Can't Stop, Won't Stop"	Young Gunz
46	"Emotional Rollercoaster"	Vivian Green
47	"Never Leave You (Uh Oooh, Uh Oooh)"	Lumidee
48	"Walked Outta Heaven"	Jagged Edge
49	"Mesmerize"	Ja Rule featuring Ashanti
50	"What Would You Do?"	The Isley Brothers featuring R. Kelly
51	"I Should Be..."	Dru Hill
52	"Like Glue"	Sean Paul
53	"Thugz Mansion"	2Pac
54	"Like a Pimp"	David Banner featuring Lil Flip
55	"4Ever"	Lil' Mo featuring Fabolous
56	"Sick of Being Lonely"	Field Mob
57	"Snake"	R. Kelly featuring Big Tigger
58	"Holidae In"	Chingy featuring Ludacris and Snoop Dogg
59	"'03 Bonnie & Clyde"	Jay-Z featuring Beyoncé Knowles
60	"Pump It Up"	Joe Budden
61	"Let's Get Down"	Bow Wow featuring Baby
62	"Make It Clap"	Busta Rhymes featuring Sean Paul and Spliff Star
63	"The Way You Move"	Outkast featuring Sleepy Brown
64	"Clubbin'"	Marques Houston featuring Joe Budden and R. Kelly
65	"I'll Never Leave"	R. Kelly
66	"Signs of Love Makin'"	Tyrese
67	"Made You Look"	Nas
68	"Love Calls"	Kem
69	"Love @ 1st Sight"	Mary J. Blige featuring Method Man
70	"Luv U Better"	LL Cool J
71	"Lose Yourself"	Eminem
72	"Superstar"	Ruben Studdard
73	"Gimme the Light"	Sean Paul
74	"Dance with My Father"	Luther Vandross
75	"Cry Me a River"	Justin Timberlake
76	"I Care 4 U"	Aaliyah
77	"Read Your Mind"	Avant
78	"Hell Yeah"	Ginuwine featuring Baby
79	"What Happened to That Boy"	Baby featuring Clipse
80	"Guess What"	Syleena Johnson
81	"Paradise"	LL Cool J featuring Amerie
82	"Ooh!"	Mary J. Blige
83	"Girlfriend"	B2K
84	"Come Close"	Common featuring Mary J. Blige
85	"Do That..."	Baby featuring P. Diddy
86	"Satisfaction"	Eve
87	"Officially Missing You"	Tamia
88	"My Love Is Like...Wo"	Mya
89	"Realest Niggas"	50 Cent and The Notorious B.I.G.
90	"Act a Fool"	Ludacris
91	"When the Last Time"	Clipse
92	"Laundromat"	Nivea
93	"If I Can't"	50 Cent
94	"I Love You"	Dru Hill
95	"24's"	T.I.
96	"Wat Da Hook Gon Be"	Murphy Lee featuring Jermaine Dupri
97	"What Up Gangsta"	50 Cent
98	"Beware of the Boys (Mundian To Bach Ke)"	Panjabi MC featuring Jay-Z
99	"One of Those Days"	Whitney Houston
100	"Still Ballin'"	2Pac featuring Trick Daddy

== See also ==
- 2003 in music
- Billboard Year-End Hot 100 singles of 2003
- Billboard Year-End Hot Rap Singles of 2003
- List of Hot R&B/Hip-Hop Singles & Tracks number ones of 2003
