= Billboard Year-End Hot 100 singles of 2003 =

Ranking of recorded music

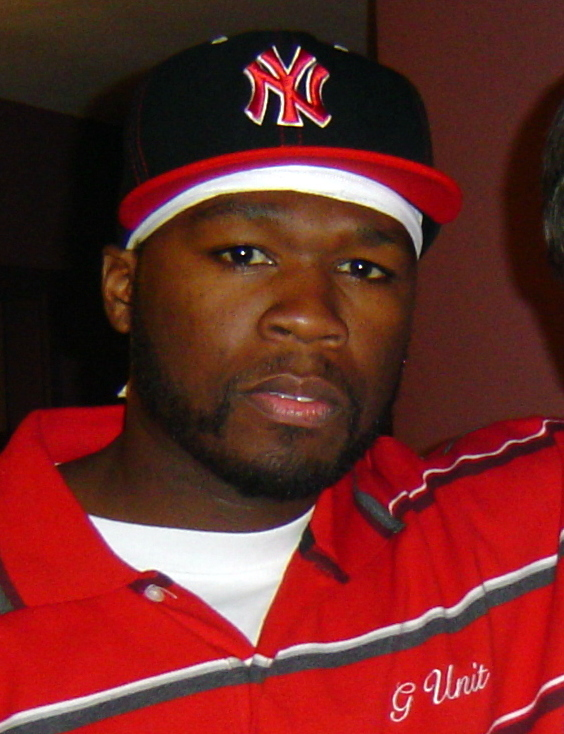
50 Cent's (pictured in 2006) "In da Club" took the top spot, one of four singles from his debut studio album Get Rich or Die Tryin' to make the list (at positions 14, 21, and 63). He was also featured on Lil' Kim's "Magic Stick", ranked 20.

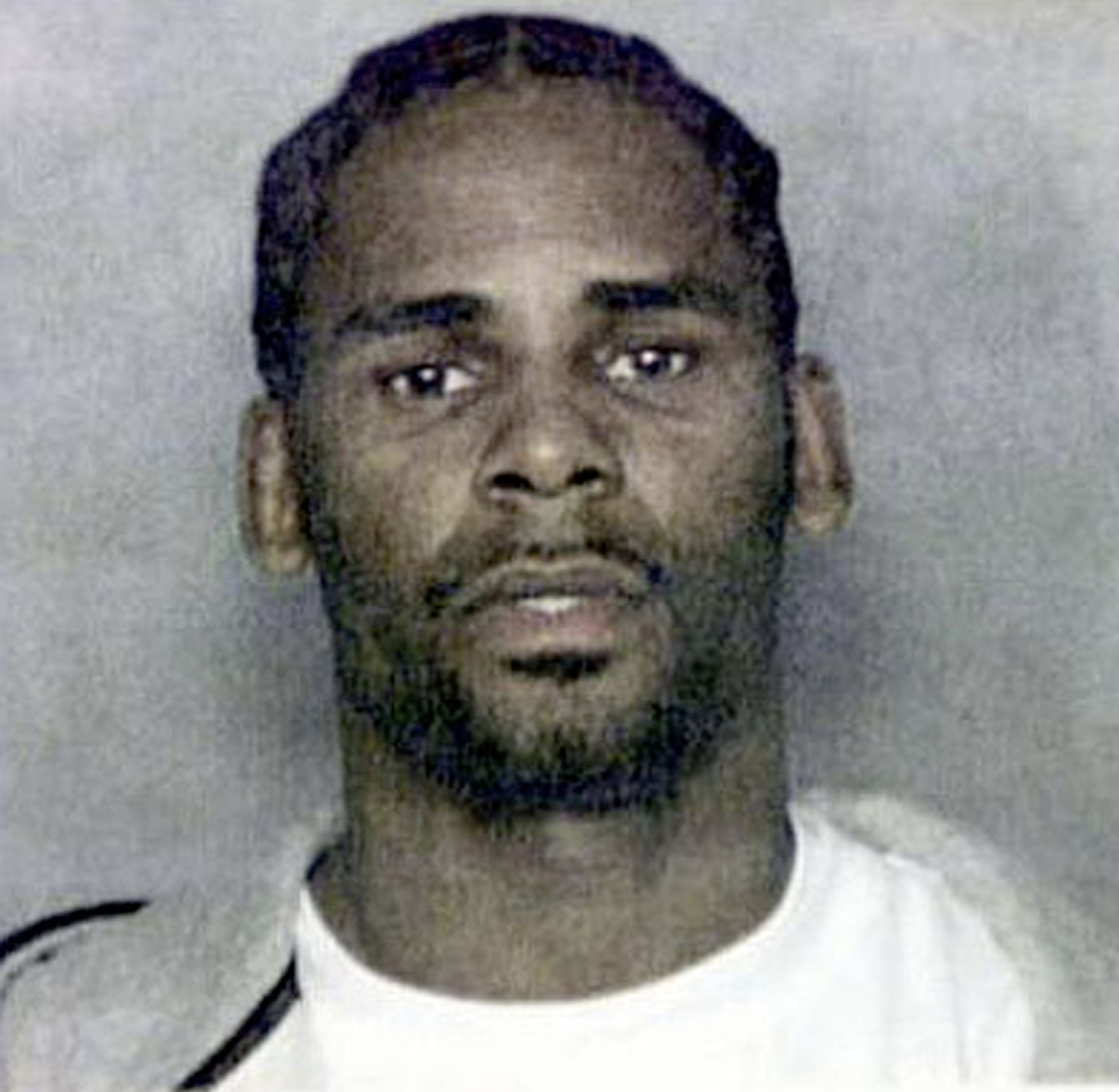
R. Kelly had the number-two song of 2003 ("Ignition (Remix)") as well as two other songs on the year-end chart ("Thoia Thoing" at number 61 and "Step in the Name of Love" at number 94.)

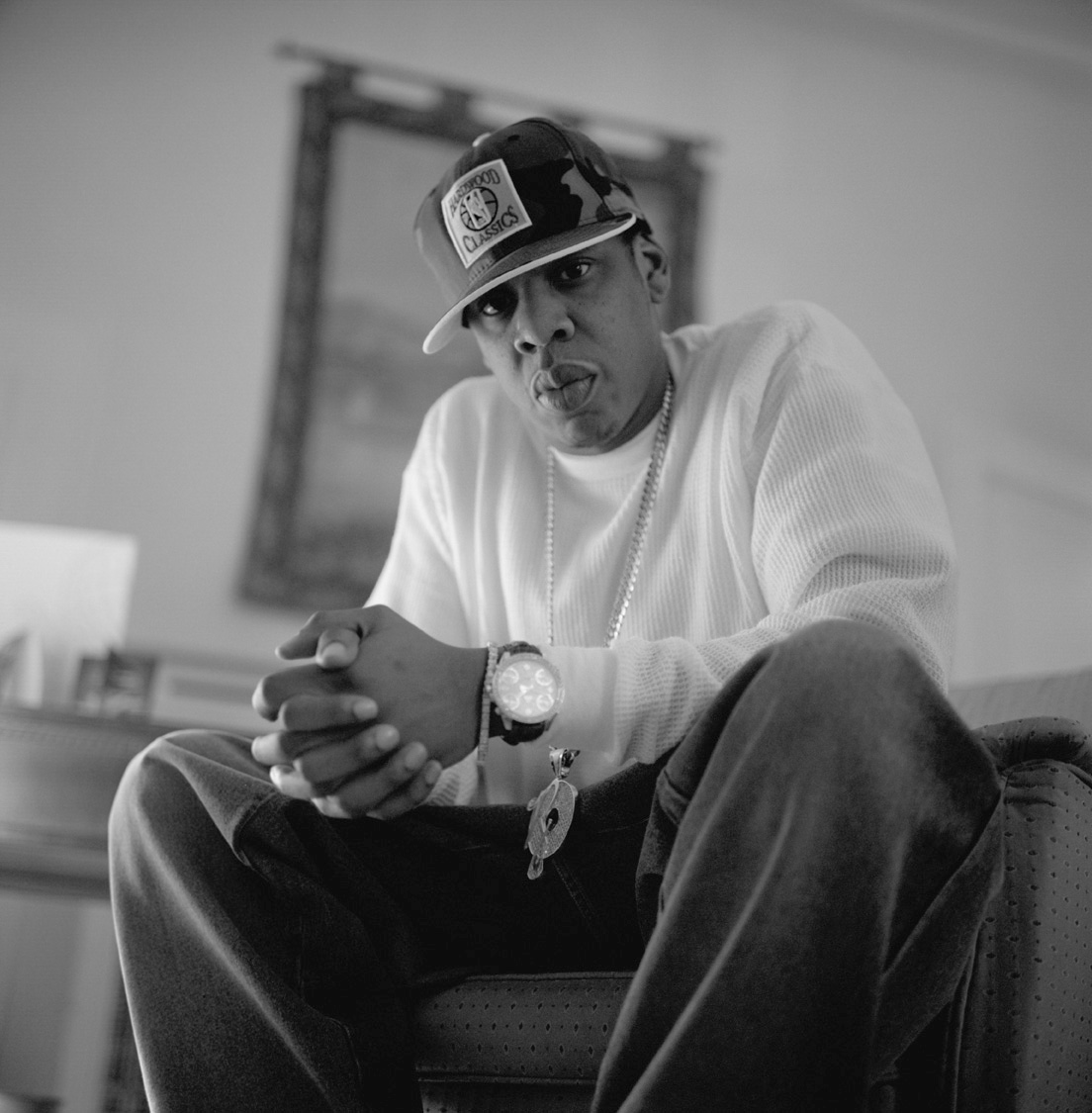
Two of Jay-Z's songs as a lead artist, "'03 Bonnie & Clyde" and "Excuse Me Miss", appeared at numbers 37 and 54 on 2003's year-end chart. He was also featured on "Crazy in Love" (number four) and "Frontin'" (number 34).

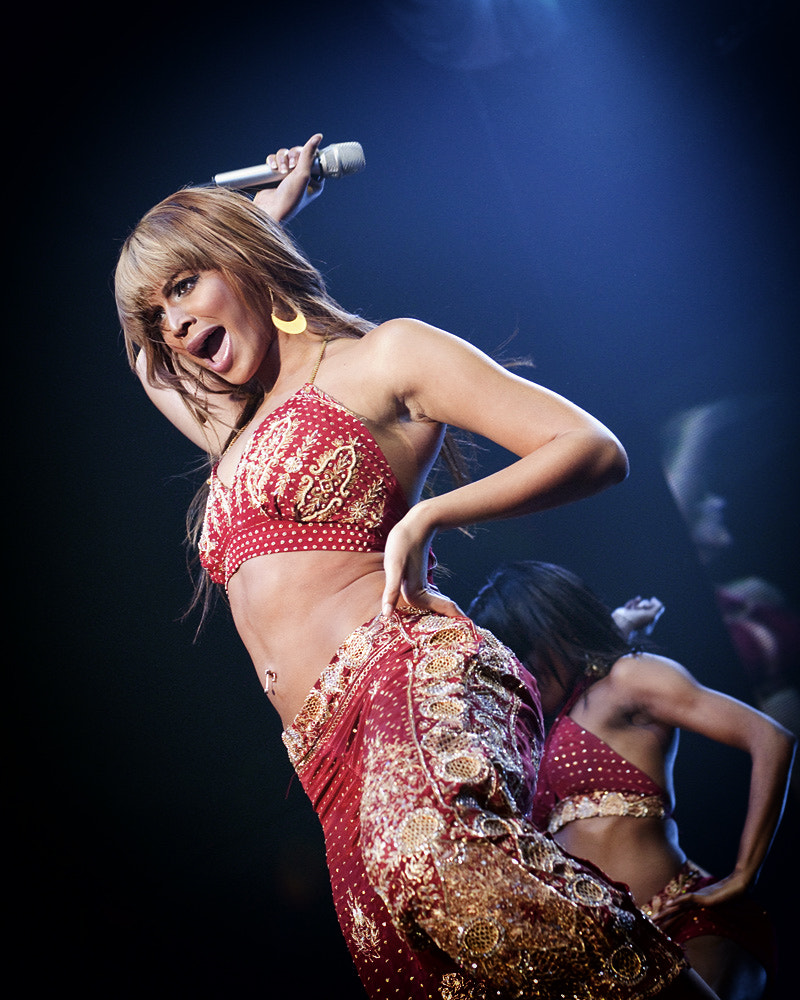
Beyoncé had two songs in the top-15 of the year-end chart for 2003: "Crazy in Love" at number four and "Baby Boy" at number 12. She was also featured on Jay-Z's song "'03 Bonnie & Clyde", which appeared at number 37.

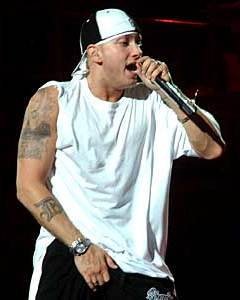
Eminem had three songs on 2003's Year-End Hot 100: "Lose Yourself" at number 28, "Sing for the Moment" at number 89, and "Superman" at number 98.

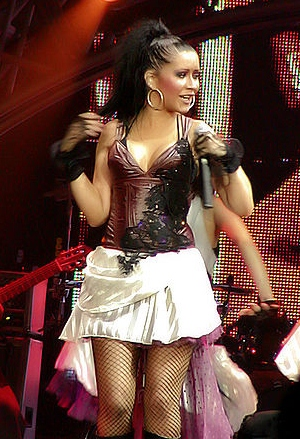
Christina Aguilera's songs "Beautiful", "Can't Hold Us Down", and "Fighter" all charted on 2003's year-end chart.

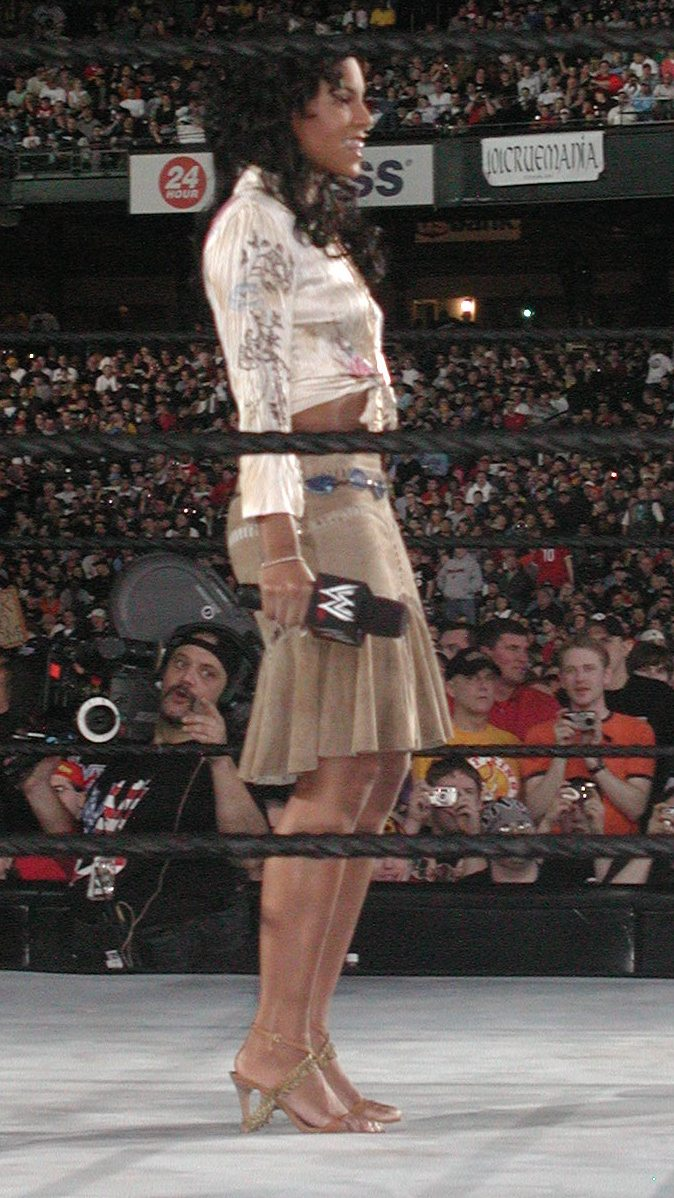
Ashanti's songs "Rock wit U (Awww Baby)" (number 29) and "Rain on Me" (number 83) both appeared on 2003's Year-End Hot 100. She was also featured on Fabolous’ song Into You, which was notable for having two versions being credited on the charts at the same time, and on Ja Rule's song "Mesmerize", which charted at number 25.

This is a list of Billboard magazine's Top Hot 100 songs of 2003.

The list is also notable for only three songs appearing in the list from 2002. In contrast, as many as nine also appeared in the list from 2004.

No.	Title	Artist(s)
1	"In da Club"	50 Cent
2	"Ignition (Remix)"	R. Kelly
3	"Get Busy"	Sean Paul
4	"Crazy in Love"	Beyoncé featuring Jay-Z
5	"When I'm Gone"	3 Doors Down
6	"Unwell"	Matchbox Twenty
7	"Right Thurr"	Chingy
8	"Miss You"	Aaliyah
9	"Picture"	Kid Rock featuring Sheryl Crow or Allison Moorer
10	"Bring Me to Life"	Evanescence featuring Paul McCoy
11	"Get Low"	Lil Jon & The East Side Boyz featuring Ying Yang Twins
12	"Baby Boy"	Beyoncé featuring Sean Paul
13	"Shake Ya Tailfeather"	Nelly, P. Diddy and Murphy Lee
14	"21 Questions"	50 Cent featuring Nate Dogg
15	"All I Have"	Jennifer Lopez featuring LL Cool J
16	"Beautiful"	Christina Aguilera
17	"I Know What You Want"	Busta Rhymes and Mariah Carey featuring Flipmode Squad
18	"I'm with You"	Avril Lavigne
19	"Drift Away"	Uncle Kracker featuring Dobie Gray
20	"Magic Stick"	Lil' Kim featuring 50 Cent
21	"P.I.M.P."	50 Cent
22	"Bump, Bump, Bump"	B2K and P. Diddy
23	"Into You"	Fabolous featuring Tamia or Ashanti
24	"Can't Let You Go"	Fabolous featuring Lil' Mo and Mike Shorey
25	"Mesmerize"	Ja Rule featuring Ashanti
26	"Where Is the Love?"	Black Eyed Peas
27	"The Game of Love"	Santana featuring Michelle Branch
28	"Lose Yourself"	Eminem
29	"Rock wit U (Awww Baby)"	Ashanti
30	"Cry Me a River"	Justin Timberlake
31	"How You Gonna Act Like That"	Tyrese
32	"Rock Your Body"	Justin Timberlake
33	"No Letting Go"	Wayne Wonder
34	"Frontin'"	Pharrell featuring Jay-Z
35	"Landslide"	Dixie Chicks
36	"Work It"	Missy Elliott
37	"'03 Bonnie & Clyde"	Jay-Z featuring Beyoncé
38	"Don't Mess with My Man"	Nivea featuring Jagged Edge
39	"So Gone"	Monica
40	"Air Force Ones"	Nelly featuring Murphy Lee, Ali, and Kyjuan
41	"Never Leave You (Uh Oooh, Uh Oooh)"	Lumidee
42	"Beautiful"	Snoop Dogg featuring Pharrell and Charlie Wilson
43	"Gossip Folks"	Missy Elliott featuring Ludacris
44	"Miss Independent"	Kelly Clarkson
45	"Calling All Angels"	Train
46	"Damn!"	YoungBloodZ featuring Lil Jon
47	"This Is the Night"	Clay Aiken
48	"Your Body Is a Wonderland"	John Mayer
49	"Headstrong"	Trapt
50	"In Those Jeans"	Ginuwine
51	"Stand Up"	Ludacris featuring Shawnna
52	"The Remedy (I Won't Worry)"	Jason Mraz
53	"Why Don't You & I"	Santana featuring Alex Band
54	"Excuse Me Miss"	Jay-Z
55	"Jenny from the Block"	Jennifer Lopez featuring Jadakiss and Styles P
56	"Are You Happy Now?"	Michelle Branch
57	"Forever and for Always"	Shania Twain
58	"I Can"	Nas
59	"Underneath It All"	No Doubt featuring Lady Saw
60	"If You're Not the One"	Daniel Bedingfield
61	"Thoia Thoing"	R. Kelly
62	"Here Without You"	3 Doors Down
63	"Wanksta"	50 Cent
64	"My Love Is Like...Wo"	Mýa
65	"It's Five O'Clock Somewhere"	Alan Jackson featuring Jimmy Buffett
66	"Like Glue"	Sean Paul
67	"Can't Hold Us Down"	Christina Aguilera featuring Lil' Kim
68	"My Front Porch Looking In"	Lonestar
69	"Angel"	Amanda Perez
70	"She Hates Me"	Puddle of Mudd
71	"Don't Wanna Try"	Frankie J
72	"The Jump Off"	Lil' Kim featuring Mr. Cheeks
73	"Intuition"	Jewel
74	"Hell Yeah"	Ginuwine featuring Baby
75	"Beer for My Horses"	Toby Keith featuring Willie Nelson
76	"Holidae In"	Chingy featuring Ludacris and Snoop Dogg
77	"Suga Suga"	Baby Bash featuring Frankie J
78	"Love of My Life (An Ode to Hip-Hop)"	Erykah Badu featuring Common
79	"Fighter"	Christina Aguilera
80	"Thugz Mansion"	2Pac
81	"Clocks"	Coldplay
82	"Put That Woman First"	Jaheim
83	"Rain on Me"	Ashanti
84	"19 Somethin'"	Mark Wills
85	"Can't Stop, Won't Stop"	Young Gunz
86	"Red Dirt Road"	Brooks & Dunn
87	"What Was I Thinkin'"	Dierks Bentley
88	"Flying Without Wings"	Ruben Studdard
89	"Sing for the Moment"	Eminem
90	"Have You Forgotten?"	Darryl Worley
91	"No Shoes, No Shirt, No Problems"	Kenny Chesney
92	"Come Over"	Aaliyah
93	"Sick of Being Lonely"	Field Mob
94	"Step in the Name of Love"	R. Kelly
95	"I Want You"	Thalía featuring Fat Joe
96	"Like a Stone"	Audioslave
97	"Don't Know Why"	Norah Jones
98	"Superman"	Eminem
99	"Real Good Man"	Tim McGraw
100	"Say Yes"	Floetry

== See also ==
- 2003 in music
- Billboard Year-End Hot R&B/Hip-Hop Singles & Tracks of 2003
- Billboard Year-End Hot Rap Tracks of 2003
- List of Billboard Hot 100 number-one singles of 2003
- List of Billboard Hot 100 top-ten singles in 2003
