= Bad Influence =

Bad Influence may refer to:

== Film and television ==
- Bad Influence (1990 film), an American film by Curtis Hanson
- Bad Influence (2025 film), a Spanish romantic drama film
- Bad Influence!, a 1992–1996 British children's TV series covering computers and video games
- "Bad Influence" (21 Jump Street), a 1987 episode
- "Bad Influence" (The Weird Al Show), a 1997 episode

== Music ==
=== Albums ===
- Bad Influence (album), a 1983 album by Robert Cray, or the title song
- The Bad Influence, by Lil Wyte, 2009
- Bad Influence, by La Chat, 2006
- Bad Influence, by YoungBloodZ, unreleased (2008)

=== Songs ===
- "Bad Influence" (song), by Pink, 2009
- "Bad Influence", by the B-52s from Good Stuff, 1992
- "Bad Influence", by Clutchy Hopkins and Shawn Lee from Clutch of the Tiger, 2008
- "Bad Influence", by Eminem from the End of Days film soundtrack, 1999
- "Bad Influence", by Omah Lay, 2020
- "Bad Influence", by Seventeen from Happy Burstday, 2025

== Other uses ==
- Bad Influence (professional wrestling), a tag team consisting of Christopher Daniels and Frankie Kazarian
- Bad Influence, a 2004 novel by William Sutcliffe

== See also ==
- Influence (disambiguation)
