= P.A. (group) =

American Southern hip-hop trio

P.A. (Parental Advisory)
- Origin: College Park, Georgia, U.S.
- Genre: Hip-hop
- Years active: 1991–2000
- Labels: Savvy; MCA; DreamWorks
- Members: Mello; KP; Big Reese

P.A. (short for Parental Advisory) was an American Southern hip-hop trio, part of the Atlanta-based musical collective Dungeon Family and composed of rappers James "Mello" Hollins, Kawan "K.P." Prather, and DJ Maurice "Big Reese" Sinclair.

They were discovered by American singer Pebbles, and became the first act from Dungeon Family to sign a major label recording contract, with her label Savvy Records. The label only released their debut studio album, Ghetto Street Funk (1993) and they signed with DreamWorks Records to release their second album, Straight No Chase (1998). The latter spawned the single "Like We Do", which entered the Hot R&B/Hip-Hop Songs chart. Another single from the album, "Reservations" was included on the soundtrack for the 1998 film Blade. The trio's third album, My Life, Your Entertainment (2000), was also released by DreamWorks and served as their final release.

== Discography ==
=== Studio albums ===
Title	Release	Peak chart positions	
Title	Release	US R&B	US Heat.
Ghetto Street Funk	Released: 1993; Label: MCA Records/Savvy Records	—	—
Straight No Chase	Released: July 14, 1998; Label: DreamWorks Records	90	—
My Life, Your Entertainment	Released: August 1, 2000; Label: DreamWorks Records	51	13

=== Singles ===
Title	Release	Peak chart positions		Album
Title	Release	US R&B	US Rap	Album
"Maniac"	1993	—	—	Ghetto Street Funk
"Ghetto Head Hunta"	1994	—	—	Ghetto Street Funk
"Like We Do"	1998	69	23	Straight No Chase
"Reservations"	1998	—	—	Blade (soundtrack)
"Sundown" (with 8ball)	2000	—	—	My Life, Your Entertainment

=== Production ===
- YoungBloodZ: "85 / Billy Dee Interlude", "It's the Money / Fake ID Interlude", "Booty Club Playa" from Against da Grain (1999)
- Mystikal: "Come See About Me" from Let's Get Ready (2000)
- T.I. & Beanie Sigel: "2 Glock 9's" from Music from and Inspired by Shaft (2000)
- Pink: "Do What U Do" from Can't Take Me Home (2000)
- Rehab: "Escape Intro", "Storm Chaser", "Rattle My Cage" from Southern Discomfort (2000)
