= My Life, Your Entertainment =

Studio album by Parental Advisory
- Released: August 1, 2000 (US)
- Recorded: 1998–1999
- Genre: Southern hip hop
- Length: 49:52
- Label: DreamWorks
- Producer: P.A. (also exec.); Craig Love; Organized Noize

Parental Advisory chronology
Straight No Chase (1998)	My Life, Your Entertainment (2000)

Professional ratings
Review scores
Source	Rating
AllMusic	4.5/5 stars
RapReviews	8.5/10
Rolling Stone	2.5/5 stars
Vibe	4/5 stars

My Life, Your Entertainment is the third and final studio album by P.A., released in 2000. Jim Crow, T.I., 8Ball, Goodie Mob, N.O.R.E., Pimp C, and YoungBloodZ make guest appearances on the album.

== Production ==
The album was produced by P.A., Organized Noize, and Craig Love.

== Critical reception ==
The Pitch wrote that the group "blasts dynamic street rhymes over guitar-laced tracks that would have both Jimi Hendrix and Iceberg Slim smilin’ ... the combination of heavy-metal riffs and seductive pimp-licious grooves created a unique, richly textured sound." Rolling Stone wrote that P.A. "import shades of New York's ride-or-die anthems and old West Coast G-Funk into their crunk landscapes." The New Pittsburgh Courier thought that the album "takes P.A.'s funkadelic hip-hop to a new level with grimy ghetto rhymes, syrupy rock guitars and ham-hock-thick beats."

== Track listing ==
1. Hello (Intro)
2. My Life, Yo Entertainment
3. U Got We Got
4. They Come Thru (featuring Jim Crow)
5. Just Like That
6. Down Flat (featuring T.I.)
7. Sundown (featuring 8Ball)
8. Handcuffin' (Interlude)
9. Playaz Do
10. Problems (featuring Khujo)
11. Entertainment (Interlude)
12. What Was It Fo?
13. Dope Stories [Remix] (featuring Big Gipp, Noreaga and Pimp C)
14. Somethin' 2 Ride (featuring YoungBloodZ)
15. My Time 2 Go (featuring Cee-Lo Green)
