= List of Hot R&B/Hip-Hop Singles & Tracks number ones of 2003 =

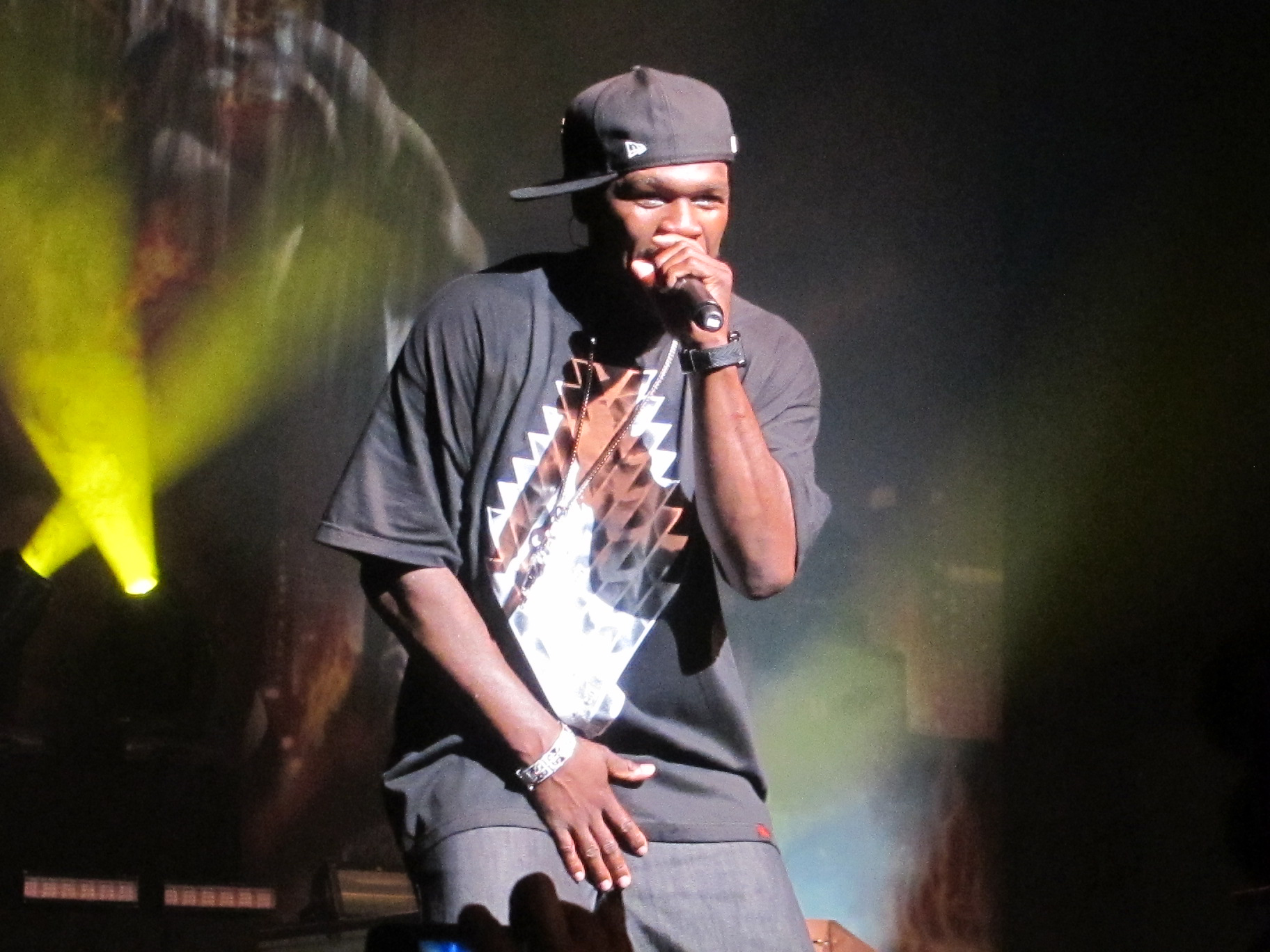
Rapper 50 Cent had two long-running number ones in 2003.

Hot R&B/Hip-Hop Songs is a chart that ranks the top-performing R&B and hip hop music in the United States, published by Billboard magazine. In 2003, 13 different songs topped the chart in 51 issues of the magazine, based on weekly airplay data from R&B and hip hop music radio stations compiled by Nielsen Broadcast Data Systems.

== Chart history ==
Key
†	Indicates best-charting R&B single of 2003

Issue date	Title	Artist(s)	Ref.
January 4	"Love of My Life (An Ode to Hip-Hop)"	Erykah Badu featuring Common	
January 11	"Love of My Life (An Ode to Hip-Hop)"	Erykah Badu featuring Common	
January 18	"Love of My Life (An Ode to Hip-Hop)"	Erykah Badu featuring Common	
January 25	"Miss You"	Aaliyah	
February 1	"Miss You"	Aaliyah	
February 8	"Miss You"	Aaliyah	
February 15	"In da Club" †	50 Cent	
February 22	"In da Club" †	50 Cent	
March 1	"In da Club" †	50 Cent	
March 8	"In da Club" †	50 Cent	
March 15	"In da Club" †	50 Cent	
March 22	"In da Club" †	50 Cent	
March 29	"In da Club" †	50 Cent	
April 12	"In da Club" †	50 Cent	
April 19	"Excuse Me Miss"	Jay-Z	
April 26	"Get Busy"	Sean Paul	
May 3	"21 Questions"	50 Cent featuring Nate Dogg	
May 10	"21 Questions"	50 Cent featuring Nate Dogg	
May 17	"21 Questions"	50 Cent featuring Nate Dogg	
May 24	"21 Questions"	50 Cent featuring Nate Dogg	
May 31	"21 Questions"	50 Cent featuring Nate Dogg	
June 7	"21 Questions"	50 Cent featuring Nate Dogg	
June 14	"21 Questions"	50 Cent featuring Nate Dogg	
June 21	"So Gone"	Monica	
June 28	"So Gone"	Monica	
July 5	"So Gone"	Monica	
July 12	"So Gone"	Monica	
July 19	"So Gone"	Monica	
July 26	"Crazy in Love"	Beyoncé featuring Jay-Z	
August 2	"Crazy in Love"	Beyoncé featuring Jay-Z	
August 9	"Crazy in Love"	Beyoncé featuring Jay-Z	
August 16	"Frontin'"	Pharrell featuring Jay-Z	
August 23	"Frontin'"	Pharrell featuring Jay-Z	
August 30	"Frontin'"	Pharrell featuring Jay-Z	
September 6	"Frontin'"	Pharrell featuring Jay-Z	
September 13	"Frontin'"	Pharrell featuring Jay-Z	
September 20	"Frontin'"	Pharrell featuring Jay-Z	
September 27	"Baby Boy"	Beyoncé featuring Sean Paul	
October 4	"Baby Boy"	Beyoncé featuring Sean Paul	
October 11	"Baby Boy"	Beyoncé featuring Sean Paul	
October 18	"Baby Boy"	Beyoncé featuring Sean Paul	
October 25	"Baby Boy"	Beyoncé featuring Sean Paul	
November 1	"Stand Up"	Ludacris featuring Shawnna	
November 8	"Stand Up"	Ludacris featuring Shawnna	
November 15	"Stand Up"	Ludacris featuring Shawnna	
November 22	"Stand Up"	Ludacris featuring Shawnna	
November 29	"Stand Up"	Ludacris featuring Shawnna	
December 6	"Step in the Name of Love"	R. Kelly	
December 13	"Step in the Name of Love"	R. Kelly	
December 20	"You Don't Know My Name"	Alicia Keys	
December 27	"You Don't Know My Name"	Alicia Keys	

== See also ==
- 2003 in music
- Billboard Year-End Hot R&B/Hip-Hop Singles & Tracks of 2003
- List of number-one R&B hits (United States)
