= Still Grippin' tha Grain: The Best Of =

Greatest hits album by YoungBloodZ
- Released: November 21, 2006
- Recorded: 1999–2005
- Genres: Hip-hop, crunk, Southern hip-hop
- Length: 55:35
- Label: La Face

YoungBloodZ chronology
Ev'rybody Know Me (2005)	Still Grippin' tha Grain: The Best Of (2006)

Still Grippin' tha Grain: The Best Of is the "best-of" album by Southern rap duo YoungBloodZ. It was released in 2006.

== Track listing ==
1. "YoungBloodZ Intro/6P's" (interlude)
2. "Presidential"
3. "Cadillac Pimpin'"
4. "Damn!" (featuring Lil Jon)
5. "Mind on My Money" (featuring Jazze Pha)
6. "85/Billy Dee" (Interlude) (featuring Big Boi)
7. "Shakem' Off"
8. "Chop Chop"
9. "U-Way" (How We Do It)
10. "Datz Me" (featuring Young Buck)
11. "Tequila"
12. "Hustle" (featuring Killer Mike)
13. "Lean Low" (featuring Backbone)
14. "Ev'rbody Know Me" (bonus track)
