= Ghetto Street Funk =

Studio album by Parental Advisory
- Released: 1993
- Recorded: 1992–1993
- Studio: Bosstown (Atlanta, GA); Studio LaCoCo (Atlanta, GA); Doppler (Atlanta, GA)
- Genre: Hip hop
- Length: 44:49
- Label: Savvy; MCA
- Producer: DJ Toomp; Organized Noize; P.A.

Parental Advisory chronology
Ghetto Street Funk (1993)	Straight No Chase (1998)

Singles from Ghetto Street Funk
- 1. "Maniac" Released: 1993; 2. "Ghetto Head Hunta" Released: 1994

Professional ratings
Review scores
Source	Rating
AllMusic	3/5 stars

Ghetto Street Funk is the debut studio album by American hip hop trio Parental Advisory. It was released on November 9, 1993, via MCA Records. The recording sessions took place at Bosstown Recording Studios, Studio LaCoCo, and Doppler Studios, in Atlanta. The album was produced by Organized Noize, DJ Toomp, and P.A., with Pebbles serving as executive producer. The album spawned two singles: "Maniac" and "Ghetto Head Hunta". It is also contains a remix of the song "Lifeline", which originally appeared on CB4 (Original Motion Picture Soundtrack).

== Track listing ==
1. "Strictly Butcher" - 3:34
2. "Da Boom" - 4:34
3. "Lifeline" (Remix) - 4:39
4. "Bullshit" - 0:22
5. "Maniac" - 4:17
6. "BB" - 4:33
7. "Sex in da Morning" - 2:50
8. "Ghetto Break" (Interlude) - 5:30
9. "Ghetto Head Hunta" - 3:28
10. "Let Loose the Lingo" - 4:12
11. "Manifest" - 4:08
12. "Milk" - 3:14
13. "Reyes Not Fall" - 3:58
14. "Da End" - 0:21
