= Hood Anthems =

2007 studio album by Sean P

Studio album by Sean P
- Released: May 2007
- Recorded: 2006–2007
- Genre: Hip hop, Southern hip hop
- Label: Ball or Fall

Sean P chronology
Hood Anthems (2007)	Very Necessary (2008)

Hood Anthems is the debut solo studio album by American rapper Sean P of Atlanta-based hip hop duo YoungBloodZ. This album features the likes of Trae, Lloyd and Goodie Mob's Khujo Goodie. It contains a bonus disc featuring songs by other Ball or Fall Records artists like Da Fam Gang, Numskull and fellow Youngbloodz member J-Bo.

== Track listing ==
1. "Intro"
2. "Ballin Baby" (featuring Prince Bugsy and Kashflow)
3. "I'm Hood" (featuring Kashflow)
4. "Icy White Tees" (featuring Prince Bugsy and Taliban Bundy)
5. "Rockstar" (featuring Kashflow and Numskull)
6. "That's Fo Sho" (featuring Young Fell and Eddi Projex)
7. "Soldier'D Up" (featuring Prince Bugsy)
8. "Like This" (featuring Kujo Goodie and Trae)
9. "If You Got A Problem"
10. "They Aint Shit" (featuring Lloyd)
11. "I Like What I See"
12. "Do My Thang"
13. "Going Hard"
  - Performed by J-Bo
14. "Get Dat Money Hoe"
  - Performed by Da Fam Gang
15. "40's In A Brown Bag"
  - Performed by Numskull
16. "Fam Gang Musik"
  - Performed by Taliban Bundy
17. "Sick Wid It"
  - Performed by Prince Bugsy
