= Bacao Rhythm & Steel Band =

German funk music ensemble

- Origin: Hamburg, Germany
- Genres: funk steelpan
- Years active: 2007–present
- Label: Big Crown Records
- Members: Ben Greenslade-Stanton, Björn Wagner

Bacao Rhythm & Steel Band is a German funk music ensemble founded by members of the Mighty Mocambos.

== History ==
Bandleader Björn Wagner played in funk group The Mighty Mocambos and lived in Trinidad and Tobago for a time, where he studied steel drums and had one custom made. The group released its first 7-inch single, consisting of two covers of songs by The Meters, in 2007. Shortly after this they followed up with another 7-inch single, a cover of the 50 Cent hit "P.I.M.P.". Several more 7-inch records were released in the mid-2010s. Some of these singles were collected on the group's first full-length, 55, which was released by the Brooklyn label Big Crown in 2016. The album included several new originals as well as the cover of "P.I.M.P." and covers of John Holt's "Police in Helicopter", Dennis Coffey's "Scorpio", Faith Evans's "Love Like This", and Cat Stevens's "Was Dog a Doughnut".

== Discography ==
Albums

- 55 (Big Crown, 2016-03-18)
- The Serpent's Mouth (Big Crown, 2018-09-14)
- Expansions (Big Crown, 2021-07-16)
- BSRB (Big Crown, 2024-03-08)

Singles

- "Look-Ka-Py-Py"/"Ease Back" (Mocambo, 2007)
- "PIMP" (Mocambo, 2008)
- "Bacao Suave" (Plane Jane, 2014)
- "Jungle Fever" (Plane Jane, 2015)
- "Love Like This" (Big Crown, 2016)
- "Scorpio"/"8th Wonder" (Big Crown, 2016)

== In popular culture and media ==
The single "PIMP" was used as a plot device in the 2023 film Anatomy of a Fall.

The single "Laventille Road March" was used in the fifth episode of season five ("Namaste") of the American crime drama Better Call Saul.
