= Straight No Chase =

Studio album by Parental Advisory
- Released: July 14, 1998 (US)
- Studio: PatchWerk Recording Studios (Atlanta, GA); Doppler Studios (Atlanta, GA)
- Genre: Southern hip hop
- Length: 48:57
- Label: DreamWorks
- Producer: P.A.

Parental Advisory chronology
Ghetto Street Funk (1993)	Straight No Chase (1998)	My Life, Your Entertainment (2000)

Professional ratings
Review scores
Source	Rating
AllMusic	4/5 stars
The Atlanta Constitution	B
The Source	3.5/5 stars

Straight No Chase is the second studio album by the Dungeon Family associates P.A., released July 14, 1998 via DreamWorks Records.

The album peaked at No. 90 on Billboard's Top R&B Albums chart.

== Critical reception ==
The Record wrote that the album "incorporates live instrumentation and pure singing as a natural outgrowth of the compositions, rather than a gimmick or gesture." The Atlanta Constitution thought that "spaghetti guitars, soul and rock propel this sample-free and cinematic sophomore effort."

AllMusic called Straight No Chase "a brilliantly funky, unpredictable record that veers between street hip-hop, soul, rock and funk."

== Track listing ==
1. Resurrection
2. Like We Do
3. China White
4. Crime Don't Pay
5. Ecstasy
6. Po Hustlin'
7. Dope Stories
8. Temptation
9. The Lick
10. 10K Ho
11. Whoever Who
12. Reservations
13. WPA Radio
14. Southern Bread
15. Paradise
16. A Word to the Underachiever
