= List of Billboard Hot 100 number ones of 2003 =

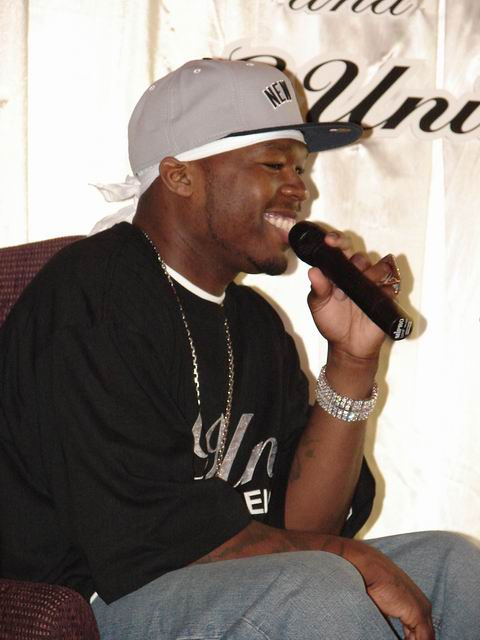
Rapper 50 Cent's "In da Club" was one of the longest-running singles of 2003, topping the chart for nine straight weeks. It was also the best-performing single of 2003.

The Billboard Hot 100 is a chart that ranks the best-performing singles in the United States. Published by Billboard magazine, the data are compiled by Nielsen SoundScan based collectively on each single's weekly physical sales, and airplay. In 2003, there were 11 singles that topped the chart.

During the year, ten acts achieved a first U.S. number-one single, either as a lead artist or featured guest. Those acts were B2K, LL Cool J, 50 Cent, Sean Paul, Nate Dogg, Clay Aiken, Murphy Lee, Ludacris, and Shawnna. Beyoncé, despite having hit number one with Destiny's Child, also earns her first number one song as a solo act. P. Diddy, 50 Cent, Sean Paul, and Beyoncé were the only acts to hit number one more than once, each of them reaching number one twice throughout the year.

50 Cent and Knowles both had the longest-running singles of 2003: 50 Cent's first number-one single "In da Club" and Knowles' second number-one single "Baby Boy" both topped the Hot 100 for nine straight weeks, longer than any single to have topped this year. Hip hop duo OutKast's "Hey Ya!" charted at the top spot for nine consecutive weeks, three of which were in 2003. Although "Hey Ya!" continued its pole position until early 2004, Billboard magazine credited it as one of the longest-running number-one singles of 2003. Rapper Eminem's "Lose Yourself" continued its 12-week chart run at the top spot in this year, but is credited as the longest-running number-one single of 2002. Knowles had the most weeks on top with 17, combining the chart run of both "Crazy in Love" and "Baby Boy". She surpassed the record previously set by 50 Cent during this year, the latter of whom gained a total of 13 weeks at number one combining "In the Club", which is the best-performing single of 2003, and "21 Questions".

With the combined chart run of "Get Busy" and "Baby Boy", the latter in which he is featured, dancehall artist Sean Paul became the most successful Jamaican-born artist in terms of chart performance in the Billboard Hot 100. Seven collaboration singles topped the chart in 2003, setting a record for most number-one collaborations in a calendar year since the onset of the rock era in 1955; the first number-one collaboration to have topped the chart was in 1967 with Somethin' Stupid, a song by singer Frank Sinatra and daughter Nancy Sinatra. The record was later tied in 2004, and broken in 2006 with eight number-one collaborations. American Idol contestant Clay Aiken's debut single "This Is the Night" debuted at number one on the Billboard Hot 100, becoming the first single to do so since 1998. "Crazy in Love", which charted for eight straight weeks in July to August, has been credited as 2003's Song of the Summer.

== Chart history ==
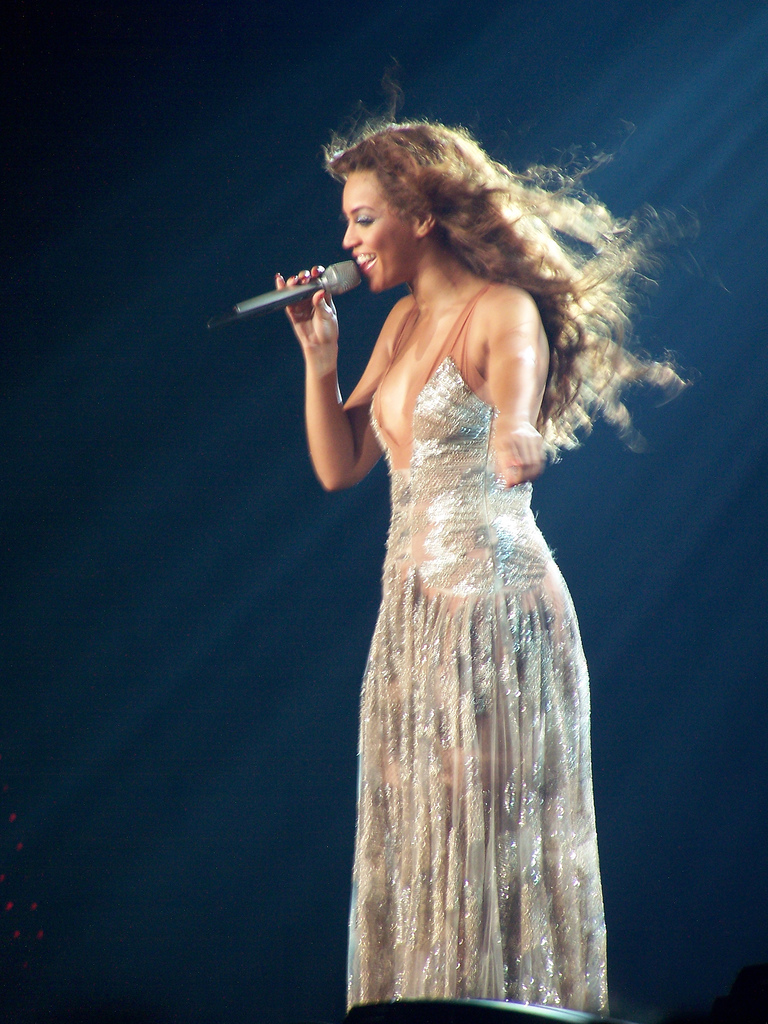
Singer Beyoncé topped the chart two times in 2003 with her singles "Crazy in Love" and "Baby Boy".

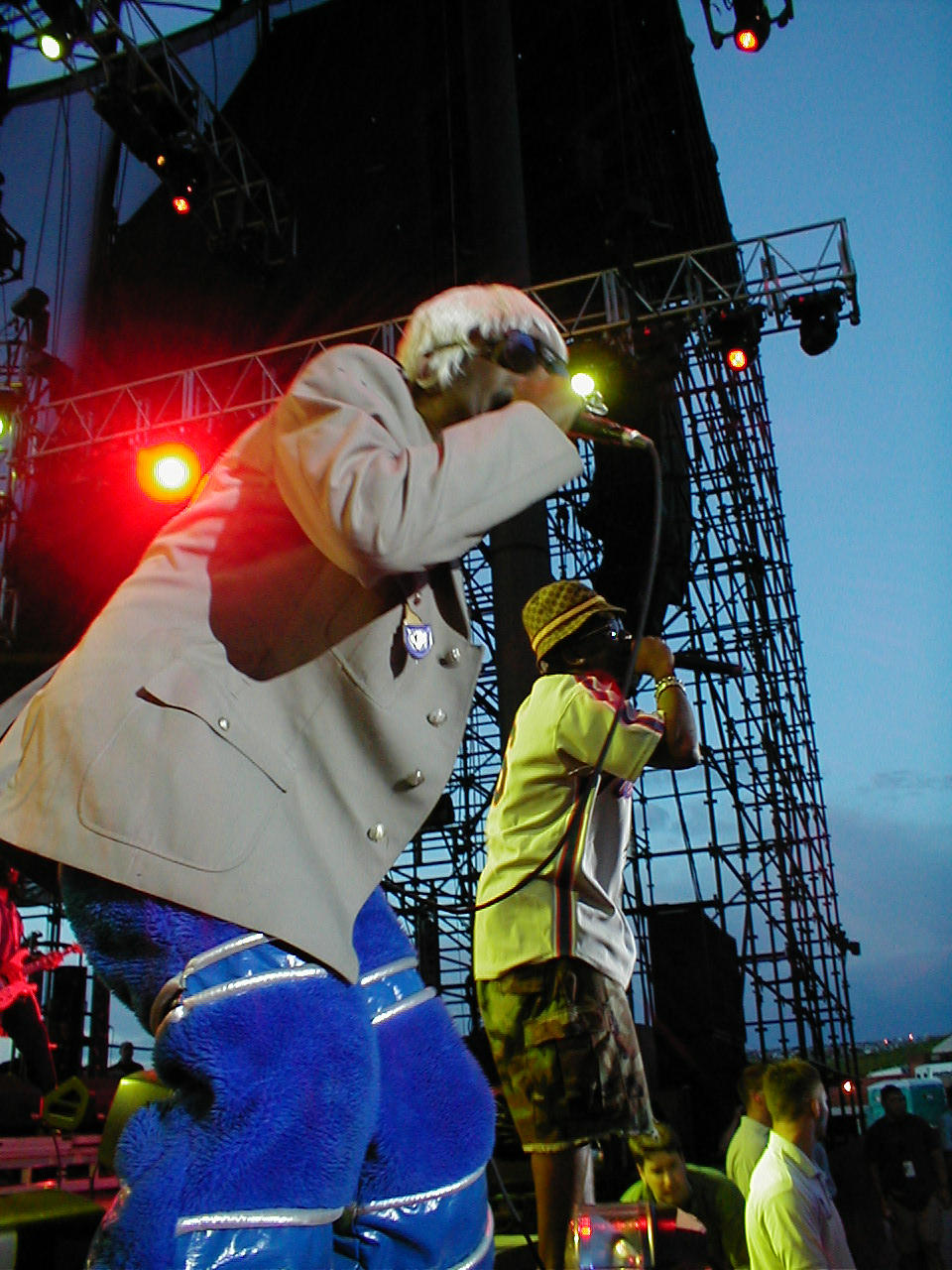
Hip hop duo OutKast's "Hey Ya!" topped the chart for nine consecutive weeks.

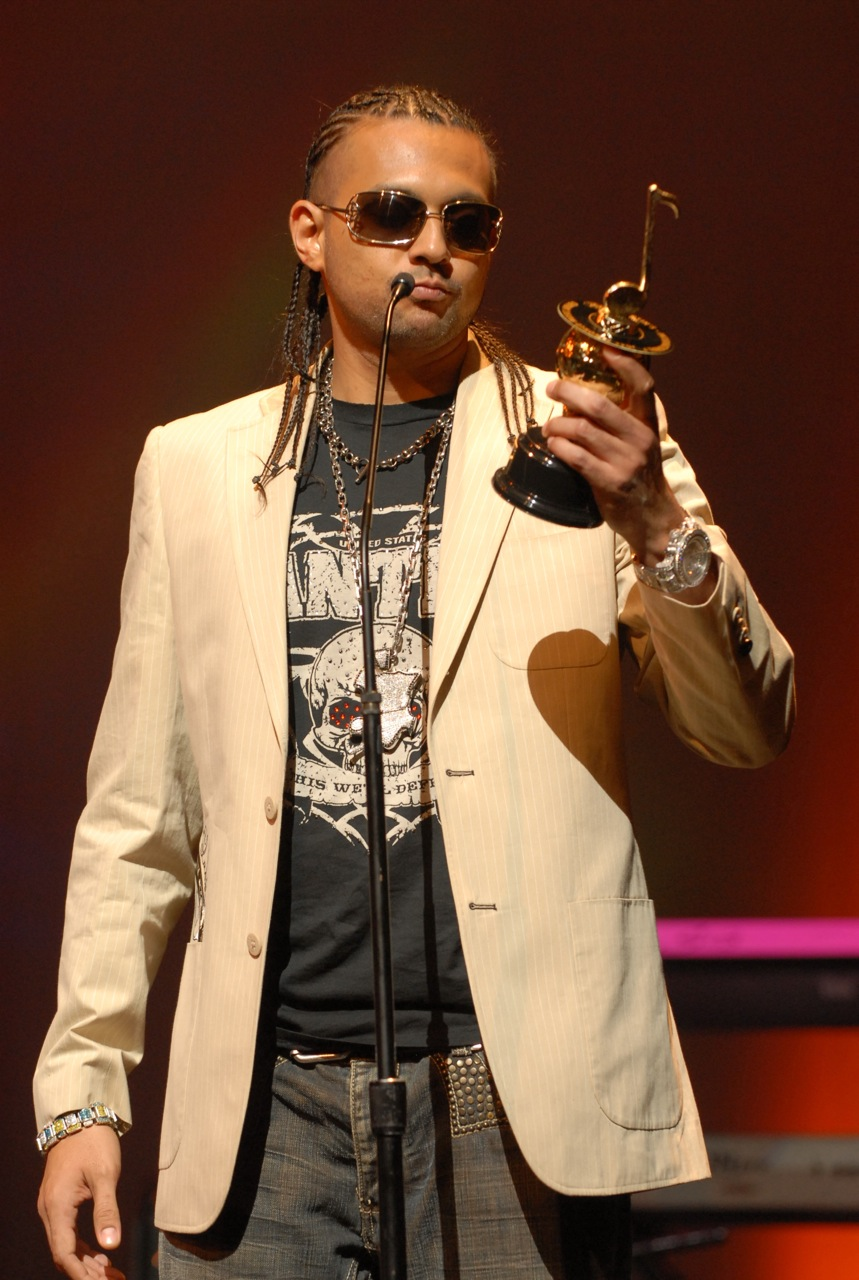
With the combined chart run of "Get Busy" and "Baby Boy", the latter in which he is featured, dancehall artist Sean Paul became the most successful Jamaican-born artist in terms of chart performance in the Hot 100.

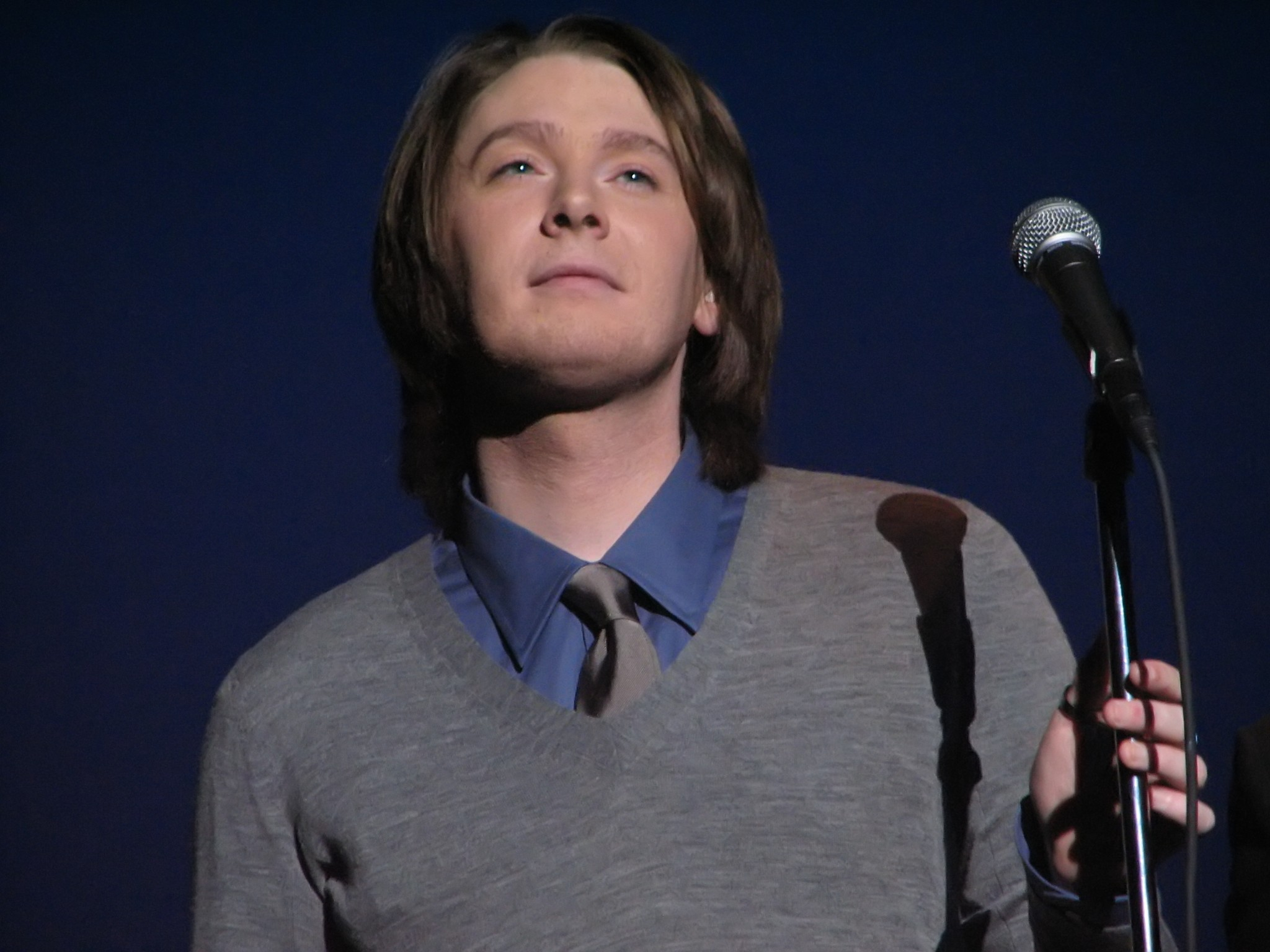
American Idol contestant Clay Aiken's debut single "This Is the Night" debuted at number one on the Billboard Hot 100, becoming the first single to do so since 1998.

Key
†	Indicates best-performing single of 2003

No.	Issue date	Song	Artist(s)	Ref.
888	January 4	"Lose Yourself"	Eminem	
888	January 11	"Lose Yourself"	Eminem	
888	January 18	"Lose Yourself"	Eminem	
888	January 25	"Lose Yourself"	Eminem	
889	February 1	"Bump, Bump, Bump"	B2K featuring P. Diddy	
890	February 8	"All I Have"	Jennifer Lopez featuring LL Cool J	
890	February 15	"All I Have"	Jennifer Lopez featuring LL Cool J	
890	February 22	"All I Have"	Jennifer Lopez featuring LL Cool J	
890	March 1	"All I Have"	Jennifer Lopez featuring LL Cool J	
891	March 8	"In da Club" †	50 Cent	
891	March 15	"In da Club" †	50 Cent	
891	March 22	"In da Club" †	50 Cent	
891	March 29	"In da Club" †	50 Cent	
891	April 5	"In da Club" †	50 Cent	
891	April 12	"In da Club" †	50 Cent	
891	April 19	"In da Club" †	50 Cent	
891	April 26	"In da Club" †	50 Cent	
891	May 3	"In da Club" †	50 Cent	
892	May 10	"Get Busy"	Sean Paul	
892	May 17	"Get Busy"	Sean Paul	
892	May 24	"Get Busy"	Sean Paul	
893	May 31	"21 Questions"	50 Cent featuring Nate Dogg	
893	June 7	"21 Questions"	50 Cent featuring Nate Dogg	
893	June 14	"21 Questions"	50 Cent featuring Nate Dogg	
893	June 21	"21 Questions"	50 Cent featuring Nate Dogg	
894	June 28	"This Is the Night"	Clay Aiken	
894	July 5	"This Is the Night"	Clay Aiken	
895	July 12	"Crazy in Love"	Beyoncé featuring Jay-Z	
895	July 19	"Crazy in Love"	Beyoncé featuring Jay-Z	
895	July 26	"Crazy in Love"	Beyoncé featuring Jay-Z	
895	August 2	"Crazy in Love"	Beyoncé featuring Jay-Z	
895	August 9	"Crazy in Love"	Beyoncé featuring Jay-Z	
895	August 16	"Crazy in Love"	Beyoncé featuring Jay-Z	
895	August 23	"Crazy in Love"	Beyoncé featuring Jay-Z	
895	August 30	"Crazy in Love"	Beyoncé featuring Jay-Z	
896	September 6	"Shake Ya Tailfeather"	Nelly, P. Diddy and Murphy Lee	
896	September 13	"Shake Ya Tailfeather"	Nelly, P. Diddy and Murphy Lee	
896	September 20	"Shake Ya Tailfeather"	Nelly, P. Diddy and Murphy Lee	
896	September 27	"Shake Ya Tailfeather"	Nelly, P. Diddy and Murphy Lee	
897	October 4	"Baby Boy"	Beyoncé featuring Sean Paul	
897	October 11	"Baby Boy"	Beyoncé featuring Sean Paul	
897	October 18	"Baby Boy"	Beyoncé featuring Sean Paul	
897	October 25	"Baby Boy"	Beyoncé featuring Sean Paul	
897	November 1	"Baby Boy"	Beyoncé featuring Sean Paul	
897	November 8	"Baby Boy"	Beyoncé featuring Sean Paul	
897	November 15	"Baby Boy"	Beyoncé featuring Sean Paul	
897	November 22	"Baby Boy"	Beyoncé featuring Sean Paul	
897	November 29	"Baby Boy"	Beyoncé featuring Sean Paul	
898	December 6	"Stand Up"	Ludacris featuring Shawnna	
899	December 13	"Hey Ya!"	OutKast	
899	December 20	"Hey Ya!"	OutKast	
899	December 27	"Hey Ya!"	OutKast	

== Number-one artists ==
List of number-one artists by total weeks at number one
Position	Artist	Weeks at No. 1
1	Beyoncé	17
2	50 Cent	13
3	Sean Paul	12
4	Jay-Z	8
5	P. Diddy	5
6	Eminem	4
6	Jennifer Lopez	4
6	LL Cool J	4
6	Nate Dogg	4
6	Nelly	4
6	Murphy Lee	4
12	OutKast	3
13	Clay Aiken	2
14	B2K	1
14	Ludacris	1
14	Shawnna	1

== See also ==
- 2003 in music
- List of Billboard number-one singles
- Billboard Year-End Hot 100 singles of 2003
- List of Billboard Hot 100 number-one singles of the 2000s

== Additional sources ==
- Fred Bronson's Billboard Book of Number 1 Hits, 5th Edition (ISBN 0-8230-7677-6)
- Joel Whitburn's Top Pop Singles 1955-2008, 12 Edition (ISBN 0-89820-180-2)
- Joel Whitburn Presents the Billboard Hot 100 Charts: The 2000s (ISBN 0-89820-182-9)
- Additional information obtained can be verified within Billboard's online archive services and print editions of the magazine.
