= Drankin' Patnaz =

Studio album by YoungBloodZ
- Released: August 26, 2003
- Recorded: 2002–2003
- Genre: Southern hip-hop; crunk
- Length: 59:40
- Label: So So Def; Arista
- Producer: Mark Twayne (also exec.); the Trackboyz; Robert McDowell; Jazze Pha; Lil' Jon; Oomp Camp; Mello

YoungBloodZ chronology
Against da Grain (1999)	Drankin' Patnaz (2003)	Ev'rybody Know Me (2005)

Singles from Drankin' Patnaz
- 1. "Whatchu Lookin' At" Released: July 16, 2002; 2. "Cadillac Pimpin'" Released: September 3, 2002; 3. "Damn!" Released: June 3, 2003; 4. "Lean Low" Released: September 23, 2003

Professional ratings
Review scores
Source	Rating
AllMusic	4/5 stars
HipHopDX	2/5 stars

Drankin' Patnaz is the second studio album by American Southern hip-hop duo YoungBloodZ, from Atlanta, Georgia. It was released on August 26, 2003, via So So Def/Arista Records. The album features guest appearances from Jazze Pha, Backbone, Killer Mike and Lil' Jon. It debuted at number 5 on the Billboard 200 and at number 1 on the Top R&B/Hip-Hop Albums chart in the United States with first-week sales of 85,036 copies. The album was certified Gold by the Recording Industry Association of America on November 7, 2003.

It is the first album released by So So Def without direct involvement from label founder Jermaine Dupri.

== Track listing ==
No.	Title	Writer(s)	Producer(s)	Length
1.	"Intro"		Mark Twayne	1:30
2.	"Damn!" (featuring Lil' Jon)	Sean Paul Joseph; Jeffrey Grigsby; Jonathan Smith; Cedric Leonard	Lil' Jon	4:58
3.	"Whatchu Lookin' At"	Grigsby; Joseph; Donald Jenkins; William Holmes; Villus Hose; Fredrick Hall	Oomp Camp	3:53
4.	"Sean Paul (Get 'Em Crunk)"	Grigsby; Joseph; Harold Willis	Mark Twayne	5:14
5.	"Hustle" (featuring Killer Mike)	Grigsby; Joseph; Joe Kent; Mark Williams	The Trackboyz	4:25
6.	"Cadillac Pimpin'"	Grigsby; Joseph; Holmes; Ricardo Lewis; Rob McDowell	R.O.B.	4:10
7.	"Oozie I"			0:54
8.	"Mud Pit"	Grigsby; Joseph; Holmes; Clarence Montgomery; Willis	Mark Twayne	3:35
9.	"My Automobile"	Grigsby; Joseph; James Hollins	Mello	3:12
10.	"Lane to Lane"	Grigsby; Joseph; Hose; Holmes; Montgomery; David Fleming; Willis	Mark Twayne	4:10
11.	"Tequila"	Grigsby; Joseph; Kenyatt Stokes; McDowell	R.O.B.	5:02
12.	"Skit #2"			0:48
13.	"Drankin' Patnaz"	Grigsby; Joseph; Hose; Holmes; Montgomery	Drugstore Music	4:22
14.	"Mind on My Money" (featuring Jazze Pha)	Grigsby; Joseph; Phalon Alexander	Jazze Pha	4:42
15.	"Lean Low" (featuring Backbone)	Grigsby; Joseph; Stanley Benton; Mickey Wright	The Trackboyz	3:55
16.	"No Average Playa"	Grigsby; Joseph; Holmes; Stokes; Montez Harris	Presidential Productions	4:50
Total length:				59:40

== Charts ==
=== Weekly charts ===
Chart (2003)	Peak position
US Billboard 200	5
US Top R&B/Hip-Hop Albums (Billboard)	1

=== Year-end charts ===
Chart (2003)	Position
US Billboard 200	164
US Top R&B/Hip-Hop Albums (Billboard)	51

== Certifications ==
Region	Certification	Certified units/sales
United States (RIAA)	Gold	500,000^{^}
^{^} Shipments figures based on certification alone.
