= Against da Grain =

Studio album by YoungBloodZ
- Released: October 12, 1999
- Recorded: 1998–1999
- Genre: Southern hip-hop
- Length: 1:04:04
- Label: LaFace; Arista
- Producer: Kawan Prather (exec.); P.A. (also exec.); Mark Twayne; Pretty Ken; Robert McDowell; Emperor Searcy; Organized Noize; Cooley C; Mixzo

YoungBloodZ chronology
Against da Grain (1999)	Drankin' Patnaz (2003)

Professional ratings
Review scores
Source	Rating
AllMusic	3/5 stars
RapReviews	8/10
The Source	3.5/5 stars

Against da Grain is the debut studio album by American Southern hip-hop duo YoungBloodZ, from Atlanta, Georgia. It was released on October 12, 1999, by LaFace Records and Arista Records. The album features guest appearances from Backbone, Big Boi, Bone Crusher and Lil Wayne. It peaked at number 92 on the Billboard 200 and at number 21 on the Top R&B/Hip-Hop Albums chart in the United States.

== Track listing ==
No.	Title	Producer(s)	Length
1.	"Youngbloodz Intro / GP's Interlude"	Mark Twayne; Pretty Ken	2:54
2.	"Shakem' Off"	Mark Twayne; Pretty Ken	3:42
3.	"Pop, Pop, Pop / Cuttin' Tonight Interlude"	R.O.B.; Emperor Searcy	5:58
4.	"85 / Billy Dee Interlude" (featuring Big Boi)	P.A.	4:29
5.	"U-Way (How We Do It)"	Mark Twayne; Pretty Ken	4:34
6.	"Hot Heat" (featuring Backbone & Bone Crusher)	Organized Noize	4:07
7.	"6 to 14 in 12"	Mark Twayne; Pretty Ken	4:13
8.	"Down Heya (In the South)"	Mark Twayne; Pretty Ken	4:29
9.	"Thangs Movin' Slow"	Cooley C	4:12
10.	"It's the Money / Fake ID Interlude"	P.A.	4:57
11.	"Booty Club Playa"	P.A.	3:38
12.	"87 Fleetwood"	Mark Twayne; Pretty Ken	4:10
13.	"Get It How We Get It / Splack-Interlude"	R.O.B.; Emperor Searcy	4:49
14.	"Just a Dream"	Mark Twayne; Pretty Ken	2:25
15.	"U-Way (How We Do It) (Remix)" (featuring Lil' Wayne)	Mixzo	4:42
Total length:			1:04:04

== Charts ==
Chart (1999)	Peak position
US Billboard 200	92
US Top R&B/Hip-Hop Albums (Billboard)	21
