= Presidential (song) =

2005 single by YoungBloodZ

Single by YoungBloodZ

from the album Ev'rybody Know Me
- Released: June 5, 2005
- Genre: Southern hip hop, crunk
- Length: 4:01 4:00 (Radio Edit)
- Label: LaFace Records
- Songwriters: Jeffrey Ray Grigsby (J-Bo), William Andrew Holmes, LaMarquis Jefferson, Sean Paul Joseph (Sean P), Craig Love, James Elbert Phillips, Lil Jon
- Producer: Lil Jon

YoungBloodZ singles chronology
"Datz Me" (2005)	"Presidential" (2005)	"Chop Chop" (2006)

"Presidential" is a song by rap duo YoungBloodZ. It was released in June 2005 as the second single from their third studio album Ev'rybody Know Me. The song peaked at number 81 on the U.S. Billboard Hot 100 chart and number 20 on the U.S. Billboard Hot Rap Tracks chart. An official remix was released on the same album featuring Akon.

== Music video ==
The music video was directed by Lenny Bass and premiered in August 2005. The music video features a cameo from T-Pain, Chris Brown, Bone Crusher, members of Nappy Roots, 8Ball & MJG, and Boyz n da Hood.

== Charts ==
Chart (2005)	Peak position
US Billboard Hot 100	81
US Hot R&B/Hip-Hop Songs (Billboard)	26
US Hot Rap Songs (Billboard)	20
