= Ev'rybody Know Me =

Studio album by YoungBloodZ
- Released: December 13, 2005
- Genre: Southern hip-hop; crunk
- Length: 1:01:58
- Label: LaFace; Zomba
- Producer: Jamil Debardlabon; Daz Dillinger; Jazze Pha; Lil' Jon; Mannie Fresh; Mark Twayne; Mr. Collipark; Proverb; Raw Beatzz; Sanchez Holmes; Scott Storch; Akon

YoungBloodZ chronology
Drankin' Patnaz (2003)	Ev'rybody Know Me (2005)	Still Grippin' tha Grain: The Best Of (2006)

Singles from Ev'rybody Know Me
- 1. "Datz Me" Released: January 11, 2005; 2. "Presidential" Released: July 12, 2005; 3. "Chop Chop" Released: February 21, 2006

Professional ratings
Review scores
Source	Rating
AllMusic	3/5 stars
Blender	3/5 stars
RapReviews	5/10

Ev'rybody Know Me is the third studio album by American Southern hip-hop duo YoungBloodZ from Atlanta, Georgia. It was released on December 13, 2005, via LaFace Records. The album features guest appearances from Akon, Ben-Hated, Cutty Cartel, Daz Dillinger, Jazze Pha, Lil' Scrappy, Mannie Fresh, Mr. Mo, Proverb, Shawty Putt, T-Boz and Young Buck. It peaked at number 44 on the Billboard 200, at number 7 on the Top R&B/Hip-Hop Albums chart and at number 4 on the Top Rap Albums chart in the United States.

== Track listing ==
No.	Title	Writer(s)	Producer(s)	Length
1.	"Intro"	Sean Paul Joseph; Jeffrey Grigsby	Jamil Debardlabon	1:01
2.	"Chop Chop"	Joseph; Grigsby; Scott Storch	Scott Storch	4:41
3.	"Presidential"	Joseph; Grigsby; Jonathan Smith; Craig Love; LaMarquis Jefferson; James Phillips; William Holmes	Lil Jon	4:01
4.	"Datz Me" (featuring Young Buck)	Joseph; Grigsby; Montez Harris; David Brown; Marquinarius Holmes	Sanchez Holmes	4:00
5.	"Excuse Me Shawty" (featuring Lil Scrappy)	Joseph; Grigsby; Shiwen Shann; Darryl Richardson; Jamil Debardlabon	Jamil Debardlabon	4:32
6.	"Ev'rybody Know Me"	Joseph; Grigsby; Debardlabon; Willie Dennis; Isaac Hayes; Brad Jordan; Doug King	Jamil Debardlabon	4:11
7.	"What tha Biz (If I)" (featuring Mannie Fresh)	Joseph; Grigsby; Byron Thomas	Mannie Fresh	3:54
8.	"Haterproof" (featuring Proverb)	Joseph; Grigsby; Jared Dunmars	Proverb	4:14
9.	"V.I.P." (Interlude)			0:47
10.	"Spending Some Change" (featuring Cutty Cartel)	Joseph; Grigsby; Ricardo Lewis; Ashley Bell	Raw Beatzz	4:03
11.	"It's Good" (featuring T-Boz)	Joseph; Grigsby; Michael Crooms; Kandi Burruss	Mr. Collipark	3:37
12.	"Play Ur Position" (featuring Jazze Pha & Mr. Mo)	Joseph; Grigsby; Phalon Alexander; Damon Green	Jazze Pha	4:53
13.	"Sum'n Like a Pimp" (featuring Ben-Hated)	Joseph; Grigsby; Debardlabon	Jamil Debardlabon	4:15
14.	"Diamond Rings" (featuring Daz Dillinger)	Joseph; Grigsby; Delmar Arnaud	Daz Dillinger	3:26
15.	"Grown Man" (featuring Shawty Putt)	Joseph; Grigsby; Harold Willis; W. Holmes	Mark Twayne	4:09
16.	"Presidential tha Remix" (featuring Akon)	Joseph; Grigsby; Smith; Love; Jefferson; Phillips; W. Holmes	Akon	6:14
Total length:				1:01:58

Sample credits

- "Ev'rybody Know Me" contains a portion of the composition "Mind Playing Tricks on Me", written by Willie Dennis, Isaac Hayes, Brad Jordan, and Doug King.

== Charts ==
=== Weekly charts ===
Chart (2005)	Peak position
US Billboard 200	44
US Top R&B/Hip-Hop Albums (Billboard)	7
US Top Rap Albums (Billboard)	4

=== Year-end charts ===
Chart (2006)	Position
US Top R&B/Hip-Hop Albums (Billboard)	81
