= Damn! (song) =

2003 single by YoungBloodZ

Single by YoungBloodZ featuring Lil Jon

from the album Drankin' Patnaz
- A-side: "Drunk It (Girl Twerking)"
- B-side: "Drap It, Snap It, Crack It (ft. Kevin Lyttle)"
- Released: June 16, 2003
- Recorded: 2003
- Genre: Crunk
- Length: 4:59 (album version): 4:00 (radio edit)
- Label: So So Def; Arista
- Songwriters: Sean Joseph; Jeffrey Grigsby; Jonathan Smith
- Producer: Lil Jon

YoungBloodZ singles chronology
"Cadillac Pimpin'" (2002)	"Damn!" (2003)	"Lean Low" (2003)

Lil Jon singles chronology
"Get Low" (2003)	"Damn!" (2003)	"Shake That Monkey" (2003)

"Damn!" is a song by the Atlanta rap duo YoungBloodZ. It was released as the second single from their second studio album Drankin' Patnaz, and was produced and guest performed by Lil Jon. A club mix appears on the duo's third studio album Ev'rybody Know Me. It is their biggest hit song to date, peaking at number four on the U.S. Billboard Hot 100 and remaining YoungBloodZ's sole top ten single.

== Background ==
While recording the album, the group didn’t feel like it had any singles so they contacted Jermaine Dupri who was executive producing the project, to go back into the recording studio. The duo's attorney, Vince Phillips, who also a business partner and friend of the producer Lil Jon called him in to produce the new track for the duo. "Instantly, man, we knew it was the one. You could tell by the energy in the room" says J-Bo.

Lil Jon's BME Recording artist, Bohagon was in attendance and wrote the hook for the song.

== Reception ==
Ranked #47 on Complex Magazines Best 100 Songs of 2000s, the single won Single of the Year/Collaboration at the 2004 Source Awards. The songwriters also won ASCAP and BMI awards for the song in the same year, and was also nominated for Top R&B/Hip-Hop Singles, Top R&B/Hip-Hop Singles-Airplay and Hot Rap Tracks at the 2004 Hip-Hop/R&B Billboard Awards.

In 2018, the song was featured in an episode of the ABC TV series, Single Parents.

== Track listing ==
CD single

1. "Damn!" (Radio edit)
2. "Damn!" (Album version)

Digital download

1. "Damn!" (Single version)

== Remix ==
The official remix is called "Damn! (So So Def Remix)", and features Lil Jon, Ludacris, Jermaine Dupri, & Bone Crusher. An underground version featuring Young Buck and Fabolous is also available.

== Charts ==
=== Weekly charts ===
Chart (2003)	Peak position
US Billboard Hot 100	4
US Dance/Mix Show Airplay (Billboard)	25
US Hot R&B/Hip-Hop Songs (Billboard)	2
US Hot Rap Songs (Billboard)	1
US Rhythmic Airplay (Billboard)	5

=== Year-end charts ===
Chart (2003)	Position
US Billboard Hot 100	46
US Hot R&B/Hip-Hop Songs (Billboard)	20

Chart (2004)	Position
US Billboard Hot 100	68
US Hot R&B/Hip-Hop Songs (Billboard)	38
