= Gossip Folks =

2002 single by Missy Elliott

Single by Missy Elliott featuring Ludacris

from the album Under Construction
- Released: December 9, 2002
- Studio: Hit Factory Criteria (Miami, Florida); PatchWerk (Atlanta, Georgia)
- Length: 3:54
- Label: Elektra; The Goldmind Inc.; Violator
- Songwriters: Missy Elliott; Tim Mosley; Christopher Bridges
- Producer: Timbaland

Missy Elliott singles chronology
"Honk Your Horn" (2002)	"Gossip Folks" (2002)	"Fighting Temptation" (2003)

Ludacris singles chronology
"B R Right" (2002)	"Gossip Folks" (2002)	"Act a Fool" (2003)

Music video
- "Gossip Folks" on YouTube

"Gossip Folks" is a song by American rapper Missy Elliott featuring fellow American rapper Ludacris, released as the second single from her fourth studio album, Under Construction (2002), on December 9, 2002. Written alongside producer Timbaland, it peaked at number eight on the US Billboard Hot 100, topped the Billboard Dance Club Play chart, and reached number nine on the UK Singles Chart.

== Background ==
The song is Missy's response to different rumors about her (e.g., her sexual orientation, her weight), and essentially tells those who spread these rumors to mind their own business. The refrain of "Gossip Folks" samples the 1981 song "Double Dutch Bus" by Frankie Smith.

== Music video ==
The music video for "Gossip Folks" was directed by Dave Meyers, with principal photography taking place in late 2002 and premiered on Total Request Live on January 2, 2003. Recaps In the beginning Elliott is walking through the hallway when students start announcing her entrance and begin to start rumors about her.

As Missy's verse starts, Missy and the students begin dancing through the chorus. The second verse starts in the cafeteria where Missy has her group of students have a food fight with another group. Also in the cafeteria are Tweet, Eve, and Trina impressing while sitting on a cafeteria table.

In the middle of the video a clip of "Funky Fresh Dressed" featuring Ms. Jade was played. The "Funky Fresh Dressed" segment of the video features Elliott and Ms. Jade with their green shades in a classroom. Missy begins to aggravate the teacher Faizon Love while Ms. Jade takes over the class with a yardstick as a symbol of power. Ludacris's verse begins directly after the "Funky Fresh Dressed" segment. He appears to be the principal.

The bus driver who appears in the last 10 seconds is Darryl McDaniels (DMC of Run-DMC). Toward the end of the video a mural dedicated to the late R&B/hip hop stars Aaliyah (1979–2001), Lisa Lopes (1971–2002), and Jam Master Jay (1965–2002) is shown. The video features several young dancers, including Monica Parales of former girl group School Gyrls and Alyson Stoner of The JammX Kids. Monica Parales auditioned for the role of Lead Kid Dancer in "Work It", but lost the role to Alyson Stoner. Monica eventually co-starred with Alyson in "Gossip Folks" and "I'm Really Hot". The music video also stars dancer and actress Jenna Dewan from Step Up.

=== Tributes in the end of the video ===
- Aaliyah Dana Haughton (born January 16, 1979 – died August 25, 2001) – plane accident
- Lisa Nicole Lopes (born May 27, 1971 – died April 25, 2002) – car accident
- Jason William Mizell (born January 21, 1965 – died October 30, 2002) – murdered

== Track listings ==
US 12-inch single

A1. "Gossip Folks" (amended version)
A2. "Gossip Folks" (album version)
B1. "Gossip Folks" (instrumental)
B2. "Gossip Folks" (a cappella)
B3. "Gossip Folks" (TV track)

UK CD single

1. "Gossip Folks" (Fatboy Slim radio remix) – 3:31
2. "Gossip Folks" (Fatboy Slim remix) – 6:42
3. "Gossip Folks" (original version) – 3:54
4. "Gossip Folks" (Fatboy Slim remix video)

UK 12-inch single

A. "Gossip Folks" (Fatboy Slim remix) – 6:42
B. "Gossip Folks" (original version) – 3:54

European CD single 1

1. "Gossip Folks" (Fatboy Slim remix) – 6:42
2. "Gossip Folks" (original version) – 3:54

European CD single 2

1. "Gossip Folks" (Mousse T. & Royal Garden remix radio) – 3:37
2. "Gossip Folks" (Fatboy Slim remix) – 6:42

Australian CD single

1. "Gossip Folks" (Fatboy Slim radio remix) – 3:31
2. "Gossip Folks" (Fatboy Slim remix) – 6:42
3. "Gossip Folks" (original version) – 3:54
4. "Gossip Folks" (Mousse T.'s original alternative) – 3:47
5. "Gossip Folks" (Mousse T.'s Pogo remix extended) – 5:04
6. "Gossip Folks" (Mousse T. & Royal Garden remix extended) – 5:19
7. "Gossip Folks" (original video)

== Charts ==
=== Weekly charts ===
Chart (2002–2003)	Peak position
Australia (ARIA)	22
Australian Urban (ARIA)	8
Belgium (Ultratop 50 Flanders)	24
Belgium (Ultratip Bubbling Under Wallonia)	14
Canada (Nielsen SoundScan)	39
Canada CHR (Nielsen BDS)	10
Denmark (Tracklisten)	6
Europe (Eurochart Hot 100)	20
Germany (GfK)	28
Ireland (IRMA)	28
Italy (FIMI)	32
Netherlands (Dutch Top 40)	40
Netherlands (Single Top 100)	50
Scottish Singles Sales (Official Charts)	13
Sweden (Sverigetopplistan)	24
Switzerland (Schweizer Hitparade)	50
UK Singles (Official Charts)	9
UK Hip Hop/R&B (Official Charts)	3
US Billboard Hot 100	8
US Dance Club Songs (Billboard) Fatboy Slim mixes	1
US Dance Singles Sales (Billboard) Fatboy Slim remix	11
US Hot R&B/Hip-Hop Songs (Billboard)	5
US Hot Rap Songs (Billboard)	2
US Pop Airplay (Billboard)	8
US Rhythmic Airplay (Billboard)	4

=== Year-end charts ===
Chart (2003)	Position
UK Singles (OCC)	107
US Billboard Hot 100	43
US Hot R&B/Hip-Hop Singles & Tracks (Billboard)	44
US Hot Rap Tracks (Billboard)	19
US Mainstream Top 40 (Billboard)	67
US Rhythmic Top 40 (Billboard)	27

== Release history ==
Region	Date	Format(s)	Label(s)	Ref.
United States	December 9, 2002	Rhythmic contemporary; urban radio	Elektra; Goldmind; Violator	
United States	January 27, 2003	Contemporary hit radio	Elektra; Goldmind; Violator	
United Kingdom	March 10, 2003	12-inch vinyl; CD	Elektra; Goldmind; Violator	
Australia	March 24, 2003	CD	Elektra; Goldmind; Violator	
