= In da Club =

2003 single by 50 Cent

Single by 50 Cent

from the album Get Rich or Die Tryin'
- B-side: "Back Down"; "Wanksta"
- Released: January 7, 2003
- Recorded: June 2002
- Genre: East Coast hip-hop; gangsta rap
- Length: 3:13 (album version); 3:45 (radio version)
- Label: Aftermath; Shady; Interscope
- Songwriters: Curtis Jackson; Andre Young; Mike Elizondo
- Producers: Dr. Dre; Mike Elizondo

50 Cent singles chronology
"Wanksta" (2002)	"In da Club" (2003)	"21 Questions" (2003)

Audio sample
- file; help

Alternative cover

Music video
- "In Da Club" on YouTube

"In da Club" is a song by American rapper 50 Cent from his debut studio album Get Rich or Die Tryin' (2003). Written by 50 Cent alongside producers Dr. Dre and Mike Elizondo, the song, which uses an unconventional off-beat rhythm, was released to digital download in the United States on January 7, 2003, as the album's lead single and peaked at number one on the US Billboard Hot 100, becoming 50 Cent's first number-one single.

"In da Club" received praise from critics; at the 46th Grammy Awards, it was nominated for Best Male Rap Solo Performance and Best Rap Song. The accompanying music video for "In Da Club" won Best Rap Video and Best New Artist at the 2003 MTV Video Music Awards. In 2009, the song was listed at number 24 in Billboard's Hot 100 Songs of the Decade. It was listed at number 13 in Rolling Stone's "Best Songs of the Decade". In 2010, it was ranked 448th in Rolling Stone's 500 Greatest Songs of All Time list. It was performed by 50 Cent in the Super Bowl LVI halftime show on February 13, 2022.

== Background ==
After 50 Cent was discovered by fellow rapper Eminem in 2002, he flew to Los Angeles where he was introduced to record producer Dr. Dre. "In da Club" was the first of seven tracks he recorded in five days with Dr. Dre. 50 Cent described the studio sessions, saying:

Dre, he'll play dope beats ... [He'll say], 'These are the hits, 50. So pick one of these and make a couple of singles or something.' The very first time he heard [me rap on] 'In Da Club' he said, 'Yo, I didn't think you was going to go there with it, but, you know, it works.' He was probably thinking of going in a different direction with that song. Then he expanded it into a hit record.

Dr. Dre and Mike Elizondo created the production that became "In da Club" around "six months before" its release, as one of five productions developed from the same drum programming. It was originally given to the hip-hop group D12 for a potential contribution to the 8 Mile soundtrack (2002), but the group passed it on as they did not know how to approach the song. It was also offered to fellow Aftermath artist Rakim, but due to creative tensions with Dr. Dre his version was never released. Immediately taking a liking to the production upon hearing it, 50 Cent wrote all the song's lyrics in around an hour. Since much of the content on Get Rich or Die Tryin' was "dark", he wanted to write material that was "the exact opposite". He called the song a "celebration of life. Every day it's relevant all over 'cause every day is someone's birthday." According to Sha Money XL, 50 Cent developed the chorus from a lyric by his G-Unit colleague Lloyd Banks ("Find me in the club, bottle full of Bubb"), observing that "Fifty heard it and knew how to make it a hook and make it hot".

50 Cent first recorded the track with only the drum beat present, in the basement studio of Sha Money XL's home in Long Island. It was then re-recorded two weeks later in the Los Angeles sessions, where Dr. Dre and Elizondo also added additional synths and an eight-note guitar section. Elizondo told Vibe in 2013 that "We didn't want to layer it with too much stuff to clutter it up ... Dre was using the concept of 'less is more', but make it sound as big as possible".

== Critical reception ==
"In da Club" received universal acclaim by music critics. AllMusic described it as "a tailor-made mass-market good-time single". The Source called the song a "guaranteed party starter" with its "blaring horns, funky organs, guitar riffs and sparse hand claps". The BBC also wrote that the song is "a spectacular party anthem" that "highlights 50 Cent's ability to twist his words effortlessly". Entertainment Weekly noted that 50 Cent "boasts unashamedly of his career objectives and newly flush bank account" with lyrics such as "I'm feelin' focus, man, my money on my mind/Got a mil out the deal and I'm still on the grind."

Rolling Stone wrote that the song sports "a spare yet irresistible synth hook augmented by a tongue-twisting refrain".The Guardian called the track "irresistible" due to its "sparse orchestral samples and snaking chorus", and Pitchfork Media said, "the bounce on 'In da Club' is straight-up irresistible, Dre at both minimalist best and most deceptively infectious." Splendid magazine called the song an "insanely catchy" single with its "stanky, horn-addled thump". The track was listed at number ten on Blender magazine's "The 500 Greatest Songs Since You Were Born". In 2008, it was ranked at number 18 on VH1's "100 Greatest Hip Hop Songs".

== Chart performance ==
Dr. Dre produced "If I Can't". But Em wanted "In da Club". In the end they were deadlocked, so they asked me and I told them, real quiet, "In da Club'."

— 50 Cent

"In da Club" debuted on the US Billboard charts on issue date of January 11, 2003, and debuted at number 67. A couple of weeks later the song ascended to the top 10; after eight weeks, the song topped the charts, becoming his first number one, and stayed there for nine consecutive weeks on the Billboard Hot 100, blocking R. Kelly's "Ignition (Remix)" for five weeks. The song was later replaced by Sean Paul's "Get Busy" and remained in the top 10 for 17 weeks, and on the chart for 30 weeks. The track also reached number one on the Top 40 Tracks, Hot R&B/Hip-Hop Songs, and Hot Rap Tracks charts. In March 2003, it broke a Billboard record as the "most listened-to" song in radio history within a week. Billboard also ranked it as the number one song for 2003. The Recording Industry Association of America certified the track Gold. In 2023, it was certified Diamond by the RIAA. Nominated for Best Male Rap Solo Performance and Best Rap Song at the 2004 Grammy Awards, it lost to Eminem's "Lose Yourself".

Across Europe, it reached number one in Croatia, Denmark, Germany, Ireland, Switzerland, Austria, Belgium, Finland, Greece, Norway, Sweden, and the Netherlands, and number three in the UK. In Australia, the single peaked at number one, was certified two times Platinum by the Australian Recording Industry Association, and on the 2003 year-end chart, it was listed at number five.

== Music video ==
Philip Atwell directed the music video on December 10–11, 2002. Almost all the film footage was used in the video except for a scene where 50 Cent raps in a glass box. Set in a fictional hip-hop boot camp known as the "Shady/Aftermath Artist Development Center", the video begins with a black Hummer driving to the facility at an unknown location, marked "Somewhere...", (actually the Volcano House in Newberry Springs). Video clips from Eminem's single "Without Me" are seen playing in the entrance on flat-screen TVs. Eminem and Dr. Dre are seen looking down at the lab from a lab balcony with windows. 50 Cent is introduced by hanging upside down from a gym roof. Atwell commented, "I think I could have done better with it, but I really liked the way that it turned out". The video also contains a shooting range, which Atwell deemed appropriate because 50 Cent had been shot nine times. He said, "creatively, I felt like we were able to put guns in a video and have it play. And I like it when you are able to play within the standards and still give the artist something symbolic of what they are going for."

The video ends with the camera zooming out of the club to reveal a two-way mirror with Eminem and Dr. Dre in white lab uniforms, observing 50 Cent and taking notes. Atwell stated that "seeing 50 with Dre and Em having his back is as big a visual statement as it is a musical statement" and the shot was significant because it made clear the club was inside the center and not unrelated performance footage. On January 27, 2003, the video debuted on MTV's Total Request Live at number nine and stayed on the chart for fifty days. It also reached number one on the MuchMusic video charts. At the 2003 MTV Video Music Awards, the video was awarded Best Rap Video and Best New Artist and was nominated for Video of the Year, Best Male Video, and Viewer's Choice. Cameos include: Dr. Dre, D12, Lloyd Banks, Tony Yayo, The Game (in his first cameo appearance), Bang Em Smurf, DJ Lady Tribe, Young Buck, Xzibit and DJ Whoo Kid.

The music video on YouTube has received over 2.5 billion views as of October 2025.

== Lawsuit ==
In January 2006, 50 Cent was sued for copyright infringement by former 2 Live Crew manager Joseph Weinberger, who owns the rights to the rap group's catalog. He claimed that 50 Cent plagiarized the lines "it's your birthday" from the eponymous second track of former 2 Live Crew frontman Luther Campbell's 1994 album Freak for Life 6996 (also known simply as Freak for Life). The lawsuit was dismissed by U.S. District Judge Paul Huck, who ruled that the phrase was a "common, unoriginal and noncopyrightable element of the song". 50 Cent's attorneys in the litigation included noted entertainment litigator Jeffrey D. Goldman.

== "Sexy Lil Thug" ==
"Sexy Lil Thug"

Song by Beyoncé
- Recorded: 2003
- Genre: Hip-hop; R&B
- Length: 3:10
- Label: Columbia
- Songwriters: Beyoncé Knowles; Shawn Carter; Curtis Jackson; Andre Young; Mike Elizondo
- Producer: Dr. Dre

In 2003, American recording artist Beyoncé recorded "Sexy Lil Thug", a remix version of "In da Club". Her version uses the original's instrumental and melody with the singer singing her own, newly added verses. In the song, she references Jimmy Choo shoes, Marilyn Monroe, Marc Jacobs, and Bailey Bank and Biddle. Makkada B. Selah of The Village Voice said, "Her version of 'In da Club' outed 50 Cent as a singing-ass rapper with lines like 'Don't wanna be your girl/I ain't lookin' for no love/So come give me a hug/You a sexy little thug.'" Joey Guerra of the Houston Chronicle coined Beyoncé's cover version as a "female spin" on the original. The song has been released on unofficial Beyoncé mixtapes. According to Guerra of the Houston Chronicle, the song was never an official single, likely because of permission issues.

Beyoncé's version of the song charted for 7 weeks and peaked at number 67 on the US Billboard Hot R&B/Hip-Hop Songs chart. In 2013, Mike Wass of the website Idolator put "Sexy Lil Thug" at number six on his list of "Beyonce's 10 Best Unreleased and Rare Tracks". He described it as a "radio staple" in 2003, adding that it "remains something of a lost gem" and concluded, "Queen Bey spit iconic lyrics like 'I'm that classy mami with the Marilyn Monroe body'".

=== Sampling ===
"In da Club" has been sampled or interpolated in at least 90 songs, including "Mi Gna" by Super Sako, "Good Life" by Kanye West, "Genesis" by Justice and "Iffy" by Chris Brown.

== Appearances in other media ==
The song is featured in the films Soul Plane, Shark Tale, Beauty Shop, Dead Tone, and Detention, as well as the theatrical trailers for horror films Happy Death Day (2017) and Happy Death Day 2U (2019). It is also featured in the television shows The Wire, CSI: Crime Scene Investigation, Revenge, Lucifer, and The Fall. It was performed by 50 Cent in the Super Bowl LVI halftime show on February 13, 2022. It also was released on Fuser, being one of the first songs to be announced for the game.

== Track listing ==
- UK CD single
1. "In da Club" (Single Version) (Clean) – 3:46
2. "In da Club" (Single Version) (Explicit) – 3:45
3. "Wanksta" – 3:41
- German CD single
1. "In da Club" (Single Version) (Explicit) – 3:48
2. "Wanksta" – 3:41
- German and Australian CD single
1. "In da Club" (Single Version) (Explicit) – 3:48
2. "Wanksta" – 3:41
3. "In da Club" (Instrumental) – 6:18
4. "In da Club" (Music Video) – 3:53
5. "Wanksta" (Music Video) – 3:43

== Personnel ==
Information taken from the liner notes of Get Rich or Die Tryin'.

- Vocals, lyrics: 50 Cent
- Producer: Dr. Dre
- Co-producer: Mike Elizondo
- Audio mixing: Dr. Dre
- Recording engineers: Mauricio "Veto" Iragorri, Sha Money XL
- Assistant engineers: James "Flea" McCrone, Francis Forde, Ruben Rivera
- Keyboards, guitars, bass: Mike Elizondo
- Percussion: DJ Quik

== Charts ==
=== Weekly charts ===
2003 weekly chart performance for "In da Club"
Chart (2003)	Peak position
Australia (ARIA)	1
Australian Urban (ARIA)	1
Austria (Ö3 Austria Top 40)	3
Belgium (Ultratop 50 Flanders)	2
Belgium (Ultratop 50 Wallonia)	4
Canada (Canadian Singles Chart)	1
Canada CHR (Nielsen BDS)	1
Columbia (Notimex)	1
Croatia (HRT)	1
Denmark (Tracklisten)	1
Eurochart Hot 100 (Music & Media)	1
Finland (Suomen virallinen lista)	8
France (SNEP)	16
Germany (GfK)	1
Greece (IFPI Greece)	3
Hungary (Dance Top 40)	16
Ireland (IRMA)	1
Italy (FIMI)	9
Latvia (Latvian Airplay Top 50)	7
Netherlands (Dutch Top 40)	2
Netherlands (Single Top 100)	2
New Zealand (Recorded Music NZ)	1
Norway (VG-lista)	3
Romania (Romanian Top 100)	4
Scottish Singles Sales (Official Charts)	4
Sweden (Sverigetopplistan)	4
Switzerland (Schweizer Hitparade)	1
UK Singles (Official Charts)	3
UK Hip Hop/R&B (Official Charts)	1
US Billboard Hot 100	1
US Hot R&B/Hip-Hop Songs (Billboard)	1
US Hot Rap Songs (Billboard)	1
US Pop Airplay (Billboard)	1
US Rhythmic Airplay (Billboard)	1

2022 and 2023 weekly chart performance for "In da Club"
Chart (2022–2023)	Peak position
Canada Hot 100 (Billboard)	40
Canada Digital Song Sales (Billboard)	10
Global 200 (Billboard)	44
Latvia (LAIPA)	12
Slovakia (Singles Digitál Top 100)	50

=== Year-end charts ===
2003 year-end chart performance for "In da Club"
Chart (2003)	Position
Australia (ARIA)	5
Austria (Ö3 Austria Top 75)	37
Belgium (Ultratop 50 Flanders)	9
Belgium (Ultratop 40 Wallonia)	13
Eurochart Hot 100 (Billboard)	7
France (SNEP)	57
Germany (Media Control GfK)	10
Ireland (IRMA)	3
Italy (FIMI)	28
Netherlands (Dutch Top 40)	8
Netherlands (Single Top 100)	18
New Zealand (RIANZ)	4
Romania (Romanian Top 100)	1
Sweden (Hitlistan)	10
Switzerland (Schweizer Hitparade)	8
UK Singles (OCC)	13
UK Urban (Music Week)	1
US Billboard Hot 100	1
US Hot R&B/Hip-Hop Singles & Tracks (Billboard)	1
US Hot Rap Songs (Billboard)	1

2022 year-end chart performance for "In da Club"
Chart (2022)	Position
Global 200 (Billboard)	131

=== Decade-end charts ===
2000s decade-end chart performance for "In da Club"
Chart (2000–2009)	Position
Australia (ARIA)	55
US Billboard Hot 100	24
US Hot R&B/Hip-Hop Songs (Billboard)	30
US Hot Rap Songs (Billboard)	5

=== All-time charts ===
All-time chart performance for "In da Club"
Chart	Position
US Billboard Hot 100	153

== Certifications ==
Certifications and sales for "In da Club"
Region	Certification	Certified units/sales
Australia (ARIA)	10× Platinum	700,000^{‡}
Belgium (BRMA)	Gold	25,000^{*}
Brazil (Pro-Música Brasil)	2× Platinum	120,000^{‡}
Denmark (IFPI Danmark)	3× Platinum	270,000^{‡}
Germany (BVMI)	3× Platinum	900,000^{‡}
Italy (FIMI)	2× Platinum	200,000^{‡}
New Zealand (RMNZ)	7× Platinum	210,000^{‡}
Spain (Promusicae)	Platinum	60,000^{‡}
Sweden (GLF)	Gold	15,000^{^}
Switzerland (IFPI Switzerland)	Gold	20,000^{^}
United Kingdom (BPI)	4× Platinum	2,400,000^{‡}
United States (RIAA)	Diamond	10,000,000^{‡}
Ringtone
United States (RIAA) Mastertone	Gold	500,000^{*}
Streaming
Denmark (IFPI Danmark)	Gold	900,000^{†}
Greece (IFPI Greece)	3× Platinum	6,000,000^{†}
^{*} Sales figures based on certification alone.^{^} Shipments figures based on certification alone.^{‡} Sales+streaming figures based on certification alone.^{†} Streaming-only figures based on certification alone.

== Release history ==
Release dates and formats for "In da Club"
Region	Date	Format(s)	Label(s)	Ref.
United States	January 7, 2003	Digital download	Shady; Aftermath; Interscope	
United States	January 21, 2003	Rhythmic contemporary radio; urban contemporary radio	Shady; Aftermath; Interscope	
United States	February 4, 2003	12-inch vinyl	Shady; Aftermath; Interscope	
United States	February 18, 2003	Contemporary hit radio	Shady; Aftermath; Interscope	
United Kingdom	March 10, 2003	12-inch vinyl; cassette; maxi CD	Polydor	
Australia	March 17, 2003	Maxi CD	Universal Music	
Germany	March 17, 2003	CD	Universal Music	
France	April 1, 2003	CD; maxi CD	Polydor	

== See also ==
- List of number-one singles of 2003 (Australia)
- List of best-selling singles in Australia
- List of number-one singles of 2003 (Canada)
- List of number-one songs of the 2000s (Denmark)
- List of European number-one hits of 2003
- List of number-one hits of 2003 (Germany)
- List of number-one singles of 2003 (Ireland)
- List of number-one singles from the 2000s (New Zealand)
- List of number-one hits of 2003 (Switzerland)
- List of top 10 singles in 2003 (UK)
- List of Billboard Hot 100 number-one singles of 2003
- List of number-one R&B singles of 2003 (U.S.)
