= P.I.M.P. =

2003 single by 50 Cent

Single by 50 Cent

from the album Get Rich or Die Tryin'
- B-side: "8 More Miles"
- Released: June 24, 2003
- Recorded: 2003
- Genre: Gangsta rap
- Length: 4:09 (album version); 4:17 (radio edit)
- Label: Shady; Aftermath; Interscope
- Songwriters: Curtis Jackson; Denaun Porter
- Producer: Mr. Porter

50 Cent singles chronology
"Magic Stick" (2003)	"P.I.M.P." (2003)	"If I Can't" (2003)

"P.I.M.P." is a song recorded by American rapper 50 Cent for his debut studio album Get Rich or Die Tryin' (2003). It features production from Mr. Porter of D12 and was mixed by Dr. Dre. The song was released as the third single from Get Rich or Die Tryin' alongside its remix, featuring American rappers Snoop Dogg, Lloyd Banks and Young Buck, on June 24, 2003, by Interscope Records, Shady Records and Aftermath Entertainment.

Upon its release, "P.I.M.P." was a significant commercial success, especially in the United States, where it peaked at number three on the Billboard Hot 100, while reaching the top ten of numerous national charts worldwide. The song was later certified gold by the Recording Industry Association of America (RIAA). Although the remix was not originally part of the track listing for Get Rich or Die Tryin', it was later added as a bonus track on some digital editions of the album.

== Background ==
Prior to the success of D12's album Devil's Night, Mr. Porter had not been making any money from his production work, mostly offering them to D12 and associated groups like the Outsidaz. However, he decided to make a fresh batch of beats after an impressed Dr. Dre asked if he had any more, building a new studio in his basement and eventually providing Dr. Dre with a CD containing ten new instrumentals; Dr. Dre offered to buy seven of them, one of these being the instrumental which eventually became "P.I.M.P.".

Mr. Porter created the "P.I.M.P." instrumental with engineer Brandon Parrott, who was not credited for his co-production on the final record despite Mr. Porter's efforts to ensure he got it. In an interview with Complex, Mr. Porter suggested that 50 Cent had chosen the beat for Get Rich or Die Tryin' mistakenly believing it was a Dr. Dre production.

== Content ==
Musically, the song is based on a highly steelpan prominent production, and although it is predominantly a rap song, features elements of other genres, especially reggae, or music similar to that of the Caribbean. Lyrically, the song glorifies 50 Cent's supposed involvement in the 'pimp' lifestyle.

== Music video ==
The music video features the four rappers rapping with topless women. The video comes in two slightly different versions: one with the topless women and a "clean" version without. On July 15, 2003, the video debuted on MTV's Total Request Live at number nine and stayed on the chart for fifty days. At the 2004 MTV Video Music Awards, it was nominated for Best Rap Video, but lost to Jay-Z's "99 Problems".

The video had 50 Cent trying to audition to become a member of the P.I.M.P. Legion of Doom that is led by Snoop Dogg's character. When asked why they should let him join the P.I.M.P. Legion of Doom as he doesn't have a Cadillac and/or a perm, 50 Cent ends up winning their favor by showing off his Magic Stick.

The music video on YouTube has received over 665 million views as of June 2024.

== Samples and covers ==
In 2008, the Bacao Rhythm & Steel Band released a single "PIMP" from their album 55 (2016). It was such a faithful cover that many people incorrectly believed that it was the source of the steel drum melody used in the 50 Cent single, though the Bacao single was released five years after 50 Cent had released "P.I.M.P.". This cover features heavily in the French legal thriller Anatomy of a Fall.

Additional covers of the song include those on Hip Hop Baby (a 2004 compilation album of kid-friendly tunes from the group Tunes for Baby That Won't Drive You Crazy), and "P.I.N.T.", a parody version by British rapper 50 Pence (from his 2004 album 50 Pence Presents).

== Legal controversy ==
In June 2016, Parrott and business manager Erica Tucker sued almost everyone involved with the 50 Cent record Get Rich or Die Tryin', claiming that he was tricked into licensing the use of a beat from his track "BAMBA". Aftermath Records and Universal requested that the case be dismissed on the grounds that Parrott had already been compensated in an earlier settlement. Judge S. James Otero dismissed the complaint without leave to amend in November 2016.

== Sequel ==
During an interview with Vibe in December 2006, 50 Cent revealed that he had recorded a sequel to "P.I.M.P." − titled "P.I.M.P. Pt. 2" − for his second studio album The Massacre (2005): however, its inclusion was vetoed by Dr. Dre as he did not like it.

== Track listing ==
- UK CD single
1. "P.I.M.P." – 4:09
2. "P.I.M.P. (Remix)" (featuring Snoop Dogg, Lloyd Banks and Young Buck) – 4:47
3. "8 More Miles" (featuring G-Unit) – 3:08
4. "P.I.M.P." – The Video (Director's cut) – 4:10

== Charts ==
=== Weekly charts ===
Weekly chart performance for "P.I.M.P."
Chart (2003–2004)	Peak position
Australia (ARIA)	2
Australian Urban (ARIA)	1
Austria (Ö3 Austria Top 40)	12
Belgium (Ultratop 50 Flanders)	10
Belgium (Ultratop 50 Wallonia)	19
Canada (Canadian Singles Chart)	18
Canada CHR (Nielsen BDS)	13
Denmark (Tracklisten)	5
Finland (Suomen virallinen lista)	10
France (SNEP)	25
Germany (GfK)	5
Hungary (Rádiós Top 40)	7
Hungary (Dance Top 40)	3
Ireland (IRMA)	4
Italy (FIMI)	10
Latvia (Latvian Airplay Top 50)	19
Netherlands (Dutch Top 40)	8
Netherlands (Single Top 100)	8
New Zealand (Recorded Music NZ)	2
Norway (VG-lista)	4
Romania (Romanian Top 100)	2
Scottish Singles Sales (Official Charts)	5
Sweden (Sverigetopplistan)	8
Switzerland (Schweizer Hitparade)	4
UK Singles (Official Charts)	5
UK Hip Hop/R&B (Official Charts)	3
US Billboard Hot 100	3
US Hot R&B/Hip-Hop Songs (Billboard)	2
US Hot Rap Songs (Billboard)	1

2023 weekly chart performance for "P.I.M.P."
Chart (2023)	Peak position
Latvia Streaming (LaIPA)	19

2026 weekly chart performance for "P.I.M.P."
Chart (2026)	Peak position
Russia Streaming (TopHit)	100

=== Year-end charts ===
2003 year-end chart performance for "P.I.M.P."
Chart (2003)	Position
Australia (ARIA)	33
Belgium (Ultratop 50 Flanders)	82
Germany (Media Control GfK)	57
Ireland (IRMA)	59
Netherlands (Dutch Top 40)	65
Netherlands (Single Top 100)	48
Sweden (Hitlistan)	60
Switzerland (Schweizer Hitparade)	27
UK Singles (OCC)	104
UK Urban (Music Week)	12
US Billboard Hot 100	21
US Hot R&B/Hip-Hop Singles & Tracks (Billboard)	12

2004 year-end chart performance for "P.I.M.P."
Chart (2004)	Position
Switzerland (Schweizer Hitparade)	87

== Certifications ==
Certifications and sales for "P.I.M.P."
Region	Certification	Certified units/sales
Australia (ARIA)	Platinum	70,000^{^}
Brazil (Pro-Música Brasil)	Platinum	60,000^{‡}
Denmark (IFPI Danmark)	Platinum	90,000^{‡}
Germany (BVMI)	3× Gold	450,000^{‡}
Italy (FIMI)	Gold	25,000^{‡}
New Zealand (RMNZ)	4× Platinum	120,000^{‡}
Norway (IFPI Norway)	Gold	5,000^{*}
Spain (Promusicae)	Gold	30,000^{‡}
United Kingdom (BPI)	2× Platinum	1,200,000^{‡}
United States (RIAA)	3× Platinum	3,000,000^{‡}
Ringtone
United States (RIAA) Mastertone	Gold	500,000^{*}
Streaming
Greece (IFPI Greece)	Gold	1,000,000^{†}
^{*} Sales figures based on certification alone.^{^} Shipments figures based on certification alone.^{‡} Sales+streaming figures based on certification alone.^{†} Streaming-only figures based on certification alone.

== Release history ==
Release dates and formats for "P.I.M.P."
Region	Date	Format(s)	Label(s)	Ref.
United States	June 24, 2003	Urban contemporary radio	Interscope; Shady; Aftermath	
United States	July 1, 2003	12-inch vinyl	Interscope; Shady; Aftermath	
United States	July 15, 2003	Digital download	Interscope; Shady; Aftermath	
United States	August 5, 2003	Contemporary hit radio	Interscope; Shady; Aftermath	
Australia	September 29, 2003	Maxi CD	Universal Music	
Germany	September 29, 2003	Maxi CD	Universal Music	
United Kingdom	October 13, 2003	12-inch vinyl; cassette; maxi CD	Polydor	
France	December 16, 2003	CD	Polydor	
