= 21 Questions =

2003 single by 50 Cent

Single by 50 Cent featuring Nate Dogg

from the album Get Rich or Die Tryin'
- B-side: "Many Men (Wish Death)"; "Soldier"; "21 Answers"
- Released: March 4, 2003
- Genre: Hip hop; R&B
- Length: 3:44
- Label: Interscope; Shady; Aftermath; G-Unit
- Songwriters: Curtis Jackson; Nick Corrado; Kevin Risto; Jimmy Cameron; Vela M. Cameron
- Producer: Dirty Swift

50 Cent singles chronology
"In da Club" (2003)	"21 Questions" (2003)	"Magic Stick" (2003)

Nate Dogg singles chronology
"Get Up" (2003)	"21 Questions" (2003)	"Gangsta Nation" (2003)

Music video
- "21 Questions" on YouTube

"21 Questions" is a song by American rapper 50 Cent, featuring guest vocals from American singer Nate Dogg. Released in March 2003 through Interscope Records, Dr. Dre's Aftermath Entertainment, Eminem's Shady Records, and 50 Cent's own G-Unit Records as the second single from 50 Cent's debut studio album Get Rich or Die Tryin', it differs from his previous singles and most of the songs on the album by being an R&B-influenced love song, largely themed around a series of questions pertaining to a relationship between 50 Cent and an unnamed girlfriend, and contains elements of Barry White's 1978 song "It's Only Love Doing Its Thing".

"21 Questions" peaked at #1 on the US Billboard Hot 100 chart in May 2003, becoming the second consecutive chart-topping single for 50 Cent, following the album's lead single "In da Club", and the first for Nate Dogg. Overall, the song spent four consecutive weeks atop the Hot 100 and twenty-three weeks on the chart. It was also successful internationally, reaching the top ten in the Netherlands, New Zealand and the United Kingdom, and the top five in Canada and Australia.

== Background ==
When producer Dr. Dre worked with 50 Cent on his debut album, he objected to the song being included on the tracklist. According to 50 Cent:

"Dre was, like, 'How you goin' to be gangsta this and that and then put this sappy love song on?'"

50 Cent responded saying:

"I'm two people. I've always had to be two people since I was a kid, to get by. To me that's not diversity, it's necessity."

== Music video ==
Directed by Damon Johnson, Dr. Dre and Phillip Atwell in March 2003, the music video for "21 Questions" depicts 50 Cent being arrested and confined to prison, where he tries to keep in touch with his girlfriend, played by Meagan Good. In prison, he is constantly harassed by a rival inmate (Tyson Beckford). The video ends with a continuation of the beginning, showing 50 Cent and his girlfriend watching from their home as the police arrest Beckford instead; the prison scenes are revealed to be a hypothetical scenario imagined by a worried 50 Cent. The video has cameo appearances by Nate Dogg (who provides vocals on the chorus and the outro) and fellow G-Unit members Lloyd Banks and Young Buck as other inmates.

On April 15, 2003, the video debuted on MTV's Total Request Live at number six, reached number one two days later, and stayed on the chart for 50 days. It also reached number two on the MuchMusic video charts.

The music video on YouTube has received over 605 million views as of July 2024.

== Remixes ==
Official remixes of the single includes featured artists among the likes of Nate Dogg, Monica, Free and Lil' Mo, all of whom have either rapped or sung their own verses over the song's instrumentals.

=== "21 Answers" ===
"21 Answers"

Promotional single by Lil' Mo featuring Free

from the album Meet the Girl Next Door
- Released: 2003
- Recorded: 2003
- Genre: R&B; hip hop
- Length: 4:02
- Label: Elektra
- Songwriters: Curtis Jackson; Nick Corrado; Kevin Risto; Jimmy Cameron; Vela M. Cameron
- Producer: Dirty Swift of Midi Mafia

"21 Answers" is remix recorded by American singer and rapper Lil' Mo and former 106 & Park co-host Free, as an answer song to "21 Questions." Kevin "Dirty Swift" Risto, one-half of Midi Mafia, originally conceived the idea of creating a female response record; he immediately got in touch with Lil' Mo and added Free as a collaborator. The song subsequently premiered on New York's Hot 97 radio station—resulting in numerous rotations on various radio stations across the United States—and later debuted on the US Hot R&B/Hip-Hop Songs at number 77. Although the song went on to spend 11 weeks on the chart based solely on airplay, it failed to be included on Lil' Mo's second studio album Meet the Girl Next Door (2003), due to the song not being finalized in time to meet the album's deadline. However, because of Elektra Records' 2004 merging with Atlantic, the song appeared on the 2011 re-release of Meet the Girl Next Door.

==== Charts ====
Weekly chart performance for "21 Answers"
Chart (2003)	Peak position
US Hot R&B/Hip-Hop Songs (Billboard)	50

== Track listings ==
- UK CD single
1. "21 Questions" - 3:44
2. "Soldier (Freestyle with G-Unit) - 3:18
3. "21 Questions" (Live from New York) - 4:54
4. "21 Questions" (Music Video) - 3:49
- French CD single
1. "21 Questions" - 3:44
2. "21 Answers" (featuring Monica) - 4:03

== Credits and personnel ==
- Producer: Dirty Swift of Midi Mafia
- Mixed by: Dr. Dre
- Recorded by: Sha Money XL and Maurico "Veto" Iragorri
- Protool edits by: Carlise Young
- Assisted by: Ruben Rivera

== Charts ==
=== Weekly charts ===
Weekly chart performance for "21 Questions"
Chart (2003)	Peak position
Australia (ARIA)	4
Australian Urban (ARIA)	2
Austria (Ö3 Austria Top 40)	39
Belgium (Ultratop 50 Flanders)	37
Belgium (Ultratop 50 Wallonia)	36
Canada (Canadian Singles Chart)	5
Canada CHR (Nielsen BDS)	5
Denmark (Tracklisten)	18
Finland (Suomen virallinen lista)	20
France (SNEP)	58
Germany (GfK)	35
Hungary (Dance Top 40)	15
Ireland (IRMA)	11
Netherlands (Dutch Top 40)	8
Netherlands (Single Top 100)	7
New Zealand (Recorded Music NZ)	8
Norway (VG-lista)	15
Scottish Singles Sales (Official Charts)	8
Sweden (Sverigetopplistan)	34
Switzerland (Schweizer Hitparade)	14
UK Singles (Official Charts)	6
UK Hip Hop/R&B (Official Charts)	2
US Billboard Hot 100	1
US Hot R&B/Hip-Hop Songs (Billboard)	1
US Hot Rap Songs (Billboard)	1
US Pop Airplay (Billboard)	6

=== Year-end charts ===
Year-end chart performance for "21 Questions"
Chart (2003)	Position
Australia (ARIA)	44
Ireland (IRMA)	97
Netherlands (Dutch Top 40)	99
Netherlands (Single Top 100)	99
Switzerland (Schweizer Hitparade)	80
UK Singles (OCC)	129
UK Urban (Music Week)	6
US Billboard Hot 100	14
US Hot R&B/Hip-Hop Singles & Tracks (Billboard)	7

== Certifications ==
Certifications and sales for "21 Questions"
Region	Certification	Certified units/sales
Australia (ARIA)	Platinum	70,000^{^}
Brazil (Pro-Música Brasil)	Gold	30,000^{‡}
Denmark (IFPI Danmark)	Platinum	90,000^{‡}
Germany (BVMI)	Gold	150,000^{‡}
Spain (Promusicae)	Gold	30,000^{‡}
New Zealand (RMNZ)	5× Platinum	150,000^{‡}
United Kingdom (BPI)	2× Platinum	1,200,000^{‡}
United States (RIAA)	4× Platinum	4,000,000^{‡}
United States (RIAA) Mastertone	Gold	500,000^{*}
^{*} Sales figures based on certification alone.^{^} Shipments figures based on certification alone.^{‡} Sales+streaming figures based on certification alone.

== Release history ==
Release dates and formats for "21 Questions"
Region	Date	Format(s)	Label(s)	Ref.
United States	March 4, 2003	Digital download	Interscope; Shady; Aftermath	
United States	April 8, 2003	Rhythmic contemporary radio; urban contemporary radio	Interscope; Shady; Aftermath	
United States	May 13, 2003	12-inch vinyl	Interscope; Shady; Aftermath	
Germany	June 23, 2003	Maxi CD	Universal Music	
Australia	June 30, 2003	Maxi CD	Universal Music	
United Kingdom	June 30, 2003	12-inch vinyl; cassette; maxi CD	Polydor	
France	August 19, 2003	CD	Polydor	

== Myke Towers version ==
"Girl"

Single by Myke Towers

from the album Easy Money Baby
- Released: 23 January 2020
- Recorded: 2020
- Genre: Reggaeton
- Length: 3:10
- Label: Sony Latin
- Songwriters: Curtis Jackson; Nick Corrado; Kevin Risto; Jimmy Cameron; Vela M. Cameron

Myke Towers singles chronology
"Piensan" (2019)	"Girl" (2020)	"Diosa" (2020)

Music video
- "Girl" on YouTube

In 2020, Puerto Rican rapper/singer Myke Towers released a Spanish version of the song titled "Girl" for his album Easy Money Baby. His version is all in the same rhythm as the original but the message of the lyrics is different. His version entered the charts in the Hispanic market and was certified quintuple platinum in the United States.

=== Charts ===
Chart (2020)	Peak position
Spain (Promusicae)	28
US Hot Latin Songs (Billboard)	23

=== Certifications ===
Region	Certification	Certified units/sales
United States (RIAA)	5× Platinum (Latin)	300,000^{‡}
^{‡} Sales+streaming figures based on certification alone.
