= YoungBloodZ =

American Southern hip-hop duo

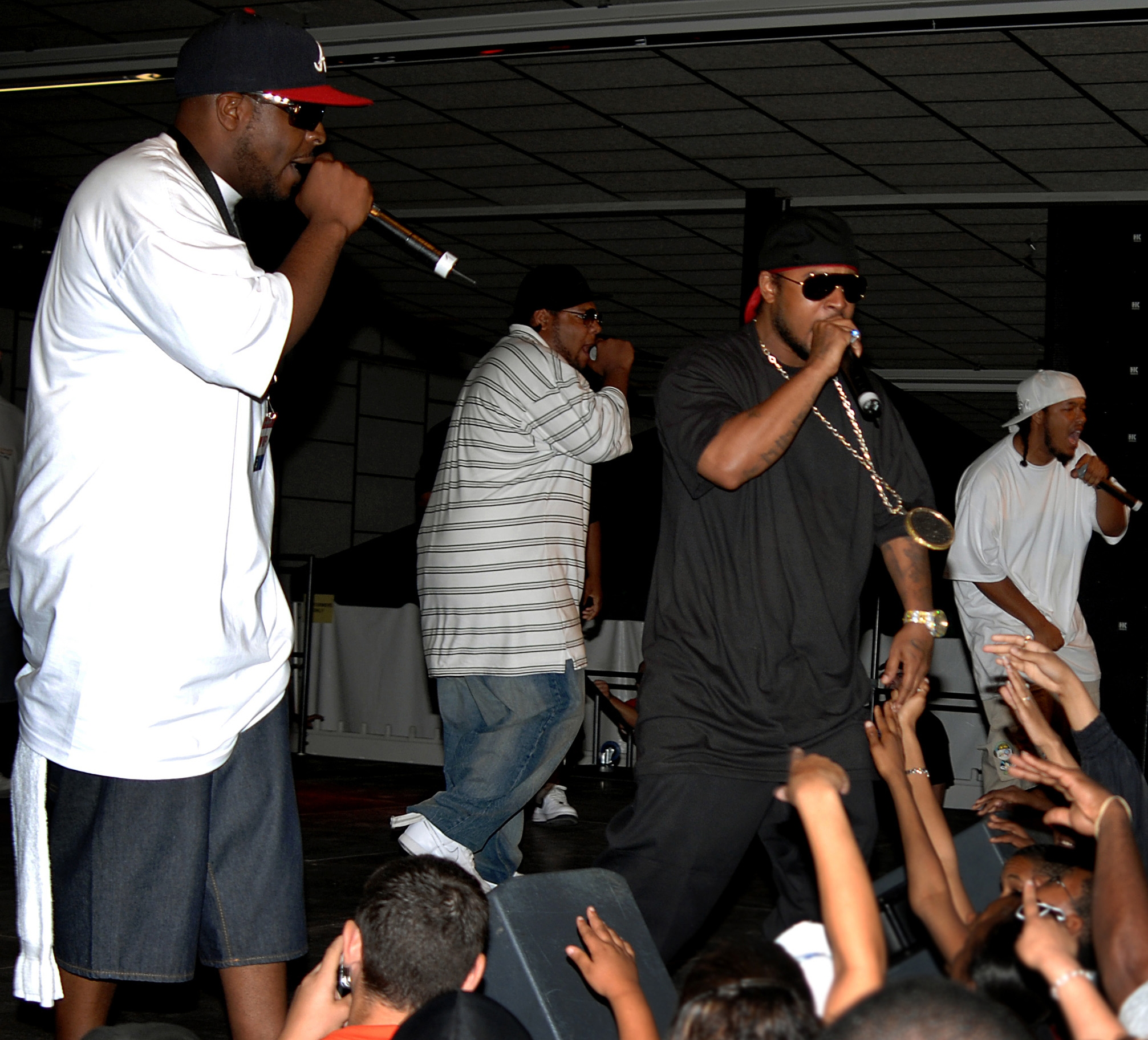
- YoungBloodZ performing in 2007

Background information
- Origin: Atlanta, Georgia, U.S.
- Genres: Southern hip-hop; crunk
- Years active: 1997–2008; 2014–present
- Labels: YBZ Music Group; So So Def; LaFace; Arista
- Members: Sean Paul "Sean P" Joseph; Jeffrey "J-Bo" Grigsby

YoungBloodZ is an American Southern hip-hop duo from Atlanta, Georgia composed of J-Bo and Sean Paul (later stylized as Sean P) formed in 1997. The duo were discovered by Kawan Prather and signed with his company Ghet-O-Vision, an imprint of LaFace Records to release their debut studio album, Against Da Grain (1999). Their second album, Drankin' Patnaz (2003), peaked at number five on the Billboard 200 and spawned the single "Damn!" (featuring Lil Jon), which peaked at number four on the Billboard Hot 100. The duo's third album, Ev'rybody Know Me (2005), was released by LaFace and Zomba. YoungBloodZ are one of many commercially successful Atlanta-based hip hop acts.

== Career ==
J-Bo and Sean Paul met at Decatur's Miller Grove Middle School, where they started the Attic Crew with some friends.

Their debut album was Against Da Grain, released in 1999 on LaFace. The duo are best known for singles like "U-Way" (1999) and "85" (2000), which featured Big Boi. After a 3-year absence, they returned with Cadillac Pimpin' in 2003, scoring a moderate hit. The duo's sophomore effort featured Grammy-nominated single "Damn!", reaching No. 4 on the Billboard Hot 100 and becoming their only top 10 hit. It was produced by Lil Jon.

YoungBloodZ released Ev'rybody Know Me in 2005. It featured guest vocals from Young Buck and another Lil Jon-produced hit "Presidential" and production by Scott Storch. Their song "I'mma Shine" was featured in the 2006 film Step Up and on its soundtrack.

YoungBloodZ has made many appearances in a number of hit singles including Cherish's "Do It to It", Sammie's "You Should Be My Girl", both produced by Jazze Pha. Sean P appeared on the Billboard R&B/Hip-Hop number one song "Snap Yo Fingers" by Lil Jon featuring E-40. YoungBloodz have also been featured in songs with T.I., Nelly, Gucci Mane, Lil Scrappy, Twista, DJ Khaled and T-Pain. The group are working on a new album Back From the Liquor Sto, that is scheduled for release soon. The first official singles from the EP are entitled "Foolish" and "She Drank, She Smoke" both produced by Rawbeatzz.

== Legal issues ==
YoungBloodZ were arrested on June 1, 2006, on drugs and weapons charges in Atlanta after a traffic stop involving a tour bus with an expired license plate. All charges were eventually dropped and subsequently the driver was charged. J-Bo and Sean P never had any trouble with the law before this arrest.

== Discography ==
Studio albums

- Against da Grain (1999)
- Drankin' Patnaz (2003)
- Ev'rybody Know Me (2005)

Solo albums

- Sean P - Hood Anthems (2007)
- J-Bo - Atl's Finest (2008)
