= List of awards and nominations received by R. Kelly =

R. Kelly awards and nominations
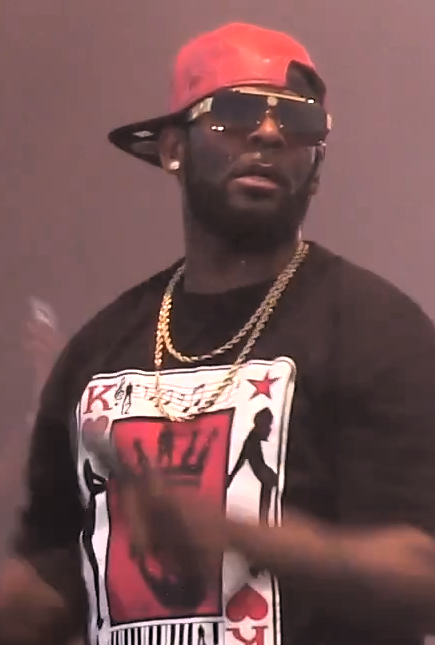
Awards and nominations
Award	Wins	Nominations
American Music Awards	2	11
BET	1	7
Billboard	12	15
Grammy	3	26
MOBO	1	3
MTV VMA	0	7
Soul Train	11	29
BMI Awards	19	19
NAACP Image Awards	6	8
Source Hip Hop Awards	3	5
Vibe Awards	3	9

Totals (Note: Certain award groups do not simply award one winner. They acknowledge several different recipients, have runners-up, and have third place. Since this is a specific recognition and is different from losing an award, runner-up mentions are considered wins in this award tally. For simplification and to avoid errors, each award in this list has been presumed to have had a prior nomination.)
- Wins: 110
- Nominations: 274

This is a comprehensive list of awards and nominations won by American recording artist R. Kelly. His awards are predominantly in R&B and hip-hop genre categories. Over the course of 25 years, Kelly has won a total of 110 awards from 274 nominations.

== American Music Awards ==
Created by Dick Clark in 1973, the American Music Awards is an annual music awards ceremony, and one of several major annual American music awards shows.

Year	Recipient	Award	Result
1993	"Honey Love"	Favorite Soul/R&B Single	Nominated
1995	12 Play	Favorite Soul/R&B Album	Nominated
1997	R. Kelly	Favorite Soul/R&B Male Artist	Nominated
2000	R. Kelly	Favorite Soul/R&B Male Artist	Won
2002	R. Kelly	Favorite Pop/Rock Male Artist	Nominated
2002	R. Kelly	Favorite Soul/R&B Male Artist	Nominated
2003	R. Kelly	Favorite Soul/R&B Male Artist	Nominated
2003	Chocolate Factory	Favorite Soul/R&B Album	Nominated
2004	R. Kelly	Favorite Soul/R&B Male Artist	Nominated
2005	R. Kelly	Favorite Soul/R&B Male Artist	Won
2007	Double Up	Favorite Soul/R&B Album	Nominated

== BET Awards ==
The BET Awards were established in 2001 by the Black Entertainment Television (BET) network to celebrate African Americans and other minorities in music, acting, sports and other fields of entertainment. The awards are presented annually and broadcast live on BET.

Year	Recipient	Award	Result
2001	R. Kelly	Best Male R&B Artist	Nominated
2001	R. Kelly	BET Award for Viewer's Choice	Nominated
2003	R. Kelly	Best Male R&B Artist	Won
2003	R. Kelly	BET Award for Viewer's Choice	Nominated
2004	R. Kelly	Best Male R&B Artist	Nominated
2006	Trapped in the Closet	Video of the Year	Nominated
2011	R. Kelly	Centric Award	Nominated

== Billboard Awards ==
The Billboard Music Awards is an honor that began in 1989 given by Billboard, a publication and music popularity chart covering the music business.

Year	Recipient	Award	Result
1994	R. Kelly	Number One R&B Producer	Won
1994	R. Kelly	R&B Artist of the Year	Won
1996	R. Kelly	Top R&B Artist	Won
1996	"Down Low (Nobody Has to Know)"	Top R&B Song	Nominated
1999	R. Kelly	Top Male Artist	Nominated
1999	R. Kelly	Top R&B Album Artist	Nominated
1999	"Fortunate" (As songwriter)	R&B Single of the Year	Won
1999	R. Kelly	Top R&B Artist	Won
2001	R. Kelly	Top R&B/Hip Hop Artist	Won
2001	TP-2.com	Top R&B/Hip Hop Album	Won
2001	"Fiesta"	Top R&B/Hip Hop Single & Tracks	Won
2001	"R. Kelly"	Top R&B/Hip Hop Artist - Male	Won
2001	"R. Kelly"	Top R&B/Hip Hop Album Artist	Won
2001	"R. Kelly"	Top R&B/Hip Hop Album Artist - Male	Won
2003	"Ignition (Remix)"	Best Hip-Hop/R&B Single	Won

=== Billboard R&B/Hip Hop Awards ===
Year	Recipient	Award	Result
2001	R. Kelly	R&B/Hip-Hop Songwriter of the Year	Won
2004	R. Kelly	Top R&B /Hip-hop Albums Artist	Nominated
2004	"Step in the Name of Love"	Top R&B/Hip-hop Singles	Won
2004	"Step in the Name of Love"	Top R&B/Hip-hop Singles - Airplay	Won
2004	R. Kelly	Top R&B/Hip-hop Artist	Won
2004	R. Kelly	Top R&B/Hip-hop Artist - Male	Won
2004	R. Kelly	Top R&B/Hip-hop Singles Artist	Won
2004	R. Kelly	Top Songwriters	Won
2004	R. Kelly	Top Producers	Won
2005	R. Kelly	Top Songwriters	Nominated
2006	"In the Kitchen"	Hot R&B/Hip-Hop Songs Sales	Nominated
2006	R. Kelly	Top R&B/Hip-Hop Songwriter	Nominated

=== Billboard.com's Readers Poll ===
Year	Recipient	Award	Result
2013	"Do What U Want" (Lady Gaga ft. R. Kelly)	Best Collaboration	Won

=== Billboard End of Year Chart Awards ===
This award is based on U.S. sales and airplay on music. A nomination means that it is in the top five or three that year.

Year	Nominee / work	Award	Result
1994	R. Kelly	Top Hot 100 Singles Artist - Male	Won
1994	R. Kelly	Top R&B/Hip Artist	Won
1994	R. Kelly	Top R&B/Hip Hop Artist - Male	Won
1994	R. Kelly	Top R&B/Hip Hop Album Artist - Male	Won
1994	R. Kelly	Top R&B/Hip Hop Album Artist	Nominated
1994	R. Kelly	Top R&B/Hip Hop Singles Artist - Male	Won
1994	R. Kelly	Top Pop Artist	Nominated
1994	R. Kelly	Top Billboard 200 Album Artist - Male	Nominated
1994	R. Kelly	Top Hot Dance Music Maxi-Singles Sales Artist	Nominated
1994	R. Kelly	Top Singles Artist - Male	Won
1994	R. Kelly	Top Pop Artist - Male	Won
1994	12 Play	Top R&B/Hip Album	Nominated
1994	Bump N' Grind	Top Singles Sales	Nominated
1994	Bump N' Grind	Top R&B/Hip Hop Singles	Won
1994	Bump N' Grind	Top R&B/Hip Hop Singles Sales	Nominated
1994	Bump N' Grind	Top R&B/Hip Hop Airplay	Nominated
1994	Your Body's Callin'	Top R&B/Hip Hop Airplay	Won
1994	Back And Forth (As songwriter)	Top R&B/Hip Hop Airplay	Nominated
1994	Back And Forth (As songwriter)	Top R&B/Hip Hop Singles	Nominated
1994	Back And Forth (As songwriter)	Top R&B/Hip Hop Singles Sales	Nominated
1996	R. Kelly	Top Album Artist - Male	Nominated
1996	R. Kelly	Top Singles Artist - Male	Nominated
1996	R. Kelly	Top Singles Songwriter - Male	Nominated
1996	R. Kelly	Top R&B/Hip Hop Artist	Won
1996	R. Kelly	Top R&B/Hip Hop Artist - Male	Won
1996	R. Kelly	Top R&B/Hip Hop Album Artist	Nominated
1996	R. Kelly	Top R&B/Hip Hop Album Artist - Male	Nominated
1996	R. Kelly	Top R&B/Hip Hop Singles Artist	Nominated
1996	R. Kelly	Top R&B/Hip Hop Singles Artist - Male	Nominated
1996	R. Kelly	Top R&B/Hip Hop Producers	Nominated
1996	R. Kelly	Top R&B/Hip Hop Songwriters	Nominated
1996	Down Low (Nobody Has To Know)	Top R&B/Hip Hop Singles Sales	Nominated
1996	Down Low (Nobody Has To Know)	Top R&B/Hip Hop Singles Airplay	Nominated
1996	Down Low (Nobody Has To Know)	Hot Dance Music Maxi- Singles Sales	Nominated
1997	R. Kelly	Top Singles Artist - Male	Nominated
1997	R. Kelly	Top R&B/Hip Hop Singles Artist - Male	Nominated
1997	I Believe I Can Fly	Top Singles Sales	Nominated
1997	I Believe I Can Fly	Top R&B/Hip Hop Singles Sales	Nominated
1997	I Believe I Can Fly	Top Soundtrack Singles	Won
1997	G.H.E.T.T.O.U.T. (As songwriter)	Top R&B/Hip Singles & Tracks	Nominated
1997	G.H.E.T.T.O.U.T. (As songwriter)	Top R&B/Hip Songs Airplay	Nominated
1999	R. Kelly	Top Pop Artist - Male	Nominated
1999	R. Kelly	Top Singles Artist - Male	Nominated
1999	R. Kelly	Top Singles Songwriter	Won
1999	R. Kelly	Top Singles Producer	Nominated
1999	R. Kelly	Top R&B/Hip Hop Singles Songwriter	Won
1999	R. Kelly	Top R&B/Hip Hop Singles Producer	Won
1999	R. Kelly	Top R&B/Hip Hop Artist	Won
1999	R. Kelly	Top R&B/Hip Hop Artist - Male	Won
1999	R. Kelly	Top R&B/Hip Hop Album Artist	Nominated
1999	R. Kelly	Top R&B/Hip Hop Album Artist - Male	Nominated
1999	R. Kelly	Top R&B/Hip Hop Singles & Tracks Artist	Nominated
1999	R. Kelly	Top R&B/Hip Hop Singles & Tracks Artist - Male	Won
1999	I'm Your Angel (With Celine Dion)	Top Singles Sales	Nominated
1999	R.	Top R&B/Hip Hop Album	Nominated
1999	Fortunate (As songwriter)	Top R&B/Hip Hop Singles & Tracks	Won
1999	Fortunate (As songwriter)	Top R&B/Hip Hop Singles Sales	Nominated
1999	Fortunate (As songwriter)	Top R&B/Hip Hop Singles & Tracks Airplay	Won
1999	Fortunate (As songwriter)	Top Soundtrack Singles	Nominated
2001	R. Kelly	Top R&B/Hip Hop Artist	Won
2001	R. Kelly	Top R&B/Hip Hop Artist - Male	Won
2001	R. Kelly	Top R&B/Hip Hop Album Artist	Won
2001	R. Kelly	Top R&B/Hip Hop Album Artist - Male	Won
2001	TP-2.com	Top R&B/Hip Hop Album	Won
2001	Fiesta	Top R&B/Hip Hop Singles & Tracks	Won
2003	R. Kelly	Top Pop Artist	Nominated
2003	R. Kelly	Top Pop Artist - Male	Nominated
2003	R. Kelly	Top Album Artist - Male	Nominated
2003	R. Kelly	Top Singles Artist	Nominated
2003	R. Kelly	Top Singles Artist - Male	Nominated
2003	R. Kelly	Top R&B/Hip Hop Artist	Nominated
2003	R. Kelly	Top R&B/Hip Hop Artist - Male	Nominated
2003	R. Kelly	Top R&B/Hip Hop Album Artist	Nominated
2003	R. Kelly	Top R&B/Hip Hop Album Artist - Male	Nominated
2003	R. Kelly	Top R&B/Hip Hop Singles & Tracks Artist	Nominated
2003	R. Kelly	Top R&B/Hip Hop Singles & Tracks Artist - Male	Nominated
2003	R. Kelly	Top R&B/Hip Hop Producer	Won
2003	R. Kelly	Top R&B/Hip Hop Songwriter	Won
2003	R. Kelly	Top Producer	Won
2003	R. Kelly	Top Songwriter	Won
2003	Ignition (Remix)	Top Singles & Tracks	Nominated
2003	Ignition (Remix)	Top Airplay Tracks	Nominated
2003	Ignition (Remix)	Top R&B/Hip Hop Singles & Track	Nominated
2003	Ignition (Remix)	Top R&B/Hip Hop Singles Sales	Nominated
2003	Ignition (Remix)	Top R&B/Hip Hop Airplay	Nominated
2004	R. Kelly	Top R&B/Hip Hop Artist	Nominated
2004	R. Kelly	Top R&B/Hip Hop Artist - Male	Nominated
2004	R. Kelly	Top R&B/Hip Hop Album Artist	Nominated
2004	R. Kelly	Top R&B/Hip Hop Album Artist - Male	Nominated
2004	R. Kelly	Top R&B/Hip Hop Singles & Tracks Artist	Nominated
2004	R. Kelly	Top R&B/Hip Hop Singles & Tracks Artist - Male	Nominated
2005	In The Kitchen/Trapped in the Closet	Top R&B/Hip Hop Song Sales	Nominated

== BMI Awards ==
Year	Recipient	Award	Result
1998	R. Kelly	Pop Songwriter of the Year	Won
2000	"I'm Your Angel"	Most Performed Songs	Won
2015	"Do What U Want" FT. Lady Gaga	Most Performed Songs	Won

=== BMI Film & TV Awards ===
Year	Recipient	Award	Result
2000	"Fortunate" (as songwriter)	Most Performed Song from a Film	Won

=== BMI Urban Awards ===
Broadcast Music, Inc. (BMI) is one of three U.S. performing rights organizations, along with ASCAP and SESAC. It collects license fees on behalf of songwriters, composers, and music publishers, and distributes them as royalties to those members whose works have been performed. In 2012, BMI collected $898.7 million in licensing fees and distributed $749.8 million in royalties.

Year	Recipient	Award	Result
2001	I Wish	Most-Performed Song	Won
2002	R. Kelly	Songwriters of the Year	Won
2002	R. Kelly	Top Producer	Won
2002	Contagious	Most-Performed Song	Won
2002	Fiesta (Remix)	Most-Performed Song	Won
2003	R. Kelly	Top 10 Songwriter/Producer	Won
2004	"Ignition (Remix)"	Song of the Year	Won
2004	R. Kelly	Producer of the Year	Won
2005	R. Kelly	Songwriters of the Year	Won
2005	R. Kelly	Producer of the Year	Won
2005	Gigolo (Nick Cannon ft. R. Kelly)	Most-Performed Song	Won
2005	Hotel (Cassidy ft. R. Kelly)	Most-Performed Song	Won
2005	Step in the Name of Love	Most-Performed Song	Won
2005	Thoia Thoing	Most-Performed Song	Won
2010	R. Kelly	Top Producer	Won

== ECHO Awards, Germany ==
Year	Recipient	Award	Result
2008	R. Kelly	International Hip-Hop/R&B Artist	Nominated

== Black Real Awards ==
Year	Recipient	Award	Result
2001	"Bad Man"	Best Song From a Film	Nominated
2002	"The World's Greatest"	Best Song From a Film	Won
2013	"Celebrate" (As songwriter)	Best Original or Adapted Song.	Nominated

== Chicago Music Awards ==
Year	Recipient	Award	Result
2013	R. Kelly	Pop Superstar of the Year	Won

== Grammy Awards ==
The Grammy Awards are awarded annually by the National Academy of Recording Arts and Sciences. Kelly has won three awards from 26 nominations. "Lean On Me" by Kirk Franklin, which features Kelly, has been nominated for three awards, only one is featured; the other two (Song of The Year and Best R&B Song) are for the songwriter Franklin. Other songs that Kelly has worked on, written and that have been nominated for a Grammy are: Best Pop Vocal Performance ("You Are Not Alone"), Best R&B Male Vocalist ("Fortunate" and "When You Call On Me").

Year	Nominee / work	Award	Result
1996	"You Are Not Alone" (Michael Jackson's song)	Song of the Year	Nominated
1996	HIStory: Past, Present and Future, Book I (as producer)	Album of the Year	Nominated
1998	"I Believe I Can Fly"	Record of the Year	Nominated
1998	"I Believe I Can Fly"	Song of the Year	Nominated
1998	"I Believe I Can Fly"	Best Male R&B Vocal Performance	Won
1998	"I Believe I Can Fly"	Best R&B Song	Won
1998	"I Believe I Can Fly"	Best Song Written for a Motion Picture, Television or Other Visual Media	Won
1999	"I'm Your Angel" (with Celine Dion)	Best Pop Collaboration with Vocals	Nominated
1999	"Lean On Me" (with Kirk Franklin, Mary J. Blige, Crystal Lewis, & Bono)	Best R&B Vocal Performance by a Duo or Group	Nominated
2000	"When a Woman's Fed Up"	Best Male R&B Vocal Performance	Nominated
2000	R.	Best R&B Album	Nominated
2000	"Satisfy You" (with Puff Daddy)	Best Rap Performance by a Duo or Group	Nominated
2001	"I Wish"	Best Male R&B Vocal Performance	Nominated
2003	"The World's Greatest"	Best Male R&B Vocal Performance	Nominated
2004	"Step in the Name of Love"	Best Male R&B Vocal Performance	Nominated
2004	Chocolate Factory	Best Contemporary R&B Album	Nominated
2005	"Happy People"	Best Male R&B Vocal Performance	Nominated
2006	Trapped in the Closet Chapters 1–12	Best Long Form Music Video	Nominated
2008	"Same Girl" (with Usher)	Best R&B Performance by a Duo or Group with Vocals	Nominated
2008	Trapped in the Closet Chapters 13–22	Best Long Form Music Video	Nominated
2011	"When a Woman Loves"	Best Traditional R&B Vocal Performance	Nominated
2011	Untitled	Best Contemporary R&B Album	Nominated
2012	"Radio Message"	Best Traditional R&B Performance	Nominated
2012	Love Letter	Best R&B Album	Nominated
2013	Write Me Back	Best R&B Album	Nominated
2015	"It's Your World" (with Jennifer Hudson)	Best R&B Performance	Nominated

== International Dance Music Awards ==
Year	Recipient	Award	Result
2004	Step In The Name Of Love	Best R&B/Urban Dance Track	Nominated
2005	Happy People	Best R&B/Urban Dance Track	Nominated

== MOBO Awards ==
The Music of Black Origin (MOBO) Awards were established in 1996 by Kanya King. They are held annually in the United Kingdom to recognize artists of any race or nationality performing music of black origin.

Year	Recipient	Award	Result
2001	R. Kelly	MOBO Outstanding Achievement	Won
2003	Ignition (Remix)	Best single	Nominated
2004	R. Kelly	Best Producer	Nominated

== MTV Awards ==
=== MTV Movie Awards ===
Year	Recipient	Award	Result
1997	"I Believe I Can Fly"	Best Movie Song	Nominated

=== MTV Video Music Awards ===
Year	Recipient	Award	Result
1994	"Bump n' Grind"	Best R&B Video	Nominated
1996	"Down Low (Nobody Has to Know)" (ft. Ernie Isley & Ronald Isley)	Best Male Video	Nominated
1996	"I Believe I Can Fly"	Best Male Video	Nominated
1996	"I Believe I Can Fly"	Best Video from a Film	Nominated
2001	"I Wish"	Best R&B Video	Nominated
2003	"Ignition (Remix)"	Best R&B Video	Nominated
2004	"Step in the Name of Love (Remix)"	Best R&B Video	Nominated

=== MTV Europe Music Awards ===
Year	Recipient	Award	Result
1997	R. Kelly	Best R&B	Nominated

=== MTV Australia Video Music Awards ===
Year	Recipient	Award	Result
2007	"That's That" (Snoop Dogg ft. R. Kelly)	Best Hip Hop Video	Won

== NAACP Image Awards ==
The NAACP Image Awards is an award ceremony from the National Association for the Advancement of Colored People.

Year	Recipient	Award	Result
1998	"I Believe I Can Fly"	Outstanding Song	Won
1998	"I Believe I Can Fly"	Outstanding Music Video	Won
1999	"Lean On Me" (Kirk Franklin ft. R. Kelly, Mary J Blige, Bono, Crystal Lewis & The Family)	Outstanding Song	Won
2000	"If I Could Turn Back the Hands of Time"	Outstanding Music Video	Nominated
2001	R. Kelly	Outstanding Male Artist	Won
2001	"I Wish"	Outstanding Music Video	Won
2004	"Chocolate Factory"	Outstanding Album	Nominated
2013	"I Look to You" (Duet with Whitney Houston)	Outstanding Song	Won

== Soul Train Music Awards ==
The Soul Train Music Awards is an annual award show aired in national broadcast syndication that honors the best in African American music and entertainment, established in 1987. No other artist has been nominated for more Soul Train awards than Kelly.

Year	Recipient	Award	Result
1995	"Bump n' Grind"	R&B/Soul or Rap Song of the Year	Nominated
1995	Bump N' Grind	Best R&B/Soul Single - Male	Nominated
1995	Age Ain't Nothing But A Number (As songwriter)	R&B/Soul Album of the Year - Female	Nominated
1997	R. Kelly	R&B/Soul or Rap Album of the Year	Nominated
1997	R. Kelly	Best R&B/Soul Album, Male	Nominated
1998	"I Believe I Can Fly"	Best R&B/Soul Single - Male	Nominated
1999	R.	Best R&B/Soul Album, Male	Won
1999	"Lean On Me"	Best R&B/Soul Single - Male	Nominated
1999	"Half on a Baby"	Best R&B/Soul Single - Male	Nominated
1999	R. Kelly	Sammy Davis Jr. Entertainer of the Year Award	Won
2000	R.	Best R&B/Soul or Rap Album	Won
2000	Fortunate (As songwriter)	Best R&B/Soul Single, Male	Won
2001	"I Wish"	Best R&B/Soul Single, Male	Won
2001	TP-2.com	R&B/Soul or Rap Album of the Year	Nominated
2001	TP-2.com	Best R&B/Soul Album, Male	Won
2002	"Contagious" (As songwriter)	Best R&B/Soul Single, Group, Band or Duo	Won
2003	The Best of Both Worlds	Best R&B/Soul Album - Group, Band or Duo	Nominated
2003	Bump, Bump, Bump (As songwriter)	Best R&B/Soul Single - Group, Band or Duo	Won
2004	Chocolate Factory	R&B/Soul Album, Male	Won
2004	Chocolate Factory	Best Album of the Year	Nominated
2004	R. Kelly	Quincy Jones Award for Outstanding Career Achievements	Won
2005	Happy People/U Saved Me	Best R&B/Soul Album - Male	Nominated
2006	R. Kelly	Stevie Wonder Award for Outstanding Achievements in Song Writing	Won
2006	Trapped in the Closet	The Michael Jackson Award for Best R&B/Soul or Rap Music Video	Nominated
2006	Trapped in the Closet	Best R&B/Soul Single, Male	Nominated
2006	TP.3 Reloaded	Best R&B/Soul Album, Male	Nominated
2010	"When a Woman Loves"	Record of the Year (Songwriter's Award)	Nominated
2012	Write Me Back	Album of the Year	Nominated
2012	"Share My Love"	Record of the Year (The Ashford & Simpson Songwriter's Award)	Nominated

== The Source Hip Hop Awards ==
Year	Recipient	Award	Result
1999	R. Kelly	R&B Artist of the Year	Won
2001	R. Kelly	R&B Artist of the Year	Won
2003	R. Kelly	R&B Artist of the Year	Won
2004	R. Kelly	R&B Artist of the Year	Nominated
2004	Hotel (With Cassidy)	Best R&B/Rap Collaboration	Nominated

== Vibe Awards ==
In 2013, Kely was named the number one musical genius since 1993 by Vibe.

Year	Recipient	Award	Result
2003	R. Kelly	R&B Vanguard Award	Won
2003	R. Kelly	Artist of the Year	Nominated
2004	Hotel (Cassidy ft. R. Kelly)	Coolest Collabo	Nominated
2004	R. Kelly	R&B Voice Of The Year	Nominated
2005	Trapped in the Closet (Chapter 1-5)	Reelest Video	Won
2007	R. Kelly	R&B Artist of the year	Nominated
2007	Same Girl (Duet with Usher)	Best Collaboration	Nominated
2007	Same Girl (Duet with Usher)	Video of the year	Nominated
2013	R. Kelly	Greatest Genius Since 93'	Won

== Blockbuster Entertainment Awards ==
Year	Recipient	Award	Result
1999	Fortunate (As songwriter)	Favorite Song	Nominated
2001	R. Kelly	Favorite Male Artist - R&B	Nominated

== Stellar Awards ==
Year	Recipient	Award	Result
2000	"Lean On Me" (Kirk Franklin ft. R. Kelly, Mary J Blige, Bono, Crystal Lewis & The Family)	Song of the Year	Won
2000	"Lean On Me" (Kirk Franklin ft. R. Kelly, Mary J Blige, Bono, Crystal Lewis & The Family)	Music Video of the Year	Won

== Ozone Awards ==
Year	Recipient	Award	Result
2007	Go Getta (Young Jeezy ft. R. Kelly)	Best Rap/R&B Collaboration	Nominated
2008	Speedin (Rick Ross ft. R. Kelly)	Best Rap/R&B Collaboration	Nominated
2008	Speedin (Rick Ross ft. R. Kelly)	Best Video	Nominated

== Dove Awards ==
Year	Recipient	Award	Result
2002	I Believe I Can Fly	Urban Recorded Song of the Year	Nominated
2002	I Believe I Can Fly	Contemporary Gospel Recorded Song of the Year	Nominated

== Whudat Music Awards ==
Year	Recipient	Award	Result
2004	Chocolate Factory	R&B Album of the Year	Won
2004	"Step in the Name of Love"	R&B Single of the Year	Won

== MuchMusic Video Awards ==
Year	Recipient	Award	Result
1999	"I'm Your Angel"	MuchMoreMusic Award	Nominated

== World Music Awards ==
The World Music Award is an international awards show founded in 1989, that annually honors recording artists based on worldwide sales figures provided by the International Federation of the Phonographic Industry (IFPI).

Year	Recipient	Award	Result
2005	R. Kelly	World's Best Selling R&B Artist	Nominated
2014	"Do What U Want"	World's Best Song	Nominated
2014	"PYD"	World's Best Song	Nominated
2014	Black Panties	World's Best Album	Nominated
2014	R. Kelly	World's Best Male Artist	Nominated
2014	R. Kelly	World's Best Entertainer of the Year	Nominated

== Hong Kong Hit Radio Awards ==
Year	Recipient	Award	Result
1996	"You Are Not Alone" (as songwriter)	Best Song of the Year	Won

== Guinness Book of World Records ==
Year	Recipient	Award	Result
1995	"You Are Not Alone" (as songwriter)	First Song to Debut the US Single Chart at Number One	Won

== Rescinded awards ==
Rescinded awards due to allegations and convictions of sex trafficking:

2013: Key to the City of Baton Rouge, Louisiana. Revoked September 30, 2021.
