= The R. in R&B Collection, Vol. 1 =

Greatest hits album by R. Kelly
- Released: September 23, 2003
- Recorded: 1991–2003
- Label: Jive
- Producer: R. Kelly; Wyclef Jean; Jerry "Wonder" Duplessis; Poke & Tone; G-One; Precision; Timmy Allen

R. Kelly chronology
Chocolate Factory (2003)	The R. in R&B Collection, Vol. 1 (2003)	Happy People/U Saved Me (2004)

Singles from The R. in R&B Collection Vol. 1
- 1. "Thoia Thoing" Released: May 9, 2003; 2. "Ghetto Religion" Released: September 22, 2003

The R. in R&B Collection, Vol. 1 is the first compilation album released by American R&B singer R. Kelly. The album has sold more than 3 million copies in the United States and 907,680 copies in United Kingdom.

== Critical reception ==
Professional ratings
Review scores
Source	Rating
AllMusic	4/5 stars
Rolling Stone	4/5 stars

AllMusic editor Alex Henderson found that Vol. 1 "isn't the last word on Kelly's output; some major hits are missing, and the Vol. 1 part of the title implies that a Vol. 2 is needed. But for the novice or casual listener who wants to have many of Kelly's hits in the same place, Vol. 1 serves its purpose nicely." In his review for Rolling Stone, Jon Caramanica wrote: "If only you could separate the music from the man. In an era of hip-hop excess, Chicago's R. Kelly held a torch for vintage soul, updated for the streets [...] In light of Kelly's legal troubles, though, listening to his more provocative material – and most of it is just that – can be grueling."

== Track listing ==
The R. in R&B Collection Vol.1 – U.S. edition
No.	Title	Writer(s)	Original album	Length
1.	"Bump N' Grind" (LP version)	Robert Kelly	12 Play	4:16
2.	"Your Body's Callin'"	Robert Kelly	12 Play	4:35
3.	"Sex Me, Pt. I" (radio edit)	Robert Kelly	12 Play	4:18
4.	"You Remind Me of Something"	Robert Kelly, Mario Winans	R. Kelly	4:10
5.	"Ignition (Remix)" (single version)	Robert Kelly	Chocolate Factory	3:08
6.	"Down Low (Nobody Has to Know)" (radio edit) (featuring The Isley Brothers)	Robert Kelly	R. Kelly	4:24
7.	"When a Woman's Fed Up"	Robert Kelly	R.	4:38
8.	"Step in the Name of Love (Remix)"	Robert Kelly	Chocolate Factory	7:09
9.	"Thoia Thoing"	Robert Kelly	previously unreleased	3:42
10.	"Touched a Dream"		previously unreleased	4:10
11.	"Fiesta (Remix)" (featuring Jay-Z and Boo & Gotti)	Robert Kelly, Shawn Carter, Samuel Barnes, Jean-Claude Olivier, Larry Gates, Pavlo Simtikidis	TP-2.com	4:00
12.	"I Wish" (radio edit)	Robert Kelly	TP-2.com	5:18
13.	"Ghetto Religion" (Wyclef Jean featuring R. Kelly)	Nel Ust Wyclef Jean, Jerry "Wonda" Duplessis, Robert Kelly	previously unreleased	3:33
14.	"Honey Love" (radio edit) (R. Kelly and Public Announcement)	Robert Kelly	Born into the 90's	4:05
15.	"She's Got That Vibe" (single edit) (R. Kelly and Public Announcement)	Robert Kelly	Born into the 90's	3:22
16.	"The World's Greatest" (radio edit)	Robert Kelly	Ali: Original Soundtrack / Loveland (Bonus Disc)	3:57
17.	"I'm Your Angel" (single edit) (with Celine Dion)	Robert Kelly	These Are Special Times and R.	4:48
18.	"I Believe I Can Fly"	Robert Kelly	Space Jam: Music from and Inspired by the Motion Picture and R.	5:20
Total length:				73:32

== Charts ==
=== Weekly charts ===
Chart (2003)	Peak position
Australian Albums (ARIA)	33
Austrian Albums (Ö3 Austria)	62
Belgian Albums (Ultratop Flanders)	20
Belgian Albums (Ultratop Wallonia)	20
Dutch Albums (Album Top 100)	7
German Albums (Offizielle Top 100)	17
Irish Albums (IRMA)	35
Italian Albums (FIMI)	69
New Zealand Albums (RMNZ)	42
Scottish Albums (OCC)	13
Swedish Albums (Sverigetopplistan)	49
Swiss Albums (Schweizer Hitparade)	19
UK Albums (OCC)	4
US Billboard 200	4
US Top R&B/Hip-Hop Albums (Billboard)	2

=== Year-end charts ===
Chart (2003)	Position
Dutch Albums (Album Top 100)	94
UK Albums (OCC)	25
US Billboard 200	91
US Top R&B/Hip-Hop Albums (Billboard)	34
Worldwide Albums (IFPI)	45

Chart (2004)	Position
UK Albums (OCC)	97
US Billboard 200	138
US Top R&B/Hip-Hop Albums (Billboard)	32

== Certifications ==
Region	Certification	Certified units/sales
United Kingdom (BPI)	3× Platinum	900,000^{*}
United States (RIAA)	Platinum	1,000,000^{^}
United States (RIAA) DVD	Platinum	100,000^{^}
^{*} Sales figures based on certification alone.^{^} Shipments figures based on certification alone.
