= Snake (R. Kelly song) =

2003 single by R. Kelly

Single by R. Kelly featuring Big Tigger

from the album Chocolate Factory
- Released: April 28, 2003
- Genre: R&B
- Length: 4:51
- Label: Jive
- Songwriters: Robert Kelly; Darian Morgan
- Producer: R. Kelly

R. Kelly singles chronology
"Ignition (Remix)" (2002)	"Snake" (2003)	"Soldier's Heart" (2003)

"Snake" is a song by the American recording artist R. Kelly, featuring Big Tigger, from his fifth studio album, Chocolate Factory. The remix features Cam'ron. It was released on April 28, 2003, by Jive Records as the second single from the album. The R&B song with Latin music inspiration was written and produced by R. Kelly, and co-written by Darian Morgan, as a tribute to Stevie Wonder's musical experimentation. The song also inspired the dancehall reggae riddim called Baghdad.

"Snake" achieved moderate success, reaching number 16 on the US Billboard Hot 100. A special double-A-side edition with "Thoia Thoing" was also released. The maxi-single charted at number 10 in the Netherlands, number 30 in France, number sixteen in Australia and at number 18 in Switzerland. A remix with actor and musician Cam'ron was also released.

== Background and composition ==
"Snake"
A 22-second sample of the song's chorus, which features R. Kelly singing over a latin-inspired melody.

"Snake" was written and produced by R. Kelly, and co-written by Darian Morgan. It is an R&B song with Latin music inspiration, and elements of urban pop and new jack swing. "Snake" is four minutes and fifty-one seconds long. It is composed in the key of A♭ major and is set in time signature of common time with a tempo of 92 beats per minute. R. Kelly vocal range spans from C♯_{4} to F♯_{5}. Andrew McGregor of the BBC revealed that "Snake" was written in "tribute to Stevie [Wonder]'s musical experimentation". Robert Christgau describes the song as an "Orientalist sex fantasy".

== Promotion ==
R. Kelly and Big Tigger performed the song together during many live performances (including at Madison Square Garden in New York on the penultimate concert) during his 2003 tour and during the 2003 BET Awards. "Snake" received a special double A-side edition with "Thoia Thoing". The maxi-single charted at number 10 in the Netherlands, number 30 in France, number 16 in Australia and at number 18 in Switzerland. A remix with Cam'ron was also released.

=== Remix controversy ===
Cam'ron took R. Kelly to court in 2005 claiming that he did not receive proper credit for his work on a remix of the song. Cam'ron filed a federal lawsuit in New York. He had apparently written the introduction to the remix, as well as a part of the third verse but his songwriting contribution was not mentioned in the copyright when the song was included on The R. in R&B Collection, Vol. 1, a greatest-hits album.

== Music video ==
The music videos for both the original and the remix were directed by Little X.

== Track listing ==
- European CD single
1. "Snake" (Radio Edit) – 4:20
2. "Snake" (Remix Featuring Big Tigger and Cam'ron) – 4:40
3. "Dream Girl" – 3:57
4. "Snake" (Music Video) – 4:14
- 12-inch vinyl
1. "Snake" (Radio Edit) – 4:20
2. "Dream Girl" – 3:57
3. "Snake" (Remix Featuring Big Tigger and Cam'ron) – 4:40
- CD single
1. "Snake" (Radio Edit) – 4:20
2. "Snake" (Radio Edit Without Rap) – 3:34
3. "Snake" (Instrumental) – 4:52

== Personnel ==
Personnel are adapted from CD single liner notes.

- R. Kelly – vocals, audio mixing, production, songwriting
- Big Tigger – vocals
- Darian Morgan – songwriting
- Donnie Lyle – instruments
- Rodney East – instruments
- Abel Garibaldi – programming
- Andy Gallas – programming
- Ian Mereness – programming
- Jason Mlodzinski – programming
- Nathan Wheeler – programming
- Steve Bearsley – programming
- Larry Phillabaum – engineering
- Tim Roberts – engineering
- John Hanes – engineering
- Serban Ghenea – audio mixing
- Swizz Beatz – audio mixing

== Charts ==
=== Weekly charts ===
Weekly chart performance for "Snake"
Chart (2003)	Peak position
Scottish Singles Sales (Official Charts)	22
UK Singles (Official Charts)	10
UK Hip Hop/R&B (Official Charts)	4
US Billboard Hot 100	16
US Hot R&B/Hip-Hop Songs (Billboard)	9
US Rhythmic Airplay (Billboard)	10

=== Year-end charts ===
Year-end chart performance for "Snake"
Chart (2003)	Position
UK Urban (Music Week)	7
US Hot R&B/Hip-Hop Singles & Tracks (Billboard)	57
US Rhythmic Top 40 (Billboard)	61

== Release history ==
Release dates and formats for "Snake"
Region	Date	Format(s)	Label(s)	Ref.
United States	April 28, 2003	Urban radio	Jive	
United Kingdom	August 11, 2003	12-inch vinyl; CD; cassette	Jive	
