= Thoia Thoing =

2003 single by R. Kelly

Single by R. Kelly

from the album The R. in R&B Collection, Vol. 1
- Released: July 21, 2003
- Genre: Dancehall
- Length: 3:41
- Label: Jive; Tavdash
- Songwriter: Robert Kelly
- Producer: R. Kelly

R. Kelly singles chronology
| "Clubbin'" (2003) | "Thoia Thoing" (2003) | "Hotel" (2003) |

"Thoia Thoing" is a song by American singer R. Kelly. It was written and produced by Kelly for his first compilation album, The R. in R&B Collection, Vol. 1 (2003). The song was released as the album's lead single in July 2003 and peaked at number 13 on the US Billboard Hot 100. In the United Kingdom, the song was released on a double A-side with "Step in the Name of Love" and in selected territories with "Snake" (featuring Big Tigger), both lifted from his previous album, Chocolate Factory (2003).

== Music video ==
The music video for "Thoia Thoing" was directed by Little X, who directed most of R. Kelly's videos at that time. R. Kelly's wife at that time, Andrea Kelly was the choreographer and main background dancer in the video.

== Remixes ==
The official remix features Birdman and Busta Rhymes, and appears on the bonus CD of the DVD album The R. in R&B Video Collection. The remix can also be found on the 2003 mixtape The Diplomats 5 featuring Cam'ron.

== Track listing ==
All tracks written by R. Kelly; "Snake" co-written by Darian Morgan.

German CD single
| No. | Title | Producer(s) | Length |
|---|---|---|---|
| 1. | "Thoia Thoing" (album version) | R. Kelly | 3:43 |
| 2. | "Snake" (featuring Big Tigger) | R. Kelly | 4:51 |

UK CD single
| No. | Title | Producer(s) | Length |
|---|---|---|---|
| 1. | "Step in the Name of Love" (Remix) (radio edit) | R. Kelly | 4:55 |
| 2. | "Thoia Thoing" (album version) | R. Kelly | 3:40 |
| 3. | "Thoia Thoing" (R. Kelly, Silk & The People's Choice remix) | R. Kelly; Steve "Silk" Hurley^{[a]} | 3:51 |
| 4. | "Step in the Name of Love" (remix video) | | 5:31 |

Notes

- ^{^[a]} denotes additional remix producer(s)

== Charts ==
=== Weekly charts ===
Weekly chart performance for "Thoia Thoing"
| Chart (2003) | Peak position |
|---|---|
| Australia (ARIA) | 16 |
| Belgium (Ultratop 50 Flanders) | 14 |
| Belgium (Ultratop 50 Wallonia) | 22 |
| France (SNEP) | 30 |
| Germany (GfK) | 23 |
| Netherlands (Dutch Top 40) | 13 |
| Netherlands (Single Top 100) | 10 |
| Scotland Singles (Official Charts) with "Step in the Name of Love" | 34 |
| Sweden (Sverigetopplistan) | 55 |
| Switzerland (Schweizer Hitparade) | 18 |
| UK Singles (Official Charts) with "Step in the Name of Love" | 14 |
| UK Hip Hop/R&B (Official Charts) | 30 |
| UK Hip Hop/R&B (Official Charts) with "Step in the Name of Love" | 6 |
| US Billboard Hot 100 | 13 |
| US Dance Singles Sales (Billboard) Silk's House remix | 5 |
| US Dance/Mix Show Airplay (Billboard) | 23 |
| US Hot R&B/Hip-Hop Songs (Billboard) | 6 |
| US Rhythmic Airplay (Billboard) | 16 |

=== Year-end charts ===
Year-end chart performance for "Thoia Thoing"
| Chart (2003) | Position |
|---|---|
| Belgium (Ultratop 50 Flanders) | 93 |
| US Billboard Hot 100 | 61 |
| US Hot R&B/Hip-Hop Singles & Tracks (Billboard) | 29 |
| US Rhythmic Top 40 (Billboard) | 64 |

== Release history ==
Release dates and formats for "Thoia Thoing"
| Region | Date | Format(s) | Label(s) | Ref. |
|---|---|---|---|---|
| United States | July 21, 2003 | Rhythmic contemporary; urban contemporary radio | Jive; Tavdash | |
| United States | August 18, 2003 | Contemporary hit radio | Jive; Tavdash | |
| Australia | October 13, 2003 | CD | Jive; Tavdash; BMG Australia | |
| United Kingdom | November 3, 2003 | 12-inch vinyl; CD; cassette | Jive; Tavdash | |
