= Happy People (R. Kelly song) =

2004 single by R. Kelly

Single by R. Kelly

from the album Happy People/U Saved Me
- Released: March 22, 2004
- Length: 7:49
- Label: Jive
- Songwriter: Robert Kelly
- Producer: R. Kelly

R. Kelly singles chronology
| "Gangsta Girl" (2003) | "Happy People" (2004) | "So Sexy" (2004) |

"Happy People" is a song by American R&B recording artist R. Kelly. Like Kelly's previous single, "Step in the Name of Love", the song is about the stepping dance. It was released on March 22, 2004, as the lead single from his second double album, Happy People/U Saved Me (2004). The song went to number 19 on the US Billboard Hot 100 and number seven on the Billboard Hot R&B/Hip-Hop Singles & Tracks chart. In some territories, it was released as a double A-side with "U Saved Me"; this issue peaked at number six in the United Kingdom.

== Music video ==
The music video is directed by Little X.

== Charts ==
All entries charted with "U Saved Me" except where noted.

=== Weekly charts ===
| Chart (2004) | Peak position |
|---|---|
| Belgium (Ultratip Bubbling Under Flanders) | 2 |
| Belgium (Ultratip Bubbling Under Wallonia) | 2 |
| Europe (Eurochart Hot 100) | 17 |
| Germany (GfK) "Happy People" only | 49 |
| Ireland (IRMA) "Happy People" only | 13 |
| Italy (FIMI) | 36 |
| Netherlands (Dutch Top 40 Tipparade) | 4 |
| Netherlands (Single Top 100) | 40 |
| Scotland Singles (OCC) | 15 |
| Switzerland (Schweizer Hitparade) | 49 |
| UK Singles (OCC) | 6 |
| UK Hip Hop/R&B (OCC) | 2 |
| US Billboard Hot 100 "Happy People" only | 19 |
| US Hot R&B/Hip-Hop Songs (Billboard) "Happy People" only | 7 |

=== Year-end charts ===
| Chart (2004) | Position |
|---|---|
| UK Singles (OCC) | 131 |
| US Billboard Hot 100 | 94 |
| US Hot R&B/Hip-Hop Singles & Tracks (Billboard) | 33 |

== Release history ==
| Region | Date | Format(s) | Label(s) | Ref. |
|---|---|---|---|---|
| United States | March 22, 2004 | Urban radio | Jive | |
| United Kingdom | October 18, 2004 | CD | Jive | |

== "Christmas, I'll Be Steppin" ==
"Christmas, I'll Be Steppin'"

Song by R. Kelly
- Released: November 15, 2013
- Length: 5:26
- Label: RCA
- Songwriter: Robert Kelly
- Producer: R. Kelly

R. Kelly chronology
| My Story (2013) | Christmas, I'll Be Steppin' (2013) | Do What U Want (2013) |

"Christmas, I'll Be Steppin'" was recorded by Kelly for the soundtrack of the movie The Best Man Holiday, and plays during the end credits. The song resembles "Happy People", but with different lyrics and a more Christmas feel to it. "Christmas, I'll Be Steppin'" is the fifth song on the official soundtrack to The Best Man Holiday and is one of the few songs that is not a cover version of another song.

=== Charts ===
| Chart (2013) | Peak position |
|---|---|
| US Adult R&B Songs (Billboard) | 26 |
