= Feelin' Single =

Single by R. Kelly

from the album Write Me Back
- Released: May 29, 2012 (digital)
- Recorded: 2012
- Genre: R&B; soul
- Length: 3:29 (album version)
- Label: RCA
- Songwriters: Robert Kelly; Dornell Mays
- Producers: R. Kelly; Bigg Makk (co.)

R. Kelly singles chronology
"Share My Love" (2012)	"Feelin' Single" (2012)	"I Look to You" (2012)

"Feelin' Single" is the second single by American R&B/soul singer-songwriter-producer R. Kelly from his eleventh studio album Write Me Back. The song peaked at number one on the Billboard Adult R&B Songs chart, number 13 on the Bubbling Under Hot 100 Singles chart, and number 15 on the Billboard Hot R&B/Hip-Hop Songs chart. The song was written and produced by Kelly himself and Bigg Makk.

== Charts ==
=== Weekly charts ===
Chart (2012)	Peak position
US Bubbling Under Hot 100 (Billboard)	13
US Hot R&B/Hip-Hop Songs (Billboard)	15

=== Year-end charts ===
Chart (2012)	Position
US Hot R&B/Hip-Hop Songs (Billboard)	66
