= Happy People/U Saved Me =

Studio album by R. Kelly
- Released: August 24, 2004
- Recorded: January–May 2004
- Studio: The Chocolate Factory, Chicago, Illinois
- Length: 100:12
- Label: Jive
- Producer: R. Kelly

R. Kelly chronology
The R. in R&B Collection, Vol. 1 (2003)	Happy People/U Saved Me (2004)	Unfinished Business (2004)

Singles from Happy People/U Saved Me
- 1. "Happy People" Released: March 22, 2004; 2. "U Saved Me" Released: October 19, 2004

Happy People/U Saved Me is the sixth studio album and the second and final double album by American R&B singer R. Kelly, where he mixed feel-good danceable soul records (Happy People) with gospel anthems (U Saved Me). Released in 2004, it peaked at No. 2 on the pop albums chart and went on to be certified three times Platinum. The album contained the hit single "Happy People" (US No. 19, UK No. 6), and the minor hit "U Saved Me" (US No. 52, UK No. 6). On "Red Carpet (Pause, Flash)", Kelly interpolated the song "Step in the Name of Love" on his previous album, which was released a year earlier.

== Critical reception ==
Professional ratings
Aggregate scores
Source	Rating
Metacritic	66/100
Review scores
Source	Rating
AllMusic	4/5 stars
Blender	3/5 stars
Entertainment Weekly	B+/B-
Los Angeles Times	3/5 stars
Rolling Stone	3/5 stars
Stylus Magazine	B−
Uncut	4/5 stars
The Village Voice	D+

Happy People/U Saved Me received generally positive reviews from critics. At Metacritic, which assigns a normalized rating out of 100 to reviews from mainstream critics, the album has an average score of 66 based on 16 reviews. Richard Cromelin from Los Angeles Times found that "the album’s sonic signature is a celebrative clap" and further remarked: "Charming, unpretentious and effortless, the singer presides over a party whose pace never flags and whose soul is fun-loving and wholesome." AllMusic editor Stephen Thomas Erlewine felt that "since Happy People/U Saved Me delivers two distinct and cohesive albums, it could conceivably offer further ammunition for those defenders of Kelly who claim that he's made the best music of his career when under fire. There's some validity to that argument." He called the album a "definitive work of sorts since he's at the top of his game as both a craftsman and conman." Uncut described the album as "a cunning, crackling, can't-keep-still classic."

Gail Mitchell from Billboard found that "Kelly's winning musical streak" was continuing with Happy People/U Saved Me and noted that he had "an uncanny ability to mix retro sounds with tasty dollops of contemporary seasoning." PopMatters remarked that while Happy People "finds Kelly honing his already well developed skills at creating effortless dance hooks, the second disc Kelly seems to be trapped in staid evangelical idioms and drowning in itchy church choir robes." Similarly, Entertainment Weekly's David Browne noted the "problem separating sinner and salvation seeker into two albums becomes apparent as U Saved Me gets bogged down in one indistinct, syrup-doused ballad after another." On the contrary, Dan Leroy from Launch.com found that "the sacred material on U Saved Me, by contrast, is more exciting – and troubling." In his review for The Village Voice, Robert Christgau remarked that Kelly's "productivity isn't exuberance, it's greed; his PG rating isn't scruples, it's cowardice." Kefelah Sanneh, writing for The New York Times, felt that there was "something rather unambitious about this set."

== Commercial performance ==
In his home country of the United States, Happy People/U Saved Me debuted at number two on the Billboard 200, selling 403,000 copies in its first week, behind Tim McGraw's Live Like You Were Dying. The album was the sixth consecutive Kelly solo album (seventh overall) to debut at number one on the Billboard Top R&B/Hip-Hop Albums. In its second week, the album remained in the top ten at Billboard 200, falling to number six, selling 127,000 copies. On September 24, 2004, the double album has been certified 3× platinum by the Recording Industry Association of America (RIAA), for shipping more than 3 million units (in this case, 1.5 million double album sets, which are double-counted by the RIAA). As of December 6, 2011, Happy People/U Saved Me has sold 5.2 million copies worldwide.

== Track listing ==
- All songs written, produced and arranged by R. Kelly.

Happy People — Disc one
No.	Title	Length
1.	"Weatherman"	2:41
2.	"Red Carpet (Pause, Flash)"	3:37
3.	"Love Signals"	5:28
4.	"Love Street"	4:37
5.	"Ladies' Night (Treat Her Like Heaven)"	3:45
6.	"If"	4:49
7.	"The Greatest Show On Earth"	4:48
8.	"It's Your Birthday"	2:44
9.	"Steppin' Into Heaven"	3:54
10.	"If I Could Make the World Dance"	5:28
11.	"Happy People"	7:49

U Saved Me — Disc two
No.	Title	Length
1.	"3-Way Phone Call" (featuring Kelly Price, Kim Burrell & Maurice Mahon)	7:03
2.	"U Saved Me"	6:13
3.	"Prayer Changes"	6:24
4.	"How Did You Manage"	3:45
5.	"I Surrender"	4:45
6.	"When I Think About You"	4:06
7.	"Diary of Me"	4:19
8.	"Spirit"	3:57
9.	"Leap of Faith"	4:51
10.	"Peace"	5:09

== Credits and personnel ==
Credits adapted from AllMusic.

- Delatrice Alexander – choir, chorus
- Michael Avery – choir, chorus
- Steve Bearsley – assistant, engineer, main personnel, programming
- George I. III Broughton – choir, chorus
- Kim Burrell – featured artist, primary artist
- Jeff Chestek – string engineer
- Joan Collaso – choir, chorus
- Dee Dee – illustrations
- Rodney East – keyboards, main personnel
- Felicia Coleman Evans – choir, chorus
- Sonya Frank – choir, chorus
- Kimberly Ann Franklin – choir, chorus
- Yvonne Gage – choir, chorus
- Andy Gallas – assistant, audio engineer, engineer, main personnel, programming
- Abel Garibaldi – audio engineer, engineer, main personnel, mixing, programming, vocals, background vocals
- Omar Gilbert – unknown contributor role
- Senabelle Gill – choir, chorus
- Larry Gold – conductor, string arrangements
- Dejah Gomez – choir, chorus
- Pastor Chris Sr. Harris – choir, chorus
- Brandon Hull – assistant
- Earickia L. Isom – hair stylist
- R. Kelly – arranger, audio production, composer, main personnel, mixing, primary artist, producer, string arrangements, vocals
- Gregg Landfair – guitar
- Donnie Lyle – bass, bass instrument, guitar, main personnel, vocals, background vocals
- Paul Mabin – choir, chorus
- Maurice Mahon – featured artist, primary artist
- John McGlinchey – assistant
- Ian Mereness – engineer, main personnel, mixing, programming
- Jason Mlodzinski – assistant, engineer, main personnel, programming
- Peter Mokran – audio engineer, engineer
- Jeffrey Morrow – choir, chorus
- Jackie Murphy – art direction, design
- Lori Holton Nash – choir, chorus
- Kendall D. Nesbitt – keyboards, main personnel, vocals
- Armirris Palmore – choir, chorus
- Lauren Pilot – choir, chorus
- Herb Powers – mastering
- Kelly Price – featured artist, guest artist, main personnel, primary artist, vocals
- Riesig & Taylor – photography
- Montez Roberts – assistant
- Stevie Robinson – choir, chorus
- David Ross – set design
- Johnny Rutledge – choir, chorus
- Cristino Sanchez – choir, chorus
- Roberta Thomas – choir, chorus
- Devin B. Thompson – choir, chorus
- Uncle Life – main personnel, vocals, background vocals
- Seth Waldman – assistant
- Pamela Watson – stylist
- Nathan Wheeler – assistant, engineer, main personnel, programming, vocals, background vocals

== Charts ==
=== Weekly charts ===
Weekly chart performance for Happy People/U Saved Me
Chart (2004)	Peak position
Australian Albums (ARIA)	62
Austrian Albums (Ö3 Austria)	60
Belgian Albums (Ultratop Flanders)	42
Belgian Albums (Ultratop Wallonia)	20
Canadian Albums (Nielsen SoundScan)	16
Canadian R&B Albums (Nielsen SoundScan)	20
Dutch Albums (Album Top 100)	10
French Albums (SNEP)	19
German Albums (Offizielle Top 100)	10
Italian Albums (FIMI)	28
Norwegian Albums (VG-lista)	39
Scottish Albums (OCC)	35
South African Albums (RISA)	1
Swiss Albums (Schweizer Hitparade)	21
Swedish Albums (Sverigetopplistan)	26
UK Albums (OCC)	11
UK R&B Albums (OCC)	2
US Billboard 200	2
US Top R&B/Hip-Hop Albums (Billboard)	1

=== Year-end charts ===
Year-end chart performance for Happy People/U Saved Me
Chart (2004)	Peak position
US Billboard 200	75
US Top R&B/Hip-Hop Albums (Billboard)	16
Worldwide Albums (IFPI)	48

== Certifications ==
Sales and certifications for Happy People/U Saved Me
Region	Certification	Certified units/sales
South Africa (RISA)	Platinum	50,000^{*}
United Kingdom (BPI)	Gold	100,000^{^}
United States (RIAA)	3× Platinum	1,500,000^{^}
Summaries
Worldwide	—	5,200,000
^{*} Sales figures based on certification alone.^{^} Shipments figures based on certification alone.

== See also ==
- List of number-one R&B albums of 2004 (U.S.)
