= U Saved Me =

Single by R. Kelly

from the album Happy People/U Saved Me and Epic
- Released: October 19, 2004
- Recorded: 2003
- Genre: Gospel
- Length: 6:12 (album version); 5:20 (radio edit)
- Label: Jive
- Songwriter: Robert Kelly
- Producer: R. Kelly

R. Kelly singles chronology
"Wonderful" (2004)	"U Saved Me" (2004)	"Big Chips" (2004)

"U Saved Me" is a gospel song by R. Kelly. Taken as the title track single from U Saved Me (a part of the Happy People/U Saved Me double disc album), it reached number 52 on the Billboard Hot 100 and number 14 on the Hot R&B and Hip-Hop Songs charts. The song later appeared on Kelly's 2010 album, Epic.

== Music video ==
The music video was directed by Little X under his real name, Julien Christian Lutz.

== Live performance ==
Kelly sang this song live for the first time at the 2005 Soul Train Awards Show.

== Song content ==
Kelly narrates four real-life stories based on trials and tribulations of individuals and how they turned it over to God so that He can save them. The first verse describes a drunk driver who nearly lost his life in a car accident, the second verse describes a person on unemployment and has trouble looking for work, the third verse describes an 18-year-old drug dealer who was involved in a shootout when a drug deal went bad, and the fourth verse describes a person diagnosed with cancer who reached out to his mother to pray for him. In each situation, they were thankful to be given a second chance at life.

== Charts ==
=== Weekly charts ===
All entries charted with "Happy People" except where noted.

Chart performance for "U Saved Me"
Chart (2004)	Peak position
Belgium (Ultratip Bubbling Under Flanders)	2
Belgium (Ultratip Bubbling Under Wallonia)	2
Netherlands (Single Top 100)	40
Scotland Singles (OCC)	15
Switzerland (Schweizer Hitparade)	49
UK Singles (OCC)	6
UK Hip Hop/R&B (OCC)	2
US Billboard Hot 100 "U Saved Me" only	52
US Hot R&B/Hip-Hop Songs (Billboard) "U Saved Me" only	14

=== Year-end charts ===
Year-end chart performance for "U Saved Me"
Chart (2004)	Position
US Hot R&B/Hip-Hop Singles & Tracks (Billboard)	61

== Release history ==
Release history and formats for "U Saved Me"
Region	Date	Format(s)	Label(s)	Ref.
United States	July 6, 2004	Rhythmic contemporary; urban contemporary radio	Jive; Zomba	
