= Director X =

Canadian music video director and producer

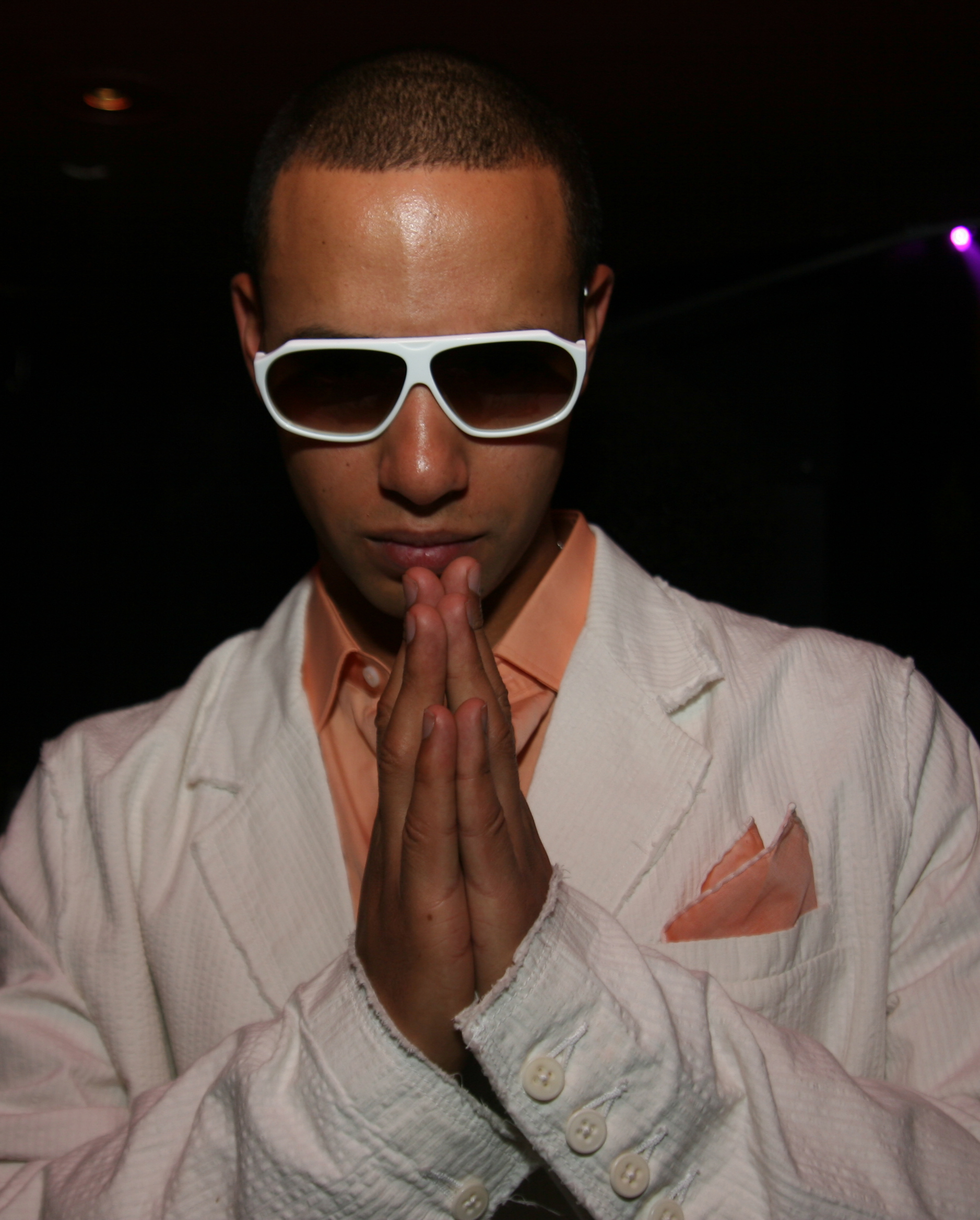
- Director X in October 2005
- Born: Julien Christian Lutz; October 31, 1975 (age 51); Toronto, Ontario, Canada
- Other names: X; Little X; Mr. X
- Occupations: Music video director; film director; producer
- Years active: 1998–present
- Website: directorxfilms.com

Julien Christian Lutz (born October 31, 1975), known professionally as Director X, is a Canadian music video director. Having trained under Hype Williams, Lutz has been credited for directing over a hundred music videos spanning various genres since 1998, including Jay-Z, Drake, Future, John Mayer, Kanye West, DJ Khaled, Usher, Ice Cube, Little Mix, Fabolous, Fifth Harmony, Mystikal and Akon. In film, he directed the crime thriller Superfly in 2018, which saw mixed reception. In television, he created the short-lived action drama Robyn Hood in 2023.

== Early life ==
Lutz was born and raised in the Greater Toronto Area, mostly in and around Brampton, and is of mixed Afro-Trinidadian and Swiss descent.

== Career ==
=== Early work ===
Lutz began his career working on several productions; he was a visual consultant on Hype Williams' 1998 film Belly. Lutz was slated to direct Disney's horror feature Razorwire, though the film never moved into production.

=== Music videos ===
Lutz worked on several projects and trained under Hype Williams. Since the late 1990s, Lutz has directed dozens of music videos and been noted for his high-budget, visually distinctive music videos, including for The Wanted, R. Kelly, Aaliyah, DMX, Mystikal, Usher, Kanye West, Jay-Z, Korn, David Guetta, Nelly Furtado, Sean Paul, Justin Bieber, Drake, Nicki Minaj, T.I., Little Mix, Rihanna, Union J, Fifth Harmony, Miguel, One Direction, Zayn Malik and Iggy Azalea. In 2004, Lutz appeared in Mya Baker's documentary film Silence: In Search of Black Female Sexuality in America.

In 2015, Lutz founded his own production company, Popp Rok, in Toronto. In 2017, he appeared on episode 7 of Cycle 23 of America's Next Top Model ("X Marks The Spot") as the director for a Gypsy Sports-themed music video.

=== Films ===
In addition to music video directing, Lutz has directed two feature films and one television film; he made his feature directorial debut in 2015 with Across the Line. The film starred Stephan James and the storyline was inspired by the 1989 Cole Harbour District High School race riots. Across the Line was set and shot in Nova Scotia. The first screening of Across the Line was 19 September 2015 at the Atlantic Film Festival where it won the award for "Best Atlantic Feature".

In 2016, he directed the teen drama television film Center Stage: On Pointe. The film stars Nicole Muñoz, Barton Cowperthwaite, Maude Green, Chloe Lukasiak, Kenny Wormald and Peter Gallagher. It premiered on Lifetime on June 25, 2016. The official DVD was released on September 6, 2016. Variety critic Sonia Saraiya noted of Lutz's direction, "...though it is frustrating that the film feels like 15-odd low-budget music videos strung together, the dance in those segments, and the way it's filmed, are some of the best parts of the movie."

In 2018, Lutz directed Superfly, a remake of the 1972 blaxploitation film of the same name. Superfly was released in the United States on June 13, 2018, and received mixed reviews from critics. Variety's Owen Gleiberman wrote: "Shot in a functional, slammed-together manner that's less sensually stylish than you'd expect from a music-video auteur, the film is a competent yet glossy and hermetic street-hustle drug thriller, less a new urban myth than a lavishly concocted episode. It holds your attention yet leaves you with nothing."

== Filmography ==
=== Television series ===
- 2020: October Faction
- 2022: The Imperfects
- 2023: Robyn Hood
- 2024: Cross

=== Feature films ===
- 2015: Across the Line
- 2016: Center Stage: On Pointe
- 2018: Superfly

=== Music videos ===
2026

- Yeat featuring EsDeeKid - "Made It On Our Own"

2024

- Soprano - "Facile à Danser"

2022

- Future featuring Drake and Tems - "Wait for U"
- Black Eyed Peas, Shakira and David Guetta - "Don't You Worry"
- Drake - "Falling Back"

2021

- Rosalía featuring The Weeknd - "La Fama"

2020

- Ariana Grande - "34+35"
- Demi Lovato - "Commander in Chief"
- Future featuring Drake - "Life Is Good"
- Lil Yachty and DaBaby featuring Drake - "Oprah's Bank Account"
- DJ Khaled featuring Drake - "Popstar"
- Black Eyed Peas, Ozuna and J. Rey Soul - "Mamacita"

2019

- Khalid - "Right Back"
- Rosalía and J Balvin featuring El Guincho - "Con Altura"

2018

- French Montana - "Famous"

2017

- Miguel featuring Travis Scott - "Sky Walker"
- Bebe Rexha featuring Lil Wayne - "The Way I Are (Dance with Somebody)"
- Little Mix - "Touch"
- DJ Snake featuring Jeremih, Young Thug and Swizz Beatz - "The Half"

2016

- Zayn - "Like I Would"
- Rihanna featuring Drake - "Work"
- Fifth Harmony featuring Ty Dolla Sign - "Work from Home"
- Little Mix featuring Sean Paul - "Hair"
- Fifth Harmony featuring Fetty Wap - "All in My Head (Flex)"

2015

- Drake - "Hotline Bling"
- Iggy Azalea featuring Jennifer Hudson - "Trouble"
- Flo Rida featuring Robin Thicke and Verdine White - "I Don't Like It, I Love It"
- Jamie Foxx featuring Chris Brown - "You Changed Me"
- Kendrick Lamar - "King Kunta"
- Little Mix - "Black Magic"

2014

- Union J - "Tonight (We Live Forever)"
- DJ Cassidy featuring R. Kelly - "Make the World Go Round"
- Jennifer Hudson featuring Timbaland - "Walk It Out"
- DJ Cassidy featuring Robin Thicke and Jessie J - "Calling All Hearts"
- Iggy Azalea featuring Charli XCX - "Fancy"
- T.I. featuring Iggy Azalea - "No Mediocre"
- Iggy Azalea featuring Rita Ora - "Black Widow"
- Wiz Khalifa - "Stayin Out All Night"

2013

- Drake - "Worst Behavior"
- Busta Rhymes - "Twerk It"
- The-Dream - "IV Play"
- Ciara - "Body Party"
- Angel - "The World"
- Drake - "Started from the Bottom"
- Little Mix - "Little Me"

2012

- R. Kelly - "Share My Love"
- Drake - "HYFR"
- Shanell featuring Lil Wayne and Drake - "So Good/6 AM"
- Nelly Furtado - "Big Hoops (Bigger the Better)"
- The Wanted - "Chasing The Sun"
- Justin Bieber - "Boyfriend"
- 2 Chainz featuring Drake - "No Lie"
- Rick Ross featuring Wale and Drake - "Diced Pineapples"
- Manika - "Good Girls"

2011

- Karl Wolf featuring Kardinal Offishall - "Ghetto Love"
- Mohombi featuring Nicole Scherzinger - "Coconut Tree"
- The Wanted - "Glad You Came"
- The Wanted - "Warzone"

2010

- Street Pharmacy - "Stone Bricks And Mortar"
- Sean Kingston - "Letting Go (Dutty Love)"
- Nicki Minaj - "Your Love"
- The-Dream - "Love King"

2009

- Birdman featuring Lil Wayne, Rick Ross and Young Jeezy - "Always Strapped"
- K-os featuring Saukrates and Nelly Furtado - "I Wish I Knew Natalie Portman"
- K-os - "Robot Kid"
- Sean Paul - "Now That I've Got Your Love"
- Nelly Furtado - "Más"
- Sean Paul - "Hold My Hand"
- David Guetta featuring Estelle - "One Love"
- Nelly Furtado - "Manos al Aire"
- Estelle featuring Sean Paul - "Come Over"

2008

- Brandy - "Right Here (Departed)"
- Common - "Universal Mind Control" (Original Version)
- Deborah Cox - "Beautiful U R"

2007

- R. Kelly featuring Usher - "Same Girl"
- Chrisette Michele - "Be OK"
- Trey Songz - "Wonder Woman"
- Baby Bash featuring Sean Kingston - "What Is It"

2006

- Ne-Yo - "When You're Mad"
- Sean Paul featuring Keyshia Cole - "(When You Gonna) Give It Up to Me"
- Korn - "Coming Undone"
- Keshia Chanté - "Been Gone"
- Nelly Furtado featuring Timbaland - "Promiscuous"
- The Game - "Let's Ride"
- Xzibit - "Concentrate"
- Cassie - "Me & U" (original version)

2005

- Usher - Rhythm City Volume One: Caught Up (20-minute short film)
- Sean Paul - "Temperature"
- Ludacris - "Pimpin' All Over the World"
- David Banner - "Play"
- Rico Love - "Settle Down"
- Rihanna - "Pon de Replay"
- Ray J - "One Wish"
- R. Kelly - "Happy People"
- R. Kelly - "U Saved Me" (directed under his real name Julien Christian Lutz)
- Ying Yang Twins - "Wait (The Whisper Song)"
- Usher - "Caught Up"

2004

- Lloyd Banks featuring Avant - "Karma"
- Mario - "Let Me Love You"
- Kanye West - "The New Workout Plan"
- JDiggz - "Puush It Up"
- Keshia Chanté - "Does He Love Me?"
- Nelly featuring Christina Aguilera - "Tilt Ya Head Back"
- Akon - "Ghetto"
- Usher featuring Ludacris and Lil Jon - "Yeah"
- Method Man featuring Busta Rhymes- “What's Happenin”

2003

- Clipse featuring Faith Evans - "Ma, I Don't Love Her"
- G-Unit - "Poppin' Them Thangs"
- Ginuwine - "There It Is"
- Keshia Chanté - "Bad Boy"
- Sean Paul featuring Sasha - "I'm Still In Love With You"
- Timbaland featuring Missy Elliott and Magoo - "Cop That Disk"
- Loon - "How You Want That"
- John Mayer - "Clarity"
- Sean Paul - "Get Busy"
- Wayne Wonder - "No Letting Go"
- Kelis - "Trick Me"
- Jay-Z featuring Pharrell Williams - "Excuse Me Miss"
- Melanie Durrant featuring Common - "Where I'm Goin'"
- Daniel Bedingfield - "Gotta Get Thru This"

2002

- Aaliyah - "I Care 4 U"
- Craig David - "What's Your Flava?"
- Sean Paul - "Gimme the Light"
- Benzino - "Rock The Party"
- Tweet - "Boogie / Smoking Cigarettes (unreleased)"
- Nelly - "Hot in Herre"
- Eve featuring Alicia Keys - "Gangsta Lovin'"
- Alicia Keys - "How Come U Don't Call Me Anymore?"
- Donell Jones featuring Styles P - "Put Me Down"
- Usher - "U Don't Have to Call"

2001

- Destiny's Child featuring Missy Elliott - "Bootylicious" (Rockwilder Remix)
- 112 - "Peaches and Cream"
- Fabolous featuring Nate Dogg - "Can't Deny It"
- Foxy Brown - “BK Anthem”
- Foxy Brown featuring Spragga Benz - “Oh Yeah”
- Jadakiss - "Knock Yourself Out"
- Usher - "U Got It Bad"
- R. Kelly featuring Jay Z - "Fiesta" (Remix)
- Kardinal Offishall - "Ol' Time Killin'"

2000

- M.O.P. - Ante Up (Robbin-Hoodz Theory)
- Reflection Eternal featuring Vinia Mojica - "The Blast"
- Mystikal featuring Pharrell - "Shake Ya Ass"
- Mystikal featuring Nivea - "Danger (Been So Long)"
- Ice Cube featuring Krayzie Bone - "Until We Rich" (co-directed with Cameron Casey)
- Ghostface Killah featuring Madam Majestic and U-God - "Cherchez La Ghost"
- Donell Jones - "Where I Wanna Be"
- Beanie Sigel featuring Eve - "Remember Them Days"
- Sisqó featuring Foxy Brown - "Thong Song" (Remix)
- Aaliyah featuring DMX - "Come Back in One Piece"

1999

- Case - "Happily Ever After"
- Choclair - "Let's Ride"
- Chris Rock - "No Sex (In the Champagne Room)"
- Terry Dexter – "Better Than Me"
- DMX - "What's My Name?"
- Eric Benét featuring Faith Evans - "Georgy Porgy"
- Marvelous 3 - "Freak of the Week"
- Mystikal featuring Outkast - "Neck Uv Da Woods"
- Ice Cube featuring Mack 10 and Ms. Toi - "You Can Do It" (co-directed with Cameron Casey)

1998

- N.O.R.E. featuring Big Pun, Nature, Cam'ron, Jadakiss and Styles P - "Banned from T.V."
- Made Men featuring The L.O.X. - "Tommy's Theme"
- Onyx featuring 50 Cent, Bonifucco, Still Livin' and X1 - "React"
- Onyx - "Broke Willies"
- Rascalz - "Northern Touch"
- Redman - "I'll Bee Dat!"
- Maestro - "Stick to Your Vision"
- Ghetto Concept - "Crazy World"
- Glenn Lewis - "Bout Your Love"
- Total - "Sittin' Home"
- EPMD - "Richter Scale"

=== Commercials ===
- 2008 - McCafe "Kiss" Spot - McDonald's
- 2010 - Yeo Boyz - Yeo Valley Organic
- 2018 - Gap - (fashion)

== Bibliography ==
- Henry Keazor, Thorsten Wübbena: Video Thrills The Radio Star. Musikvideos: Geschichte, Themen, Analysen. Bielefeld 2005, p. 111ss.
