= Big Tigger =

American media personality and rapper (born 1972)

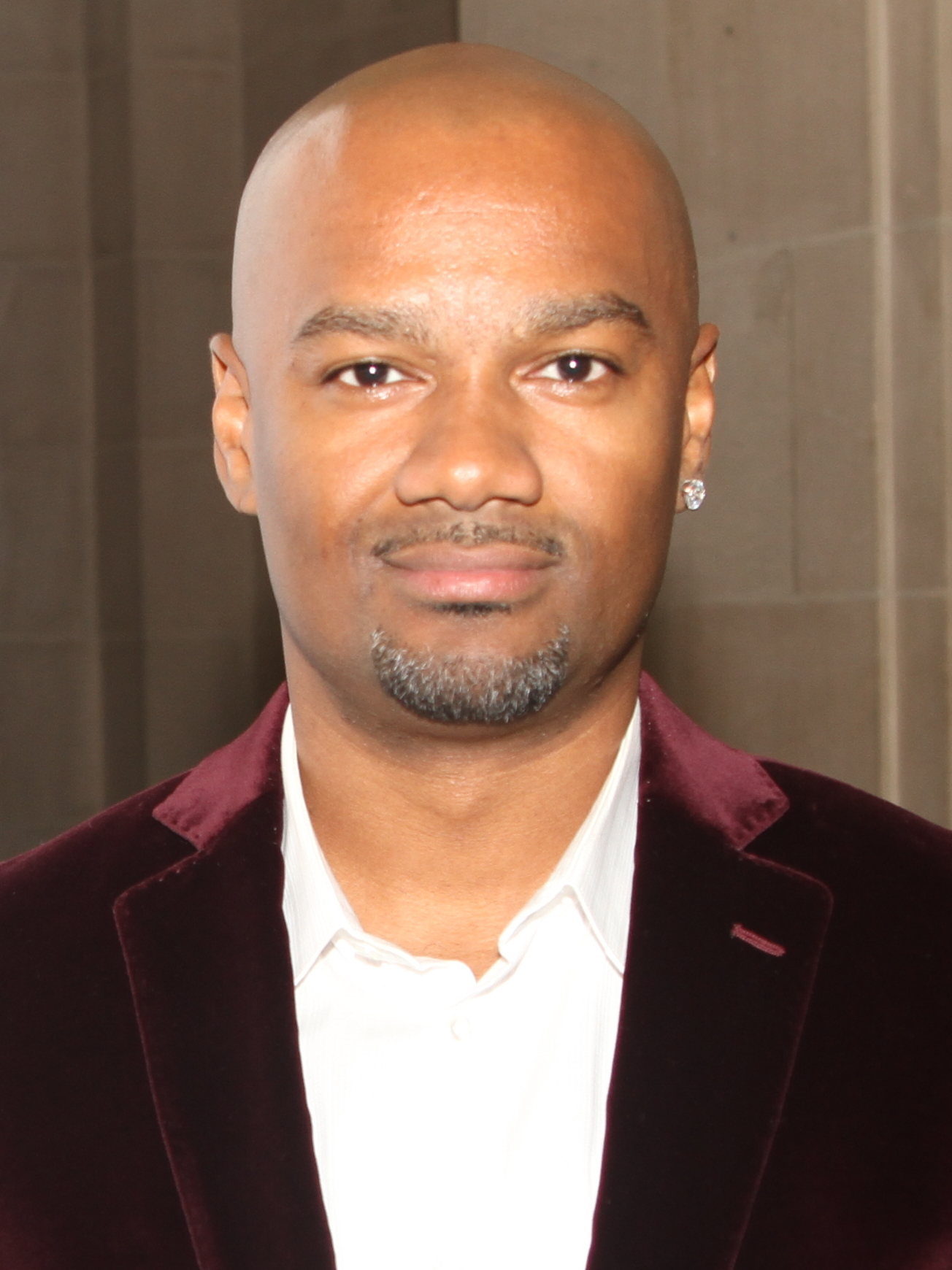
- Big Tigger in 2011
- Born: Darian Morgan; December 22, 1972 (age 53); The Bronx, New York, U.S.
- Presenting career
- Show: The Big Tigger Morning Show with Jazzy McBee; Rap City
- Station: WVEE
- Time slot: 6:00 am – 10:00 am
- Style: Television personality Radio personality Disc jockey Rapper
- Country: United States
- Previous show: The Big Tigger Morning Show
- Website: www.bigtigger.com/

Darian "Big Tigger" Morgan (born December 22, 1972), also known as Big Tigg, is an American television and radio personality, DJ and rapper best known as the host of BET's Rap City and 106 & Park.

== Biography ==
Morgan was born to a Jamaican immigrant mother and an African-American father. He grew up in Co-op City and played basketball at the Wheaton high school l courts in section 4. While growing up in Co-Op city he began to rap and scratch under a local DJ Rob Lasky; aka DJ All Might Scratch. Later, he started out working as a DJ at the radio station WERQ, 92Q in Baltimore, Maryland, but his road to success began a few years earlier. While attending the University of Maryland, College Park, he interned at Washington, D.C. radio station WPGC 95.5 FM. At WPGC, Morgan worked alongside popular host Albie Dee and was promptly recognized for his ambition and charisma. His college internship evolved into a flourishing career. Soon Morgan, with his innovative freestyles, gained popularity on night radio. When the Bronx native returned to New York City in 2001, he departed D.C. as the highest rated, six-year undefeated nighttime radio champion.

== BET career ==
=== Rise to fame ===
He entered the television scene on voiceovers for Black Entertainment Television in 1996, while still working the radio circuit. Within a year, fans were watching him on-camera, in Rap City's "Hip Hop News," and he advanced to become the co-host of Rap City in its tenth season, alongside Big Lez and Joe Clair. BET then changed the show's format, and Morgan became the lone video jockey. He hosted the show from 1998 to 2005, before being replaced by Mad Linx.

==== Latter end ====
Big Tigger hosted BET's top rated show Rap City: Tha Basement until 2005 (replaced by Mad Linx, and another show BET Style until its final episode on July 6, 2006. He also hosted numerous episodes of BET: Uncut.

== Radio ==
Until April 2013, Morgan hosted Live In Tha Den with Big Tigger, a syndicated radio show on weekends that aired on various Urban and Rhythmic formatted Hip-Hop/R&B stations across the country. On his show Live In the Den, hip hop stars such as Jay-Z had made guest appearances. He also conducted his own countdown of the Top 20 Hip-Hop/R&B hits of the week throughout the show.

He replaced Star and Buc Wild on WWPR "Power 1051 FM" New York in 2006 with a temporary morning show, Live With Tigger with Egypt & Donnell Rawlings.

He returned to WPGC 95.5 FM in 2007 as their weekday afternoon drive host (2pm-6pm). On April 12, 2010, Morgan took over for Donnie Simpson as the weekday morning show host on WPGC-FM from 6am-10am.

Big Tigger and WPGC agreed to part ways on December 22, 2011.

In January 2013, he took over the afternoon drive time slot (2pm-6PM) on WPGC's sister station, WVEE, in Atlanta. As of August 2020, he took over hosting duties of the morning drive slot on WVEE.

== Additional credits ==
Morgan began his rap career when he was featured on "Snake", a top-20 song from R. Kelly's 2003 album, 'Chocolate Factory' and a hidden track on Ginuwine's 2003 album The Senior. He boasts numerous vocal cameo appearances on albums for hip-hop artists including Method Man, O.G.C., Redman, Too Short and Pete Rock. In 2001, Big Tigger demonstrated his lyrical prowess on Jordan Brand's promotional CD-rom, which accompanied the Air Jordan 17 basketball shoes.

The announcing and ring introductions in Fight Night 2004, a boxing video game developed by EA Sports, were recorded by him. Big Tigger's commentating character can also be unlocked in the game as a playable middleweight fighter (cheat code activation required).

He also works as the resident DJ at Atlanta Falcons games & the PA announcer at Atlanta Hawks games.

=== Appearances ===
- 2009: "If You Don't Know Now You Know" (with Busta Rhymes) on (Back on My B.S.) (iTunes only)
- 2023: "If You Don't Know Now You Know Pt. 2" (with Busta Rhymes) on (Blockbusta)

== Television ==
On April 3, 2010, Morgan hit the small screen again hosting the urban entertainment program Direct Access with Big Tigger. The show is produced in Washington, DC and highlights what is happening in entertainment, sports, music and DC nightlife. It includes interviews with celebrities in sports and entertainment and the hottest music videos. Direct Access with Big Tigger also features a gossip segment brought by model Katie Rost. The show can be seen on DC50-TV/WDCW on Saturdays at 11pm with encores on Fridays at 11:30pm and on WPHL-TV Sundays at 12am.

== Legal issues ==
On June 20, 2026, Morgan was arrested on battery and cruelty to children charges after he allegedly grabbed his wife, Alicia Brown, while attempting to calm her down during a heated argument over text messages he reportedly sent to a female co-worker and shoved her headfirst into the door of his office at their home in Sandy Springs, Georgia. A deep cut would be found above Brown's left eye, with a small bruise also being found on her lower lip, with deep cut also being found on her. The cut above her eye would also result in Brown being hospitalized. The couple's 13 year old son was home at the time of the incident. Morgan was released after posting a $10,000 bond.
