= Write Me Back =

Studio album by R. Kelly
- Released: June 25, 2012
- Recorded: July–November 2011
- Studio: Sylvester Stone; The Chocolate Factory (Chicago); Milkboy (Philadelphia)
- Length: 46:20
- Label: RCA
- Producer: R. Kelly; Warryn Campbell; Big Makk; J. LBS

R. Kelly chronology
Love Letter (2010)	Write Me Back (2012)	Black Panties (2013)

Alternate cover
- Deluxe edition cover

Singles from Write Me Back
- 1. "Share My Love" Released: February 1, 2012; 2. "Feelin' Single" Released: May 29, 2012; 3. "When a Man Lies" Released: October 15, 2012

Write Me Back is the eleventh studio album by American R&B singer, songwriter, and producer R. Kelly. Released on June 25, 2012, by RCA Records, it was written and produced primarily by Kelly as the follow-up to his 2010 album Love Letter, with recording taking place at Sylvester Stone Studios, The Chocolate Factory (both in Chicago), and MilkBoy The Studio (in Philadelphia). Expanding on Love Letter's traditional R&B mode, the album incorporates musical influences from Philadelphia soul and Chicago stepping in songs about love, its redemptive power, and its complications.

Debuting at number five on the Billboard 200, Write Me Back registered sales of 68,000 copies in its first week and went on to chart for 16 more weeks, eventually reaching more than 141,000 copies sold in the US. It was promoted with the release of three singles, including "Share My Love" and "Feelin' Single". Critically, Write Me Back was generally well received, earning praise for its musical arrangements and Kelly's vocal stylings in particular.

== Background ==
At the end of his supporting tour for Love Letter, Kelly underwent emergency throat surgery in July 2011 to drain an abscess on one of his tonsils. He recovered, and in August, announced that his next album will be called Black Panties, a sexually charged album in the same vein of his 1993 debut album, 12 Play. However, he deviated from that plan in January 2012 by announcing Write Me Back as his next album. He recorded the album at Sylvester Stone Studios and The Chocolate Factory in Chicago, and at MilkBoy The Studio in Philadelphia.

== Music and lyrics ==
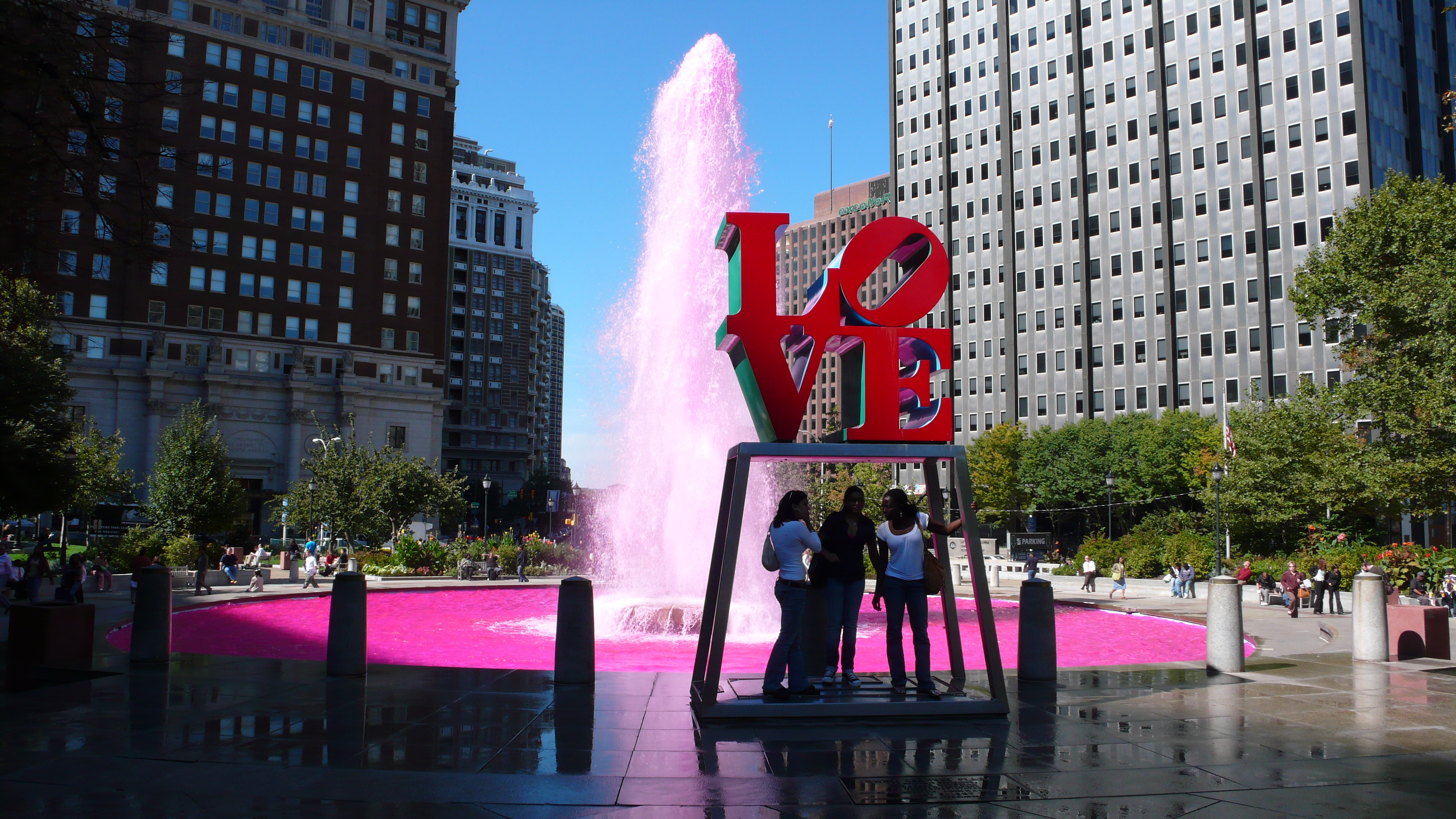
Love Park in Philadelphia; the album was recorded partly in the city and draws on its era of soul music alongside themes of love.

Write Me Back expands on its predecessor's traditional R&B aesthetic with 1970s influences, particularly Philadelphia soul and elements of Chicago stepping. Its title is a reference to that album's title. The music is also characterized by uptempo drum programming and smooth keyboard lines. Nitush Abebe of New York observes "frictionless glide and delicacy, all the strings and horns caressing around the margins, of late-seventies Philly soul greats and Quincy Jones productions." The album's primary subject matter is love, with exhortations about its redemptive power and its complications. Abebe writes of this theme, "There's love as inspiration and redemption, love as strangled by manipulative men or undercommitted women, love as universal party, love as rotted from the inside by apathy or envy."

"Share My Love" is an uptempo song with Philadelphia soul-styled strings. It has a pop-R&B style similar to that of Michael Jackson's 1979 album Off the Wall. The song has a theme of romance and tongue-in-cheek lyrics: "Populate / Let's get together / Populate". "Green Light" has a quiet storm style and low-key mood. It is about a man wanting to please a woman who has a negligent boyfriend. "Feelin' Single" is about the "liminal sense of having checked out of a relationship and started looking around for escape routes." Kelly sings in a high register on the song, which Greg Kot views "evok[es] the boyish innocence of a Michael Jackson over a stepping dance groove accented with finger snaps."

"Feelin' Single"
The song is a kiss-off by the narrator to his increasingly uninterested lover. Its chord progression is sampled from Bill Withers' 1977 song "Lovely Day".

"Believe in Me" is told from the perspective of a lover about to leave his woman for a prison term and asks for patience and support. Miles Marshall Lewis views that the song "embod[ies] elements of the (oft-downtrodden) blue-collar African-American experience." "Lady Sunday" is a dance-oriented, orchestrated song with musical similarities to early 1970s Harold Melvin and the Blue Notes. "Believe That It's So" features disco strings, assertive brass, and a narrative that celebrates love's ability to help people overcome adversity before celebrating celebration in general, as Kelly sings about becoming drunk and needing to draw on love to overcome his impending hangover. Deviating from the album's 1970s influence, "All Rounds on Me" has rockabilly elements and an alternating blues arrangement.

== Marketing and sales ==
Write Me Back was marketed with the release of two singles. The lead single, "Share My Love", was released on February 1, 2012, and became a number-one hit on urban adult radio. It peaked at number 13 on the US Billboard Hot R&B/Hip-Hop Songs, on which it has charted for 20 weeks. It also charted at number 72 on the Japan Hot 100. The second single, "Feelin' Single", was released as a digital download on May 29. It reached number 43 on the Billboard Hot R&B/Hip-Hop Songs. The album was released by RCA Records on June 25 in the United Kingdom and on June 26 in the United States. It is his first album for RCA, after RCA Music Group shut down Kelly's former label Jive Records. The album's deluxe edition included four additional songs.

On June 27, 2012, Kelly became ill from complications related to his 2011 throat surgery. Consequently, his promotional appearances on Late Night with Jimmy Fallon and Today were cancelled. Although his status for subsequent promotional efforts was uncertain, Kelly performed at Reggae Sumfest on July 20, and performed on Late Night with Jimmy Fallon after rescheduling for July 23. "When a Man Lies" later impacted urban adult radio as the album's third and final single on October 15.

In the United Kingdom, Write Me Back debuted at number 80 on the UK Albums Chart in the week of July 7, 2012. In the United States, Write Me Back debuted at number 5 on the US Billboard 200, selling 68,000 copies in its first week. It was Kelly's lowest first-week sales since 12 Play in 1993. The album sold 24,600 copies in its second week on the chart, falling 14 spots to number 19. Pop It ultimately charted for 17 weeks on the US Billboard 200. As reported on August 15, 2012, the album had sold 500,000 copies in the United States.

== Critical reception ==
Professional ratings
Review scores
Source	Rating
Allmusic	3.5/5 stars
Chicago Tribune	3/4 stars
Entertainment Weekly	A−
The Independent	4/5 stars
Los Angeles Times	3/4 stars
NME	6/10
Pitchfork	6.5/10
Rolling Stone	3.5/5 stars
Slant Magazine	2/5 stars
Spin	7/10

Write Me Back was met with generally positive reviews. At Metacritic, which assigns a normalized rating out of 100 to reviews from professional critics, the album received an average score of 73, based on 18 reviews. August Brown of the Los Angeles Times dubbed it "the best grown-man dance record of the year" and stated, "the songwriting is, per usual at this point in his career, nimble and nicely matured. But the arrangements are the centerpiece here." Jody Rosen of Rolling Stone called its music "virtuoso pastiche – but Kelly's Seventies are freakier than your dad's." Maura Johnston of The Village Voice viewed "Clipped Wings" as its strongest track and compared the album to Love Letter, stating "it's slightly less drenched in retro tropes, but it's no less of an enjoyable listen." Miles Marshall Lewis of Spin felt that "the result distills the melodies and lyrical flair fans love without the NC-17 lines that often make Kelly NSFW."

Andy Gill of The Independent found Kelly "even more at home" musically than on Love Letter and stated, "for all his production skills, he remains first and foremost a vocal stylist of considerable ability". Thomas Conner of the Chicago Sun-Times complimented Kelly's "superb voice" and noted the Philadelphia soul influence as "a much more natural fit for Kelly's considerable vocal gifts and lusty one-track mind." Allmusic's Andy Kellman complimented the music's "warmth and joy" and stated, "It's apparent that he can be retro and urbane as instinctively as he can be cutting edge and filthy." Nitsuh Abebe of New York commended Kelly for "nailing each voice and narrative" and stated, "He comes at every idea like an impassioned pro, and whether that idea is making people melt, grind, or titter in disbelief, it’s usually his ardor that’s having that effect."

In a mixed review, Jon Caramanica of The New York Times dubbed the album Kelly's "least ambitious" and found it "tepid" by his standards, "which is to say, completely technically accomplished, but lacking the snakelike vocal slither and moist subject matter that mark him at his most virtuosic." Slant Magazine's Eric Henderson panned its music as "this-porridge-is-just-right uptempo mush" and questioned its genuineness, writing that "even if the songs sound like the height of artifice ... there's little doubt [Kelly] believes in his own hollow offerings." Pitchfork Media's Jess Harvell observed "a fine line between breezy and half-assed" in the songwriting and criticized its "cut-rate production choices" behind "Kelly's engaged vocal performances." Greg Kot of the Chicago Tribune called it "a less-consistently strong sequel" and stated, "Listeners may find themselves toggling between questioning Kelly’s sincerity and admiring his facility as a producer and singer." Spin ranked Write Me Back number 37 on their list of 2012's best albums.

== Track listing ==
Write Me Back track listing
No.	Title	Writer(s)	Producer(s)	Length
1.	"Love Is"	Robert Kelly	R. Kelly	3:30
2.	"Feelin' Single"	R. Kelly	R. Kelly, Bigg Makk	3:29
3.	"Lady Sunday"	R. Kelly	R. Kelly	3:37
4.	"When a Man Lies"	R. Kelly	R. Kelly	3:36
5.	"Clipped Wings"	Kelly, Campbell	R. Kelly, Warryn Campbell	3:18
6.	"Believe That It's So"	R. Kelly	R. Kelly	6:09
7.	"Fool for You"	R. Kelly	R. Kelly	3:37
8.	"All Rounds on Me"	Kelly, Mays	R. Kelly, Bigg Makk	4:13
9.	"Believe in Me"	R. Kelly	R. Kelly, J. LBS	3:55
10.	"Green Light"	R. Kelly	R. Kelly	3:52
11.	"Party Jumpin'"	R. Kelly	R. Kelly	3:17
12.	"Share My Love"	R. Kelly	R. Kelly	3:43

Deluxe edition bonus tracks
No.	Title	Writer(s)	Producer(s)	Length
13.	"Beautiful in the Mirror"	R. Kelly	R. Kelly	3:30
14.	"You Are My World"	R. Kelly	R. Kelly	3:20
15.	"Fallin' from the Sky"	R. Kelly, Daniel Coriglie, Mario Bakovic, Dennis-manuel Peters	R. Kelly	3:56
16.	"One Step Closer"	R. Kelly	R. Kelly	6:00

== Personnel ==
Credits are taken from the album's liner notes.

- Akua Auset – make-up
- Davis Barnett – viola
- Bigg Makk – bass, composer, guitar, keyboards, producer, programming
- Warryn Campbell – composer, producer
- Ann Carli – consultant
- Jeff Chestek – horn engineer, string engineer
- Eliza Cho – violin
- Cody Cichowski – assistant
- James Cooper – celli
- Carl Cox Jr. – tenor saxophone
- DJ Wayne Williams – A&R
- Rodney East – keyboards
- Ghislaine Fleischmann – violin
- Meghan Foley – art direction
- Yvonne Gage – choir / chorus
- Abel Garibaldi – engineer, programming
- Donna E. Gay – choir / chorus
- Serban Ghenea – mixing
- Larry Gold – conductor, horn arrangements, string arrangements
- John Hanes – engineer
- Pastor Chris Harris – choir / chorus
- Mike Harvey – choir / chorus
- John Haynes – Pro Tools
- Jonathan Kim – viola
- Olga Konopelsky – violin
- J. LBS – producer
- Donnie Lyle – bass, guitar, musical director
- Paul Mabin – choir / chorus
- Luigi Mazzochi – violin
- Ian Mereness – engineer, programming
- Jesús Morales – celli
- Jeffrey Morrow – choir / chorus
- Lauren Pilot Morrow – choir / chorus
- Chiquita Oden – grooming
- Herb Powers Jr. – mastering
- R. Kelly – arranger, composer, horn arrangements, keyboards, mixing, producer, string arrangements, vocals
- Robin Robinson – choir / chorus
- April Roomet – stylist
- Carlos Rubio – violin
- Phil Seaford – assistant engineer
- StarrBie – background vocals
- Randee St. Nicholas – photography
- Gregory Teperman – violin
- Jarred Antonacci – trombone
- Steve Tirpak – trombone
- Cheryl Wilson – choir / chorus
- Daniel Wright – trumpet

== Charts ==
=== Weekly charts ===
Weekly chart performance for Write Me Back
Chart (2012)	Peak position
Belgian Albums (Ultratop Wallonia)	151
Canadian R&B Albums (Nielsen SoundScan)	18
Dutch Albums (Album Top 100)	32
French Albums (SNEP)	120
South African Albums (RiSA) (RiSA)	6
Swedish Albums (Sverigetopplistan)	54
UK Albums (OCC)	80
UK R&B Albums (OCC)	11
US Billboard 200	5
US Top R&B/Hip-Hop Albums (Billboard)	2

=== Year-end charts ===
2012 year-end chart performance for Write Me Back
Chart (2012)	Position
US Billboard 200	151
US Top R&B/Hip-Hop Albums (Billboard)	33

2013 year-end chart performance for Write Me Back
Chart (2013)	Position
US Top R&B/Hip-Hop Albums (Billboard)	78
