= Hotel (Cassidy song) =

2003 single by Cassidy

Single by Cassidy featuring R. Kelly

from the album Split Personality
- B-side: "Take It"
- Released: September 29, 2003
- Genre: Hip hop
- Length: 4:07
- Label: J; Full Surface
- Songwriters: Barry Reese; Kasseem Dean; Robert Kelly; Bernard Edwards; Nile Rodgers
- Producer: Swizz Beatz

Cassidy singles chronology
| "Hotel" (2003) | "Get No Better" (2004) |

R. Kelly singles chronology
| "Thoia Thoing" (2003) | "Hotel" (2003) | "Step in the Name of Love (Remix)" (2003) |

"Hotel" is a song by American rapper Cassidy, released by J Records and Swizz Beatz's Full Surface Records as his commercial debut single on September 29, 2003. The song also serves as the lead single from his debut album, Split Personality. Containing replayed elements from the Sugarhill Gang's "Rapper's Delight", "Hotel" was produced by Swizz Beatz and features R. Kelly on featured vocals. The song reached number four on the US Billboard Hot 100 and number three on the UK Singles Chart.

== Remix ==
The official remix of the song, the "Vacation" remix, features R. Kelly singing a new intro along with new lyrics on the chorus. The remix also features American rapper Trina on the second verse, as well as new verses by Cassidy. The remix was included as the final track from Cassidy's debut album, Split Personality. Another version featuring Kool Savas was also recorded and included on one of the European maxi-CD singles, including a remix by Cuban Link which was included on Broken Chains 2: Chainsaw Massacre.

== Track listings ==
US 12-inch single

A1. "Hotel" (main mix) – 4:38
A2. "Hotel" (instrumental) – 4:38
B1. "Hotel" (club mix) – 4:44
B2. "Hotel" (acappella) – 4:36

UK and European CD single

1. "Hotel" (featuring R. Kelly) – 4:07
2. "Take It" – 3:04

UK 12-inch single and Australian CD single

1. "Hotel" (featuring R. Kelly) – 4:07
2. "Hotel" (Vacation remix featuring R. Kelly and Trina) – 4:10 (5:46 in Australia)
3. "Hotel" (Vacation remix instrumental version) – 4:00 (5:06 in Australia)
4. "Take It" – 3:04

European maxi-CD single 1

1. "Hotel" (featuring R. Kelly) – 4:07
2. "Hotel" (Vacation remix featuring R. Kelly and Trina) – 5:46
3. "Take It" (dirty version) – 3:04
4. "Hotel" (featuring R. Kelly and Kool Savas) – 4:07

European maxi-CD single 2

1. "Hotel" (featuring R. Kelly) – 4:07
2. "Hotel" (Vacation remix featuring R. Kelly and Trina) – 5:46
3. "Take It" – 3:04
4. "Hotel" (instrumental version) – 4:38

== Charts ==
=== Weekly charts ===
| Chart (2004) | Peak position |
|---|---|
| Australia (ARIA) | 25 |
| Australian Urban (ARIA) | 8 |
| Belgium (Ultratip Bubbling Under Flanders) | 16 |
| Denmark (Tracklisten) | 11 |
| Europe (Eurochart Hot 100) | 11 |
| Germany (GfK) | 22 |
| Ireland (IRMA) | 16 |
| Netherlands (Single Top 100) | 70 |
| Scotland Singles (Official Charts) | 8 |
| Sweden (Sverigetopplistan) | 24 |
| Switzerland (Schweizer Hitparade) | 28 |
| UK Singles (Official Charts) | 3 |
| UK Hip Hop/R&B (Official Charts) | 1 |
| US Billboard Hot 100 | 4 |
| US Hot R&B/Hip-Hop Songs (Billboard) | 6 |
| US Hot Rap Songs (Billboard) | 2 |
| US Pop Airplay (Billboard) | 10 |
| US Rhythmic Airplay (Billboard) | 5 |

=== Year-end charts ===
| Chart (2004) | Position |
|---|---|
| Germany (Media Control GfK) | 72 |
| UK Singles (OCC) | 38 |
| UK Urban (Music Week) | 5 |
| US Billboard Hot 100 | 32 |
| US Hot R&B/Hip-Hop Singles & Tracks (Billboard) | 26 |
| US Hot Rap Tracks (Billboard) | 14 |
| US Mainstream Top 40 (Billboard) | 61 |
| US Rhythmic Top 40 (Billboard) | 23 |

== Certifications ==
| Region | Certification | Certified units/sales |
|---|---|---|
| United Kingdom (BPI) | Silver | 200,000^{‡} |
^{‡} Sales+streaming figures based on certification alone.

== Release history ==
| Region | Date | Format(s) | Label(s) | Ref. |
|---|---|---|---|---|
| United States | September 29, 2003 | Rhythmic contemporary; urban radio | J; Full Surface | |
| United States | January 26, 2004 | Contemporary hit radio | J; Full Surface | |
| United Kingdom | May 17, 2004 | 12-inch vinyl; CD | J; Full Surface | |
