= Manika (singer) =

American singer (born 1993)

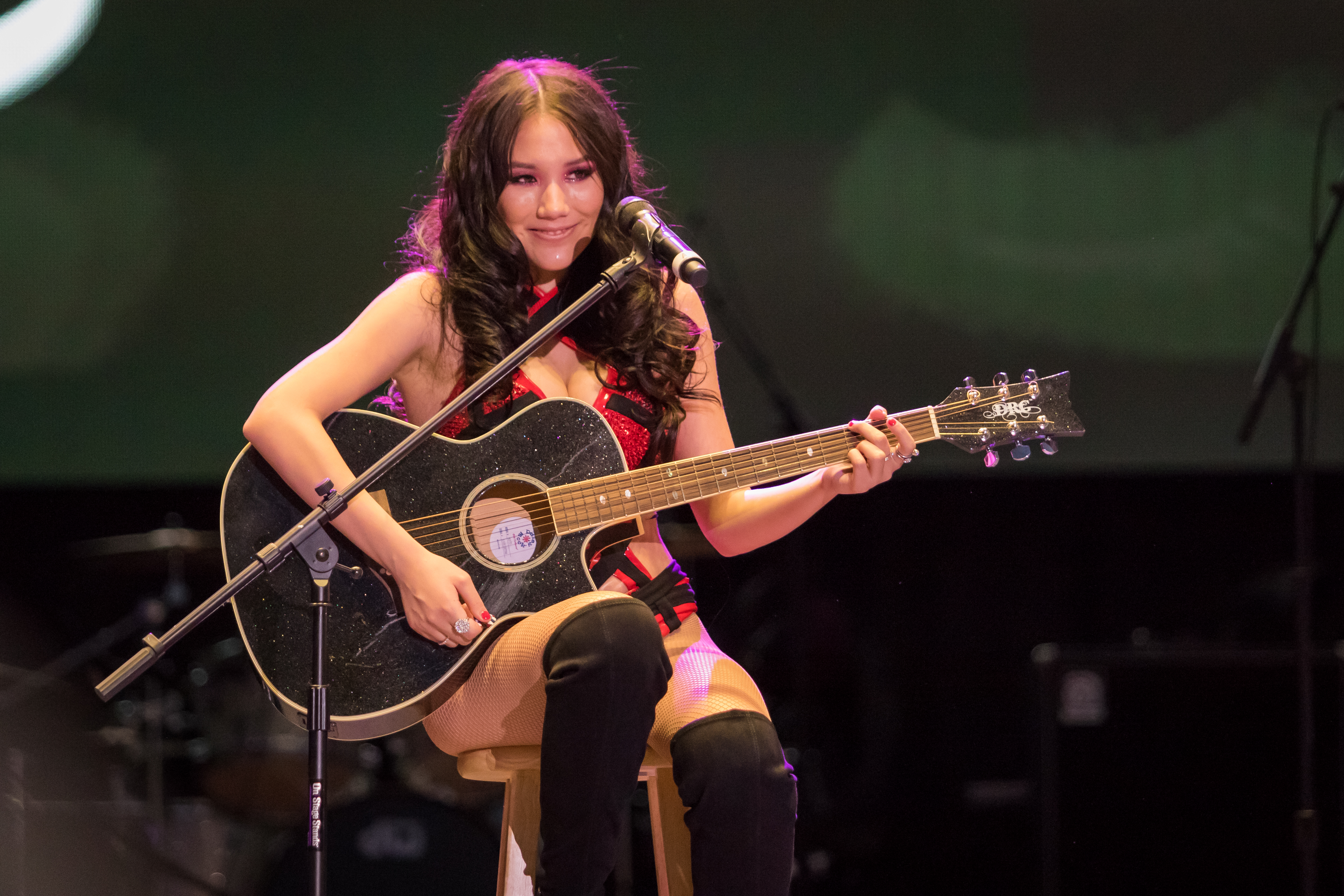
- Manika performing at Wine Amplified music festival in MGM Las Vegas.

Background information
- Born: Manika Grace Ward; August 2, 1992 (age 34)
- Origin: Las Vegas, Nevada, U.S.
- Genres: Pop; hip hop
- Occupations: Singer, songwriter, rapper, TV-Host, author
- Years active: 2010–present
- Label: Wamaframa
- Website: manika-music.com

Manika Grace Ward (born August 2, 1992), known professionally as Manika (/məˈniːkə/ mə-NEE-kə), is an American singer, songwriter, rapper, TV-Host, and author.

== Early life and education ==
Manika was born in Las Vegas to Grace Ward and Wallace Ward in 1992. She described herself in 2011 interview with Las Vegas Review-Journal as "part Filipino, part Japanese, part Chinese, part Malaysian and part Spanish".

As a child, she taught herself to play the piano and guitar. Aged 17, Manika graduated as valedictorian from Henderson International School in Henderson, Nevada. At 15, she also wrote a book, The Exciting Adventures of Boo and donated proceeds to the ASPCA Animal Shelter.

== Career ==
Aged 17, music executive Frank DiLeo noticed her after she received several awards at New York City's National Performing Arts Festival. Under DiLeo's supervision, she released several singles. In 2009, she published "Boyz R Dumb". In 2011 she collaborated with rapper Lil Twist on "Just Can't Let You Go". Also in 2011, she worked with music coach CeCe Sammy, whom she met through a shared friend.

Her manager DiLeo died in 2011 after cardiac surgery. In 2012 she toured with One Direction across North America as their opening act. In 2012 Manika also performed at KIIS-FM's Wango Tango. In 2013, Manika published her debut album, Manika Double Album; associated singles included "Good Girls" and "My Way".

In a 2011 interview with the magazine Latina, she said her musical inspirations were Avril Lavigne, Pink, and Alanis Morissette.

In 2014, Manika released her fourth single "Vegas Party". She performed this song at Las Vegas nightclubs including Hakkasan nightclub at MGM Grand and Light nightclub at Mandalay Bay. Manika's fifth single was released in 2015 "B.Y.O.Bugatti", which peaked at number 12 on the U.S. Hot Single Sales Chart by Billboard. In 2015, Manika also performed on the main stage at the Wine Amplified music festival in Las Vegas.

Later that year she released a collaboration with rapper Tyga, "I Might Go Lesbian", which peaked at number 15 on the Billboard U.S. Hot Single Sales Chart. The title of the song has been retroactively changed, first to "I Might Go..." and later to "I Might Go (love a) Lesbian". In 2016 Manika released her single "How Can I Love" which charted higher than any of her other singles at number 7 in Billboard Sales. Manika is also the host for reality-TV series "Global Beauty Masters" (students) that airs on TLC TV network and Discovery Life, in the U.S., and in over 25 countries in North and South America including Mexico, Canada and the Caribbean.

In 2016, Manika launched her own radio show "Manika's Love Line" on Dash Radio.

Manika is the TV host of The Look All Stars "The Social Corner", on The CW. The Look All Stars also stars Tori Spelling.

== Discography ==
=== Album ===
- MANIKA Double Album (2013)

=== EP ===
- The Middle of Hollywood

=== Singles ===
- "Just Can't Let You Go (feat. Lil Twist)" (2011), number 21 on Billboard Hot Single Sales
- "Good Girls" (2012)
- "My Way" (2013)
- "Vegas Party" (2014)
- "B.Y.O.Bugatti" (2015), number 12 on Billboard Hot Single Sales
- "I Might Go Lesbian (feat. Tyga)" (2015), number 15 on Billboard Hot Single Sales
- "How Can I Love" (2016), number 7 on Billboard Hot Single Sales
