= Ignition (Remix) =

2002 single by R. Kelly

Single by R. Kelly

from the album Chocolate Factory
- B-side: "Apologies of a Thug"; "What Do I Do"
- Released: October 22, 2002
- Recorded: 2002
- Studio: Rock Land Studios (Chicago, IL) (both original and remix versions); Chicago Recording Company (Chicago, IL) (original version)
- Genre: R&B
- Length: 3:16 (original version); 3:09 (remix); 6:25 (full version)
- Label: Jive
- Songwriter: Robert Kelly
- Producer: R. Kelly

R. Kelly singles chronology
"Take You Home with Me a.k.a. Body" (2002)	"Ignition (Remix)" (2002)	"Snake" (2003)

"Ignition (Remix)" is a song written and produced by American R&B singer R. Kelly. It was released in 2002 as the lead single from his sixth studio album Chocolate Factory (2003). It is viewed as one of his most well-known songs and was a major hit in the United States, Europe, and Oceania.

"Ignition (Remix)" peaked at number two on the Billboard Hot 100 for five consecutive weeks. Outside the United States, the song topped the charts in Australia, New Zealand, the Republic of Ireland and the United Kingdom. It was later included on the updated version of Rolling Stone's 500 greatest songs of all time in 2010 at number 494. The song was listed at number 19 on Pitchfork Media's top 500 songs of the 2000s.

== Background ==
The original song "Ignition" was first recorded in 2002 after the alleged statutory rape tape was a hot topic in the media. The original "Ignition" was written for Kelly’s planned album Loveland; after the album was leaked, Kelly renamed Loveland as Chocolate Factory, a record with several new songs and remixes. "Ignition", one of the songs he decided to remix, had its original ending shifted to the intro.

On Genius, Kelly explained the song: "First of all it was an old, old track that I had in my computer for a long time. When I pulled it up, for some reason I just heard “ignition” on it, so I start really just messing with the words and a lot of metaphors start coming to me. You know “trying to get you to my hotel/ you must be a football coach/ the way you got me playing the field/ So baby give me that “toot toot, that beep beep.” You know what I mean? Just basically having fun with the song from there, once I tapped into the metaphor of it." In a 2016 interview, Kelly claimed that he wrote the basis of "Ignition (Remix)", including the main lyric of the refrain, approximately five years before he wrote the song called "Ignition".

== Song structure ==
The song is sometimes called simply "Ignition" colloquially and for marketing purposes, including as the title of one of its releases as a single and on the Billboard charts. While it shares the song title with the original version of "Ignition", the remix version is most commonly referred to in writing to avoid confusion with the original. The two songs share some instrumental elements (guitars and percussion) but are otherwise completely different.

The original "Ignition" was released first to urban contemporary radio stations although it never officially charted on Billboard in this manner at first. At the end of the song, Kelly gives the listeners "a lil' preview of the remix", which includes only the first verse then fades out. The "remix to Ignition" was released weeks later to urban and Top 40 pop stations, and it gained significantly more attention. While many stations never played the original but opted for the remix only, others played both songs, merged, at six minutes total; it was structured that way on the Chocolate Factory album.

The song contains a minor sample from the intro of R. Kelly's 2001 hit song "Fiesta (Remix)". Additionally, the original version opens with the same spoken-word intro that originally appeared in his earlier hit "You Remind Me of Something".

== Music video ==
The music video was directed by Bille Woodruff. It was shot in a club where Kelly is seen wearing a Boston Celtics jersey. The club is meant to be the inside of a stretch Club Hummer limousine. Kelly is also seen in a different part of the club wearing a white fur coat. Nick Cannon appears in the music video, and DJ. David N. Feldman makes a cameo as the dancing white hipster. Ken Foree also makes a cameo.

== Critical reception ==
The remix received positive reviews from both critics and fans upon release. The remix was included on the updated version of Rolling Stone's 500 greatest songs of all time in 2010 at number 494. The song was listed at number 19 on Pitchfork Media's top 500 songs of the 2000s.

== Chart performance ==
"Ignition (Remix)" was a huge success for Kelly. In the United States, it peaked at number two on the Billboard Hot 100 for five consecutive weeks from March 29 to April 26, 2003. It became his most successful song in the United States in the 2000s. In the United Kingdom, the song debuted and peaked at the top of the UK Singles Chart, where it remained for four weeks, becoming Kelly's second number-one song in Britain after "I Believe I Can Fly" in April 1997. In April 2013, a decade after its initial release, "Ignition (Remix)" re-entered the UK Singles Chart at number 43. "Ignition (Remix)" also topped the charts in Australia, Ireland, New Zealand. The song also peaked at number two on the 2003 Billboard Year-End Chart. Due to the success of this song and other songs by Kelly the same year, this also made him number two on the "Year End Best Artist" chart.

== Live performances ==
Kelly often performed "Ignition (Remix)" at events and concerts; he sang this song three times at the BET Awards show (2003, 2004 and 2013). In 2013, R. Kelly surprised the crowd at the music festival Coachella coming in to the stage and performing a mash-up between "Ignition (Remix)" and "1901" with French rock band Phoenix; a year later, Kelly again surprised the crowd with the song, this time at Lollapalooza with Chance the Rapper.

== Track listing ==
- Digital download
1. "Ignition (Remix)" – 3:09

== Credits and personnel ==
Credits adapted from AllMusic.

- Robert Kelly – composer, creative director, producer, primary artist

== Charts ==
=== Weekly charts ===
Chart (2003)	Peak position
Australia (ARIA)	1
Australian Urban (ARIA)	1
Belgium (Ultratop 50 Flanders)	42
Belgium (Ultratip Bubbling Under Wallonia)	2
Canada CHR (Nielsen BDS)	2
France (SNEP)	38
Germany (GfK)	36
Ireland (IRMA)	1
Netherlands (Dutch Top 40)	18
Netherlands (Single Top 100)	12
New Zealand (Recorded Music NZ)	1
Scotland Singles (Official Charts)	1
Sweden (Sverigetopplistan)	46
UK Singles (Official Charts)	1
UK Indie (Official Charts)	1
UK Hip Hop/R&B (Official Charts)	1
US Billboard Hot 100	2
US Hot R&B/Hip-Hop Songs (Billboard)	2
US Pop Airplay (Billboard)	1
US Rhythmic Airplay (Billboard)	1
US Top 40 Tracks (Billboard)	1

=== Year-end charts ===
Chart (2003)	Position
Australia (ARIA)	10
Ireland (IRMA)	4
Netherlands (Single Top 100)	81
New Zealand (RIANZ)	18
UK Singles (OCC)	3
US Billboard Hot 100	2
US Hot R&B/Hip-Hop Singles & Tracks (Billboard)	2

=== Decade-end charts ===
Chart (2000–2009)	Position
UK Singles (OCC)	76
US Billboard Hot 100	74

== Certifications ==
Region	Certification	Certified units/sales
Australia (ARIA)	Platinum	70,000^{^}
Denmark (IFPI Danmark)	Gold	45,000^{‡}
New Zealand (RMNZ)	4× Platinum	120,000^{‡}
United Kingdom (BPI)	3× Platinum	767,829
^{^} Shipments figures based on certification alone.^{‡} Sales+streaming figures based on certification alone.

== Soundtrack appearances ==
The song has been featured in the films Love Don't Cost a Thing (2003), Soul Plane (2004) and 30 Minutes or Less (2011).

The song is in the episode "The Gang Group Dates" on the sitcom It's Always Sunny in Philadelphia.

The song is featured in the Ubisoft Just Dance series of games, on The Hip Hop Dance Experience (2012).

== Cover versions ==
=== Recorded covers ===
- German hip-hop group K.I.Z covered the song with entirely new (German language) lyrics, as "Was willst du machen?" ("What do you want to do?"), on their 2006 mixtape Böhse Enkelz.
- Alain Clark covered the song on the 2011 album De Wereld Draait Door Recordings.
- Jinja Safari covered the song for the 2012 compilation album Triple J: Like a Version, Volume 8.
- In 2013, the band Rixton covered the song and released an official music video of the band performing it. They later performed it on The Ellen DeGeneres Show and other shows.
- The Wind and The Wave released a cover of the song in 2015.dian

=== Television and radio performances ===
- In 2010, Lucas Cruickshank covered the song in Fred: The Movie called Beep, Beep
- In 2011, The Dartmouth Aires covered the song on the talent show The Sing-Off.
- In 2014, The Ragtime Gals (Jimmy Fallon and others) did a barbershop quartet version of this song which they performed on The Tonight Show Starring Jimmy Fallon.
- In 2014, A Great Big World covered the song on the show On Air with Ryan Seacrest; this also happens to be Ryan Seacrest's favorite song.
- In 2014, "Catfish and the Bottlemen" covered the song along with Read My Mind by The Killers for 'Like a Version' on the Australian radio show Triple J.
- In 2014, Jess Glynne has covered the song on BBC 1Xtra Live Lounge and other radio stations.
- In 2017, Miley Cyrus sang a bluegrass-style version of this song on The Tonight Show Starring Jimmy Fallon as part of the Musical Genre Challenge.

=== Live covers ===
- In 2011, Joseph Gordon-Levitt covered the song live in front of a crowd.
- In 2013, Tyler Hilton and Teddy Geiger covered the song on their live show.
- In 2014, Maroon 5 lead vocalist Adam Levine covered this song at The Voice coaches concert; the song is also one of his favorite songs.
- In 2014, British singer Robbie Williams featured a comical a cappella version of the song, very similar in style to the Tonight Show barbershop quartet version, as part of his Swings Both Ways Live tour.

Other artists who have covered the song include Ed Sheeran and Bruno Mars.

=== Web video ===
- In 2012, Young the Giant covered the song for the website The A.V. Club's "A.V. Undercover" series.
- In 2013, James Dalby covered the song on YouTube, which later became popular.
- In 2015, Postmodern Jukebox covered the song with Rayvon Owen on vocals.

=== Mashups ===
- In 2008, band Fall Out Boy covered the song as a mash-up with "Don't Matter" by Akon on their album Live in Phoenix.
- In 2013, British band The Vamps covered the song as a mash-up with "Why'd You Only Call Me When You're High" on BBC Radio 1.
- In 2014, AJR sang a mash-up of "All About That Bass" and "Ignition (Remix)", in New York City.
- Phoebe Ryan's song "Ignition/Do You", from her 2015 EP Mine, is a mash-up of "Ignition (Remix)" and Miguel's song "Do You...".

=== Parodies ===
The sketch comedy show Chappelle's Show had a 2003 skit parodying the R. Kelly sex tape, which consisted of music videos for the fictional songs "Piss on You" and "Piss on You (Remix)". "Piss on You" parodied the 2001 R. Kelly song "Feelin' on Yo Booty", while "Piss on You (Remix)" parodied "Ignition (Remix)".

=== Samples and interpolations ===
- "Don't Matter", by Akon on his 2006 album Konvicted, borrows the melody of "Ignition (Remix)" in its verse.
- "Lose You" by Drake from his 2017 project More Life quotes lyrics from "Ignition (Remix)" in one of its verses. Three songs later on More Life, the track "Since Way Back" interpolates another of R. Kelly's songs, "Clipped Wings", while the chorus name-checks Kelly directly.
- "Ignition" by Tory Lanez on his 2017 mixtape Chixtape 4, uses the sample of the original "Ignition".

== Other legacy ==
A portion of Michael Jackson's Private Home Movies, a 2003 compilation of home movies which Jackson recorded throughout his life and narrated, showed him dancing to "Ignition (Remix)" in the back of Brett Ratner's car during a 2003 vacation in Miami, Florida. Kelly, who claimed to have been unsuccessfully asked by Jackson to write a song similar to "Ignition (Remix)" for Jackson's use, later stated in 2009 after having seen the clip on the Web that "I cried when I first saw it on YouTube[...]I've written a lot of songs, I've been around the world, and I've won all kinds of awards and everything else, but[...]nothing told me, I didn't know I had made it until I saw Michael Jackson in the back of that car singing and dancing to my song 'Ignition'. That's when it became official. I've been in the business for over 20 years, but that's when it became official to me that Kels is here, baby."

In March 2013, a petition was launched on We the People requesting that the U.S. national anthem be changed from "The Star-Spangled Banner" to "Ignition (Remix)". Referencing the song's lyrics, the petition stated that "We, the undersigned, would like the Obama administration to recognise the need for a new national anthem, one that even a decade after its creation, is still hot and fresh out the kitchen."

== Ignition (Viceroy Remix) ==
"Ignition (Viceroy Remix)"

Single by Viceroy & R. Kelly
- Released: December 2, 2014
- Recorded: 2002 (vocals); 2014 (music)
- Length: 3:43
- Label: RCA
- Songwriter: Robert Kelly
- Producer: Viceroy

R. Kelly singles chronology
"Bump & Grind 2014" (2014)	"Ignition (Viceroy Remix)" (2014)	"Dolo" (2015)

"Ignition (Viceroy Remix)" or "Ignition (Viceroy "Jet Life" Remix)" is a 2014 remix to "Ignition (Remix)", the song was released on iTunes as a single. The remix was made by "Viceroy" as it says on the title. The song was uploaded to R. Kelly's Vevo the same day and also on his Spotify account.

=== Formats and track listings ===
- Digital download
1. "Ignition (Viceroy Remix)" – 3:43
