= Step in the Name of Love =

2003 single by R. Kelly

"Step in the Name of Love" (remix)

Single by R. Kelly

from the album Chocolate Factory
- B-side: "Thoia Thoing"
- Released: September 2, 2003
- Length: 5:42 (album version); 7:12 (remix); 4:29 (radio edit); 5:09 (remix edit)
- Label: Jive; Tavdash
- Songwriter: Robert Kelly
- Producer: R. Kelly

R. Kelly singles chronology
| "Hotel" (2003) | "Step in the Name of Love" (remix) (2003) | "Gigolo" (2003) |

"Step in the Name of Love (Remix)" is a song by American R&B singer R. Kelly. Taken from the fifth studio album, Chocolate Factory (2003), the song became the 10th single from Kelly (and the final one as of 2026) to reach number one on the US Billboard R&B/Hip-Hop chart, and it also peaked at number nine on the Billboard Hot 100. In the United Kingdom, the song was issued as a double A-side with "Thoia Thoing".

The original "Step in the Name of Love", which is on the unreleased 2002 album Loveland as well as the Chocolate Factory album, describes a dance style initially created in Chicago called "stepping". The dance, and the music associated with it, was heavily featured on disc one of his 2004 double album, Happy People/U Saved Me. The song became an impromptu "anthem" for steppers and the dance.

== Critical reception ==
The Village Voice critic Robert Christgau found the remix of "Step in the Name of Love" to be "hugely engaging". However, he believed it was "cavalier" or "stupid" for Kelly, amid his child pornography charges, to declare himself "the pied piper of R&B" given the moniker's "pedophilic implications".

== Chart performance ==
"Step in the Name of Love" took 61 weeks to reach number one on the US Billboard Hot R&B/Hip-Hop Singles & Tracks chart, making it the longest trip to number one in the chart's history. The song has spent 70 weeks on the chart, making it one the longest stays on that chart.

== Music video ==
The music video is directed by Little X.

== Track listing ==
UK CD single

1. "Step in the Name of Love" (remix) (radio edit)
2. "Thoia Thoing" (album version)
3. "Thoia Thoing" (Silk & Peoples Choice remix)
4. "Step in the Name of Love" (remix) (enhanced video)

== Charts ==
=== Weekly charts ===
| Chart (2003) | Peak position |
|---|---|
| Belgium (Ultratip Bubbling Under Flanders) | 4 |
| Belgium (Ultratip Bubbling Under Wallonia) | 7 |
| Germany (GfK) | 69 |
| Netherlands (Dutch Top 40 Tipparade) | 2 |
| Netherlands (Single Top 100) | 48 |
| Scotland Singles (Official Charts) | 34 |
| Switzerland (Schweizer Hitparade) | 83 |
| UK Singles (Official Charts) | 14 |
| UK Hip Hop/R&B (Official Charts) | 6 |
| US Billboard Hot 100 | 9 |
| US Hot R&B/Hip-Hop Songs (Billboard) | 1 |
| US Rhythmic Airplay (Billboard) | 21 |

=== Year-end charts ===
| Chart (2003) | Position |
|---|---|
| US Billboard Hot 100 | 94 |
| US Hot R&B/Hip-Hop Singles & Tracks (Billboard) | 25 |

| Chart (2004) | Position |
|---|---|
| US Billboard Hot 100 | 78 |
| US Hot R&B/Hip-Hop Singles & Tracks (Billboard) | 22 |

== Release history ==
| Region | Date | Format(s) | Label(s) | Ref. |
|---|---|---|---|---|
| United States | September 2, 2003 | Urban radio | Jive; Tavdash | |
| United Kingdom | November 3, 2003 | 12-inch vinyl; CD; cassette | Jive; Tavdash | |
