= The World's Greatest =

2001 single by R. Kelly

Single by R. Kelly

from the album Ali: Original Soundtrack and Loveland
- B-side: "I Decided"
- Released: November 13, 2001
- Length: 4:37
- Label: Interscope (US); Jive (worldwide)
- Songwriter: Robert Kelly
- Producer: R. Kelly

R. Kelly singles chronology
"We Thuggin'" (2001)	"The World's Greatest" (2001)	"Honey" (2002)

"The World's Greatest" is a song written and performed by American R&B singer R. Kelly. The song originally appeared on the soundtrack to the film Ali and also appeared on bootleg copies of Kelly's unreleased album, Loveland, which later became a bonus disc to Chocolate Factory. Released as a single in November 2001, "The World's Greatest" became a hit in Europe, reaching number two in the Netherlands, number four in the United Kingdom, and the top 20 in nine other European countries. In the United States, it peaked at number 34 on the Billboard Hot 100.

== Chart performance ==
The song reached number 31 on the US Billboard Hot R&B/Hip-Hop Singles & Tracks chart. In the United Kingdom, it peaked at number four.

== Music video ==
The music video was directed by Bille Woodruff. Kelly is a boxer in this video, playing the part of Muhammad Ali, as this song was originally a tribute to him. There is no color in the video except for red, the hue of Kelly's boxing clothes.

== Track listings ==
Australian CD single

1. "The World's Greatest" (radio edit)
2. "The World's Greatest" (album version)
3. "The World's Greatest" (instrumental)
4. "I Decided"

European CD single

1. "The World's Greatest" (radio edit) – 3:56
2. "The World's Greatest" (album version) – 4:36

UK CD single

1. "The World's Greatest" (radio edit) – 3:56
2. "The World's Greatest" (album version) – 4:36
3. "I Decided" – 4:12

UK cassette single

1. "The World's Greatest" (album version) – 4:36
2. "I Decided" – 4:12

== Charts ==
=== Weekly charts ===
Chart (2002)	Peak position
Australia (ARIA)	104
Australian Urban (ARIA)	25
Austria (Ö3 Austria Top 40)	20
Belgium (Ultratop 50 Flanders)	9
Belgium (Ultratop 50 Wallonia)	16
Canada CHR (Nielsen BDS)	19
Denmark (Tracklisten)	12
Europe (Eurochart Hot 100)	8
France (SNEP)	13
Germany (GfK)	5
Ireland (IRMA)	6
Netherlands (Dutch Top 40)	2
Netherlands (Single Top 100)	2
New Zealand (Recorded Music NZ)	41
Norway (VG-lista)	13
Romania (Romanian Top 100)	100
Scottish Singles Sales (Official Charts)	6
Sweden (Sverigetopplistan)	7
Switzerland (Schweizer Hitparade)	11
UK Singles (Official Charts)	4
UK Indie (Official Charts)	1
UK Hip Hop/R&B (Official Charts)	1
US Billboard Hot 100	34
US Hot R&B/Hip-Hop Songs (Billboard)	31
US Pop Airplay (Billboard)	24
US Rhythmic Airplay (Billboard)	20

=== Year-end charts ===
Chart (2002)	Position
Belgium (Ultratop 50 Flanders)	51
Belgium (Ultratop 50 Wallonia)	83
Europe (Eurochart Hot 100)	30
France (SNEP)	87
Germany (Media Control)	48
Ireland (IRMA)	35
Netherlands (Dutch Top 40)	7
Netherlands (Single Top 100)	27
Sweden (Hitlistan)	22
Switzerland (Schweizer Hitparade)	60
UK Singles (OCC)	62
US Mainstream Top 40 (Billboard)	93
US Rhythmic Top 40 (Billboard)	81

== Certifications ==
Region	Certification	Certified units/sales
Germany (BVMI)	Gold	250,000^{‡}
New Zealand (RMNZ)	Gold	7,500^{*}
Sweden (GLF)	Gold	15,000^{^}
United Kingdom (BPI)	Platinum	600,000^{‡}
^{*} Sales figures based on certification alone.^{^} Shipments figures based on certification alone.^{‡} Sales+streaming figures based on certification alone.

== Release history ==
Region	Date	Format(s)	Label(s)	Ref.
United States	November 13, 2001	Rhythmic contemporary; urban radio	Interscope	
United States	November 20, 2001	Contemporary hit radio	Interscope	
Australia	February 11, 2002	CD	Jive	
United Kingdom	February 18, 2002	CD; cassette	Jive	
Japan	April 24, 2002	CD	Sony Music Japan	
