= Share My Love (song) =

Single by R. Kelly

from the album Write Me Back
- Released: February 1, 2012
- Recorded: 2011
- Genre: Neo soul
- Length: 3:43 (Album Version)
- Label: RCA
- Songwriter(s): Robert Kelly
- Producer(s): R. Kelly

R. Kelly singles chronology
"Number One Hit" (2011)	"Share My Love" (2012)	"Feelin' Single" (2012)

"Share My Love" is the lead single by American singer, songwriter and producer R. Kelly from his eleventh studio album Write Me Back. The song was written and produced by Kelly himself. It peaked at number one on the Billboard Adult R&B Songs chart, number 13 on the Billboard Hot R&B/Hip-Hop Songs chart, and number 21 on the Billboard Bubbling Under Hot 100 Singles chart. It also reached number 34 in Japan.

== Charts ==
=== Weekly charts ===
Chart (2012)	Peak position
Japan (Japan Hot 100) (Billboard)	34
US Bubbling Under Hot 100 (Billboard)	21
US Hot R&B/Hip-Hop Songs (Billboard)	13
US Radio Songs (Billboard)	74

=== Year-end charts ===
Chart (2012)	Position
US Hot R&B/Hip-Hop Songs (Billboard)	61
