= Chocolate Factory =

Studio album by R. Kelly
- Released: February 18, 2003
- Studios: Rockland (Chicago); CRC (Chicago)
- Genres: R&B; soul; neo soul
- Length: 76:26
- Label: Jive
- Producer: R. Kelly

R. Kelly chronology
The Best of Both Worlds (2002)	Chocolate Factory (2003)	The R. in R&B Collection, Vol. 1 (2003)

Singles from Chocolate Factory
- 1. "Ignition (Remix)" Released: October 22, 2002; 2. "Snake" Released: February 25, 2003; 3. "Step in the Name of Love" Released: October 15, 2003

Chocolate Factory is the fifth studio album by American recording artist R. Kelly, released on February 18, 2003, by Jive Records. Recording sessions took place mainly at Rockland Studios and Chicago Recording Company in Chicago, Illinois, and the album was primarily written, arranged, and produced by R. Kelly. Originally titled Loveland, Chocolate Factory was conceived by Kelly amid controversy over his sex scandal at the time.

The album debuted at number one on the US Billboard 200, selling over 532,000 copies in its first week of sales. It achieved success in international markets and produced three singles that attained chart success, including "Snake" and "Step in the Name of Love", and the international hit "Ignition (Remix)". Chocolate Factory was well received by critics, receiving rave reviews from publications such as The New York Times and USA Today. The album has sold over 3 million copies worldwide, and received sales certifications in the United States and United Kingdom.

== Background ==
Recording sessions for the album took place primarily at Rockland Studios and Chicago Recording Company in Chicago. Other recording locations included the Record Plant, in Los Angeles, California, Soup Can Music in Harper Woods, Michigan, and Vanguard Studios in Oak Park, Michigan. Chocolate Factory was written, arranged, and produced entirely by R. Kelly. It was released on February 18, 2003 on Jive Records, following a year of legal accusations of child pornography for which he was acquitted in 2008.

=== Loveland and leaks ===
The album was originally intended to release in 2002 by the name of "Loveland"; this album was scrapped amid bootlegging. Loveland, which had a significantly different tracklisting, was to feature the original "Step in the Name of Love", his 2001 single "The World's Greatest", and various other songs, including a ten-minute opera remix of his 1996 hit I Believe I Can Fly. Although first-run copies of Chocolate Factory included a bonus disc called Loveland, it is different from the bootleg as it is abridged and features mostly different, unleaked songs. Upon the initial leaks, The New York Times described Loveland as "one of fall's most promising albums" and noted that despite poor audio quality, "much of the music is great". Loveland, in its bootlegged form, is described as containing gospel, romantic 1970s-inspired soul, opera, and contemporary R&B.

A few songs from Loveland were included on Chocolate Factory, but the album was never released in its original form. Kelly mentions Loveland by name in the remix to "Step in the Name of Love", and promotional material for Chocolate Factory declare Loveland as "never to be released".

== Music and lyrics ==
Chocolate Factory comprises slow jams and upbeat club tracks, and many of its songs draw on classic soul music with call-and-response choruses and harmonies inspired by the Temptations, Marvin Gaye, and Stevie Wonder. Kelly's vocals veer between singing and rapping. Kelefa Sanneh of The New York Times writes that he "pack[s] his verses full of words, then improvise[s] a tricky vocal line around a simple tune."

Most of the album's lyrics focuses on romance. On "Forever", Kelly croons about an exaggerated fantasy of the married life, with "a picket fence, dog and a house / About 12 kids, you're cooking me breakfast in the morning, I'm taking the garbage out." The lively "Ignition (Remix)" is a lustful song built on automotive double-entendres.

== Critical reception ==
Professional ratings
Aggregate scores
Source	Rating
Metacritic	65/100
Review scores
Source	Rating
AllMusic	3.5/5 stars
Entertainment Weekly	B−
The Guardian	3/5 stars
Los Angeles Times	2.5/4 stars
Mojo	4/5 stars
Q	2/5 stars
Rolling Stone	3/5 stars
The Rolling Stone Album Guide	4/5 stars
USA Today	3.5/4 stars
Vibe	4/5

Chocolate Factory received generally positive reviews from music critics. At Metacritic, which assigns a normalized rating out of 100 to reviews from mainstream critics, the album received an average score of 65, based on 10 reviews, which indicates "generally favorable reviews".

Kelefa Sanneh of The New York Times found the album "elegant and strange". Mojo stated, "Chocolate Factory seems positively inspired... An impressively varied opus", and BBC Online stated "[Kelly] doesn't sound like a man with the weight of the world on his shoulders, but a revived soul in spiritual euphoria." Sterling Clover of The Village Voice noted the album's "quantity and consistency of sonic presence" and praised Kelly's performance with respect to his songs' structures, stating "Kelly has sussed how to ground himself in tight rhythmic bass and a solid backup chorus, refiguring them into layered and discontinuous sheets of sound". Rolling Stone's Anthony DeCurtis cited Chocolate Factory as "among the best work of his career" and went on to write "... as a singer, songwriter and producer, he's at the top of his game."

In a mixed review, Slant Magazine's Sal Cinquemani wrote that "Kelly's songwriting skills leave much to be desired; for every hook-driven 'You Knock Me Out' there's a 'Showdown,' an asinine, interlude-filled insult to songwriters everywhere". Q wrote that "as ever, [the album's] songs veer between the nigglingly infectious and cliched slush." Chicago Tribune writer Greg Kot viewed that "the subtext for this one makes it sound like musical spin control, a public-relations manifesto as much as an R&B album. [...] There are a few moments when the disconnect between Kelly's lyrics and his sordid legal troubles becomes disturbing, no more so than when he refers to himself as the 'pied piper of R&B' in 'Step in the Name of Love,' a reference to the fairy-tale figure who enticed a village full of children away from their parents".

Dan Leroy of Yahoo! Music's felt that "Kelly’s hot-blooded horniness is an integral part of his persona; he can hardly back away from the risque R&B that’s made him what he is, despite the underage sex scandal that dogs him". On Kelly's performance, Leroy concluded by writing:

In the end, though, it’s R’s musical genius that pulls his bare butt out of this fire. Channeling greats from Gaye to Wonder, his stripped-down bangers bang harder, his ballads have more gospel bluster, and he sings with the desperation of a loveman who knows the cops are waiting at his bedroom door.

The A.V. Club's Nathan Rabin wrote that Kelly "stitches" his "hopelessly cheesy" come-ons and "honeyed promises ... together with such craft and invests them with such conviction that they become a strange sort of pulp poetry", adding that he "matches his shamelessness with a gift for crafting melodies that burrow their way into listeners' subconscious with almost sadistic force". Keith Harris of The Rolling Stone Album Guide (2004) wrote that by the album's release, Kelly had "apparently learned from Michael Jackson's publicity mistakes, because the new Kelly was less haunted, if no less horny. The hit 'Ignition (Remix)' was his warmest pick-up joint to date, and set the tone for the new record—and maybe a new stage in his career".

More critical was veteran Village Voice reviewer Robert Christgau. While singling out "Ignition (Remix)" as the only worthy song from the album, he dismissed the recognition received by the album as critics having reevaluated Kelly's "manifestly skillful, manifestly simplistic" body of work more for its news value amid the performer's child pornography charges. For Christgau, Chocolate Factory had "bum-rushed the populace with woman-friendly rhetoric—pledges of devotion and other idealistic fancies, individualized sexual flattery, and an abject token in which Kelly not only ranks female 'backbone' above male 'bullshit' but allows as how said bullshit may be why women smoke cigarettes and snap off on their kids." He went on to dismiss "Showdown", "Snake", and "Who's That" as a "Kelly-vs.-Isley cuckolding contest", an "Orientalist sex fantasy", and "some pimp-and-thug—how'd he put it?—bullshit", respectively. While finding the remix of "Step in the Name of Love" to be "hugely engaging", Christgau pointed out how "cavalier" or "stupid" it is for Kelly to declare himself "the pied piper of r&b" given the title's "pedophilic implications".

== Accolades ==
The album was included in Rolling Stone's 50 Best Albums of 2003. Chocolate Factory was ranked in several "End of Year" lists, including Blender magazine's 2003 Albums of the Year List at number 12 and The Village Voice's Pazz & Jop Critics' Poll at number 44. Three New York Times staff writers included it on their top ten lists for 2003.

Chocolate Factory was nominated for the 2004 Grammy Award for Best Contemporary R&B Album, and "Step in the Name of Love" was nominated for Best Male R&B Vocal Performance. Rhapsody named it the second best R&B album of the first decade of the 21st century. Billboard magazine ranked Chocolate Factory at number 169 on its list of the Top 200 Albums of the Decade.

== Commercial performance ==
Chocolate Factory was first released by Jive Records on February 17, 2003, in the United Kingdom, and then on February 18 in the United States. It debuted at number one on the US Billboard 200 chart, with first-week sales of over 532,000 copies. After the release of Kelly's hit single, "Ignition (Remix)", which peaked at number two on the Billboard Hot 100, the album went on to sell over 2.72 million copies in the United States. Other hits released from Chocolate Factory included "Snake" featuring Big Tigger, peaking at number 16, and the classic soul-inspired "stepper's anthem", "Step in the Name of Love", peaking at number 9. The album's packaging design is very similar to the design of Parliament's Chocolate City album.

On May 19, 2003, the album was certified double platinum by the Recording Industry Association of America (RIAA), for shipments in excess of two million copies in the United States. Chocolate Factory has also been certified gold by the British Phonographic Industry (BPI) for shipments in excess of 100,000 copies in the United Kingdom. It has sold over three million copies worldwide.

== Track listing ==
All songs written, produced, and arranged by R. Kelly.

=== Regular edition ===
No.	Title	Length
1.	"Chocolate Factory"	3:50
2.	"Step in the Name of Love"	5:42
3.	"Heart of a Woman"	4:31
4.	"I'll Never Leave"	3:45
5.	"Been Around the World" (featuring Ja Rule)	4:05
6.	"You Made Me Love You"	4:34
7.	"Forever"	4:06
8.	"Dream Girl"	3:57
9.	"Ignition"	3:16
10.	"Ignition (Remix)"	3:06
11.	"Forever More"	3:33
12.	"You Knock Me Out"	4:10
13.	"Step in the Name of Love (Remix)"	7:12
14.	"Imagine That"	4:38
15.	"Showdown" (featuring Ronald Isley)	7:54
16.	"Snake" (featuring Big Tigger)	4:51
17.	"Who's That" (featuring Fat Joe)	3:33

==== Notes ====
- "Step in the Name of Love", "Forever", and "You Knock Me Out" were previously leaked in 2002 on bootleg copies of Loveland.

=== Loveland (Bonus Disc) ===
A limited edition of the album was also released, containing a bonus disc that has a seven-track EP titled Loveland, named after the original, scrapped version of the album. Despite this, only two songs from the bonus disc, "The World's Greatest" and "Far More", were leaked on bootleg copies of Loveland.

Loveland (limited edition bonus disc)
No.	Title	Length
1.	"Loveland"	4:27
2.	"What Do I Do"	3:35
3.	"Heaven I Need a Hug"	5:12
4.	"The World's Greatest"	4:37
5.	"Far More"	3:26
6.	"Raindrops"	3:55
7.	"Apologies of a Thug" (Europe bonus track)	4:26

== Personnel ==
Credits for Chocolate Factory adapted from AllMusic.

- Percy Bady – keyboards
- Diana Copeland – executive assistant
- Steve Bearsley – assistant
- Glen Brown – assistant
- Kara Buhl – photo production, producer
- Greg Calvert – assistant
- Joan Collaso – choir, chorus
- Joe Donatello – engineer, programming
- Rodney East – keyboards
- David Feldman – assistant
- Tony Flores – assistant
- Yvonne Gage – choir, chorus
- Andy Gallas – assistant, engineer, programming
- Abel Garibaldi – engineer, mixing, programming
- Serban Ghenea – mixing
- Hart Hollman & the Motown Romance Orchestra – orchestra
- Brandon Hull – assistant
- Dave Hyman – assistant
- Kim Johnson – vocals (background)
- R. Kelly – arranger, mixing, producer, vocals
- Gregg Landfair – guitar
- James Lee – assistant
- Henry Love – conga
- Donnie Lyle – bass, guitar, keyboards, mando
- Paul Mabin – choir, chorus
- Tony Maserati – mixing
- Ian Mereness – engineer, mixing, programming
- Jason Mlodzinski – assistant
- Peter Mokran – mixing
- Nick Monson – assistant
- Jeffrey Morrow – choir, chorus
- Jackie Murphy – art direction, design
- Kendall D. Nesbitt – keyboards
- Juan Ortiz – assistant
- Herb Powers – mastering
- Reisig – photography
- Paul Riser – conductor, horn arrangements, horn conductor, orchestration, string arrangements, string conductor
- Tim Roberts – assistant
- Carl Robinson – engineer, horn engineer, string engineer
- Stevie Robinson – choir, chorus
- Johnny Rutledge – choir, chorus
- The Soul Children – performer
- Deatta Staples – vocals (background)
- Jeff Vereb – assistant
- Pamela Watson – stylist
- Nathan Wheeler – assistant engineer
- Kyle White – assistant
- Walt Whitman & the Soul Children – performer
- Simbryt Whititngton – choir, chorus

== Charts ==
=== Weekly charts ===
Chart (2003)	Peak position
Australian Albums (ARIA)	31
Australian Urban Albums (ARIA)	8
Belgian Albums (Ultratop Flanders)	32
Canadian Albums (Nielsen SoundScan)	14
Canadian R&B Albums (Nielsen SoundScan)	8
Dutch Albums (Album Top 100)	25
French Albums (SNEP)	18
German Albums (Offizielle Top 100)	18
Irish Albums (IRMA)	54
New Zealand Albums (RMNZ)	31
Scottish Albums (Official Charts)	21
Swiss Albums (Schweizer Hitparade)	24
UK Albums (Official Charts)	10
UK R&B Albums (Official Charts)	2
US Billboard 200	1
US Top R&B/Hip-Hop Albums (Billboard)	1

=== Year-end charts ===
Chart (2003)	Position
UK Albums (OCC)	86
US Billboard 200	13
US Top R&B/Hip-Hop Albums (Billboard)	2
Worldwide Albums (IFPI)	26
Chart (2004)	Position
US Top R&B/Hip-Hop Albums (Billboard)	47

== Certifications ==
Region	Certification	Certified units/sales
United Kingdom (BPI)	Gold	100,000^{^}
United States (RIAA)	2× Platinum	2,000,000^{^}
^{^} Shipments figures based on certification alone.

== See also ==
- List of number-one albums of 2003 (U.S.)
- List of number-one R&B albums of 2003 (U.S.)

== Bibliography ==
- Brackett, Nathan; Hoard, Christian, eds. (2004). The New Rolling Stone Album Guide: Completely Revised and Updated 4th Edition. Simon and Schuster. ISBN 0-7432-0169-8.
