= Nivea discography =

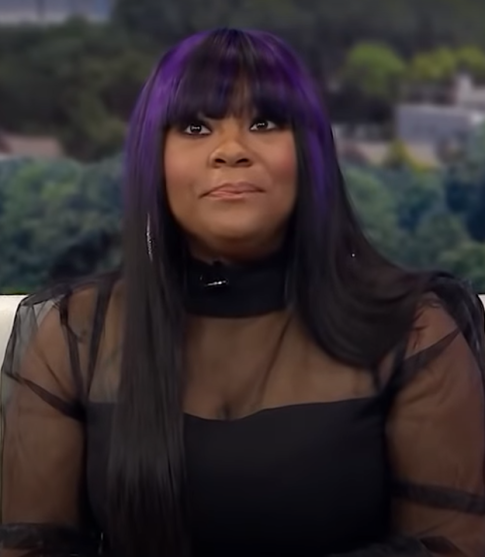
- Nivea in 2019.
- Studio albums: 4
- Extended plays: 1
- Soundtrack albums: 1
- Singles: 8
- Music videos: 11

This is the discography of American R&B singer Nivea, containing information about her albums, singles and guest appearances.

== Albums ==
=== Studio albums ===
List of studio albums, with selected chart positions
Title	Album details	Peak chart positions		
Title	Album details	US	US R&B	JPN
Nivea	Released: September 25, 2001; Label: Jive; Formats: CD, digital download	80	25	37
Complicated	Released: May 3, 2005; Label: Jive; Formats: CD, digital download	37	9	18
Animalistic	Released: November 15, 2006; Label: Formula; Formats: CD, digital download	—	—	70
Mirrors	Released: September 26, 2019; Label: Hill Music Group; Formats: CD, digital download	—	—	—

== EPs ==
List of extended plays, with selected details
Title	Extended play details
Nivea: Undercover	Released: September 12, 2011; Label: Self-released; Formats: CD, digital download

== Singles ==
=== As lead artist ===
List of singles, with selected chart positions
Title	Year	Peak chart positions					Certifications	Album
Title	Year	US	US R&B	AUS	NZ	UK	Certifications	Album
"Danger (Been So Long)" (with Mystikal)	2000	14	1	—	—	28		Let's Get Ready
"Don't Mess with the Radio"	2001	90	85	14	—	48 (Note: In the UK, "Run Away (I Wanna Be with U)" and "Don't Mess with the Radio" were released as a double A-side single.)	ARIA: Gold	Nivea
"Run Away (I Wanna Be with U)" (featuring Pusha T of Clipse)	2002	—	—	47	—	48		Nivea
"Don't Mess with My Man" (featuring Jagged Edge)	2002	8	25	28	10	41 (Note: In the UK, "Don't Mess with My Man" originally charted at #41 but was re-released as a double A-side with "Laundromat" and peaked at number 33 on the UK Singles Chart.)	RMNZ: Platinum	Nivea
"Laundromat"	2003	58	20	—	—	33		Nivea
"Okay" (featuring Lil Jon and YoungBloodZ)	2004	40	14	—	28	—		Complicated
"Parking Lot"	2005	—	— (Note: "Parking Lot" did not enter the Hot R&B/Hip-Hop Songs, but peaked at number three on the Bubbling Under R&B/Hip-Hop Singles chart.)	—	—	—		Complicated
"Watch It"	2006	—	—	—	—	—		Animalistic
"Circles"	2018	—	—	—	—	—		Mirrors
"Virginia"	2022	—	—	—	—	—		Non-album singles
"Killa"	2023	—	—	—	—	—		Non-album singles
"—" denotes releases that did not chart

=== Promotional singles ===
List of promotional singles, with selected chart positions
Title	Year	Peak chart positions	Album
Title	Year	US R&B	Album
"25 Reasons"	2003	— (Note: "25 Reasons" did not enter the Hot R&B/Hip-Hop Songs, but peaked at number four on the Bubbling Under R&B/Hip-Hop Singles chart.)	Nivea
"You Like It Like That" (featuring Rasheeda)	2004	86	Non-album single
"Complicated"	2005	—	Complicated
"Love Hurts"	2010	—	Non-album single
"Stronger Than Pride"	2010	—	Nivea Undercover
"Bump" (with George Reefah)	2011	—	Non-album singles
"Loud Blunt"	2013	—	Non-album singles

== Album appearances ==
List of album appearances by Nivea
Title	Year	Other artist(s)	Album
"The Field"	1999	Cool Breeze	East Point's Greatest Hit
"Danger (Been So Long)"	2000	Mystikal	Let's Get Ready
"What You Waitin' For"	2002	—N/a	Drumline soundtrack
"Main Girl"	2003	Nick Cannon	Nick Cannon
"Touchin'"	2005	R. Kelly	TP.3 Reloaded
"Oh, I Think They Like Me (Remix)"	2005	Dem Franchize Boyz	—N/a
"Ask for It"	2006	T-Pain	—N/a
"She Feelin' Me"	2006	Lil' Wayne	—N/a
"It Only Hurts Forever"	2010	Sir Will	Road 2 Rose – The Detour
"Surprise"	2010	Rasheeda	Boss Bitch Music
"Say Something" (Remix)	2010	Rasheeda	Boss Bitch Music
"Bump"	2011	George Reefah	—N/a
"This Way"	2018	Snypa	Learning 2 Love
"Dope New Gospel"	2018	Lil Wayne	Tha Carter V
