= Tarantula (Mystikal album) =

Studio album by Mystikal
- Released: December 18, 2001 (US)
- Recorded: 2000–2001
- Genre: Hip-hop
- Length: 57:52
- Label: Jive Records
- Producer: Mystikal (ex.); Tevester Scott (ex.); The Neptunes; Scott Storch; Vinnie Biggs; Ward "Wardy" Corbett; Juvenile; KLC; Rockwilder; Odell; DJ Twinz; DJ Ron

Mystikal chronology
Let's Get Ready (2000)	Tarantula (2001)

Singles from Tarantula
- 1. "Bouncin' Back (Bumpin' Me Against the Wall)" Released: December 4, 2001; 2. "Tarantula" Released: February 19, 2002

Tarantula is the fifth and final studio album by American rapper Mystikal, released on December 18, 2001, by Jive Records. The production was done by Rockwilder, Scott Storch, The Medicine Men, and The Neptunes and features artists including Juvenile, Butch Cassidy, and Method Man & Redman.

The album received a generally positive reception from critics who found it an improvement over his previous album, Let's Get Ready. It spawned two singles: "Bouncin' Back (Bumpin' Me Against the Wall)" and the title track. Tarantula debuted at number 33 on the Billboard 200 with first-week sales of 153,000 copies, peaking at number 25 in 2002 and reaching number 4 on the R&B/Hip-Hop Albums chart that same year. It was later certified gold by the RIAA for selling over 500,000 copies. In 2003, Tarantula received two nominations at the 45th Annual Grammy Awards for Best Rap Album and Best Male Rap Solo Performance for "Bouncin' Back (Bumpin' Me Against the Wall)".

== Critical reception ==
Professional ratings
Aggregate scores
Source	Rating
Metacritic	68/100
Review scores
Source	Rating
AllMusic	4/5 stars
Entertainment Weekly	B−
HipHopDX	4/5 stars
NME	7/10 stars
RapReviews	8/10
Vibe	3/5 stars

Tarantula received a generally positive reception from music critics who saw it as an improvement over Let's Get Ready in terms of production and subject matter. At Metacritic, which assigns a normalized rating out of 100 to reviews from mainstream critics, the album received an average score of 68, based on 7 reviews.

AllMusic's Jason Birchmeier praised the album for its production complimenting Mystikal's frenetic delivery, saying that "he has recorded his second great album in a row". Despite finding filler in the album, HipHopDX writer Wise Q praised it for continuing the previous album's formula of great production and wordplay, concluding that, "On the whole, the wild haired lyricist has made a good attempt at a follow-up and although it may not be five star status, it is definitely one for the collection." Kitty Empire of NME commented on how Mystikal is able to deviate from the typical hip-hop clichés and deliver tracks that express different topics, singling out the post-9/11 track "Bouncin' Back (Bumpin' Me Against the Wall)" for providing real substance and found it "strangely compelling for a show of strength". Nathan Rabin of The A.V. Club found the album more focused and consistent than Let's Get Ready because of Mystikal's production team showing improvement, saying that "Tarantula suggests that the raspy-voiced rapper's run at the top of the charts won't abate any time soon." Vibe writer Shawn Edwards was critical of Mystikal's delivery, complimenting it for being distinctive but lacking in lyrical creativity, saying that he "has the potential to be the ringmaster, but right now he seems content just clowning around".

In 2003, the album received two nominations at the 45th Annual Grammy Awards for Best Rap Album and Best Male Rap Solo Performance for "Bouncin' Back (Bumpin' Me Against the Wall)" but lost both awards to Eminem's The Eminem Show and Nelly's "Hot in Herre", respectively. In 2011, Complex ranked the album number 43 on its list of "The 50 Worst Rap Album Fails". Complex editor Chris Yuscavage called it a let-down compared to his previous album, saying, "With all eyes on the rapid-fire spitter, Mystikal seriously dropped the ball with Tarantula, his phoned-in follow-up that dropped only one year later. Even with reliable collaborators like The Neptunes, Scott Storch, and KLC, every song on the LP felt like a half-baked imitation of his previous work."

== Track listing ==
No.	Title	Writer(s)	Producer(s)	Length
1.	"Bouncin' Back (Bumpin' Me Against the Wall)"	Michael Tyler; Pharrell Williams; Chad Hugo	The Neptunes	4:19
2.	"Tarantula" (featuring Butch Cassidy)	Tyler; Scott Storch; Danny Means	Scott Storch	4:10
3.	"If It Ain't Live, It Ain't Me"	Tyler; Vinnie Biggs; Ward Corbett	Vinnie Biggs; Ward "Wardy" Corbett	3:48
4.	"Settle the Score" (featuring Juvenile)	Tyler; Terius Gray	Juvenile	4:42
5.	"Pussy Crook"	Tyler; Dominic Thomas; Craig Lawson	KLC	4:32
6.	"Ooooh Yeah"	Tyler; Dana Stinson	Rockwilder	4:04
7.	"Big Truck Driver"	Tyler; Lawson	KLC	5:14
8.	"Smoke One"	Tyler; Odell Vickers	Odell	4:23
9.	"Alright"	Tyler; Storch	Scott Storch	3:54
10.	"I Get It Started" (featuring Redman & Method Man)	Tyler; Reggie Noble; Raymond Grant; Richard Grant; Clifford Smith; Stinson	Rockwilder; DJ Twinz	3:28
11.	"Paper Stack" (featuring Shonnie, Beezy Boy & Dart)	Tyler; Lawson; Shantal Walker; Brian Thomas; Dartanian Stovall	KLC	3:57
12.	"Go 'Head"	Tyler; Williams; Hugo	The Neptunes	4:08
13.	"The Return"	Tyler; Ron Ward; Lawson; Hugo; Williams	DJ Ron; KLC	3:47
14.	"That's That Shit"	Tyler; Lawson	KLC	3:26

Sample credits

- "The Return" contains a sample from "Shake Ya Ass", written by Michael Tyler, Charles Hugo, and Pharrell Williams, as performed by Mystikal.

== Personnel ==
- Big V-90 – additional background vocals (6)
- Butch Cassidy – additional vocals (2)
- Byou2ful – additional vocals (7)
- Tom Chianti – engineer (6)
- Andrew Coleman – engineer (1, 12)
- Tom Coyne – mastering
- Mitch DiStefano – bass guitar (13)
- Supa Engineer Duro – mixing (1, 2, 12)
- Brian Garten – additional Pro Tools editing (1, 12)
- $tevie Green – additional background vocals (6)
- Troy Hightower – mixing (3)
- Chad Hugo – horns (1)
- Gimel Keaton – engineer (9)
- Devon Kirkpatrick – engineer (9, 10)
- KLC – engineer (4, 5, 7, 8, 11, 14), additional vocals (5, 7)
- Michael Koch – engineer (6)
- Evelyn Mojica – additional background vocals (6)
- Mystikal – executive producer
- DJ Ron – additional background vocals (6)
- Tevester Scott – executive producer
- DJ Scratch – cuts (13)
- Dexter Simmons – mixing (6, 10)
- Brian Stanley – engineer (2, 3, 13), mixing (13)
- Rich Tapper – lead guitar (13)
- Lara Vaidya – additional background vocals (9)
- "The Natural" Pat Viala – engineer (2, 4, 6, 7, 9, 10), mixing (4, 5, 7, 8, 11, 14)
- Odell Vickers – engineer (8)
- Pharrell Williams – additional vocals (1, 12), horns (1)
- Wassim Zreik – mixing (9)

== Charts and certifications ==
=== Weekly charts ===
Chart (2002)	Peak position
US Billboard 200	25
US Top R&B/Hip-Hop Albums (Billboard)	4

=== Year-end charts ===
Year-end chart performance for Tarantula by Mystikal
Chart (2002)	Position
Canadian R&B Albums (Nielsen SoundScan)	138
Canadian Rap Albums (Nielsen SoundScan)	70
US Billboard 200	104
US Top R&B/Hip-Hop Albums	19

=== Certifications ===
Region	Certification	Certified units/sales
United States (RIAA)	Gold	500,000^{^}
^{^} Shipments figures based on certification alone.
