= Mind of Mystikal =

Studio album by Mystikal
- Released: October 10, 1995
- Recorded: 1993–1995
- Studio: Sound Services Studio; Precise Recordings Studio
- Genre: Southern hip-hop; hardcore hip-hop
- Length: 1:05:20
- Label: Big Boy; Jive
- Producer: Leroy "Precise" Edwards

Mystikal chronology
Mystikal (1994)	Mind of Mystikal (1995)	Unpredictable (1997)

Professional ratings
Review scores
Source	Rating
AllMusic	3/5 stars
Robert Christgau	(1-star Honorable Mention)

Mind of Mystikal is a re-release of the debut studio album by American New Orleans–based rapper Mystikal. It was released on October 10, 1995, through Big Boy/Jive Records. Recording sessions took place at Sound Services Studio and at Precise Recordings Studio. Produced by Leroy "Precise" Edwards, it features guest appearances from the Boot Camp Clicc and Black Menace.

The album peaked at number 103 on the Billboard 200 and number 14 on the Top R&B/Hip-Hop Albums charts in the United States. It was certified gold by the Recording Industry Association of America on December 4, 1998 for selling 500,000 copies in the US alone.

== Track listing ==
All tracks are written by Michael Tyler, except track 4 is written with Ronald Jones.

No.	Title	Length
1.	"Ya'll Ain't Ready Yet"	5:54
2.	"Murderer" (featuring Insane)	5:30
3.	"Beware" (featuring Precise)	3:35
4.	"Mr. Hood Critic" (featuring J-Dawg and G-Quikk)	4:08
5.	"I'm" (featuring Precise)	4:24
6.	"Out That Boot Camp Clicc." (featuring Black Menace)	4:20
7.	"Not That Nigga" (featuring Michelle Tyler)	6:00
8.	"Smoke Something" (featuring G-Quikk)	2:06
9.	"That Nigga Ain't Shit!"	3:04
10.	"Mind of Mystikal" (featuring the Boot Camp Clicc)	3:43
11.	"Here I Go"	5:44
12.	"Never Gonna Bounce (The Dream)"	3:50
13.	"Ya'll Ain't Ready Yet (Remix)" (featuring Precise and G-Slimm)	5:57
14.	"Not That Nigga (Remix)" (featuring Michelle Tyler)	5:58
15.	"Dedicated to Michelle Tyler"	1:07
Total length:		1:05:20

== Charts ==
=== Weekly charts ===
Chart (1995)	Peak position
US Billboard 200	103
US Top R&B/Hip-Hop Albums (Billboard)	14

=== Year-end charts ===
Chart (1995)	Position
US Top R&B/Hip-Hop Albums (Billboard)	87
Chart (1996)	Position
US Top R&B/Hip-Hop Albums (Billboard)	58

== Certifications ==
Certifications for Mind of Mystikal
Region	Certification	Certified units/sales
United States (RIAA)	Gold	500,000^{^}
^{^} Shipments figures based on certification alone.
