= Bouncin' Back (Bumpin' Me Against the Wall) =

Single by Mystikal

from the album Tarantula
- B-side: "Pussy Crook"
- Released: December 4, 2001
- Recorded: 2001
- Genre: Hip-hop
- Length: 4:21
- Label: Jive
- Songwriters: Michael Tyler; Pharrell Williams; Charles Hugo
- Producer: The Neptunes

Mystikal singles chronology
"Stutter" (2001)	"Bouncin' Back (Bumpin' Me Against the Wall)" (2001)	"Don't Stop (Funkin' 4 Jamaica)" (2001)

"Bouncin' Back (Bumpin' Me Against the Wall)" is the lead single released from Mystikal's fifth album, Tarantula.

The song was Mystikal's third consecutive Top 40 single produced by the Neptunes. While it was not as successful as his previous two singles ("Shake Ya Ass" and "Danger (Been So Long)"), "Bouncin' Back" nevertheless proved to be the album's most successful single, peaking at 37 on the Billboard Hot 100, while entering the Top 10 on both the Hot R&B/Hip-Hop Singles & Tracks (number 8) and Hot Rap Singles (number 7). At the 45th Grammy Awards, it was nominated for Best Male Rap Solo Performance, but it lost to Nelly's "Hot in Herre", which was also produced by the Neptunes.

== Single track listing ==
=== A-Side ===
1. "Bouncin' Back (Bumpin' Me Against the Wall)" (Extended Version)- 4:15
2. "Bouncin' Back (Bumpin' Me Against the Wall)" (Instrumental)- 4:15

=== B-Side ===
1. "Pussy Crook"- 4:32
2. "Pussy Crook" (Instrumental)- 4:32

== Charts ==
=== Peak positions ===
Chart (2002)	Peak position
Billboard Hot 100	37
Billboard Hot R&B/Hip-Hop Singles & Tracks	8
Billboard Hot Rap Singles	7
Billboard Rhythmic Top 40	19

=== Year-end charts ===
End of year chart (2002)	Position
Billboard Hot R&B/Hip-Hop Singles & Tracks	52
