= Let's Get Ready =

Studio album by Mystikal
- Released: September 26, 2000
- Recorded: 1999–2000
- Genre: Hip-hop
- Length: 76:52
- Label: Jive
- Producers: The Neptunes; Earthtone III; P.A.; The Medicine Men; Bink!; Leroy "Precise" Edwards; David "D-Funk" Faulk

Mystikal chronology
Ghetto Fabulous (1998)	Let's Get Ready (2000)	Tarantula (2001)

Singles from Let's Get Ready
- 1. "Shake Ya Ass" Released: July 18, 2000; 2. "Danger (Been So Long)" Released: December 12, 2000

Professional ratings
Review scores
Source	Rating
AllMusic	4/5 stars
Entertainment Weekly	A−
NME	
RapReviews	8/10
Rolling Stone	3/5 stars

Let's Get Ready is the fourth studio album by American rapper Mystikal, released on September 26, 2000, by Jive Records. It serves as Mystikal's first album since parting ways with No Limit Records. The album features appearances from Outkast, Da Brat, Nivea, and Petey Pablo. Pharrell Williams appears uncredited on "Shake Ya Ass".

The album debuted at number 1 on the Billboard 200, selling 330,663 copies in its first week. It has sold approximately 2,227,536 copies and was certified double platinum in the U.S. The album featured Mystikal's two biggest singles, "Shake Ya Ass", which peaked at number 13 on the Billboard Hot 100, and "Danger (Been So Long)", which peaked at number 14.

== Track listing ==
Let's Get Ready track listing
No.	Title	Writer(s)	Producer(s)	Length
1.	"Ready to Rumble"	Michael Tyler; Craig Lawson; Odell Vickers; Raymond Poole; Craig Bazile	The Medicine Men	4:51
2.	"Shake Ya Ass"	Tyler; Chad Hugo; Pharrell Williams	The Neptunes	4:16
3.	"Jump"	Tyler; Williams; Hugo	The Neptunes	4:06
4.	"Danger (Been So Long)" (featuring Nivea)	Tyler; Hugo; Williams	The Neptunes	3:31
5.	"Come See About Me" (featuring Da Brat and Petey Pablo)	Tyler; Kawan Prather; Maurice Sinclair; James Hollins; Shawntae Harris; Moses Barrett III	PA; Ralph Cacciurri; Blake Eiseman	4:41
6.	"Big Truck Boys"	Tyler; Lawson	KLC	5:15
7.	"I Rock, I Roll"	Tyler; Poole	MO B Dick	4:31
8.	"U Would If U Could"	Tyler; Vickers	Odell	5:09
9.	"Mystikal Fever"	Tyler	Bink!	3:52
10.	"Family" (featuring Latrelle)	Tyler; Hugo; Williams	The Neptunes	4:51
11.	"Ain't Gonna See Tomorrow"	Tyler; André Benjamin; Antwan Patton; David Sheats	Earthtone III	4:28
12.	"The Braids"	Tyler; Benjamin; Patton; Sheats	Earthtone III	4:06
13.	"Smoked Out"	Tyler	David "D-Funk" Faulk; Leroy "Precise" Edwards	3:57
14.	"Murderer III"	Tyler; Lawson	KLC	4:20
15.	"Neck uv da Woods" (featuring Outkast)	Tyler; Benjamin; Patton	Earthtone III	4:05
16.	"I'm Throwed Off" (hidden track)		KLC	4:33
17.	"Lookin' for Me" (hidden track)		KLC; Craig B.	4:53
18.	"Petey Pablo Snippets" (hidden track)			2:17

== Personnel ==
- Vincent Alexander – assistant engineer and mixing assistant (11)
- Won Allen – engineer (3)
- Warren Bletcher – assistant engineer (11)
- Ralph Cacciurri – engineer (11, 12, 15)
- Andrew Coleman – engineer (2, 10)
- Myrna "Peach" Crenshaw – background vocals (11)
- Preston Crump – guitar (5), bass guitar (11, 12, 15)
- Supa Engineer Duro – mixing (2–4, 10)
- Earthtone III – keyboards (12)
- Leroy "Precise" Edwards – engineer and mixing (13)
- David "D-Funk" Faulk – engineer and mixing (13)
- Chad Hugo – instruments (2, 4)
- Steve Fisher – assistant engineer (11)
- John Frye – engineer and mixing (11, 12)
- Brian "Big Bass" Gardner – mastering
- Joi Gilliam – background vocals (11)
- Rajinder "Conga Man" Kala – congas (15)
- KLC – engineer and mixing (1, 6–8, 13, 14)
- Daniel Fresco – mixing assistant (15)
- Latrelle – background vocals (10)
- Craig Love – guitar (5)
- Donny Mathis – guitar (12)
- Odell – remixing (13)
- Kevin Parker – engineer (11, 12)
- Marvin "Chanz" Parkman – keyboards (11, 12), synthesizer (15)
- Neal H Pogue – mixing (15)
- Jason Rome – assistant engineer (15)
- Amos Singleton – bass and lead guitar (6)
- Alvin Speights – mixing (5)
- Pat Viala – engineer (2, 4, 5, 9, 10), mixing (9)
- Pharrell Williams – instruments (2, 4)

== Charts ==
=== Weekly charts ===
Chart (2000)	Peak position
US Billboard 200	1
US Top R&B/Hip-Hop Albums (Billboard)	1

=== Year-end charts ===
Chart (2000)	Position
US Billboard 200	75
US Top R&B/Hip-Hop Albums (Billboard)	22

Chart (2001)	Position
Canadian R&B Albums (Nielsen SoundScan)	72
US Billboard 200	84
US Top R&B/Hip-Hop Albums (Billboard)	27

== Certifications ==
Certifications for Let's Get Ready
Region	Certification	Certified units/sales
Canada (Music Canada)	Gold	50,000^{^}
United States (RIAA)	2× Platinum	2,000,000^{^}
^{^} Shipments figures based on certification alone.

== See also ==
- List of Billboard 200 number-one albums of 2000
