= Trade It All =

Trade It All may refer to:

- "Trade It All" (song), 2001 song by Fabolous featuring Jagged Edge
- Trade It All, 2006 album by Orlando Brown
- "Trade It All", 2015 single by Demetria McKinney
