= Don't Mess with My Man =

Don't Mess with My Man may refer to:

- "Don't Mess with My Man" (Lucy Pearl song), a 2000 song from the album Lucy Pearl
- "Don't Mess with My Man" (Nivea song), a 2002 song from the album Nivea
