= Shake It Fast =

Shake It Fast may refer to:

- "Shake It Fast", the clean version of the 2000 single "Shake Ya Ass" by Mystikal
- "Shake It Fast", a 2016 song by Rae Sremmurd
