= Laundromat (song) =

2003 single by Nivea

Single by Nivea

from the album Nivea
- Released: January 21, 2003
- Studio: Rock Land (Chicago)
- Genre: R&B; pop
- Length: 4:25
- Label: Jive
- Songwriter: R. Kelly
- Producer: R. Kelly

Nivea singles chronology
"Don't Mess With My Man" (2002)	"Laundromat" (2003)	"25 Reasons" / "Ya Ya Ya" (2003)

"Laundromat" is a song by American singer Nivea from her 2002 self-titled debut album. Jive released it in the UK as a double A-side single along with "Don't Mess With My Man" on April 28, 2003. R. Kelly wrote and produced "Laundromat", and performed some uncredited vocals on the recording, which is an R&B and pop track. It was recorded and mixed in Chicago, and was one of the last songs to be produced for the album. The track is structured as a telephone call in which Nivea breaks up with her boyfriend, who is played by Kelly. The lyrics use the laundromat as a metaphor for the washing away of an old relationship.

Critics praised Kelly for his contributions to the song. In the US, "Laundromat" peaked at number 58 on the Billboard Hot 100 chart and was ranked at number 92 on the Billboard Year-End chart for the Hot R&B/Hip-Hop Singles & Tracks ranking. The single received heavy airplay and appeared on the Hot R&B/Hip-Hop Singles & Tracks Billboard chart; journalists cited this success as evidence that Kelly's 2002 arrest for possessing child pornography did not hurt his career. "Laundromat" further reached number 33 on the UK Singles Chart, number 89 on the Scottish Singles Chart, and number 98 on the European Hot 100 Singles chart.

"Laundromat" was supported through live performances and a music video, although Nivea did not perform it with Kelly. The song's accompanying music video was filmed in a laundromat and includes Nick Cannon in Kelly's role. In 2013, Solange Knowles covered "Laundromat" in a laundromat; her performance was praised by critics, who enjoyed the song choice and the venue.

== Background and recording ==
After Nivea's debut solo single "Don't Mess With the Radio" underperformed in 2001, her record label Jive pushed back the US release of her self-titled debut album to the following year. During this time, she worked with R. Kelly on the songs "Ya Ya Ya", "The One for Me", and "Laundromat" for Nivea; these were the last tracks to be added to the album prior to its release. Although Nivea was delayed in the US, Jive released the album internationally with a different track list, which did not include Kelly's songs.

Kelly wrote, arranged, and produced "Laundromat", and performed uncredited vocals on the track. In a 2003 Sister 2 Sister interview, Nivea said she did not know Kelly had not been credited and denied claims this was done to hide his involvement with the song. "Laundromat" was recorded and mixed at Rock Land recording studio, Chicago. Kelly mixed the song with Ian Mereness, who programmed it with Abel Garibaldi. Jason Mlodzinski assisted with mixing and programming. Andy Gallas recorded the track with Mereness and Garibaldi. Tom Coyne mastered all of the songs for Nivea, including "Laundromat".

== Music and lyrics ==
"Laundromat"
Billboard's Chuck Taylor believed "Laundromat" fell between "straight-up R&B and modern pop", while AllMusic's Alex Henderson identified "some '70s sweet soul influence" in the song.

"Laundromat" is a four-minute, 25-second R&B and pop song performed in the style of a slow jam. Billboard's Chuck Taylor reviewed the single as a pop track, describing it as straddling "the line between straight-up R&B and modern pop". Taylor wrote that, after the opening, "Laundromat" moves into "dreamy vocal layers" and a "slow-grooving, sing-songy chorus". AllMusic's Alex Henderson said "Laundromat" has "some '70s sweet soul influence" but noted that Nivea did not follow the same neo soul trend as Mary J. Blige, Jaguar Wright, Alicia Keys, and Jill Scott.

Writing for Vibe, Laura Checkoway referred to "Laundromat" as "an R&B jam-meets-detergent jingle". In her review of the album, Checkoway characterized Nivea's vocals as a "sugary soprano". The song uses the sounds of bursting bubbles and dripping water as a part of its instrumental; Rolling Stone writers Hank Shteamer, Elias Leight, and Brittany Spanos identified a contrast between the single's sound and its lyrics, writing: "The bubbly funk arrangement can't conceal the song's tragic core."

"Laundromat" is about the break-up of a relationship that occurs during a telephone call. The song's lyrics use the laundromat as a metaphor for the washing away of an old relationship, as exemplified in the chorus: "Soap, powder, bleach, towels / Fabric softener, dollars, change / Pants, socks, dirty drawers / I'm headed to the laundromat." The song opens with Nivea arguing with Kelly, who is referred to as Keith; she calls him "a lying, cheating, son of a ..." and later hangs up on him. The New York Times's Neil Strauss described the track as having "a half-spoken and half-sung arrangement", and likened the chorus to a Burt Bacharach song.

== Release and promotion ==
Jive released "Laundromat" in the UK as a double A-side single with "Don't Mess With My Man" on the week of April 28, 2003. "Don't Mess With My Man" was previously distributed as a single on June 3, 2002. In the US, "Laundromat" was promoted as a single in 2003, first distributed to rhythmic contemporary and urban contemporary radio stations for the week beginning January 21, 2003; according to Billboard's Carla Hay, this occurred even while "Don't Mess With My Man" was "still in heavy rotation at many radio stations". "Laundromat" was made available as a 12-inch single, cassette, and a CD single. Nivea did not perform the single live with Kelly, and his part was done by a singer named Katrelle. The song appeared on the 2003 compilation album Totally R&B; AllMusic's Andy Kellman praised "Laundromat" as one of its highlights.

Nzingha Stewart filmed the music video for "Laundromat" in a laundromat. Nick Cannon, who had previously collaborated with Kelly, was his stand-in for the video. Discussing Kelly's absence, author Mark Anthony Neal wrote: "A man accused of inappropriate sexual behavior with minors obviously cannot show up in a music video cooing in the ear of a teenager."

== Critical reception ==
Tracey Cooper of the Waikato Times praised "Laundromat", along with "Don't Mess With My Man" and "What You Waitin' For", for having a "cruisy groove and attitude" that would appeal to "the soul sistas". The Herald Sun's Karen Tye described the song as a "blend of silken phrasings and smooth R&B beats". In a People article, Chuck Arnold highlighted its humor, and Steve Jones, writing for the Gannett News Service, considered it one of the "clever tracks" in which Nivea "shows her moxie". In 2007, Vibe's Sean Fennessey wrote that Nivea "never sounded fresher or sharper" than on "Laundromat".

Although he enjoyed the chorus and verses separately, Neil Strauss said they were incompatible in a single song, and criticized the lyrics as seeming "quickly written and unconvincingly delivered". The Courier-Mail's Emma Chalmers enjoyed the chorus, but wrote that its "musical-style singing conversation doesn't come off overall". A reviewer for Music Week disliked the laundry metaphor and said the song was overshadowed by "Don't Mess With My Man" on the double A-side release. In her negative review of Nivea, the Edmonton Journal's Sandra Sperounes was critical of "Laundromat", writing: "You'll find more soul in a bottle of bath gel."

Kelly was praised by reviewers, several of whom cited his songs as highlights of Nivea. Chistie Leo of the New Straits Times said that "Laundromat", as well as "Ya Ya Ya", had "catapulted [Nivea] to a promising start". Some retrospective articles remained positive toward Kelly. Fennessey included "Laundromat" in his 2007 list of Kelly's essential collaborations; in his entry for the song, he noted Nivea was "another in a long line of young females [he] has err, raised up ... with his vocal talent". In a 2013 Fuse article, Nicole James commended Kelly's performance of the chorus, although they were uncertain about using a laundromat as a metaphor. Other critics had more negative responses. While panning the choice of collaborators, Laura Checkoway wrote "the banter between barely legal Nivea and Kelly is unsettling". Sperounes viewed Kelly's songs as the worst on Nivea and was critical of the album as a whole.

== Commercial performance ==
For the week of March 8, 2003, "Laundromat" peaked at number 58 on the Billboard Hot 100 chart and number 20 on the Hot R&B/Hip-Hop Singles & Tracks Billboard chart. On the Billboard Year-End chart, it reached number 92 for the Hot R&B/Hip-Hop Singles & Tracks category. Music journalists pointed to the single's success when discussing how Kelly's 2002 arrest for possessing child pornography did not damage his career. In a USA Today article, Steve Jones reported that the song still received "heavy airplay". The Atlanta Journal-Constitution's Sonia Murray said that 14 months after Kelly was alleged to have made child pornography, ten of his songs, including "Laundromat", were on the Hot R&B/Hip-Hop Singles & Tracks Billboard chart. In a 2018 Vibe article, Khaaliq Crowder said Nivea found "modest success" with "Laundromat" and "Don't Mess With the Radio" but identified "Don't Mess With My Man" as her most successful single.

"Laundromat" peaked at number 33 on the UK Singles Chart. It was Nivea's second top-40 entry following her 2000 collaboration with Mystikal, "Danger (Been So Long)". "Laundromat" reached number two on the UK Independent Singles Chart and number eight on the UK R&B Singles Chart. In Scotland, "Laundromat" peaked at number 89 on its singles chart. It reached number 98 on the European Hot 100 Singles chart. For these European charts, "Laundromat" charted with "Don't Mess With My Man" as part of its double A-side release.

== Solange Knowles cover ==
On July 29, 2013, Solange Knowles performed a part of "Laundromat" at a laundromat in Boerum Hill as part of a series of live concerts called "Uncapped" that was sponsored by Vitaminwater and The Fader. Vitaminwater's brand manager Ben Garnero said the laundromat concert was intended to "take on these iconic, mundane moments and tackle Mondays in New York and these places you never expect to see a show". The event was a part of the company's "Make Boring Brilliant" campaign and was attended by approximately 150 people.

Knowles sang both Nivea's and Kelly's parts while dancing on top of washing machines. During the performance, she said: "This laundromat has me feeling the drama queen, so excuse my theatrics." For the concert, Knowles was accompanied by a six-person band. She had rehearsed the cover five minutes before the show began. Knowles performed the first 90 seconds of "Laundromat" before moving into Dirty Projectors' 2009 song "Stillness Is the Move". When asked about her song choice, Knowles described "Laundromat" as one of her most-played songs and one she always wanted to cover.

Critics praised Knowles's performance; The Fader's Deidre Dyer and Nicole James said she picked the perfect venue for the song. James said they have enjoyed the decision to set the event in a laundromat more than the actual performance itself. Fuse's Joe Lynch commended the arrangement, saying the band had modified the song for "Solange's casually funky vibe perfectly".

== Track listings ==
12-inch single
No.	Title	Length
1.	"Laundromat" (radio edit)	4:23
2.	"Laundromat" (instrumental)	4:23
3.	"Don't Mess With My Man" (remix)	3:52

12-inch single
No.	Title	Length
1.	"Laundromat" (radio edit)	4:23
2.	"Laundromat" (instrumental)	4:23
3.	"Don't Mess With My Man" (remix)	3:52
4.	"Don't Mess With My Man" (version 1 main clean instrumental)	3:36

CD single
No.	Title	Length
1.	"Laundromat" (radio edit)	4:25
2.	"Laundromat" (instrumental)	4:22

CD single
No.	Title	Length
1.	"Laundromat" (radio edit)	4:25
2.	"Don't Mess With My Man"	3:33

CD single
No.	Title	Length
1.	"Laundromat" (radio edit)	4:25
2.	"Don't Mess With My Man" (remix)	3:52
3.	"Laundromat" (instrumental)	4:22
4.	"Laundromat" (music video)	4:27

== Credits and personnel ==
Credits are adapted from the liner notes of Nivea:

Recording locations

- Recorded and mixed in Rock Land Studios in Chicago

Personnel

- R. Kelly – arrangement, composition, mixing, production
- Ian Mereness – mixing, programming, recording
- Jason Mlodzinski – mixing assistance, programming assistance
- Abel Garibaldi – programming, recording
- Andy Gallas – recording
- Tom Coyne – mastering

== Charts ==
=== Weekly charts ===
Weekly chart performance for "Laundromat"
Chart (2003)	Peak position
Europe (Eurochart Hot 100)	98
Scotland (OCC)	89
UK Indie (OCC)	2
UK R&B (OCC)	8
UK Singles (OCC)	33
US Billboard Hot 100	58
US Hot R&B/Hip-Hop Singles & Tracks (Billboard)	20

=== Year-end charts ===
Year-end chart performance for "Laundromat"
Chart (2003)	Position
US Hot R&B/Hip-Hop Singles & Tracks (Billboard)	92
