= Okay (Nivea song) =

2004 single by Nivea featuring Lil Jon and YoungBloodZ

Single by Nivea featuring Lil Jon and YoungBloodZ

from the album Complicated
- Released: October 19, 2004
- Genre: Crunk&B
- Length: 4:43
- Label: Jive
- Songwriters: Nivea Hamilton; Jonathan Smith; Sean Paul Joseph; Jeffrey Grigsby; Traci Hale; Terius Nash
- Producer: Lil Jon

Nivea singles chronology
"Laundromat" (2003)	"Okay" (2004)	"Parking Lot" (2005)

Lil Jon singles chronology
"Let's Go" (2004)	"Okay" (2004)	"That's Nasty" (2004)

YoungBloodZ singles chronology
"Chevrolet's" (2004)	"Okay" (2004)	"Datz Me" (2005)

Music video
- "Okay" on YouTube

"Okay" is a song by American singer Nivea, released on October 19, 2004, as the lead single from her second studio album Complicated (2005). It features American rapper Lil Jon and American hip-hop duo YoungBloodZ.

== Background ==
"Okay" was written by Nivea along with The-Dream, Traci Hale and Lil Jon as well as J-Bo and Sean Paul from YoungBloodZ. Conceived by Nash, the song was initially intended to be recorded by Jennifer Lopez, with Nivea laying down vocals for a demo version. He liked her version so much that he spoke out against the efforts of several Jive Records executives to place the song on Ciara's debut album Goodies (2004).

== Composition ==
"Okay" is a crunk song.

== Critical reception ==
In a review of Complicated, Angie Romero of Vibe wrote that Nivea "falls back on the usual tricks of the trade", regarding the appearances of Lil Jon and YoungBloodZ as an example.

== Charts ==
Chart performance for "Okay"
Chart (2004–2005)	Peak position
Netherlands Urban (MegaCharts)	6
New Zealand (Recorded Music NZ)	28
US Billboard Hot 100	40
US Hot R&B/Hip-Hop Songs (Billboard)	14
