= Black Menace =

American hip hop group

- Origin: New Orleans, Louisiana
- Genres: Hip-hop, gangsta rap
- Years active: 1989–2001
- Labels: Hollygrove, Big Boy, Menace G-Slimm
- Past members: Ronald Jones, Jr.; Wilson Williams; Edward Woods

Black Menace was an American gangsta rap group from New Orleans, Louisiana, active from 1989 to 2001.

== History ==
Black Menace was formed in 1989, with its initial lineup consisting of Ronald Jones Jr., Wilson Williams, and Edward Woods. The members met each other while competing against each other in The Gong Show. When they started performing as a group, they won first place in the show for the next few months. After the show ended, they sought investors to back their musical career and collaborated with DJ Precise, who produced their first EP, which was published by Hollygrove Records in 1992. After the LP released, they were signed onto Prime Suspect Productions, who published their first LP, A Warning to Amerikka the same year.

They collaborated with Odyssey Records to produce an album, although it was never released. Despite that, it allowed them to leave Prime Suspect, causing them to be signed onto Big Boy Records several years later, alongside Mystikal, Ghetto Twiinz, Boot Camp Clicc, G-Slimm, and Tim Smooth. The group released their first album, Really Doe, in 1993. They released their second Drama Time in August 1995 via Big Boy Records, It became the group's most successful album, peaking at No. 48 on the US Top R&B Albums chart and spending eight weeks there. Additionally, it peaked at No. 35 on Cashbox's Top 75 R&B Albums chart.

Following Drama Time, the group went inactive, although they released two more albums in the early 2000s, Mo Drama in 2000 and IV Horseman in 2001. They have not released any albums since.

== Discography ==
- Really Doe (1993)
- Drama Time (1995)
- Mo Drama (2000)
- The IV Horsemen (2001)
