= Ghetto Fabolous =

Studio album by Fabolous
- Released: September 11, 2001
- Recorded: 2000–2001
- Studios: Right Track Studios (New York, NY); Desert Storm Studios; PatchWerk Recording Studios (Atlanta, GA); Manhattan Center Studios (New York, NY)
- Genres: Hip hop; gangsta rap
- Length: 63:11
- Labels: Elektra; Desert Storm
- Producers: Armando Colon; DJ Clue?; DJ Envy; Duro; Just Blaze; Mono; Omen; Red Spyda; Rick Rock; Rockwilder; The Neptunes; Timbaland

Fabolous chronology
Ghetto Fabolous (2001)	Street Dreams (2003)

Singles from Ghetto Fabolous
- 1. "Can't Deny It" Released: June 19, 2001; 2. "Young'n (Holla Back)" Released: January 15, 2002; 3. "Trade It All" Released: 2002

Ghetto Fabolous is the debut studio album by American rapper Fabolous. It was released on September 11, 2001 through Elektra Records and DJ Clue?'s Desert Storm Records. Production was handled by DJ Clue?, Duro, Armando Colon, DJ Envy, Just Blaze, Mono, Omen, Red Spyda, Rick Rock, Rockwilder, The Neptunes and Timbaland.

Ghetto Fabolous was supported by three singles: "Can't Deny It", Young'n (Holla Back)" and "Trade It All". The album received mixed critical reviews, and was a commercial success. The album debuted at number four on the US Billboard 200 chart, selling 143,000 copies in its first week. The album was certified platinum by the Recording Industry Association of America (RIAA).

== Singles ==
The first single from the album was "Can't Deny It". The single was produced by Rick Rock, and features a chorus by Nate Dogg that alters lyrics from 2Pac's "Ambitionz az a Ridah". The single peaked at number 25 on the US Billboard Hot 100. The second single from the album, "Young'n (Holla Back)", which was produced by The Neptunes. The single peaked at number 33. The third single from the album, "Trade It All", featuring vocals from Jagged Edge and produced by DJ Clue and Duro. It reached number 20, becoming the highest-charting single from the album. All three singles had supporting music videos.

== Critical reception ==
Professional ratings
Review scores
Source	Rating
AllMusic	3/5 stars
Entertainment Weekly	C
HipHopDX	3.0/5
New York Post	2.5/4 stars
Pitchfork	7.2/10
RapReviews	6/10
Rolling Stone	3.5/5 stars
USA Today	3/4 stars

Rolling Stone writer Kris Ex noted how the album contained "by-the-numbers danceable bounces" and "predictable thug rhyme themes" throughout the track listing but said that, "Ghetto Fabolous is the most entertaining argument for hip-hop excess to come along in a while, due to Fab's ability to add lyrical twists and turns to the genre." DeMarco Williams of HipHopDX gave praise to Fabolous' "dynamic presence" and "rhyming skills" being reminiscent of Jay-Z and Jadakiss, concluding that "if you can get over the fact that his tracks have no heart, it's well worth a cop." Entertainment Weekly writer Craig Seymour commended Fab's "Mase-like flow" on "Keepin' It Gangsta" and "Can't Deny It" but found it "too one-dimensional" to elevate the rest of the track listing, saying "this hip-hop newcomer doesn't live up to his deliberately misspelled moniker." Steve 'Flash' Juon of RapReviews highlighted the contributions from Timbaland, Rick Rock and DJ Envy as being "energetic and listenable" but felt that Fabolous was "vexing" as an artist for having a dated grab bag of references and DJ Clue lacking quality beats outside of "Trade It All" and "Ride for This", concluding that, "[T]he shame of this album is that by failing to make a huge dent, Fabolous ends up being lumped in with similar rappers like Jadakiss and Ma$e instead of dropping an industry bomb worthy of his star-studded name."

== Commercial performance ==
Ghetto Fabolous debuted at number four on the US Billboard 200 chart and number two on the US Billboard Top R&B/Hip-Hop Albums chart, selling 143,000 copies in its first week. This became Fabolous' first US top-ten debut. On February 3, 2003, the album was certified platinum by the Recording Industry Association of America (RIAA) for shipments of over a million copies in the US. As of March 2003, the album has sold 1.05 million copies in the United States.

== Track listing ==
No.	Title	Writer(s)	Producer(s)	Length
1.	"Click & Spark"	John Jackson; Ernesto Shaw; Kenneth Ifill	DJ Clue?; Duro	2:04
2.	"Keepin' It Gangsta"	Jackson; Shaw; Ifill	DJ Clue?; Duro	4:07
3.	"Young'n (Holla Back)"	Jackson; Chad Hugo; Pharrell Williams	The Neptunes	3:26
4.	"Get Right"	Jackson; Dana Stinson	Rockwilder	4:35
5.	"Ride for This" (featuring Ja Rule)	Jackson; Shaw; Ifill	DJ Clue?; Duro	3:18
6.	"One Day"	Jackson; Sidney Brown	Omen	4:38
7.	"Trade It All" (featuring Jagged Edge)	Jackson; Brandon Casey; Brian Casey; Shaw; Ifill	DJ Clue?; Duro	5:19
8.	"Right Now & Later On"	Jackson; Timothy Mosley	Timbaland	4:00
9.	"Take You Home" (featuring Lil' Mo)	Jackson; Shaw; Ifill	DJ Clue?; Duro	3:58
10.	"Get Smart"	Jackson; Andy Thelusma	Rush Da Spyda	3:45
11.	"Can't Deny It" (featuring Nate Dogg)	Jackson; Nathaniel Hale; Ricardo Thomas	Rick Rock	5:06
12.	"Ma' Be Easy"	Jackson; Justin Smith	Just Blaze	3:45
13.	"We Don't Give a Fuck"	Jackson; Armando Colon	Armando Colon	3:17
14.	"Bad Guy" (featuring Pain in Da Ass)	Jackson; RaaShaun Casey; Renan Thybulle	DJ Envy; Mono	2:59
Total length:				54:34

Bonus tracks
No.	Title	Writer(s)	Producer	Length
15.	"Gotta Be Thug"	Jackson; Shaw; Ifill	DJ Clue?; Duro	3:58
16.	"If They Want It"	Jackson; Shaw; Ifill	DJ Clue?; Duro	4:39
Total length:				63:11

Sample credits

- Track 4 embodies portions of "Player's Anthem" written by Harvey Fuqua, Londie Wiggins, Kimberly Jones, James Lloyd, Rodolfo Franklin and Christopher Wallace.
- Track 9 contains an interpolation of "I Wonder If I Take You Home" written by Curt Bedeau, Gerry Charles, Hugh L Clarke, Brian George, Lucien George and Paul George.
- Track 11 contains elements of "Ambitionz az a Ridah" written in part by Tupac Shakur and Delmar Arnaud.

== Charts ==
=== Weekly charts ===
Chart (2001)	Peak position
US Billboard 200	4
US Top R&B/Hip-Hop Albums (Billboard)	2

=== Year-end charts ===
Chart (2001)	Position
Canadian R&B Albums (Nielsen SoundScan)	128
Canadian Rap Albums (Nielsen SoundScan)	66
US Billboard 200	158
US Top R&B/Hip-Hop Albums (Billboard)	67
Chart (2002)	Position
Canadian R&B Albums (Nielsen SoundScan)	165
Canadian Rap Albums (Nielsen SoundScan)	85
US Billboard 200	200
US Top R&B/Hip-Hop Albums (Billboard)	89

== Certifications ==
Region	Certification	Certified units/sales
United States (RIAA)	Platinum	1,000,000^{^}
^{^} Shipments figures based on certification alone.
