= Young'n (Holla Back) =

Single by Fabolous

from the album Ghetto Fabolous
- Released: December 2001
- Recorded: September 2000
- Studio: Right Track Studios (New York City)
- Genre: Hip-hop
- Length: 3:26
- Label: Elektra
- Songwriters: John Jackson; Pharrell Williams; Charles Hugo
- Producer: The Neptunes

Fabolous singles chronology
"Can't Deny It" (2001)	"Young'n (Holla Back)" (2001)	"Basketball" (2002)

"Young'n (Holla Back)" is the second single from Fabolous' debut album Ghetto Fabolous. It peaked at number thirty-three on the Billboard Hot 100 and number seventeen on the Hot R&B/Hip-Hop Singles & Tracks chart. The song was also used in much promotion material for the popular video game Need for Speed: Underground, and was featured as soundtrack in the game's demo but was seemingly removed from the final cut.

== Charts ==
=== Weekly charts ===
Chart (2002)	Peak position
US Billboard Hot 100	33
US Hot R&B/Hip-Hop Songs (Billboard)	17
US Hot Rap Songs (Billboard)	8
US Pop Airplay (Billboard)	31
US Rhythmic Airplay (Billboard)	9

=== Year-end charts ===
Chart (2002)	Position
US Hot R&B/Hip-Hop Songs (Billboard)	73
