= Don't Mess with My Man (Nivea song) =

2002 single by Nivea

Single by Nivea featuring Jagged Edge

from the album Nivea
- B-side: "Check Your Man"
- Released: June 3, 2002
- Length: 3:32
- Label: Jive
- Songwriters: Bryan-Michael Cox, Brandon Casey
- Producer: Bryan-Michael Cox

Nivea singles chronology
"Run Away (I Wanna Be with U)" (2001)	"Don't Mess with My Man" (2002)	"Laundromat" (2003)

Jagged Edge singles chronology
"I Got It 2" (2001)	"Don't Mess with My Man" (2002)	"Trade It All, Pt. 2" (2002)

"Don't Mess with My Man" is a song by American R&B singer Nivea featuring Brian and Brandon Casey from R&B group Jagged Edge. It was released in on June 3, 2002, as the third single from her self-titled debut album (2001). The song peaked at number eight on the Billboard Hot 100 and was an international hit as well, reaching the top 10 in France and New Zealand and receiving a gold certification in the former country.

In the United Kingdom, the song was released twice: once as a solo single in 2002—reaching number 41 on the UK Singles Chart—and again as a double A-side with "Laundromat" in 2003, reaching number 33 on the same chart. The recording earned the artists a nomination for Best R&B Performance by a Duo or Group with Vocals at the 45th Annual Grammy Awards in 2003.

== Music video ==
Nzingha Stewart directed a music video for an alternate version of the song, which premiered in June 2002. The video's background singers featured clothing from Hendricks Apparel Group's Raw Jean collection.

== Track listings ==
=== Solo release ===
US CD single

1. "Don't Mess with My Man" (main version) – 3:35
2. "Don't Mess with My Man" (version 2) – 3:35
3. "Don't Mess with the Radio" (video)
4. "Don't Mess with My Man" (video)

UK CD single

1. "Don't Mess with My Man" (main version) – 3:36
2. "Don't Mess with My Man" (album version) – 3:36
3. "Check Your Man" (featuring Mystikal) – 3:47
4. "Don't Mess with My Man" (video) – 3:36

UK 12-inch single

A1. "Don't Mess with My Man" (main version) – 3:36
A2. "Don't Mess with My Man" (album version) – 3:36
B1. "Check Your Man" (featuring Mystikal) – 3:47

European CD single

1. "Don't Mess with My Man" (main version) – 3:36
2. "Don't Mess with My Man" (album version) – 3:36

Australian CD single

1. "Don't Mess with My Man" (Bryan-Michael Cox remix) – 3:54
2. "Don't Mess with My Man" (Burn Unit remix featuring Mystikal) – 3:54
3. "Don't Mess with My Man" (version 1 main clean) – 3:36
4. "Don't Mess with My Man" (Allstar remix featuring Petey Pablo) – 3:46

=== 2003 UK re-release ===
UK CD single

1. "Laundromat" (radio edit) – 4:25
2. "Don't Mess with My Man" (remix) – 3:52
3. "Laundromat" (instrumental) – 4:23
4. "Laundromat" (video)

UK 12-inch single

A1. "Laundromat" (radio edit)
A2. "Laundromat" (instrumental)
AA1. "Don't Mess with My Man" (remix)

== Charts ==
=== Weekly charts ===
Weekly chart performance for "Don't Mess with My Man"
Chart (2002–2003)	Peak position
Australia (ARIA)	28
Australian Urban (ARIA)	10
Belgium (Ultratip Bubbling Under Wallonia)	11
Canada CHR (Nielsen BDS)	18
Canada (Nielsen SoundScan)	15
Europe (European Hot 100 Singles)	32
France (SNEP)	8
Germany (GfK)	90
New Zealand (Recorded Music NZ)	10
Scotland Singles (OCC)	100
Switzerland (Schweizer Hitparade)	90
UK Singles (OCC)	41
UK Indie (OCC)	6
UK Hip Hop/R&B (OCC)	4
US Billboard Hot 100	8
US Hot R&B/Hip-Hop Songs (Billboard)	25
US Pop Airplay (Billboard)	4
US Rhythmic Airplay (Billboard)	5

Weekly chart performance with "Laundromat"
Chart (2003)	Peak position
Scotland Singles (OCC)	89
UK Singles (OCC)	33
UK Hip Hop/R&B (OCC)	8
UK Indie (OCC)	2

=== Year-end charts ===
Year-end chart performance for "Don't Mess with My Man"
Chart (2002)	Position
Canada (Nielsen SoundScan)	72
UK Urban (Music Week)	29
US Hot R&B/Hip-Hop Singles & Tracks (Billboard)	90
US Rhythmic Top 40 (Billboard)	45

Chart (2003)	Position
France (SNEP)	72
US Billboard Hot 100	38
US Mainstream Top 40 (Billboard)	16
US Rhythmic Top 40 (Billboard)	54

== Certifications ==
Certifications for "Don't Mess with My Man"
Region	Certification	Certified units/sales
France (SNEP)	Gold	250,000^{*}
New Zealand (RMNZ)	Platinum	30,000^{‡}
^{*} Sales figures based on certification alone.^{‡} Sales+streaming figures based on certification alone.

== Release history ==
Release dates and formats for "Don't Mess with My Man"
Region	Date	Format(s)	Label(s)	Ref.
United States	June 3, 2002	Rhythmic contemporary; urban radio	Jive	
United Kingdom	September 9, 2002	12-inch vinyl; CD	Jive	
United Kingdom	September 16, 2002	Cassette	Jive	
United States	October 21, 2002	Contemporary hit radio	Jive	
Australia	February 24, 2003	CD	Jive	
Belgium	March 30, 2003	CD; maxi CD	Jive	
United Kingdom (re-release)	April 28, 2003	12-inch vinyl; CD; cassette	Jive	
