= Grammy Award for Best Male Rap Solo Performance =

Defunct music award

- Awarded for: Quality male rap performances
- Country: United States
- Presented by: National Academy of Recording Arts and Sciences
- First award: 2003
- Final award: 2004
- Website: grammy.com

The Grammy Award for Best Male Rap Solo Performance was an honor presented to male recording artists at the 45th Grammy Awards in 2003 and the 46th Grammy Awards in 2004 for quality rap solo performances. The Grammy Awards, an annual ceremony that was established in 1958, and originally called the Gramophone Awards, are presented by the National Academy of Recording Arts and Sciences of the United States to "honor artistic achievement, technical proficiency and overall excellence in the recording industry, without regard to album sales or chart position".

Starting in 1991, the academy began to honor individual rap performances with the Best Rap Solo Performance category. In 2003, the category was divided by gender with the introduction of the Female to accompany the award for Male Rap Solo Performances. The categories remained separated by gender until 2005 when they were combined into the genderless category originally known as Best Rap Solo Performance. American singers Nelly and Eminem received the awards for Best Male Rap Solo Performance.

== Background ==
In 1991, the academy began to honor individual rap performances with the Best Rap Solo Performance category. The category name remained unchanged until 2004 when it was split into separate categories for Female and Male Rap Solo Performances. The categories remained separated by gender for one additional year. In 2005, they were merged into the genderless category originally known as Best Rap Solo Performance. Female rapper MC Lyte has campaigned for the reinstatement of the female-specific category and believes that "it destroys [hip-hop] culture to not have the perspective of a woman". Bill Freimuth, Recording Academy Vice President of Awards, claimed that the category was eliminated because "[there] wasn't enough competition essentially, due to the lack of the number of releases in that category." Black Entertainment Television (BET) executive Stephen Hill cited a similar reason for the elimination of the female categories by the BET Hip Hop Awards and VH1's Hip Hop Honors, reflecting a lack of female representation in the hip hop music scene for several years. As of 2011, the category name has not changed since 2005.

== Recipients ==
| Year | Winner(s) | Title | Nominees | Ref. |
|---|---|---|---|---|
| 2003 | Nelly | "Hot In Herre" | Eminem for "Without Me"; Jay-Z for "Song Cry"; Ludacris for "Rollout (My Business)"; Mystikal for "Bouncin' Back (Bumpin' Me Against the Wall)" | |
| 2004 | Eminem | "Lose Yourself" | Joe Budden for "Pump It Up"; 50 Cent for "In da Club"; Ludacris for "Stand Up"; Sean Paul for "Get Busy" | |

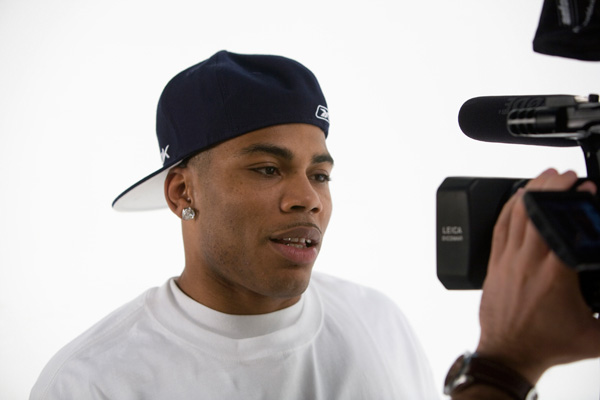
2003 award winner Nelly in 2007

For the 45th Grammy Awards (2003), Best Male Rap Solo Performance nominees included: Eminem for "Without Me", Jay-Z for "Song Cry", Ludacris for "Rollout (My Business)", Mystikal for "Bouncin' Back (Bumpin' Me Against the Wall)", and Nelly for "Hot in Herre". Additionally Eminem was nominated for: Record of the Year and Best Short Form Music Video for "Without Me" as well as Album of the Year and Best Rap Album for The Eminem Show. Ludacris' Word of Mouf and Mystikal's Tarantula were also nominated for Best Rap Album. Nelly also earned nominations for Album of the Year and Best Rap Album for the album Nellyville as well as Record of the Year and Best Rap/Sung Collaboration for the song "Dilemma" (featuring Kelly Rowland), for a total five. Regarding his nominations, Nelly commented: "It's always good to be nominated, especially for something as big as the Grammys. Just the recognition itself is an award. But you want that little gold record player. You just want to take it home." The award for Best Male Rap Solo Performance was presented to Nelly at Madison Square Garden in New York City, though not broadcast on television. His performances of "Hot in Herre" and "Dilemma" alongside Rowland at the awards ceremony included pyrotechnics. In addition, Nelly received the Grammy Award for Best Rap/Sung Collaboration.

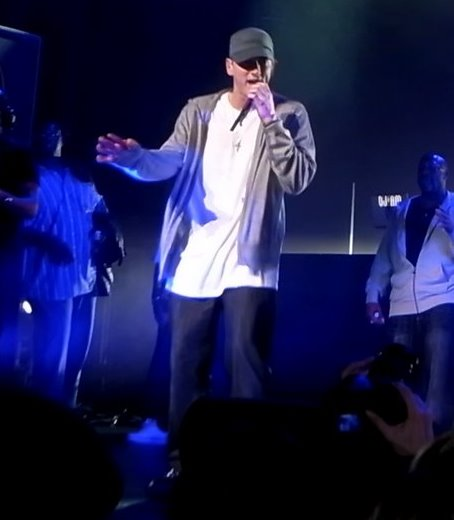
2004 award winner Eminem performing in 2009

Nominees for the 46th Grammy Awards included: 50 Cent for "In da Club", Joe Budden for "Pump It Up", Eminem for "Lose Yourself", Ludacris for "Stand Up", and Sean Paul for "Get Busy". 50 Cent's other nominations included Best New Artist and Best Rap Performance by a Duo or Group (with Lil' Kim), Best Rap Album for Get Rich or Die Tryin', and Best Rap Song for "In da Club", for a total of five. "Lose Yourself" also earned Eminem nominations for Record of the Year, Song of the Year, Best Rap Song, and Best Song Written for a Motion Picture, Television or Other Visual Media. Ludacris was also nominated for Best Rap Performance by a Duo or Group for "Gossip Folks" (with Missy Elliott), while Paul was nominated for Best New Artist and received the award for Best Reggae Album for Dutty Rock. The award was presented to Eminem, who also received the award for Best Rap Song. "Lose Yourself" also earned Eminem an Academy Award for Best Original Song, marking the first rap song to receive the honor. In 2004, the American Film Institute included the song at No. 93 on their list of "America's Greatest Music in the Movies" list and Rolling Stone ranked the song No. 166 on their list of "The 500 Greatest Songs of All Time".

Prior to the separate female and male categories, Eminem received the award for Best Rap Solo Performance in 2000 for "My Name Is" and in 2001 for "The Real Slim Shady". Nelly earned nominations in 2001 for "Country Grammar (Hot Shit)" and in 2002 for "Ride wit Me". Following the return to the genderless category, Eminem earned nominations in 2005 for "Just Lose It", in 2006 for "Mockingbird", and in 2010 for "Beautiful". Eminem was presented the award for Best Rap Solo Performance in 2011 for "Not Afraid".

== See also ==
- Grammy Award for Best Rap Performance
- History of hip hop music
- List of awards and nominations received by Eminem
- List of awards and nominations received by Nelly
