= Can't Deny It =

2001 single by Fabolous featuring Nate Dogg

Single by Fabolous featuring Nate Dogg

from the album Ghetto Fabolous
- Released: June 19, 2001
- Recorded: 2001
- Studio: Right Track Studios, NYC
- Genre: East Coast hip hop; gangsta rap
- Length: 5:04 (album version); 4:18 (radio edit)
- Label: Elektra
- Songwriter(s): N. Hale; J. J. Jackson; Rahiem Prince Thomas
- Producer(s): Rick Rock

Fabolous singles chronology
"Superwoman Pt. II" (2001)	"Can't Deny It" (2001)	"Young'n (Holla Back)" (2001)

Nate Dogg single singles chronology
"Lay Low" (2001)	"Can't Deny It" (2001)	"Area Codes" (2001)

"Can't Deny It" is the debut single by American rapper Fabolous from his debut studio album Ghetto Fabolous. It features Nate Dogg and uncredited backing vocals by Lil' Mo. The song was produced by Rick Rock. Its chorus contains similar lyrics to the chorus of 2Pac's "Ambitionz az a Ridah".

== Official versions ==
- Can't Deny It (Album Version) / (LP Version) 5:04
- Can't Deny It (Radio Edit) 4:18

== Charts ==
=== Weekly charts ===
Chart (2001)	Peak position
US Billboard Hot 100	25
US Hot R&B/Hip-Hop Songs (Billboard)	13
US Hot Rap Songs (Billboard)	11
US Rhythmic (Billboard)	5

=== Year-end charts ===
Chart (2001)	Position
US Hot R&B/Hip-Hop Songs (Billboard)	56

== Personnel ==
- Aladdin – A&R
- Clue – Executive Producer, A&R
- Tom Coyne – Mastering
- E Bass – Producer
- Paul Gregory – Engineer
- Nick Howard – Engineer
- Just Blaze – Producer
- Rick Rock – Producer
- Skane – Executive Producer
- Jason Stasium – Engineer
