= Nivea (album) =

Studio album by Nivea
- Released: February 18, 2002
- Length: 54:49
- Label: Jive
- Producers: Teddy Bishop; Leslie Braithwaite; Burn-Unit; Carlos & Dada; Bryan-Michael Cox; Roy "Royalty" Hamilton; R. Kelly; The Neptunes; Organized Noise; Paul Poli; Scorpio & Mystery; Adonis Shropshire; Swift C; Twin Beats

Nivea chronology
Nivea (2002)	Complicated (2005)

Singles from Nivea
- 1. "Don't Mess with the Radio" Released: June 12, 2001; 2. "Run Away (I Wanna Be with U)" Released: December 10, 2001; 3. "Don't Mess with My Man" Released: June 3, 2002; 4. "Laundromat" Released: April 28, 2003

Nivea is the debut studio album by American singer Nivea. It was released on February 18, 2002, by Jive Records. Nivea worked with a wide range of producers and songwriters on the album, including Leslie Braithwaite, Bryan-Michael Cox, Roy "Royalty" Hamilton, R. Kelly, The Neptunes, Organized Noise, Adonis Shropshire, Teedra Moses, Johnta Austin, and Ne-Yo. The final product was an R&B record heavily influenced by hip hop and pop.

Upon its release, Nivea peaked at number 80 on the US Billboard 200 and number 35 on the Top R&B/Hip-Hop Albums. The album produced five singles, including "Don't Mess with the Radio", which became a top-20 hit in Australia, and "Don't Mess with My Man", a collaboration with Brandon Casey and Brian Casey from Jagged Edge, which became a top-10 hit in France, New Zealand and on the US Billboard Hot 100.

== Background ==
In 1997, Nivea met manager Collin Lampkin of Atlanta-based Lampkin International, who arranged for her to record a demo tape with several producers. Local production team Organized Noize, consisting of Sleepy Brown, Ray Murray, and Rico Wade, eventually became instrumental in crafting the tape. At the time when she was asked to audition for Jive Records to secure a recording deal with the label, Nivea had already recorded 26 completed songs.

== Promotion ==
"Don't Mess with the Radio" was selected as Nivea's solo debut single and was released on June 12, 2001. While not a major hit in the United States or most other countries, it was a top-twenty success in Australia, reaching number 14 on the ARIA Singles Chart. In April 2002, the song was released in the United Kingdom as a double A-side with "Run Away (I Wanna Be with U)". It peaked at number 48 on the UK Singles Chart. In Australia, "Run Away" was released as the album's second single on December 10, 2001.

"Don't Mess with My Man" was released on June 3, 2002, as the third single from the album. The song peaked at number eight on the US Billboard Hot 100 and was an international hit as well, reaching the top 10 in France and New Zealand and receiving a Gold certification in the former country. In the United Kingdom, the song reached number 41 on the UK Singles Chart upon its initial release. The recording earned the artists a nomination for Best R&B Performance by a Duo or Group with Vocals at the 45th Grammy Awards in 2003.

The fourth single, "Laundromat", was released on April 28, 2003. The song peaked in the United States at number 58 on the Billboard Hot 100 and number 20 on the Hot R&B/Hip-Hop Songs chart. Internationally, it reached a peak number 33 on the UK Singles Chart as a double A-side with "Don't Mess with My Man".

== Critical reception ==
Professional ratings
Review scores
Source	Rating
AllMusic	3/5 stars

Alex Henderson from AllMusic rated Nivea three out of five stars and called it "a perfect example of how hip-hop-drenched R&B [had] become" by 2001: "From the production to the lyrics, this CD frequently underscores hip-hop's influence on modern R&B." He found that "Nivea provides a likable blend of girlishness and grit on catchy, hip-hop-minded offerings", while also being "teen-friendly, although not in a bubblegum way; in Nivea's case, teen-friendly doesn't mean teen pop." Henderson concluded: "But if Nivea's debut is slightly uneven, it still has more ups than downs and is — thanks to the more on-the-ball producers and writers — worth the price of admission."

== Chart performance ==
Nivea debuted at number 109 on the US Billboard 200 in the week of December 28, 2002. It eventually peaked at number 80 in February 2003. By March 2003, the album had sold 134,000 copies in the United States, according to Nielsen SoundScan.

== Track listing ==
Nivea – Standard edition
No.	Title	Writer(s)	Producer(s)	Length
1.	"Still in Love"	Cortez Harris; Teedra Moses; Paul Poli; Dorothy Runner; Shaffer Smith	Poli	3:33
2.	"Ya Ya Ya" (featuring Lil Wayne)	Robert Kelly; Dwayne Carter, Jr.	R. Kelly	4:07
3.	"Don't Mess with My Man" (featuring Jagged Edge)	Brandon Casey; Brian Casey; Bryan-Michael Cox	Cox	3:34
4.	"The One for Me"	Nivea Hamilton; Kelly; Timothy Allen; Larry Campbell	Scorpio & Mystery; R. Kelly^{[A]}	3:35
5.	"Laundromat"	Kelly	R. Kelly	4:24
6.	"You Don't Even Know" (featuring Nick Cannon)	N. Hamilton; James Brown; Adonis Shropshire; John Starks; Fred Wesley	Shropshire	3:55
7.	"Run Away (I Wanna Be with U)" (featuring Pusha T)	Pharrell Williams; Chad Hugo	The Neptunes	3:43
8.	"Just in Case"	N. Hamilton; Leslie Braithwaite; Garfield Duncan; James Harris; Terrance Kelly; Terry Lewis; Tim Patterson; Dexter Archer; Jasper Cameron	Braithwaite	3:59
9.	"No Doubt"	Johnta Austin; Teddy Bishop	Bishop	4:06
10.	"Never Had a Girl Like Me"	N. Hamilton; Allen; Brown; Campbell; Lyn Collins	Scorpio & Mystery	3:53
11.	"Have Mercy"	Irish Grinstead; Lemisha Grinstead; Carlos Thornton; Benny Tillman; D'Wayne Wiggins; Kameelah Williams	Carlos & Dada	3:52
12.	"Don't Mess with the Radio"	Cedric Barnett; Marqueze Etheridge; Ray Murray; Rico Wade; Jamahr Williams; Patrick Brown; Brandon Bennett	Organized Noize; Swift C	3:58
13.	"25 Reasons"	N. Hamilton; Brathwaite; Cameron	Braithwaite	4:07
14.	"Don't Mess with My Man" (Remix) (featuring Jagged Edge and Mystikal) (bonus track)	Brandon Casey; Brian Casey; Cox	Cox	3:52

Nivea – Australian and New Zealand hidden track
No.	Title	Length
15.	"I Love My Man (I'm Keepin' Him)"	3:13

Nivea – Reissue
No.	Title	Writer(s)	Producer(s)	Length
14.	"What You Waitin' For"	Hamilton; Ralph Kearns; James Maynes; Steven A. White	Burn-Unit	3:36
15.	"Check Your Man" (featuring Mystikal)	Hamilton; Michael Tyler; James Brown; Betty Jean Newsome; Luther Campbell	Scorpio & Mystery	3:48
16.	"Cat's Got Your Tongue"	Lampson; Forbes; N. Hamilton; R. Hamilton; Hoskins	Roy "Royalty" Hamilton	3:15
17.	"Jewelry"	C. Jerkins; E. Jerkins; R. Hamilton; Rockwell	Royalty; Twin Beats^{[A]}	3:29
18.	"Problems"	Sylvers; R. Hamilton; Hoskins	Hamilton	3:41
19.	"Don't Mess with My Man" (Remix) (featuring Jagged Edge and Mystikal) (bonus track)	Brandon Casey; Brian Casey; Tyler; Cox	Cox	3:52

Nivea – International edition
No.	Title	Writer(s)	Producer(s)	Length
1.	"Check Your Man" (featuring Mystikal)	N. Hamilton; Michael Tyler; James Brown; Betty Jean Newsome; Luther Campbell	Scorpio & Mystery	3:48
2.	"Cat's Got Your Tongue"	Carmen Lampson; Claude "Quo" Forbes; N. Hamilton; Roy Hamilton; Samuel "Cyph" Hoskins	Roy "Royalty" Hamilton	3:15
3.	"Radio (Interlude)"			0:34
4.	"Don't Mess with the Radio"	Cedric Barnett; Marqueze Etheridge; Ray Murray; Rico Wade; Jamahr Williams; Patrick Brown; Brandon Bennett	Organized Noize; Swift C	3:58
5.	"Don't Mess with My Man" (Remix) (featuring Jagged Edge and Mystikal)	Brandon Casey; Brian Casey; Bryan-Michael Cox	Cox	3:34
6.	"Problems"	Leon Sylvers III; R. Hamilton; Hoskins	Royalty	3:41
7.	"Jewelry"	C. Jerkins; E. Jerkins; R. Hamilton; Rockwell	Royalty; Twin Beats^{[A]}	3:29
8.	"Never Had a Girl Like Me"	Hamilton; Allen; Brown; Campbell; Lyn Collins	Scorpio & Mystery	3:53
9.	"Just in Case"	Hamilton; Leslie Braithwaite; Garfield Duncan; James Harris; Terrance Kelly; Terry Lewis; Tim Patterson; Dexter Archer; Jasper Cameron	Braithwaite	3:59
10.	"Phone (Interlude)"			0:37
11.	"25 Reasons"	Hamilton; Brathwaite; Cameron	Braithwaite	4:07
12.	"Argument (Interlude)"			1:06
13.	"Have Mercy"	Irish Grinstead; Lemisha Grinstead; Carlos Thornton; Benny Tillman; D'Wayne Wiggins; Kameelah Williams	Carlos & Dada	3:52
14.	"No Doubt"	Johnta Austin; Teddy Bishop	Bishop	4:06
15.	"Run Away (I Wanna Be with U)" (featuring Pusha T of the Clipse)	Pharrell Williams; Chad Hugo	The Neptunes	3:43
16.	"I Love My Man (I'm Keepin' Him)"			3:13

Notes

- ^{^[A]} denotes co-producer

Sample credits

- "Still in Love" samples Alicia Myers's "Concentrate On Love".
- "You Don't Even Know" samples James Brown's "The Payback".
- "Just in Case" samples Lost Boyz's "Renee".
- "Never Had a Girl Like Me" samples Lyn Collins's "Think (About It)".
- "25 Reasons" samples Blu's "Clap Your Hands".
- "Check Your Man" samples James Brown's "It's A Man's Man's Man's World".

== Personnel ==
Credits are taken from the album's liner notes.

Instruments and performances

- Donnie Lyle – guitar
- Charles Pettaway – guitar
- Malachy Robinson – guitar
- Swift C – drums
- PJ Morton – piano, keyboards
- R. Kelly – arranger

Production

- Ted Bishop – engineering, instrumentation
- Leslie Braithwaite – engineering, mixing
- Tom Coyne – mastering
- Ryan Freeland – engineering
- Andy Gallas – engineering
- Jeffrey Gamble – photography
- Elisa Garcia – design
- Abel Garibaldi – engineering
- Serban Ghenea – mixing
- Jay Goin – engineering
- Mark Goodchild – engineering
- Hachi – photography
- Chaz Harper – mastering
- R. Kelly – mixing
- C.L. Lampkin – backing vocals
- Ian Mereness – engineering, mixing
- Rowie Nameri – engineering
- Azuolas Sinkevicius – engineering
- Brian Stanley – engineering
- Adonis Shropshire – engineering
- Richard Travali – mixing
- Patrick Viala – mixing
- Bernasky Wall – mixing
- Arnold Wolfe – mixing

== Charts ==
Weekly chart performance for Nivea
Chart (2002–03)	Peak position
Canadian R&B Albums (Nielsen SoundScan)	29
French Albums (SNEP)	65
Japanese Albums (Oricon)	37
US Billboard 200	80
US Heatseekers Albums (Billboard)	1
US Top R&B/Hip-Hop Albums (Billboard)	35

== Release history ==
Release dates and formats for Nivea
Region	Date	Format(s)	Label(s)	Ref.
Germany	February 18, 2002	CD	Rough Trade	
United States	December 10, 2002 (Note: Originally slated for September 11, 2001)	Cassette; CD	Jive	
Japan	January 29, 2003	CD	BMG Japan	
United Kingdom	February 3, 2003	CD; vinyl	Jive	
France	March 10, 2003	CD	Jive	
