= Big Boy Records =

Record label

- Founded: 1992
- Founder: Charles "Big Boy" Temple; Robert "Big Rob" Shaw"; Leroy "Precise" Edwards
- Status: Active
- Genre: Hip hop, R&B
- Country of origin: United States
- Location: Kenner, Louisiana, U.S.
- Official website: www.bigboyrecordsinc.com

Big Boy Records, also known as the Boot Camp Clicc, is an independent record label established in late 1992 by Charles "Big Boy" Temple, Robert "Big Rob" Shaw", and his producer Leroy "Precise" Edwards. In the early 1990s, the label was prominent in Southern hip hop music until the emergence of Master P's No Limit Records and Birdman's Cash Money Records later that decade.

== History ==
Big Boy's first signee was pioneering New Orleans rapper Sporty T (Terence Vine). He had previously been a founding member of The Ninja Crew, New Orleans' first rap group to record. In the early 1990s, inspired by hits by Juvenile and Everlasting Hitman's bounce hits, he moved in that direction as well. The label's first single was "Sporty Talkin' Sporty." Though bounce, it had an uncharacteristically heavy sound for the genre. After it sold 4,000 copies, Big Boy sought out more talent. In that same year Big Boy Signed Partners-N-Crime, a rapping duo from Hollygrove, New Orleans. When they dropped their single "Ride It, Roll It" in 1994 it became an instant hit. Months later their debut album PNC 3 hit the stores. Later on in that year G-Slimm's Fours Deuces & Trays sold 200,000 copies. However, the label's first huge success came from a recently returned Gulf War veteran, Mystikal (Michael Ernest Tyler). The 12th Ward native had originally been with Parkway Pumpin as Mystikal Mike. Then he was poached by Big Boy, who released "I'm Not That Nigga" and a self-titled debut which sold 300,000 copies. Apparently bolstered by this considerable windfall, Big Boy made most of their promotional videos in the wake. After Mystikal and Fiend signed with No Limit and the death of G-Slimm, Big Boy records slowly began to fall apart. By 1997, Shaw stepped away from Big Boy to launch his own record label, South Coast Music. Partners-N-Crime subsequently left Big Boy that year to sign with South Coast. That same year, Edwards left Big Boy to start "Upper Level Records" and signed The Ghetto Twiinz to his label in a joint venture with Rap-A-Lot. In 2004 they released Big Boy Greatest Hits compilation album featuring all the greatest hits from 1992 to 2000.

In 2015, Charles "Big Boy" Temple died.

== Notable artists ==
- Mystikal
- Ghetto Twiinz
- Partners-N-Crime
- Black Menace
- Fiend
