= Trade It All (song) =

Single by Fabolous featuring Jagged Edge

- Cover art for the remix, "Trade It All, Pt. 2"

Single by Fabolous featuring Jagged Edge

from the album Ghetto Fabolous
- Released: 2002
- Genre: Hip hop, R&B
- Length: 5:19
- Label: Desert Storm, Elektra
- Songwriter: John Jackson
- Producers: DJ Clue, Duro

Fabolous singles chronology
"Automatic" (2002)	"Trade It All" (2002)	"4Ever" (2003)

Jagged Edge singles chronology
"Don't Mess with My Man" (2002)	"Trade It All" (2002)	"Walked Outta Heaven" (2003)

Music video
- "Trade It All Part 2" on YouTube

"Trade It All" is a song by American rapper Fabolous and the third single from his debut studio album Ghetto Fabolous (2001). It features vocals from American R&B group Jagged Edge and was produced by DJ Clue and Duro.

An official remix of the song titled "Trade It All, Pt. 2" additionally features American rapper P. Diddy and appears on the soundtrack of the 2002 film Barbershop, as well as on Fabolous' second studio album Street Dreams (2003) as a bonus track. It peaked at number 20 on the Billboard Hot 100.

The music video features the film's cast along models KD Aubert and Orellana.

== Content ==
The song centers on Fabolous' willingness to trade all of his wealth and assets for a woman he loves and eventually proposes marriage to.

== Critical reception ==
In his review of Ghetto Fabolous, Steve "Flash" Juon of RapReviews wrote in regard to the production, "Clue strikes paydirt with a beat about as often as Big Daddy Kane drops new albums, and this LP is no exception. The one track he does that can truly be called hot is 'Trade it All' featuring Jagged Edge, but co-producer Duro is probably the one responsible for making it fuego." Concerning the remix, Juon commented, "kinda sad when Puffy outraps you". Alphonse Pierre of Pitchfork praised Fabolous' show of confidence in the song, while writing of Jagged Edge's feature, "though the crew belts a chorus that could have been recorded by any of the R&B groups of the era."

In 2013, Complex placed "Trade It All, Pt. 2" at number 18 on their list of "The 25 Best Song Sequels".

== Charts ==
Chart (2002–03)	Peak position
Germany (GfK)	79
US Billboard Hot 100	20
US Hot R&B/Hip-Hop Songs (Billboard)	14
US Hot Rap Songs (Billboard)	8
US Rhythmic Airplay (Billboard)	5
