= Ken "Duro" Ifill =

Trinadadian-American mixing engineer and record producer

Ken Ifill
- Also known as: Duro; Supa Engineer; The Chairman
- Born: Kenneth Ifill; Mineola, New York, U.S.
- Genres: Hip hop; R&B
- Occupations: Record producer; mixing engineer; A&R; record executive
- Years active: 1993–present
- Label: Desert Storm

Ken "Duro" Ifill is a Trinidadian-American mixing engineer, record producer and record executive. He is a co-founder and chief executive officer of Desert Storm Records. In 2011, he was nominated for Grammy Award for Record of the Year at the 53rd Annual Grammy Awards for "Empire State of Mind". Since 2018 he operates as vice president and A&R of Republic Records. Attended Five Towns College, Long Island where he secured his 1st Internship at Platinum Island Recording Studios, Downtown Manhattan. Since 1998, as a record producer, he produced tracks for the likes of Noreaga, Jay-Z, Fabolous, Foxy Brown and Pop Smoke.

== Career ==
=== Early career ===
In the mid-1990s, Duro served as an intern engineer for Q-Tip during the recording of Mobb Deep's The Infamous album. His first credits as mixing engineer were on Gravediggaz debut album.

=== Desert Storm Records ===
In 1997, Duro, DJ Clue, and Skane Dolla (DJ Clue's manager) developed Desert Storm Records. The label's first major artist is rapper Fabolous. In September 2001, Fabolous released his debut album Ghetto Fabolous, charting at No. 4 on the Billboard 200. The label was previously distributed through Interscope, Elektra, Atlantic and Sony. The label is currently distributed through Def Jam.

== Discography ==
=== Partial production discography ===
List of production credits (excluding executive producer credits), showing selected information
| Year | Song | Artist | Album | Notes |
|---|---|---|---|---|
| 1998 | "Thugs R Us" | DJ Clue?, Noreaga | Streets Is Watching Soundtrack | produced w/ DJ Clue? |
| 1998 | "Mathematics (Esta Loca)" | Noreaga | N.O.R.E. | produced w/ DJ Clue? |
| 1999 | "Dope Man" | Jay-Z | Vol. 3... Life and Times of S. Carter | produced w/ DJ Clue? & Darrell "Digga" Branch |
| 1999 | "Pop 4 Roc" | Jay-Z, Beanie Sigel, Memphis Bleek, Amil | Vol. 3... Life and Times of S. Carter | produced w/ DJ Clue? |
| 2000 | "Gotta Be a Thug" | Fabolous | DJ Clue Presents: Backstage Mixtape (Music Inspired by the Film) | produced w/ DJ Clue? |
| 2001 | "Back 2 Life 2001" | Jadakiss, Mary J. Blige | The Professional 2 | produced w/ DJ Clue? |
| 2001 | "Jay-Z Freestyle" | Jay-Z | The Professional 2 | produced w/ DJ Clue? |
| 2001 | "Fantastic Four, Pt. 2" | The Lox, Cam'ron, Nature, Fabolous | The Professional 2 | produced w/ DJ Clue? |
| 2001 | "What the Beat" | Method Man, Bad Meets Evil | The Professional 2 | produced w/ DJ Clue? |
| 2001 | "Interlude" | Lil' Mo | The Professional 2 | produced w/ DJ Clue? |
| 2001 | "Fuck a Bitch" | Snoop Dogg, Kurupt | The Professional 2 | produced w/ DJ Clue? |
| 2001 | "Live from the Bridge" | Nas | The Professional 2 | produced w/ DJ Clue? |
| 2001 | "So Hot" | Foxy Brown | The Professional 2 and Broken Silence | produced w/ DJ Clue? |
| 2001 | "Bathgate Freestyle" | Bathgate | The Professional 2 | produced w/ DJ Clue? |
| 2001 | "I Don't Care" | Capone-N-Noreaga | The Professional 2 | produced w/ DJ Clue? |
| 2001 | "Dangerous" | Lady Luck | The Professional 2 | produced w/ DJ Clue? |
| 2001 | "Phone Patch" | Ty Shaun | The Professional 2 | produced w/ DJ Clue? |
| 2001 | "Don't Stop (Funkin' 4 Jamaica)" | Mariah Carey, Mystikal | Glitter | produced w/ DJ Clue? & Mariah Carey |
| 2001 | "Last Night a D.J. Saved My Life" | Mariah Carey | Glitter | produced w/ DJ Clue? & Mariah Carey |
| 2001 | "Click & Spark" | Fabolous | Ghetto Fabolous | produced w/ DJ Clue? |
| 2001 | "Keepin' It Gangsta" | Fabolous | Ghetto Fabolous | produced w/ DJ Clue? |
| 2001 | "Ride for This" | Fabolous, Ja Rule | Ghetto Fabolous | produced w/ DJ Clue? |
| 2001 | "Trade It All" | Fabolous, Jagged Edge | Ghetto Fabolous | produced w/ DJ Clue? |
| 2001 | "Take You Home" | Fabolous, Lil' Mo | Ghetto Fabolous | produced w/ DJ Clue? |
| 2001 | "Gotta Be Thug" | Fabolous | Ghetto Fabolous | produced w/ DJ Clue? |
| 2001 | "If They Want It" | Fabolous | Ghetto Fabolous | produced w/ DJ Clue? |
| 2003 | "Up on Things" | Fabolous, Snoop Dogg | Street Dreams | produced w/ DJ Clue? |
| 2003 | "Into You" | Fabolous, Ashanti, Tamia | Street Dreams | produced w/ DJ Clue? |
| 2003 | "Throw Back" | Fabolous | Street Dreams | produced w/ DJ Clue? |
| 2003 | "Keepin It Gangsta (Remix)" | Fabolous, Styles P, Jadakiss, M.O.P., Paul Cain | Street Dreams | produced w/ DJ Clue? |
| 2003 | "Trade It All (Part 2)" | Fabolous, P. Diddy, Jagged Edge | Street Dreams | produced w/ DJ Clue? |
| 2020 | "Something Special" | Pop Smoke | Shoot for the Stars, Aim for the Moon | N/A |

- Ken "Duro" Ifill at Album Credits
- Ken "Duro" Ifill credits. AllMusic.
