= Complicated (Nivea album) =

Studio album by Nivea
- Released: May 3, 2005
- Recorded: 2003–2004
- Genre: R&B
- Length: 53:13
- Label: Jive
- Producers: Karl Antoine; Larry "Rock" Campbell; Bryan-Michael Cox; Deputy; The-Dream; Jermaine Dupri; R. Kelly; Nastacia "Nazz" Kendall; Lil Jon; P.I.M.P.; The Platinum Brothers

Nivea chronology
Nivea (2001)	Complicated (2005)	Animalistic (2006)

Singles from Complicated
- 1. "Okay" Released: October 19, 2004; 2. "Parking Lot" Released: May 3, 2005

Complicated is the second studio album by American singer Nivea, released in the United States on May 3, 2005 on Jive Records. It was primarily produced by her then-husband The-Dream, with additional production from Lil Jon, R. Kelly, Bryan Michael Cox and Jermaine Dupri. The album peaked at No. 37 on the US Billboard 200 album charts and peaked at No. 9 on the R&B chart. Complicated failed to receive major commercial success, eventually selling just over 100,000 copies in the US.

== Singles ==
"Okay", the album's lead single, was already recorded back in 2003. Though it was clear that the track was going to be released as a single, the record company kept it under closure to introduce the upcoming crunk&B style with newcomer Ciara and her "Goodies" track. The single became a hit, peaking at No. 40 on the Billboard Hot 100 and No. 14 on Hot R&B/Hip-Hop Songs.

A second single, "Parking Lot" was released shortly before she got pregnant with her first child. Jive Records subsequently dropped promotion for the project, although she appeared on Soul Train the following year and performed "Complicated" which was originally planned to be the third single. After her departure from the label, she gave birth to her twins in April.

== Critical reception ==
Professional ratings
Review scores
Source	Rating
AllMusic	3/5 stars
MTV Asia	5/10
Rap Reviews	4.5/10
Vibe	2.5/5 stars

Critics largely found Complicated inconsistent and unremarkable, citing predictable production and underwhelming guest contributions. AllMusic's Andy Kellman was not impressed with Complicated. He wrote that the album "contains a couple should-be successful singles, but it's far too patchy to be considered better than the debut. More sexually upfront and as sweet-voiced as ever, Nivea still needs more than a couple hot producers and guest MCs to truly stick out." Tom Doggett from Rap Reviews felt that "from start to finish, there is nothing terribly notable about Complicated [...] From here to the end, there are no great songs and only a couple of good ones. One of the biggest problems is that every song fits the blueprint for what one might expect from Nivea, with smooth and slightly edgy poppy rap production and vocals that never surprise."

Vibe critic Angie Romero found that the album saw Nivea falling "back on the usual tricks of the trade: cameos by Lil Jon and YoungBloodZ on "Okay"; a familiar sample on "I Can't Mess With You" (which borrows from Mary J. Blige's "Everything"); and a racier image. Although this shorty's soprano sounds older, raspier, and sexier, raunchy tracks like "Quickie" and "Gangsta Girl" (where R. Kelly re-enacts his tired flamenco bit), come up short." Angelina Yeo from MTV Asia criticized Complicated for lacking "sleek and sexy vibes," noting that it features a mix "of predictable, plastic, street-tough R&B jams with numerous guest performers." She concluded: "It's a pity that Nivea's vocals are not distinctive enough to set her apart from her female R&B; counterparts. Don't write her off though, for she is a decent singer at only 23 years of age. But she better find some good songs quick."

== Chart performance ==
Complicated debuted and peaked at number 37 on the US Billboard 200 in the week of May 21, 2005, with first week sales of 27,000 copies. It also debuted at number nine on the Top R&B/Hip-Hop Albums, becoming Nivea's first album to reach the top ten of the chart.

== Track listing ==
Complicated track lisiting
No.	Title	Writer(s)	Producer(s)	Length
1.	"Rain (Interlude)"	Nivea; Terius Nash	The-Dream	0:50
2.	"Complicated"	Nivea; Nash	The-Dream	3:52
3.	"Okay" (featuring Lil Jon and YoungBloodZ)	Nivea; Nash; Traci Hale; Jeffrey Grigsby; Sean Paul Joseph; Jonathan Smith	Lil Jon; The-Dream^{[B]}	4:43
4.	"Parking Lot"	Jermaine Dupri; Bryan Michael Cox; Johnta Austin	Dupri; Cox^{[C]}	3:51
5.	"Fulton County Correctional Call (Interlude)"	Nivea; Nash	The-Dream	1:08
6.	"I Can't Mess with You" (featuring The-Dream)	Nivea; Nash; Thomas Bell; Michael Chesser; Linda Creed; Adam Gibbs	The Platinum Brothers	4:02
7.	"Breathe (Let It Go)"	Nivea; Nash; Jamil Pierre	Deputy; Larry "Rock" Campbell^{[A]}; The-Dream^{[A]}	4:04
8.	"Quickie" (featuring Rasheeda)	Nivea; Chesser; Kenny Hickson; Esmond Edwards	The Platinum Brothers	4:04
9.	"Indian Dance"	Nivea; Nash	The-Dream	3:50
10.	"No More"	Nivea; Chesser; Gibbs	The Platinum Brothers	3:39
11.	"Gangsta Girl" (featuring R. Kelly)	R. Kelly	Kelly	2:56
12.	"Okay Remix (Red-Cup Version)" (featuring The-Dream)	Nivea; Nash; Smith; Hale	The-Dream	4:11
13.	"So Far"	Kendall; Chesser; Gibbs; Karl Antoine	The Platinum Brothers; Karl Antoine^{[A]}; Nastacia "Nazz" Kendall^{[A]}	4:02
14.	"It's All Good"	Nivea; Nash	The-Dream	3:37

Complicated – Japanese edition (bonus track)
No.	Title	Writer(s)	Producer(s)	Length
15.	"My Fault (Ghetto Apology)"	Nivea; Christopher Jasper; Larry Campbell; Marvin Isley; Rudolph Isley; O'Kelly Isley; Ronald Isley; Ernie Isley	P.I.M.P.	3:58

Notes

- ^{^[A]} denotes co-producer
- ^{^[B]} denotes vocal producer
- ^{^[C]} denotes additional producer

Sample credits

- "I Can't Mess with You" contains a sample of "You Are Everything" by The Stylistics.
- "My Fault (Ghetto Apology)" contains a sample of "For the Love of You" by The Isley Brothers.

== Personnel ==
Performers and musicians

- Fletcher Dozier Jr. – guitar
- Donnie Lyle – guitar
- Eddie E. Hamilton – guitar
- Julio Miranda – guitar

Technical

- Nivea Nash – executive producer
- Terius "The Dream" Nash – executive producer, producer
- Larry "Rock" Campbell – A&R, producer,
- Bryan Michael Cox – producer
- Jermaine Dupri – producer
- Lil Jon – producer
- R. Kelly – producer
- The Platinum Brothers – producer
- Nastacia "Nazz" Kendall – producer
- Vocal assistance: Sakinah Lestage
- Brian Frye – engineer
- Andy Gallas – engineer
- Abel Garibaldi – engineer
- Matthew Malpass – engineer
- Ian Mereness – engineer
- Ray Seay – engineer
- Rich Tapper – engineer
- Steve Bearsley – assistant engineer
- Josh Copp – assistant engineer
- Jason Mlodzinski – assistant engineer
- Keith Sengbusch – assistant engineer
- Rob Skipworth – assistant engineer
- Adam Smith – assistant engineer
- Nathan Wheeler – assistant engineer
- Leslie Braithwaite – mixing
- Kevin "KD" Davis – mixing
- John Frye – mixing
- Serban Ghenea – mixing
- Brian Stanley – mixing
- Phil Tan – mixing
- Warren Bletcher – mixing assistance
- Kris Lewis – mixing assistance
- Tom Coyne – mastering
- Wayne Williams – A&R
- Elisa Garcia – art direction
- Denise Trorman – art direction
- Jonathan Mannion – photography

== Charts ==
Weekly chart performance for Complicated
Chart (2005)	Peak position
Japanese Albums (Oricon)	18
US Billboard 200	37
US Top R&B/Hip-Hop Albums (Billboard)	9
