= Don't Mess with the Radio =

2001 single by Nivea

Single by Nivea

from the album Nivea
- Released: June 12, 2001
- Length: 3:58
- Label: Jive
- Songwriters: Cedric Barnett; Marqueze Etheridge; Ray Murray; Rico Wade; Jamahr Williams; Patrick Brown; Brandon Bennett
- Producers: Organized Noize; Swift C

Nivea singles chronology
"Danger (Been So Long)" (2000)	"Don't Mess with the Radio" (2001)	"Run Away (I Wanna Be with U)" (2001)

Music video
- "Don't Mess with the Radio" on YouTube

"Don't Mess with the Radio" is a song by American singer Nivea from her debut self-titled studio album (2001). It was written by Cedric Barnett, Marqueze Etheridge, Jamahr Williams, Brandon Bennett and Organized Noize members Ray Murray, Rico Wade, and Sleepy Brown, while production was helmed by Organized Noize and Swift C. It was selected as Nivea's solo debut single.

The song was released on June 12, 2001. While not a major hit in the United States or most other countries, it was a top-twenty success in Australia, reaching number 14 on the ARIA Singles Chart. In April 2002, the song was released in the United Kingdom as a double A-side with "Run Away (I Wanna Be with U)", peaking at number 48 on the UK Singles Chart.

== Track listings ==
Australian CD single
No.	Title	Producer(s)	Length
1.	"Don't Mess with the Radio" (Album Version)	Organized Noize; Swift C	3:57
2.	"Don't Mess with the Radio" (Terry's Radio House Mix)	Organized Noize; Swift C; Terry Hunter^{[a]}	3:19
3.	"Don't Mess with the Radio" (Terry's Don't Mess With the House Mix)	Organized Noize; Swift C; Hunter^{[a]}	7:10
4.	"Don't Mess with the Radio" (Afro Hijackers Radio Edit)	Organized Noize; Swift C; Sir Piers^{[a]}; Ed Funk^{[a]}	3:30

Remix single
No.	Title	Producer(s)	Length
1.	"Don't Mess with the Radio" (Irv Gotti Remix featuring Caddillac Tah)	Organized Noize; Swift C; Irv Gotti^{[a]}	3:13
2.	"Don't Mess with the Radio" (Allstar Remix featuring Petey Pablo)	Organized Noize; Swift C; Allstar^{[a]}	3:45
3.	"Don't Mess with the Radio" (Allstar Shout Out Version featuring Petey Pablo)	Organized Noize; Swift C; Allstar^{[a]}	3:45

Notes

- ^{^a} denotes additional producer

== Charts ==
=== Weekly charts ===
Chart (2001–2002)	Peak position
Australia (ARIA)	14
Germany (GfK)	43
Netherlands (Dutch Top 40 Tipparade)	9
Netherlands (Single Top 100)	83
Scotland Singles (OCC) with "Run Away (I Wanna Be with U)"	99
Sweden (Sverigetopplistan)	60
UK Singles (OCC) with "Run Away (I Wanna Be with U)"	48
UK Indie (OCC) with "Run Away (I Wanna Be with U)"	9
UK Hip Hop/R&B (OCC) with "Run Away (I Wanna Be with U)"	7
US Billboard Hot 100	90
US Hot R&B/Hip-Hop Songs (Billboard)	85
US Rhythmic Airplay (Billboard)	25

=== Year-end charts ===
Chart (2001)	Position
Australia (ARIA)	93

== Certifications ==
Region	Certification	Certified units/sales
Australia (ARIA)	Gold	35,000^{^}
^{^} Shipments figures based on certification alone.

== Release history ==
Region	Date	Format(s)	Label(s)	Ref.
United States	June 12, 2001	Urban radio	Jive	
United States	June 26, 2001	Rhythmic contemporary radio	Jive	
Australia	September 3, 2001	CD	Jive	
United States	September 4, 2001	Contemporary hit radio	Jive	
United Kingdom	April 22, 2002	12-inch vinyl; CD; cassette	Jive	
