= Danger (Been So Long) =

2000 song by Mystikal

Single by Mystikal featuring Nivea

from the album Let's Get Ready
- Released: December 12, 2000
- Length: 3:32
- Label: Jive
- Songwriters: Michael Tyler; Pharrell Williams; Charles Hugo
- Producer: The Neptunes

Mystikal singles chronology
"Shake Ya Ass" (2000)	"Danger (Been So Long)" (2000)	"Stutter" (2000)

Nivea singles chronology
"Danger (Been So Long)" (2000)	"Don't Mess with the Radio" (2001)

"Danger (Been So Long)" is the second single released by American rapper Mystikal from his fourth album, Let's Get Ready (2000), featuring American singer Nivea. The song was released on December 12, 2000, and was produced by the Neptunes. "Danger" was a success commercially, peaking at number 14 on the US Billboard Hot 100, number one on the Hot R&B/Hip-Hop Singles & Tracks chart, and number three on the Hot Rap Singles chart. "Danger (Been So Long)" was the second single from the album to reach the top 20 on the Hot 100, after "Shake Ya Ass".

"Danger" was used as part of a running gag on The Daily Show during John Oliver's tenure as interim host in 2013, and again on Oliver's own show Last Week Tonight in 2016, in reference to Anthony Weiner's scandalous mayoral campaign and his online pseudonym, "Carlos Danger".

== Track listings ==
US and UK 12-inch single

A1. "Danger (Been So Long)" (clean) – 3:35
A2. "Danger (Been So Long)" (instrumental) – 3:35
B1. "Danger (Been So Long)" (LP version) – 3:32
B2. "Danger (Been So Long)" ("Breathing" instrumental) – 3:35

UK and Australian CD single

1. "Danger (Been So Long)" (clean) – 3:35
2. "Danger (Been So Long)" (LP version) – 3:32
3. "Danger (Been So Long)" ("Breathing" instrumental) – 3:35

European CD single

1. "Danger (Been So Long)" (clean) – 3:35
2. "Danger (Been So Long)" (LP version) – 3:32

== Charts ==
=== Weekly charts ===
Chart (2001)	Peak position
Europe (Eurochart Hot 100)	83
Germany (GfK)	45
Netherlands (Dutch Top 40 Tipparade)	2
Netherlands (Single Top 100)	36
Scotland Singles (OCC)	55
Sweden (Sverigetopplistan)	40
Switzerland (Schweizer Hitparade)	60
UK Singles (OCC)	28
UK Dance (OCC)	6
UK Indie (OCC)	3
UK Hip Hop/R&B (OCC)	9
US Billboard Hot 100	14
US Hot R&B/Hip-Hop Songs (Billboard)	1
US Hot Rap Songs (Billboard)	3
US Rhythmic Airplay (Billboard)	8

=== Year-end charts ===
Chart (2001)	Position
UK Urban (Music Week)	18
US Billboard Hot 100	58
US Hot R&B/Hip-Hop Singles & Tracks (Billboard)	21
US Rhythmic Top 40 (Billboard)	30

== Release history ==
Region	Date	Format(s)	Label(s)	Ref.
United States	December 12, 2000	Urban contemporary radio	Jive	
United Kingdom	February 19, 2001	CD	Jive	
United States	March 13, 2001	Contemporary hit radio	Jive	
Australia	May 28, 2001	CD	Jive	
New Zealand	June 11, 2001	CD	Jive	
