= Shake Ya Ass =

Single by Mystikal

from the album Let's Get Ready
- B-side: "Shake It Fast"
- Released: 2000
- Studio: Master Sound (Virginia Beach, Virginia)
- Genre: Dirty rap
- Length: 4:20
- Label: Jive
- Songwriters: Michael Tyler; Pharrell Williams; Charles Hugo
- Producer: The Neptunes

Mystikal singles chronology
"Live or Die" (1999)	"Shake Ya Ass" (2000)	"Danger (Been So Long)" (2000)

"Shake Ya Ass", also known by its clean title "Shake It Fast", is a song by American rapper Mystikal, released in 2000 as the first single from his fourth album, Let's Get Ready. Produced by the Neptunes, the song features a hook performed by Pharrell Williams, who is uncredited on various releases of the song. It was Mystikal's biggest commercial success, peaking at number 13 on the Billboard Hot 100, number three on the Hot R&B/Hip-Hop Songs chart and number seven on the Hot Rap Singles chart. Both the song and music video (directed by Little X) received heavy radio airplay and it has become Mystikal's most popular song, along with its similarly successful follow-up, "Danger (Been So Long)"—which the Neptunes also produced.

== History ==
There were two edited versions of "Shake Ya Ass", allowing radio stations to choose between the two refrains but both versions had modified lyrics. Only the edited version of "Shake Ya Ass" was never released as opposed to "Shake It Fast" on the album's edited version.

In March 2002, Mystikal was sued by Steve Winn, the creator of the Cajun in Your Pocket keychain toy, who claimed that "Shake Ya Ass" bore many similarities to his product.

In an interview with RapGenius, Mystikal explained that he was reluctant to release the song as a single at first, stating that he felt that it did not adequately showcase his abilities as an artist. However, he stated that he was grateful it was released, saying that its success "proved me wrong" and that it was the "biggest song of my career".

== Music video ==
The music video for this song shows Mystikal being invited to a party by three Black women. He later goes to the house where this party is being held. As he enters the house, he notices a group of bikini-clad women wearing masks and shaking on the dance floor. One of the women leads him upstairs, removes her mask, and shows him she was one of the three women he had met earlier. Pharrell can also be seen singing and dancing with some of the women. The video vixens featured are Melyssa Ford, Tanisha Scott, and Maritza Murray.

== Legacy ==
The song was listed as the 303rd best song of the 2000s by Pitchfork Media.

== In popular culture ==
Since its release, the song has been featured in several films and other media. It has been featured in the films The Hot Chick, Zoolander, Crossroads, Down to Earth, Juwanna Mann, Scary Movie 2, Identity Thief, About a Boy and It's a Boy Girl Thing, as well as the HBO television series Treme and in the first-season episode "Everybody Hates Drew" of TV series Everybody Hates Chris. It also appeared in the 2008 video game Grand Theft Auto IV. In 2019, the song lyrics were read by former WCW commentator Tony Schiavone on his popular podcast What Happened When. This was a big success with the podcast audience and has led to Schiavone reading different rap songs every week. The song was subsequently remixed with Schiavone's initial version dubbed in over the music.

== Track listing ==
A-side

1. "Shake Ya Ass" (LP version) – 4:20
2. "Shake Ya Ass" (instrumental) – 4:39

B-side

1. "Shake Ya Ass" (clean radio edit) – 4:17
2. "Shake It Fast" (cleaner radio edit) – 4:16

== Charts ==
=== Weekly charts ===
Chart (2000–2001)	Peak position
Australia (ARIA)	62
Australian Urban (ARIA)	15
Germany (GfK)	87
Netherlands (Single Top 100)	66
Scotland Singles (OCC)	46
UK Singles (OCC)	30
UK Dance (OCC)	9
UK Hip Hop/R&B (OCC)	5
US Billboard Hot 100	13
US Hot R&B/Hip-Hop Songs (Billboard)	3
US Hot Rap Songs (Billboard)	7

=== Year-end charts ===
Chart (2000)	Position
US Billboard Hot 100	68
US Hot R&B/Hip-Hop Songs (Billboard)	20
