= Nivea (singer) =

American singer (born 1982)

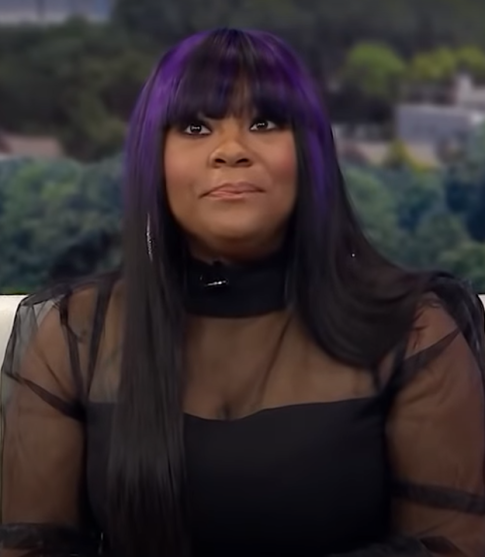
- Nivea in 2019
- Born: Nivea Beron Hamilton; March 24, 1982 (age 44); Atlanta, Georgia, U.S.
- Other name: Nivea Nash
- Occupations: Singer; songwriter; actress
- Years active: 2000–present
- Spouse: The-Dream (m. 2004; div. 2008)
- Partner: Lil Wayne (2002–2003; 2009–2010)
- Children: 4
- Musical career
- Genre: R&B
- Instrument: Vocals
- Labels: Jive; Zomba; Formula; One On One

Nivea Beron Hamilton (born March 24, 1982) is an American singer. She has released three studio albums: her self-titled debut (2002), followed up by Complicated (2005), Animalistic (2006), and an independently released extended play, Nivea: Undercover (2011). In 2019, she released her album Mirrors.

Her song "Don't Mess with My Man" was nominated for a Best R&B Performance Grammy in 2003.

== Early life ==
Hamilton was born on March 24, 1982, in Atlanta. She is the youngest of three sisters. She sang in a church choir and from there, admired Mariah Carey. She admitted to being shy in a 2019 interview with BET, saying "I never wanted anyone to hear me sing... my parents would turn down the radio [and I would automatically stop]."

== Career ==
=== 2000–2003: Nivea ===
In 2000, Nivea appeared on Jive Records labelmate, rapper Mystikal's hit single "Danger (Been So Long)" which garnered her some buzz. Following its success, she had signed with Jive and released her debut solo single "Don't Mess with the Radio" in 2001. It garnered moderate success, peaking at number 90 on the Billboard Hot 100 and number 85 on the Hot R&B Songs chart. Her label then decided to release her self-titled debut album internationally, due to high demand in the domestic area. Released firstly in Australia on September 25, 2001, the album would later be released in the United States on December 10, 2002, peaking at number 80 on the Billboard 200 and thirty-five on the Top R&B/Hip-Hop Albums chart, while topping the Heatseekers album chart. "Run Away (I Wanna Be with You)" (featuring Pusha T) was released as the album's next single in Japan on December 10, 2001.

On June 3, 2002, she released her second U.S. single, "Don't Mess with My Man" featuring brothers Brian and Brandon Casey (of R&B group Jagged Edge). The single was a big hit, peaking at number eight on the Hot 100 at number twenty-five on the Hot R&B/Hip-Hop Songs chart, respectively. The single's performance fueled album sales of her debut. The following year, "Don't Mess with My Man" was nominated for a Grammy Award for Best R&B Performance by a Duo or Group with Vocals.

The album's third U.S. single "Laundromat" (released in April 2003) featured singer, songwriter and producer R. Kelly. Due to Kelly's legal issues within that period (see R. Kelly child sexual abuse material case), he was unable to appear in the song's video, which instead starred comedian Nick Cannon, playing her love interest in the music video. The single became a minor hit for the singer, peaking at number twenty on the Hot R&B Songs chart and number 58 on the Hot 100.

=== 2004–2008: Complicated and Animalistic ===
Following the success of her first album, she began work on her second studio album, releasing a buzz single, "You Wanna Touch Me" featuring rapper and Love & Hip Hop: Atlanta reality star Rasheeda and singer Akon. It only charted at number 86 on the Hot R&B Songs chart. After meeting her future husband, Terius "The-Dream" Nash, they began dating and he soon handled the primary production on her forthcoming album.

In late 2004, she released the project's lead single, "Okay", which featured YoungbloodZ and its producer, Lil' Jon. The single became a hit, peaking at number fourteen on the Hot R&B Songs chart and number forty on the Billboard Hot 100.

On May 3, 2005, she released her second album Complicated, a week before she gave birth to her daughter. The album peaked at number nine on the R&B/Hip-Hop album chart and underperformed on the Billboard 200 at number thirty-seven, selling 27,000 copies in its first week. A second single, "Parking Lot" was released, shortly before she got pregnant. Jive Records subsequently dropped promotion for the project, although she appeared on Soul Train the following year and performed "Complicated", which was originally planned as the album's third single. Before it could materialize, Jive went into a new direction with its artist roster. In March 2006, Nivea parted ways with the label.

After her departure from Jive, she gave birth to her twins in April, a month after her severity from the imprint. That same year, she began work on her next studio album and signed a new contract with Formula Records. Primarily produced by her then-husband, The-Dream, her third album, Animalistic, was released on November 15, 2006, exclusively in Japan, led by the single, "Watch It", which garnered some airplay. However, she premiered new material on her MySpace profile such as "I Might", "Look Back" and "Zodiac", although they were never released officially. She later took a hiatus from the music industry to focus on raising her children following her divorce from The-Dream.

=== 2009–2014: Undercover and "Loud Blunt" ===
In 2010, she released a buzz single titled "Love Hurts" which featured her then-boyfriend, rapper Lil' Wayne as her love interest in the music video. Also that year, she appeared on a few mixtapes including Sir Will ("It Only Hurts Forever") and Rasheeda ("Surprise" and "Say Something Remix").

She later announced that she would release an acoustic EP titled Nivea: Undercover and premiered the set's first single, a cover of the Sade song "Love Is Stronger Than Pride" in early 2011. In September 2011, the EP was released independently. She also collaborated with George Reefah on the single "Bump", which received a music video.

In 2012, she announced work on her fourth studio album, tentatively titled Purple Heart, which was set for a May release. The following year, she renamed the album to Nivea Revealed and announced a new single "Loud Blunt", which was released in November 2013 on digital services.

=== 2015–2022: Mirrors, The Randy Watson Collection, collaborations and "Virginia" ===
In October 2015, Nivea revealed that she would be releasing two albums simultaneously through her own record label. One of the projects was originally titled The Randy Watson Collection, which would be an acoustic LP, with her father behind the production. According to the singer, Randy Watson will explore a love story between herself and two men, and is influenced by neo soul and pop. The second project will be titled Mirrors and will be an R&B album with urban undertones.

In early 2018, she announced she was working with Wash House Entertainment. She collaborated with Snypa on the song, "This Way", which was released in January. In April, she announced and premiered her new single "Circles" in Atlanta. In September, she was featured on the song "Dope New Gospel" on ex-boyfriend Lil Wayne's album Tha Carter V, which was released on September 28, 2018. The album debuted at number one on the Billboard 200. The following day, she released the single, "Circles".

On September 16, 2019, she was featured on the song, "Oh Oh", by rapper SugaCane. On September 26, 2019, she released her album, Mirrors, including the single, "Circles".

In 2021, Nivea appeared on the reality show BET Presents: The Encore alongside former girl group members Shamari Devoe (of Blaque), 702 sisters Irish & LeMisha Grinstead, Cherish twins Fallon & Felisha King, Pamela Long (of Total), Aubrey O'Day (of Danity Kane), and Kiely Williams (of 3LW & The Cheetah Girls).

On January 7, 2022, Nivea released a new single, "Virginia", her first new release in 2 years. Ken Hamm of Soulbounce.com reviewed "Virginia" stating, "Nivea’s plight shows us that maybe love just isn’t enough. Over sultry keys and guitar licks, Nivea sings about a man who makes her feel warm when the world feels so cold. However, this love thang is a situation ship, not a relationship; she’s wifey, but not the wife" while Amethyst Music News Magazine wrote "R&B veteran/singer/songwriter Nivea is back with a new single entitled, 'Virginia.' On the track, the singer displays the beautiful vocals that she’s known for singing."

=== 2022–present: Upcoming collaboration album and Queens Court ===
In mid-October 2022, she confirmed that she and singer Paula DeAnda are recording a collaborative album together; both singers have confirmed this on separate interviews in 2020. They claimed to have stayed in contact and planned to have a single set for a 2022 release.

In 2023, she appeared on the first season of the Peacock dating reality series, Queens Court, alongside Evelyn Lozada and Tamar Braxton.

== Personal life ==
Nivea was diagnosed with leukemia in 2026.

=== Relationships and children ===
In February 2002, Nivea started dating rapper Lil Wayne. On December 11, 2002, they became engaged. In her July 2003 interview with Sister to Sister magazine, Nivea spoke about her engagement and how Wayne proposed. "Wayne said, 'I got your Christmas present with me and you're gonna love it. It's gonna make you smile. He got down on his knee and he was like, 'I know I'm young, but I've been through enough relationships to know and understand the meaning of what love is.' He was just perfect. He told me that he wanted to spend the rest of his life with me and he loved me. It was snot and tears at the same time." She also spoke on her wishes to have a son with the rapper. "I want a little boy very much right now. Wayne's daughter is just wonderful. She's a beautiful little girl." In a 2021 interview with Kandi Burruss, Nivea revealed having suffered a miscarriage. Nivea credited Wayne as being her first love. She said that if they did not get married, that she would die a single woman. In August 2003, Lil Wayne called off their engagement. His song, "Something You Forgot", was about his relationship with Nivea.

Nivea married R&B singer, songwriter and producer Terius "The-Dream" Nash in December 2004. Their daughter was born on May 10, 2005, and their twin sons in April 2006. The-Dream filed for legal separation on December 10, 2007. On June 15, 2008, their divorce was finalized. Nash stated in an interview, "I decided to end it because I didn't want to take this person [Nivea] and treat them a certain way based on what I was changing into, based on being bitter." Nivea says The-Dream wanted the divorce, not she. "I'm lying, it's not. We're supposed to say that, but it's not true. It wasn't no mutual agreement, he wanted to do it, I didn't, but it's done. I'm dealing with it." The-Dream wrote much of his album, Love/Hate (2007), based on his relationship with Nivea. He credited her with inspiring more sincerity in his songwriting, "to open up that other side of it that connects with the everyday woman", as he told SOHH. "She has helped me a lot with that area." Dream's single, "I Love Your Girl" (2007), explained his relationship with Nivea and the love triangle between the duo and Lil Wayne.

After her divorce from The-Dream in 2007, Nivea reconciled with Wayne in early 2008. On June 9, 2009, it was rumored that Nivea and Lil Wayne were engaged and expecting a child together. On October 14, 2009, Lil Wayne confirmed that he and Nivea were expecting a son. Nivea gave birth to their son on November 30, 2009. In June 2010, with Lil Wayne incarcerated on a weapons charge, the pair broke off their engagement for the second time. They would later reunite in 2018 to record "Dope New Gospel" for Wayne's long-awaited album, Tha Carter V, and had since remained on good terms. Their son currently performs music under the alias, Lil Novi.

== Discography ==
- Nivea (2002)
- Complicated (2005)
- Animalistic (2006)
- Mirrors (2019)

== Filmography ==
- The Parkers (Season 4, episode 22) (2003)
