= Mystikal =

American rapper (born 1970)

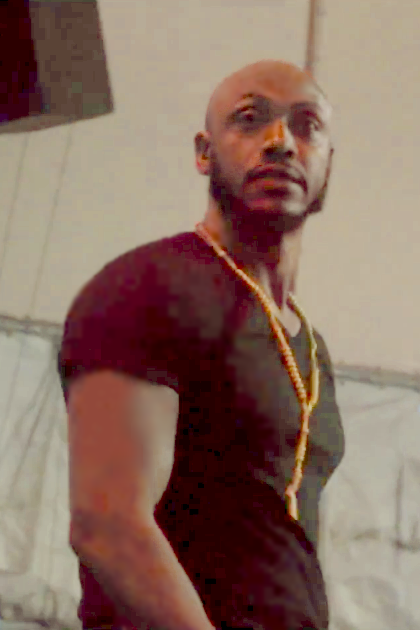
- Mystikal in 2016

Background information
- Also known as: G Money
- Born: Michael Lawrence Tyler; September 22, 1970 (age 56); New Orleans, Louisiana, U.S.
- Genre: Hip-hop
- Occupations: Rapper; songwriter; actor
- Years active: 1991–2004; 2010–2022
- Labels: Bigg Truck; Big Boy; No Limit; Jive; Cash Money; Universal Republic; Sony
- Formerly of: 504 Boyz

Michael Lawrence Tyler (born September 22, 1970), better known by his stage name Mystikal, is an American former rapper and actor from New Orleans, Louisiana. He is noted for his brash and explosive vocal delivery, characterized by a Southern rasp. He signed with the New Orleans-based record label Big Boy Records to release his self-titled debut studio album (1994), which was re-released by Jive Records the following year as his major label debut, Mind of Mystikal (1995). He then parted ways with the former label in favor of its local competitor, Master P's No Limit Records, through which he released his second and third albums, Unpredictable (1997) and Ghetto Fabulous (1998), and Goodfellas (1999) as a member of its flagship group, 504 Boyz.

Following his departure from No Limit, he remained signed in a joint venture with Jive Records. His 2000 singles, "Shake Ya Ass" (featuring Pharrell Williams) and "Danger (Been So Long)" (featuring Nivea), peaked at numbers 13 and 14 on the Billboard Hot 100, respectively. Both preceded the release of his fourth album, Let's Get Ready (2000), which debuted atop the Billboard 200; followed by Tarantula (2001).

His career ended in 2022 following his arrest and eventual conviction for rape charges.

== Early life and education ==
Tyler was born and raised in New Orleans, Louisiana's 12th Ward. His father, who ran a small neighborhood store, died when Tyler was seven. He attended Cohen High School and afterward joined the United States Army, where he served as a combat engineer during the Gulf War. Following his discharge from the United States Army, he began pursuing a career in rap while working several jobs to support himself. These included working at a New Orleans Woolworth, serving as an usher at the Caesars Superdome, and working at Stonebreakers.

== Career ==
=== 1994–1996: Early career and stint with Big Boy Records ===
As an aspiring rapper, he opened for Run-DMC and Doug E. Fresh at an outdoor concert at the Treme Center. Leroy "Precise" Edwards, the in-house producer for the Kenner, Louisiana-headquartered independent record label Big Boy Records, was in the audience, and granted him a contract with the label. Mystikal's debut album, Mystikal, was released on Big Boy in 1994. The album was one of Big Boy's most successful albums and gained major success for Mystikal. The album's success caught the attention of major record labels, which resulted in Mystikal signing to Jive Records later that year.

In 1995, he found himself involved in conflict with fellow New Orleans rappers signed to rival Cash Money, including U.N.L.V. and The B.G.'z. They dissed him on tracks like "Drag 'Em in Tha River" by U.N.L.V. and "Fuck Big Boy" by The B.G.'z. He struck back with "Beware" and "Here I Go" which were on his second album, Mind of Mystikal. Mystikal's sister, Michelle Tyler, sang the chorus on "Not That Nigga" and her fate became a major influence on Mystikal's music after her death in September 1994. The songs "Dedicated to Michelle Tyler", "Murder" (both on Mind of Mystikal), "Murder 2", "Shine" (both on Unpredictable) and "Murder III" (on Let's Get Ready) refer to her death. Mystikal and Lil Wayne would eventually squash their feud and become collaborators.

=== 1995–2000: Mind of Mystikal and stint with No Limit ===
In 1995, Mystikal signed to Jive and released Mind of Mystikal. In 1996, he signed to Master P's No Limit and released Unpredictable in November 1997. He appeared on many of the No Limit albums released from 1997 to 2000. He also collaborated with Mariah Carey on her Rainbow album on the track 'Did I Do That'. In late 1998, he released Ghetto Fabulous. That was his last album with the label. He and No Limit parted ways in July 2000 during the recording of Let's Get Ready.

=== 2000–2004: Let's Get Ready, Tarantula, guest features and prison ===
In 1999, he had begun recording his fourth album before leaving No Limit. Let's Get Ready was released in 2000 and contained "Danger (Been So Long)", which featured rising pop star Nivea, and was the Billboard Hot R&B/Hip-Hop Songs number-one single in June 2001. Let's Get Ready debuted at number one on the Billboard 200, making it Mystikal's only chart-topping album to date. The album also featured the popular, Neptunes-produced hit "Shake Ya Ass".

On September 11, 2001, Mystikal featured on Mariah Carey's song, "Don't Stop (Funkin' 4 Jamaica)", released the third single from the soundtrack Glitter. The song was composed by Carey, Mystikal, Duro and DJ Clue, and interpolates "Funkin' for Jamaica (N.Y.)" by Tom Browne. "Don't Stop (Funkin' 4 Jamaica)" did not reach the US Billboard Hot 100, but peaked inside of the Bubbling Under Hot 100, which acts as an extension of the former chart, peaking at number 123 on the week dated October 27, 2001. It also reached number 42 on the US Hot R&B/Hip-Hop Songs component chart. Worldwide, "Don't Stop (Funkin' 4 Jamaica)" was released as a double A-side with "Never Too Far". In the United Kingdom, the release reached a position of number 32. It also managed to reach peaks of numbers 36 and 16 in Australia and Spain, respectively.

The music video premiered on MTV's Total Request Live (TRL) on October 18, 2001. It is set in a nightclub with Mystikal on stage performing for an enthusiastic crowd, featuring southern bayous and various lifestyles.

Mystikal's most recent solo release was the 2001 album Tarantula, which contained the hit single, "Bouncin' Back (Bumpin' Me Against the Wall)". Though it presented Mystikal's typical and funky flow style, which had the distinction of drawing comparison to R&B soul singers Little Richard and James Brown, the song also saw a blending of jazz and swing elements with hip-hop. The well received album was nominated for a Grammy Award for Best Rap Album in 2003, and Mystikal was nominated for a Grammy Award for Best Male Rap Solo Performance that same year. Mystikal was also featured prominently in the single, "Move Bitch" by Ludacris as well as "I Don't Give a Fuck" by Lil Jon & The East Side Boyz along with Krayzie Bone, both in 2002. In 2003 he starred in the film 13 Dead Men.

=== 2010-2017 ===
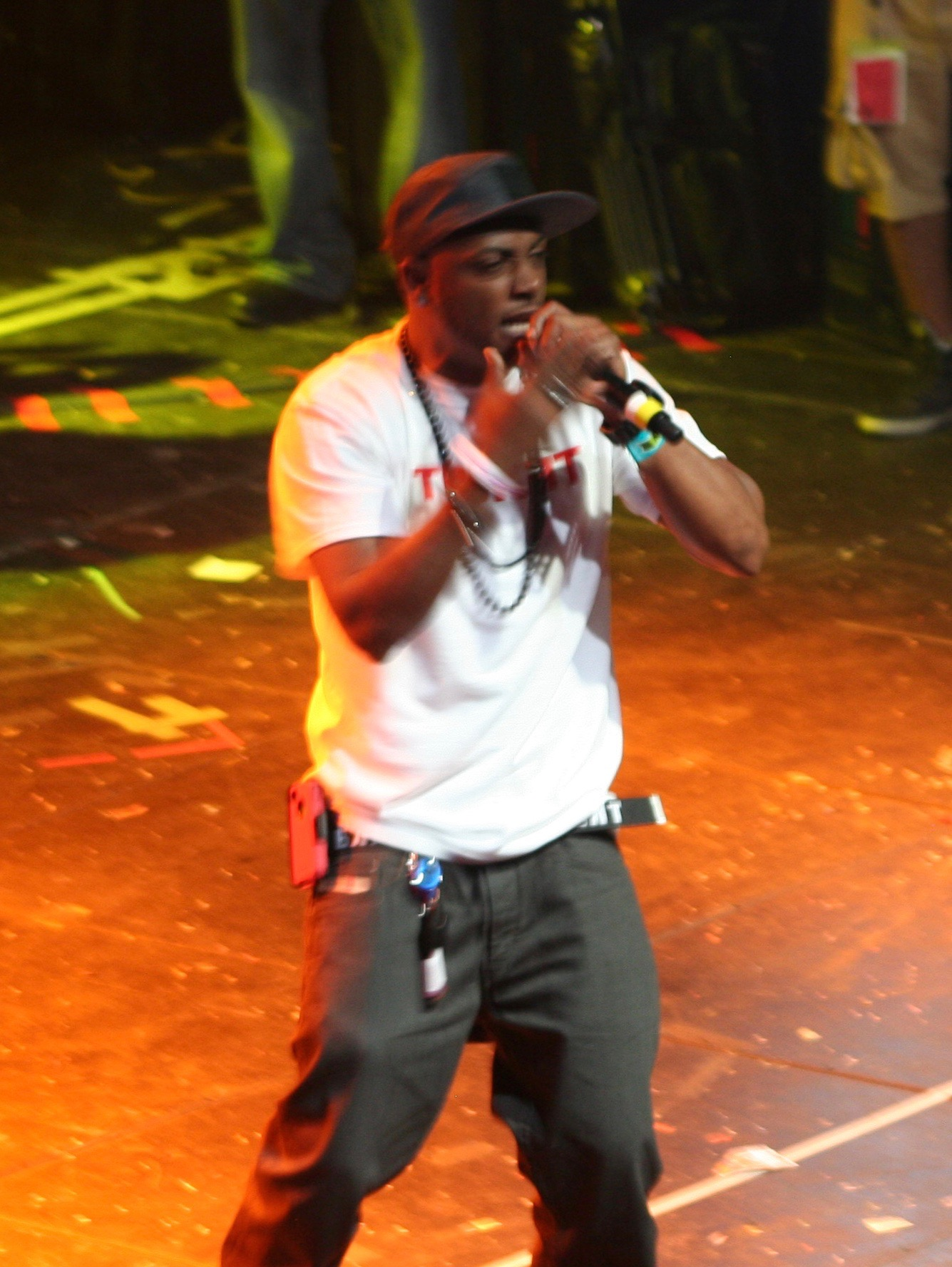
Mystikal performing in 2012

In February 2010, Mystikal headlined a concert at the Mahalia Jackson Theater of the Performing Arts on Mardi Gras. Mystikal's first song after being released from prison was an underground track with former No Limit labelmate Fiend entitled "I Don't Like You".

A few weeks later, Atlanta-based, New Orleans–born R&B artist Lloyd released "Set Me Free" featuring Mystikal. The music video for "Set Me Free" was released in May 2010, and was shot in New Orleans, primarily from the Calliope Projects.

In a May 2010 interview, he stated that he was still obligated to Jive Records for one more album and would be taking the necessary time to ensure the album would be his best to date. He made a promo song called "Papercuts" featuring Fiend and Lil Wayne. In 2011, he performed at the Gathering of the Juggalos. In November 2010, Mystikal and Busta Rhymes were signed to Cash Money Records by Birdman. His first single for the label, "Original", was released shortly thereafter and featured new label-mates Birdman and Lil Wayne.

In 2014, Mystikal guest performed on the single "Feel Right" for Mark Ronson's album Uptown Special. The song and video were released in 2015. Mystikal also appeared on Stevie Stone's single "Rain Dance" from the 2015 release Malta Bend.

In April 2016, Mystikal was featured on "Just a Lil' Thick (She Juicy)" by Trinidad James along with Lil Dicky.

In 2017, he was featured on "FYM" by Joyner Lucas, from his commercial mixtape 508-507-2209.

== Personal life ==
On his 24th birthday, Mystikal found his sister Michelle Tyler dead in her bedroom, having been stabbed and strangled. Her boyfriend at the time, Damion Neville, the grandson of a member of the Neville Brothers, was charged with murder. He was later acquitted due to a lack of evidence and a recanted confession.

=== Legal issues ===
On June 26, 2003, Mystikal pleaded guilty to sexual battery and extortion of his hairstylist. On January 15, 2004, Mystikal was sentenced to six years in state prison. The rapper and two bodyguards coerced the woman to perform oral sex, and accused her of stealing $80,000 in checks. As part of a plea bargain, all three pleaded guilty. Mystikal initially claimed that the incident was consensual. A videotape of the incident was later found at his home shortly after the charges were made. Negotiations during the trial held the videotape from being entered as evidence.

Mystikal agreed to the plea bargain offered by the prosecution, avoiding the mandatory life sentence for sexual battery in Louisiana and expecting to receive probation. The case took a twist when the judge viewed the videotape at the sentencing, took into account Mystikal's two prior arrests for drug and gun possession, and had him remanded into custody to begin serving a six-year sentence immediately. Mystikal's bodyguards, Leland Ellis and Vercy Carter, pleaded guilty to sexual battery.

In August 2005, while incarcerated on the state sexual battery and extortion charges, Mystikal was charged federally with two misdemeanor counts of failing to file tax returns for 1998 and 1999. On January 12, 2006, he was convicted in federal court of the tax offenses, but was allowed to serve the one-year federal sentence concurrent with his six-year state sentence. Mystikal was incarcerated at Louisiana's Elayn Hunt Correctional Center. On January 19, 2006, Mystikal was denied parole at a parole board hearing.

On January 11, 2007, Mystikal was released from custody on the federal misdemeanor tax convictions, as his one-year sentence had expired, but he remained in custody on the six-year sentence for the Louisiana state felony convictions. The news of his release caused confusion among fans who heard the news and mistakenly thought he had been released on parole. He was released January 14, 2010. After his release, Mystikal was registered as a sex offender for life.

On February 22, 2012, Mystikal was arrested again following a dispute with his domestic partner and was later given a misdemeanor charge of domestic abuse battery. He was detained for nine days and released on bail. On April 16, he was given a three-month jail sentence for violating the terms of his probation he was given following his release from prison in January 2010. He was given credit for the nine days already served, reducing his confinement to 81 days. He began serving his sentence on May 14 at the East Baton Rouge Parish Jail.

On August 21, 2017, Mystikal turned himself into the Caddo Parish Sheriff's Department after a warrant was issued for his arrest. He was charged with rape. He was held at the Caddo Correctional Center on a $3 million bond until February 14, 2019, when he was able to post bond. The charges were later dropped.

From August 2022 to June 2026, Mystikal was held without bond in Ascension Parish on rape and domestic abuse charges in relation to an incident wherein a woman accused him of beating, strangling, robbing, confining, and raping her after a financial dispute. On March 17, 2026, Tyler entered a guilty plea to rape charges. He faced a maximum of 20 years in prison, and the victim asked the judge to apply the maximum sentence. On June 16, 2026, he was sentenced to 20 years in prison.

== Discography ==
Studio albums

- Mystikal (1994)
- Mind of Mystikal (1995)
- Unpredictable (1997)
- Ghetto Fabulous (1998)
- Let's Get Ready (2000)
- Tarantula (2001)
