= Just Blaze production discography =

The following list is a discography of production by Just Blaze, an American hip hop record producer from Paterson, New Jersey. It includes a list of songs produced, co-produced and remixed by year, artist, album and title.

== 1999 ==
=== Harlem World - The Movement ===
- 05. "I Really Like It" (featuring Mase & Kelly Price) (co-produced by Supa Sam & Mase)
- 14. "Family Crisis" (co-produced by Supa Sam & Mase)

=== Buckshot - The BDI Thug ===
- 09. "Heavy Weighters" (featuring Swan & F.T.)

=== F.T. - New York State of Rhyme ===
- 04. "F-AVA" (featuring AVA)

== 2000 ==
=== Beanie Sigel - The Truth ===
- 02. "Who Want What" (featuring Memphis Bleek)

=== Killah Priest - View From Masada ===
- 02. "View from Masada"
- 03. "Hard Times"
- 06. "Gotta Eat"

=== Big Pun - Yeeeah Baby ===
- 03. "Off wit His Head" (featuring Prospect)
- 11. "Wrong Ones" (featuring Sunkiss)

=== Half-A-Mill - Milíon ===
- 08. "Fires in Hell"
- 13. "Thug Luv"

=== Prodigy - H.N.I.C. ===
- 19. "Diamond" (featuring Bars & Hooks)

=== Mad Lion - Predatah or Prey ===
- 03. "Battle Kat Anthem"
- 05. "Weed is all we need"
- 09. "Rule the World"
- 10. "Thrill Ada Hunt"
- 13. "Give it to me"
- 16. "Go to War"

=== Amil - All Money Is Legal ===
- 05. "Heard It All" (featuring Jay-Z)
- 09. "That's Right" (featuring Jay-Z) (co-produced by L.R)

=== Busta Rhymes - Anarchy ===
- 06. "Street Shit"
- 15. "Here We Go Again" (featuring Flipmode Squad)

=== Jay-Z - The Dynasty: Roc La Familia ===
- 01. "Intro"
- 04. "Streets Is Talking" (featuring Beanie Sigel)
- 07. "Stick 2 the Script" (featuring Beanie Sigel)
- 13. "The R.O.C." (featuring Beanie Sigel & Memphis Bleek)
- 14. "Soon You'll Understand"

=== Memphis Bleek - The Understanding ===
- 01. "Intro - U Know Bleek"
- 04. "We Get Low"
- 11. "They'll Never Play Me"

== 2001 ==
=== DJ Clue - The Professional 2 ===
- 18. "M.A.R.C.Y." (featuring Memphis Bleek & Geda K)

=== Beanie Sigel - The Reason ===
- 02. "Beanie (Mack B**ch)"
- 03. "So What You Saying " (featuring Memphis Bleek)
- 04. "Get Down"
- 12. "Mom Praying" (featuring Scarface)
- 13. "Still Got Love for You" (featuring Jay-Z & Rell)
- 14. "What Your Life Like 2"

=== Tragedy Khadafi - Against All Odds ===
- 02. "Against All Odds"

=== Jadakiss - Kiss tha Game Goodbye ===
- 16. "It's Time I See You" (featuring Cross, Drag-On, Eve, Infa-Red, Sheek, & Styles P)

=== Jay-Z - The Blueprint ===
- 04. "Girls, Girls, Girls"
- 06. "U Don't Know"
- 10. "Song Cry"
- 14. "Breathe Easy (Lyrical Exercise)" (Bonus Track)

=== Fabolous - Ghetto Fabolous ===
- 12. "Ma' Be Easy"

=== DMX - The Great Depression ===
- 13. "I'ma Bang"

=== Busta Rhymes - Genesis ===
- 02. "Everybody Rise Again"
- 07. "We Got What You Want"
- 19. "Match the Name with the Voice" (featuring Flipmode Squad)

== 2002 ==
=== State Property - State Property Soundtrack ===
- 01. Roc the Mic - Beanie Sigel & Freeway
- 03. It's Not Right - Beanie Sigel, Young Chris & Omillio Sparks
- 07. Bitch Niggas - Beanie Sigel & Omillio Sparks
- 13. Don't Realize - Beanie Sigel & Rell

=== Cam'ron - Come Home with Me ===
- 02. "Losing Weight pt. 2" (featuring Juelz Santana)
- 03. "Oh Boy" (featuring Juelz Santana)
- 07. "Welcome to New York City" (featuring Jay-Z & Juelz Santana)
- 13. "The Roc (Just Fire)" [featuring Memphis Bleek & Beanie Sigel]

=== Beenie Man - Feel It Boy (Single) ===
- 00. "Feel It Boy" (featuring Janet Jackson) [Just Blaze Remix]

=== Nelly - Nellyville ===
- 13. "Roc the Mic (Remix)" [feat. Freeway, Beanie Sigel & Murphy Lee]

=== Various Artist - Like Mike (Soundtrack) ===
- 06. "Playin' the Game" - Bow Wow

=== Snoop Dogg - Paid tha Cost to Be da Boss ===
- 06. "Lollipop" (featuring Jay-Z, Soopafly & Nate Dogg)

=== Trina - Diamond Princess ===
- 11. "How We Do" (featuring Fabolous)

=== Mario - C'mon (Single) ===
- 00. "C'mon (Just Blaze Remix)"

=== Various Artist - Paid In Full Soundtrack ===
- 06. "Don't You Know" - Jay-Z
- 11. "Alright" - Allen Anthony {also on Philadelphia Freeway}
- 13. "I Am Dame Dash" - Dame Dash, Jim Jones & Cam'ron

=== Jay-Z - The Blueprint^{2}: The Gift & the Curse ===
The Gift:

- 02. "Hovi Baby"

The Curse:

- 03. "U Don't Know (Remix)" (featuring M.O.P.)
- 04. "Meet the Parents"
- 05. "Some How Some Way" (featuring Beanie Sigel & Scarface)
- 10. "As One" (featuring Memphis Bleek, Beanie Sigel, Freeway, Young Gunz, Peedi Crakk, Omillio Sparks, & Rell)
- 12. "Show You How" (Bonus Track)
- 13. "Bitches & Sisters" (Bonus Track)

=== Erick Sermon - React ===
- 03. "We Don't Care" (featuring Free)
- 05. "React" (featuring Redman)

=== Mariah Carey - Charmbracelet ===
- 02. "Boy (I Need You)" [featuring Cam'ron]
- 05. "You Got Me" (featuring Freeway & Jay-Z) {also on Philadelphia Freeway}
- 15. "Through The Rain (Remix)" [featuring Joe & Kelly Price]

=== Mariah Carey - Boy (I Need You) - CDS1 ===
- 02. "Boy (I Need You) [Remix]" {featuring Diplomats & Freeway}

=== Shaggy - Hey Sexy Lady (Single) ===
- 00. "Hey Sexy Lady (Just Blaze Remix)" [featuring Brian & Tony Gold]

== 2003 ==
=== The Diplomats - Diplomatic Immunity ===
Disc 2:

- 01. "I Really Mean It"
- 11. "Built This City"

=== Freeway - Philadelphia Freeway ===
- 01. "Free"
- 02. "What We Do" (featuring Jay-Z & Beanie Sigel)
- 04. "Flipside" (featuring Peedi Crakk)
- 05. "On My Own" (featuring Nelly)
- 06. "We Get Around" (featuring Snoop Dogg)
- 07. "Don't Cross the Line" (featuring Faith Evans)
- 09. "Full Effect" (featuring Young Gunz)
- 13. "Alright" (featuring Allen Anthony)
- 16. "Line 'Em Up" (featuring Young Chris) (Bonus Track)

=== Fabolous - Street Dreams ===
- 05. "Can't Let You Go" (featuring Lil' Mo & Mike Shorey)

=== Various Artists - NBA Live 2003 OST ===
- 05. "Let's Go - Freeway, Memphis Bleek & Just Blaze
- 12. "Here We Go" - Flipmode Squad

=== Joe Budden - Joe Budden ===
- 03. "Pump It Up"
- 09. "Fire" (featuring Busta Rhymes)
- 13. "Give Me a Reason"

=== Nick Cannon - Nick Cannon ===
- 01. "Get Crunk Shorty" (featuring Ying Yang Twins & Fatman Scoop)

=== Jay-Z - The Black Album ===
- 01. "Interlude"
- 02. "December 4th"
- 10. "Public Service Announcement (Interlude)"

=== Keith Murray - He's Keith Murray ===
- 04. "Yeah Yeah U Know It" (featuring Def Squad)

=== "Love Don't Cost a Thing" Original Soundtrack ===
- 01. "Shorty (Put It on the Floor)" - Busta Rhymes, Chingy, Fat Joe & Nick Cannon

=== Memphis Bleek - M.A.D.E. ===
- 02. "Everythings a Go" (featuring Jay-Z)
- 03. "Round Here" (featuring Trick Daddy & T.I.)
- 04. "Just Blaze, Bleek & Free" (featuring Freeway)
- 06. "Hypnotic" (featuring Jay-Z & Beanie Sigel)
- 08. "War"
- 12. "Hell No"
- 17. "R.O.C."

== 2004 ==
=== Carl Thomas - Let's Talk About It ===
- 03. "My First Love"

=== Young Gunz - Tough Luv ===
- 04. "Friday Night"
- 07. "Tough Luv" (featuring Denim)

=== Janet Jackson - [released only on] Japan 12" ===
- 00. "Love Me" (Just Blaze Remix) (Alternate version of "Just a Little While")

=== Shyne - Godfather Buried Alive ===
- 12. "Here with Me"
- 13. "Diamonds & Mac 10's"

=== Usher - Confessions ===
- 03. "Throwback" (featuring Jadakiss)

=== Triple Seis - Only Time'll Tell ===
- 14. "Skully" (with 24K and Mashonda)

=== Shawnna - Worth tha Weight ===
- 02. "Let's Go"

=== Talib Kweli - The Beautiful Struggle ===
- 12. "Never Been in Love"

=== Jon B. - Stronger Everyday ===
- 01. "Everytime" (featuring Dirt McGirt)
- 16. "Everytime (Remix)" (featuring Beenie Man & Farena)

=== Jin - The Rest Is History ===
- 04. "Club Song"

=== Rah Digga - Everything Is a Story (Unreleased) ===
- 08. "Party and Bullshit 2003"
- 10. "Street People" (featuring Young Zee & Joe Budden)
- 20. "Party and Bullshit 2003 (Remix)" (featuring The Notorious B.I.G.) [Bonus Track]
- 21. "Party and Bullshit 2003 (Remix)" (featuring Missy Elliott & Eve) [Bonus Track]

=== Fabolous - Real Talk ===
- 12. "It's All Right" (featuring Sean Paul)
- 13. "Breathe"

=== Memphis Bleek - (Unreleased) ===
- 00. "Yes" (featuring Jay-Z)

=== Lenny Kravitz - 12" ===
- 00. "Storm [Just Blaze Remix]" (featuring Jay-Z)

== 2005 ==
=== Fat Joe - All or Nothing ===
- 03. "Safe 2 Say (The Incredible)"

=== The Game - The Documentary ===
- 08. "Church for Thugs"
- 13. "No More Fun and Games"

=== Beanie Sigel - The B. Coming ===
- 09. "Bread and Butter" (featuring Sadat X & Grand Puba)

=== Memphis Bleek - 534 ===
- 01. "534"
- 02. "Interlude"
- 03. "Dear Summer" (featuring Jay-Z)
- 14. "Straight Path"

=== M.E.D. - Push Comes to Shove ===
- 15. "Get Back"

=== Kanye West - Late Registration ===
- 03. "Touch the Sky" (featuring Lupe Fiasco)

=== Busta Rhymes - The Big Bang ===
- 00. "Get Flat" (featuring Butch Cassidy) ~~(Unreleased)~~

=== Notorious B.I.G. - Duets: The Final Chapter ===
- 10. "Livin' in Pain" (featuring Mary J. Blige, 2Pac & Nas)

== 2006 ==
=== LeToya - LeToya ===
- 02. "U Got What I Need"

=== Ghostface Killah - Fishscale ===
- 04. "The Champ"

=== T.I. - King ===
- 01. "King Back"
- 04. "I'm Talkin' to You"

=== Governor - Son of Pain ===
- 08. "You Got the Power" (featuring T.I.)

=== Rhymefest - Blue Collar ===
- 02. "Dynomite (Going Postal)"

=== Diddy - Press Play ===
- 07. "Tell Me" (featuring Christina Aguilera)

=== The Game - Doctor's Advocate ===
- 05. "Remedy"
- 16. "Why You Hate the Game" (featuring Nas & Marsha Ambrosius)

=== Jay-Z - Kingdom Come ===
- 02. "Oh My God"
- 03. "Kingdom Come"
- 04. "Show Me What You Got"

=== Capone - Menace 2 Society ===
- 03. "Troublesome (La, La, La)" (featuring Noreaga)

=== Teriyaki Boyz - "Beef or Chicken" ===
- 09. "今夜はバギーパンツ" [Kon-ya wa Baggy Pants] (Tonight is Baggy Pants)"

=== Cory Gunz - (Unreleased) ===
- "I Gotcha" (featuring Lil Wayne)

== 2007 ==
=== Juelz Santana - Nike ===
- 00. "The Second Coming" (featuring Just Blaze)

=== Daddy Yankee - El Cartel: The Big Boss ===
- 12. "Papi Lover" (featuring Nicole Scherzinger) (co-produced with Echo & Diesel)

=== Fabolous - From Nothin' to Somethin' ===
- 06. "Return of the Hustle" (featuring Swizz Beatz)

=== T.I. - T.I. vs T.I.P. ===
- 01. "Act I (T.I.P.)" (co-produced with T.I. & Caviar)
- 08. "Act II (T.I.)" (co-produced with T.I. & Caviar)
- 09. "Help Is Coming"
- 15. "Act III (T.I. vs T.I.P.)" (co-produced with T.I. & Caviar)

=== Talib Kweli - Eardrum ===
- 03. "Hostile Gospel Pt. 1 (Deliver Us)"

=== Jay-Z - American Gangster ===
- 10. "Ignorant Shit" (featuring Beanie Sigel)
- 15. "American Gangster" (Bonus Track)

== 2008 ==
=== Common - Smirnoff Signature Mix Series 12" ===
- A2. "The Light '08" (featuring Marsha Ambrosius)

=== Rakim - The Archive: Live, Lost & Found ===
- 04. "It's Nothing"

=== The Game - L.A.X. ===
- 00. "Superman" (Leftover track)

=== T.I. - Paper Trail ===
- 05. "Live Your Life" (featuring Rihanna)

=== Jay Electronica - Fresh Cuts Vol. 3 (Music By Guitar Center Employees) (Guitar Center compilation) ===
- 00. "Exhibit A (Transformations)"

=== Maroon 5 - Call and Response: The Remix Album ===
- 04. "Makes Me Wonder (Just Blaze Remix)"

=== Jamie Foxx - Intuition ===
- 03. "Number One" (featuring Lil Wayne)

== 2009 ==
=== Maino - If Tomorrow Comes ===
- 07. "All the Above" (featuring T-Pain) (co-produced with Nard & B)

=== Fabolous - Loso's Way ===
- 14. "Lullaby" (Produced by The Alchemist, scratches by Just Blaze)

=== Skyzoo - The Salvation ===
- 02. "Return of the Real"

=== Saigon - Warning Shots 2 ===
- 13. "Who Can Get Busy" (featuring Grand Puba)
- 15. "Gotta Believe It" (featuring Just Blaze)

=== Sha Stimuli - My Soul to Keep ===
- 06. "Move Back" (featuring Freeway)

== 2010 ==
=== Trey Songz - (Unreleased) ===
- "For the Sake of Love"

=== Eminem - Recovery ===
- 01. "Cold Wind Blows"
- 09. "No Love" (featuring Lil' Wayne)
- 16. "You're Never Over"
- 19. "Session One" (featuring Slaughterhouse) (iTunes Bonus Track)
- 00. "Fly Away (featuring Just Blaze) (Leftover track)
- 00. "I'm Sorry/Seasons" (Leftover track)

=== Capone-N-Noreaga - The War Report 2: Report the War ===
- 00. "T.O.N.Y Pt. 2" (Leftover track)

=== Fat Joe - The Darkside Vol. 1 ===
- 03. "I Am Crack"

=== The Game - The Red Room ===
- 14. "Maad Maxx Freestyle"
- 00. "400 Bars" (featuring DJ Drama)

=== Joe Budden - Mood Muzik 4: A Turn 4 the Worst ===
- 16. "Stuck in the Moment"

=== MosEL - Just Thinking Out Loud ===
- 4. "Vent"

== 2011 ==
=== The Game - Purp & Patron: The Hangover ===
- 15. "Undefeated" (featuring Busta Rhymes & Marsha Ambrosious)

=== Saigon - The Greatest Story Never Told ===
- 01. "Station Identification (Intro)" (featuring Fatman Scoop)
- 02. "The Invitation" (featuring Q-Tip & Fatman Scoop)
- 03. "C'mon Baby (Remix)" (featuring Swizz Beatz & Jay-Z)
- 04. "War"
- 05. "Bring Me Down, Part 2"
- 06. "Enemies" (Additional production)
- 07. "Friends"
- 08. "The Greatest Story Never Told"
- 09. "Clap" (featuring Faith Evans)
- 10. "Preacher" (featuring Lee Fields & The Expressions)
- 12. "Believe It"
- 13. "Give It to Me" (featuring Raheem DeVaughn) (Additional production)
- 14. "What the Lovers Do" (featuring Devin The Dude) (Additional production)
- 15. "Better Way" (featuring Layzie Bone)
- 16. "Oh Yeah (Our Babies)" (Additional production)
- 17. "And the Winner Is..." (featuring Bun B)

=== Joell Ortiz - Free Agent ===
- 07. "Battle Cry" (co-produced by Audible Doctor)

=== Marsha Ambrosius - Late Nights & Early Mornings ===
- 05. "Far Away"

=== Mac Miller - Best Day Ever ===
- 08. "All Around the World"

=== XV - Zero Heroes ===
- 01. "Wichita"

=== Maybach Music Group - Self Made Vol. 1 ===
- 01. "Self Made"

=== Drake - Take Care ===
- 10. "Lord Knows" (featuring Rick Ross)

== 2012 ==
=== The Game - California Republic ===
- 02. "Red Bottom Boss" (featuring Rick Ross)

=== T.I. - Fuck Da City Up ===
- 17. "Oh Yeah" (featuring Trey Songz)

=== OnCue - N/A ===
- 00. "New Religion" (co-produced by Party Supplies)

=== Kendrick Lamar - good kid, m.A.A.d city ===
- 12. "Compton" (featuring Dr. Dre)

=== Saigon - The Greatest Story Never Told Chapter 2: Bread And Circuses ===
- 01. "Plant the Seed (What U Paid For)" (Additional production)
- 02. "Rap vs. Real"

=== Freeway - Diamond In the Ruff ===
- 07. "Early"

=== Captain Murphy - "Duality" ===
- 04. "The Ritual"

=== Jon Connor - The People's Rapper LP ===
[jacked from Eminem]

- 01. "Cold Wind Blows"
- 18. "No Love"

=== Madonna - "MDNA (Nightlife Edition)" ===
- 09. "Give Me All Your Luvin' (Just Blaze Bionic Dub)"

== 2013 ==
=== Wale - The Gifted ===
- 14. "88" (produced with Tone P)

=== Tony Touch - The Piece Maker 3: Return of the 50 MCs ===
- 22. "Slaughter Session" (featuring Joell Ortiz, Royce da 5'9" & Crooked I)

=== Just Blaze and Baauer - N/A ===
- 00. "Higher" (featuring Jay-Z)

=== Slaughterhouse - ===
- 00. "Party" (co-produced by Cardiak)

== 2014 ==
=== Various Artists - Shady XV ===
- 02. "Psychopath Killer" - Slaughterhouse, Eminem, & Yelawolf (co-produced by Boi-1da)

=== OnCue - Angry Young Man ===
- 02. "Don't Forget Your Coat" (co-produced by CJ Luzi)
- 03. "So Much Love" (co-produced by Hudson Mohawke)
- 05. "Running" (co-produced by CJ Luzi)
- 06. "No Way" (co-produced by Maki, Brenton Duvall & Royal)
- 08. "Every Last Dollar" (co-produced by Terence Ryan)
- 09. "Way Too Far" (co-produced by Maki & Frequency)
- 11. "A Rolling Stone" (co-produced by manicanparty)
- 12. "This View From Here" (co-produced by Maki & Nicky Finest)

== 2015 ==
=== Ludacris - Ludaversal ===
- 14. "This Has Been My World"

=== Various Artists - Southpaw (Music from and Inspired By the Motion Picture) ===
- 07. "R.N.S." - Slaughterhouse {produced with AraabMuzik}

=== Run The Jewels - Meow The Jewels ===
- 02. "OH MY DARLING DON'T MEOW" (remix)

=== Jadakiss - Top 5 Dead or Alive ===
- 09. "Synergy" (featuring Styles P)

== 2016 ==
=== Beyoncé - Lemonade ===
- 10. "Freedom" (featuring Kendrick Lamar) (produced with Jonny Coffer & Beyoncé)

=== Snoop Dogg - Coolaid ===
- 04. "Super Crip"
- 20. "Revolution" (featuring October London)

=== Termanology - More Politics ===
- 01. "Just Politics"

== 2017 ==
=== Hall N' Nash (Westside Gunn & Conway) - N/A ===
- 00. "MachineGun Black"

=== Faith Evans & The Notorious B.I.G. - The King & I ===
- 08. "The Reason"
- 20. "Take Me There" (featuring Sheek Louch & Styles P)

=== Eminem - Revival ===
- 09. "Like Home" (featuring Alicia Keys)

=== Sha Stimuli - N/A ===
- "New Jordan’s"

== 2018 ==
=== Various Artists - Rapture (Music from the Netflix Original TV Series) - EP ===
- 01. "Let Me Work" - G-Eazy

=== T.I. - Dime Trap ===
- 02. "Laugh at Em" (co-produced by Cardiak)

=== Cam'ron - The Program ===
- 14. "Kiss Myself"

== 2019 ==
=== Various Artists - The Lion King: The Gift ===
- 12. "Mood 4 Eva" - Beyoncé, Jay-Z & Childish Gambino (produced with Beyoncé, DJ Khaled & Danja)

=== Rick Ross - Port of Miami 2 ===
- 06. "Big Tyme" (featuring Swizz Beatz)

== 2020 ==
=== Westside Gunn - Who Made the Sunshine ===
- 11. "98 Sabers" (featuring Armani Caesar, Conway The Machine and Benny The Butcher)

== 2021 ==
=== Vic Mensa - I TAPE ===
- 2. "VICTORY" (featuring DJ Pharris)

=== Various Artists - Space Jam: A New Legacy ===
- 1. "We Win" - Lil Baby & Kirk Franklin

== 2023 ==
=== T.I. - Kill the King ===
- 00. TBA (featuring Nas, Jay-Z, Ludacris)
- 00. TBA

=== Benny the Butcher - TBA ===
- 00. TBA

== Unsorted ==
=== The 701 Squad ===
- "Black Mask (We're Taking It All)"

=== Angie Martinez ===
- "Take You Home (Just Blaze Remix)" (featuring Fabolous & Kelis)

=== Beanie Sigel ===
- "Get Down (Remix)" (featuring Freeway, Clinton Sparks & Young Gunz)

=== Beastie Boys ===
- "Ch-Check It Out (Just Blaze Remix)"

=== Beenie Man ===
- "Feel It Boy" (featuring Janet Jackson) (Just Blaze Remix)

=== Bow Wow ===
- "Play The Game"

=== Capone-N-Noreaga ===
- "My Alias"

=== Chingy ===
- "I Must Be Dreaming (featuring JoJo)

=== Chris Brown ===
- "Real Throwback" (featuring Fabolous)

=== Cory Gunz ===
- "I Gotcha" (featuring Lil Wayne)

=== Diddy ===
- "Get Off"

=== DJ Drama ===
- "Million Dollar Baby" (featuring Lil Wayne)

=== DJ Green Lantern ===
- "Impeach The President" (featuring Dead Prez, Immortal Technique & Saigon)

=== Edison Chen ===
- "Act Like You Know"

=== Erick Sermon ===
- "Guns Out In A Circle"

=== Eve ===
- "Let Go (Hit The Dance Floor)" (featuring Jadakiss)

=== Faith Evans ===
- "Burnin' Up (Just Burnin' Remix)" featuring Diddy & Freeway

=== Foxy Brown ===
- "Art of War"

=== Freck Billionaire ===
- "Break You Off (featuring Fabolous)
- "In The Streets"

=== Freeway ===
- "Shootout"
- "Flipside pt. 2" (featuring Peedi Crakk)

=== Funkmaster Flex ===
- "We Are" (featuring Memphis Bleek & Geda K)

=== Janet Jackson ===
- "Love Me" (Just Blaze Remix) (Alternate version of "Just a Little While")
- "Love Me" (Just Blaze Remix featuring Naledge)

=== Jay Electronica ===
- "Exhibit A (Transformation)"
- "Exhibit C"

=== Jay-Z ===
- "Flow"
- "99 Problems (Just Blaze Remix)"
- "Moment of Clarity (Just Blaze Remix)"
- "Allure (Just Blaze Remix)"
- "Warm It Up Jay Freestyle"
- "Public Service Announcement (Part 2)"
- "Ignorant Shit (Original Version)"
- "Reminder (Just Blaze Remix)"

=== Joe Budden ===
- "Pop Off"
- "Fuel"

=== Kanye West ===
- "Touch The Sky (Remix)" (featuring D-Block)
- "Overrreact" (featuring Consequence)
- "What Else" (featuring AZ)

=== Kid Cudi ===
- "Not I Alone" (featuring Snoop Dogg)

=== Killah Priest ===
- "Fall Of Solomon"
- "Last Supper"

=== Lil Wayne ===
- "Million Dollar Baby"

=== MF Doom ===
- "Kookies (Just Blaze Remix)"

=== Mos Def ===
- "Holiday"

=== Naledge ===
- "My Country" (featuring Cornel West & Assata Shakur)

=== Nas ===
- "The Scientist (featuring Jay-Z)"

=== Nat King Cole ===
- "Pick Up"

=== N.O.R.E. ===
- Niggarican (featuring Peedi Crakk)

=== Rhymefest ===
- "Touch & Go"

=== Royce da 5'9" ===
- "What We Do"
- "King of Detroit" - Build & Destroy

=== S-Word ===
- "World Summit"

=== Shaggy ===
- "Hey Sexy Lady (Put It On Me Just Blaze Remix)" (featuring Brian & Tony Gold)

=== Swizz Beatz ===
- "Ride Or Die" (featuring Fabolous)

=== T.I. ===
- "You Ain't Fly"
- "All Night"

=== The Game ===
- "Beat 'Em Up"
- "I'll Find You"
- "Superman"
- "Fall Back" (featuring Freeway & City Boy of AZ Boys)

=== Twista ===
- "Ass Whoop" (featuring Saigon)

=== Tragedy Khadafi ===
- "Against All Odds"

=== Usher ===
- "Throwback (Remix)" (featuring Jadakiss)

=== Xzibit ===
- "Multiply (Remix)" (featuring Busta Rhymes)

== Soundtracks ==
- "NBA Street Vol. 2" by EA Sports BIG
- "Tiger Woods PGA Tour 2004" by EA Sports
- "NBA Ballers: Chosen One" by Midway Games
