= List of Roc-A-Fella Records artists =

This is a list of artists who have recorded for Roc-A-Fella Records.

A star (*) denotes an artist who no longer records for the label.

== A ==
- Amil*
- Aztek Escobar*

== B ==
- Beanie Sigel*

== C ==
- Cam'ron*
- Christión*

== D ==
- The Diplomats*
- DJ Clue*
- Denim (Rhashida Stafford)

== F ==
- Freeway*

== H ==
- Héctor el Father*

== J ==
- Jadakiss*
- Jay-Z
- Juelz Santana*

== K ==
- Kanye West*

== M ==
- M.O.P.*
- Memphis Bleek*
- Mickey & Mallory

== N ==
- N.O.R.E.*

== O ==
- Ol' Dirty Bastard*
- Omillio Sparks*
- Oschino Vasquez*

== P ==
- Peedi Crakk*

== R ==
- Rell*
- Rick Vocals*

== S ==
- Samantha Ronson*
- State Property*

== T ==
- Teairra Marí*
- Tru Life*

== U ==
- Uncle Murda*

== W ==
- Nicole Wray*

== Y ==
- Young Chris*
- Young Gunz*
- Young Steff*
