= This Time (Beanie Sigel album) =

Studio album by Beanie Sigel
- Released: August 28, 2012
- Recorded: 2010–2012
- Genre: Hip-hop
- Length: 46:59
- Label: State Property; Ruffhouse
- Producer: Cardiac; Chad "Wes" Hamilton; Deric "D-Dot" Angelettie; "Dirty Harry" Zelnick; Don Cheegro; Jay & PI; Shawn Kuiper

Beanie Sigel chronology
The Roc Boys (2010)	This Time (2012)

This Time is the sixth studio album by American rapper Beanie Sigel. It was released on August 28, 2012, through State Property/Ruffhouse Records. Production was handled by Don Cheegro, Shawn Kuiper, "Dirty Harry" Zelnick, Cardiac, Chad "Wes" Hamilton, Deric "D-Dot" Angelettie, Jay & PI. It features guest appearances from Akon, Corey Latif Williams, JT Roach, Junior Reid, Oliver Laing, Sean Anthony Francis, The Game, and Sigel's State Property groupmates Young Chris, Freeway, Omillio Sparks and Peedi Crakk.

In addition to being Sigel's last album before he reported to prison on September 12, 2012, to serve a two-year prison sentence for tax evasion, it was the first album released under the newly relaunched Ruffhouse Records following its own thirteen-year hiatus.

== Critical reception ==
Professional ratings
Aggregate scores
Source	Rating
Metacritic	76/100
Review scores
Source	Rating
AllMusic	4/5 stars
HipHopDX	4/5
Pitchfork	6/10
The New Zealand Herald	2/5
XXL	4/5 (XL)

This Time was met with generally favourable reviews from music critics. At Metacritic, which assigns a normalized rating out of 100 to reviews from mainstream publications, the album received an average score of 76, based on four reviews.

AllMusic's David Jeffries praised the album, saying "ten tight tracks, and that includes the epic "Intro", puts this on the man's top-shelf, where it sits next to The Reason as the album's flashy little brother". Slava Kuperstein of HipHopDX stated: "This Time isn't Sigel's strongest endorsement as an emcee--that would be The B. Coming--but it is a testament to his impeccable ability to select production". Mark Lelinwalla of XXL resumed: "with plenty of slick metaphors, complex wordplay and hard-hitting rhymes, Sigel comes out on top This Time".

In his mixed review for Pitchfork, Jayson Greene found the album "mostly serves as a reminder of why he's troubled more than why he's great".

== Track listing ==
This Time Track listing
No.	Title	Producer(s)	Length
1.	"Intro" (featuring Oliver Laing and Sean Anthony Francis)	SK	3:22
2.	"This Time" (featuring Oliver Laing)	Dirty Harry	4:28
3.	"That's All I Know" (featuring Akon)	Deric "D-Dot" Angelettie	3:48
4.	"Expensive Taste" (featuring Corey Latif Williams)	Jay & PI	4:35
5.	"Kush Dreaming"	Don Cheegro	5:32
6.	"Bang Bang Youth" (featuring Junior Reid)	Cardiak	4:36
7.	"Bad Boy Mack" (featuring JT Roach)	Chad "Wes" Hamilton	3:26
8.	"No Hook"	SK	4:08
9.	"The Reunion" (featuring State Property)	Don Cheegro	3:46
10.	"Sigel is What They Call Me" (featuring Sean Anthony Francis)	SK	5:00
11.	"Dangerous" (featuring Young Chris and The Game)	Dirty Harry	4:18
Total length:			46:59

== Personnel ==
- Dwight "Beanie Sigel" Grant – vocals, executive producer
- Oliver Laing – vocals (tracks: 1, 2)
- Sean Anthony Francis – vocals (tracks: 1, 10)
- Aliaune Akon Thiam – vocals (track 3)
- Corey Latif Williams – vocals (track 4)
- Delroy "Junior" Reid – vocals (track 6)
- John Thomas "JT" Roach – vocals (track 7)
- Christopher "Young Chris" Ries – vocals (tracks: 9, 11)
- Leslie "Freeway" Pridgen – vocals (track 9)
- Pedro "Peedi Crakk" Zayas – vocals (track 9)
- Kenneth "Omillio Sparks" Johnson – vocals (track 9)
- Jayceon "The Game" Taylor – vocals (track 11)
- Barni Cortez – guitar (track 2)
- Nick Bockrath – guitar (track 2)
- Stephen Lyons – bass (track 2)
- Michael S. Gayle – saxophone (track 5)
- Shawn Kuiper – producer (tracks: 1, 8, 10), vocal recording
- Alexander "Don Cheegro" Chiger – producer (tracks: 2, 5, 9, 11), executive producer
- "Dirty" Harry Zelnick – producer (tracks: 2, 11)
- Deric "D-Dot" Angelettie – producer (track 3)
- David Rivera – producer (track 4)
- Josh Rivera – producer (track 4)
- Cardiac – producer (track 6)
- Chad "Wes" Hamilton – producer (track 7)
- Vincent Dilorenzo – mixing (tracks: 1–6, 8–11)
- Phil Nicolo – mixing (track 7), mastering
- Joe Del Tufo – cover design, photography
- Brendan Mckeown – artwork design

== Charts ==
Chart (2012)	Peak position
US Top R&B/Hip-Hop Albums (Billboard)	33
US Independent Albums (Billboard)	41
