= State Property =

State Property may refer to:

- State Property (band), an American rap group led by Beanie Sigel
- State Property (film), a 2002 American crime film starring Beanie Sigel
- State Property (soundtrack), a soundtrack album from the film
- State property, state or public ownership of an enterprise or asset.
- State function, a type of thermodynamic property
