= Death of a Dynasty =

- Theatrical release poster
- Directed by: Damon Dash
- Written by: Adam Moreno
- Produced by: Steven C. Beer; Damon Dash; Isen Robbins; Aimee Schoof
- Starring: Ebon Moss-Bachrach; Kevin Hart; Capone; Rob Stapleton; Rashida Jones; Devon Aoki; Charlie Murphy; Damon Dash
- Cinematography: David Daniel
- Edited by: Chris Fiore
- Music by: Ron Feemster
- Distributed by: TLA Releasing
- Release dates: May 7, 2003 (premiere); April 29, 2005 (limited release)
- Running time: 92 minutes
- Country: United States
- Language: English
- Box office: $42,108

Death of a Dynasty is a 2003 American comedy film. It is a satire of the hip hop music industry, centered on Roc-A-Fella Records, and stars Ebon Moss-Bachrach, Capone, and Damon Dash. It also features cameo appearances by celebrities such as Jay-Z, Mariah Carey, Chloë Sevigny, Master P, Flavor Flav, and Carson Daly.

== Production and release ==
It premiered at the Tribeca Film Festival in 2003 and was also shown at the Cannes Film Festival. The film was not released to theaters in the United States until 2005. It was co-produced by Roc-A-Fella Films and distributed by TLA Releasing.

Damon Dash directed the film and Adam Moreno wrote its screenplay. The film was made in dedication to singer Aaliyah who was dating Damon Dash before her death on August 25, 2001.

== Cast ==
- Ebon Moss-Bachrach as Dave Katz
- Kevin Hart as P-Diddy / Cop 1 / Dance Coach / Hyper Rapper / H. Lector
- Capone Lee as Damon Dash
- Rob Stapleton as Jay-Z / Bootlegger 1 / Hot Boy 1 / "Dre" / A1 / Gay Guy
- Rashida Jones as Layna Hudson
- Devon Aoki as "Picasso"
- Charlie Murphy as Dick James / Dukey Man / Sock Head
- Damon Dash as "Harlem"
- Tony T. Roberts as Town Car Driver / Host
- Loon as Turk Stevens
- Stephanie Raye as Monica
- Beanie Sigel as Charles "Sandman" Patterson / Himself
- Funkmaster Flex as Biggs / Angry Blackman
- Chloë Sevigny as Sexy Woman #1
- Kari Wuhrer as Sexy Woman #2
- Jamie-Lynn Sigler as Sexy Woman #3
- Lorraine Bracco Enchante R&B Singer #2
- Duncan Sheik as Well-Dressed Man
- Andrew Kling as The Magician
- Ed Lover as Himself
- Doctor Dré as Himself
- Carson Daly as Himself
- Walt Frazier as Himself
- Rell as Himself
- Jay-Z as Himself
- Cam'ron as Himself
- Mark Ronson as Himself
- M.O.P. as Themselves
- State Property as Themselves
- Master P as Himself
- Mariah Carey as Herself
- Riddick Bowe as Himself
- Russell Simmons as Himself

== See also ==
- List of hood films
