= The Chain Gang Vol. 2 =

Studio album by State Property
- Released: August 12, 2003
- Recorded: 2002–2003
- Genres: East Coast hip hop; gangsta rap
- Labels: Criminal Background; Roc-A-Fella; Def Jam
- Producers: Shawn Carter (exec.); Damon Dash (exec.); Kareem "Biggs" Burke (exec.); Beanie Sigel (exec.); Just Blaze; Darrel "Digga" Branch; Bink!; Chad Hamilton; Black Key; The Alchemist; Boola; Henny Loc; Deric "D-Dot" Angelettie; Warryn Campbell; Sean "S-Dot" Francis; Spike & Jamahl; Ruggedness

State Property chronology
State Property (2002)	The Chain Gang Vol. 2 (2003)

Professional ratings
Review scores
Source	Rating
AllMusic	4/5 stars
HipHopDX	3.5/5 stars
RapReviews	(7/10)

The Chain Gang Vol. 2 (originally titled State Property 2) is the second studio album by American hip hop group State Property, released on August 12, 2003, by Roc-A-Fella and Def Jam Recordings. Its lead single, "Can't Stop Won't Stop", was nominated for Best Rap Performance by a Duo or Group at the 2004 Grammy Awards. The album sold 69,000 in its first week, and has since sold an estimated 300,000 units.

== Track listing ==
1. "Can't Stop, Won't Stop" (Young Gunz)
2. "It's On" (Beanie Sigel Featuring Jay-Z)
3. "Temporary Relief" (Peedi Crakk & Omillio Sparks)
4. "Rolling down the Freeway" (Freeway)
5. "B.B. Gun" (Young Gunz, Beanie Sigel, Peedi Crakk & Oschino)
6. "State Prop (You Know Us)" (Young Gunz & Beanie Sigel)
7. "When You Hear That" (Beanie Sigel & Peedi Crakk Featuring Dirt McGirt)
8. "Still in Effect" (Freeway & Neef)
9. "Blow" (Oschino & Sparks & Young Chris Featuring Twista)
10. "Been Down Too Long" (Oschino)
11. "G.A.M.E." (Peedi Crakk, Beanie Sigel, & Young Chris Featuring Lil' Cease)
12. "Just Another Nigga" (O & Sparks & Beanie Sigel)
13. "Want Me Back" (O & Sparks, Young Chris, & Freeway)
14. "See Clearly" (Peedi Crakk, Beanie Sigel, & Young Gunz)
15. "If I Could Do It All Again" (O & Sparks)
16. "Criminal Background" (Peedi Crakk & Young Chris)
17. "94 Bars" (Young Chris) [bonus track]

== Production ==
- Darrel "Digga" Branch — track 1
- Deric "D-Dot" Angelettie — track 2
- Boola — track 3, 6
- Bink Dogg — track 4
- Chad Hamilton — track 5, 9, 13, 16, 17
- Sean "S Dot" Francis — track 7
- Spike & Jamahl — track 2
- The Alchemist — track 8
- Black Key — track 10
- Henny Loc — track 11
- Ruggedness — track 12
- Warryn Campbell — track 14
- Black Key — track 15
- Just Blaze — track 18, track 10 (co-producer)

== Charts ==
=== Weekly charts ===
Chart (2003)	Peak position
US Billboard 200	6
US Top R&B/Hip-Hop Albums (Billboard)	1

=== Year-end charts ===
Chart (2003)	Position
US Top R&B/Hip-Hop Albums (Billboard)	77
