= Feel It in the Air =

Single by Beanie Sigel

Single by Beanie Sigel featuring MJ Songstress

from the album The B. Coming
- Released: January 18, 2005
- Genre: Hip hop
- Length: 4:06
- Label: Roc-A-Fella; Def Jam
- Songwriters: Beanie Sigel; Heavy D
- Producer: Heavy D

Beanie Sigel singles chronology
"Don't Stop" (2005)	"Feel It in the Air" (2005)	"All the Above" (2007)

Music video
- "Feel It in the Air" on YouTube

"Feel It in the Air" is a song by American rapper Beanie Sigel from his third studio album The B. Coming (2005). It is the third single from the album. The song was produced by Heavy D and features singer MJ Songstress.

== Composition ==
The song features "mournful noir" saxophone in the production and contains a sample of "Whole Lotta Something Goin' On" by Raphael Ravenscroft. Lyrically, Beanie Sigel poignantly reflects on his troubled life, rapping about his feelings and paranoia regarding it.

== Critical reception ==
In a review of The B. Coming, Andrew Friedman of Riverfront Times wrote, "The best of the melancholy tracks is a bizarre anti-single: 'Feel It in the Air' pits Beanie against a sax and his own thug spider-sense."

== Remixes ==
On December 2, 2022, American rapper Cordae released his own freestyle of the song.

== Charts ==
Chart (2005)	Peak position
US Hot R&B/Hip-Hop Songs (Billboard)	55

== Release history ==
Region	Date	Format(s)	Label(s)	Ref.
United States	January 18, 2005	Rhythmic contemporary; urban contemporary radio	Roc-A-Fella; IDJMG	
