= Paper Soldiers =

2002 film directed by Damon Dash & David Daniel

- DVD cover
- Directed by: Damon Dash; David Daniel
- Written by: Damon Dash; Charlie Murphy; Terrence Mosley
- Produced by: Damon Dash
- Starring: Kevin Hart; Beanie Sigel; Stacey Dash; Michael Rapaport; Memphis Bleek; Tiffany Withers; Jay-Z; Angie Martinez; Damon Dash; N.O.R.E. Charlie Murphy; Greg Travis; Cam’ron; Jim Jones; Kamal Ahmed; Jason Cerbone; Kevin Carroll; Derrick ‘Capone’ Lee; Capone; Jacob the Jeweler; Lil Cease; Patrice O’Neal; Chris Eric Williams; Derrick Simmons; Paul Sado; Derron ‘Smokey’ Edington
- Narrated by: Kevin Hart
- Production company: Universal Pictures
- Distributed by: Universal Studios Home Video
- Release date: June 7, 2002
- Running time: 88 minutes
- Country: United States
- Language: English

Paper Soldiers is a 2002 American urban crime comedy film. This hip-hop comedy from Roc-A-Fella's film division stars Kevin Hart in his film debut, Beanie Sigel, and Stacey Dash. Rapper Jay-Z appears in a cameo role. Hart plays the character Shawn, a rookie thief, who is part of a crew of thieves, doing small-time jobs like house breaking.

The crew itself is not exactly a highly polished operation, and the crew's capers result in comic mishaps far more often than actual thefts. They still manage to do some jobs like breaking into Jay-Z's house and robbing some of its material goods, but predictably, they receive prison time for robbery or aggravated assault.

Beanie Sigel plays Stu, a hot-headed hood bully who does small robberies to make some cash, while Damon Dash and Memphis Bleek act as thieves of another crew, and Stacey Dash is a beautiful woman named Tamika. Jay-Z appears as himself. Released on June 7, 2002, it was produced by Roc-A-Fella and distributed by Universal Pictures.

== Plot ==
Shawn, a low level employee at a beeper shop, is on parole. Following the death of his mother, Shawn declines an offer by his friend Burtie to participate in burglaries, but when his low income prevents him paying his bills, he decides to go along and starts to make more money robbing houses than by honest work.

Shawn robs a house with his friend Stu, just released from jail, but a neighbor spots them and they are chased by Detectives Johnson and Travis. Shawn escapes, but Stu is arrested. After Burtie is jailed, Shawn joins a crew headed by Burtie's brother Will. Will's partner Larry joins the pair on a robbery but encounter Damon Dash and Memphis Bleek already robbing their intended target house. Damon and Memphis are familiar with Will and Larry, and they agree to split the loot.

Shawn robs Jay-Z's home with Johnny, then takes his girlfriend Monique out to a club to celebrate his birthday with Will, Larry and Johnny. Shawn encounters recently released Stu, who notices Pat, the mother of his children, out with a man named Rudy. Stu assaults Rudy and tries to leave with Pat. When she rejects him he also assaults her.

Shawn's parole officer warns him that another failed urine test will result in his return to jail. Shawn's recently fired former co-worker Kay joins Shawn's burglarly ring as a driver and lookout. When Shawn and Johnny burglarize a house, the paranoid Kay deserts them, returns after a change of heart, but is apprehended after a police chase that Shawn and Johnny escape.

Shawn's parole officer informs him of another failed urine test and Monique, unhappy with his life of crime, calls the authorities. Shawn flees to an auto body shop and discusses business with Will and Larry and shop employee Mikey O, who tips them off to a wealthy home-owner. During the ensuing burglary, Detectives Johnson and Travis capture Mikey O's friend Mike E. and Larry while Shawn and Will escape. Shawn goes home to say goodbye to Monique and their son before fleeing town, but finds she has left an empty house. Shawn is captured by police and receives a 6-12-year prison sentence.

The film ends as it began, with Shawn playing dominoes with Burtie and Johnny, as he delivers a message to the audience to not break into homes.

== Cast ==
- Kevin Hart as Shawn
- Beanie Sigel as Stu
- Stacey Dash as Tamika
- Tiffany Withers as Monique
- Paul Sado as Johnny
- Derron 'Smokey' Edington as Burtie
- Capone as The Barber's Man
- N.O.R.E. as KB
- Charlie Murphy as Detective Johnson
- Greg Travis as Detective Travis
- Memphis Bleek as himself
- Jay-Z as himself
- Damon Dash as himself
- Jason Cerbone as Mikey O
- Kamal Ahmed as Shawn's Boss
- Jacob 'The Jeweler' as Joshua Rosen
- Derrick 'Capone' Lee as Will
- Kevin Carroll as Larry
- Chris Eric Williams as Kay
- Michael Rapaport as Mike E.
- Angie Martinez as Parole Officer
- Harold 'Stumpy' Cromer as Old Man
- Ross Haines as Timothy Briggs
- James Dickson as Fat Man
- Derrick Simmons as Rudy
- Luis Feliz as Bodega Owner
- James Johnson as Da Boss
- Cam'ron as Masked Dominican #1
- Jim Jones as Masked Dominican #2
- Lil' Cease as Parolee
- Patrice O'Neal as Big T

== Reception ==
Nathan Rabin gave the film a mixed review in The Dissolve, claiming the film was an example of "rapsploitation" and that plot was "wobbly", while also crediting the film for being able to bring "its world context and color".

== See also ==
- List of hood films
