= Young Gunz =

American hip hop duo

- Also known as: Chris and Neef
- Origin: Philadelphia, Pennsylvania, U.S.
- Genres: Hip hop
- Occupation: Rappers
- Years active: 2001–present
- Labels: Roc-A-Fella; Def Jam; Young Gunz Media; MyArtistDNA
- Members: Neef Buck; Young Chris

Young Gunz is an American hip hop duo from Philadelphia, composed of rappers Young Chris (born Chris Ries, March 9, 1983) and Neef Buck (born Hanif Muhammad, March 30, 1983). The group is part of Beanie Sigel's State Property collective and were signed to Jay-Z's Roc-A-Fella Records. Their 2003 debut single, "Can't Stop, Won't Stop", reached the top 15 on the Billboard Hot 100.

== History ==
=== State Property ===
Ries and Muhammad had been friends since they were youths on the block (C-Ave). On "Takeover", a track from his 2001 album The Blueprint, Jay-Z announced the duo as "Chris and Neef".

In 2002, the duo performed on the State Property soundtrack album. Chris and Neef starred in the titular movie. Also during this period, Young Chris appeared on Damon Dash's Dream Team compilation, and Beanie Sigel's The Reason. The duo made guest appearances on Jay-Z's The Blueprint 2, Freeway's Philadelphia Freeway, State Property's The Chain Gang Vol. 2, and Memphis Bleek's M.A.D.E., while recording their album.

The Young Gunz scored their first hit with "Can't Stop, Won't Stop", the lead-off single from the Chain Gang, Vol. 2 album. Its song and video received major airplay on hip-hop radio, MTV2, and BET and reached number 14 on the U.S. Billboard Hot 100 chart and number 6 on the Billboard Hot Rap Tracks chart.

=== As a group ===
After the success of their single, "Can't Stop, Won't Stop", the label jumped and was ready to release their debut album, Tough Luv. It included the remix to "Can't Stop, Won't Stop", which featured St. Louis rapper Chingy. Singles included "No Better Love" featuring former Roc-A-Fella Records crooner Rell and the Just Blaze-produced "Friday Night". Tough Luv debuted on the Billboard 200 at number 3, selling 128,000 copies in its first week. The album charted behind labelmate Kanye West's debut album, The College Dropout, which had been released two weeks earlier.

After a brief hiatus, the duo returned with Swizz Beatz produced "Set It Off" from their second album, Brothers from Another. The album, released May 24, 2005, had disappointing sales compared to the group's debut, despite exposure of the lead single, promotion by Jay-Z, and TV, radio, and magazine appearances. It was the second release from the "new" Roc-A-Fella Records, referencing when Jay-Z became president of Def Jam Records, the first being Memphis Bleek's 534. The album debuted on the Billboard 200 at number 15, and included guest features from Kanye West, Swizz Beatz, Slim of 112 and John Legend.

=== Disputes with other rap artists ===
The Young Gunz were involved in a feud with West Coast rapper, The Game. The feud stems from The Game's beef with Memphis Bleek, which later extended to the Roc-A-Fella camp excluding Kanye West, Jay-Z and Just Blaze. The Game dissed Bleek and The Young Gunz on his 15-minute freestyle track "300 Bars and Runnin'". The Young Gunz, along with Pooda Brown, responded with a freestyle of their own. Chris and Neef became involved in a beef with actor, comedian and rapper, Katt Williams, which stemmed from the Young Gunz song "Set It Off", in which a character portrayed by Katt Williams was referenced as a "fake ass pimp." The Game and Williams later dissed the duo in a freestyle over the "Set It Off" beat.

=== Young Chris solo work ===
As early as March 2006, Young Chris thought about recording a solo album. He initially titled it Now or Never. He stated to XXL magazine that he wanted to release a solo album by the end of 2008 and had been "95 percent done" by June 2008. In this article, Chris also states that he feels himself up there with Lil Wayne and Juelz Santana. Since this time, Chris has taken to the internet to solidify himself as a top solo artist, with his YoungChris.com Social Network, hitting the remix circuit, and his much anticipated "The Network" Mixtape series, hosted by DJ Don Cannon. Later in 2010 signed with Division 1, a label started by Rico Love, under the Universal Motown umbrella. Love considers Young Chris his flagship artist and has worked closely with him on his debut album and pre-album mixtape. The mixtape, titled The Re-Introduction, was released on November 20, 2010. It marked Young Chris's debut as a solo artist and also reunited DJ Drama and Don Cannon, former members of the Aphilliates, who hosted their first mixtape together in several years.

On January 28, a song called "Philly Shit (Mega Mix)" featuring Eve, Black Thought, Money Malc, Fat Joe, Fred the Godson, Diggy Simmons, Jermaine Dupri and Game, was leaked.

== Discography ==
=== Solo albums ===
- Tough Luv (2004)
- Brothers from Another (2005)

=== Collaboration albums ===
- State Property (with State Property) (2002)
- The Chain Gang Vol. 2 (with State Property) (2003)

== Filmography ==
- State Property (2002)
- Fade to Black (2004)
- State Property 2 (2005)
