= State Property (soundtrack) =

2002 studio album/soundtrack by State Property

Studio album and soundtrack by State Property
- Released: January 29, 2002
- Recorded: 2001
- Genres: East Coast hip hop, gangsta rap
- Labels: Roc-A-Fella; Def Jam
- Producers: Shawn Carter (exec.), Damon Dash (exec.), Kareem "Biggs" Burke (exec.), Kanye West, Quran Goodman, Mo Betta, Black Key, Just Blaze

State Property chronology
State Property (2002)	The Chain Gang Vol. 2 (2003)

Singles from State Property
- 1. "Roc the Mic" Released: January 8, 2002

Professional ratings
Review scores
Source	Rating
AllMusic	3/5 stars
HipHopDX	3.5/5 stars
RapReviews	(6/10)

State Property is the soundtrack to State Property, as well as the debut studio album by State Property. The album spawned one single "Roc the Mic", which was a minor hit, making it to No. 55 on the Billboard Hot 100. The remix to "Roc the Mic" features St. Louis rappers Nelly and Murphy Lee of the St. Lunatics and was included on Nelly's 2002 album Nellyville as a radio-only single.

The album features a sole guest appearance by R&B singer Rell, who starred as Butter in the film.

== Commercial performance ==
State Property debuted and peaked at number 14 on the Billboard 200, No. 1 on the Top R&B/Hip-Hop Albums chart and No. 2 on the Top Soundtracks chart. The album sold over 51,500 copies in its first week, and was a success.

== Track listing ==
No.	Title	Writer(s)	Producer(s)	Length
1.	"Roc the Mic" (Beanie Sigel & Freeway)	Dwight Grant; Leslie Pridgen; Justin Smith	Just Blaze	4:25
2.	"Sun Don't Shine" (Young Gunz, Oschino, & Freeway)	Christopher Ries; Oschino; L. Pridgen; Hanif Thamavong	Ruggedness	4:12
3.	"It's Not Right" (Freeway, Young Chris, Sparks & Beanie Sigel)	L. Pridgen; C. Ries; Kenneth Jackson; D. Grant; J. Smith	Just Blaze	4:13
4.	"Do You Want Me" (Young Chris, Sparks & Oschino)	C. Ries; K. Jackson; Oschino; R. Thomas	Rick Rock	4:10
5.	"Sing My Song" (Sparks & Oschino)	K. Jackson; Oschino; Zukhan	Zukhan	4:49
6.	"No Glory" (Beanie Sigel)	D. Grant; Joseph Johnson	N.O. Joe	4:54
7.	"Bitch Niggas" (Beanie Sigel & Sparks)	D. Grant; K. Jackson; J. Smith	Just Blaze	5:29
8.	"Why Must I ?" (Beanie Sigel & Sparks)	D. Grant; K. Jackson; Qu'ran	Qu'ran	4:08
9.	"International Hustler" (Freeway)	L. Pridgen; D.R Period	D.R Period	4:16
10.	"Hood I Know" (Beanie Sigel, Freeway, Young Chris, Sparks & Oschino)	D. Grant; L. Pridgen; C. Ries; K. Jackson; Oschino; Bernard Parker	Big Demi	4:20
11.	"Got Nowhere" (Beanie Sigel & Freeway)	D. Grant; L. Pridgen; K. West	Kanye West	4:00
12.	"Trouble Man" (Beanie Sigel, Sparks & Oschino)	D. Grant; K. Jackson; Oschino	T.T. & Mo Betta	4:36
13.	"Don't Realize" (Beanie Sigel featuring Rell)	D. Grant; Rell; J. Smith	Just Blaze	4:16

== Charts ==
=== Weekly charts ===
Chart (2002)	Peak position
US Billboard 200	14
US Top R&B/Hip-Hop Albums (Billboard)	1
US Soundtrack Albums (Billboard)	2

=== Year-end charts ===
Chart (2002)	Position
US Top R&B/Hip-Hop Albums (Billboard)	64
