= Roc the Mic =

- Vinyl cover

Single by State Property featuring Beanie Sigel and Freeway

from the album State Property
- Released: January 8, 2002
- Recorded: 2001
- Genre: Hip hop
- Length: 4:25; 4:18 (Nellyville remix version)
- Label: Roc-A-Fella; Def Jam
- Songwriters: Dwight Grant; Leslie Pridgen; Justin Smith
- Producer: Just Blaze

State Property singles chronology
"Roc the Mic" (2002)	"Can't Stop, Won't Stop" (2003)

Beanie Sigel singles chronology
"Think It's a Game" (2001)	"Roc the Mic" (2002)	"Guess Who's Back" (2002)

Freeway singles chronology
"Line 'Em Up" (2002)	"Roc the Mic" (2002)	"What We Do" (2002)

"Roc the Mic" is the first single to be released from the soundtrack of the 2002 crime film State Property and was performed by Beanie Sigel and Freeway. The single was so far the highest-charting single from both rappers making it to #55 on the US Billboard Hot 100.

== Remix ==
The remix to "Roc the Mic" features St. Louis rappers Nelly and Murphy Lee of the St. Lunatics and was included on rapper Nelly's 2002 album, Nellyville as a radio-only single. The single also appears on The Source Presents: Hip Hop Hits, Vol. 6 and The Roc Files, Vol. 1. Singer Aaliyah was originally intended to feature on the "Roc the Mic" remix, but died on August 25, 2001.

== Track listing ==
A-side

A1. "Roc the Mic" (radio edit)
A2. "Roc the Mic" (LP version)

B-side

B1. "Roc the Mic" (instrumental)
B2. "Roc the Mic" (a capella)

== Charts ==
=== Weekly charts ===
Chart (2002)	Peak position
US Billboard Hot 100	55
US Hot R&B/Hip-Hop Songs (Billboard)	16
US Hot Rap Songs (Billboard)	16
US Rhythmic Airplay (Billboard)	30

=== Year-end charts ===
Chart (2002)	Position
US Hot R&B/Hip-Hop Songs (Billboard)	59
