= Can't Stop, Won't Stop (Young Gunz song) =

Single by Young Gunz

from the album The Chain Gang Vol. 2 and Tough Luv
- Released: 2003
- Recorded: 2002
- Genre: Hip hop
- Length: 3:43
- Label: Roc-A-Fella, Def Jam
- Songwriters: Branch, D./Glover, N./Glover, M./Morris, E./Muhammed, H./Myers, D./Ries, C./Wiggins, R./Williams, G./Marlon Williams
- Producer: Darrel "Digga" Branch

Young Gunz singles chronology
"Can't Stop, Won't Stop" (2003)	"No Better Love" (2004)

State Property singles chronology
"Roc the Mic" (2002)	"Can't Stop, Won't Stop" (2003)

"Can't Stop, Won't Stop" is the debut single by American hip hop duo Young Gunz, members of Philadelphia hip hop group State Property, from the 2003 album The Chain Gang Vol. 2. A remix version appeared on the Young Gunz' debut album Tough Luv featuring Chingy. It became a major hit and the highest charting State Property song to come out of the group, peaking at #14 on the U.S. Billboard Hot 100. It was nominated at the Grammys for Best Rap Performance by a Duo or Group in 2004.

== Track listing ==
12" single

A-side
A1. "Can't Stop, Won't Stop" (clean)
A2. "Can't Stop, Won't Stop" (street)

B-side
B1. "Can't Stop, Won't Stop" (instrumental)
B2. "Can't Stop, Won't Stop" (acapella)

== Charts ==
=== Weekly charts ===
Chart (2003)	Peak position
US Billboard Hot 100	14
US Hot R&B/Hip-Hop Songs (Billboard)	10
US Hot Rap Songs (Billboard)	6
US Rhythmic Airplay (Billboard)	9

=== Year-end charts ===
Chart (2003)	Position
US Billboard Hot 100	85
US Hot R&B/Hip-Hop Songs (Billboard)	45
