= The Broad Street Bully =

Studio album by Beanie Sigel
- Released: September 1, 2009
- Recorded: 2008–2009
- Genre: Hip-hop
- Length: 40:01
- Label: Siccness
- Producer: Beanie Sigel Production Team; HazeBanga; Isiah Salizar; The Batkave; Buckwild

Beanie Sigel chronology
The Solution (2007)	The Broad Street Bully (2009)	The Roc Boys (2010)

Professional ratings
Review scores
Source	Rating
AllMusic	3/5 stars
Cokemachineglow	75/100%
HipHopDX	3.5/5
Pitchfork	7.5/10
XXL	L (3/5)

The Broad Street Bully is the fifth solo album by the American rapper Beanie Sigel. It was released on September 1, 2009, via Siccness.net. Production was handled by Beanie Sigel Production Team, HazeBanga, Isiah Salizar, the Batkave and Buckwild. It features guest appearances from Young Chris, Freeway, Mil and Omillio Sparks.

The album debuted at number 77 on the Billboard 200, number 13 on the Top R&B/Hip-Hop Albums, number 5 on the Top Rap Albums and number 7 on the Independent Albums charts in the United States selling 6,500 copies. It fell down to number 115 on the Billboard 200 the following week with additional 4,000 copies sold before disappearing from the chart.

== Background ==
The album marks Beanie Sigel's first studio album released on an independent record label following his departure from Def Jam Recordings.

== Track listing ==
No.	Title	Producer(s)	Length
1.	"Beanie"	Beanie Sigel Production Team	1:23
2.	"Why Wouldn't I"	Beanie Sigel Production Team	3:53
3.	"Tear Drops"	Beanie Sigel Production Team	3:03
4.	"Where's My Opponent" (featuring Omillio Sparks and Freeway)	Beanie Sigel Production Team	3:00
5.	"Ready for War" (featuring Freeway and Young Chris)	Beanie Sigel Production Team	3:59
6.	"All for It"	Beanie Sigel Production Team	3:02
7.	"Sicker Than Your Average" (featuring Freeway)	The Batkave	3:33
8.	"Run to the Roc" (featuring Young Chris and Omillio Sparks)	Beanie Sigel Production Team	3:47
9.	"Bang Bang" (featuring Mil)	Beanie Sigel Production Team	3:13
10.	"Return of the Chain Gang" (featuring Young Chris)	Beanie Sigel Production Team	2:39
11.	"You Over Did It" (featuring Young Chris and Mil)	HazeBanga; Isiah Salizar	4:37
12.	"The Ghetto"	Buckwild	3:52
Total length:			40:01

== Charts ==
Chart (2009)	Peak position
US Billboard 200	77
US Top R&B/Hip-Hop Albums (Billboard)	13
US Top Rap Albums (Billboard)	5
US Independent Albums (Billboard)	7
