= The B. Coming =

Studio album by Beanie Sigel
- Released: March 29, 2005
- Recorded: 2002–2004
- Genre: Hip-hop
- Length: 65:45
- Labels: Damon Dash; Criminal Background; Island Def Jam
- Producers: The Neptunes; Heavy D; Buckwild; DJ Scratch; Just Blaze; Bink!; D-Dot; Ty Fyffe; Boola; Chad Hamilton; Aqua; Ruggedness; Neckbones

Beanie Sigel chronology
The Reason (2001)	The B. Coming (2005)	The Solution (2007)

The B. Coming is the third studio album by American rapper Beanie Sigel. Originally scheduled for an October 2004 release, the album was ultimately released on March 29, 2005 through Damon Dash Music Group, Criminal Background Records, and The Island Def Jam Music Group.

== Background and release ==
It was supposed to be released in 2004 under Roc-A-Fella Records and distributed by Def Jam Recordings. However, due to Jay-Z's takeover of Roc-A-Fella and presidency of Def Jam, Sigel left the label to join Dame Dash Music Group, where the album was released on March 29, 2005. The B. Coming contains 15 songs, with special guests including Freeway, Redman, Snoop Dogg, Bun B, Jay-Z, Cam'ron, and others. The album was completed before Sigel served a federal prison sentence in mid-2004.

== Critical reception ==
Professional ratings
Aggregate scores
Source	Rating
Metacritic	73/100
Review scores
Source	Rating
AllMusic	4/5 stars
Blender	3/5 stars
Entertainment Weekly	B+
NME	4/5 stars
Pitchfork	8.5/10
Rolling Stone	3/5 stars
Vibe	3.5/5 stars

At Metacritic, which assigns a normalized rating out of 100 to reviews from professional publications, the album received an average score of 73 out of 100 based on 14 reviews.

On AllMusic, reviewer David Jeffries stated: "One thing to know is that it's not a linear journal. Instead, it consists of fragments from here and there that deal very little with situations and more with mindsets. [...] Those looking for a direct story of how Beanie earned three years in the clink will be somewhat disappointed, but these chunks of insight into the man's turmoil -- and the couple party tunes that go with them -- add up to one hell of an album." Ryan Dombal of Entertainment Weekly stated that the album "finds [Sigel] at his most vulnerable — and his best." NME deemed the album as "defiant as ever". Tom Breihan, writing for Pitchfork, commented: "Only two things matter here: the production, which is masterful, and Beanie himself, a virtuoso of lonely, bitter desperation." Stylus Magazine gave the album a B+ rating with an additional comment: "One of the strongest albums of 2005, Beanie Sigel stands among the greatest of the Roc-A-Fella catalogue with technical ability and an emotional severity worth experiencing." Toshitaka Kondo of Vibe said in a review, "At times, he overreaches." Rolling Stone's Bill Werde thought that "The B. Coming starts strong... [and] eventually flattens out into dark, brooding territory." The B. Coming ranked number 32 as Pitchfork's Top 50 Albums of 2005 in the year end.

== Commercial performance ==
The B. Coming debuted at number three on the Billboard 200, with first-week sales of 130,000 copies. The album was two slots away from 50 Cent's The Massacre.

== Track listing ==
The B. Coming Track listing
No.	Title	Writer(s)	Producer(s)	Length
1.	"Feel It in the Air" (featuring MJ Songstress)	Dwight Grant; Dwight Myers; David Lewis	Heavy D	4:05
2.	"I Can't Go On This Way" (featuring Freeway and Young Chris)	Grant; Nicholas McCarrell; Chris Reis; Leslie Pridgen; Tom Brocker; Lunie McLeod	Aqua	5:02
3.	"One Shot Deal" (featuring Redman)	Grant; Reggie Noble; Roosevelt Harrell	Bink!	4:05
4.	"Gotta Have It" (featuring Peedi Peedi and Twista)	Grant; Carl Mitchell; Pedro Zayas; Chad Hamilton; Norman Whitfield; Terral Santiel; Lequeint Jobe; Henry Garner; Michael Moore; Kenny Copeland; Kenji Brown; Michael Nash; Freddie Dunn; Gwen Dickey	Chad Hamilton	3:28
5.	"Don't Stop" (featuring Snoop Dogg)	Grant; Pharrell Williams; Calvin Broadus	The Neptunes	3:31
6.	"Purple Rain" (featuring Bun B)	Grant; George Spivey; Bernard Freeman; Anthony Hester	DJ Scratch	5:16
7.	"Oh Daddy" (featuring Young Chris)	Grant; Alrad Lewis; Ries; Christine McVie	Boola	4:32
8.	"Change" (featuring MJ Songstress and Rell)	Grant; Tyrone Fyffe; Melissa Butts; Gerrell Gaddis; Angela Winbush; René Moore	Ty Fyffe	4:35
9.	"Bread & Butter" (featuring Grand Puba and Sadat X)	Grant; Justin Smith; Maxwell Dixon; John Watson	Just Blaze	5:39
10.	"Lord Have Mercy"	Grant; Melvin Carter	Ruggedness	4:20
11.	"Flatline" (featuring Peedi Peedi)	Grant; Zayas; A. Lewis; Marvin Gaye	Boola	3:02
12.	"Tales of a Hustler, Pt. 2" (featuring Oschino and Omillio Sparks)	Grant; A. Lewis; Klaus Doldinger	Boola	4:18
13.	"Look At Me Now" (featuring Rell)	Grant; Anthony Best; Greg Perry; Angelo Bond	Buckwild	4:01

Bonus tracks
No.	Title	Writer(s)	Producer(s)	Length
14.	"It's On" (featuring Jay-Z)	Grant; Shawn Carter; Jamahl Rye; Kenneth Cunningham; Michael McCurtis; A. Ray	D-Dot	5:03
15.	"Wanted (On the Run)" (featuring Cam'ron)	Jon Bon Jovi; Richie Sambora	Da Neckbones	4:27
Total length:				65:45

Leftover tracks

- "Beans to the Rhyme" (featuring Young Chris)

== Samples ==
- "Feel It In The Air" – "Whole Lotta Something Goin On" by Raphael Ravenscroft
- "I Can’t Go On This Way" – "Love Me, Love Me or Leave Me, Leave Me" by Gloria Scott
- "Gotta Have It" – "That’s What’s Wrong With Me" by Rose Royce
- "Purple Rain" – "In The Rain" by The Dramatics
- "Oh Daddy" – "Oh Daddy" by Natalie Cole
- "Change" – "My First Love" by Rene and Angela
- "Bread & Butter" – "Proud Of You" by Johnny "Guitar" Watson
- "Flatline" – "Poor Abbey Walsh" by Marvin Gaye
- "Look At Me Now" – "Come On Down (To Get Your Head Out of the Clouds)" by Greg Perry (singer)
- "It's On" – "Questions" by Carrie Lucas
- "Wanted (On The Run)" – "Wanted Dead Or Alive" by Bon Jovi

== Charts ==
=== Weekly charts ===
Chart (2005)	Peak position
Canadian Albums (Nielsen SoundScan)	47
US Billboard 200	3
US Top R&B/Hip-Hop Albums (Billboard)	1

=== Year-end charts ===
Chart (2005)	Position
US Billboard 200	189
US Top R&B/Hip-Hop Albums (Billboard)	36

== Singles chart positions ==
Year	Song	Chart positions		
Year	Song	Billboard Hot 100	Hot R&B/Hip-Hop Singles & Tracks	Hot Rap Singles
2004	"Gotta Have It"	-	82	-
2005	"Don't Stop"	-	67	-
2005	"Feel It in the Air"	-	55	-
