= Rocawear =

Clothing brand

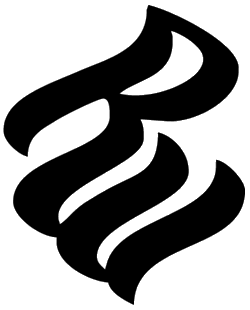
- Industry: Textile
- Founded: 1999; 27 years ago
- Founders: Damon Dash; Shawn Carter
- Headquarters: New York City, New York, US
- Key people: Shawn Carter (CEO), Damon Dash (chairman)
- Products: Clothing, footwear, perfume and fashion accessories
- Revenue: $700 million (FY 2007)
- Owner: Iconix Brand Group
- Website: rocawear.com

Rocawear (stylized Roc-A-Wear) is an American clothing brand founded in 1999 by Roc-A-Fella Records co-founders Damon Dash and Shawn "Jay-Z" Carter. The brand has had annual sales of $700 million. Rocawear expanded through licensing to sell affordable clothes for children and juniors; socks and sandals; leather, suede, and fur outerwear; handbags and belts; lounge wear; big and tall; headwear; jewelry; and sunglasses; as well as co-branded product with Pro-Keds, State Property, and Team Roc.

== History ==
In late September 2005, Dash severed ties with Jay-Z and sold his stake in Rocawear for a reported $22.5 million USD, making Jay-Z the sole owner of the company.

R&B singer Ciara signed to be the new face of Rocawear in 2007 for the 'I Will Not Lose' campaign. Chris Brown, Memphis rap collective Three 6 Mafia, radio personality Ebro Darden, Toccara and Rich Boy were amongst the other celebrities who were part of the campaign.

In March 2007, Jay-Z sold the intellectual property rights to the Rocawear brand to Iconix Brand Group for $204 million. Jay-Z retained his stake in the company and continued to oversee the marketing, licensing, and product development. In May 2018, the Securities and Exchange Commission (SEC) sought out Jay-Z's testimony in relation to possible security law violations made by Iconix.

In March 2009, Rocawear launched its first social networking site, offering style news, music, fashion, and cultural connections.

In August 2011, Jay-Z confirmed via Twitter that Rocawear had partnered with Pharrell Williams' clothing label, Billionaire Boys Club.

In 2012, Rocawear was a €490 million clothing business.

In November 2018, Jay-Z successfully halted a $204 million lawsuit between Roc Nation and Iconix over the lack of black arbitrators in the US. In 2019, Jay-Z repurchased the intellectual property rights to Rocawear for $15 million as part of a settlement with Iconix.
