= The Reason (Beanie Sigel album) =

Studio album by Beanie Sigel
- Released: June 26, 2001
- Recorded: 2000–2001
- Genre: Hip-hop
- Length: 60:40
- Label: Roc-A-Fella; Black Friday; Island Def Jam
- Producer: Shawn Carter (exec.); Damon Dash (exec.); Kareem "Biggs" Burke (exec.); Just Blaze; Kanye West; Rick Rock; 88-Keys; No I.D.; Sha-Self; Bernard "Big Demi" Parker

Beanie Sigel chronology
The Truth (2000)	The Reason (2001)	The B. Coming (2005)

The Reason is the second studio album by Philadelphia rapper Beanie Sigel, released on Roc-A-Fella Records. Originally scheduled for a June 12, 2001 release, the album was ultimately released June 26, 2001. The album contains 14 tracks, and special guests include Memphis Bleek, Jay-Z, Freeway, Omillio Sparks, Scarface, Daz, Kurupt, and Rell.

It received positive reviews from critics divided over Sigel's lyrical abilities as a rapper. The Reason debuted at number five on the Billboard 200 and spawned two singles: "Beanie (Mack Bitch)" and "Think It's a Game".

== Reception ==
=== Critical reception ===
Professional ratings
Review scores
Source	Rating
AllMusic	3/5 stars
Blender	3/5 stars
Entertainment Weekly	B+
HipHopDX	3/5 stars
Los Angeles Times	2/4 stars
NME	4/5 stars
Q	3/5 stars
RapReviews	7.5/10
Robert Christgau	(dud)
The Source	4/5 stars

The Reason garnered positive reviews from music critics who commended the record's East Coast production but questioned Sigel's abilities as a credible rapper. Andy Capper of NME found some familiarity in the album's beats but praised Sigel's dark-yet-intriguing delivery along with a talented list of guest artists, calling it "one of the best hardcore rap records of the year 2001." Steve 'Flash' Juon of RapReviews praised the lyrical delivery and production for being an upgrade from Sigel's debut effort The Truth, saying that, "[I]n the pantheon of Philadelphia rap from The Roots to Will Smith, make room for a mack (bitch) - he's definitely earned his right to shine." Entertainment Weekly's Evan Serpick said that, "Sigel will never sound as urgent as Chuck D or as smooth as Method Man, but the Jay-Z protégé makes up for it with smarter-than-average gangsta lyrics and eclectic hip-hop beats." Nick Catucci of Blender wrote that, "Throughout the disc, Beanie stalks through the subdued bounce of big, loose piano and horn riffs, his smooth but steely flow intact. There's a sequel to his first album's not-so-pretty prison tale "What Ya Life Like" here, but it's best hearing about Beans's life when he's feeling nice, not nasty."

AllMusic writer Bret Love commended the production for remaining consistent and Sigel's persona of a street smart hustler but found it running its course as the album continued, concluding that "Sigel's sophomore effort isn't so much an artistic step forward as it is a step sideways." HipHopDX writer Affrikka said that despite the first two tracks, the record starts to fall off into mediocre un-originality, saying that "Overall, the experience leaves you wanting more from the executive producing credit that Jay-Z takes. It’s almost as if anyone involved in this project expected listeners to not get past the first couple songs." Soren Baker, writing for the Los Angeles Times, commented that "[T]he normally assertive and interesting Philadelphia rapper flows like a sloth on nearly every cut of his second album, failing to elicit much excitement despite the solid, hard-core production." Robert Christgau graded the album as a "dud", indicating "a bad record whose details rarely merit further thought."

=== Commercial performance ===
The Reason debuted at number five on the Billboard 200 selling 151,000 copies in its first week. On its second week, it dropped to number 11 with sales dropping 50% to 75,000 copies.

== Track listing ==
The Reason track listing
No.	Title	Writer(s)	Producer(s)	Length
1.	"Nothing Like It"	Dwight Grant; Kanye West; Nickolas Ashford; Valerie Simpson	Kanye West	3:22
2.	"Beanie (Mack Bitch)"	Grant; Justin Smith	Just Blaze	4:13
3.	"So What You Saying" (featuring Memphis Bleek)	Grant; Smith; Malik Cox; William Nichols; Allen Williams; George Clinton; Walter Morrison; Garry Shider	Just Blaze	5:06
4.	"Get Down"	Grant; Smith; Quincy Jones	Just Blaze	4:58
5.	"I Don't Do Much"	Grant; Ricardo Thomas	Rick Rock	4:40
6.	"For My Niggas" (featuring Daz)	Grant; Thomas	Rick Rock	4:12
7.	"Watch Your Bitches"	Grant; Charles Njapa	88-Keys	3:46
8.	"Think It's a Game" (featuring Jay-Z, Freeway, and Young Chris)	Grant; Bernard Parker; Karl Patrick; James Easely; Shawn Carter; Christopher Ries	Bernard "Big Demi" Parker; Karl "Bubb" Patrick (co.)	5:33
9.	"Man's World"	Grant; Dion Wilson; James Brown; Betty Jean Newsome	No I.D.	3:50
10.	"Gangsta, Gangsta" (featuring Kurupt)	Grant; West	Kanye West	3:41
11.	"Tales of a Hustler" (featuring Sparks)	Grant; Michael Clervoix	Sha-Self	3:55
12.	"Mom Praying" (featuring Scarface)	Grant; Smith; Brad Jordan; Harvey Scales	Just Blaze	4:40
13.	"Still Got Love for You" (featuring Jay-Z and Rell)	Grant; Smith; Carter; Isaac Hayes; Gerrell Gaddis	Just Blaze	4:21
14.	"What Your Life Like 2"	Grant; Smith; Alec R. Costandinos; Michael Jouveaux	Just Blaze	4:23
Total length:				60:40

Samples

- "Nothing Like It" contains a sample from "Ain't Nothing Like the Real Thing", written by Nickolas Ashford and Valerie Simpson, and performed by The Dynamic Superiors.
- "So What You Saying" contains samples of:
  - "If It Don't Turn You One", written by William Nichols and Allen Williams, and performed by B.T. Express.
  - "One Nation Under a Groove", written by George Clinton, Walter Morrison, and Garry Shider.
- "Get Down" contains a sample of "The Lost Man", written and performed by Quincy Jones.
- "Man's World" contains a sample from "It's a Man's Man's Man's World", written by James Brown and Betty Jean Newsome, and performed by James Brown.
- "Mom Praying" contains a sample of "It Ain't Gonna Rain On Nobody's Parade But Mine", written by Harvey Scales, and performed by The Dramatics.
- "Still Got Love for You" contains a sample of "Ike's Mood I", written and performed by Isaac Hayes.
- "What Your Life Like 2" contains a sample of "Quasimodo's Marriage", written by Alec R. Costandinos and Michael Jouveaux, and performed by Alec R. Costandinos and The Syncophonic Orchestra.

== Personnel ==
- Kamel Abdo – engineer (1), assistant engineer (5, 7, 8, 10, 14), mixing (10), assistant mix engineer (13)
- Tony Dawsey – mastering
- DJ Scratch – scratching (3)
- Just Blaze – mixing (12, 13), scratching (4)
- Kareem "Biggs" Burke – executive producer
- Shawn Carter – executive producer
- Damon Dash – executive producer
- Supa Engineer DURO – mixing (2)
- Jason Goldstein – mixing (13)
- Kyambo "Hip-Hop" Joshua – co-executive producer
- Gimel "Young Guru" Keaton – engineer (1–14), mixing (12)
- Jonathan Mannion – photography
- Midnite – assistant engineer (4, 6, 9, 12)
- Saint Nick – additional vocals (8)
- Joe "Chef" Quinde – mixing (3, 7–9)
- Beanie Sigel – co-executive producer
- Tony Vanias – recording coordinator
- Doug Wilson – mixing (1, 4–6, 10, 11, 14)
- Shane "Bermy" Woodley – assistant engineer (2, 3, 11)

== Charts ==
=== Weekly charts ===
Chart (2001)	Peak position
US Billboard 200	5
US Top R&B/Hip-Hop Albums (Billboard)	2

=== Year-end charts ===
Chart (2001)	Position
US Billboard 200	189
US Top R&B/Hip-Hop Albums (Billboard)	56

== Singles chart positions ==
Year	Song	Chart positions		
Year	Song	Billboard Hot 100	Hot R&B/Hip-Hop Singles & Tracks	Hot Rap Singles
2001	"Beanie (Mack Bitch)"	—	52	11
2001	"Think It's a Game"	—	99	—
