= Fade to Black (2004 film) =

Documentary about rapper Jay-Z

- Theatrical release poster
- Directed by: Patrick Paulson; Michael John Warren
- Produced by: Bob Ezrin; Rich Kleiman; Justin Wilkes
- Starring: Jay-Z; Beyoncé
- Cinematography: Paul Bozymowksi; Scott Lochmus; Luke McCoubrey; Theron "Tee Smif" Smith
- Edited by: Jimmy Helton; Jonah Moran; Ron Pantane; Adam Zuckerman
- Production companies: @radical.media Marcy Projects; Roc-A-Fella Records
- Distributed by: Paramount Classics
- Release date: November 5, 2004
- Running time: 109 minutes
- Country: United States
- Language: English

Fade to Black is a 2004 documentary film about the career of American rapper Jay-Z. It also features many other famous names in hip hop music. This live concert at Madison Square Garden on November 25, 2003 was meant to be Jay-Z's final performance, as he announced his intentions to retire from the industry.

Fade to Black runs through some of the major parts of Jay-Z's Madison Square Garden performance while cutting to Jay-Z and his exploits, as well as insights into the making of The Black Album.

== Cast ==
The following musicians are credited with an appearance in the film:

- Jay-Z
- Mary J. Blige
- Foxy Brown
- Diddy
- Damon Dash
- Missy Elliott
- R. Kelly
- Beyoncé
- Usher
