= State Property 2 =

2005 film directed by Damon Dash

- Theatrical release poster
- Directed by: Damon Dash
- Written by: Adam Moreno; Damon Dash
- Based on: Characters created by Abdul Malik Abbott and Ernest "Tron" Anderson
- Produced by: Damon Dash
- Starring: Beanie Sigel; N.O.R.E; Damon Dash; Omillio Sparks; DJ Clue? Roselyn Sanchez; Juelz Santana; Winky Wright; Cam'ron; Kanye West; Ol' Dirty Bastard
- Cinematography: Tom Houghton
- Edited by: Gary Levy
- Music by: Kerry Muzzey; Beanie Sigel
- Production company: Dash Films
- Distributed by: Lions Gate Films
- Release date: April 13, 2005
- Running time: 94 Minutes
- Country: United States
- Language: English
- Budget: $2 million
- Box office: $1.6 million

State Property 2 is a 2005 American crime film directed by Damon Dash and produced and distributed by Lionsgate Entertainment. A sequel to 2002's State Property, the film stars rap artists and other musicians such as The Diplomats, Beanie Sigel, N.O.R.E., Kanye West, Mariah Carey and others. Championship boxers Bernard Hopkins and Winky Wright appear in cameo roles. Dash directed the film and co-created its story with Adam Moreno, who wrote the screenplay. The film marks the final appearance of Ol' Dirty Bastard, who died in 2004.

== Plot ==
Beans, an inmate in prison and head of the ABM gang, writes a letter from prison, expressing his hatred and telling someone that if they're reading it, he is now free. He then recaps the first film. One night, Beans is arrested for drug trafficking and attempted murder of drug runner C-Zer. The night before his trial, he sends ABM members D-Nice and Baby Boy to intimidate C-Zer’s mother. Despite C-Zer’s perjury, Beans is convicted and sentenced to 15–30 years.

In prison, Beans meets his cellmate Free, a drug dealer who had partnered with another dealer, El Pollo Loco. Their stash house, the Botanica bodega, was raided, leading to their arrests. Beans reunites with ABM soldier P-Nut, and learns from D-Nice that the gang is struggling without him and lost their supplier due to Baby Boy’s arrogance. A fellow inmate steals Beans’ sneakers, prompting P-Nut to suggest he speak to Free, who can connect him to Loco, a potential supplier, and a shiv. Beans kills the thief, and both he and Loco are questioned but released after remaining silent.

Loco shares his backstory: He's from South Beach, the son of drug kingpin parents, raised by their bodyguard Biggis after his parents were killed. Biggis introduces him to “El Plaga,” an unseen powerful drug lord, and Loco begins selling drugs. Missy, his mistress, tips him off that she informed police of his operations, leading to Loco’s arrest.

Beans and Loco form an alliance. After securing parole, Loco tests the ABM’s loyalty by sending Baby Boy to retrieve a drug package from a diner guarded by the M.O.P. Baby Boy survives the ensuing shootout and succeeds. Loco and Biggis instruct the ABM to sell the product in two weeks and collect $90,000. Meanwhile, Loco and Biggis then meet Beans’ rival Dame, leader of the Umbrella gang, which includes crews M.O.P. and The Diplomats.

The ABM sells the product, but The Diplomats rob them of the $90,000. Beans learns of the robbery from prison and attempts to warn Loco, who rejects the call, sparking a feud. Beans is released early when it is revealed that the judge and prosecutor accepted bribes. When he comes home, Beans discovers that the drugs that the ABM were selling from the diner belonged to Dame, and that Loco has been manipulating him

At a club, Dame discovers his driver shot dead and finds Beans’ letter. Dame confronts Beans, who denies writing it but tells Dame that Loco and El Plaga are the same, claiming Loco manipulated both gangs to fuel their rivalry and eliminate competition. It is revealed that Biggis orchestrated with Dame ABM's robbery to curry favor with Loco. Both crews are supposed to meet Loco at the bodega the following morning.

The next morning, Biggis and Loco arrive at the Botanica. Beans and the ABM initiate a shootout with Loco, with the Umbrella joining against Loco and Biggis. Dame and Beans dismiss their crews and confront Loco and Biggis. During the standoff, Beans—still believing Loco is El Plaga—hints at the plan to have the gangs eliminate each other, which Loco is unaware of, prompting him to question Biggis. Loco realizes Biggis is El Plaga, the mastermind behind much of the chaos: he tipped off police about the Botanica raid, forced Missy to mislead Loco to think she gave the tip, arranged the theft of Beans’ shoes to set up the meeting between Loco and Beans, shot Dame’s driver, wrote the letter, and killed Loco’s parents. Loco kills Biggis and leaves.

Beans and Dame exit together. The film ends as Beans receives a call from member Neef about throwing Dame a “surprise party,” with Beans looking at the camera.

== Cast ==
- Beanie Sigel as Beans
- N.O.R.E. as El Pollo Loco
- Damon Dash as Dame
- Michael Bentt as Biggis/El Plaga
- Omillio Sparks as Baby Boy
- Oschino as D-Nice
- Freeway as Free
- Young Gunz as Chris & Neef
- Cam'ron as himself
- Juelz Santana as Juelz Suarez
- Jimmy Jones as himself
- Duan Grant as P-Nut
- Sundy Carter as Aisha
- Nicole Wray as herself
- Kanye West as himself
- Mariah Carey as Professionally Dressed Woman
- 'Fame' Jamal Grinnage MOP as himself
- 'Billy' MOP as himself
- Ol' Dirty Bastard as Dirt McGirt
- 'Fox' MOP as herself
- Loon as El Pollo Loco's father
- Angie Martinez as Missy (Tuesday Night)
- Omahyra Mota as El Pollo Loco's mother
- Roselyn Sánchez as District Attorney (D.A.)
- Bernard Hopkins as O.G.

== Production ==
The movie was filmed in 2004.

== Reception ==
State Property 2 received negative reviews from critics but was an improvement to its prequel generating only 14% from Rotten Tomatoes from 14 reviews. It also received 33% from Metacritic based on 10 reviews.

== See also ==
- List of hood films
