= State Property (film) =

2002 film directed by Abdul Malik Abbott

- Theatrical release poster
- Directed by: Abdul Malik Abbott
- Written by: Abdul Malik Abbott; Ernest "Tron" Anderson
- Produced by: Damon Dash; Phyllis Cedar
- Starring: Beanie Sigel; Jay-Z; Damon Dash; Memphis Bleek; Omillio Sparks
- Cinematography: David Daniel
- Edited by: Paul Frank; Tim French; Justine Harari
- Music by: Abdul Malik Abbott; Evan Eder; Gregory Darryl Smith
- Production company: Roc-A-Fella Films
- Distributed by: Lionsgate
- Release date: January 18, 2002
- Running time: 88 minutes
- Language: English
- Budget: $600,000
- Box office: $2.1 million

State Property is a 2002 American crime film starring Beanie Sigel, Memphis Bleek, Damon Dash and Jay-Z. It was produced by Jay-Z's Roc-A-Fella and distributed by Lions Gate Films. Abdul Malik Abbott directed the film and co-wrote its screenplay with Ernest "Tron" Anderson. The film was loosely based on Aaron Jones and the Junior Black Mafia (JBM), who participated in Philadelphia's drug trade from the late 1980s to early 1990s. Film critic reviews were generally mixed to negative. It was followed by a sequel, State Property 2 which was released in 2005.

== Plot ==
Frustrated with being broke, Beans (Sigel) decides that the only way to achieve the American Dream is to seize it. The film follows Beans and his crew, the ABM, as they take over the city of Philadelphia, creating mayhem as their empire builds.

Beans struggles to maintain his family life while bumping heads with opposing gangsters and police. It all comes to a head when he cannot surpass the city's most notorious crew, run by Untouchable J (Jay-Z) and Dame (Dash). The moves Beans and the ABM decide to make come with severe consequences.

== Cast ==
- Beanie Sigel as Beans
- Omillio Sparks as Baby Boy
- Memphis Bleek as Blizz
- Damon Dash as 'Boss' Dame
- Sundy Carter as Aisha
- Tyran "Ty-Ty" Smith as Shareef
- Oschino as D-Nice
- Jay-Z as Untouchable J
- Brother Newz as P-Nut
- Rell as Butter
- Young Chris as Ricky
- Neef Buck as Troy
- Amil as Boss' Assassin
- DJ Clue as Boss Informant
- Jacob the Jeweler as Eli
- Denyce Lawton as Bikini Girl #2
- Casha as Heather McGee
- Randolph Curtis Rand as Saul Weisberg
- Nicole Madeo as Leslie Tucci
- Leslie Pilgrim as Aja
- Kyndra Monet as Selena
- Pain in da Ass as Mario
- Dee Lee as Poochie
- Leah Leatherbury as Tonya
- Reb as Snoop
- Rashie Constantine as Mel
- Stephen "X" Baker as Bruce
- Willie Esco as Papi Wil
- Cousin Ervan as E
- Andrea Videla as Nina
- Natasha Byam as girl speaking to Amil on stoop (Stoop scene)

== Production ==
Filmed in 2000, the film was originally titled Get Down or Lay Down and was developed as part of a joint deal between Roc-A-Fella Films and Miramax. Additionally, Amil's character was originally named Tonya before she was ultimately cast as Boss's Assassin. However, by the time of its January 2002 release, distribution had shifted from Miramax to Lionsgate, and the film was retitled State Property. Principal photography took place in Jersey City, New Jersey, Paterson, New Jersey, and Philadelphia, Pennsylvania.

== Soundtrack ==
The State Property soundtrack was entirely performed by the State Property rap group. It was released on January 29, 2002, and peaked at 14 on Billboard 200 and 1 on the Top R&B/Hip-Hop Albums.

== Reception ==
On Rotten Tomatoes, the film has an approval rating of 0% based on 12 reviews. Metacritic, which uses a weighted average, assigned the film a score of 9 out of 100, based on 8 critics, indicating "overwhelming dislike". TV Guide gave the film 2 out of 4 stars, stating "Formulaic but performed with some verve". The New York Times wrote, "In spite of all the sex and violence, 'State Property' is a remarkably tedious film. The story is sluggishly told, and Beans and his crew, including Omillio Sparks, are too gloweringly one-dimensional to be interesting."

== Sequel ==
A sequel to the film, titled State Property 2, was released on April 13, 2005.

== See also ==
- List of hood films
