= State Property (group) =

American hip hop group

- Origin: Philadelphia, Pennsylvania, U.S.
- Genres: East Coast hip-hop; gangsta rap
- Years active: 2002–present
- Labels: Roc-A-Fella; Def Jam
- Members: Beanie Sigel; Freeway; Peedi Crakk; Young Gunz; Omillio Sparks; Oschino Vasquez

State Property is a hip hop group and collective from Philadelphia, Pennsylvania, led by rapper Beanie Sigel with fellow Philadelphia rappers Freeway, Peedi Crakk, Oschino Vasquez, and Omillio Sparks, and the duo Young Gunz (Young Chris and Neef Buck). Formed in 2000, they signed with Jay-Z's Roc-A-Fella Records to release two studio albums: their self-titled debut album (2002) and The Chain Gang Vol. 2 (2003), both of which saw critical and commercial success. The former album accompanied the namesake film in which the group starred, while its sequel was released in 2005 and mainly starred Sigel. Each member was dropped from the label in late 2007, leaving the future of the group in question.

== Background ==
The group's first release was the State Property soundtrack in January 2002, which served as both the soundtrack to accompanying film released that same month and the group's debut album.

After group head Beanie Sigel's incarceration in 2004, his relationship with the State Property camp went sour. Beanie criticized that the rest of State Property was not showing him support while he was in jail, saying no one except Oschino from his group came to visit him. When the Roc-A-Fella split occurred, he also made the decision to move State Property to Damon Dash's namesake record label, however the rest of the group opted to stay on Roc-A-Fella instead. Upon his release, Sigel released the album The B. Coming (2005).

Through Dame, Beanie declared State Property disbanded until further notice. In response, several members of the group began saying they never chose to be in the group and that they wouldn't have needed it to sell records. However, solo mixtapes by the group's members often feature their State Property cohorts. "State Property" is also the name of a clothing line bearing their group insignia, which was run by Sigel as a subsidiary of Rocawear.

== Discography ==
=== Studio albums ===
Year	Album	Chart positions	
Year	Album	U.S.	U.S. R&B
2002	State Property OST: Released: January 29, 2002; Label: Roc-A-Fella, Def Jam	14	1
2003	The Chain Gang Vol. 2: Released: August 12, 2003; Label: Roc-A-Fella, Def Jam	6	1

=== Singles ===
Year	Song	Chart positions			Album
Year	Song	U.S. Hot 100	U.S. R&B	U.S. Rap	Album
2002	"Roc the Mic"	55	16	6	State Property OST

=== Mixtapes ===
- The Lost Files (2005)
- Gang's All Here (2006)
- Out on Bail (2007)
- The Return of State Property (2011)
- The Chain Gang Vol. 3 (2019)

== Filmography ==
- State Property (2002)
- State Property 2 (2005)
