= Rell (singer) =

American singer and songwriter from South Carolina

- Born: July 22, 1976 (age 50)
- Origin: Bowman, South Carolina, U.S.
- Genres: R&B; hip hop; soul
- Occupations: Singer; songwriter; backing vocalist
- Years active: 1997–present
- Labels: Roc-A-Fella; Elektra; Def Jam; Atlantic; Dame Dash Music Group; Top Ten

Wilbur Gerrell Gaddis (born July 22, 1976), better known by his stage name Rell, is an American R&B singer and songwriter from Bowman, South Carolina. He was the first male R&B singer to sign to New York City-based label Roc-A-Fella Records, where he recorded with artists such as Kanye West, Jay-Z, Consequence, and Young Gunz.

== Life and career ==
Rell grew up in Bowman, and is a former South Carolina State University pre-med student. He signed to Roc-A-Fella Records in 1997, and began work on his debut album which was tentatively titled, Medicine. Rell got his break in 1998, appearing in Jay-Z's rap cult flick Streets Is Watching and contributing the club banger "Love for Free" to the movie's soundtrack and would later be featured on his debut album. Within the latter part of 1998, Rell renamed his debut, The Remedy, and re-released, "Love for Free" as the lead single. In 1999, two other singles ("When Will U See" and "Darlin'") were released as radio buzz singles for the album, however, within the first quarter of that year, The Remedy was shelved due to the failed charting of his album's singles. Still signed to the Roc, Rell went on to sing hooks for nearly every Roc-a-Fella MC since, including Freeway's "Victim of the Ghetto" and appearing on "The Message" featuring Mary J. Blige, from Dr. Dre's 2001.

In 2001, Rell met agreeable terms with Jay-Z, and began retooling for his cancelled debut, The Remedy. The project spawned a new and official lead single titled, "If That's My Baby". While the album was scheduled for a September release, after the release of another single, "It's Obvious", the album was slated to be released in spring 2002. In early 2002, yet again the expected reworked version of The Remedy was shelved. However, in June 2025, The Remedy was officially released to digital and streaming services.

In 2004, Rell began work on yet another project, titled Long Time Coming. In promotion of the album, Rell released several leftover tracks from his cancelled project The Remedy on numerous mixtapes and limited Roc-a-Fella EP samplers. Rell eventually released "Real Love" as the lead single for Long Time Coming in 2005. However, in the midst of the release, Rell was moved from the Roc label to Dame Dash Music Group. Under the new label, Long Time Coming was to be released in May 2006. Unfortunately disagreements and lack of promotion from the new label ended up shelving Rell's album and he initially split from the label.

In 2007, collaborations with Latin reggaeton artists Don Omar and Zion saw releases. Rell wrote the title track for Usher's 2008 album Here I Stand. Also in 2008, Rell partnered with Nate Pitts, CEO of Right Arm Music Group, the Charlotte-based indie record label which is the home for producers Dale Williams, Shabbykat Production and Dark Sun Production.

In 2009, Rell teamed with Tre Williams to form The Revelations. They released their debut album, The Bleeding Edge, on October 6, 2009.

In 2011, Rell wrote "Love Contract" on Musiq Soulchild's album, MusiqInTheMagiq.

== Personal life ==
After stepping away from music, Gaines worked as a behavioral technician, as well as drove box trucks and loaded warehouses. He also is married.

== Discography ==
=== Albums ===
- The Remedy (2001) (Unreleased), (2025, Released as Rell Presents The Remedy Album)
- Long Time Coming (2006) (Unreleased)

=== Singles ===
- 1997: "Ghetto Stash"
- 1998: "Love for Free" (feat. Jay-Z)
- 1999: "When Will You See" (feat. Amil)
- 2001: "If That's My Baby"
- 2001: "It's Obvious" (feat. Jay-Z)
- 2004: "No Better Love" (Remix)^{1}
- 2004: "Real Love" (feat. Kanye West & Consequence)
- 2008: "Swagga"

^{1} The song was to be released on Rell's first version of The Remedy but was re-recorded for Young Gunz and a possible track for Rell's other unreleased project, Long Time Coming.

=== Guest Croons ===
- 1999: "The Message" [Dr. Dre, Mary J Blige]
- 2000: "There's Nothin' Better" [Memphis Bleek, Beanie Sigel]
- 2000: "Darlin'" [DJ Clue]
- 2001: "Still Got Love for You" [Beanie Sigel, Jay-Z]
- 2002: "International Hustler"; "Don't Realize" [Freeway; Beanie Sigel]
- 2002: "You Know What I Want" [Paid in Full Cam'ron]
- 2002: As One [Jay-Z]
- 2003: "Victim of the Ghetto" [Freeway]
- 2003: "Understand Me Still"; "Do It All Again" [Memphis Bleek]
- 2004: "No Better Love" [Young Gunz]
- 2004: "Hold Dat" [Prince Po]
- 2004: "Wanna Ride" [Jim Jones]
- 2004: "You Know" [AZ]
- 2005: "Change" [Beanie Sigel, Melissa Jay]
- 2005: "Swimmin' with Sharks" [Cuban Link]
- 2005: "Could It Be" [Tweet]
- 2007: "Damn I Miss the Game" [Cassidy]
- 2007: "Calm My Nerves" [Don Omar]
- 2008: "That's What I'm Talking 'Bout" [Pete Rock]
- 2009: "Mysterious" [Kurious]
- 2009: "I See Dead People" [Grand Puba]
- 2009: "What I Wanna Be" [M.O.P.]
- 2009: "Rain" [Jim Jones, Noe]
- 2010: "Men of Respect" [DJ Kay Slay, Jim Jones, Tony Yayo, Papoose]
- 2011: "let Me Fly" [Jim Jones]
- 2014: "Blurred Pupil" [Illa Ghee]
- 2014: "here I Go Again" [Ghostface Killah]
- 2017: "Cold Summer" [DJ Kay Slay, Kendrick Lamar, Mac Miller, Kevin Gates]
- 2024: "MY BURNER" [Nell]

== Filmography ==
- 1998: Streets Is Watching
- 2002: State Property
- 2003: Death of a Dynasty
- 2010: Code Blue
