= Roc-A-Fella Records =

American hip hop record label

- Parent company: Universal Music Group
- Founded: 1994; 32 years ago
- Founder: Shawn "Jay-Z" Carter; Damon "Dame" Dash; Kareem "Biggs" Burke
- Defunct: 2013; 13 years ago
- Status: Defunct
- Distributors: Priority (Reasonable Doubt); Def Jam (United States); Mercury (United Kingdom)
- Genre: Hip hop
- Country of origin: United States
- Location: New York City, New York

Roc-A-Fella Records was an American record label and music management company founded in 1994 by record executives and entrepreneurs Damon Dash, Shawn "Jay-Z" Carter, and Kareem "Biggs" Burke. Carter issued his debut album, Reasonable Doubt (1996), as the label's first release, in a joint venture with Priority Records. The label signed and released albums for acts including Kanye West, Memphis Bleek, Jadakiss, DJ Clue?, State Property, and The Diplomats before its dissolution in 2013. Key producers for the label were Kanye West and Just Blaze.

== History ==
=== 1994–2000: Formation and early years ===
Roc-A-Fella Records was founded in 1994. After Shawn "Jay-Z" Carter had been rejected by major record labels, it began as an independent outlet for the rapper's debut album. Carter, Damon Dash and Kareem Burke started the label through Priority Records, using finances from Payday Records due to their singles-only deal. The name "Roc-A-Fella" was conceived by rapper Tone Hooker as a double entendre for Rockefeller and a rapper dominating his opponent ("rocking a fella"). Though Reasonable Doubt (1996) didn't earn immediate commercial success, it spawned successful singles and earned Jay-Z regional popularity in hip hop. Starting out as Roc-A-Fella's only artist, Jay-Z was supported by the Notorious B.I.G.'s producer DJ Clark Kent and Camp Lo's producer DJ Ski; affiliated rappers, Sauce Money, Jaz-O, and a young Memphis Bleek, though only Memphis Bleek would eventually sign with the label in 1996. By this time, Roc-A-Fella's headquarters were located at 17 John Street in Lower Manhattan.

In June 1997, Roc-A-Fella agreed to a 50/50 partnership and distribution deal with Def Jam Recordings. In November 1997, Roc-A-Fella released their first two albums under Def Jam's distribution, Jay-Z's sophomore album, In My Lifetime, Vol. 1, as well as R&B duo Christión's debut and only album for the label, Ghetto Cyrano, on the same day. Roc-A-Fella and Jay-Z saw increasing popularity, mainly due to a high-profile appearance by Jay on The Notorious B.I.G.'s posthumous Life After Death, complete with Roc-A-Fella and Damon Dash references. While Memphis Bleek signed with Roc-A-Fella, Sauce Money chose to pursue a deal with Priority, and Jaz-O refrained from signing anywhere and provided production for only one song on In My Lifetime, Vol. 1, "Rap Game/Crack Game." Despite Jaz-O not signing to Roc-A-Fella, he became Memphis Bleek's manager. In 1998, Roc-A-Fella Records released the movie Streets Is Watching and the accompanying soundtrack; the film compiles various Jay-Z videos into a continuous story, and the album introduced more affiliated, later Roc-A-Fella Records acts like Noreaga, M.O.P., and DJ Clue, as well as producer Irv Gotti and the short-lived group, Murder Inc. (namesake of Irv's record label, Murder Inc.).

Jay's 1998 album, Vol. 2... Hard Knock Life, saw him largely depart from his previous entourage and venture forth with producers Swizz Beatz, Timbaland, The 45 King and Jermaine Dupri. Vol. 2 spawned his first major hit, "Hard Knock Life", and became the label's first Platinum-RIAA certified release; it was the last Roc-A-Fella release to see appearances by Jaz-O or Sauce Money, and the first to feature new Roc artists Beanie Sigel and Amil. The label closed out 1998 with the December release of DJ Clue's debut album, The Professional, which saw guest appearances from Jay-Z, Memphis Bleek, and an appearance from later Roc-A-Fella artist Cam'Ron. The album was certified platinum by the RIAA, making DJ Clue the first act other than Jay-Z on the label to achieve platinum status. Meanwhile, DJ Ski had, at the time, formed the production company Roc-A-Blok, although the company folded when Ski moved out of New York to take a break from music.

In August 1999, Memphis Bleek released his debut album Coming of Age through Roc-A-Fella. The album was executive produced by Kareem "Biggs" Burke, Damon Dash, and Jay-Z, and featured guest appearances from Roc-A-Fella artists Beanie Sigel and Jay-Z, as well as Dark Half and Da Ranjahz, who were signed to the label's subsidiary, The Carter Foundation. Despite their contributions, both Dark Half and Da Ranjahz eventually parted ways with The Carter Foundation. While Coming of Age didn’t reach the same level of success as Jay-Z’s albums, it achieved Gold status in the U.S., driven by the single "What You Think of That" featuring Jay-Z. Jay-Z's 1999 album Vol. 3... Life and Times of S. Carter continued Jay's new affiliations with then-popular producers; in 2000, the label saw a redefinition in both sound and roster. Jay-Z put out The Dynasty: Roc La Familia as a solo album. Originally intended to be a collaboration project, it nonetheless featured heavy appearances by Beanie Sigel, Amil, and Memphis Bleek, along with a Philly rapper Freeway guest spot that led to him being signed to Roc-A-Fella. Rather than return to Timbaland or Swizz Beatz for production, Jay selected beats from a new crop of producers: Kanye West, Bink, The Neptunes and Just Blaze. Each beat-smith would go on to become consistently involved in future Roc-A-Fella projects.

=== 2000–2005: Prominence and split ===
The new decade saw Roc-A-Fella begin to expand beyond one figurehead artist. Although Jay-Z remained the label's prominent image—with the acclaimed release of The Blueprint and the closing of his trial for the 1999 stabbing of producer Lance Rivera—other Roc artists began to gain popularity and acceptance. In 2000, Beanie Sigel released The Truth and reached #5 on the Billboard charts, DJ Clue released The Professional 2, and Memphis Bleek released The Understanding. Although Clue and Beans's albums hit the top five on the Billboard charts, Bleek's album was in the top twenty. Nonetheless, all three albums were certified Gold by the RIAA. Amil's album, however, had lackluster sales. Jay-Z and Damon Dash began signing up new talent, including Freeway, and several young Philadelphia rappers that were later compiled into the Freeway/Sigel-led group, State Property. During this time, Jay-Z and Beanie Sigel were embroiled in a feud with Ruff Ryders artists Jadakiss and DMX. Disses back and forth between Jay-Z and Jadakiss implied a conflict between Jay and former groupmate DMX, led to a full-on war of words between Sigel and Kiss, and eventually culminated in a diss by Beanie Sigel over Jada's hit "Put Your Hands Up," after which the rivalry faded. On December 4, 2001 (Jay-Z's 32nd birthday), it was announced and confirmed that rapper Cam'ron had signed to Roc-A-Fella through his connection with Damon Dash. After Cam'ron was signed, his rap group The Diplomats as well as Diplomats members Juelz Santana and Jimmy Jones also signed to Roc-A-Fella as well.

In January 2002, Roc-A-Fella released the film, State Property. It starred Roc-A-Fella acts Damon Dash, Jay-Z, Beanie Sigel, Rell, Memphis Bleek, and DJ Clue. The title of became the namesake for both the Philadelphia based State Property and Rocawear's subsidiary clothing line. Upon signing to Roc-A-Fella, Cam'ron reached a new commercial peak. In May, Cam'ron released his Roc-A-Fella debut Come Home With Me. The album featured guest appearances from Roc-A-Fella artists Jimmy Jones, Juelz Santana, Beanie Sigel, Memphis Bleek, and Jay-Z, and featured production from Roc-A-Fella's in house producers Just Blaze and Kanye West. It featured the moderately successful single "Daydreaming". The album was certified Platinum by the RIAA for selling over a million copies in America. By 2002, tensions between Jay-Z and Dash had become increasingly apparent. While Jay-Z was vacationing in Europe that July, Dash publicly announced the promotion of Cam'ron and Beanie Sigel to vice president positions within the company, a move that Jay-Z publicly described as premature. Around the same time, Dash began production on a film based on Roc-A-Fella without first consulting Jay-Z and fired several Roc-A-Fella employees, including Jay-Z's longtime assistant Carline Balan and the company's chief financial officer, John Meneilly. The incidents reflected growing disagreements over Dash's increasingly unilateral management of the company and contributed to the deterioration of the partners' relationship. From 2002 to 2003, Damon Dash signed several artists in response to Jay-Z's talk of retirement after his 2002 album The Blueprint^{2}: The Gift & The Curse. He signed M.O.P. and Ol' Dirty Bastard and attempted to sign Twista and Joe Budden. Twista never signed to Roc-A-Fella due to his deal with Atlantic Records. Roc-A-Fella experienced its height in product releases and overall popularity as a brand name during this period.

On March 25, 2003, Roc-A-Fella released The Diplomats' debut album Diplomatic Immunity. Despite not producing any major hits, the success of the singles Built This City and Dipset Anthem led to the album being certified Gold by the RIAA. In late 2003, the company released Jay-Z's alleged final album, The Black Album.

In January 2004, Jay-Z entered talks with Island Def Jam to launch his own entertainment company, separate from Roc-A-Fella. The move sparked speculation about friction between him and Dash, fueled by concerns over Dash’s growing media presence and his push to expand Roc-A-Fella into film—a direction Jay-Z reportedly opposed. However, both parties publicly denied any conflict at the time. After Jay-Z's supposed last hurrah, Dash, poised to take greater control in the company, began heavily promoting artists Cam'ron, The Diplomats, State Property, Kanye West, and Twista.

In 2004, Kanye West's album, The College Dropout, became a huge commercial and critical success, selling multi-Platinum-RIAA certified sales, and Foxy Brown was signed and began work on her album, Black Rose. In December 2004, Jay-Z and Damon Dash met at Da Silvano in New York to discuss Def Jam's offer to acquire Roc-A-Fella and Jay-Z's appointment as president of the label. According to Dash, he supported Jay-Z accepting the position but wanted the Roc-A-Fella name to remain separate from the deal. Jay-Z reportedly offered Dash the opportunity to retain the name in exchange for giving up ownership of the master recordings to Reasonable Doubt, but Dash declined. The disagreement became one of the final disputes between the two co-founders, whose partnership had already been strained by disagreements over Roc-A-Fella's direction and their relationship with Def Jam. After Jay-Z's supposed last hurrah, it was announced and confirmed in December 2004 that The Island Def Jam Music Group purchased the remaining 50 percent stake of Roc-A-Fella Records that IDJ didn't already own, and named Jay-Z as president/CEO of Def Jam. The infamous 'split' between Dash, Carter, and Burke occurred when it was revealed the trio had sold their 50% interest in Roc-A-Fella to The Island Def Jam Music Group, making the label full owners. As President, Carter retained control of the Roc and his masters, ousting his 2 former partners. He later explained that he had offered to turn down the position and ownership for the masters to Reasonable Doubt alone:

So I was like, let me get Reasonable Doubt and I'll give up [the rest of] my masters. I'll give up Roc-A-Fella, I'll give up president and CEO of Def Jam—everything. Just give me my baby to hold on to so 10 years down the line, I can look back and I got something—I'm not empty-handed. And I was the 1 being offered everything. I thought it was more than fair ... And when that was turned down, I had to make a choice. I'll leave that for the people to say what choice they would've made. That's about it. I don't really wanna talk about Dame or Biggs. I don't have nothing negative to say about them.

— Jay-Z, XXL

As Dash and Burke set up their own fledgling record label, originally called Roc4life and later rechristened to Dame Dash Music Group, each artist was offered their choice of labels. Memphis Bleek and Kanye West remained on Roc-A-Fella. Jimmy Jones and The Diplomats opted to leave Roc-A-Fella in 2004.

Beanie Sigel, then doing a year's incarceration on an attempted murder charge, put out his album The B. Coming on Dame Dash and Roc-A-Fella; this was accompanied by accusations from Dash that of all the members of State Property, only Oschino had gone to visit Sigel in prison. Beanie had initially chosen Dame Dash Music Group, and he wanted to bring the rest of State Property over to Dame Dash. However, the rest of the group refused, preferring to remain on Roc-A-Fella; in response, Beanie Sigel effectively put the group on hold, claiming disappointment in his groupmates. M.O.P. also left Roc-A-Fella for Dame Dash Music Group, though they parted ways with Dash soon thereafter. Due to the 2004 death of Ol' Dirty Bastard, Dash also brought with him masters of the rapper's project and promises to release the album, A Son Unique, though this never occurred. On April 28, 2005, Cam'ron left Roc-A-Fella and Def Jam and signed to Warner Music Group under the Asylum Records imprint. Cam'ron was especially vocal in running a smear campaign against Jay-Z, claiming Jay-Z blocked him from an executive position Dash had offered him at Roc-A-Fella.

Memphis Bleek and Kanye West released 534 and Late Registration, respectively, in 2005, along with the Young Gunz' sophomore effort and Teairra Marí's debut, though only Kanye West's project saw significant sales. It was stated by Memphis Bleek that Cory Gunz had signed, but nothing materialized. In May 2005, the Damon Dash Music Group's deal with Island Def Jam collapsed just three months after its launch. The split came amid Dash’s demands for increased marketing funds and a larger executive role, which strained relations with Def Jam executives. Additionally, Dash grew tired of Jay-Z, now president of Def Jam, overseeing his projects. Dame Dash Music Group subsequently left Def Jam and by 2007 was dissolved.

=== 2006–2009: Roc Redefinition and departure of Jay-Z ===
In 2006, releases were largely limited to those of Roc-La-Familia, a Latino-geared label under Roc-A-Fella that followed the trend of reggaeton. Héctor el Father and N.O.R.E. both put out albums, and the label was home to New York rapper Tru Life, but has since folded. Jay-Z made his return that year with Kingdom Come, to mixed reviews. He stepped down from his Def Jam position and put out a second album in 2007, American Gangster, to more positive reviews and sales, along with Kanye West's Graduation, Beanie Sigel's The Solution, and Freeway's Free at Last; Kanye West's album sold multi-platinum to rave reviews. Freeway's project received acclaim but not major sales, and contained comments aimed at Kanye West and Just Blaze for not supplying production. He later amended his comments, stating he desired to work with Just Blaze but the producer hasn't reached out. This may have been due to Just Blaze's work on American Gangster and complications regarding his Atlantic-distributed label, Fort Knocks, and his artist Saigon.

The signing of Ruff Ryders artist Jadakiss, former rival to both Jay-Z and Beanie Sigel, also came in 2007, as did Uncle Murda. Foxy Brown was dropped from the label after 2 years, in light of a jail sentence. Though Young Chris and Peedi Crakk continued to appear on projects, neither seemed any closer to solo projects, and in 2008 Peedi Crakk announced that State Property had been dropped from the label. This was countered by Beanie Sigel's manager, who confirmed that Beanie Sigel and Freeway were still part of Roc-A-Fella, though Beanie Sigel would later leave that year. Young Chris also apparently signed as a solo artist. 2008 saw only the release of Kanye West's 808s & Heartbreak, garnering decent sales. It also brought repeated disses in songs and interviews from Peedi Crakk towards Jay-Z, claiming he held up his project on purpose, though he claims to have moved on. During that year, Jay-Z had signed a $150 million deal with Live Nation that included concerts, endorsements and recordings, and included a platform for him to launch his Roc Nation label. Uncle Murda left the label after a year and a half with no release, citing lack of executive interest after Jay-Z left Def Jam.

In March 2009, Freeway procured his release from Def Jam, claiming a need to explore his options; shortly, he announced his signing to Ca$h Money, while stating he would always respect Roc-A-Fella. Longtime signee Memphis Bleek also reported his departure from Def Jam, deciding not to travel to Roc Nation in favor of starting his own record label, but he is still very close with Roc-A-Fella. Additionally, Tru Life has been referred to as a "1 time [or past] affiliate" of Roc-A-Fella upon his turning himself in to authorities for his connection to a retaliatory stabbing. On May 21, 2009, Jay-Z had bought back his contract from Def Jam for an unprecedented $5,000,000 and started his deal with Live Nation.

=== 2010–2013: Final years and TufAmerica vs. Roc-A-Fella ===
Jadakiss briefly moved to Roc-A-Fella and released an album The Last Kiss before reuniting with Ruff Ryders. On May 3, 2010, Damon Dash relaunched Roc-A-Fella after nearly a year of inactivity with his 1st artist being former Young Money rapper Curren$y. Curren$y's third album, Pilot Talk, was to be released under the newly relaunched Roc-A-Fella. However, Curren$y stated in interviews with both XXL and Complex that the album would be released under Damon Dash's DD172 record label division, BluRoc Records and distributed through Def Jam. On August 8, 2011, Jay-Z and Kanye West released a collaborative album titled Watch the Throne. It was later revealed that Jay-Z was part of a short-lived relaunched Roc-A-Fella, as the album was released on Roc-A-Fella, Roc Nation, and Def Jam.

In September 2012, record label Tuff City, via its subsidiary TufAmerica, filed a lawsuit on the grounds of copyright infringement by Roc-A-Fella, seeking undisclosed damages. The complaint filed in federal court in Manhattan claims Roc-A-Fella and their parent Island Def Jam paid them a $62,500 license fee to sample Eddie Bo's "Hook and Sling, Part 1" in Kanye West's "Who Will Survive in America" and "Lost in the World". Despite this, Tuff City says UMG and Roc-A-Fella "failed and refused to enter into written license agreements that accounted for their multiple other uses of 'Hook and Sling'". The unmentioned "multiple other" uses TufAmerica refers to are in the "Lost in the World" video and the short film based on Kanye's "Runaway". Tuff City is represented by New York attorney Kelly Talcott.

On June 16, 2013, Jay-Z announced with a tweet: "VII IV XIII Roc A Fella/Roc Nation", hinting a possible relaunch and revival of Roc-A-Fella and a possible merger with Roc Nation. However, it was later revealed that the tweet instead meant that Roc-A-Fella was only temporarily relaunched, specifically for the sole purpose of releasing his new album, Magna Carta Holy Grail.

== Legal issues ==
In June 2021, Roc-A-Fella sued its co-founder Damon Dash for attempting to auction off a non-fungible token representing the Jay-Z album Reasonable Doubt, due to Roc-A-Fella owning the rights to the album. In response, Dash claimed that he was not trying to sell the album, but his own share of the record label. On June 22, a restraining order prohibiting Dash from further selling the album was placed.

== Subsidiaries ==
=== ROC Films ===
In 2002, Roc-A-Fella released, through Lions Gate Entertainment, State Property. The movie, while not the first for Dash, would be the start of ROC Films/Roc-A-Fella Films. It starred Roc-A-Fella acts Damon Dash, Jay-Z, Beanie Sigel, DJ Clue, Memphis Bleek, and Rell. The film studio would go on to release Paid in Full the same year, and follow up in 2003 with Paper Soldiers and the hip-hop satire Death of a Dynasty. In 2005, the sequel to the studio's debut release would hit theatres, State Property 2, featuring rap stars such as Beanie Sigel and Damon Dash, who also produced and co-created the story. Cameo roles included musicians Kanye West, N.O.R.E, and Mariah Carey, and light heavyweight champion boxers Bernard Hopkins and Winky Wright. The list of films include:

- Streets Is Watching (1998)
- Backstage (2000)
- State Property (2002)
- Paid in Full (2002)
- Paper Soldiers (2002)
- Death of a Dynasty (2003)
- Fade to Black (2004)
- State Property 2 (2005)

=== Roc La Familia ===
Roc-La-Familia was founded in 2005 by then Roc-A-Fella and Def Jam President/CEO Shawn Carter. This sub-label was created to focus on signing international recording artists.

== Discography ==
=== Studio albums ===
Artist	Album	Details
Jay-Z	Reasonable Doubt	Released: June 25, 1996; Chart positions: #23 U.S.; RIAA certification: Platinum
Christión	Ghetto Cyrano	Released: November 4, 1997; Chart positions: #146 U.S.; RIAA certification: —
Jay-Z	In My Lifetime, Vol. 1	Released: November 4, 1997; Chart positions: #3 U.S.; RIAA certification: Platinum
Jay-Z	Vol. 2... Hard Knock Life	Released: September 29, 1998; Chart positions: #1 U.S.; RIAA certification: 6× Platinum
DJ Clue?	The Professional	Released: December 15, 1998; Chart positions: #26 U.S.; RIAA certification: Platinum
Memphis Bleek	Coming of Age	Released: August 3, 1999; Chart positions: #7 U.S.; RIAA certification: Gold
Jay-Z	Vol. 3... Life and Times of S. Carter	Released: December 28, 1999; Chart positions: #1 U.S.; RIAA certification: 3× Platinum
Beanie Sigel	The Truth	Released: February 29, 2000; Chart positions: #5 U.S.; RIAA certification: Gold
Amil	All Money Is Legal	Released: August 29, 2000; Chart positions: #45 U.S.; RIAA certification: —
Jay-Z	The Dynasty: Roc La Familia	Released: October 31, 2000; Chart positions: #1 U.S.; RIAA certification: 2× Platinum
Memphis Bleek	The Understanding	Released: December 5, 2000; Chart positions: #16 U.S.; RIAA certification: Gold
DJ Clue?	The Professional 2	Released: February 27, 2001; Chart positions: #3 U.S.; RIAA certification: Gold
Beanie Sigel	The Reason	Released: June 26, 2001; Chart positions: #5 U.S.; RIAA certification:
Jay-Z	The Blueprint	Released: September 11, 2001; Chart positions: #1 U.S.; RIAA certification: 3× Platinum
Jay-Z and R. Kelly	The Best of Both Worlds	Released: March 19, 2002; Chart positions: #2 U.S.; RIAA certification: Platinum
Cam'ron	Come Home with Me	Released: May 14, 2002; Chart positions: #2 U.S.; RIAA certification: Platinum
Jay-Z	The Blueprint 2: The Gift & The Curse	Released: November 12, 2002; Chart positions: #1 U.S.; RIAA certification: 3× Platinum
Freeway	Philadelphia Freeway	Released: February 25, 2003; Chart positions: #5 U.S.; RIAA certification: Gold
The Diplomats	Diplomatic Immunity	Released: March 25, 2003; Chart positions: #8 U.S.; RIAA certification: Gold
State Property	The Chain Gang Vol. 2	Released: August 12, 2003; Chart positions: #6 U.S.; RIAA certification: —
Juelz Santana	From Me to U	Released: August 19, 2003; Chart positions: #8 U.S.; RIAA certification: —
Jay-Z	The Black Album	Released: November 14, 2003; Chart positions: #1 U.S.; RIAA certification: 4× Platinum
Memphis Bleek	M.A.D.E.	Released: December 16, 2003; Chart positions: #35 U.S.; RIAA certification: —
Kanye West	The College Dropout	Released: February 10, 2004; Chart positions: #2 U.S.; RIAA certification: 6× Platinum
Young Gunz	Tough Luv	Released: February 24, 2004; Chart positions: #3 U.S.; RIAA certification: —
Jay-Z and R. Kelly	Unfinished Business	Released: October 26, 2004; Chart positions: #1 U.S.; RIAA certification: Platinum
Jay-Z and Linkin Park	Collision Course	Released: November 30, 2004; Chart positions: #1 U.S.; RIAA certification: 2× Platinum
Cam'ron	Purple Haze	Released: December 7, 2004; Chart positions: #20 U.S.; RIAA certification: Gold
Memphis Bleek	534	Released: May 17, 2005; Chart positions: #11 U.S.; RIAA certification: —
Young Gunz	Brothers from Another	Released: May 24, 2005; Chart positions: #15 U.S.; RIAA certification: —
Teairra Marí	Teairra Marí	Released: August 2, 2005; Chart positions: #5 U.S.; RIAA certification: —
Kanye West	Late Registration	Released: August 30, 2005; Chart positions: #1 U.S.; RIAA certification: 5× Platinum
Jay-Z	Kingdom Come	Released: November 21, 2006; Chart positions: #1 U.S.; RIAA certification: 2× Platinum
DJ Clue?	The Professional 3	Released: December 19, 2006; Chart positions: #73 U.S.; RIAA certification: —
Kanye West	Graduation	Released: September 11, 2007; Chart positions: #1 U.S.; RIAA certification: 8× Platinum
Jay-Z	American Gangster	Released: November 6, 2007; Chart positions: #1 U.S.; RIAA certification: Platinum
Freeway	Free at Last	Released: November 20, 2007; Chart positions: #42 U.S.; RIAA certification: —
Beanie Sigel	The Solution	Released: December 11, 2007; Chart positions: #37 U.S.; RIAA certification: —
Kanye West	808s & Heartbreak	Released: November 24, 2008; Chart positions: #1 U.S.; RIAA certification: 4× Platinum
Jadakiss	The Last Kiss	Released: April 7, 2009; Chart positions: #3 U.S.; RIAA certification: —
Kanye West	My Beautiful Dark Twisted Fantasy	Released: November 22, 2010; Chart positions: #1 U.S.; RIAA certification: 5× Platinum
Jay-Z and Kanye West	Watch the Throne	Released: August 8, 2011; Chart positions: #1 U.S.; RIAA certification: 5× Platinum
Kanye West	Yeezus	Released: June 18, 2013; Chart positions: #1 U.S.; RIAA certification: 3× Platinum
Jay-Z	Magna Carta Holy Grail	Released: July 4, 2013; Chart positions: #1 U.S.; RIAA certification: 3× Platinum

=== Soundtrack albums ===
Artist	Album	Details
Various Artists	Streets Is Watching	Released: May 12, 1998; Chart positions: #27 U.S.; RIAA certification: —
DJ Clue?	Backstage: Music Inspired by the Film	Released: August 29, 2000; Chart positions: #6 U.S.; RIAA certification: Gold
State Property	State Property	Released: January 29, 2002; Chart positions: #14 U.S.; RIAA certification: —
Various Artists	Paid in Full/Dream Team	Released: October 25, 2002; Chart positions: #53 U.S.; RIAA certification: —

=== Live albums ===
Artist	Album	Details
Jay-Z	Jay-Z: Unplugged	Released: December 18, 2001; Chart positions: #31 U.S.; RIAA certification: Gold
Kanye West	VH1 Storytellers	Released: January 5, 2010; Chart positions: —; RIAA certification: —

== See also ==
- List of Roc-A-Fella Records artists
