= Omillio Sparks =

American rapper

- Born: Kenneth Johnson; October 17, 1977 (age 48); West Philadelphia, Pennsylvania
- Genres: Hip hop
- Occupations: Rapper; actor
- Years active: 1998–present
- Labels: Roc-A-Fella; Def Jam (1998–2009)
- Formerly of: State Property

Kenneth Johnson (born October 17, 1977), better known by his stage name Omillio Sparks, is an American rapper and actor from West Philadelphia. He is best known for his uncredited guest appearance on Jay-Z's 2000 single "I Just Wanna Love U (Give It 2 Me)," which peaked at number 11 on the Billboard Hot 100. That same year, he formed the group State Property with fellow Philadelphia-based rappers including Beanie Sigel and Freeway, with whom he has released two studio albums under Jay-Z's Roc-A-Fella Records.

In his acting career, he portrayed the character Baby Boy in the group's 2002 namesake film, as well as its 2005 sequel.

== Discography ==
Sparks started his career off as a member of State Property and signed a recording contract with Roc-a-Fella Records along with Beanie Sigel and others. Sparks and the group also starred in films such as the self-titled State Property and State Property 2. He was also in the soundtrack to the film and on later group albums. Sparks appeared on many albums as a guest before releasing his debut in 2007 entitled The Inauguration, and his second solo album, which charted on the US Billboard R&B albums chart, entering in at number 80 and staying for six weeks. The Payback by Sparks, charted at 80th on the Top R&B/Hip-Hop Albums chart.

== Filmography ==
- State Property (2002)
- State Property 2 (2005)
- Soulful (2007)
- What We Do (2008)
- Streets (2011)

Murder City Angels (2016)

- 215 Miladelphia (2018)
