= Damon Dash =

American music executive (born 1971)

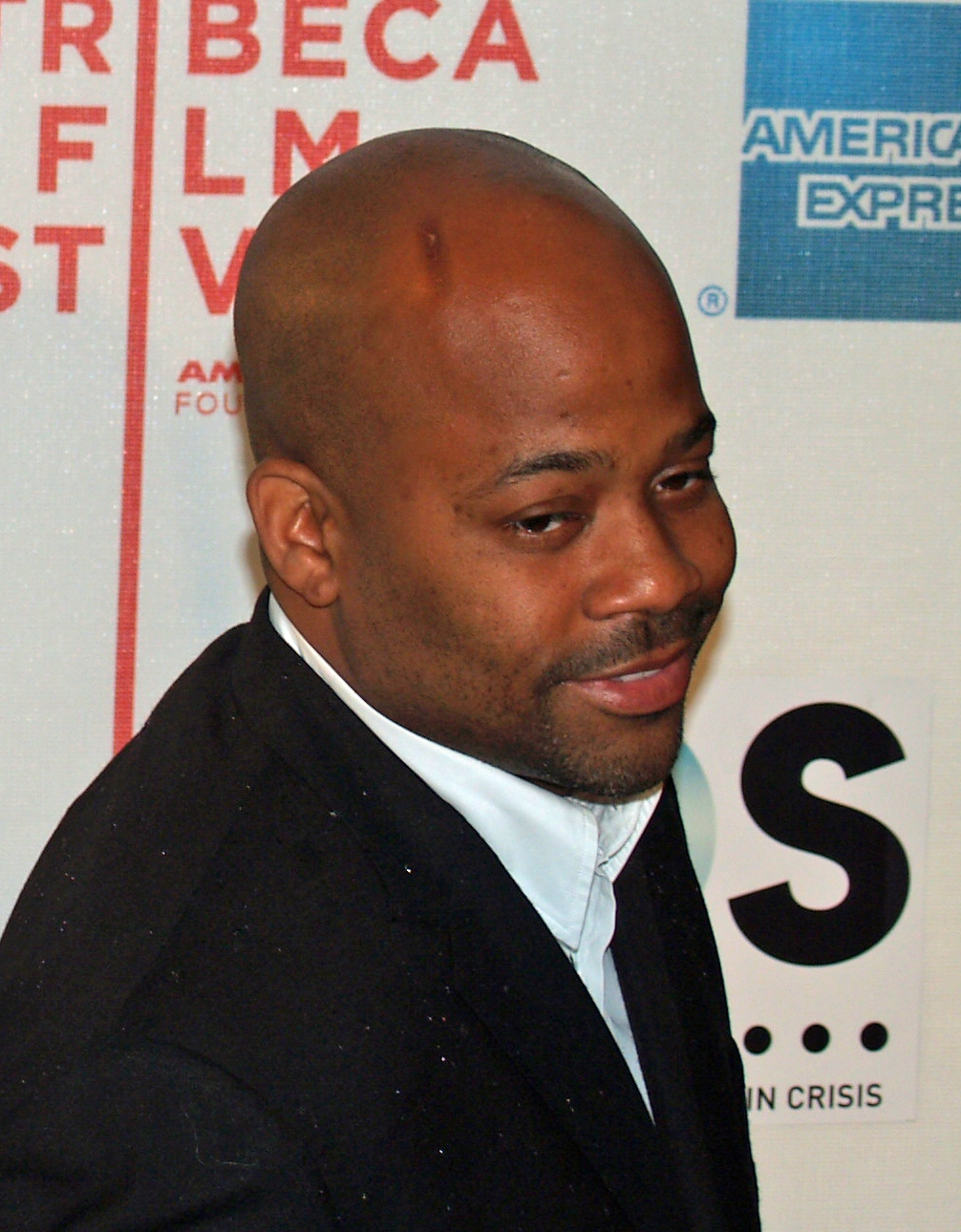
- Dash in 2007
- Born: Damon Anthony Dash; May 3, 1971 (age 55); New York City, U.S.
- Other name: Dame Dash
- Occupations: Entrepreneur; record executive; media proprietor; actor; record producer
- Years active: 1991–present
- Known for: Co–founder of Roc-A-Fella
- Spouse: Rachel Roy (m. 2005; div. 2009)
- Partners: Aaliyah (2000–2001; her death); Raquel Horn (2015–present)
- Children: 5
- Relatives: Stacey Dash (cousin); Darien Dash (cousin)

Damon Anthony Dash (born May 3, 1971) is an American entrepreneur and record executive. He co-founded Roc-A-Fella Records with Jay-Z and Kareem Burke in 1994, and co-founded the fashion retailer Rocawear with the former in 1999. He is also the founder and CEO of record labels such as Damon Dash Music Group, BluRoc Records and BlakRoc LLC.

== Early life ==
Born in New York City, Dash swept the floors of a local barbershop and sold newspapers in order to buy sneakers and shirts as a teenager. Dash "learned to hustle", in his own words, from the example of his mother, who died of an asthma attack when he was 15. The same year, Dash was diagnosed with type 1 diabetes. "Before I was diagnosed ... I went about a month or two just going to the bathroom non-stop and losing weight", Dash recalled. "Magic Johnson had just been diagnosed with AIDS, so that's what I thought I had. I was scared to even go to the doctor. I thought I was going to die."

== Career ==
Dash served as Jay-Z's manager and business partner at Roc-A-Fella Records, and in 1999, he organized a tour for Jay-Z which made $19 million. Their relationship soured as a result of two subsequent events. The first was when Roc-A-Fella Records was purchased by Def Jam Recordings (which had previously only owned half of the company) in 2004, after which Jay-Z agreed to take a job as Def Jam's president. Then, in late 2005, Jay-Z bought Dash out of his stake in Rocawear.

In April 2014, it was announced that Dash is involved with Blind Debit, a fingerprint payment application being developed by Dez White.

Dash founded DD172, a media collective which encompasses: America Nu, a magazine; VNGRD79, a web design firm; BluRoc Records, a record label division. It also includes an art gallery.

In February 2018, Dash released the album Culture Vultures (Audio Experience) alongside Kenyatta Griggs. The album saw a series of interviews with Dash about his life, put against a musical backdrop; subjects Dash discussed include his relationships with Jay Z and Aaliyah, his mother's death, and being diabetic. A book was also released, coinciding with the audio commentary.

On June 21, 2025, Dash's rock group The Black Guns released the album 365, in collaboration with rapper Freeway. Of the release, Dash stated, "I’m usually a businessman, but I wanted to be an artist and I wanted to pay homage to real rock and roll". He hosted OG Stories, an American television documentary series that premiered in 2026 on BET.

== Personal life ==
Dash met R&B singer Aaliyah in New York City in the summer of 2000 through his accountant, and dated her until her death on August 25, 2001, in a plane crash in The Bahamas. Though they were not formally engaged, in interviews given after Aaliyah's death, Dash stated that the couple had planned to marry.

In 2005, Dash married fashion designer Rachel Roy, whom he had dated prior to his relationship with Aaliyah. They met when she was working as an intern at Rocawear. Together they have two daughters, Ava Dash (born December 7, 1999) and Tallulah Dash (born May 14, 2008). Following their divorce in 2009, they had a bitter custody battle.

Dash has a son, Dame "Boogie" Dash (born November 28, 1991), with former girlfriend Linda Williams. Boogie stars in the reality television show Growing Up Hip Hop. He also has another son, Lucky, born in 2004 with Cindy Morales.

Dash and his fiancée Raquel Horn have a son, Dusko Dash, born on November 14, 2020.

Dash is a first cousin of the actress Stacey Dash.

On September 5, 2025, he announced that he had filed for Chapter 7 bankruptcy with over $25 million in debt.

== Legal issues ==
In 2012, rapper Curren$y sued Dash for $1.5 million for releasing his music without permission. Dash's attorney released a statement that Dash released the music on fair grounds.

In 2014, Dash was ordered to pay Linda Williams, the mother of his son Boogie, $50,000 for causing her to be prosecuted on harassment charges in 2009.

In April 2015, Dash's ex-wife, Rachel Roy, accused him of domestic abuse and filed for a restraining order. Roy was awarded sole custody of their daughters. The court granted Roy and her daughters with a three-year restraining order against Dash. Days later, Dash filed a $2.5 million claim against Roy in asserted damage for allegedly mishandling their joint fashion business, Royale Etenia.

In 2018, Dash settled a suit he filed against director Lee Daniels requesting $5 million to recoup a $2 million investment with interest. Lee had received financial support from Dash early in his career, and reportedly failed to repay him despite his subsequent success.

In November 2019, Dash was arrested for failing to pay more than $400,000 in child support. Dash was in New York City for an unrelated Federal Court appearance when he was arrested for two warrants. The first warrant was issued in April 2015 in the Supreme Court in New York County case of Cindy Morales; he owed $62,553 since 2012. The second warrant was issued in March 2019 in the Bronx Family Court case of Rachel Roy. He was ordered to pay her $341,991 and $25,000 for attorney fees in 2015. Dash reportedly paid more than $1 million to be released.

On September 4, 2025, Dash filed for bankruptcy; the petition showed he owed a total of $25,303,049.47 to as many as 49 creditors, with a majority of that (about $19.1 million) owed to the government in the form of taxes and other debts. He also owes nearly $648,000 in domestic support obligations to his ex-wife Rachel Roy, and his ex-girlfriend Cindy Morales.
