= Kenny Burns (radio host) =

American entrepreneur (born 1927)

Kenny Burns (born October 29, 1972) is an American media executive, radio host and entrepreneur.

== Early life ==
Burns attended Woodrow Wilson High School in Washington, D.C., before attending Morris Brown College.

== Career ==
In 2004, Burns partnered with Derek Dudley and Ryan Glover to launch men's clothing line Ryan Kenny; it landed them in Black Enterprise's February 2005 issue for the 75 Most Powerful Blacks in Corporate America. In 2005, Burns founded record label Studio 43, signing Wale as his first artist.

Burns served as Senior Vice President of Brand Development for Combs Enterprises, the entrepreneurial arm of entertainment mogul Sean Combs. Brands included Ciroc Vodka, Sean John, Bad Boy, REVOLT TV, Combs Wine and Spirits, AQUA Hydrate, DeLeón Tequila and Enyce.

In 2017, Burns expanded his business portfolio by investing in and advising Uncle Nearest Premium Whiskey, the award winning and fastest-growing American Whiskey in US history. In 2021, Burns acquired ownership in the Haitian cremas inspired LS Cream Liqueur. In 2022, Burns partnered with Spearhead Group, the first African-made spirits company, which produced Vusa Vodka and Bayab Gin.
