= Eight-ball jacket =

Style of leather jacket

David Puddy displaying his eight-ball jacket in the Seinfeld episode "The Reverse Peephole" (1998).

The eight-ball or 8-ball jacket is a style of leather jacket created by San Francisco–based designer Michael Hoban in 1990. The style is characterized by bright color-blocking and large black and white decals on the back and sleeves, made to look like the eight ball used in some cue sports. The distinctive design became trendy in 1990s fashion after being worn by athletes and hip-hop stars. The many symbolic associations of the eight ball, combined with the jacket's high retail price and celebrity associations quickly made it a status symbol for young people in the city's East Coast hip hop scene. Its popularity among youth led to robberies, some of which resulted in fatalities. Hoban's colorful designs were often counterfeited; he successfully sued a number of leather shops making knockoffs of his work. Eventually, he created a licensed diffusion line that sold lower-end versions of his jackets.

The initial trend for the jackets quickly faded, and they were soon regarded with disdain. Screenwriter Spike Feresten wrote one into the Seinfeld episode "The Reverse Peephole" (1998) in a failed attempt to make them seem uncool. The jackets have occasionally resurfaced in street fashion as a retro style, generally with some degree of irony. The jackets remain iconic in hip-hop culture, occasionally referenced in lyrics or featured in music videos.

== Design and knockoffs ==
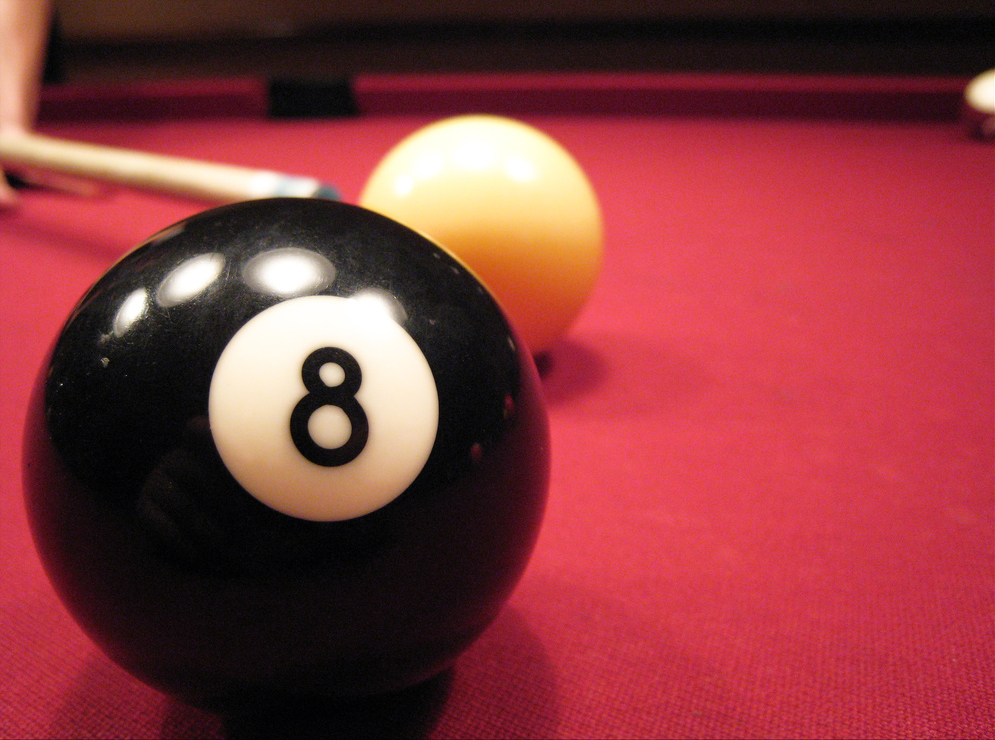
An eight ball

San Francisco-based designer Michael Hoban began creating leather fashion in the 1980s under the label North Beach Leathers. In the early 1990s, he became known for a line of high-end leather jackets with bold, colorful designs in a style sometimes referred to as "biker chic". The jackets, which originally retailed for approximately $800, were popular with celebrities and were often worn by guests on The Arsenio Hall Show, a late-night talk show. The most famous of these jackets was a style characterized by bright color-blocking and large black and white decals on the back and sleeves, made to look like the eight ball used in some cue sports. This design, first created in 1990, became popularly known as the eight-ball or 8-ball jacket.

Hoban's jackets, particularly the eight-ball jacket, were commonly counterfeited or bootlegged by other designers. Harlem-based designer Dapper Dan, known for his custom knockoffs of high-end brands targeted to consumers in the hip-hop subculture, produced luxury versions of the eight-ball jacket that retailed for $1200. Low-end counterfeit versions of the jacket sold for as little as $300, compared to the $800 price of the genuine article. Hoban fought back by sending cease and desist letters to leather shops creating knockoff jackets and suing those who refused to stop. Eight shops settled out of court with agreements to stop making the knockoffs. Hoban eventually partnered with Excelled Sheepskin & Leather Coat Corp. to create a licensed diffusion line of older designs, called "Wear Me by Michael Hoban", which used lower-quality materials and sold at a lower price point of $299 compared to the mainline jackets.

== Original trend ==
Eight-ball jackets were trendy during the early 1990s, particularly in New York City. They were popular with athletes like Darryl Strawberry and Bobby Bonilla, as well as hip-hop stars like Kid 'n Play. (Note: Some sources claim hip-hop group Salt-N-Pepa wore eight-ball jackets in the video for "Push It" (1987). The jackets from that video are color-blocked jackets without an eight-ball design. They pre-date the creation of the eight-ball jacket, and were actually designed by Dapper Dan.) Other rappers referenced the jackets in their songs. Their high retail price of $800 made them status symbols for young people in the city's East Coast hip hop scene. The eight-ball design was particularly popular in hip-hop fashion because the eight ball is symbolically associated with winning, risk, and misfortune. (Note: In eight-ball and other pool billiards games, the eight ball is the money ball. Legally pocketing it wins the game, but illegally pocketing it results in a loss.) The term "eight ball" is also slang for one-eighth of an ounce (3.5 g) of cocaine, although Hoban has stated that the drug connotation was unintentional.

The popularity of the jackets among youth led to many thefts and robberies, in New York and elsewhere. Many jackets were stolen at knife- or gunpoint; occasionally, these robberies escalated into shootings, some of which were fatal. In December 1990, it was reported that five New York youths had been shot and killed in coat-related robberies over the preceding four weeks; two were explicitly tied to eight-ball jackets. That same month, one police sergeant told Newsday that the jackets were popular targets for theft. In February 1991, the Los Angeles Times reported that over the preceding winter, 16 New York youths had been shot in robberies related to expensive eight-ball or shearling jackets; six had died. Some stores refused to stock the jackets for fear of being robbed. Two men in Windsor, Ontario, were charged in 1992 for a robbery involving an eight-ball jacket. In 2009, two suspects in a 1991 cold case robbery-murder from New York, associated to an eight-ball jacket, were arrested.

== Legacy ==
The intense popularity of the jackets quickly faded, and the design has since largely been regarded with disdain. By 1992, New York hip-hop group A Tribe Called Quest was using the jacket as a lyrical diss in the track "Show Business." The Seinfeld character David Puddy wore one in the season nine episode "The Reverse Peephole" (1998), to the horror of his girlfriend Elaine Benes. The episode's writer, Spike Feresten, later stated that he had deliberately tried to make the jacket uncool by associating it with the unfashionable character, telling The New York Times, "Obviously, it didn't work ... It's like herpes. It will always be around and some people will have it." Bronx-based comedian Daniel Baker was quoted in the Times describing the jackets as being "like colorful skin on a poisonous snake ... It's nature’s attempt at warning you that this person should be avoided." The original North Beach Leathers company closed in 2002.

Despite the negative associations, the style has occasionally resurfaced in street fashion since the 1990s, often described as a retro or "throwback" style. Ben Detrick wrote of its cyclical popularity in a 2014 New York Times article: "Like a leathery cicada, it makes its periodic return, bolstered by iconic simplicity and nefarious associations." In the 2010s, streetwear brands Stüssy and Supreme produced eight-ball jackets, although Stüssy co-founder Frank Sinatra Jr. (no relation to the singer) noted that their appreciation was ironic, stating, "You cannot take the eight ball seriously." In 2014, a New York man was charged with assault after slapping a woman who taunted him about his eight-ball jacket; the charges were dropped after a cell phone video of the incident showed she had struck him in the face with a stiletto heel shoe first.

The jackets remain iconic in hip-hop culture, referenced in lyrics and sometimes seen in music videos. Rapper Ghostface Killah of the Wu-Tang Clan referenced them in his song "Blue Armor" from the 2006 album More Fish. In 2014, rapper T.I. wore one in his music video for the single "About the Money". Rapper Missy Elliott wore a jacket inspired by the eight-ball jacket in the music video for her 2015 single "WTF (Where They From)".
