= Dapper Dan (designer) =

American fashion designer (born 1944)

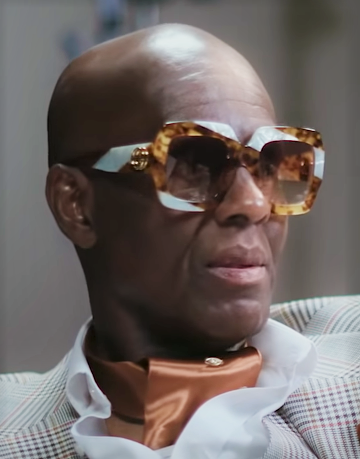
- Dan during an interview in December 2019
- Born: Daniel Day; August 8, 1944 (age 82); New York City, U.S.
- Other name: Dap
- Occupations: Businessman; fashion designer; tailor
- Years active: 1982–present
- Known for: Dapper Dan's Boutique, Dapper Dan's of Harlem
- Website: dapperdanofharlem.com

Daniel R. Day (born August 8, 1944), known as Dapper Dan, is an American fashion designer and haberdasher from Harlem, New York. His store, Dapper Dan's Boutique, operated from 1982 to 1992 and is most associated with introducing high fashion to hip hop culture; its clientele includes Mike Tyson, Walter Berry, Eric B. & Rakim, Salt-N-Pepa, LL Cool J, and Jay-Z. In 2017, he launched a fashion line with Gucci, with whom he opened a second store and atelier, Dapper Dan's of Harlem, in 2018.

Dan is included in Time's 100 Most Influential People of 2020.

== Early life ==
Dan was born in Harlem, New York, in 1944, at home with his grandmother acting as a midwife. He grew up on 129th and Lexington Avenue with three brothers and three sisters. His father, Robert, was a civil servant and his mother, Lily, a homemaker. All nine of them lived in a three-bedroom apartment. He recalls horses and buggies still on the streets in his early childhood, in the post-World War II days of Manhattan. By age 13, he was a skilled gambler; his success as a gambler helped him finance his first store.

Dapper Dan became tired of the street life after listening to a Malcolm X speech. Malcolm X said, "If you want to understand the flower, study the seed." This prompted Dan to indulge in studying at the Countee Cullen Library. He soon went back to school and entered into an academic program sponsored by the Urban League and Columbia University.

In the 1960s, Dan worked for a Harlem newspaper called Forty Acres and a Mule, as he initially wanted to become a writer. During this time he went through a life-style change and became a vegetarian. In 1968–74, he toured Africa as part of the Columbia University and the Urban League academic program.

== Career ==
=== Dapper Dan's Boutique ===
When Dan returned to New York in 1974, he decided to be a clothier, and first sold shoplifted items out of his car. Dapper Dan's Boutique, located on 125th Street between Madison and Fifth Avenues, opened in 1982, and at times was open 24 hours a day, seven days a week. Dan approached his designs through personal experience, specifically from his previous jobs. Being a professional gambler taught him that what a person wears will influence how people interact with them, so he used this unspoken language in his designs. Dan's previous disciplines are also what prepared him to simultaneously be a creative director and businessman. Additionally, he was an observer and approached his designs from a psychological point of view. When working with a new client, he would ask himself "Who are they?" and "What do they want?"

Dan originally planned to be a clothing wholesaler but soon faced prejudice as he ventured out. He struggled to buy the textiles and furs he needed, as most companies refused to do business with him because of his race or location. Instead of purchasing outfits to sell, he began teaching himself as much as he could about the industry so he could create his own designs from scratch. He would go to the public library in Midtown to study fashion and symbols, and became inspired by the power of timeless logos.

Selling his own furs was a way for Dan to get away from his old lifestyle, and he began designing furs specifically because they were a Harlem fashion staple. Irving Chaiken, Dapper Dan's friend, taught Dan different manufacturing techniques for furs, ranging from chinchilla to fox. Fred the Furrier became Dan's fur wholesale supplier, and Fred's brother was the one that persuaded Dan to expand into leather goods. He noticed designers like Louis Vuitton and Gucci were only designing bags, wallets and luggage out of leather, but he wanted to make garments out of leather. This is what essentially inspired him to make his infamous jacket for Diane Dixon.

Despite his connections, Dapper Dan struggled finding pattern makers and seamstresses that could properly execute his designs. Dan himself could not sew and did not consider himself a tailor, despite how the media depicted him, but eventually he found a team he worked well with. Dapper Dan referred to his designer-inspired designs as knock-ups, as he felt they were too extravagant to be called knock-offs. Dan states that he would never design anything that the luxury fashion houses would think of because his designs were too cutting edge. He used fabrics he designed himself after teaching himself textile printing. Notably, he invented a new process for screen printing onto leather, and would later also design jewelry and car interiors for luxury automobiles.

The opening of his store in the early 1980s coincided with the crack cocaine epidemic and the rise of hip-hop music, both of which boosted his clientele. Dan's trademark was his bold usage of logos from high-end luxury brands like Gucci, Louis Vuitton and Fendi. His first boutique was about the size of a grocery store, where clients would come in late after clubbing/partying. Dan even had security that would stand outside of a gate, while they monitored the entrance.

Dan would regularly sleep in his makeshift apartment in the back of the boutique. He would do this because the boutique was sometimes opened 24/7, and because some clients would request a 24-hour turnaround on their garments. One of Dan's clients further sparked his interest in logos, when she came in with a new Louis Vuitton clutch. He had never seen one in person before and this is what changed the game for him. Dapper Dan's original boutique is now a chain school called Harlem Children's Zone Academy.

Though his clothing was often referred to as streetwear, Day's early clients in the 1980s were inspired significantly by the fashion flamboyance of Rat Pack icons like Frank Sinatra and Sammy Davis Jr. His main clientele were "hustlers and street people"—including drug kingpin Alpo Martinez—some of whom even requested bullet-proof parkas and hats.

Day ventured into hip hop fashion in 1985, when he first styled LL Cool J, and Day has since been associated with hip-hop royalty. Eric B. & Rakim who wore Dapper Dan's designs on the cover of their iconic albums Paid in Full (1987) and Follow The Leader (1988). He also created looks for The Fat Boys, Salt-N-Pepa, KRS-One, Bobby Brown, Jam Master Jay and Big Daddy Kane, as well as sports stars such as boxers Mike Tyson and Floyd Mayweather, and athlete Diane Dixon.

Day's illegal use of logos in his custom-made designs led to counterfeiting raids and litigation, and ultimately the demise of his first store. In 1988, Tyson got into a brawl with Mitch Green outside his store, which put Dapper Dan's in the media spotlight for the first time. After Tyson was photographed wearing a "knock off" Fendi jacket from Dapper Dan—which was referred to as "an all-night clothing store that caters to performers" in The New York Times—interest in the store eventually brought his usage of European luxury fashion logos to the attention of the European luxury companies. In 1992, after legal action by Fendi and then-U.S. Attorney Sonia Sotomayor, Dapper Dan's was shut down for good. He was shunned by the mainstream fashion world for decades, though he continued to work "underground" as a designer. He began outfitting undefeated boxer Floyd Mayweather in 1999.

=== Resurgence ===
In September 2006 to February 2007 the Museum of the City of New York Fashion, showcased Dapper Dan's samples in an exhibition called Black Styles Now.

Dan's career has been revitalized in the 2010s, and he has found mainstream success since 2017. In mid-2017, in a homage to Dapper Dan, Gucci's creative director Alessandro Michele designed a jacket based on a well-known Dapper Dan design for Diane Dixon in 1989. The original was a fur-lined jacket with balloon sleeves covered in the Louis Vuitton logo, which Michele replaced with the double-G Gucci logo. Social media reacted when Dixon shared a photo of the Gucci jacket next to her in the original one, with Dixon requesting that Dapper Dan get credit for his original; many believed that Gucci had stolen the Dapper Dan design, especially due to Gucci not stating it to be a homage until after they drew criticism. This led to Diane Dixon proposing a Gucci and Dapper Dan collaboration. Michelle and Dapper Dan used a subcultural style when seeking out inspiration for their collection, to ensure a unique aesthetic.

In 2017, with the support of Michele and Gucci CEO Marco Bizzarri, Dan and the Italian brand partnered for a line of men's wear.

In 2018, Dan opened a new atelier on Lenox Avenue in partnership with Gucci, Dapper Dan of Harlem, the first luxury house fashion store in Harlem.

In May 2019, Gucci released a limited edition of Dapper Dan's Harlem.

Gucci Garden Gallery in Florence, references Dapper Dan and the infamous jacket.

Dapper Dan is now a board member for reviewing applications for the Gucci Changemakers North America Scholarship program.

In December 2023, Dapper Dan collaborated with American retailer Gap Inc. on a collection.

In February 2025, Dapper Dan became a member of the costume institute benefit host committee at The Met.

== In popular culture ==
Dapper Dan has worked with musicians like Bobby Brown, Eric B. & Rakim, LL Cool J, Big Daddy Kane and Salt-N-Pepa, essentially bridging the gap between hip-hop culture and luxury fashion.

In 2001, Dapper Dan was referenced in a Jay-Z lyric in his song "U Don't Know" from his album The Blueprint. In 2002, he was referenced multiple times in the Alpo Martinez crime film Paid in Full. Additionally in 2019, he was referenced in the poem Dapper Dan Meets Petey Shooting Cee-lo by Willie Perdomo.

Tyler, the Creator references Dapper Dan in his song "Odd Toddlers" from his debut studio album Bastard.

In September 2016, prior to the premiere of the Netflix original series Luke Cage, Dapper Dan was featured in part of the "Street Level Hero" digital social video series to discuss Luke Cage, which is set in Harlem. He appeared in two episodes of the series, one in the first season and one in the second, playing himself.

In November 2017, he appeared in a segment on Conan for Conan O'Brien's stay at the Apollo Theater in which he styled the talk show host.

Dapper Dan: Made in Harlem: A Memoir was published by Random House in 2019. Sony Pictures bought the rights to a film adaptation, with comedian Jerrod Carmichael attached as screenwriter and producer. Day will serve as executive producer of the film.

Spanish singer Rosalía referenced Mr. Dan in the track "Combi Versace" from her third studio album, Motomami.

In 2019, Dapper Dan was a guest judge on Project Runway for the street wear challenge; Season 17 Episode 5.

Nicki Minaj references Dan in her verse on the Lil Uzi Vert track "Endless Fashion".

Indian-Punjabi singer and rapper Navaan Sandhu released a song named “Dapper Dan” as a part of his album “House Navior” in 2025.

== Personal life ==
Dan has had eight children with seven women: William Long, Daniel Day Jr., Danique Day, Aisha Day, Danielle Day, Malik Day, Tiffany White and Jelani Day, who is the brand manager for his father.

== See also ==
- Hip hop fashion
