= Sur Fresh =

- Fresh in 2010

Background information
- Genres: Hip hop
- Occupation(s): rapper, songwriter, model

Kenneth Barclift better known by his stage name Fresh or Sur Fresh A lot is an American rapper, songwriter, model and actor. He is best known for being part of the Retro Kids, who became famous for their retro 80's look and style.

== Career ==
=== Retro Kids ===
While with the Retro Kids, Barclift appeared in commercials for MTV and posed for Complex Magazine. In an article for the New York Times, Barclift expressed an interest in collaborating with film director Spike Lee to do an 80's movie. One of the co-founders of both Mecca and Enyce clothing lines, Tony Shellman, said of the Retro Kids "They're so energetic and creative". Shellman also had the group pose for his clothing line Parish which has a retro hip-hop style. Pop Robinson, creative director of Pro-Keds, gave the Retro Kids high praise by saying "They validate a brand like Pro-Keds because we're from the old school."

=== Solo artist ===
After leaving the Retro Kids, Barclift became a solo artist.
