= Posse cut =

Type of rap song

A posse cut is a popular form of song in hip hop music that involves successive verses by four or more rappers.

Tracks described as posse cuts by Rolling Stone include A Tribe Called Quest's "Scenario", "Tha Shit" by The D.O.C., "Doin' Our Own Dang" by Jungle Brothers, "Monster" and "So Appalled" by Kanye West, and "Set It Off" by Snoop Dogg. Tracks described by AllMusic as posse cuts include "Wu-Gambinos" by Raekwon, "1, 2, 3" by Naughty by Nature, and "Head Banger" by EPMD.

== History ==
Many classic early hip hop tracks, such as Afrika Bambaataa & the Soul Sonic Force's "Zulu Nation Throwdown", took the form of a posse cut. The posse cut became established in the eighties as a way for rappers to give exposure to their friends, or their posse. However, towards the end of the eighties and the start of the nineties, the posse cut began to be used as an "All-Stars" device to bring together rappers who had respect for each other's skills on the microphone, or a way to unite various well-known and respected artists to deliver an important message.

== Notable examples ==
=== 1980s–90s ===
Notable Examples of Posse Cuts (1980s–90s)
Track	Artists	Notes
"The Symphony"	Marley Marl, Masta Ace, Craig G, Kool G Rap, Big Daddy Kane	Allmusic describes it as "one of the best posse cuts in hip-hop history", and "classic".
"Scenario"	A Tribe Called Quest, Leaders of the New School	Rolling Stone describes "Scenario" as "the ultimate posse cut", and in Allmusic's review of "Scenario" they say, "not only did Tribe make history on The Low End Theory by putting together one of the best hip-hop albums of all time, they also opened up a hole in the sky for the emergence of the ever-unique and talented genius of Busta Rhymes".
"The Anthem"	Sway & King Tech, RZA, Eminem, Tech N9ne, Xzibit, Pharoahe Monch, and others	A 1999 posse cut featuring various artists. Described as a "classic posse cut".

=== 2000s–20s ===
Notable Examples of Posse Cuts (2000s–20s)
Track	Artists	Notes
"Candy (Drippin' Like Water)"	Snoop Dogg, E-40, MC Eiht, Goldie Loc, Tha Dogg Pound, Ladybug Mecca	From the album "Tha Blue Carpet Treatment". Produced by Rick Rock.
"Its Okay (One Blood MegaMix)"	The Game, Jim Jones, Snoop Dogg, Nas, T.I., Fat Joe, Lil Wayne, N.O.R.E., Jadakiss, Styles P, Fabolous, Juelz Santana, Rick Ross, Twista, Tha Dogg Pound (Kurupt & Daz Dillinger), WC, E-40, Bun B, Chamillionaire, Slim Thug, Young Dro, Clipse (Pusha T & No Malice), Ja Rule	The song begins with "Dre, I See More Dead People." It is 11 minutes and 50 seconds long.
"The Last Huzzah!"	Mr. Muthafuckin' eXquire, Despot, Heems, Kool A.D., Danny Brown, El-P	A remix of Exquire's "Huzzah". Named one of the best songs of 2011 by Rolling Stone.
"Mercy"	Kanye West, Big Sean, Pusha T, 2 Chainz	From the album Cruel Summer. Hailed as the best song of 2012 by various publications, including SPIN Magazine.
"Oldie"	Taco, Tyler, The Creator, Hodgy, Left Brain, Mike G, Domo Genesis, Frank Ocean, Jasper Dolphin, Earl Sweatshirt	This is last song from the group Odd Future's final album The OF Tape Vol.2.
"1 Train"	ASAP Rocky, Kendrick Lamar, Joey Badass, Yelawolf, Danny Brown, Action Bronson, Big K.R.I.T.	From the album Long. Live. ASAP.
"Piñata"	Freddie Gibbs, Madlib, Domo Genesis, G-Wiz, Casey Veggies, Sulaiman, Meechy Darko, Mac Miller	Last song from the Freddie Gibbs and Madlib album Piñata.
"Rolling 110 Deep"	DJ Kay Slay, Sheek Louch, Styles P, Dave East, Crooked I, Black Thought, Conway the Machine, Raekwon, Ghostface Killah, Inspectah Deck, Papoose, Loaded Lux, AZ, Bun B, Fred the Godson, Jim Jones, Ransom, Rah Digga, M.O.P., Trae tha Truth, Joell Ortiz, Lord Tariq and Peter Gunz, Cory Gunz, Shaq Diesel, Roy Jones Jr., Kool DJ Red Alert, Redman, Young Buck, MC Serch, Big Daddy Kane, MC Shan, KRS-One, Jon Connor, Twista, Drag-On, Chris Rivers, Nino Man, Locksmith, 3D Na'Tee, Trick-Trick, Tragedy Khadafi, E-A-Ski, Cassidy, Freddie Foxxx, Gillie da Kid, Ice-T, Treach, Kool G Rap, Lil Cease, RJ Payne, J.R. Writer, Shoota93, Ms. Hustle, Vado, Mysonne, Mistah F.A.B., Saigon, Melle Mel, Grandmaster Caz, Havoc, Tracey Lee, Outlawz, Herb Gruff, Stan Spit, Sickflo, Onyx, Ras Kass, Termanology, DJ Doowop, Junior Reid, Oun P, Merkules, Wais P, Maino, Uncle Murda, PT Capone, Mike Cee, Royal Flush, Super Lover Cee, Page Kennedy, Rockness Monsta, Gunplay, Brand Nubian, Sonja Blade, Coke La Rock, Nice & Smooth, Consequence, Millyz, OT The Real, Metta Sandiford-Artest, Kaflow Kaboom, Tone Trump, Hocus 45th, Omar Epps, Bodega Bamz, Bynoe, Prince The King, Aobie, Sporty Thievz, Tony Moxberg, Styleon, Chuck D, Sauce Money	From his 2021 mixtape Accolades. Produced by Trackateering Music.
"Rolling 200 Deep"	DJ Kay Slay, Sheek Louch, Snoop Dogg, Raekwon, Papoose, Bun B, Millyz, Dave East, Run-DMC, Jim Jones, AZ, Sha-Rock, Ice-T, Freeway, Maino, Gorilla Nems, Royal Flush, Grandmaster Caz, Cassidy, King Flo, DJ Spinderella, Cory Gunz, KXNG Crooked, Joell Ortiz, M.O.P., Coke La Rock, Sauce Money, RJ Payne, Uncle Murda, Whispers, Keen Streetz, Piif Jones, Nero Ron, Large Professor, OT the Real, Paul Wall, Nino Man, Mic Geronimo, Ransom, Ms. Hustle, Melle Mel, Shoota93, Ras Kass, DJ Doowop, Haddy Racks, Kid Capri, Bynoe, Kool Keith, GTB King Card, B-Real, Herb Gruff, Stan Spit, Knick Gunz, Tony Touch, Vado, Grand Puba, Axel Leon, Smooth da Hustler, Trigga tha Gambler, Slim Dyme, Big Daddy Kane, Shyheim, Oun P, Page Kennedy, PRAYAH, Tony Yayo, Double X Posse, Big Noyd, Head Ice, E-A-Ski, Sadat X, Artifacts, Brillo, Daddy-O, Chi-Ali, Tragedy Khadafi, Twista, Goodie Mob, Outlawz, Hocus 45th, Billboard Baby, The Hoodies, China Mac, E. Ness, DJ Paul, Jakk Frost, Kaflow Kaboom, Majesty, Neek The Exotic, PT Capone, O.C., Termanology, Tony Moxberg, Wais P, Talk It Trigga, ZipWithTheDrip, Treach, Rah Digga, Mysonne, Jon Connor, Jae Millz, Rockness Monsta, Smif-n-Wessun, Skyzoo, Mikey D, Tone Trump, Locksmith, Big T, Saigon, Sha Queen, Peter Gunz, King Bless, Corporal AK, The Legion, DV Alias Kryst, Nutso, Waterbed Kev, Torae, Mickey Factz, Young Buck, 88 LO, Smooth B, King Malachi, Master Rob, Vita, Merkules, Nytro, Iron Sheikh, Bishop Lamont, Capitalist, Jade Diamonds, Sparky D, Onyx, Paula Perry, Tahmell, Da Inphamus Amadeuz, Cortez Bodega, Superstar Floss, Innocent?, MC TNT, Tracey Lee, Aobie, Kurtis Blow, Lady Katz, MC Globe, Tony Sunshine, Imam Thug, Mistah F.A.B., Layzie Bone, Lazarus, Neek Da Skittz, J.R. Writer, Terror van Poo, ItsBizkit, Dyce Payso, Klass Murda, MC Rayvon, Johnny Wa, Chip-Fu, Iman Shumpert, J SOS, Manolo Bandz, Kitty Gata, Ghostface Killah, Sporty Thievz, Trae tha Truth, Don Q, T.I., KRS-One, E-40, MC Serch	A year and a half after his death, DJ Kay Slay is being honored with the release of the ultimate posse cut in the form of "Rolling 200 Deep." Produced by Trackateering Music.
"Sticky"	GloRilla, Lil Wayne, Sexyy Red, Tyler, the Creator	On Tyler’s album Chromakopia

== See also ==
- Cypher, a form of freestyle rap with multiple rappers
