= The Reverse Peephole =

- Seinfeld episode
- Episode no.: Season 9 Episode 12
- Directed by: Andy Ackerman
- Written by: Spike Feresten
- Production code: 912
- Original air date: January 15, 1998

Guest appearances
- Wayne Knight as Newman; Patrick Warburton as David Puddy; Jon Polito as Silvio; Pat Finn as Joe Mayo; Jennette Robbins as Keri; Fitz Houston as Cop; Joe Basile as Delivery Guy; Lauren Bowles as Waitress; Ruth Cohen as Ruthie Cohen (uncredited)

Episode chronology
← Previous "The Dealership"	Next → "The Cartoon"
- Seinfeld season 9

"The Reverse Peephole" is the 168th episode of the NBC sitcom Seinfeld. This was the 12th episode of the ninth and final season.. The episode aired on NBC on January 15, 1998. It was written by Spike Feresten and directed by Andy Ackerman. In this episode, Jerry gets rid of his wallet and ultimately replaces it with a European carry-all, Kramer and Newman face possible eviction after they reverse the peepholes on their doors and Newman begins an affair with the super's wife, and Elaine has to recover a friend's fur coat which she mistakenly threw out a window.

== Plot ==
Elaine, Jerry and George decide to buy a massage chair as a housewarming gift for their friend Joe Mayo. To save money, George buys a chair from Delaware, but it does not arrive in time so they go to Joe Mayo's party without it. Elaine is embarrassed by David Puddy having a fur coat, so when she is placed in charge of the coats, Elaine secretly throws Puddy's fur coat out the window. She later finds out she dispatched Joe's near-identical coat instead, and Joe demands Elaine buy him a new coat.

Kramer and Newman reverse the peepholes on their apartment doors to spot any ambushes inside their rooms. When the super, Silvio, learns they did this without his authorization, he assumes Newman instigated it. He only refrains from evicting Newman because Kramer speaks on his behalf. Kramer notices Newman is having an affair with Silvio's wife, and realizes he and Newman will both be evicted if Silvio finds out.

At Kramer's suggestion, Jerry throws out his wallet and just folds his bills together, saving pocket space. He mocks George for having a wallet that is so stuffed with coupons that it gives him back pain. The massage chair is delivered to George by mistake. When he discovers how good it is for his back pain, he delays giving it to Joe. When Jerry complains about having to carry around his girlfriend's things, Elaine gives him a European carry-all, which resembles a purse.

Kramer mentions to Elaine that Newman recovered Joe's fur coat from a tree. She tries to convince Newman to give her Joe's coat, but he has already given it to Silvio's wife. When he learns of the fur coat, Silvio threatens to evict Kramer and Newman over the affair. To save himself, Kramer claims the fur coat is Jerry's, and gets Jerry to wear it in front of Silvio. Silvio believes him until Elaine walks up and asks why Jerry is wearing Joe's coat. Silvio then plots revenge on Joe. A thief snatches Jerry's carry-all. Jerry calls to a policeman, but the policeman does not know what a European carry-all is, so Jerry has to describe it as his "purse".

Elaine, Jerry, and Kramer back out of participating in their chair gift (Elaine because Joe demanded she buy him a new coat, Jerry because Joe criticized his taste in music, and Kramer because he has no recollection of agreeing to the gift). George plans to return the chair. When he puts a tear-away phone number for a free guitar lesson in his already overstuffed wallet, much of the contents burst out and blow away, including the receipt.

Silvio ambushes Joe from inside his room with a sock full of pennies. Seeing how ostentatious Jerry looks in the fur coat, Puddy sells his fur coat and buys a garish leather eight-ball jacket.

== Production ==
The wallet story stemmed from an argument in the Seinfeld writers' room. Spike Feresten, the episode's writer, remarked that wallets had become pointless, and Seinfeld co-creator/writer/star Jerry Seinfeld began arguing the point with him. Feresten won over Seinfeld by dumping out the contents of Seinfeld's wallet and showing him how much of its contents he had no real use for. George developing back pain from his wallet proved to be true to life; sitting with the massive wallet in his back pocket during the episode's rehearsals and filming caused George actor Jason Alexander to hurt his back. The wallet bursting open at the episode's climax was accomplished by a stunt man firing an air gun precisely at the wallet.

The reference to Stein Eriksen was added to the script by Jerry Seinfeld.

Feresten wrote David Puddy's eight-ball jacket into the show, later stating that he had deliberately tried to make the jacket uncool by associating it with the unfashionable character, telling The New York Times, "Obviously, it didn't work."

== Analysis ==
Paul Arras, in his book Seinfeld: A Cultural History, praised "The Reverse Peephole" for its commentary on gender norms, writing that it "flips gender markers around by giving men fashion items that are normally viewed as feminine." Religious historian Ted Merwin cited the episode to highlight the thematic importance of clothing in American Jewish comedy, alongside previous episodes "The Jacket" and "The Puffy Shirt".
