= Sp5der =

Streetwear and fashion brand

- Product type: Clothing, accessories
- Current owner: King Spider LLC
- Produced by: King Spider LLC
- Country: United States
- Introduced: 2019
- Related brands: hip-hop fashion
- Website: kingspider.co

Sp5der is an American streetwear and fashion brand founded by American rapper, Jeffery Lamar Williams, also known as Young Thug. It operates in Los Angeles, California, with roots in Atlanta, Georgia. Established in 2019, Sp5der became a proper fashion brand in 2024. On September 8, Sp5der presented its Fall/Winter 2024 collection during the New York Fashion Week.

The brand has been worn by many artists and influencers in the hip-hop industry.

== History ==
On July 4, 2019, the first public release of hoodies and T-shirts featuring the “SP5DER” screen print and stylized dots above the number “5” took place. The brand was created as a way to express personal style for streetwear. The inspiration comes from Atlanta, the brand's aesthetic combined high-end fashion elements with bold street culture.

By 2023, Sp5der became global by expanding their market outside the United States into Asia and Europe.

In 2024, Sp5der presented its Fall/Winter 2024 collection during the New York Fashion Week. The brand showcased over 35 co-ed looks, the inclusion in the fashion event showcased the brand's transition into high fashion while maintaining its roots in streetwear.

== Products ==
Sp5der first became known for graphic hoodies and sweats, and later expanded into a broader streetwear and ready-to-wear offering. The brand's early identity was centered on hoodies that typically sold-out, while later collections added T-shirts, sweatpants, shorts, denim, outerwear, and accessories.

By its New York Fashion Week period, the label was presenting more developed ready-to-wear pieces alongside its established casual staples, including leather jackets, elevated denim, tracksuits, and other cut-and-sew garments.
