= Rich Porter =

American drug dealer from Harlem, New York, US

- Porter in 1989
- Born: Richard Thomas Porter; July 26, 1964; New York City, U.S.
- Died: January 3, 1990 (aged 25); New York City, U.S.
- Cause of death: Murder (gunshot wounds)
- Other names: Money Rich; Rich; Richie Rich
- Occupation: Drug kingpin
- Children: Donnell Whiten, Reshonia Porter, and Rhea Porter
- Status: Deceased
- Convictions: a) 1984 drug possession b) 1984 weapons possession
- Penalty: 1-year prison sentence

Richard Thomas Porter (July 26, 1964 – January 3, 1990) was an American drug kingpin and gangster who rose to prominence in the Harlem neighborhood of New York City during the crack era in the mid-1980s. The 2002 film Paid in Full was based on Rich and his partners Azie Faison and Alpo Martinez.

== Life ==
Born in the Harlem section of New York City, Porter was the oldest of three children born to Velma Porter. He had a younger sister, Patricia (born in 1966), and a brother, William Donnell (1977–c.1990). Porter began selling drugs at the age of 12, rising through the ranks of the drug trade in Harlem. He became known for his flamboyant and high-profile lifestyle. He was rumored to have never worn the same outfit twice and to have owned over a dozen luxury vehicles that he kept in a garage in Manhattan during the height of his career as a drug dealer.

== Death ==
Rich Porter was murdered on January 3, 1990, and his body was found in the vicinity of Orchard Beach, the Bronx, the following day. Porter had been shot several times in the head and chest, and at the time of his death police found $2,239 (equivalent to $5,500 in 2025) in his pocket. Porter's friend and former drug-dealing partner Alpo Martinez was charged with the murder and was later convicted.

On December 5, 1989, Porter's 12-year-old brother, William Porter, was kidnapped in Harlem on his way to school. The kidnappers cut William’s finger off in order to extort $500,000, later lowered to $350,000, in ransom money from Rich (equivalent to $1,300,000 and $900,000 in 2025). William was eventually killed, and his body was found on January 28, 1990, a mile away from where Rich's body was found, less than one month after Rich's murder. Rich's maternal uncle, Johnny "Apple" Porter, was found to be responsible for William's kidnapping and murder.

== In popular culture ==
The 2002 film Paid in Full was based on the life and death of Rich and his involvement in drug dealing along with Azie Faison and Alpo Martinez. His character was portrayed by fellow Harlem native Mekhi Phifer. Richard Porter and the kidnapping and murder of his 12-year-old brother are also the subject of an episode of The FBI Files (Season 3, Episode 18), "The C-11 Squad".
