= Wood Harris =

American actor (born 1969)

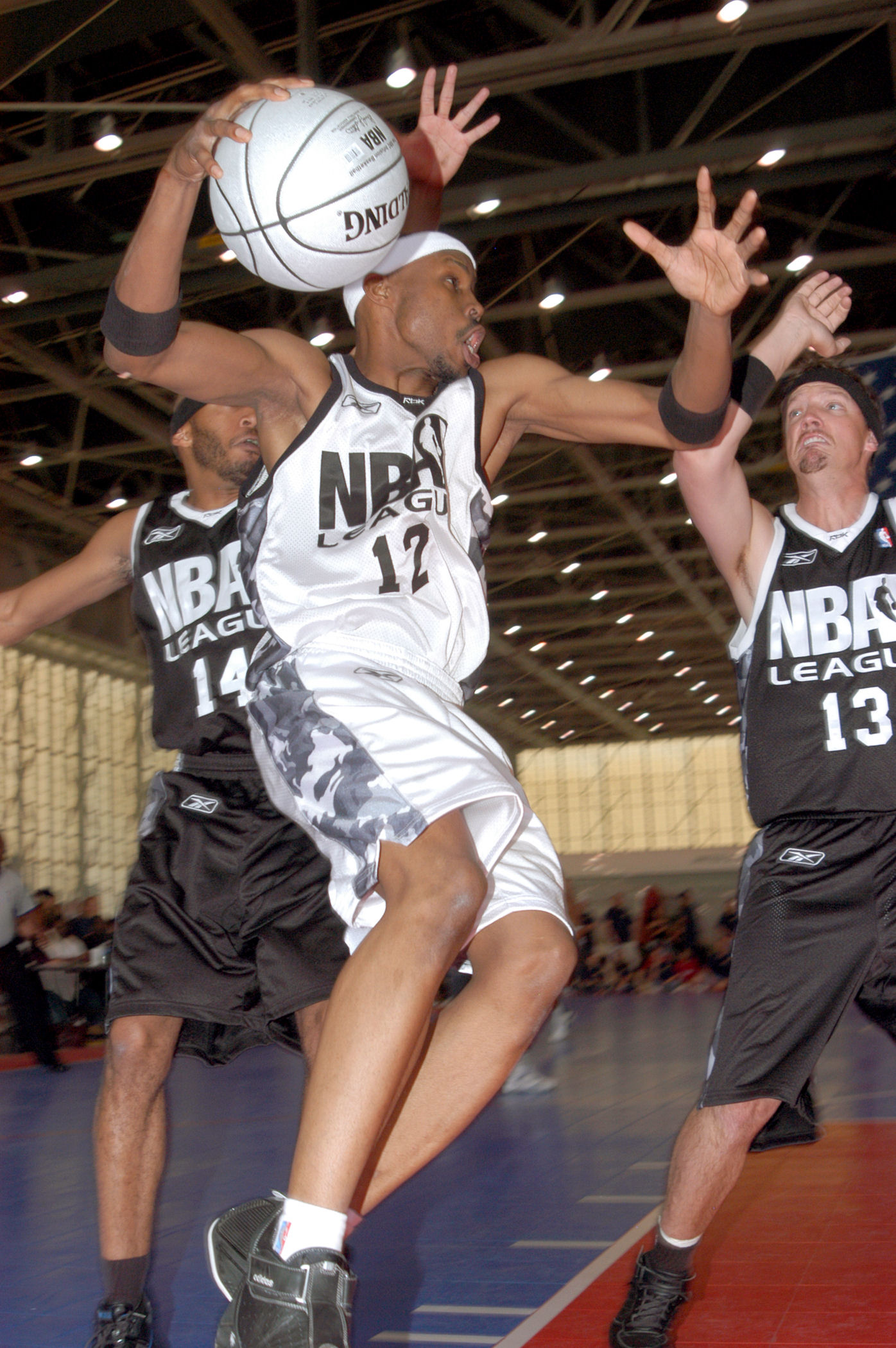
- Harris (center) in 2011
- Born: Sherwin David Harris; October 17, 1969 (age 56); Chicago, Illinois, U.S.
- Education: Northern Illinois University (BA); New York University (MFA)
- Occupation: Actor
- Years active: 1993–present
- Spouse: Rebekah Harris (m. 2001)
- Children: 2
- Relatives: Steve Harris (brother)

Sherwin David "Wood" Harris (born October 17, 1969) is an American actor. He first garnered attention for his role as Motaw in the Jeff Pollack film Above the Rim (1994), before portraying high school football player Julius Campbell in the Walt Disney Pictures film Remember the Titans (2000) and Jimi Hendrix in the Showtime television film Hendrix (2000). He attained further recognition for his portrayal of drug kingpin Avon Barksdale on the HBO crime drama The Wire (2002–2008). Harris also played the role of cocaine dealer Ace, based on the life of Azie Faison, in the crime film Paid in Full (2002).

His other notable film work includes the dark comedy Next Day Air (2009), the science fiction films Dredd (2012) and Blade Runner 2049 (2017), the Marvel Studios superhero film Ant-Man (2015), and the sports drama Creed (2015), along with its sequels Creed II (2018) and Creed III (2023). In 2025, he portrayed Laredo in the film One Battle After Another.

On television, Harris starred as Barry Fouray on the VH1 series The Breaks (2016–2017), Brooke Payne on the BET miniseries The New Edition Story (2017), Damon Cross on the Fox series Empire during its fifth and sixth seasons, and the drug lord "Pat" in the Starz series BMF (2021–2025).

== Early life and education ==
Harris, who is of African American heritage, was born in Chicago, Illinois, the son of seamstress Mattie and bus driver John Henry Harris. He is the younger brother of actor Steve Harris. He was given the nickname "Wood" by friends in his neighborhood because "Sherwin" was too difficult for some to pronounce. Harris discovered a passion for the arts as early as age twelve when he focused on drawing and painting. He played basketball for St. Joseph's School, the subject of the award-winning documentary, Hoop Dreams.

He holds a Bachelor of Arts in Theater Arts from Northern Illinois University (NIU), where he also played on the school's basketball team. Harris earned a Master of Fine Arts from New York University. At one point, Harris was dismissed from NYU for tardiness; however, his classmates successfully petitioned to have him reinstated.

== Career ==
While enrolled in NIU, Harris starred in his first major film role in the basketball drama Above the Rim, opposite Duane Martin and co-starring Tupac Shakur, and appeared in many theatrical stage productions of various off-Broadway plays. Harris subsequently guest-starred in a variety of television and film venues before portraying legendary rock guitarist Jimi Hendrix in Showtime's 2000 film, Hendrix.

Later that year, Harris received his first NAACP Image Award nomination for "Outstanding Supporting Actor in a Motion Picture" along with the Blockbuster Movie Award nomination for "Favorite Supporting Actor in a Motion Picture" for his role as Julius "Big Ju" Campbell in Remember the Titans. In 2002, he starred in the Dame Dash produced cult-classic film Paid in Full, based on the true story of three Harlem drug dealers with Harris playing the real-life kingpin Azie Faison.

He starred as Avon Barksdale, loosely based on the real-life Nathan Barksdale, in the HBO's original series The Wire. He also produced his own debut album, Beautiful Wonderful, which was intended for release in 2005.

In June 2008, director Martin Guigui revealed that Harris was cast as Nate "Sweetwater" Clifton in Sweetwater, a movie about the first black player in the NBA; however, the movie was not released until 2023 with another actor in the starring role.

In 2009, Harris starred in the film Just Another Day, as a successful fictional rapper named A-maze. The film centers on a clash between a young up-and-coming rapper and an older one at the top of his game, the former played by Jamie Hector (whose character Marlo Stanfield had a similar role with respect to Harris' character in The Wire). In 2012, Harris narrated the ESPN 30 for 30 film Benji. In the same year he also played Harold "Mitch" Mitchell in the Broadway revival of A Streetcar Named Desire by Tennessee Williams; alongside Blair Underwood, Nicole Ari Parker, and Daphne Rubin-Vega. In 2015, he reunited with The Wire cast member Michael B. Jordan for his role as Tony "Little Duke" Evers in Creed, reprising the role in its sequels.

== Filmography ==
=== Film ===
Year	Title	Role	Notes
1994	Above the Rim	Motaw	
1997	As Good as It Gets	Cafe 24 Busboy	
1998	Celebrity	Al Swayze	
1998	The Siege	Officer Henderson	
2000	Committed	Chicky	
2000	The Gold Cup	Clayton	
2000	Are You Cinderella?	-	Short
2000	Remember the Titans	Julius Campbell	
2000	Train Ride	Will	
2002	Paid in Full	Ace	
2004	Joy Road	Tony Smalls	
2005	Dirty	Brax	
2006	Southland Tales	Dion Element	
2006	The Heart Specialist	Dr. Sidney Zachary	
2007	4 Life	Dayvon	Video
2008	Jazz in the Diamond District	Gabriel Marx	
2009	Not Easily Broken	Darnell Gooden	
2009	Dough Boys	Julian France	
2009	Next Day Air	Guch	
2009	Just Another Day	A-Maze	
2012	The Babymakers	Darrell	
2012	Dredd	Kay	
2015	Ant-Man	Gale	
2015	Creed	Tony "Little Duke" Evers	
2017	Once Upon a Time in Venice	Prince	
2017	9/11	Michael	
2017	Blade Runner 2049	Nandez	
2018	Creed II	Tony "Little Duke" Evers	
2018	Gangland: The Musical	Reeby	
2020	Always and Forever	Danny	
2021	Ransun Games	Henchman #1	
2021	Space Jam: A New Legacy	Coach C	
2023	Creed III	Tony "Little Duke" Evers	
2023	Shooting Stars	Dru Joyce II	
2025	One Battle After Another	Laredo	
TBA	Weekend Warriors	TBA	Post-production

=== Television ===
Year	Title	Role	Notes
1996	NYPD Blue	Hector	Episode: "Moby Greg"
1997	Oz	Officer Gordon Wood	Episode: "Plan B"
1997	Cosby	Tony	Episode: "The Rules"
1998	New York Undercover	Shadow	Episode: "Going Native"
1999	Spenser: Small Vices	Ellis Alves	TV movie
2000	Hendrix	Jimi Hendrix	TV movie
2000	Rhapsody	Billy Dixon	TV movie
2002	Def Poetry Jam	Himself	Episode: "Episode #2.7"
2002–2008	The Wire	Avon Barksdale	Main cast (season 1–3), guest (season 5)
2003	The Twilight Zone	Marvin Gardens/Dwayne Grant	Episode: "Another Life"
2007	Numb3rs	Murphy 'Pony' Fuñez	Episode: "The Art of Reckoning"
2008	Black Poker Stars Invitational	Himself	Main guest
2008	House	Bowman	Episode: "Last Resort"
2009	Played by Fame	-	Episode: "The Jealous Boyfriend"
2010	Southland	Trinney Day	Recurring cast (season 2)
2010	Hawaii Five-0	Russell Ellison	Episode: "Nalowale"
2012	30 for 30	Himself	Episode: "Benji"
2013	The Watsons Go to Birmingham	Daniel Watson	TV movie
2014	Justified	Jay	Recurring cast (season 5)
2016	The Breaks	Barry Fouray	TV movie
2017	The New Edition Story	Brooke Payne	Main cast
2017	The Breaks	Barry Fouray	Main cast
2017–2021	Bronzeville	Everett Copeland	Recurring cast (season 1), guest (season 2)
2018–2020	Empire	Damon Cross	Recurring cast (season 5), main cast (season 6)
2019	Ryan Hansen Solves Crimes on Television	Vince Vincetti	Recurring cast (season 2)
2021	Soul of a Nation	Himself	Episode: "Shut Up And..."
2021	BMF	Pat	Recurring cast
2021	The Last O.G.	Percy	Recurring cast (season 4)
2022–2023	Winning Time: The Rise of the Lakers Dynasty	Spencer Haywood	Recurring cast
2025–present	Forever	Eric	Main role

=== Documentary ===
Year	Title
2012	Benji
