= Low-crotch pants =

Style of pants

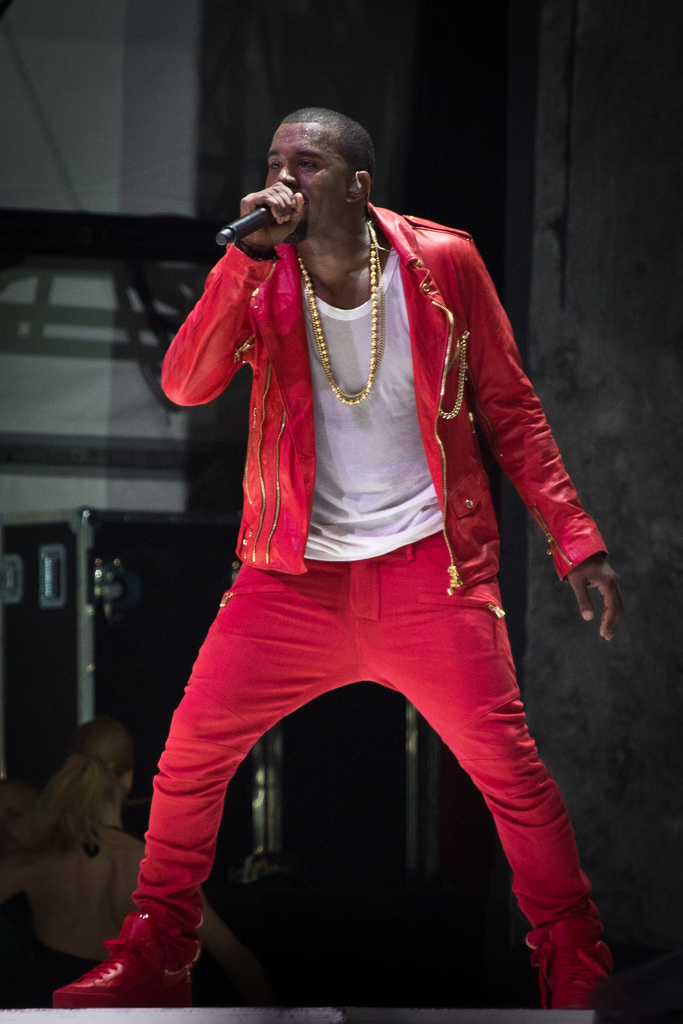
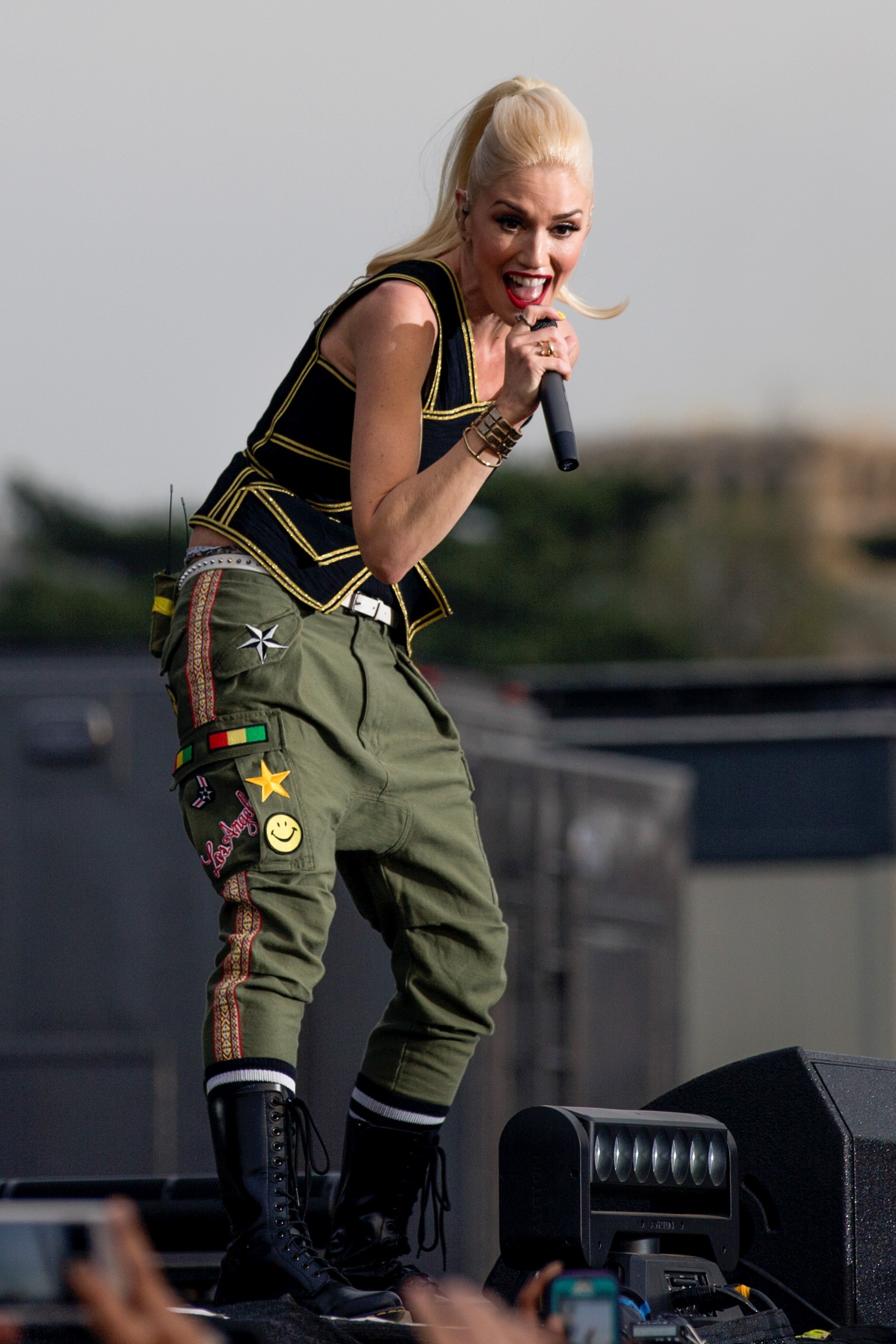
A man (Kanye West) and a woman (Gwen Stefani) wearing low-crotch pants

Low-crotch pants, also known as drop-crotch pants, are a type of pants with the crotch of trousers designed to sag down loosely toward the knees. Low-crotch pants have been available in styles for both men and women but the skinny-legged, dropped-crotch types of jeans and pants rose to popularity in the 2010s.

== Terminology ==
A style of trousers with extra room in the crotch region.

== History ==
A modernized reimagined version of harem pants and sirwal, designers were pegging the junction of seams that forms the crotch on stretch fabric pants, somewhere in the mid to upper-thigh range, featuring a tapered skinny leg fitting with extra slouch around the bottom and crotch area.

== Styles ==
The skinny-legged, dropped-crotch trousers inspired by hip hop fashion made their way into mainstream street style, especially men's wear.

== See also ==
- Hammer pants
- Harem pants
