= Azie Faison =

American drug dealer and businessman

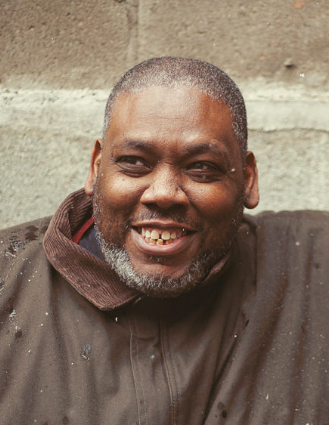
- Faison in 2022
- Born: Azie Faison Jr. November 10, 1964 (age 61); New York City, New York, U.S.
- Other names: AZ; Ace
- Occupations: Drug dealer; rapper; entrepreneur
- Children: 5

Azie Faison Jr. (born November 10, 1964), sometimes known by the nickname AZ, is an American former drug dealer and businessman from Harlem, New York City. He attained notoriety during the war on drugs era as an individual drug dealer during the 1980s. His five-year reign as a drug kingpin ended in 1989.

Born in New York City, Faison turned from selling drugs to advising youth in impoverished neighborhoods to avoid the lures of drug trafficking. Faison formed the hip-hop group MobStyle, where he released an album as a member in the 1990s, as well as a solo release. He has also been subject to various dramatic portrayals, with his legacy serving as inspiration for rap songs, documentaries, books, and notably, the 2002 film Paid in Full.

== Biography ==
=== Early life ===
Faison was born one of seven children in New York City on November 10, 1964 to Margaret Rogers and Azie Faison Sr. He lived with his single mother and six siblings in the Bronx neighborhood until 1970, where, at age six, a fire destroyed their tenement. After staying in a shelter for six months, Faison's family were then forced to relocate to the Sugar Hill neighborhood in Harlem. Faison, who struggled academically, dropped out of high school following ninth grade and worked at several odd jobs around Harlem, including a two-year stint at a local dry cleaners.

=== Career ===
After attending a screening of the 1983 film Scarface, Faison was influenced to enter the drug trade, and later that year, established a working relationship with a local Dominican supplier, who would frequently go to the dry cleaners. By the time he turned 21, Faison would transition into becoming the cocaine wholesaler in Harlem, reportedly earning $40,000 a week or more (equivalent to $120,000 in 2025). He would eventually expand operations until 1990, and became one of the most notable distributors during the war on drugs era in the United States. During this, he would become re-introduced to Rich Porter, a childhood friend who lived in the neighborhood prior to serving a sentence in prison. After his release, Porter would introduce Alpo Martinez to Faison, and the trio worked to expand operations in order to rise and become the largest distributors of cocaine in the state of New York.

However, Faison's downfall began in 1987. In the early morning hours of August 21, 1987, Faison was the victim of attempted murder after a robbery went awry at his aunt's house (which served as one of his stash houses) at 1295 Grand Concourse the Morrisania section of the Bronx which left three people dead and three others seriously injured. Faison was shot a total of nine times in the robbery attempt, and caused the drug network to falter as he aimed to recover from his injuries. This caused severe strains in the relationship between Faison, Porter, and Martinez, with the latter eventually murdering Porter in 1990, and subsequently being arrested and convicted for a plethora of charges in 1991.

=== Retirement and later life/career ===
After Porter's death, Faison effectively retired from drug dealing, and adopted a mission to steer youth away from the lure of drugs. In 1989, he formed a rap group called MobStyle, which then transitioned into a conscious hip-hop group. They released an album in 1991, while Faison also released a solo album. Faison also aimed to extend his outreach through television and media, eventually working on an autobiographical movie. The movie, titled Paid in Full, was released in 2002, with Faison being portrayed by Wood Harris.

Faison also collaborated with street documentarian Troy Reed, in order to produce a documentary about his life called Game Over, while also working with Agyei Tyehimba in order to write Game Over: The Rise and Transformation of a Harlem Hustler. The documentary and book were both released in 2007, and the latter was discussed at the Harlem Book Fair later that year, on a panel which featured co-author Tyehimba, and Congressman Charles Rangel. The discussion was broadcast live by C-SPAN's Book TV.
