= Mob Style =

American hip hop group

- Origin: Harlem, New York, U.S.
- Genres: East Coast hip hop; gangsta rap
- Years active: 1990-2003
- Labels: Grove St.; Win Time Records
- Past members: Azie Faison; Pretty Tone Capone; Gangster Lou; Whip Wop

Mob Style (or Mobstyle) was an American hip hop group from Harlem, New York, consisting of rappers A.Z. (not to be confused with later Brooklyn rapper AZ), Pretty Tone Capone, Gangster Lou and Whip Wop.

The group were among the first hip hop artists to release full-length albums independently with 1990's The Good, the Bad, the Ugly and 1992's Game of Death, at a time when major labels were the most popular way to release music.

Mob Style was one of the first New York gangsta rap groups. In the 1980s, group leader Azie "A.Z." Faison was the largest individual drug dealer in New York City.

The group reunited in 2003 to release their final album, Blood on My Money.

== Discography ==
- The Good, the Bad, the Ugly (1990)
- Game of Death (1992)
- Blood on My Money (2003)
