= Alpo Martinez =

American drug trafficker (1966–2021)

- Martinez, c. 1986.
- Born: Alberto Geddis Martinez; June 8, 1966; New York City, U.S.
- Died: October 31, 2021 (aged 55); New York City, U.S.
- Other names: Alpo Martinez; Alpo; Po; Abraham G. Rodriquez
- Occupation: Drug lord
- Status: Deceased
- Convictions: a) murder b) conspiracy to commit murder c) various drug charges
- Criminal charges: a) 14 counts b) 1 count c) several counts
- Penalty: 35–year sentence

Details
- Date apprehended: November 6, 1991

Alberto Geddis Martinez, better known as Alpo Martinez, Abraham G. Rodriquez (witness protection), or more simply as Alpo or Po (June 8, 1966 – October 31, 2021) was an American drug dealer from Harlem, New York City, of Puerto Rican descent. He rose to prominence in the mid-1980s. In addition to New York, Martinez expanded his drug trade to other cities, notably Washington, D.C.

== Biography ==
Martinez started selling drugs at 14 years old in East Harlem. In 1985, he met West Side Harlem drug dealer Azie Faison. Martinez started to move up the chain of drug dealers in Harlem and eventually became one of the biggest drug dealers in the city. Martinez later moved to Washington, D.C. in 1990 to expand operations where he quickly became involved in the city's underworld and elevated his drug activities. He met Wayne 'Silk' Perry, a notorious gangster and D.C. enforcer, who would later become his bodyguard and hitman.

== Arrest ==
On November 7, 1991, Martinez was arrested in Washington, D.C. for selling drugs. He was charged with conspiracy to commit murder, various drug charges, and 14 counts of murder, including the murder of former friend and drug dealing partner Rich Porter, D.C. drug dealer Michael Anthony Salters aka Fray and Brooklyn drug dealer Demencio Benson. Facing the possibility of either the death penalty or life imprisonment without the possibility of parole, Martinez turned informant and testified against members of his organization. For his testimony against Perry (who received five consecutive life sentences without the possibility of parole), Martinez was sentenced to 35 years in prison.

=== 2015 release ===
Martinez was released in 2015 while serving a 25-year sentence for 14 counts of murder at ADX Florence, a federal supermax prison located in Fremont County, Colorado. He was released after testifying against former associates and had been living under a United States witness protection program in Lewiston, Maine, under the assumed name, Abraham G. Rodriquez, until shortly before his death in 2021. According to the website, Martinez was in the federal witness protection program awaiting a new identity.

== Death ==
On the morning of October 31, 2021, at 3:30 a.m., Martinez was fatally shot five times in Harlem, New York, while seated in his 2017 Ram according to various media outlets including The Source magazine, Hot 97, AllHipHop and The New York Times. Shakeem Parker, 30, who was arrested in February 2022 and charged with the slaying of Martinez, was acquitted on July 13, 2024, in New York. Several media outlets reported that Martinez was killed over a road rage incident.

== In popular culture ==
Martinez was portrayed by rapper and actor Cam'ron in the 2002 film Paid In Full which was based on the criminal exploits of Martinez, Azie Faison and Rich Porter. Martinez is referenced in several hip hop and rap songs, including:

- 50 Cent – Ghetto Qu'ran
- AOTP - Digital War
- Benny The Butcher - Billy Joe
- Big L – American Dream
- Bodega Bamz – Bam Bam
- Cam'ron – Double Up
- Don Trip & Starlito – Caesar and Brutus
- Drake – Talk Up ft. Jay-Z
- Eastside 80s – Alpo
- Elcamino – Venice Beach ft. Benny the Butcher
- Elias – Alpo Martinez
- Freddie Gibbs and Madlib – Palmolive ft. Pusha T and Killer Mike
- Future – In Her Mouth
- Kanye West - KING
- The Game – Money
- The Game – My Life
- Jay-Z – La Familia
- K Koke – Why Not
- Lil Boosie – Betrayed
- Lucki - MADE MY DAY
- Meek Mill – Rich Porter
- Meek Mill – Tony Story
- Memphis Bleek – My Mind Right (Remix)
- Mysonne's "Freestyle on Funk Flex [Hot 97]"
- Nas – Memory Lane (Sittin' In Da Park)
- Nas – Accident Murderers
- Popperazzi Po – Alpo
- Pusha T – F.I.F.A.
- Shad Da God – Rich & Alpo
- Shyne – That's Gangsta
- Uncle Murda – Rap Up 2021
- Youngs Teflon & K-Trap – Alpo
- G. Twilight & Maserati Rick Jr. – Keep Em' Close
- Isha - Scanner
- Jim Jones - My Diary
- Clavish - Daily Duppy Freestyle
- Scram Jones – Memory Lane 2009 feat. Doo Wop & Nature
- Central Cee & 21 Savage - GBP
- Sir Michael Rocks, Mac Miller & Trinidad James - Lost Boys
- CyHi The Prynce - Justin Credible's Freestyle Series [Power 106 Los Angeles]
