= Paid in Full (2002 film) =

2002 film directed by Charles Stone III

- Theatrical release poster
- Directed by: Charles Stone III
- Written by: Matthew Cirulnick; Thulani Davis
- Produced by: Damon Dash; Jay-Z; Brett Ratner; Azie Faison; Steve Rifkind
- Starring: Wood Harris; Mekhi Phifer; Cam'ron
- Narrated by: Wood Harris
- Cinematography: Paul Sarossy
- Edited by: Bill Pankow; Patricia Bowers
- Music by: Vernon Reid and Frank Fitzpatrick
- Production companies: Roc-A-Fella Films; Loud Films; Rat Entertainment; Dimension Films
- Distributed by: Miramax Films
- Release date: October 25, 2002
- Running time: 98 minutes
- Country: United States
- Language: English
- Budget: $7.5 million
- Box office: $3.1 million

Paid in Full is a 2002 American crime drama film directed by Charles Stone III from a screenplay by Matthew Cirulnick and Thulani Davis. It stars Wood Harris, Mekhi Phifer and Cam'ron and is loosely based on the lives of drug dealers Azie Faison, Rich Porter, and Alpo Martinez. In the film, Ace (Harris) rises up in the Harlem drug trade while battling rivals conspiring to bring about his fall. The film bombed at the box office and received mixed reviews from critics, who praised the performances and the realistic depiction of the 1980s Harlem drug trade, but criticized the story as unoriginal. It has since developed a cult following.

== Plot ==
Ace is a young man living with his mom and sister in Harlem working at a dry cleaning shop. His sister Dora's boyfriend, Calvin, is a successful cocaine dealer while Ace's close friend Mitch is a flashy, popular drug dealer. Despite both of them promising a life of easy money, expensive cars and women, Ace decides to live a law-abiding life. While at work, Ace finds some cocaine in one of his customers' pants. The customer, Lulu, is a cocaine supplier who lets Ace keep the drug. When Calvin gets arrested on drug charges, Ace runs into one of his customers and easily sells him the cocaine for $100. Impressed, Ace goes back to Lulu for more cocaine to sell.

Lulu has a top-quality supply of cocaine which Ace sells on the street at a cheap price, quickly luring away customers from other drug dealers. Ace starts wholesaling his product to other dealers in the neighborhood, believing everyone can make money and be happy. Meanwhile, Mitch is arrested for murder. When a fight breaks out between Mitch and another inmate, Mitch is aided by East Harlem inmate Rico who impresses Mitch by his ferocity and show of support. Mitch is able to beat his murder charge and both he and Rico join Ace's drug empire when released from prison. The trio become wealthy, buying foreign cars, jewelry and expensive champagne. Ace maintains a low profile, Mitch returns to his life as a popular hustler while Rico is a ruthless enforcer who worries Ace with his overzealous, high-profile behavior. When Ace goes to Lulu's apartment, he finds Lulu dead, and takes his diamonds. After Lulu's death, Ace goes directly to his supplier for cocaine.

When Calvin is released from prison, Ace agrees to give him product to sell in his old drug spot, but Calvin quickly becomes dissatisfied with what he feels is a marginal position. When Ace refuses to let Calvin run his old block, Calvin retaliates by attempting to rob Ace at his Aunt June's apartment, holding June and June's friend Donna hostage. When Ace is unable to open the safe, June and Donna are executed by Calvin as another associate shoots Ace in the head, leaving him for dead. Ace survives as his girlfriend Keisha gives birth to his baby the same night. Feeling the physical and psychological effects of the shooting, Ace decides to quit the drug trade.

Rico tries to assuage Ace's concerns by revealing that he killed Calvin to show potential enemies that the organization is strong. Ace strongly disagrees with Rico's initiative and remains steadfast in his position to retire. Mitch understands Ace's perspective that the drug game does not reciprocate any love or generosity. Mitch decides to stay in the drug game because he loves the hustle, comparing himself to professional basketball players that continue to chase glory despite having enough money to retire. Ace decides to let Mitch and Rico take over, vowing to introduce Mitch to his drug supplier.

While Ace is recovering, Mitch's kid brother Sonny is kidnapped for ransom. Mitch reaches out to Ace, who provides him with enough cocaine to pay Sonny's ransom and allow Mitch and Rico to resume business. Mitch enlists Rico to help sell the cocaine to pay the ransom, but Rico instead kills him and steals the cocaine. Suspicious, Ace questions Rico, who claims he had not seen Mitch the day he was killed. Ace knows he's lying and settles the issue by giving him the contact to a pair of undercover FBI agents he had spoken to and avoided previously. Rico is arrested and is last seen in custody giving up information on his drug connections in Washington, D.C., in order to avoid a 25-to-life sentence. He refuses to inform on anyone in Harlem, intending on reclaiming his position when he is eventually released from prison. Sonny's kidnapping and subsequent murder were orchestrated by his own uncle who resented Mitch for not providing him with money and for kicking him out of his family's apartment. Ace retreats from the criminal underworld and makes a new life for himself and his family using Lulu's diamonds.

== Cast ==
- Wood Harris as Ace
- Mekhi Phifer as Mitch
- Cam'ron as Rico
- Kevin Carroll as Calvin
- Esai Morales as Luis "Lulu" Lujano
- Chi McBride as Pip
- Remo Green as Sonny
- Cynthia Martells as Dora
- Elise Neal as June
- Regina Hall as Keisha (based on Rich's sister Patricia "Pat" Porter)
- Ron Cephas Jones as Ice (based on Rich's uncle Johnny "Apple" Porter)
- Karen Andrew as Cakes
- Jonas Chernick as Detective / Surgeon
- Wes Williams as Mitch's Friend
- Rufus Crawford as Tommy
- Jason Burke as Street Runner
- K. C. Collins as Kid #1
- Arnold Pinnock as Wiry Man
- Noreaga as Runner
- Doug E. Fresh as Himself

== Production ==
In 2017, one of the film's producers, Damon Dash, stated that he had several "aggressive" interactions with co-producer Harvey Weinstein, one of which resulted in him slapping Weinstein.

Principal photography began in August 2000 and wrapped that September.

== Critical reception ==
The film received generally mixed reviews from critics, gaining a 53% (rotten) rating on Rotten Tomatoes based on 43 reviews. The website’s critics consensus reads, "Though well-acted and non-exploitative, Paid in Full treads a very well-worn story." On Metacritic, it has a score of 49% based on 16 reviews.

Roger Ebert gave the film 2 and a half stars out of 4, writing that the film was "ambitious, has good energy and is well-acted, but tells a familiar story in a familiar way. The parallels to Brian De Palma’s “Scarface” are underlined by scenes from that movie which are watched by the characters in this one. The trajectory is well-known: poverty, success, riches, and then death or jail." Variety gave the film a negative review, praised Stone, the film's cinematographer Paul Sarossy and production designer Maher Ahmad for creating an immersive portrayal of 1980s Harlem, but criticized the film as "downward spiral[ing] due to a weak plot and gratuitous violence."

It has gained a strong cult following amongst hip-hop fans since its release. In 2025, it was announced that 50 Cent was developing a television series based on the film, with Cam'ron attached as an executive producer.

== Soundtrack ==
The film's soundtrack, containing hip hop and R&B music, was released on October 25, 2002, by Roc-A-Fella Records and Def Jam Recordings. It peaked at 53 on the Billboard 200 and 10 on the Top R&B/Hip-Hop Albums.

== See also ==
- List of hood films
