= Sean John =

American fashion company owned by Sean Combs

Coordinates: 40°45′51.3″N 73°58′55.5″W

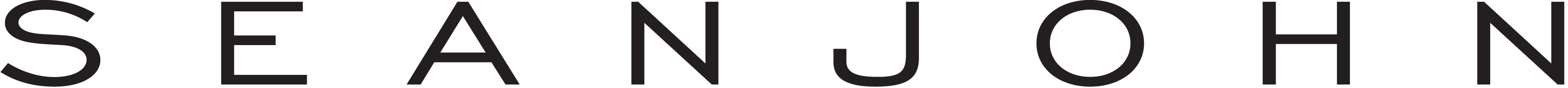
- Type: Private
- Industry: Apparel
- Founded: 1998
- Founder: Sean Combs
- Headquarters: New York City, United States
- Key people: Sean Combs (president & CEO)
- Products: Clothing, footwear, fragrances, accessories

Sean John was an American privately held fashion and lifestyle company founded by fashion designer and record producer Sean Combs. The brand launched its fashion line with a men's sportswear collection for the spring 1998 season. By 2016, Sean John achieved annual retail sales of $450 million.

== History ==
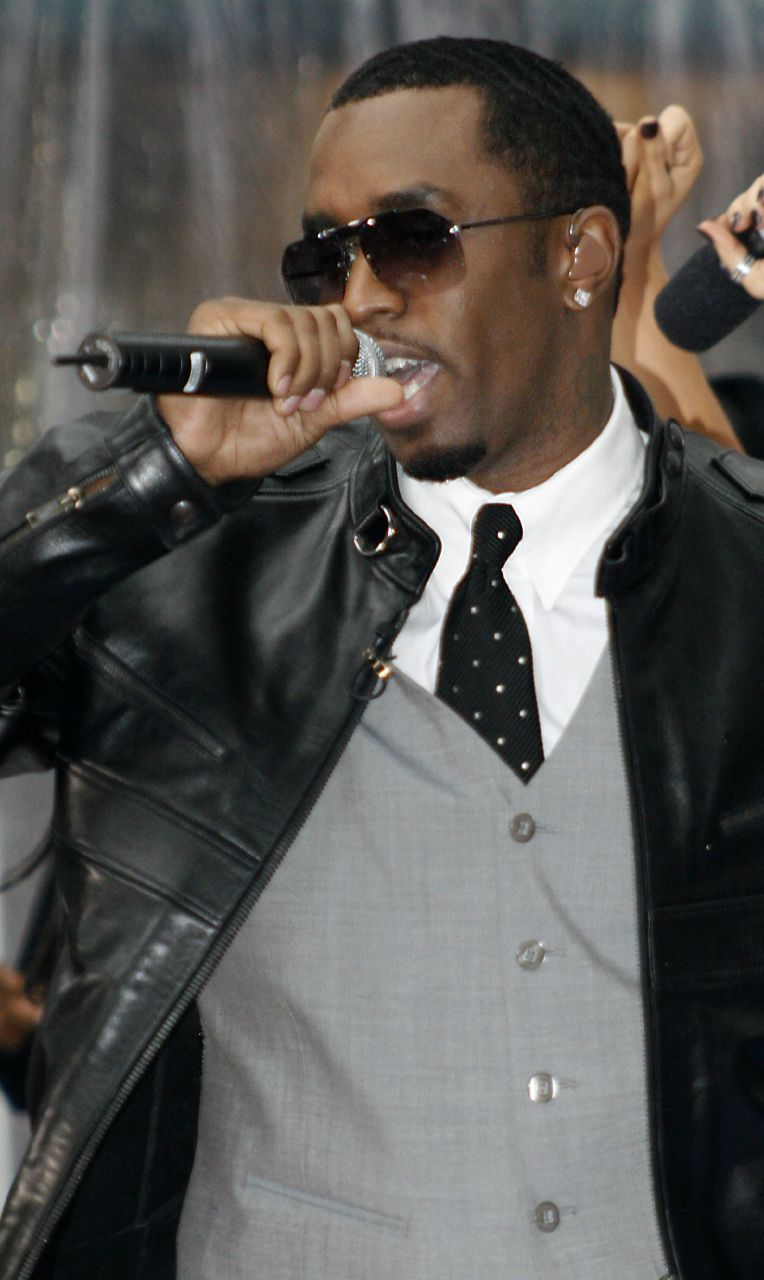
Sean Combs, founder, president, and CEO of Sean John

In 1998, American rapper and record producer Sean Combs launched a signature collection of sportswear under his given name, Sean John. The brand made its debut at retail during a launch event at Bloomingdale's in New York City. Since its launch, Sean John has enjoyed critical and commercial success with revenues now exceeding $525 million annually. Sean John has often appeared at the award ceremony for the CFDA Fashion Awards held annually in New York. For five consecutive years, from 2000 to 2005, Sean John was nominated for its excellence in design. In 2004, Sean John was awarded the CFDA Men's Designer of the Year award.

In February 2001, Sean John produced the first nationally televised runway show during New York Fashion Week when it simultaneously aired live on E! Television and the Style Network. During fashion week in February 2002, the New York Times ran a front page story on Sean John.

Sean John's SS'14 Brand Campaign, DREAM BIG

In 2004, Sean John invested in the high-end label Zac Posen.

In October 2008, the company purchased streetwear lifestyle brand Enyce from Liz Claiborne for $20 million.

Combs' FIFI Award-winning perfume, Unforgivable, was joined by Sean John fragrance I AM KING in November 2008.

In May 2010, Sean John made a distribution agreement with Macy's department store in which Macy's and Macys.com would be the sole distributor of Sean John sportswear at the retail and online level. As part of this agreement, Sean John and Macy's expanded the Sean John brand's distribution to many more Macy's stores and entered into exclusive marketing partnerships with the NBA. In November 2023, it was announced that Macy's was pulling all Sean John clothing from their department and online stores, due to Combs' sexual assault allegations, effectively ending their partnership with Combs.

After having previously sold a 90% stake in Sean John to Global Brands Group in 2016, in December 2021, Sean Combs purchased Sean John back from Global Brands Group for $7.5 million, following the company's bankruptcy.

The last known collaboration with Sean John involves a limited time partnership with Kanye West available on Yeezy.com from February 7th until February 12th of 2025.
