= Color-blocking =

Artistic technique

Color-blocking is thought of as the exploration of taking colors that are opposites on the color wheel and pairing them together to make complementary color combinations. It is commonly associated in fashion as a trend that originated from the artwork of Dutch painter, Piet Mondrian. However, other experts argue whether his artwork is the true origin of color-blocking.

== History ==
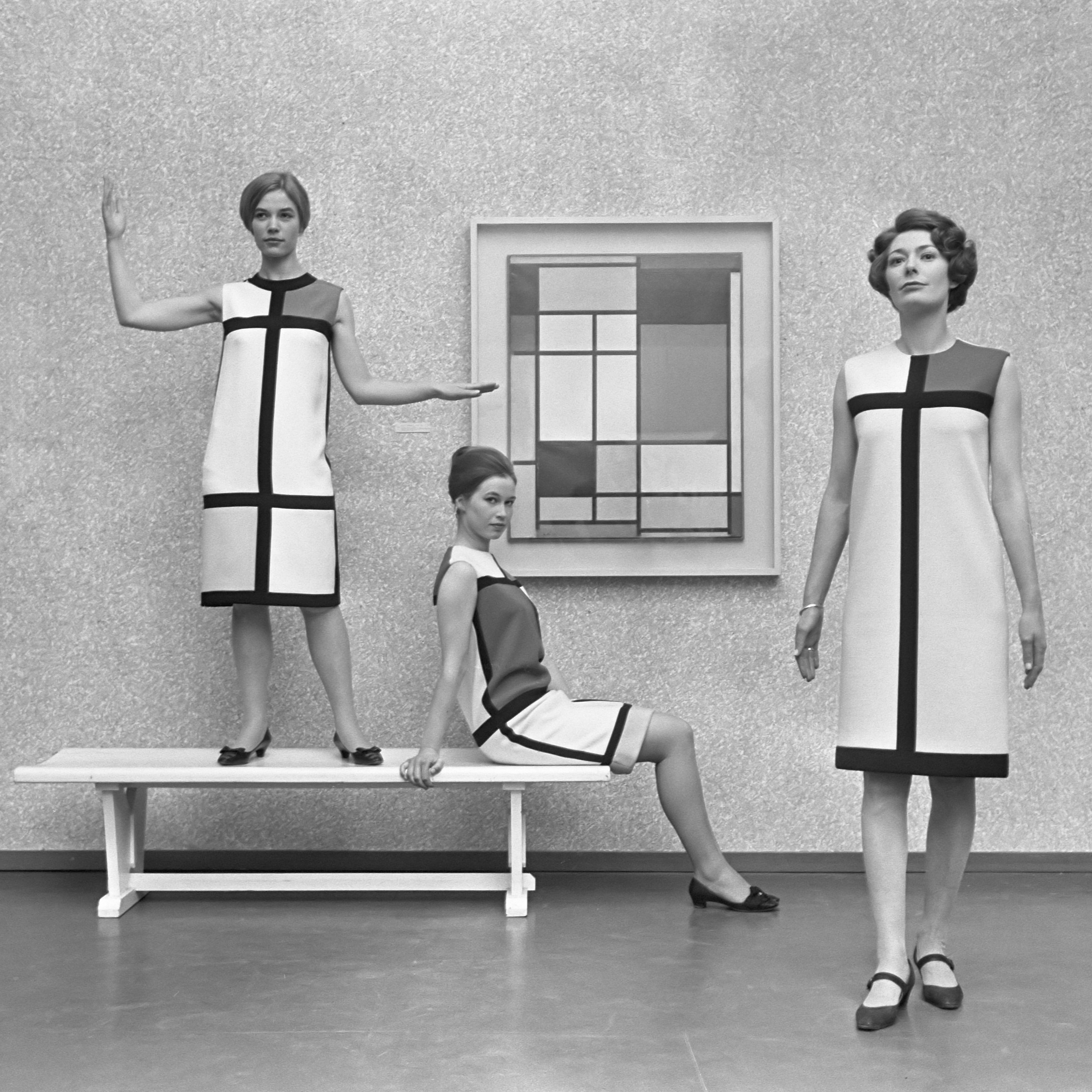
Mondrian dresses by Yves Saint Laurent

It is widely believed by most historians that Piet Mondrian—an artist who lived around 1900 and whose paintings were a collection of stark lines and flat squares—inspired the current color-blocking trend. Mondrian valued simplicity and, as a result, experimented with how far he could simplify his work, maximizing simplicity while still maintaining recognizable, although abstract, geometric shapes. Mondrian later named this style of painting Neo-Plasticism. In Piet Mondrian's Neoplasticism movement, his art directly inspired the fashion world, as well as home décor and baked goods. Although Mondrian is said to be the key figure of the modern art movement, there are others who believe the credit for this trend lies with Georges Seurat and Claude Monet. However, sources report that it is Piet Mondrian who inspired other designers such as Yves Saint Laurent to create the famous Mondrian Dresses. Before Mondrian's aesthetic overtook the fashion world, pop art's materialization in the 50s opened America's eyes to a more vibrant but structured world. Pop Art incorporated the same clean lines and solid colors that Piet Mondrian's work encompassed. Proponents of the Georges Seurat and Monet origin theory claim that this novel acceptance led to the color-blocking revolution. Mondrian's Neo-Plasticism aesthetic evolved through the decades, coming to include aspects such as synthetic color and a strong imposed structure in the 1960s. The color-blocking trend took off in the '60s as fashion designers like Yves Saint Laurent adopted this aesthetic. It was not long before this new trend was reaching as far as London; the youth of London began wearing ensembles that would come to be known as mod fashion. Mod fashion much resembled the artistic style of Piet Mondrian; mismatched, solid color separates that were composed of blocks in different hues.

Color-blocking resurfaced in the 2010s as a trend in domestic interior design. Although some argue that color-blocking is a thing of the past, high fashion figures and enthusiasts believe that this trend continues to thrive as a result of the hipster generation who revive the trend and turn it into something seen as fashion-forward.

Some elements of Native American Hopi traditional dress and ceremonial designs, such as the traditional Kachina rituals and dolls, evoke color blocking themes.

== Process ==
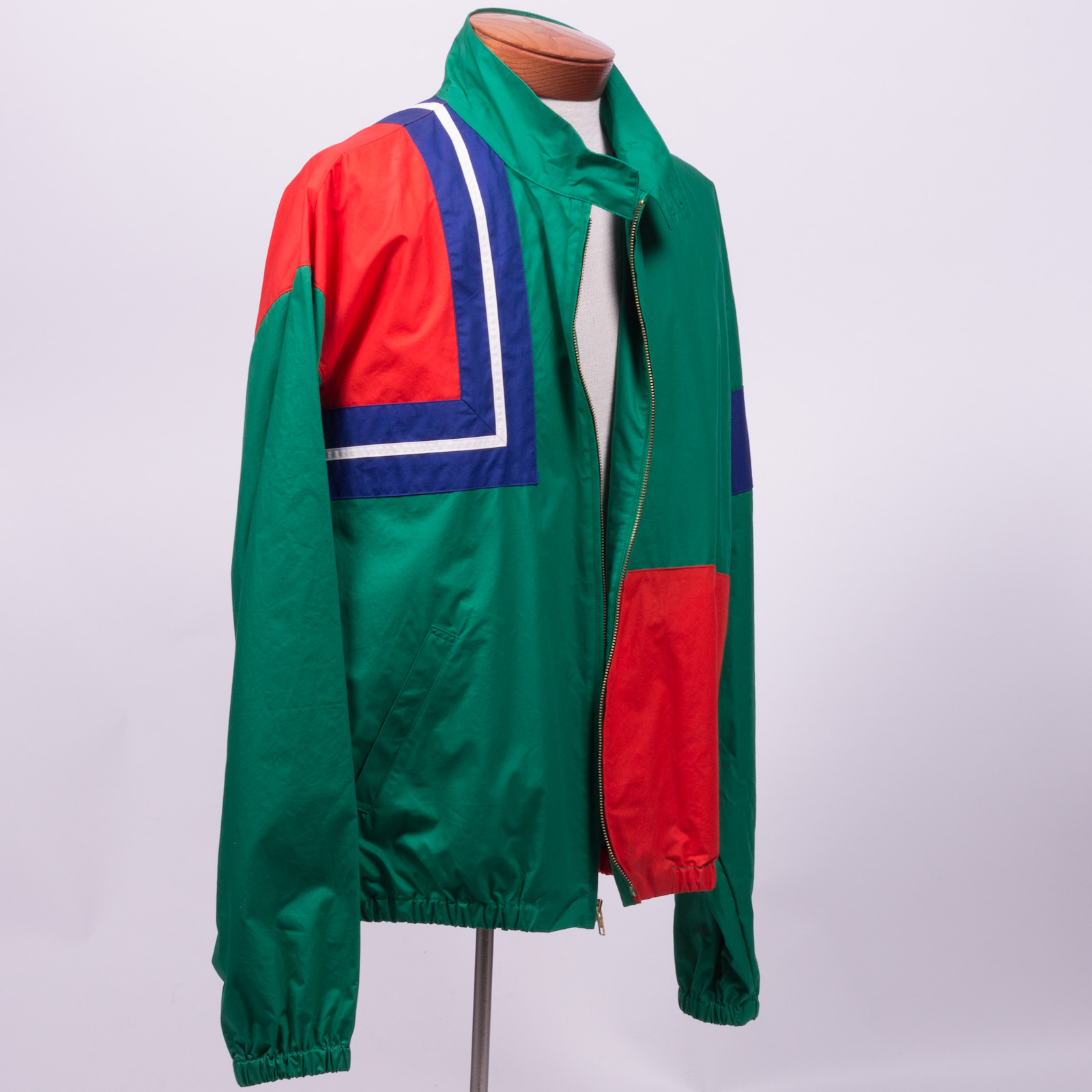
Polo Ralph Lauren color block windbreaker jacket

In the fashion world, the process of color-blocking refers to wearing blocks of colors. Color-blocking is different from how people usually dress, because the colors in the outfit are considered louder, or colors that clash. Fashion figures explain color-blocking as wearing multiple articles of solid-colored clothing in a single outfit. Traditional color-blocking consists of putting two or three different but complementary colors together in one outfit. It is also considered color-blocking even if the colors are not direct opposites on the color wheel. For example, yellow and orange are right next to each other, but adding purple (a color on the opposite of the wheel) creates a color-blocked outfit.

== Rules ==
Fashion icons, designers, and figures have developed rules that go along with the art of color-blocking. Basic rules for color-blocking are centered on color theory. There are unwritten rules in color-blocking, such as not wearing too many colors together at once, and balancing an outfit with a neutral such as grey.

== Interior design ==
Color-blocking has recently spilled over into home décor and interior design. This trend takes the same idea in home design that it does in fashion: the colors are paired with no concern of matching. In the home color-blocking is used mainly in room décor and walls. Décor clashing with each other, or in more mild cases the opposite colors complement each other to provide an interesting and refreshing atmosphere in a room.
