= Enyce =

American fashion house

- Industry: Clothing; Fashion
- Founded: 1996
- Founders: Evan Davis; Lando Felix; Tony Shellman
- Headquarters: New York City
- Key people: Sean Combs

Enyce ([NYC]) is an American hip-hop fashion label owned by rapper and record producer Sean Combs. The label was established in New York City in March 1996 by Evan Davis, Lando Felix and Tony Shellman. The co-founders had originally met while working for Seattle-based clothing brand International News. Liz Claiborne acquired the company in February 2004 for $114 million from Sports Brands International. In October 2008, Enyce was purchased by Combs and Sean John for $20 million.

Many have mispronounced the brand name over the years. The pronunciation originates from the phonetic spelling of "NYC" (en-y-ce) but sounded out in an Italian fashion. This was because the company started under Fila, an Italian-based company. Employees asked how they would pronounce the word replied "en-ne-che", making it the "correct" way to say the brand.

Enyce specializes in old school clothing, with an emphasis on puffy jackets and jerseys with their logos on them. They also seem to have an official Instagram account, which is owned and operated by Combs. The account became inactive in 2016.

== Clothing lines ==
- Enyce
- Lady Houy
