= Bad Boys (franchise) =

Multimedia franchise

- Created by: George Gallo
- Original work: Bad Boys
- Owner: Columbia Pictures (Sony Pictures Entertainment)
- Years: 1995–present

Films and television
- Film(s): Bad Boys (1995); Bad Boys II (2003); Bad Boys for Life (2020); Bad Boys: Ride or Die (2024)
- Television series: L.A.'s Finest (2019–2020)

Games
- Video game(s): Bad Boys: Miami Takedown (2004)

Audio
- Soundtrack(s): Bad Boys (1995); Bad Boys II (2003); Bad Boys for Life (2020); Bad Boys: Ride or Die (2024)

Bad Boys is an American series of action comedy films starring Will Smith and Martin Lawrence as two detectives in the Miami Police Department, Mike Lowrey and Marcus Burnett. The series was created by George Gallo. Apart from Smith and Lawrence, Joe Pantoliano appears in all four films, and Theresa Randle appears in the first three films before being replaced by Tasha Smith in the fourth film. Michael Bay directed the first two films and Adil & Bilall directed the third and fourth. Gabrielle Union, who starred in the second installment, later starred alongside Jessica Alba in a spin-off television series, L.A.'s Finest.

The series has grossed over $1 billion worldwide. The first and fourth films received mixed reviews from critics, the second was unfavorably received and the third had a generally positive reception.

== Films ==
=== Bad Boys (1995) ===
Detectives Mike Lowrey and Marcus Burnett have 72 hours to find $100 million worth of heroin before Internal Affairs shuts them down. Mike becomes more involved after a friend is murdered by the drug dealers. Matters become complicated when Mike and Marcus have to switch places to convince a witness of the murder to cooperate.

Principal photography began on June 27 in downtown Miami and wrapped August 31, 1994.

=== Bad Boys II (2003) ===
Mike and Marcus head up a task force investigating the flow of ecstasy into Miami. Their search leads to a dangerous kingpin Johnny Tapia, whose plan to control the city's drug traffic has touched off an underground war. Meanwhile, Mike and Syd, Marcus's sister, are in a secret relationship.

=== Bad Boys for Life (2020) ===
In June 2008, Michael Bay stated that he might direct Bad Boys for Life, but that the greatest obstacle to the potential sequel would be the cost, as he and Will Smith demand some of the highest salaries in the film industry. By August 2009, Columbia Pictures had hired Peter Craig to write the script for Bad Boys III. In February 2011, Martin Lawrence reiterated that the film was in development. In June 2014, Jerry Bruckheimer announced that screenwriter David Guggenheim was working on the storyline for the sequel. Two months later, Lawrence said a script had been written and parts had been cast. By June 2015, director Joe Carnahan was in early talks to write and possibly direct the film. Two months later, Sony Pictures Entertainment announced that Bad Boys III would be released on February 17, 2017. On March 4, 2016, the film was pushed to June 2, 2017. Producers had planned to begin production in early 2017.

On August 11, 2016, the film was pushed back once again to January 12, 2018, to avoid box office competition with the upcoming DC Comics film Wonder Woman, and retitled Bad Boys for Life. Lawrence revealed on Jimmy Kimmel Live! that filming may start in March 2017. On March 7, 2017, Carnahan left the film due to scheduling conflicts, and in August 2017 Sony removed the film from their release schedule. In August 2017, Lawrence said that he doubted that the film would ever be made. During an appearance on Australian breakfast show Sunrise on January 15, 2018, Will Smith told hosts Samantha Armytage and David Koch that a third film was coming "very soon". On January 30, 2018, it was announced that Sony Pictures were in negotiations with Adil El Arbi and Bilall Fallah to direct the upcoming third entry in the Bad Boys franchise titled Bad Boys for Life with a possible production date in August 2018. Sony is reportedly gearing up for the long-awaited third installment to begin filming in November 2018 and wrap in March 2019.

In November 2018, Martin Lawrence officially revealed via Instagram that he and co-star Will Smith would return for a sequel. Joe Pantoliano is also set to reprise his role as Captain Howard. Vanessa Hudgens, Alexander Ludwig and Charles Melton were announced in the cast on December 20, 2018. Jacob Scipio and Paola Nuñez were announced in the cast on December 21, 2018. Filming began on January 7, 2019.

=== Bad Boys: Ride or Die (2024) ===
In January 2020, a fourth film entered development, with Chris Bremner serving as screenwriter. Smith and Lawrence reprised their roles from the previous three movies. In April 2022, production for the film was reportedly halted due to the incident with Smith slapping Chris Rock at the 2022 Academy Awards ceremony and the subsequent investigation. In February 2023, Smith announced that the fourth film was in pre-production. That same month, it was reported by musician/disc jockey Questlove that Smith had to drop out of a planned surprise appearance at the 65th Grammy Awards because filming for the fourth Bad Boys film had started earlier that week. Principal photography began on April 3, 2023 in Atlanta, Georgia. The film was released in the United States on June 7, 2024.

=== Future ===
In June 2024, Smith and Lawrence told Entertainment Weekly that they would be open to return for a fifth film in the franchise, as long as the younger cast members do more stunts and there's a story involving their characters worth being told, with Lawrence also noting it would depend on whether the fans demanded more films. On June 11, 2024, producer Jerry Bruckheimer noted that there had been discussions for a fifth Bad Boys film, but they were primarily waiting to see how Bad Boys: Ride or Die performed at the box office.

== Television ==
Series	Season	Episodes	First released	Last released	Showrunner(s)	Network(s)
L.A.'s Finest	1	13	May 13, 2019	June 17, 2019	Brandon Sonnier & Brandon Margolis	Charter Spectrum
L.A.'s Finest	2	13	September 9, 2020		Brandon Sonnier & Brandon Margolis	Charter Spectrum

=== L.A.'s Finest (2019–2020) ===
In October 2017, a spinoff television series centered on Gabrielle Union's character, was announced to be in development by Brandon Margolis and Brandon Sonnier. Later that month NBC ordered the pilot episode of the series. By March 2018, Jessica Alba was cast as the co-star with Gabrielle Union. In addition to Union, John Salley will also reprise his role as Fletcher, a computer hacker who helps Mike and Marcus in the film series. The following month, the title of the series was revealed as LA's Finest, with Jerry Bruckheimer serving as executive producer for the series. Later that month, NBC passed on the pilot, and the show was shopped around to other networks. NBC's boss, Bob Greenblatt, said: "These are all tough calls. We did have an embarrassment of riches. And when we laid out the schedule and the calendar all season...it was a show that didn't fit in the grand scheme of it."

That same month, it was revealed that Sony Pictures Television, was negotiating with Charter Communications about picking up the series. By June 2018, Canada's Bell Media picked it up for 13 episodes. Charter gave its series order on June 26, intent on making it Spectrum's first original series. In June 2019, the series was renewed for the second season.

== Cast and crew ==
=== Cast ===
List indicators

This section includes characters who will appear or have appeared in the franchise.

- An empty grey cell indicates the character was not in the film, or that the character's official presence has not yet been confirmed.
- ^{C} indicates a cameo role.
- ^{G} indicates a guest appearance in the season.
- ^{M} indicates an appearance in onscreen movie footage.
- ^{R} indicates a recurring role in the season.
- ^{Y} indicates a younger version of the character.

Characters		Films				Television series
Characters		Bad Boys	Bad Boys II	Bad Boys for Life	Bad Boys: Ride or Die	L.A.'s Finest
Characters		1995	2003	2020	2024	2019–2020
Detective Sergeant / Lieutenant Marcus Miles Burnett I		Martin Lawrence	Martin Lawrence	Martin Lawrence	Martin Lawrence	Krystian Alexander Lyttle^{Y}
Detective Sergeant / Lieutenant Michael Eugene “Mike” Lowrey		Will Smith	Will Smith	Will Smith	Will Smith	
Theresa Burnett		Theresa Randle	Theresa Randle	Theresa Randle	Tasha Smith	
Megan Burnett		Tiffany Samuels	Bianca Bethune	Bianca Bethune	Bianca Bethune	
Fletcher		John Salley	John Salley		John Salley	John Salley^{R}
Captain Conrad Howard		Joe Pantoliano	Joe Pantoliano	Joe Pantoliano	Joe Pantoliano	
James Burnett		Cory Hodges	Cory Hodges	Cory Hodges^{P}		
Quincy Burnett		Scott Cumberbatch	Scott Cumberbatch	Scott Cumberbatch^{P}		
Julie Mott		Téa Leoni				
Antoine Fouchet		Tchéky Karyo				
Detective Sanchez		Nestor Serrano				
Detective Ruiz		Julio Oscar Mechoso				
Captain Alison Sinclair		Marg Helgenberger				
Staff Sergeant Reggie Norman			Dennis Greene	Dennis Greene	Dennis Greene	Jeremy Batiste^{G}
Special Agent / Detective Lieutenant Sydney "Syd" Burnett			Gabrielle Union	Mentioned	Mentioned	Gabrielle Union^{M} Kyrie Mcalpin^{Y}
Car Driver / Wedding MC / Porsche Driver			Michael Bay^{C}	Michael Bay^{C}	Michael Bay^{C}	
Hector Juan Carlos "Johnny" Tapia			Jordi Mollà			
Alexei			Peter Stormare			
Carlos			Otto Sanchez			
Roberto			Jon Seda			
Floyd Poteet			Michael Shannon			
Secret Agent Armando Armas Lowrey				Jacob Scipio	Jacob Scipio	
AMMO	Captain Rita Secada			Paola Núñez	Paola Núñez	
AMMO	Kelly			Vanessa Hudgens	Vanessa Hudgens	
AMMO	Dorn			Alexander Ludwig	Alexander Ludwig	
AMMO	Rafe			Charles Melton		
Isabel Aretas				Kate del Castillo		
Lorenzo 'Zway-Lo' Rodríguez				Nicky Jam		
Manny the Butcher				DJ Khaled	DJ Khaled	
Joseph Burnett-Vaughn			Mentioned		Mentioned	Ernie Hudson^{M}
James McGrath					Eric Dane	
Adam Lockwood					Ioan Gruffudd	
US Marshall Agent Judy Howard					Rhea Seehorn	
Christine Lowrey					Melanie Liburd	
Tabitha					Tiffany Haddish	
Callie Howard					Quinn Hemphill	
Detective Lieutenant Dolores "Nancy" McKenna (née Perez)						Jessica Alba^{M} Veronica Diaz Carranza^{Y}
The Bens	Detective Lieutenant Benjamin "Ben" Baines					Duane Martin^{M}
The Bens	Detective Lieutenant Benjamin "Ben" Walker					Zach Gilford^{M} Brayden Scott^{Y}
Katherine "Kat" Vaughn-Miller						Tamala Jones^{R}
Bishop Duvall						Jake Busey^{R}
Isabel "Izzy" McKenna						Sophie Reynolds^{M}
Dr. Patrick McKenna						Ryan McPartlin^{M}
Dante Sherman						Barry Sloane^{R} Tyler Perez^{Y}
Raymond "Ray" Sherman						Zach McGowan^{G} Dylan McNamara^{Y}

=== Crew ===
Film	U.S. release date	Director(s)	Screenwriter(s)	Story by	Producer(s)
Bad Boys	April 7, 1995	Michael Bay	Jim Mulholland, Michael Barrie & Doug Richardson	George Gallo	Don Simpson & Jerry Bruckheimer
Bad Boys II	July 18, 2003	Michael Bay	Ron Shelton & Jerry Stahl	Ron Shelton, Cormac Wibberley & Marianne Wibberley	Jerry Bruckheimer
Bad Boys for Life	January 17, 2020	Adil El Arbi & Bilall Fallahl	Peter Craig, Joe Carnahan & Chris Bremner	Peter Craig & Joe Carnahan	Jerry Bruckheimer, Will Smith & Doug Belgrad
Bad Boys: Ride or Die	June 7, 2024	Adil El Arbi & Bilall Fallahl	Chris Bremner & Will Beall	Chris Bremner & Will Beall	Chad Oman, Doug Belgrad, Will Smith & Jerry Bruckheimer

=== Additional crew ===
Occupation	Films			
Occupation	Bad Boys	Bad Boys II	Bad Boys for Life	Bad Boys: Ride or Die
Occupation	1995	2003	2020	2024
Composer	Mark Mancina	Trevor Rabin	Lorne Balfe	Lorne Balfe
Director of photography	Howard Atherton	Amir Mokri	Robrecht Heyvaert	Robrecht Heyvaert
Editor(s)	Christian Wagner	Roger Barton; Mark Goldblatt; Thomas A. Muldoon	Dan Lebental; Peter McNulty	Asaf Eisenberg; Dan Lebental
Production companies	Columbia Pictures; Don Simpson/Jerry Bruckheimer Films	Columbia Pictures; Don Simpson/Jerry Bruckheimer Films	Columbia Pictures; 2.0 Entertainment; Overbrook Entertainment; Don Simpson/Jerry Bruckheimer Films	Columbia Pictures; 2.0 Entertainment; Westbrook Studios; Don Simpson/Jerry Bruckheimer Films
Distributed by	Sony Pictures Releasing	Sony Pictures Releasing	Sony Pictures Releasing	Sony Pictures Releasing
Release date	April 7, 1995	July 18, 2003	January 17, 2020	June 7, 2024
Running time	119 minutes	147 minutes	124 minutes	115 minutes

== Reception ==
=== Box office performance ===
Film	Release date	Box office gross			Box office ranking		Budget	Ref.
Film	Release date	North America	Other territories	Worldwide	All time North America	All time worldwide	Budget	Ref.
Bad Boys	April 7, 1995	$65,807,024	$75,600,000	$141,407,024	#1,366 (#922^{(A)})	#1,354 (#971^{(A)})	$19 million	
Bad Boys II	July 18, 2003	$138,608,444	$134,731,112	$273,340,010	#480 (#461^{(A)})	#625 (#524^{(A)})	$130 million	
Bad Boys for Life	January 17, 2020	$206,305,244	$220,200,000	$426,505,244	#226 (#490^{(A)})	#331	$90 million	
Bad Boys: Ride or Die	June 7, 2024	$193,544,038	$208,985,000	$402,529,038	#353 (#901^{(A)})	#486	$100 million	
Total		$604,062,750	$637,631,112	$1,241,694,316			$339 million	
List indicator^{(A)} indicates the adjusted totals based on current ticket prices (calculated by Box Office Mojo).

=== Critical and audience response ===
Title	Rotten Tomatoes	Metacritic	CinemaScore
Bad Boys	44% (68 reviews)	41 (24 reviews)	A
Bad Boys II	24% (186 reviews)	38 (34 reviews)	A
L.A.'s Finest (season 1–2)	24% (17 reviews)	50 (8 reviews)	—N/a
Bad Boys for Life	76% (267 reviews)	59 (46 reviews)	A
Bad Boys: Ride or Die	65% (245 reviews)	54 (50 reviews)	A−

== Music ==
=== Soundtracks ===
Title	U.S. release date	Length	Performed by	Label
Bad Boys (Music from the Motion Picture)	March 21, 1995	1:00:01	Various Artists	Work
Bad Boys II (The Soundtrack)	July 15, 2003	59:10	Various Artists	Bad Boy; Universal
Bad Boys (Original Score from the Motion Picture)	September 26, 2007	70:32	Mark Mancina	La-La Land
Bad Boys II (Original Motion Picture Score)	March 2, 2026	2:15:29	Trevor Rabin	La-La Land
Bad Boys for Life (The Soundtrack)	January 17, 2020	30:56	Various Artists	We the Best; Epic
Bad Boys for Life (Original Motion Picture Score)	January 24, 2020	39:48	Lorne Balfe	Sony Classical
LA' s Finest: Season Two (Original Score from the Television Series)	September 11, 2020	52:23	Jeff Cardoni	Madison Gate
LA' s Finest: Season One (Original Score from the Television Series)	September 25, 2020	44:18	Raphael Saadiq; Laura Karpman	Madison Gate
Bad Boys: Ride or Die (The Soundtrack)	June 7, 2024	24:46	Various Artists	Epic
Bad Boys: Ride or Die (Original Motion Picture Score)	June 7, 2024	47:40	Lorne Balfe	Sony Classical

=== Singles ===
Title	U.S. release date	Length	Artist(s)	Label	Film
"La-La-La"	April 29, 2003	3:54	Jay-Z	Bad Boy; Universal; Roc-A-Fella; Def Jam	Bad Boys II
"Shake Ya Tailfeather"	June 29, 2003	4:53	Nelly, P. Diddy and Murphy Lee	Bad Boy; Universal	Bad Boys II
"Show Me Your Soul"	December 15, 2003	5:20	P. Diddy, Lenny Kravitz, Pharrell Williams and Loon	Bad Boy; Universal	Bad Boys II
"Ritmo"	October 11, 2019	3:42	Black Eyed Peas and J Balvin	Epic	Bad Boys for Life
"Muévelo"	January 8, 2020	3:15	Nicky Jam and Daddy Yankee	Epic	Bad Boys for Life
"Tonight"	May 10, 2024	3:38	Black Eyed Peas and El Alfa featuring Becky G	Epic	Bad Boys: Ride or Die

== Video games ==
Bad Boys: Miami Takedown, is a video game released in 2004 based on the sequel Bad Boys II. It was released in early 2004 after the film's DVD and VHS release.
