= L.A.'s Finest =

American police procedural drama television series

- Genre: Action; Drama; Police procedural
- Created by: Brandon Margolis; Brandon Sonnier
- Based on: Characters by George Gallo
- Starring: Gabrielle Union; Jessica Alba; Duane Martin; Zach Gilford; Ryan McPartlin; Sophie Reynolds; Ernie Hudson
- Theme music composer: Laura Karpman
- Composers: Laura Karpman (season 1); Raphael Saadiq (season 1); Jeff Cardoni (season 2)
- Country of origin: United States
- Original language: English
- No. of seasons: 2
- No. of episodes: 26

Production
- Executive producers: Gabrielle Union; Jessica Alba; Brandon Margolis; Brandon Sonnier; Pam Veasey; Doug Belgrad; Jerry Bruckheimer; Jonathan Littman; KristieAnne Reed; Jeff Gaspin; Jeff Morrone; Anton Cropper
- Production companies: Don Simpson/Jerry Bruckheimer Films (Note: Jerry Bruckheimer Films used the Don Simpson/Jerry Bruckheimer Films logo in memory of Don Simpson, who co-produced the first Bad Boys film.); 2.0 Entertainment; The Brandons; Green Eggs and Pam Productions; Sony Pictures Television Studios (Note: Credited as Sony Pictures Television for season 1 and the first seven episodes of season 2.)

Original release
- Network: Spectrum
- Release: May 13, 2019 – September 9, 2020

L.A.'s Finest (also known colloquially as Bad Girls) is an American action crime drama television series created by Brandon Margolis and Brandon Sonnier; and produced by Sony Pictures Television. It is a spin-off of the Bad Boys franchise created by George Gallo, starring Gabrielle Union reprising her role from Bad Boys II (2003), opposite Jessica Alba and an ensemble cast.

The series premiered on Spectrum on May 13, 2019. L.A.'s Finest is the first premium content show made for the cable provider and the debut of its Spectrum Originals banner of exclusive programming. The second season premiered on September 9, 2020. The first season of the series had its American broadcast television premiere on Fox on September 21, 2020. In October 2020, the series was formally announced as cancelled by Spectrum after the second season.

== Cast and characters ==
=== Main ===
- Gabrielle Union as Detective Lieutenant Sydney "Syd" Burnett, an ex-DEA special agent who has transferred to the LAPD's Robbery-Homicide Division, and is Nancy McKenna's new partner. She is the sister of Marcus Burnett from the Bad Boys films.
- Jessica Alba as Detective Nancy McKenna, a working stepmother, and secretly a former career criminal when she was Nancy Perez, who is Syd's new partner in the LAPD. Prior to the LAPD, Nancy served in the U.S. Navy as an Explosive Ordnance Disposal technician and was awarded both the Navy Cross and Purple Heart (per season 2).
- Duane Martin as Ben Baines, a fellow detective and one of "The Bens"
- Zach Gilford as Ben Walker a fellow detective and one of "The Bens"
- Ryan McPartlin as Patrick McKenna, Nancy's husband, and a Los Angeles assistant district attorney who is subsequently named interim district attorney
- Sophie Reynolds as Isabel "Izzy" McKenna, Nancy's stepdaughter and Patrick's daughter
- Ernie Hudson as Joseph Vaughn, Marcus and Syd's estranged father and an ex-LAPD cop

=== Recurring ===
- John Salley as Fletcher, a computer hacker that Syd knows from her time in Miami
- Barry Sloane as Dante Sherman (season 1), the brother of club owner and gangster Ray Sherman who knows Nancy McKenna from her criminal past
- Sabina Gadecki as Jen, a sex worker with whom Syd forms an attachment
- David Fumero as Lt. Jason Calloway, an LAPD lieutenant with the Narcotics Division and a colleague of Syd's
- Jordan Rodrigues as Arlo Bates (season 1), who works for crime boss Gabriel Knox and is tasked with finding the fentanyl that was intercepted by Syd
- Joshua Alba as Nico Perez, Nancy McKenna's younger brother
- Ciara Riley Wilson as Letti Ramirez, Izzy's friend
- Rebecca Budig as Carlene Hart (season 1), a for-hire "fixer" who secretly works for Gabriel Knox and pressures Arlo to find the missing drugs; she is also a suburban mom and a senior-level drug trafficker in LA
- Tamala Jones as Katherine Vaughn Miller (season 1), a jewelry store employee whom Arlo targets due to her surprising connection to Syd
- Laz Alonso as Warren Hendrix (season 1), as Syd's former DEA colleague and lover
- Curtis Harris as Justice Baines (season 1), Ben Baines' son and Izzy's friend
- Jake Busey as Bishop Duvall (season 1), a crime lord
- Kelly Hu as Angela Turner (season 2)
- Timothy V. Murphy as Logan Kline (season 2)
- Adam Rose as Nathan Baker
- Miguel Gomez as Ricky Leon
- Taylor Black as Emma Mitchell
- Kurt Yaeger as Clete Winslow
- Beau Knapp as Malcolm Ward
- D. J. Cotrona as Luca Verone
- Kelly Rowland as Faith Baines, Ben Baines' wife

=== Notable guest stars ===
- Zach McGowan as Ray Sherman, Dante's brother who owns a nightclub and is involved in criminal activities (in "Pilot" and "Con Air")
- Rebecca Field as Alice Kensler, the drunk driver who killed Izzy's mother (in "Armageddon" and "Bad Girls")
- Eddie Cahill as Michael Alber, director of DEA Special Operations (in "Armageddon" and "Bad Girls")
- Sharon Lawrence as Gloria Walker (in "Beverly Hills Cops" and "Bad Company")
- Orlando Jones as Lt. Marshawn Davis (in "Coyote Ugly", "Drum line","Deliver Us from Evil", and "For Life")
- Hayley Erin as Desiree Roberts (in "Beverly Hills Cops")
- Krystian Alexander Lyttle as Marcus Burnett, a younger version of Syd's brother, portrayed by Martin Lawrence in the Bad Boys films

== Episodes ==
Season	Episodes	Originally released	
Season	Episodes	First released	Last released
1	13	May 13, 2019	June 17, 2019
2	13	September 9, 2020	

=== Season 1 (2019) ===
No. overall	No. in season	Title	Directed by	Written by	Original release date
1	1	"Pilot"	Anton L. Cropper	Brandon Margolis & Brandon Sonnier	May 13, 2019
LAPD detectives Syd Burnett and Nancy McKenna are assigned to protect Kyle Smith, a young boy who happens to be the only witness to a murder committed by Frank Cruz, an enforcer for the Garza cartel. After Cruz tries to abduct Kyle, Syd leaves McKenna to watch over him while she goes to visit her estranged father Joseph for information on Gabriel Knox, who left her for dead during a botched undercover operation while she was with the DEA. Syd goes to see Knox's business partner Ray Sherman, but McKenna is forced to intervene when his bodyguards hold her at gunpoint. Cruz takes Kyle hostage; the LAPD learn that his mother Claire, an employee of the cartel's banker, froze one of their accounts. McKenna impersonates Claire to get Cruz to agree to a hostage exchange, but he tries to kill her and the police are forced to engage Cruz's men. Cruz himself is killed, but not before setting off a grenade. Syd is able to save Kyle, who is reunited with his mother. That night, Ray's nightclub is torched. His brother Dante contacts McKenna, warning her that Syd crossed a line. McKenna tells him never to call again and hangs up.
2	2	"Defiance"	Anton L. Cropper	John Dove & Pam Veasey	May 13, 2019
Syd and McKenna chase down a dangerous serial killer who is killing people while on social media sites. During the case, Syd's reckless actions result in the death of one of her father's CIs and send her colliding into McKenna's complicated past with Dante Sherman.
3	3	"Con Air"	Mark Tonderai	Brandon Margolis & Brandon Sonnier	May 13, 2019
As Syd and McKenna deal with the fallout of each other's actions, they look into the murder of a helicopter pilot that might be connected to a robbery crew. Meanwhile, the missing drugs Syd stole forces a new enforcer of Knox's to appear, getting Ray killed as a result and a break-in at her apartment restores some of Syd's memories.
4	4	"Déjà Vu"	Antonio Negret	Andrea Thornton Bolden	May 20, 2019
McKenna agrees to help Syd get the stolen Fentanyl into police custody without revealing their involvement. Syd and McKenna plan to sneak the drugs into a car shop where they know the LAPD is planning to raid. Calloway informs them that he will lead the raid. McKenna calls in a gas leak to postpone the raid while Syd sneaks in. The raid still happens and they discover the fentanyl. Calloway confronts McKenna and tells her that he suspects Syd was involved. Meanwhile, Izzy skips school to go to a prison and see Alice Kensler. She gets into the facility, but the guard identifies that she used a fake id and demands to see her real one. She is arrested and has to call for McKenna to pick her up from the jail.
5	5	"Farewell..."	Eagle Egilsson	J.L. Tiggett	May 20, 2019
While trying to solve the brutal murder of a transgender woman, McKenna tries to help Izzy with her grief over her mother's death, driving a wedge between her and her husband. Meanwhile, Syd faces her past when Hendrix forms a joint task force to take down Gabriel Knox.
6	6	"...My Lovely"	Janice Cooke	Diana Mendez	May 27, 2019
As the Bens continue to investigate the murder of a transgender woman and her boyfriend, Dante teams up with Syd and McKenna to attempt a risky plan to discover Arlo's real identity, who is threatening Syd's closest friends.
7	7	"Book of Secrets"	Anton L. Cropper	Brandon Margolis & Brandon Sonnier	May 27, 2019
The aftermath of Syd's meeting with Arlo in Santa Monica Pier leads to a surprising discovery for Syd. Nancy, Syd and the Bens are on the hunt for Arlo, while investigating an assault and homicide in life guard tower at the beach. A new associate of Knox named Carlene Hart is revealed to be a divorced single mother of two children, a boy and a girl. Dante finds Arlo before the others, making a decision that puts Nancy in a very hard position.
8	8	"Dead Men Tell No Tales"	Anton L. Cropper	John Dove	June 3, 2019
Nancy is forced to come clean about her past to Patrick, as he presses her on about it after some investigation. Meanwhile, the Bens look into a case of a group of robbers that managed to break into a vault and steal millions of untraceable diamonds, and a homicide linked to the robbery.
9	9	"Dangerous Minds"	Nathan Hope	Pam Veasey	June 3, 2019
Nancy, Syd and the Bens continue their investigation of the diamond robbery, which is linked to the cleaning company of a victim.
10	10	"Enemy of the State"	Anton L. Cropper	Carol Bass & Megan McNamara	June 10, 2019
The diamond investigation continues and leads them to a new discovery. Meanwhile, Nancy is cornered and forced to make a decision between her brother and her future.
11	11	"Thief"	Lexi Alexander	Marisa Tam	June 10, 2019
Warren Hendrix reveals to Syd that he was Gabriel Knox. In Miami the DEA had set him up undercover as a crime king-pin. When the DEA shut down the Miami operation, Carlene Hart moved it to L.A. and continued on her own, pretending that Knox was still in the background. Also, a plastic surgeon is murdered and the Bens works in the case.
12	12	"Armageddon"	Janice Cooke	John Dove & J.L. Tiggett	June 17, 2019
After discovering that Carlene Hart is the mastermind behind the Knox operations during meeting in Duval's home, Syd and Nancy have to move quickly to catch her before she disappears. Carlene also allows her former husband to transfer money from her account at a new secondary bank to an account overseas to care for her family, including her children. Carlene, however will not leave the country without her children. With the help of a DEA contact, Carlene is able to buy 48 hours to move her operation and plan her escape. The DEA and Internal Affairs take over the operation, suspending Syd, Nancy and the Bens. The four officers manage to gain the upper hand, leaving Carlene desperate. After getting their hands on Carlene's leverage on others, Syd uncovers the missing pieces of her time in Miami that leaves her devastated. Meanwhile, Izzy finally gets to sit down with Alice.
13	13	"Bad Girls"	Anton L. Cropper	Brandon Margolis & Brandon Sonnier	June 17, 2019
In retaliation to losing her leverage, Carlene abducts Izzy and Justice, McKenna's and Baines' kids. Carlene demands the return of her money in exchange for Izzy and Justice. After being arrested, custody of Carlene and her family is transferred from the LAPD to the U.S. Federal Authorities.

=== Season 2 (2020) ===
No. overall	No. in season	Title	Directed by	Written by	Original release date
14	1	"The Curse of the Black Pearl"	Anton L. Cropper	Brandon Margolis & Brandon Sonnier	September 9, 2020
15	2	"The Lone Ranger"	Anton L. Cropper	John Dove	September 9, 2020
16	3	"Thief of Hearts"	Lisa Campbell Demaine	Marisa Tam	September 9, 2020
17	4	"Beverly Hills Cops"	Solvan Naim	Aaron Carew	September 9, 2020
18	5	"Gone in 60 Seconds"	Ray Daniels	Michael Ballin & Thomas Aguilar	September 9, 2020
19	6	"Maverick"	Ruben Garcia	Megan McNamara	September 9, 2020
20	7	"March or Die"	Brandon Sonnier	Pam Veasey	September 9, 2020
21	8	"Bad Company"	Anton L. Cropper	John Dove	September 9, 2020
22	9	"Kangaroo Jack"	Anna Mastro	Carol Bass	September 9, 2020
23	10	"Deliver Us from Evil"	Anton L. Cropper	Aaron Carew & Marisa Tam	September 9, 2020
24	11	"Rafferty and the Gold Dust Twins"	Darren Grant	Barry L. Levy	September 9, 2020
25	12	"Coyote Ugly"	Erica Watson	Michael Ballin & Thomas Aguilar	September 9, 2020
26	13	"For Life" "Bad Girls for Life"	Antonio Negret	Brandon Margolis & Brandon Sonnier	September 9, 2020

== Production ==
=== Development ===
On October 25, 2017, it was reported that a television series spinoff of the Bad Boys films featuring the character Sydney "Syd" Burnett from Bad Boys II was in development. The pilot was set to be written by Brandon Margolis and Brandon Sonnier. Executive producers were expected to include Margolis, Sonnier, Jerry Bruckheimer, Jonathan Littman, KristieAnne Reed, Jeff Gaspin, and Jeff Morrone. Production companies involved with the series were set to include Sony Pictures Television, Jerry Bruckheimer Television, and 2.0 Entertainment.

On October 31, 2017, it was announced that NBC had given the production a pilot production commitment following a competitive situation where multiple networks had pursued the potential series. On January 18, 2018, it was announced that NBC had given the production an official drama pilot order. On February 2, 2018, it was reported that Anton Cropper would direct the pilot episode. On April 12, 2018, it was announced that the previously untitled pilot had been titled L.A.'s Finest. On May 11, 2018, it was reported that NBC had passed on the pilot and declined to pick up the production to series. The producers of the series were expected to shop the production to other networks.

On May 17, 2018, it was announced that Sony Pictures Television was in preliminary discussions with Charter Communications regarding a deal to pick up the series. By the end of the month, the talks had progressed to the point of serious negotiations. On June 26, 2018, it was announced that Charter Communications had given the production a series order for a first season consisting of thirteen episodes. On February 7, 2019, it was announced during the Television Critics Association's annual winter press tour that the series would premiere on May 13, 2019 with the release of the first three episodes. The remaining episodes were expected to be released on Mondays following the premiere via Spectrum's video on demand service accessible through their set-top cable boxes, along with the provider's iOS, Apple TV, and Roku applications. L.A.'s Finest is the first original television series produced by Spectrum.

The theme music for the series was composed by Laura Karpman.

On June 13, 2019, the series was renewed for a second season which was originally set to premiere on June 8, 2020, but on that date it was announced it had been pushed to "as-yet-[un]specified" date later in the year, in response to ongoing protests over police brutality. In August 2020, it was announced that the series would now premiere all thirteen episodes on September 9, 2020. On October 14, 2020, Spectrum canceled the series after two seasons.

=== Casting ===
Alongside the initial series development announcement, it was confirmed that Gabrielle Union would star in the series, reprising her role of Sydney "Syd" Burnett from the film Bad Boys II. On January 29, 2018, it was announced that Ernie Hudson had been cast in a series regular role. On February 15, 2018, it was reported that Zach Gilford and Duane Martin had joined the main cast. In March 2018, it was announced that Jessica Alba, Ryan McPartlin, and Zach McGowan had been cast as series regulars. In September 2018, it was reported that Sophie Reynolds had been cast in a series regular role and that Barry Sloane would appear in a recurring capacity. In October 2018, David Fumero and Jordan Rodrigues joined the series in recurring roles. On January 11, 2019, it was announced that Jake Busey had joined the cast in a recurring role.

=== Filming ===
Principal photography for the pilot began in early April 2018 in Los Angeles, California.

On February 21, 2019, executive producer and showrunner Brandon Sonnier was seriously injured during the shooting of a car stunt at the Port of Los Angeles when the vehicle accidentally crashed into the video village area of the set, which led to a partial amputation on his right leg. Brandon Margolis sustained minor injuries.

== Release ==
=== United States ===
On February 7, 2019, the official trailer for the series was released. The series premiered on Spectrum on May 13, 2019. L.A.'s Finest is the first premium content show made for the cable provider and the debut of its Spectrum Originals banner of exclusive programming. In June 2019, Spectrum Originals renewed the series for a second season, which premiered on September 9, 2020.

In May 2020, Fox acquired the broadcast rights for the series' first season to fill in primetime broadcast hours due to production suspensions during the COVID-19 pandemic and premiered on September 21, 2020.

In January 2021, the first season was added to Netflix. The second season was added on Amazon in July 2021. It also been made available on free streaming service Tubi.

=== International ===
The series was syndicated for airing in the United Kingdom by Fox. In Canada, the series aired on CTV in Fall 2019. Outside North America, the series has aired in France on TF1, in Southeast Asia on AXN Asia, in the UK on 5USA, in Germany on AXN Germany and in India on Zee Café. The show premiered in Australia on 10 Bold on November 7, 2019 before joining catch-up streaming service 10 Play. The second season premiered in early 2021 on 10 Bold in Australia. All 26 episodes are available on 10 Play.

== Reception ==
=== Critical response ===
On review aggregator Rotten Tomatoes, the series holds an approval rating of 24% based on 17 reviews, with an average rating of 4.56/10. The website's critical consensus reads, "A spin-off to nowhere, L.A.'s Finest operates on outdated sensibilities and wastes its talented leads' time—especially unfortunate considering Gabrielle Union's committed performance." On Metacritic, it has a weighted average score of 50 out of 100, based on 8 critics, indicating "mixed or average reviews". The series ranked 9th in TVLine's The 10 Worst Shows of 2019.

=== Accolades ===
Year	Award	Category	Nominee	Result	Ref.
2019	Teen Choice Awards	Choice Action TV Actress	Jessica Alba	Nominated	
2019	Teen Choice Awards	Choice Action TV Actress	Gabrielle Union	Won	
