= The Blueprint 2: The Gift & The Curse =

2002 studio album by Jay-Z

The Blueprint 2: The Gift & the Curse
- Two-disc edition cover

Studio album by Jay-Z
- Released: November 12, 2002
- Recorded: December 2001 – September 2002
- Studios: Baseline (New York); Record One (Los Angeles); Encore (Los Angeles); Master Sounds (Richmond, Virginia); Manhattan Center (New York); Boiler Room (Providence, Rhode Island); Sony Music (New York)
- Genre: Hip-hop
- Length: 108:24
- Labels: Roc-A-Fella; Island Def Jam
- Producers: Shawn Carter; Big Chuck; Charlemagne; Darrell "Digga" Branch; Dr. Dre; Ron Feemster; Heavy D; Just Blaze; Jimi Kendrix; the Neptunes; No I.D.; Timbaland; Kanye West

Jay-Z chronology
The Best of Both Worlds (2002)	The Blueprint 2: The Gift & the Curse (2002)	The Black Album (2003)

Alternative cover
- One-disc reissue edition cover

Singles from The Blueprint 2: The Gift & The Curse
- 1. "'03 Bonnie & Clyde" Released: October 10, 2002; 2. "Hovi Baby" Released: November 12, 2002; 3. "Excuse Me Miss" Released: February 4, 2003

Singles from Blueprint 2.1
- 1. "La-La-La (Excuse Me Miss Again)" Released: April 29, 2003

The Blueprint 2: The Gift & the Curse (stylized as The Blueprint²: The Gift & the Curse) is the seventh studio album by American rapper Jay-Z. It was released on November 12, 2002, by Roc-A-Fella Records and Island Def Jam Music Group. It is a double album, consisting of the pop rap-oriented The Gift and the hardcore hip-hop-focused The Curse. Like The Blueprint (2001), it was primarily produced by Just Blaze and Kanye West. Guest appearances include West, Faith Evans, the Notorious B.I.G, Dr. Dre, Rakim, Beyoncé, Sean Paul, Lenny Kravitz, Beanie Sigel, and Scarface, among others.

The Blueprint 2 debuted atop the Billboard 200 with first-week sales of 545,000 units, and received triple platinum certification by the Recording Industry Association of America (RIAA). It was supported by two singles that peaked within the top ten of the Billboard Hot 100: "'03 Bonnie & Clyde" (featuring Beyoncé) and "Excuse Me Miss". It received lukewarm reviews from music critics, who praised Jay-Z's performances, but found it inconsistent and criticized the length. In 2013, Jay-Z said he considers it one of his worst albums due to its overabundance of tracks. A one-disc reissue, Blueprint 2.1, was released in 2003.

== Background ==
The recording sessions took place after Jay-Z's critically acclaimed and commercially successful sixth album The Blueprint (2001). The production on the album was handled primarily by Just Blaze and Kanye West – both of whom had recently established themselves as two of hip-hop's most celebrated producers due to the success of The Blueprint – while other producers include The Neptunes, Timbaland, No I.D., Darrell "Digga" Branch, Charlemagne, Big Chuck, Dr. Dre, Jimmy Kendrick, Heavy D, and Neff-U.

Unlike The Blueprint which was almost void of guest appearances, The Blueprint² features many featured guests, even out-of-genre artists that include Lenny Kravitz and Sean Paul. Other features include West Coast rapper and producer Dr. Dre, Rakim, Beyoncé Knowles, Faith Evans, Beanie Sigel and Scarface. The album also includes an uncredited verse from Kanye West on the Timbaland-produced track "The Bounce". Pharrell also provides vocals and hooks of many of his produced tracks, for example "Excuse Me Miss" and "Nigga Please".

Though the album has no strict concept, the album contains two discs. The first disc titled "The Gift" features mainstream, pop-oriented music. The second disc titled "The Curse" contains dark, emotional, and bravado street songs such as the dark-toned retelling of "Meet the Parents", the emotional substance of escaping the dangerous ghetto in "Some How Some Way", the dissing of Nas and Jaz-O in "Blueprint^{2}", and the bravado "Nigga Please".

== Critical reception ==
Professional ratings
Aggregate scores
Source	Rating
Metacritic	64/100
Review scores
Source	Rating
AllMusic	3/5 stars
Blender	4/5 stars
Christgau's Consumer Guide	(1-star Honorable Mention)
Entertainment Weekly	C
NME	4/5 stars
Pitchfork	7.5/10
Q	4/5 stars
Rolling Stone	3/5 stars
Spin	9/10
Uncut	2/5 stars

Professional ratings
Review scores
Source	Rating
AllMusic	3.5/5 stars
RapReviews	8.5/10
Rolling Stone	2/5 stars

The Blueprint 2 received lukewarm reviews from critics. According to the review aggregator Metacritic, The Blueprint 2: The Gift & The Curse received "generally favorable reviews" based on a weighted average score of 64 out of 100 from 19 critic scores. According to Nathan Rabin, the record "led many to claim that [Jay-Z] lost his vise-like grip on rap music". In his review for The A.V. Club, Rabin deemed it "overreaching but surprisingly solid", featuring a first disc of clever pop-rap jams and a second that was "darker and more erratic". Rolling Stone critic Christian Hoard said The Blueprint 2 was another "strong record from hip-hop's most dependable voice" but felt Jay-Z's flow was more impressive than the production, finding it "long on both bouncy funk and forgettable R&B samples". AllMusic's John Bush believed Jay-Z showcased some exceptional songs but could not carry the 110-minute double album as consistently as its predecessor. Soren Baker was more critical in the Chicago Tribune. He felt Jay-Z's reworking of other rappers' music ("A Dream", "'03 Bonnie & Clyde", and "The Watcher 2") was unimaginative while the rest of the album lacked his usual enthusiasm. "It reminds me of nearly every other double CD", David Browne wrote in Entertainment Weekly. "It could have been a good single disc." Robert Christgau named "U Don't Know (Remix)" and "Poppin' Tags" as highlights while writing in his Village Voice consumer guide that he was disappointed Jay-Z sampled Paul Anka for "I Did It My Way" when he could not get permission to use Frank Sinatra's recording of "My Way".

Rollie Pemberton was more enthusiastic in his review for Pitchfork, writing that Jay-Z "weaves his way through every imaginable style and flavor with unyielding expertise". Billboard hailed it as "the most ambitious and most fully realized album of his career", while Q felt it surpassed his previous album. In the opinion of Spin critic Chris Ryan, The Blueprint 2 found Jay-Z "tightening the screws of his delivery" and discovering a "bruising poetry in a flow that once seemed clumsily conversational".

About the reception, Jay-Z said: "That wasn't my fault. I ain't taking that one. I didn't want to make a double album. I was making so much music, the guys around me were like, 'Yo, make a double album.' And that's me being diplomatic about it. It's not a dictatorship around me and my friends. If everybody is saying it, then let's do it. I'll roll with that. That was the case. If you do the backstory with Guru and Hip-Hop, my whole trustee…But at the same time, Hip-Hop gave me the title for 'Big Pimpin'.' Of course, it sold 4 million albums so I guess…Everyone would love to fail like that. It failed to me because I want the hearts.

=== Impact of "The Bounce" ===
West's verse on the track "The Bounce" marked his first appearance as a rapper on a Roc-A-Fella release (although he contributed an uncredited hook to The Blueprint's "Never Change" the previous year aside from handling the production).

Vocals from Audio Two's 1987 single "Top Billin'" are sampled throughout the song. As well as this, it samples vocals from Alka Yagnik and Ila Arun's 1993 song "Choli Ke Peeche Kya Hai" throughout. Pitchfork described "The Bounce" as Jay-Z showing 'extreme assonance'. In 2003, the track peaked at number 12 on the US Billboard Bubbling Under R&B/Hip-Hop Singles chart and remained on it for a total of seven weeks.

== Reissue ==
The album was reissued as Blueprint 2.1 on April 8, 2003 as a re-cut version of The Blueprint 2: The Gift & The Curse. It contains half the tracks of the original, alongside two hidden tracks (after "What They Gonna Do, Pt. II") not included in The Blueprint 2: The Gift & The Curse. The track "La-La-La (Excuse Me Miss Again)", which also was released as a single, can also be found on the soundtrack to the 2003 film Bad Boys II and the new cut track "Stop". Although "La-La-La" did not chart the Billboard Hot 100, it did chart on the Hot R&B/Hip-Hop Songs chart (at 37), the Hot Rap Songs chart (at 20), and the Bubbling Under Hot 100 Singles chart (at 12), all in the United States of America. "Stop" also charted on the US Hot R&B/Hip-Hops Songs chart (at 53). The Jay-Z remix of Punjabi MC's "Beware of the Boys" is included as an additional hidden track on the European version only and is lifted off Punjabi MC's album/CDS. The bonus tracks are unlisted and do not have track numbers. The album was certified gold by the RIAA.

== Track listing ==
=== Two-disc edition ===
Disc one: The Gift
No.	Title	Writer(s)	Producer(s)	Length
1.	"A Dream" (featuring Faith Evans and The Notorious B.I.G.)	Shawn Carter; Kanye West; Christopher Wallace; Sean Combs; Jean-Claude Olivier; James Forman	Kanye West	4:12
2.	"Hovi Baby"	Carter; Justin Smith; Kenneth Edmonds	Just Blaze	4:21
3.	"The Watcher 2" (featuring Dr. Dre, Rakim and Truth Hurts)	Carter; Andre Young; William Griffin, Jr.; Scott Storch	Dr. Dre	5:55
4.	"'03 Bonnie & Clyde" (featuring Beyoncé Knowles)	Carter; West; Prince Nelson; Darryl Harper; Ricky Rouse; Tupac Shakur; Tyrone Wrice	Kanye West	3:25
5.	"Excuse Me Miss"	Carter; Pharrell Williams; Charles Hugo	The Neptunes	4:41
6.	"What They Gonna Do" (featuring Sean Paul)	Carter; Timothy Mosley	Timbaland	4:54
7.	"All Around the World" (featuring LaToiya Williams)	Carter; Ernest Wilson; Bruce Hawes; Joseph Jefferson; Charles Simmons; George Clinton; William Collins; Walter Morrison; Jim Vitti; Edwin Hawkins	No I.D.	3:52
8.	"Poppin' Tags" (featuring Big Boi, Killer Mike and Twista)	Carter; West; Antwan Patton; Michael Render; Carl Mitchell; William Robinson, Jr.	Kanye West	6:00
9.	"Fuck All Nite"	Carter; Williams; Hugo	The Neptunes	4:19
10.	"The Bounce" (featuring Kanye West)	Carter; Mosley; West	Timbaland, Kanye West	4:18
11.	"I Did It My Way"	Carter; Jimi Kendrix; Chuck Stanton; Paul Anka; Claude François; Jacques Revaud; Gilles Thibaut	Jay-Z; Big Chuck	3:42
Total length:				49:47

Disc two: The Curse
No.	Title	Writer(s)	Producer(s)	Length
1.	"Diamond Is Forever"	Carter; Theron Feemster; Stanton	Ron Feemster; Big Chuck	3:56
2.	"Guns & Roses" (featuring Lenny Kravitz)	Carter; Dwight Myers; John McCrea	Heavy D	4:26
3.	"U Don't Know (Remix)" (featuring M.O.P.)	Carter; Smith; Eric Murray; Jamal Grinnage; Bobby Byrd	Just Blaze	4:27
4.	"Meet the Parents"	Carter; Smith	Just Blaze	4:59
5.	"Some How Some Way" (featuring Beanie Sigel and Scarface)	Carter; Smith; Dwight Grant; Brad Jordan; Michael McGloiry	Just Blaze	5:37
6.	"Some People Hate"	Carter; West; Brenda Russell; Brian Russell	Kanye West	4:32
7.	"Blueprint 2"	Carter; Henri Charlemagne; Ennio Morricone	Charlemagne	4:49
8.	"Nigga Please" (featuring Young Chris)	Carter; Williams; Hugo; Christopher Ries	The Neptunes	4:38
9.	"2 Many Hoes"	Carter; Mosley	Timbaland	3:34
10.	"As One" (featuring Memphis Bleek, Beanie Sigel, Freeway, Young Gunz, Peedi Crakk, Sparks and Rell)	Carter; Smith; Malik Cox; Grant; Leslie Pridgen; Pedro Zayas; Ries; Hanif Muhammad; Kenneth Johnson; Maurice White; Verdine White; Eduardo Del Barrio	Just Blaze	3:49
11.	"A Ballad for the Fallen Soldier" (featuring Marc Dorsey and Pharrell Williams)	Carter; Williams; Hugo	The Neptunes	4:42
12.	"Show You How" (bonus track)	Carter; Smith	Just Blaze	2:59
13.	"Bitches & Sisters" (bonus track)	Carter; Smith; Isaac Hayes, Jr.; David Porter	Just Blaze	2:39
14.	"What They Gonna Do, Part II" (bonus track)	Carter; Darrell Branch	Darrell "Digga" Branch	3:47
Total length:				58:53

=== One-disc reissue edition ===
Blueprint 2.1 track listing
No.	Title	Length
1.	"A Dream" (featuring Faith Evans and the Notorious B.I.G.)	3:46
2.	"Hovi Baby"	4:21
3.	"The Watcher 2" (featuring Dr. Dre, Rakim and Truth Hurts)	5:54
4.	"'03 Bonnie & Clyde" (featuring Beyoncé Knowles)	3:24
5.	"Excuse Me Miss"	4:40
6.	"All Around the World" (featuring LaToiya Williams)	3:52
7.	"Guns & Roses" (featuring Lenny Kravitz)	4:25
8.	"U Don't Know (Remix)" (featuring M.O.P.)	4:27
9.	"Meet the Parents"	4:58
10.	"Some How Some Way" (featuring Beanie Sigel and Scarface)	5:36
11.	"The Bounce" (featuring Kanye West)	4:17
12.	"What They Gonna Do, Part II"	3:47
13.	"La-La-La (Excuse Me Miss Again)" (hidden track) (written by Carter, Williams, and Hugo; produced by The Neptunes)	4:42
14.	"Stop" (hidden track) (produced by Swizz Beatz)	2:53
15.	"Beware of the Boys (Jay-Z Remix)" (hidden track) (produced by Punjabi MC)	3:59
Total length:		60:05

=== Note ===
- "Blueprint 2" is stylized as "Blueprint^{2}".

== Charts ==
=== Weekly charts ===
Chart performance for The Blueprint 2: The Gift & The Curse
Chart (2002)	Peak position
Canadian Albums (Billboard)	8
Dutch Albums (Album Top 100)	66
French Albums (SNEP)	79
German Albums (Offizielle Top 100)	61
New Zealand Albums (RMNZ)	49
Scottish Albums (Official Charts)	37
Swiss Albums (Schweizer Hitparade)	52
UK Albums (Official Charts)	23
UK R&B Albums (Official Charts)	4
US Billboard 200	1
US Top R&B/Hip-Hop Albums (Billboard)	1

=== Year-end charts ===
Year-end chart performance for The Blueprint 2: The Gift & The Curse
Chart (2002)	Position
Canadian Albums (Nielsen SoundScan)	130
Canadian R&B Albums (Nielsen SoundScan)	24
Canadian Rap Albums (Nielsen SoundScan)	11
US Billboard 200	137
US Top R&B/Hip-Hop Albums (Billboard)	45

Chart (2003)	Position
US Billboard 200	50
US Top R&B/Hip-Hop Albums (Billboard)	11

== Certifications ==
Region	Certification	Certified units/sales
Canada (Music Canada)	2× Platinum	200,000^{^}
United Kingdom (BPI)	Gold	100,000^{^}
United States (RIAA)	3× Platinum	3,000,000^{^}
^{^} Shipments figures based on certification alone.

== See also ==
- List of number-one albums of 2002 (U.S.)
- List of number-one R&B albums of 2002 (U.S.)
