= Bad Boys II (soundtrack) =

Bad Boys II: The Soundtrack

Soundtrack album by various artists
- Released: July 15, 2003
- Recorded: 2002–2003
- Genres: Hip hop; R&B
- Length: 59:10
- Labels: Bad Boy; Universal
- Producers: Bob Badami (exec.); Jerry Bruckheimer (exec.); Kathy Nelson (exec.); Michael Bay (exec.); P. Diddy (also exec.); Harve Pierre; Mario Winans; Ryan Leslie; The Neptunes; Younglord; Cool & Dre; Jayson "Koko" Bridges; Just Blaze; Lenny Kravitz; M.O.P.; Nelly; Red Spyda; Stevie J; The Natural; Tony Dofat

Bad Boys soundtrack chronology
Bad Boys (Music from the Motion Picture) (1995)	Bad Boys II: The Soundtrack (2003)	Bad Boys for Life – The Soundtrack (2020)

Bad Boy Records chronology
We Invented the Remix (2002)	Bad Boys II: The Soundtrack (2003)	Bad Boy's 10th Anniversary... The Hits (2004)

Singles from Bad Boys II: The Soundtrack
- 1. "Flipside" Released: February 25, 2003; 2. "La-La-La" Released: April 29, 2003; 3. "Shake Ya Tailfeather" Released: June 29, 2003; 4. "Show Me Your Soul" Released: December 15, 2003

Bad Boys II: The Soundtrack is the soundtrack to Michael Bay's 2003 action-comedy film Bad Boys II. It was released on July 15, 2003 through Bad Boy Records and Universal Records. The album peaked at number one on the Billboard 200, selling 324,000 units in the first week, becoming one of few soundtracks to reach the position. On August 21, 2003, the Recording Industry Association of America certified the album platinum with over one million units shipped.

The first single, Jay-Z's "La-La-La", is the sequel of "Excuse Me Miss" from his album The Blueprint 2: The Gift & The Curse. The second single, "Shake Ya Tailfeather", by Nelly, P. Diddy and Murphy Lee, reached number one on the Billboard Hot 100 and it won Grammy Award for Best Rap Performance by a Duo or Group at the 46th Annual Grammy Awards.

== Background ==
The soundtrack became the first album to be released under the Bad Boy Records and Universal Records partnership. As the album's executive producer, P. Diddy stated:

The 'Bad Boys II' [soundtrack] means a lot to us 'cause it's the second era of Bad Boy... When I heard they were doing Bad Boys II,' I had to pick up the phone and call Will Smith and [the movie's producer] Jerry Bruckheimer. I was like, 'I'm about to launch my label and I've never done a soundtrack. I think this would be the perfect thing.'

P. Diddy shared his views on the album, saying "it's not just one of those soundtracks where it's just a compilation record and it's not cohesive... These are all new songs. I've done a lot of work [and] I've produced almost everybody that's on the soundtrack, or I've paired on a record with them before. I'm in constant contact with them. I think that everyone respected the fact that I wanted to do something that was special".

== Critical reception ==
Professional ratings
Review scores
Source	Rating
AllMusic	4.5/5 stars
Blender	3/5 stars
Entertainment Weekly	B−
IGN	6.5/10
RapReviews	7/10
Rolling Stone	3/5 stars

The album received generally positive reviews from music critics. Rob Theakston of AllMusic noted that it is rare for a hip hop movie soundtrack to "be explosive and feel as if it's a solid cohesive album, rather than a showcase for various artists to use throwaway tracks". Rolling Stone concurred, saying "this is how to do a hip-hop soundtrack". Blender magazine observed that the record is "riddled with stars", "packed with production pyrotechnics", and called the album "pure Hollywood".

== Track listing ==
No.	Title	Writer(s)	Producer(s)	Length
1.	"Intro" (performed by Martin Lawrence and Will Smith)		Harve Pierre	0:12
2.	"Show Me Your Soul" (performed by P. Diddy, Lenny Kravitz, Pharrell Williams and Loon)	Pharrell Williams; Lenny Kravitz; Sean Combs; Chauncey Hawkins; Varick Smith	The Neptunes; Sean "P. Diddy" Combs; Lenny Kravitz	5:20
3.	"La-La-La" (performed by Jay-Z)	Shawn Carter; Williams	The Neptunes	3:54
4.	"Shake Ya Tailfeather" (performed by Nelly, P. Diddy and Murphy Lee)	Cornell Haynes; Smith; Murphy Lee; Jayson Bridges	Nelly; Jayson "Koko" Bridges	4:53
5.	"Girl I'm a Bad Boy" (performed by Fat Joe and P. Diddy featuring Dre)	Joseph Cartagena; Andre Lyon; Marcello Valenzano; Smith	Cool & Dre	3:22
6.	"Keep Giving Your Love to Me" (performed by Beyoncé)	Ryan Leslie; Richard Frierson; Beyoncé Knowles; Adonis Shropshire	Sean "P. Diddy" Combs; Ryan Leslie; Younglord	3:08
7.	"Realest Niggas" (performed by Notorious B.I.G. and 50 Cent)	Christopher Wallace; Curtis Jackson; Andy Thelusma; Tony Dofat	Red Spyda; DJ Whoo Kid (co.)	3:29
8.	"Flipside" (performed by Freeway and Peedi Crakk)	Leslie Pridgen; Justin Smith; Pedro Zayas	Just Blaze	3:55
9.	"Gangsta Shit" (performed by Snoop Dogg with Loon)	Steven Jordan; Calvin Broadus; Hawkins	Stevie J; Sean "P. Diddy" Combs	4:31
10.	"Pretty Girl Bullshit" (performed by Mario Winans featuring Foxy Brown)	Mario Winans; Inga Marchand	Mario "Yellowman" Winans	4:22
11.	"Model (Interlude)" (performed by Martin Lawrence)		Harve Pierre	0:04
12.	"Love Don't Love Me" (performed by Justin Timberlake)	Justin Timberlake; Winans; Combs; Anthony Nance; Antonio Dixon; Brion James	Sean "P. Diddy" Combs; Mario "Yellowman" Winans	4:21
13.	"Relax Your Mind" (performed by Loon)	Hawkins; Frierson; Leslie; August Moon; Tyrone Thomas; Erick Sermon; Parrish Smith	Younglord; Ryan Leslie	4:15
14.	"Didn't Mean" (performed by Mary J. Blige)	Mary J. Blige; Combs; Dimitri Christo; Dong-hwa Chung; Bebel Gilberto; Kamaal Fareed; Ali Shaheed Muhammad; Malik Taylor; James Yancey	Sean "P. Diddy" Combs; The Natural	3:44
15.	"God Sent You (Interlude)" (performed by Martin Lawrence and Will Smith)		Harve Pierre	0:15
16.	"Why" (performed by Da Band)	Dofat; Rodney Hill; Freddrick Watson; Lloyd Mathis	Tony Dofat	4:38
17.	"Shot You (Interlude)" (performed by Martin Lawrence and Will Smith)		Harve Pierre	0:06
18.	"Wanna Be G's" (performed by M.O.P. featuring Sheritha Lynch)	Eric Murray; Jamal Grinnage	M.O.P.	4:28
Total length:				59:10

== Charts ==
=== Weekly charts ===
Chart (2003)	Peak position
Australian Albums (ARIA)	14
Austrian Albums (Ö3 Austria)	26
Canadian Albums (Billboard)	1
Dutch Albums (Album Top 100)	82
French Albums (SNEP)	42
German Albums (Offizielle Top 100)	46
New Zealand Albums (RMNZ)	3
Swiss Albums (Schweizer Hitparade)	8
US Billboard 200	1
US Top R&B/Hip-Hop Albums (Billboard)	1
US Soundtrack Albums (Billboard)	1

=== Year-end charts ===
Chart (2003)	Position
Australian Albums (ARIA)	99
New Zealand Albums (RMNZ)	48
Swiss Albums (Schweizer Hitparade)	63
US Billboard 200	42
US Top R&B/Hip-Hop Albums (Billboard)	25
US Soundtrack Albums (Billboard)	3

== Certifications ==
Region	Certification	Certified units/sales
Australia (ARIA)	Gold	35,000^{^}
Canada (Music Canada)	Platinum	100,000^{^}
New Zealand (RMNZ)	Gold	7,500^{^}
United Kingdom (BPI)	Silver	60,000^{*}
United States (RIAA)	Platinum	1,000,000^{^}
^{*} Sales figures based on certification alone.^{^} Shipments figures based on certification alone.

== Credits ==
Information taken from AllMusic:

- Producers: Sean Combs, Jayson "Koko" Bridges, Cool & Dre, DJ Whoo Kid, Tony Dofat, Just Blaze, Lenny Kravitz, Ryan Leslie, M.O.P., The Natural a.k.a. D-Nat, Nelly, The Neptunes, Red Spyda, Younglord, Joe Hooker
- Executive producers: Jerry Bruckheimer, Sean Combs, Kathy Nelson
- Engineers: Wayne Allison, Robert "Big Brizz" Bane, Andrew Coleman, Stephen Dent, Emery Dobyns, Tony Dofat, Shon Don, Jason "Jay E" Epperson, Chip Karpells, Gimel Keaton, Tony Maserati, Lynn Montrose, Red Spyda, Rocklogic, Sha Money XL, Frank Socorro, Carlisle Young
- Assistant engineers: Alexis Seton
- Assistants: Lynn Montrose, Alexis Seton
- Mixing: Diddy, Ken Duro Ifill, Gimel Keaton, Rich Keller, Paul Logus, Mike Patterson, Rob Paustian, Red Spyda
- Mastering: Chris Athens
- A&R: Conrad Diamanche, Damon Eden, Henry Joseph Pierre, Slam
- Programming: Tony Dofat, Mario Winans, Bill Danze (drums and keyboard),
- Creative director: Christopher Stern
- Bass: Eddie Monteiya
- Guitar: David Cabrera
- Vocals: Henry Joseph Pierre (vocal producer), LaToiya Williams, Jack Knight , Pharrell Williams
- Music supervisor: Bob Badami, Kathy Nelson
- Soundtrack supervisor: Francesca Spero
- Production coordination: Gwendolyn Niles
