= Show Me Your Soul (2003 song) =

Single by P. Diddy, Lenny Kravitz, Pharrell Williams and Loon

from the album Bad Boys II: The Soundtrack
- Released: December 15, 2003
- Genre: Hip-hop
- Length: 5:20
- Label: Bad Boy; Universal
- Songwriters: Sean Combs; Leonard Kravitz; Pharrell Williams; Chauncey Hawkins
- Producers: Lenny Kravitz; The Neptunes

P. Diddy singles chronology
"Summertime" (2003)	"Show Me Your Soul" (2003)	"I Don't Wanna Know" (2004)

Lenny Kravitz singles chronology
"Yesterday Is Gone (My Dear Kay)" (2002)	"Show Me Your Soul" (2003)	"Where Are We Runnin'?" (2004)

Pharrell Williams singles chronology
"Change Clothes" (2003)	"Show Me Your Soul" (2003)	"Drop It Like It's Hot" (2004)

Loon singles chronology
"How You Want That" (2003)	"Show Me Your Soul" (2003)	"Who Is Dat" (2007)

Music video
- Diddy [feat. Lenny Kravitz] - Show Me Your Soul (Official Music Video) on YouTube

"Show Me Your Soul" is a song by P. Diddy, Lenny Kravitz, Pharrell Williams, and Loon. The song was released by Bad Boy and Universal as the fourth single from the soundtrack album for the 2003 film Bad Boys II, an action comedy movie directed by Michael Bay, produced by Jerry Bruckheimer, and starring Martin Lawrence and Will Smith. All instrumental parts were performed by Lenny Kravitz and Pharrell Williams. The song was aired on Soul Train on November 15, 2003. Chris Robinson directed the music video. The song "Dirrty" by Christina Aguilera was referenced in the lyrics.

== Reception ==
Tom Sinclair of Entertainment Weekly wrote, "”Show Me Your Soul,” a propulsive mash-up that features the unlikely alliance of Diddy, Lenny Kravitz, the Neptunes’ Pharrell Williams, and a new rapper named Loon. It’s got that easily identifiable, winning Neptunes vibe and is filled with loopy pronouncements like ”It’s gettin’ sexy in here." A reviewer from IGN added, "It's typical Bad Boy flair, you know a simple, yet catchy as hell loop and groove created by Pharrell Williams and Lenny Kravitz over which the Didd lets loose with his languid flow, talking about his label, flossing, and his continued mourning of Biggie. Bad Boy newcomer Loon also drops on the track with an equally lax delivery augmented by a nice nasal twinge. Inescapably infectious."

== Track listing ==
All tracks are written by Pharrell Williams, Lenny Kravitz, Sean Combs, Chauncey Hawkins, Varick Smith.

No.	Title	Length
1.	"Show Me Your Soul"	5:20

== Charts ==
Chart (2003)	Peak position
Australia (ARIA)	45
Australian Urban (ARIA)	17
Belgium (Ultratip Bubbling Under Flanders)	1
Germany (GfK)	61
Ireland (IRMA)	49
Scotland Singles (OCC)	42
Switzerland (Schweizer Hitparade)	62
UK Singles (OCC)	35
UK Hip Hop/R&B (OCC)	8
