= Live in Brooklyn (EP) =

EP by Jay-Z
- Released: October 9, 2012
- Recorded: October 6, 2012
- Genre: Hip-hop
- Labels: Roc Nation, Atlantic Records

Jay-Z chronology
Watch the Throne (2011)	Live in Brooklyn (2012)	Magna Carta Holy Grail (2013)

Live in Brooklyn is an extended play by American rapper Jay-Z. It was released on October 9, 2012 through record labels Roc Nation and Atlantic Records. The EP was released as digital download, and was available to pre-order on October 7, 2012 via the iTunes Store.

== Background ==
The extended play was filmed and recorded at Barclays Center in Brooklyn, New York on October 6, 2012, where Jay-Z brought his wife Beyoncé on the stage. Both performed songs such as "Diva", "Crazy in Love" together, and closed the performance with Jay-Z's single "Young Forever". It was his eighth and last sold-out concert at Barclays Center.

== Track listing ==
No.	Title	Producer(s)	Length
1.	"Empire State of Mind (Live)"	Al Shux	4:32
2.	"Run This Town (Live)"	Kanye West, No I.D.	3:15
3.	"On to the Next One (Live)"	Swizz Beatz	3:31
4.	"Give It To Me/Big Pimpin' (Live)"	The Neptunes/Timbaland	4:07
5.	"'03 Bonnie & Clyde (Live)"	Kanye West	1:18
6.	"Crazy in Love [Live]" (Beyoncé featuring Jay-Z)	Rich Harrison, Beyoncé Knowles	3:06
7.	"Public Service Announcement (Live)"	Just Blaze	2:32
8.	"Young Forever (Live)" (featuring Beyoncé)	Kanye West	5:50
9.	"Empire State of Mind" (video)	Al Shux
10.	"Run This Town" (video)	Kanye West, No I.D.
11.	"On to the Next One" (video)	Swizz Beatz
12.	"Give It To Me/Big Pimpin" (video)	The Neptunes/Timbaland
13.	"03' Bonnie & Clyde" (video)	Kanye West
14.	"Crazy in Love" (Beyoncé featuring Jay-Z; video)	Rich Harrison, Beyoncé Knowles
15.	"Public Service Announcement" (video)	Just Blaze
16.	"Young Forever" (featuring Beyoncé; video)	Kanye West

== Release history ==
Region	Date	Format(s)	Label
United States	October 9, 2012	digital download	Roc Nation, Atlantic Records

Produced by Scott Mirkin
