= List of Billboard 200 number-one albums of 2002 =

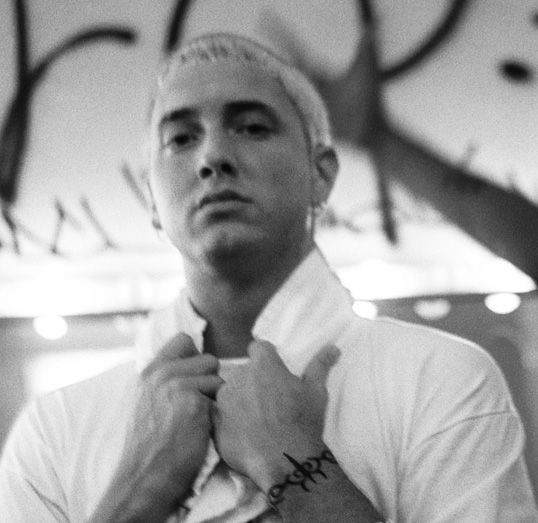
Eminem's The Eminem Show was the best-selling album of 2002.

The highest-selling albums and EPs in the United States are ranked in the Billboard 200, published by Billboard magazine. The data are compiled by Nielsen Soundscan based on each album's weekly physical and digital sales.

25 acts achieved number one albums during this year with artist such as Nelly and Shania Twain who had their albums debut at number one on the chart. Rapper Eminem's The Eminem Show is the best selling album of 2002 selling over approximately 7.6 million copies by the end of the year. It is also the longest running album of 2002 spending six non-consecutive weeks the chart and was known for its first full week of sales debut of 1,321,799 copies which Nielsen SoundScan scanned as the then sixth largest sales of all time in its first full week.

The band Creed continued its eight week long run on the chart but is credited as the longest running album for 2001. Jennifer Lopez earned her second number one album on the charts with J to tha L-O!: The Remixes, which became the highest first week sales of a remix album at the time. R&B artist Ashanti earned her first number one album with her self-titled debut album Ashanti, which opened up with first week sales of about 503,000 copies in its first week alone. Puff Daddy earned his first number one album since No Way Out back in 1997. Rapper Jay-Z earned his fifth chart topper with The Blueprint 2: The Gift & The Curse, which opened up with first week sales of about 545,000 copies alone. Heavy metal band Disturbed earned its first number one album on the chart with Believe, which opened up with first week sales of about 284,000 copies alone.

Country music singer Shania Twain's album Up! opened up with a huge first week sales of about 857,000 copies in its first week alone, giving her the recognition of the highest first week sales of her career and the second highest sales week of the year, only behind Eminem's The Eminem Show and at the time the fastest selling solo female album ever. Nelly's album Nellyville opened up with his highest first week sales of his career which logged on with huge sales of about 714,000 copies in its first week alone, which beat his sales of his debut album Country Grammar, which opened up with first week sales of about 235,000 copies. Country singer Alan Jackson album Drive gave him his first number one album on the chart and opened up with first week sales of about 211,000 copies.

== Chart history ==
Key
| † | Indicates best performing album of 2002 |

| Issue date | Album | Artist(s) | Sales | Ref. |
|---|---|---|---|---|
| January 5 | Weathered | Creed | 860,000 | |
| January 12 | Weathered | Creed | 398,000 | |
| January 19 | Weathered | Creed | 166,000 | |
| January 26 | Weathered | Creed | 138,000 | |
| February 2 | Drive | Alan Jackson | 423,000 | |
| February 9 | Drive | Alan Jackson | 230,014 | |
| February 16 | Drive | Alan Jackson | 188,733 | |
| February 23 | J to tha L-O!: The Remixes | Jennifer Lopez | 156,049 | |
| March 2 | Drive | Alan Jackson | 184,000 | |
| March 9 | J to tha L-O!: The Remixes | Jennifer Lopez | 102,000 | |
| March 16 | Under Rug Swept | Alanis Morissette | 215,000 | |
| March 23 | O Brother, Where Art Thou? | Soundtrack | 159,000 | |
| March 30 | O Brother, Where Art Thou? | Soundtrack | 148,855 | |
| April 6 | Now 9 | Various Artists | 420,000 | |
| April 13 | A New Day Has Come | Celine Dion | 558,000 | |
| April 20 | Ashanti | Ashanti | 503,000 | |
| April 27 | Ashanti | Ashanti | 246,000 | |
| May 4 | Ashanti | Ashanti | 190,000 | |
| May 11 | No Shoes, No Shirt, No Problems | Kenny Chesney | 235,000 | |
| May 18 | Hood Rich | Big Tymers | 160,000 | |
| May 25 | Juslisen | Musiq Soulchild | 260,000 | |
| June 1 | We Invented the Remix | P. Diddy and The Bad Boy Family | 256,000 | |
| June 8 | The Eminem Show † | Eminem | 284,534 | |
| June 15 | The Eminem Show † | Eminem | 1,321,799 | |
| June 22 | The Eminem Show † | Eminem | 808,708 | |
| June 29 | The Eminem Show † | Eminem | 529,562 | |
| July 6 | The Eminem Show † | Eminem | 380,764 | |
| July 13 | Nellyville | Nelly | 715,000 | |
| July 20 | Nellyville | Nelly | 450,000 | |
| July 27 | Nellyville | Nelly | 340,000 | |
| August 3 | Busted Stuff | Dave Matthews Band | 622,000 | |
| August 10 | Unleashed | Toby Keith | 338,000 | |
| August 17 | The Rising | Bruce Springsteen | 525,000 | |
| August 24 | The Rising | Bruce Springsteen | 239,000 | |
| August 31 | Nellyville | Nelly | 183,000 | |
| September 7 | The Eminem Show † | Eminem | 172,253 | |
| September 14 | Home | Dixie Chicks | 780,000 | |
| September 21 | Home | Dixie Chicks | 367,000 | |
| September 28 | Home | Dixie Chicks | 214,000 | |
| October 5 | Believe | Disturbed | 284,000 | |
| October 12 | ELV1S: 30#1 Hits | Elvis Presley | 500,000 | |
| October 19 | ELV1S: 30#1 Hits | Elvis Presley | 337,000 | |
| October 26 | ELV1S: 30#1 Hits | Elvis Presley | 205,000 | |
| November 2 | Cry | Faith Hill | 472,000 | |
| November 9 | Shaman | Santana | 299,000 | |
| November 16 | 8 Mile | Soundtrack | 702,000 | |
| November 23 | 8 Mile | Soundtrack | 508,000 | |
| November 30 | The Blueprint²: The Gift & the Curse | Jay-Z | 545,000 | |
| December 7 | Up! | Shania Twain | 874,000 | |
| December 14 | Up! | Shania Twain | 623,000 | |
| December 21 | Up! | Shania Twain | 317,000 | |
| December 28 | Up! | Shania Twain | 373,000 | |

== See also ==
- 2002 in music
