= Hovi Baby =

Single by Jay-Z

from the album The Blueprint 2: The Gift & the Curse
- Released: November 12, 2002
- Recorded: April 2002
- Genre: Hip hop
- Length: 4:21
- Label: Roc-A-Fella; Def Jam
- Songwriters: S. Carter; J. Smith; K. Edmonds
- Producer: Just Blaze

Jay-Z singles chronology
"'03 Bonnie & Clyde" (2002)	"Hovi Baby" (2002)	"Excuse Me Miss" (2003)

"Hovi Baby" is a song by Jay-Z from his album The Blueprint 2: The Gift & The Curse. It was released on November 12, 2002. It was released as the second single from the album. The song is produced by Just Blaze and contains a sample of the live version of "Diggin' on You" by TLC. It peaked at number 76 on the Hot R&B/Hip-Hop Songs chart.

The song is mainly Jay-Z boasting of his success in rap. At one point he hints that only 2Pac and the Notorious B.I.G. might be considered as good:

Ain't no livin person can test him
Only two restin' in heaven
Can be mentioned in the same breath as him

No music video was made for "Hovi Baby", but the song was used in a Reebok ad, with the lyrics slightly altered.

The B-side of the single features a track also produced by Just Blaze, "U Don't Know (Remix)", featuring M.O.P.

== Formats and track listings ==
=== A-Side ===
1. Hovi Baby (Radio)
2. Hovi Baby (LP Version)
3. Hovi Baby (Instrumental)

=== B-Side ===
1. U Don't Know (Remix) feat. M.O.P. (Radio)
2. U Don't Know (remix) feat. M.O.P. (LP Version)
3. U Don't Know (remix) feat. M.O.P. (Instrumental)

== See also ==
- List of songs recorded by Jay-Z
