= '03 Bonnie & Clyde =

2002 single by Jay-Z featuring Beyoncé Knowles

Single by Jay-Z featuring Beyoncé Knowles

from the album The Blueprint 2: The Gift & The Curse
- Released: October 10, 2002
- Recorded: August 2002
- Studio: Baseline Studios (New York, NY)
- Genre: Hip hop; R&B
- Length: 3:25
- Label: Roc-A-Fella; Def Jam
- Songwriters: Shawn Carter; Kanye West; Prince; Tupac Shakur; Darryl Harper; Ricky Rouse; Tyrone Wrice
- Producer: Kanye West

Jay-Z singles chronology
| "What We Do" (2002) | "'03 Bonnie & Clyde" (2002) | "Hovi Baby" (2002) |

Beyoncé Knowles singles chronology
| "Work It Out" (2002) | "'03 Bonnie & Clyde" (2002) | "Crazy in Love" (2003) |

Music video
- "'03 Bonnie & Clyde" on YouTube

"'03 Bonnie & Clyde" is a song recorded by American rapper Jay-Z, released on October 10, 2002, as the lead single from his seventh studio album The Blueprint 2: The Gift & The Curse (2002). Composed by Jay-Z, Kanye West, Darryl Harper, Ricky Rouse and Tyrone Wrice, and featuring Jay-Z's then-girlfriend, now wife, American singer Beyoncé Knowles, "'03 Bonnie & Clyde" sampled its beat from Tupac Shakur's 1996 song "Me and My Girlfriend" (released under Shakur's pseudonym Makaveli), paraphrasing its chorus, as well as Prince's 1987 song "If I Was Your Girlfriend". Inspired by the 1967 crime film Bonnie and Clyde, the song features programmed drums, bass instruments, and a flamenco guitar as instrumentation.

"'03 Bonnie & Clyde" was generally received with favorable reviews by music critics, who complimented the combination of Jay-Z's and Knowles' musical styles and the song's production. The single reached number four on the Billboard Hot 100, becoming Jay-Z's second top ten single and Knowles' first as a solo artist. It charted at number one in Switzerland, number two in the United Kingdom and peaked in the top twenty in other European territories. "'03 Bonnie & Clyde" was certified gold by the Recording Industry Association of America (RIAA) and platinum by the Australian Recording Industry Association (ARIA).

The accompanying music video, directed by Chris Robinson, features Jay-Z and Knowles playing a modern-day version of the 1930s bank robbers Clyde Barrow and Bonnie Parker, and was nominated for Best Hip-Hop Video at the 2003 MTV Video Music Awards. "'03 Bonnie & Clyde" spawned a feud with American recording artist Toni Braxton, who had also sampled "Me and My Girlfriend" in her 2002 song "Me & My Boyfriend" and accused West and Jay-Z of stealing the idea of using the song as a sample (which both men later denied), even though Mariah Carey had earlier sampled the same song by Shakur on the track "How Much" from her 1999 album Rainbow. "'03 Bonnie & Clyde" was performed by Jay-Z and Knowles on several television shows and was later included on the set list of their concert performances and tours, most notably on their co-headlining On the Run and On the Run II tours.

== Production and release ==
"'03 Bonnie & Clyde" marked the first collaboration between rapper Jay-Z and R&B singer Beyoncé Knowles. While listening to American rapper Tupac Shakur's The Don Killuminati: The 7 Day Theory, producer Kanye West suggested that Shakur's song "Me and My Girlfriend" would make a good sample to use on Jay-Z's duet with Knowles. West told MTV News that Jay-Z had asked him on the telephone for a duet for him and Knowles: "We got this joint, it has to be the best beat you ever made." He continued:

So I went home and called my dog, E Base, who plays a lot of instruments up at Baseline [studio] for me and [producer] Just Blaze. [E] came through. I programmed the drums in 10 minutes, and then he played all the different parts. This version is all live bass, live guitars, [live] chords on it. I brought it to Hov that night, he heard it, he thought of the video treatment before he thought of the rap. He just knew it was gonna be the one.

Tensions arose during the conception of "'03 Bonnie & Clyde" over the sampling of "Me and My Girlfriend". Senior Vice President of A&R Tina Davis commented on the issue, "We only had one day to clear the [Tupac Shakur] sample [from 'Me and my Girlfriend'] that was used on "'03 Bonnie and Clyde" last year with Jay-Z and Knowles [Beyoncé]. We were back and forth with Afeni Shakur all day until we got the clearance. And then it's a hit."

"'03 Bonnie & Clyde" was released on October 10, 2002, as the lead single from Jay-Z's album The Blueprint 2: The Gift & The Curse. Knowles later included the song as a bonus track on international editions of her 2003 debut solo album Dangerously in Love. In 2003, Now That's What I Call Music! included "'03 Bonnie & Clyde" as the opening track of the 12th volume of the US release and the fifteenth track of the 54th volume of the UK release. The song's release was the first indication of Jay-Z's and Knowles' romantic status, spawning rumors about a burgeoning relationship. Their relationship was not publicized until Jay-Z featured on Knowles' songs "Crazy In Love" (2003) and "Déjà Vu" (2006).

== Composition ==
"'03 Bonnie & Clyde"
A 20-second sample of "'03 Bonnie & Clyde", which features Jay-Z rapping over the instrumental that samples Tupac's "Me and My Girlfriend". It consists of programmed drums, bass instruments, and chords supplied by a flamenco guitar.

"'03 Bonnie & Clyde" features drums and live instrumentation such as bass instruments and guitar chords. It also consists of a beat sampled from "Me and My Girlfriend". The song was inspired by the 1967 American crime film Bonnie and Clyde as Jay-Z and Knowles proclaim themselves as the current version of the criminal duo Bonnie Parker (Faye Dunaway) and Clyde Barrow (Warren Beatty). Ethan Brown of New York magazine noted that its patina of flamenco guitar was reminiscent of that in Jay-Z's 2001 collaboration with R. Kelly on "Fiesta." Knowles mimics the hook of "Me and My Girlfriend" on the chorus as she sings, "Down to ride to the very end, me and my boyfriend".

Some lyrics sung by Knowles during the bridge were sampled from "If I Was Your Girlfriend" by American recording artist Prince. On the first verse, Jay-Z references the relationship between Bobby Brown and Whitney Houston, and the American television comedy drama series Sex and the City: "I'm mashin' the gas, she's grabbin' the wheel, it's trippy / How hard she rides wit' me, the new Bobby and Whitney / Only time we don't speak is during Sex and the City / She gets Carrie fever, but soon as the show's over / She's right back to being my soldier / 'Cause mami's a rider and I'm a roller / Put us together, how they gon' stop both of us? / Whatever she lacks I'm right over her shoulder (Woo) / When I'm off track, mami is keeping me focused / So let's lock this down like it's supposed to be / The new '03 Bonnie and Clyde, Hov' and B, holla".

== Critical reception ==
"'03 Bonnie & Clyde" was received favorably by critics, who commended the use of different samples, and commented on the relationship between Jay-Z and Knowles. Chris Ryan of Spin magazine described "'03 Bonnie & Clyde" as a highlight on The Blueprint 2: The Gift & the Curse, stating that it consists of "a house party in a crib as big as the Georgia Dome." John Bush from AllMusic included the song as a highlight on the album, further describing it as "a slick R&B crossover with Beyoncé Knowles". Marc L. Hill of PopMatters viewed it as the "obligatory radio song" of the album. Awarding the song a rating of eight out of ten possible points, Dele Fadele of NME complimented it as "a cool duet" between Jay-Z and Knowles. John Robinson of the same publication wrote that as the couple describe their life, it is not all "Lexus and sipping Cris". He added, "A similarly relaxed production makes for a behind-the-diamante-net-curtains classic".

Ethan Brown of New York magazine named "'03 Bonnie & Clyde" as a follow-up to the previous "Bonnie & Clyde Part II" by Jay-Z featuring rapper Foxy Brown. Erik Parker, music editor of Vibe magazine, was divided on the song's sample, writing that it was "tasteless but well-executed", and complimented West's production as "impeccable". Margena A. Christian of Jet magazine praised Jay-Z's and Knowles' collaboration, favoring the former's "dropping lyrics" and the latter's "cooing silky vocals". Chuck Taylor of Billboard magazine wrote that though it was unclear at the time whether the couple were together or not, they created good music together. Taylor praised the song's ability to showcase what each artist does best: Jay-Z "spitting" verses of praise, and Knowles' sweets coos and hooks. Taylor noted that the sampled acoustic guitar "added spice to the track, setting it up for future success". In a more negative review, Nathan Rabin of The A.V. Club described the song as "terrible" and different from the other songs on The Blueprint 2: The Gift & The Curse.

Rap-Up credited "'03 Bonnie & Clyde" for giving Knowles a "little street-credit". The staff members of Vibe magazine placed the song at number two on a list of the best Bonnie and Clyde inspired songs. On a list of the 10 Best Jay-Z Songs, Dean Silfenv of AOL placed "'03 Bonnie & Clyde" at number six. Popjustice listed "'03 Bonnie & Clyde" at number 66 on its list of the best singles of 2003. It was nominated for the Best Collaboration at the 2003 BET Awards, but lost to Snoop Dogg, Pharrell and Uncle Charlie Wilson's song "Beautiful". In a 2013 list of Jay-Z's 20 Biggest Billboard Hits, "'03 Bonnie & Clyde" was ranked at number 6. Elijah Watson and Erika Ramirez of Billboard magazine noted that the song proved the couple was "unstoppable from jump".

== Commercial performance ==
"'03 Bonnie & Clyde" reached the top ten on music charts in six European countries. It peaked at number six on the Norway Singles Chart and on the Danish Singles Chart, number eight on the Italian Singles Chart, and topped the Swiss Singles Charts. In Canada, the song peaked at number four and became Jay-Z's highest-charting single until it was surpassed by his 2009 Alicia Keys-assisted song "Empire State of Mind", which peaked at number three. In the United Kingdom, "'03 Bonnie & Clyde" peaked at number two on the UK Singles Chart. At the time, it became his highest-charting single in Britain since "Hard Knock Life (Ghetto Anthem)" achieved the same feat in November 1998. It peaked at number four on the New Zealand Singles Chart, his highest-charting single in that territory. The song also became Jay-Z's highest-charting single in Australia, where it peaked at number two. "'03 Bonnie & Clyde" was certified platinum by the Australian Recording Industry Association (ARIA), denoting shipment of 70,000 copies.

"'03 Bonnie & Clyde" broke into the top five of the Billboard Hot 100 at number four; it became the highest-charting single that references the famous bank robbers Bonnie and Clyde. The record was previously held by Georgie Fame's 1967 single "The Ballad of Bonnie and Clyde". It also became his highest-charting single in the U.S. at the time. Following the performance of "'03 Bonnie & Clyde" on Saturday Night Live on November 2, 2002, its radio audience increased by 12%, allowing the song to advance into the top ten of the US Hot R&B/Hip-Hop Songs chart, at number seven. This gave Jay-Z his 12th top 10 single, tying him with rapper P. Diddy, who had the same number of top 10 singles on that chart. "'03 Bonnie & Clyde" was his first top 10 since his 2001 single "Girls, Girls, Girls". It was certified gold by the Recording Industry Association of America (RIAA), denoting sales of 500,000 copies. The song sold over 1 million copies in US.

== Music video ==
Chris Robinson directed the song's accompanying music video, which was filmed in Mexico during October 2002 and premiered on MTV on November 8, 2002. June Ambrose was hired as the personal stylist, and Johnathon Schaech and Lance Reddick appear in the video as police officers tailing Jay-Z and Knowles, who play a modern-day version of the 1930s bank robbers Clyde Barrow and Bonnie Parker. The choreography used in the clip suggests a relationship beyond screen, as Jay-Z wraps his arm around Knowles while singing his part of the chorus. Loosely based on the American 1993 romance crime film True Romance, which stars Christian Slater and Patricia Arquette as Clarence Worley and Alabama Whitman two lovers on the run from cocaine dealers, the video also marked a departure for the "clean-cut Beyoncé" and created a symbiotic relationship between her and Jay-Z, allowing them to exchange audiences.

As Jay-Z and Knowles share an intimate moment in a phone-booth, a spray-painted mural is displayed, tributing Tupac Shakur.

The music video begins as police officers, played by Schaech and Reddick, discuss how to catch the criminal duo. As the song begins, Jay-Z is seen driving a gunmetal grey Aston Martin Vanquish while Knowles sits in the passenger seat. As they drive through the sepia sands of Mexico, clips of the police from the beginning of the video are cut into the scene. As Jay-Z and Knowles pull over to a hotel, they cover the car to avoid notice from the police. As the duo count money in the bedroom, the police discover their hiding place and go upstairs only to find that the two have fled the scene in their car. Scenes of Knowles and Jay-Z at a Mexican bar are inter-cut with scenes of an intimate moment between them in a phone-booth, behind which a spray-painted tribute to Tupac Shakur appears on a wall. The duo again elude the police who are following one step behind. After Knowles performs her verse in an empty pool, the police form a blockade on the highway in an attempt to catch her and Jay-Z, only to be stumped again as two gas station attendant decoys are found driving the car. The video ends as Knowles and Jay-Z light a bonfire on the beach and drive away in a different car.

Corey Moss of MTV News noted that the end of the video does not reveal how the "real" Bonnie and Clyde met their end. The story continues in the 2004 video for Jay-Z's song "99 Problems". The music video for "'03 Bonnie & Clyde" was nominated for Best Hip-Hop Video at the 2003 MTV Video Music Awards. In the official top 20 countdown of Jay-Z music videos, MTV UK listed the clip at number 10.

== Controversy ==
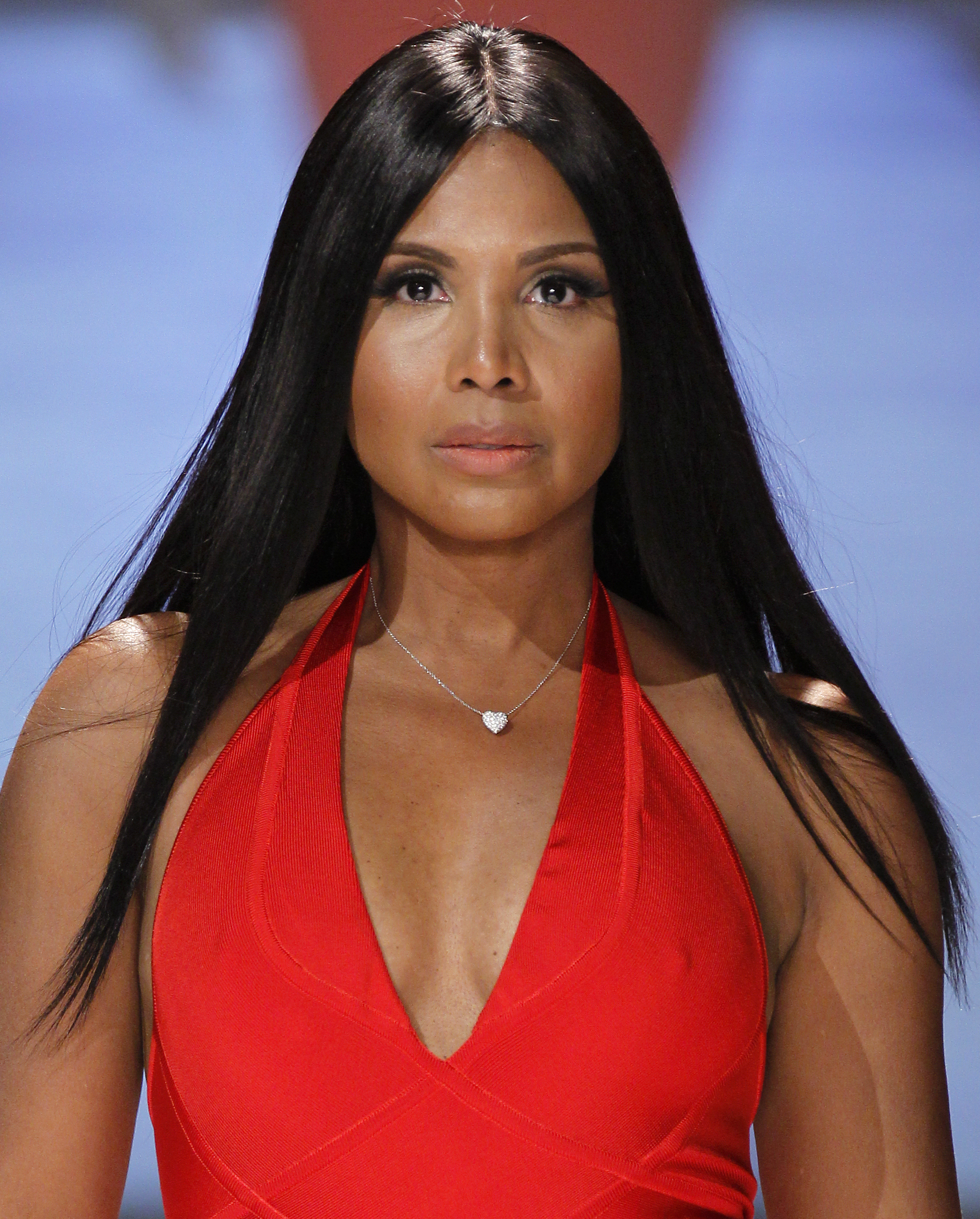
Braxton (pictured) stated "I have kids to feed and this is taking money out of their college funds", due to Jay-Z's sample of "Me and My Girlfriend".

On October 8, 2002, Toni Braxton and her team released a statement claiming that Jay-Z's song "'03 Bonnie & Clyde" had stolen Braxton's idea to sample the 1996 Tupac Shakur song "Me and My Girlfriend". Braxton sampled Shakur's song on the track "Me & My Boyfriend", included on Braxton's album, More Than a Woman (2002). In a call to a New York radio station, hosted by Wendy Williams, Braxton stated that "Jay-Z and Beyoncé are messing with my money. They're trying to steal my mojo". Braxton said her song was recorded over the summer of 2002, and alleged that Jay-Z only decided to do "'03 Bonnie & Clyde" after she played her version of the song for Def Jam Recordings.

Kanye West responded to Braxton's claim in an interview for MTV News, "I had no idea about Toni Braxton's [song]. She can't act like ain't nobody ever heard 'Me and My Girlfriend' before. People hear the song all the time. I can [understand her complaint] if it [was] an original song." West defended the song's sample, stating that the idea came to him after listening to a friend's Makaveli album one night. Roc-A-Fella Records' Co-CEO Damon Dash responded to Braxton's claims:

Jay is a talented dude. I don't think he would steal anything intentionally. It's an ill coincidence, and things happen for a reason. We'll see what happens behind it... I read it in the paper, and Jay and I were talking about it this morning and it was a little funny. I know he didn't intentionally make the same record she made. I don't think he even heard it. [My] reaction is, 'Sorry, it wasn't intentional.' Jay makes records and puts them out. This [sh--] is music. It's just music. We don't sit around and have a blueprint to [f---] anybody's life up. The music business has been good to us. I'm not getting into any beef or nothing over music.

Speaking for MTV News, Jay-Z responded to Braxton's claims: "I wouldn't want to take it from her. I don't even think like that. My first thought would be, 'Maybe I could call her up, maybe I could get on that record.' The most obvious [explanation] is it's neither one of our records. It's not like you made an original idea. She's not in hip-hop, but it happens in hip-hop often. We go to sample the same thing and my record came out first. I'm sorry. What can I do?" He went on saying that if he had known they were both planning to sample the same Tupac Shakur song, he would have arranged a duet with her.

== Live performances ==
On November 2, 2002, Jay-Z and Beyoncé performed the song together at Saturday Night Live. Later, on November 21, 2002, they appeared on MTV's Total Request Live for Spankin' New Music Week where they also performed the song. In 2009, Beyoncé performed an abbreviated version of "'03 Bonnie & Clyde" during her I Am... Yours revue, held at the Encore Las Vegas Theatre in July and August. The song was later included on the 2009 live album I Am... Yours: An Intimate Performance at Wynn Las Vegas which was chronicling the revue. In August 2011, Beyoncé performed "'03 Bonnie & Clyde" again during her revue 4 Intimate Nights with Beyoncé and included the song on the DVD Live at Roseland: Elements of 4 released in November 2011. During the concerts, Beyoncé announced the song by saying, "It's 2002... I started to feel a little lonely till one day...". "'03 Bonnie & Clyde" was included on Jay-Z's live album Live in Brooklyn released on October 11, 2012, after he performed the song during eight shows in Brooklyn. In 2013, Jay-Z included the song on the set list of his Legends of the Summer Stadium Tour.

"'03 Bonnie & Clyde" was part of the set list of Beyoncé and Jay-Z's co-headlining On the Run Tour (2014) where the shows were opened with the performance of the song. A black-and-white video was shown on the screen accompanied by sirens as the duo appeared onstage surrounded by smoke. They started performing the song with Beyoncé wearing a see-through fishnet mask and Jay-Z wearing black sunglasses, a star-speckled shirt, black jacket and gold chains. The song was in line with the show's overall criminal theme.

== Formats and track listings ==
- Digital EP
1. "'03 Bonnie & Clyde" (Radio Edit, Hey Arnold!: The Movie Version) – 3:27
2. "'03 Bonnie & Clyde" (Explicit) – 3:26
3. "U Don't Know" (Remix) (Jay-Z & M.O.P.) – 4:28
- CD single
1. "'03 Bonnie & Clyde" (Radio Edit) – 3:28
2. "U Don't Know" (Remix) – 4:27
3. "'03 Bonnie & Clyde" (Instrumental) – 3:27

== Credits and personnel ==
Adapted from The Blueprint 2: The Gift & The Curse's liner notes.

- E-Base – bass, guitar, instrumentation, Keyboards
- Shawn Carter – vocals (rap), composer
- Jason Goldstein – mixing
- Darryl Harper – composer
- Gimel "Young Guru" Katon – engineer, mixing
- Beyoncé Knowles – vocals
- Prince – additional writing from sample
- Ricky Rouse – composer
- Tupac Shakur – additional writing from sample
- Kanye West – composer, producer
- Shane "Bermy" Woodley – engineer
- Tyrone Wrice – composer

== Charts ==
=== Weekly charts ===
Weekly chart performance for "'03 Bonnie & Clyde"
| Chart (2002–2003) | Peak position |
|---|---|
| Australia (ARIA) | 2 |
| Australian Urban (ARIA) | 2 |
| Austria (Ö3 Austria Top 40) | 28 |
| Belgium (Ultratop 50 Flanders) | 12 |
| Belgium (Ultratop 50 Wallonia) | 12 |
| Canada (Nielsen Soundscan) | 4 |
| Canada CHR (Nielsen BDS) | 17 |
| Croatia (HRT) | 7 |
| Denmark (Tracklisten) | 6 |
| Europe (European Hot 100 Singles) | 2 |
| Finland (Suomen virallinen lista) | 10 |
| France (SNEP) | 25 |
| Germany (GfK) | 6 |
| Hungary (Editors' Choice Top 40) | 30 |
| Ireland (IRMA) | 8 |
| Italy (FIMI) | 8 |
| Netherlands (Dutch Top 40) | 9 |
| Netherlands (Single Top 100) | 5 |
| New Zealand (Recorded Music NZ) | 4 |
| Norway (VG-lista) | 6 |
| Romania (Romanian Top 100) | 22 |
| Scottish Singles Sales (Official Charts) | 7 |
| Sweden (Sverigetopplistan) | 14 |
| Switzerland (Schweizer Hitparade) | 1 |
| UK Singles (Official Charts) | 2 |
| UK Hip Hop/R&B (Official Charts) | 1 |
| US Billboard Hot 100 | 4 |
| US Hot R&B/Hip-Hop Songs (Billboard) | 5 |
| US Pop Airplay (Billboard) | 7 |
| US Rhythmic Airplay (Billboard) | 1 |

| Chart (2026) | Peak position |
|---|---|
| Greece International (IFPI) | 36 |

=== Year-end charts ===
Year-end chart performance for "'03 Bonnie & Clyde"
| Chart (2003) | Position |
|---|---|
| Australian Singles Chart | 16 |
| Australian Urban Singles Chart | 9 |
| Belgian Singles Chart (Flanders) | 80 |
| Belgian Singles Chart (Wallonia) | 66 |
| Dutch Singles Chart | 47 |
| German Singles Chart | 88 |
| Irish Singles Chart | 63 |
| Romania (Romanian Top 100) | 76 |
| Swedish Singles Chart | 91 |
| Swiss Singles Chart | 50 |
| UK Singles Chart | 50 |
| US Billboard Hot 100 | 37 |
| US Hot R&B/Hip-Hop Songs | 59 |
| US Pop Songs | 27 |

== Certifications ==
Certifications and sales for "'03 Bonnie & Clyde"
| Region | Certification | Certified units/sales |
|---|---|---|
| Australia (ARIA) | Platinum | 70,000^{^} |
| New Zealand (RMNZ) | Platinum | 30,000^{‡} |
| United Kingdom (BPI) | Platinum | 600,000^{‡} |
| United States (RIAA) | Platinum | 1,000,000^{‡} |
Streaming
| Greece (IFPI Greece) | Gold | 1,000,000^{†} |
^{^} Shipments figures based on certification alone.^{‡} Sales+streaming figures based on certification alone.^{†} Streaming-only figures based on certification alone.

== See also ==
- "'97 Bonnie & Clyde," 1998 song by Eminem
