= Bad Boys: Miami Takedown =

2004 video game

- Developer: Blitz Games
- Publishers: EU: Empire Interactive; NA: Crave Entertainment
- Director: Chris Swan
- Designers: Adam Breeden; Mark Digger; Russ Earwaker; Leigh Griffiths; Paul Jennings; Chris Sandell; Aron Tomlin
- Programmers: Kieren Bloomfield; Neil Campbell; Alastair Graham
- Artists: Tom Adams; Duncan Nimmo; Robert Price
- Composer: Rob Lord
- Platforms: GameCube, Windows, PlayStation 2, Xbox
- Release: EU: February 27, 2004 (PS2, Xbox); EU: March 12, 2004 (PC); NA: September 21, 2004 (GC, PS2, Xbox); EU: October 15, 2004 (GC)
- Genres: Action-adventure, Third-person shooter
- Mode: Single-player

Bad Boys: Miami Takedown, also known as Bad Boys II in Europe, is a video game developed by Blitz Games and published by Empire Interactive in Europe and Crave Entertainment in North America, that was released in 2004 based on the action-comedy film Bad Boys II. It was released for the GameCube, Windows, PlayStation 2 and Xbox in 2004 after the film's DVD and VHS release in 2003.

== Gameplay ==
The player takes the roles of Miami Police Department detectives Marcus Burnett and Mike Lowrey over alternating levels. The game contains five acts, each containing several levels.

== Plot ==
The game follows up from the events of the film, and starts with a deal taking place between the game's villains. A drug lord known as Tulio Mendoza is infuriated after being ripped off by a Russian businessman named Akimov. The two settle their problems and join forces. Meanwhile, two TNT agents, Ray Jackson and his partner, Lee-Ann Reid, are going to a diner. Jackson sits in the car, while Reid walks inside. While sitting at the counter, the car explodes with Jackson inside and Reid is captured by a gang known as the Baby Demons.

=== Act 1 ===
Marcus and Mike are sent by Captain Howard to rescue the surviving agent and take out the Baby Demons gang. They succeed in rescuing Reid, though not much to Marcus' surprise, who happens to have history with her. Later, the duo are sent to an abandoned house being used as the Baby Demons' hideout, and they soon find the leader: Bossu Williams. Marcus engages the gang leader in a shootout, who later escapes.

=== Act 2 ===
Tatiyana Savin, Akimov's assistant, attempts to get Bossu involved with Mendoza in exchange for Baby Demon territory. Bossu declines, and begins ranting, until he is killed by Tatiyana after calling her a "commie". Then, the Baby Demons rob a bank, and Mike and Marcus are sent to suppress them. Afterwards, Tatiyana takes advantage of the bank robbery and attempts to escape, but crashes her car. She then attempts to escape on foot through the Miami alleyways as Mike and Marcus give chase, fighting their way through the remaining Baby Demons gangsters, and eventually find themselves up against the Russian Mafia, who have arrived to cover Tatiyana's escape. The two split up; Marcus going through the Little M's restaurant, and Mike going up to the roof. While Marcus is cut off, Mike pursues Tatiyana across the Miami rooftops, fighting his way through the Russian Mafia. Tatiyana boards her gunship and uses it against Lowrey. Initially, the helicopter has the upper hand, but Mike prevails and manages to destroy the helicopter, killing Tatiyana. The TNT duo regroups and plans their next mission at an art gallery.

=== Act 3 ===
Mike and Marcus are sent to the Ellipse Modern where they attempt to find out about its connection with the Russians, and it is revealed that it is owned by Kirill Akimov, the guy whose money was torched by Marcus. Burnett goes on alone and manages to take control of the art gallery's security room, spying on Akimov and Jabuti Siro, Mendoza's bodyguard, discussing a deal taking place at the docks. Lowrey uses a silenced weapon to go through another part of the art gallery and find out what the Russians are doing. Eventually, the two become suspicious and think the Russians are guarding something else, which is later revealed to be a drug laboratory. Lowrey destroys the laboratory, and makes an explosive escape, ending up being outgunned by heavily armed Russians. Burnett comes to his partner's aid, as the duo fights their way out of the art gallery.

=== Act 4 ===
Mike, Marcus, and Lee-Ann set to the docks to eliminate Akimov. Burnett goes in alone, while Mike provides sniper support, with Reid spotting. Marcus makes it inside, and overlooks the deal between Mendoza and Akimov. While doing so, he soon finds out that Jackson, the agent who was presumably killed in the car explosion early in the game, is still alive, and is working with Mendoza. Marcus fights his way out of the warehouse, battling not only the remaining Russian Mafia, but the newly arriving Colombian Cartel. Mike hands Marcus his sniper rifle, while he goes onto Akimov's boat. On it, Akimov appears, holding Lee-Ann hostage. Running out of options, Marcus, with correct timing and patience, manages to snipe Akimov. Lee-Ann reveals that she put a tracker on Mendoza's boat, and the three give chase.

=== Act 5 ===
Mike, Marcus, and Lee-Ann assault Mendoza's mansion, fighting their way through his private army of Colombian Cartel thugs. While Marcus and Mike clear the mansion, Lee-Ann confronts Ray Jackson. After a conversation, Jackson is shot and killed by Mendoza, who later escapes. Marcus arrives, and eventually confronts Mendoza's bodyguard, Siro. Marcus defeats Siro, and he and Mike regroup to finish off the Colombian Cartel. The duo fights their way to Mendoza, who awaits them on a large cannon. With Marcus drawing Mendoza's fire, and Mike shooting him, the two manage to defeat the drug lord. Mendoza pleads desperately, and takes their attention away to pull a hidden weapon, disarming Mike. Marcus kicks him Mendoza's Gold Enforcer, and he finishes off the drug lord, who lands right next to Ciro. The TNT agents, including Lee-Ann, regroup. Mike and Marcus exchange bickering, much to Lee-Ann's annoyance, who scolds them both. Despite being stuck on the island, the three walk away victorious.

== Reception ==
Reception

Aggregate score
Aggregator	Score			
Aggregator	GameCube	PC	PS2	Xbox
Metacritic	35/100	43/100	36/100	35/100

Review scores
Publication	Score			
Publication	GameCube	PC	PS2	Xbox
Game Informer	5/10	N/A	4/10	4/10
GameSpot	3/10	N/A	3/10	3/10
GameZone	N/A	N/A	3/10	N/A
IGN	3.6/10	4.8/10	3.6/10	3.6/10
Nintendo Power	5/10	N/A	N/A	N/A
PlayStation Official Magazine – UK	N/A	N/A	1/10	N/A
Official Xbox Magazine (US)	N/A	N/A	N/A	1/10
PC Gamer (UK)	N/A	36%	N/A	N/A
TeamXbox	N/A	N/A	N/A	3.8/10
X-Play	1/5	N/A	1/5	1/5
The Times	N/A	1/5	1/5	1/5

Bad Boys: Miami Takedown received "generally unfavorable reviews" on all platforms according to video game review aggregator Metacritic.

The game was declared #10 worst for GameTrailers' "Top Ten Best And Worst Videogames".

Despite the negative reviews, the game would go on to be Blitz Games' most successful in terms of sales in the UK.
