= La-La-La (Jay-Z song) =

Single by Jay-Z

from the album Bad Boys II: The Soundtrack and Blueprint 2.1
- Released: April 29, 2003
- Recorded: March 2003
- Studio: Baseline Recording Studios (New York City); Master Sound Studios (Virginia Beach, Virginia)
- Genre: East Coast hip-hop
- Length: 3:52
- Label: Bad Boy; Universal; Roc-A-Fella; Def Jam
- Songwriters: Shawn Carter; Pharrell Williams; Charles Hugo
- Producer: The Neptunes

Jay-Z singles chronology
"Excuse Me Miss" (2003)	"La-La-La" (2003)	"Crazy in Love" (2003)

Music video
- "La-La-La (Excuse Me Again)" on YouTube

"La-La-La" (alternatively known as "La-La-La (Excuse Me Miss Again)") is a song by American rapper Jay-Z. It was released on April 29, 2003, as the second single released from the Bad Boys II soundtrack (it was later put on the album as the third track), and was also the lead and only single to Blueprint 2.1, a reissue of The Blueprint 2: The Gift & the Curse, where it became the 13th track on the album and the first bonus track on the 8th of April, a few weeks prior. The song is a sequel to his previous single as a main artist, "Excuse Me Miss", as indicated by the alternate title to the song.

== Recording and release ==
The song was recorded in March 2003 in Baseline Recording Studios and Master Sound Studios (based in New York City, New York and Virginia Beach, Virginia respectively). In an interview with Pitchfork, Chad Hugo of the Neptunes recalled: "There were just good vibes around 'La-La-La.' Back in the day it was like a celebration every time we finished a song: The engineer would play it back, and it was like a party before the party. I made the synth sound on this song by messing around with the sound design in some programs. There were two synth sounds, they call it a Hoover synth, and it has two layers to it, and one is de-tuned, so the song has this harsh, distorted feel. It's a track that gets the crowd hyped. That's a good motive to have for a song."

The song was originally released on Blueprint 2.1, a reissue of Jay-Z's (at the time) new studio album, The Blueprint 2: The Gift and the Curse, as the 13th track and the first bonus track to the album on the 8th of April, 2003. It was then released as the lead single to the reissue on the 29th of April that same year. This single release doubled as the second single to the Bad Boys II soundtrack, where it became the third track to the album on the 15th of July, again, that same year.

== Reception ==
The song, although not reaching the Billboard Hot 100, did reach number 37 on the Hot R&B/Hip-Hop Songs chart, number 20 on the Hot Rap Songs chart, and number 12 on the Bubbling Under Hot 100 Singles chart, all in the United States of America.

Vulture ranked all Jay-Z songs, giving this track number 67 and commenting, "Rather than a remix, this is a complete reimagining of the genteel 'Excuse Me Miss.' The Neptunes cook up some humming synths and soft bongos for Jay to stroke his own ego in rhyme."

== Charts ==
Chart (2003)	Peak position
US Bubbling Under Hot 100 (Billboard)	12
US Hot R&B/Hip-Hop Songs (Billboard)	37
US Hot Rap Songs (Billboard)	20
