= Excuse Me Miss =

2003 single by Jay-Z

Single by Jay-Z

from the album The Blueprint 2: The Gift & the Curse
- Released: January 27, 2003
- Studio: Baseline (New York City); Master Sound (Virginia Beach, Virginia)
- Genre: Hip-hop
- Length: 4:41 (album version); 3:58 (radio edit)
- Label: Roc-A-Fella; Def Jam
- Songwriters: Shawn Carter; Pharrell Williams; Chad Hugo
- Producer: The Neptunes

Jay-Z singles chronology
"Hovi Baby" (2002)	"Excuse Me Miss" (2003)	"La-La-La" (2003)

Pharrell singles chronology
"Beautiful" (2003)	"Excuse Me Miss" (2003)	"Belly Dancer" (2003)

Music video
- "Excuse Me Miss" on YouTube

"Excuse Me Miss" is a song by American rapper Jay-Z. It released through his Roc-A-Fella Records and Def Jam Recordings on January 27, 2003, as a single for his seventh studio album The Blueprint 2: The Gift & The Curse (2002). It was also written alongside producers the Neptunes, whose Pharrell Williams sings the hook in falsetto voice (uncredited). The lyrics refer to love at first sight. It contains a more mature sound in comparison of his previous songs about women such as "Girls, Girls, Girls" and "I Just Wanna Love U (Give It 2 Me)". The song samples Prince's 1990 song "Walk Don't Walk," the 2001 hit, "Take You Out" by Luther Vandross as well as "Big Poppa" by the Notorious B.I.G.

"Excuse Me Miss" was the third and final single from The Blueprint 2: The Gift & The Curse and was successful commercially. It peaked at #8 on the Billboard Hot 100 and #1 on the Billboard R&B chart in April, and was nominated for Best Rap Song at the 46th Annual Grammy Awards but lost to Eminem's "Lose Yourself". The music video for the single was released in early February 2003.

The sequel to "Excuse Me Miss" was "La-La-La (Excuse Me Miss Again)" with a noticeably darker beat and lyrics, and was also produced by the Neptunes. The song was later re-released with "Stop" as a single for 2003's The Blueprint 2.1.

== Music video ==
The music video for "Excuse Me Miss" was filmed in New York and New Jersey in January 2003. It was directed by Little X and produced by Ericka Danko. It stars Jay-Z and Jeannette Chaves. The video also features cameo appearances from State Property, who appear in the scenes at the nightclub with Jay-Z, and DJ Clue, who is seen on the dancefloor. In the storyline, Jay-Z and Chaves end up in an elevator alone and catch each other's eye. Jay-Z then has a premonition of their relationship and seduces her with his lavish lifestyle. At the end of the video, Jay-Z approaches her. The other video vixens featured are Jacqueline Roda, Maria Bencebi, Nancy Erminia, Miya Granatella, Liris Crosse, Jayde Steele, Abeba Davis, Cynthia Rodriguez, and Angela Smith.

Chaves won Sexiest Video Vixen at the inaugural Vibe Awards.

== Formats and track listings ==
Vinyl cover of "Excuse Me Miss"

United Kingdom cover of "Excuse Me Miss"

Excuse Me Miss – United States CD, vinyl 12"

1. A1 "Excuse Me Miss" (Radio) (4:18)
2. A2 "Excuse Me Miss" (Explicit) (4:41)
3. A3 "Excuse Me Miss" (Instrumental) (4:40)
4. B1 "The Bounce" (Clean) (featuring Kanye West) (4:18)
5. B2 "F**k All Nite" (Clean Album Version) (4:19)

Excuse Me Miss / The Bounce – United States 12 '' vinyl

1. A1 "Excuse Me Miss" (Radio)
2. A2 "Excuse Me Miss" (LP Version)
3. A3 "Excuse Me Miss" (Instrumental)
4. B1 "The Bounce" (Radio) (featuring Kanye West)
5. B2 "The Bounce" (LP Version) (featuring Kanye West)
6. B3 "The Bounce" (Instrumental) (featuring Kanye West)

Excuse Me Miss – United Kingdom CD single

1. "Excuse Me Miss" (Radio Edit)
2. "Heart of the City (Ain't No Love)" (Live)

Excuse Me Miss – United Kingdom 12" vinyl

1. A1 "Excuse Me Miss" (Album Version – Explicit) (4:41)
2. A2 "Excuse Me Miss" (Instrumental) (4:40)
3. B "Heart of the City (Ain't No Love)" (Live at Wembley, London) (2:51)

== Charts ==
=== Weekly charts ===
Chart (2003)	Peak position
ARIA Charts	38
Australian Urban (ARIA)	16
Canadian Singles Chart	8
UK Singles Chart	17
US Billboard Hot 100	8
US Billboard Hot R&B/Hip-Hop Songs	1
US Billboard Hot Rap Tracks	2

=== Year-end charts ===
Chart (2003)	Position
UK Urban (Music Week)	30
US Billboard Hot 100	54

== Certifications ==
Certifications for "Excuse Me Miss"
Region	Certification	Certified units/sales
United States (RIAA)	Gold	500,000^{‡}
^{‡} Sales+streaming figures based on certification alone.

== Release history ==
Region	Date	Format(s)	Label(s)	Ref.
United States	January 27, 2003	Rhythmic contemporary · urban contemporary radio	Roc-A-Fella, IDJMG	

== Remix ==
"Excuse Me Miss Again (Remix)"

Song by Jay-Z featuring Kanye West

from the album Freshmen Adjustment 2
- Released: April 17, 2006
- Genre: Hip-hop
- Length: 3:26
- Label: Roc-A-Fella; Def Jam
- Songwriters: Shawn Carter; Pharrell Williams
- Producer: Kanye West

A remix of the song was released featuring Kanye West, which ended up on West's 2006 mixtape Freshmen Adjustment 2.

== See also ==
- List of songs recorded by Jay-Z
