= Bad Boys (1995 film) =

1995 film by Michael Bay

- Theatrical release poster
- Directed by: Michael Bay
- Screenplay by: Michael Barrie; Jim Mulholland; Doug Richardson
- Story by: George Gallo
- Produced by: Don Simpson; Jerry Bruckheimer
- Starring: Martin Lawrence; Will Smith; Téa Leoni; Tchéky Karyo; Theresa Randle; Joe Pantoliano
- Cinematography: Howard Atherton
- Edited by: Christian Wagner
- Music by: Mark Mancina
- Production companies: Columbia Pictures; Don Simpson/Jerry Bruckheimer Films
- Distributed by: Sony Pictures Releasing
- Release date: April 7, 1995
- Running time: 119 minutes
- Country: United States
- Language: English
- Budget: $19–23 million
- Box office: $141 million

Bad Boys is a 1995 American action comedy film directed by Michael Bay (in his feature directorial debut) and produced by Don Simpson and Jerry Bruckheimer, from a screenplay written by Doug Richardson and the writing team of Michael Barrie and Jim Mulholland, and a story conceived by George Gallo. The film stars Martin Lawrence and Will Smith as Marcus Burnett and Mike Lowrey, two Miami narcotics detectives who are investigating $100 million worth of stolen packs of heroin and must also protect a woman (Téa Leoni) from a drug dealer after she witnesses a key murder. Tchéky Karyo, Theresa Randle, and Joe Pantoliano also appear in supporting roles.

The film was released on April 7, 1995, by Sony Pictures Releasing. It received mixed reviews from critics, and was commercially successful, grossing $141 million against a $19–23 million budget, and spawning three sequels: Bad Boys II (2003), Bad Boys for Life (2020), and Bad Boys: Ride or Die (2024).

== Plot ==
Lifelong friends Mike Lowrey and Marcus Burnett are devoted Miami Police narcotics detectives investigating $100 million of seized Mafia heroin, their biggest career bust, which has been stolen from a secure police vault. Internal Affairs suspects that it was an inside job and threatens to shut down the entire department unless they recover the drugs within 72 hours.

Mike asks one of his informants and ex-girlfriend Maxine "Max" Logan to look for people who are newly rich and, therefore, suspects. She gets herself and her best friend, Julie Mott, hired as escorts by Eddie Dominguez, a crooked former cop.

The party is soon interrupted by Dominguez's French drug kingpin employer, Antoine Fouchet, and his henchmen, Casper, Ferguson, and Noah Trafficante (who informed Fouchet of Eddie's recklessness). Fouchet, sensing that Max has seen too much, shoots and kills her. He also shoots Eddie in the leg, realizing he is a liability, and has his henchman kill Eddie. Julie hides in the bathroom and escapes as the madam who hired Julie and Max is killed by Noah, who then knocks out Mike as he investigates Max's murder.

Calling the police, Julie insists on talking to only Mike, who is following up on a lead with the madam. Certain that she has never met Mike, Captain Conrad Howard forces Marcus to impersonate him to talk to her. At her apartment, Marcus and Julie are attacked by some of Fouchet's henchmen, one of whom Marcus kills.

Captain Howard forces Marcus and Mike to imitate each other, with Mike living at the Burnett residence while Marcus stays with Julie at Mike's. Looking through mugshots, Julie identifies Noah as one of the henchmen. The partners go to one of Noah's local hangouts, and she follows unbeknown to them. After being spotted, Marcus knocks Casper unconscious. Julie tries to kill Fouchet, but Marcus stops her. In the proceeding car chase, Mike kills Noah by shooting barrels filled with ether, which destroys the villain's car. They escape, but are caught on camera by a news helicopter. The ensuing report is later seen by Marcus's family, who were told that he had been temporarily reassigned to Cleveland.

Mike and Marcus meet their old informant Jojo and understand about the location of the chemist who is cutting the stolen drugs. They return to Mike's apartment, where Marcus's wife Theresa confronts them and confirms Julie's suspicion they have been impersonating each other. Fouchet and his gang show up and kidnap Julie.

Mike and Marcus's department is shut down by Internal Affairs. Despite being reassigned, Howard delays the order, giving Mike and Marcus more time to solve the case. They access Dominguez's private police database profile and learn that the police secretary Francine is his former girlfriend. She was being blackmailed by Fouchet and Dominguez after they took nude photos of her, threatening to post them at her kids' school.

Mike, Marcus, and detectives Sanchez and Ruiz head to the Miami-Opa Locka Executive Airport. During a shootout, they kill Fouchet's remaining henchmen and rescue Julie. They chase Fouchet and force his car into a concrete barrier. As he flees, Mike shoots him in the leg. Fouchet draws a gun but is shot dead by Mike. An exhausted Marcus leaves Julie with Mike handcuffing them to each other and heads home, eager to spend quality time with his wife.

== Cast ==
- Martin Lawrence as Detective Sergeant Marcus Miles Burnett
- Will Smith as Detective Sergeant Michael Eugene "Mike" Lowrey
- Téa Leoni as Julie Mott
- Tchéky Karyo as Antoine Fouchet
- Theresa Randle as Theresa Burnett
- Joe Pantoliano as Captain Conrad Howard
- Marg Helgenberger as Captain Alison Sinclair
- Nestor Serrano as Detective Sanchez
- Julio Oscar Mechoso as Detective Ruiz
- Saverio Guerra as Chet
- Anna Thompson as Francine
- Kevin Corrigan as Elliot
- Michael Imperioli as Joe "Jo-Jo"
- Vic Manni as Ferguson
- Frank John Hughes as Casper
- Ralph Gonzales as Kuni
- Marc Macaulay as Noah Trafficante
- Emmanuel Xuereb as Eddie Dominguez
- John Salley as Fletcher (credited as Hacker "Fletcher")
- Karen Alexander as Max Logan
- Shaun Toub as Store Clerk
- Mario Ernesto Sánchez as Drug Buyer
- Kim Coates as White Carjacker (uncredited)
- Michael Taliferro as Black Carjacker
- Ed Amatrudo as Van Boss
- Lisa Boyle as Girl Decoy

== Development ==
In the film's early stages of development, Simpson and Bruckheimer initially envisioned Dana Carvey and Jon Lovitz in the roles. When the film was written for Carvey and Lovitz, the original title for Bad Boys was Bulletproof Hearts. The film was initially set up at Hollywood Pictures, a Walt Disney Studios subsidiary, but it was placed into turnaround by management and sold the project to Columbia Pictures. Arsenio Hall turned down the role of Lowrey and claims that choice as the worst mistake he has ever made. The role eventually went to Smith.

== Production ==
Principal photography began on June 27, 1994, at the Dade Tire company near downtown Miami, the city chosen to replace the original New York locale. Filming continued throughout the area, including South Beach's Tides Hotel, the Mediterranean Biltmore Hotel, the Dade County Courthouse and a multimillion-dollar estate on a private island. The second floor of downtown Miami's Alfred DuPont building was converted into a police station; a freighter on the Miami River into a drug lab. Bad Boys’s' climactic scenes were filmed at the Opa-Locka Airport. Both Lawrence and Smith were starring in their own hit television sitcoms, Martin and The Fresh Prince of Bel-Air, when filming Bad Boys; filming was quick due to the television schedules of the stars with production wrapping on August 31. The opening sequence was written and shot during post-production.

=== Improvisation ===
Director Bay did not like the script and often engaged Smith and Lawrence in discussions about how the dialogue and scenes could improve. He often allowed them to improvise while the cameras were rolling. He secretly told Smith to call Lawrence a bitch before the car scene. The line "two bitches in the sea" was improvised, as was Lawrence's comment when Leoni called him gay. The scene in the convenience store, when the clerk puts a gun to Burnett and Lowrey's heads and yells, telling them to "Freeze, mother bitches!", is also improvised. They came up with: "No, you freeze, bitch! Now back up, put the gun down and get me a pack of Tropical Fruit Bubbalicious". "And some Skittles." According to Bay in the DVD commentary, at the end of the film when Mike and Marcus are recuperating, Mike says "I love you, man." Bay claims that Smith refused to say the line, causing the director and actor to argue back and forth over the line. Bay wanted Smith to say the line as he felt it summed up the friendship between the cops. After their argument had lasted for half of the day's shoot and much of the crew was ready to pack up, a fed up Bay told Smith to do whatever he wanted, after which Smith changed his mind and agreed to say the line.

== Reception ==
=== Box office ===
Bad Boys generated a total of $15.5 million during its opening weekend, beating out A Goofy Movie and Tommy Boy to reach the number one spot. For its second weekend, it remained at the top spot with $11 million. Despite being dethroned by While You Were Sleeping, the film still made $7 million in its third weekend, while also outgrossing Kiss of Death. Bad Boys was commercially successful, grossing $141,407,024 worldwide — $65,807,024 in North America and $75,600,000 internationally.

=== Critical reception ===
On Rotten Tomatoes, Bad Boys holds an approval rating of 44% based on 70 reviews, with an average rating of 5.3/10. The site's critical consensus reads: "Bad Boys stars Will Smith and Martin Lawrence have enjoyable chemistry; unfortunately, director Michael Bay too often drowns it out with set pieces and explosions in place of an actual story." On Metacritic, the film has a weighted average score of 41 out of 100, based on 24 critics, indicating "mixed or average" reviews. Audiences polled by CinemaScore gave the film an average grade of "A" on an A+ to F scale.

Most criticisms argued that, despite the production of the film and the ability of the stars, the script did not diverge from the generic plot of a buddy-cop genre film, instead opting for repeated use of formulaic scenes.

On the television show At the Movies, Roger Ebert noted that despite the highly energetic approach of the two lead actors and the visual style of the film, their acting talents were mostly "new wine in old bottles". He argued that many of the elements featured in the film, such as stock characters and other police film cliches as well as overly long action scenes, were recycled from other films, particularly those from the Lethal Weapon and Beverly Hills Cop series. He stated, "Whenever a movie like this starts to drag, there's always one infallible solution; have a car-chase and then blow something up real good." Ebert gave the film 2 out of 4 stars. On the same broadcast, Gene Siskel said that he had lost interest in the film after its introduction due to the very formulaic approach, and repeated Roger Ebert's criticism that the talents of the lead actors were wasted, suggesting that the production company did not spend significant time producing a script which would be suitable for their talents. Siskel gave the film 2 out of 4.

== Home media ==
Bad Boys was released on VHS and LaserDisc on November 7, 1995. It would then premiere DVD on June 27, 2000. A UMD was released on December 20, 2005. A Blu-ray release followed on June 1, 2010. Bad Boys was released in a two movie pack that includes its successor Bad Boys II on Ultra HD Blu-ray on September 4, 2018.

== See also ==
- Bad Boys (franchise)
- Bade Miyan Chote Miyan (1998), an Indian film inspired by Bad Boys.
