= Bad Boys II =

2003 film by Michael Bay

- Theatrical release poster
- Directed by: Michael Bay
- Screenplay by: Ron Shelton; Jerry Stahl
- Story by: Cormac Wibberley Marianne Wibberley; Ron Shelton
- Based on: Characters by George Gallo
- Produced by: Jerry Bruckheimer
- Starring: Martin Lawrence; Will Smith; Jordi Mollà; Gabrielle Union; Peter Stormare; Theresa Randle; Joe Pantoliano
- Cinematography: Amir Mokri
- Edited by: Mark Goldblatt; Thomas A. Muldoon; Roger Barton
- Music by: Trevor Rabin
- Production companies: Columbia Pictures; Don Simpson/Jerry Bruckheimer Films (Note: Jerry Bruckheimer Films used the Don Simpson/Jerry Bruckheimer Films logo in memory of Don Simpson, who co-produced the first film.)
- Distributed by: Sony Pictures Releasing
- Release date: July 18, 2003
- Running time: 147 minutes
- Country: United States
- Language: English
- Budget: $130 million
- Box office: $273.3 million

Bad Boys II is a 2003 American action comedy film directed by Michael Bay and produced by Jerry Bruckheimer, from a screenplay written by Ron Shelton and Jerry Stahl, and a story by Shelton and the writing team of Cormac Wibberley and Marianne Wibberley. It serves as the sequel to the 1995 film Bad Boys, in addition to being the second film in the Bad Boys film series. Martin Lawrence, Will Smith, Theresa Randle, and Joe Pantoliano reprise their roles from the previous film, and they are joined by new cast members including Jordi Mollà, Gabrielle Union, and Peter Stormare. The film follows detectives Marcus Burnett and Mike Lowrey investigating the flow of illegal drugs going into Miami.

The film was released on July 18, 2003, by Sony Pictures Releasing. It received generally negative reviews from critics; however, it performed well commercially, grossing $273.3 million worldwide against a $130 million budget, becoming the tenth-highest-grossing film of 2003. Two sequels, Bad Boys for Life and Bad Boys: Ride or Die, were released in 2020 and 2024, respectively.

== Plot ==
Eight years after taking down Fouchet, (Note: As depicted in Bad Boys (1995 film).) Miami PD detectives Mike Lowrey and Marcus Burnett are investigating drug trafficking of MDMA in Miami. They infiltrate a Ku Klux Klan meeting, only to discover that they are buyers, not distributors. After a radio malfunction leads to a delayed arrival of the Miami Police's Tactical Narcotics Team (TNT), Mike and Marcus end up in a shootout with the Klansmen. While covering Marcus, Mike inadvertently shoots him in the buttocks.

These antics reinforce Marcus's doubt as to whether he should stay partners with Mike, who is secretly dating Syd, Marcus's younger sister. Marcus waits to tell Mike he is transferring out of the TNT Unit. Unbeknownst to both, Syd works undercover for the DEA as a money launderer for the Russian mafia branch in Miami, who are acting as middleman distributors via their nightclubs for drug baron Hector Juan Carlos "Johnny" Tapia.

After laundering the money, Syd is intercepted by a Haitian American Zoe Pound gang while transporting it. Mike and Marcus, following an informant's tip, engage in a massive gun battle and car chase through downtown Miami and the MacArthur Causeway, causing major damage. Captain Howard reprimands them and is upset that the DEA is investigating the city without his knowledge.

Mike and Marcus track down the Haitians, interrogate the leader, and learn from a video that Tapia uses a local mortuary as a front. They pose as pest exterminators at Tapia's Miami home for more intel. Meanwhile, Tapia strong-arms the Russian Mafia kingpin Alexei into signing over ownership of all the Florida nightclubs owned by the Russian mafia by dismembering his lieutenant Josef and threatening Alexei's family, thereby giving Tapia uncontested control of the Miami drug trade. Mike and Marcus stumble upon the remains of Josef during their search and take a severed finger for an ID. Impressed with Syd's work, Tapia starts a mixed business-personal relationship with her, planning for her to launder all his money.

Later, Mike and Marcus battle Tapia's henchmen at a bank, and one of them is electrocuted on a monorail line. Then the pair infiltrate Tapia's mortuary. Inside, they discover that Tapia is using cadavers and coffins to smuggle drugs and money in and out of the country. The evidence is sufficient for Captain Howard to authorize a raid on both Tapia's residence and the mortuary, in collaboration with the DEA and the U.S. Coast Guard.

Almost all of Tapia's drug supply and money are confiscated in the raid. Tapia flees to Cuba with Syd as a hostage after learning she is a DEA agent during the raid on his home. He demands his money back in 48 hours, using Syd as a bargaining chip. Mike and Marcus form a black-ops team with the DEA, TNT, and Howard's contacts from the CIA to rescue Syd. They are inserted by the Coast Guard off Cuba, where they meet Tito, Vargas's brother, who leads the local Alpha 66 resistance. Tito helps with weapons, tunnels, and mapping Tapia's mansion.

The team raids Tapia's estate, kills Alexei, rescues Syd, and leaves a large explosive device that demolishes the mansion upon the team's exfiltration. Marcus, Mike, Syd and Tito steal a yellow Hummer H2 as they escape from Cuban military forces controlled by Tapia. Tapia survives and pursues the group, ultimately ending up outside of Guantanamo Bay. Not recognized as U.S. citizens, the Navy personnel on the base shoot at both Mike and Marcus as well as Tapia's vehicles, prompting them to stop just as they enter a live minefield. Marcus kills Tapia with a headshot while the latter holds Mike at gunpoint. Tapia's body falls backward onto a mine, which obliterates his corpse.

Mike, Marcus, and Syd celebrate at a barbecue in Marcus's backyard with his family; Marcus has chosen to remain partners with Mike.

== Cast ==
- Martin Lawrence as Detective Lt. Marcus Burnett, Miami Police Department narcotics detective and Mike's partner and best friend
- Will Smith as Detective Lt. Mike Lowrey, Miami Police Department narcotics detective and Marcus's partner and best friend
- Gabrielle Union as DEA Agent Syd Burnett, Marcus' younger sister and Mike's love interest.
- Jordi Mollà as Johnny Tapia, a Cuban drug kingpin
- Joe Pantoliano as Captain Conrad Howard
- Yul Vazquez as Detective Mateo Reyes
- Jason Olazabal as Detective Marco Vargas
- Peter Stormare as Alexei
- Otto Sanchez as Carlos
- Jon Seda as Roberto
- Michael Shannon as Floyd Poteet
- Oleg Taktarov as Josef Kuninskavich
- John Salley as Fletcher
- Reynaldo Gallegos as Tito Vargas
- Antoni Corone as DEA Agent Tony Dodd
- Henry Rollins as TNT leader
- Treva Etienne as "Icepick"
- Kiko Ellsworth as "Blondie Dread"
- Theresa Randle as Theresa Burnett, Marcus's wife
- Scott Cumberbatch as Quincy Burnett
- Bianca Bethune as Megan Burnett
- Dennis Greene as Reggie Norman
- Gloria Irizarry as Donna Maria Tapia
- Ivelin Giro as Mike's police psychologist
- Dan Marino as Himself
- Michael Bay as Crappy Car Driver
- Mason Rock Bay as Mason the Mastiff
- Megan Fox as Bikini Dancer (Uncredited)

== Production ==
=== Development and writing ===
In August 1995, the Los Angeles Times reported that producers Jerry Bruckheimer and Don Simpson were planning to make a sequel to Bad Boys, with filming set to begin in 1996. Director Tom Dey had re-written a previous draft, and was set to make his directorial debut on the film. By 1997, plans were scrapped after Sony executives were dissatisfied with the script. Jonathan Dayton and Valerie Faris turned down an offer to direct the film. Cormac and Marianne Wibberley were asked by an executive at Jerry Bruckheimer Films to come in with an idea for the sequel, the duo wrote a first draft, pitched it, and Bruckheimer liked it.

In March 2002, it was reported that Ron Shelton was rewriting the script. Jerry Stahl was hired and did a rewrite on Shelton's script, initially brought on board for a week-long rewrite of the script, he wound up staying on for several weeks, Stahl would later claim that only snippets of his dialogue remain in the film.

John Lee Hancock was then hired by the studio and Bruckheimer to do a rewrite, Michael Bay initially balked at Bruckheimer's choice of Hancock, skeptical that the writer was right for an action movie, as Bruckheimer recalled: "I reminded Michael that John was a director himself, so he knows a director’s problems and how to solve them". Hancock was tasked with making the script less simplistic, in addition to adding subplots, and more conflict, giving each protagonist a secret. Hancock left after three weeks to start production on The Alamo. Judd Apatow was hired to do a rewrite on the script, with assistance from Seth Rogen and Evan Goldberg. According to Rogen, he and Goldberg were broke, so Apatow gave them a bit of money to help him on the script, and they ended up contributing a few gags. After Apatow's rewrite, Brian Koppelman and David Levien were brought in towards the end of shooting to do punch up work on the characters; they worked on the script for a week.

Other writers, such as Ron Bass, Dick Clement and Ian La Frenais, Larry Ferguson, George Gallo, Tony Gilroy, Dan Gordon, Brian Helgeland, Gregory Allen Howard, Todd Robinson, and Marshall Todd were brought in at various points throughout the developmental process to either write their own draft, or rewrite the script. The final screenplay was credited to Ron Shelton and Jerry Stahl, with story credit going to Shelton and the Wibberleys.

=== Filming ===
Principal photography took place between July and December 2002, mostly in Miami. The eastbound lanes for MacArthur Causeway were shut down in early August 2002 to allow filming. Filming also occupied one side of Bill Baggs Cape Florida State Park, while 2 Fast 2 Furious was shot on the other side around the same time.

== Reception ==
=== Box office ===
Bad Boys II was a financial success. For its opening weekend, the film generated $46.5 million, making it the fourth-highest opening weekend for an R-rated film, behind The Matrix Reloaded, Hannibal, and 8 Mile. It managed to beat out Pirates of the Caribbean: The Curse of the Black Pearl (another Bruckheimer production) to reach the number one spot. Although Bad Boys II dropped into third place behind the latter film and Spy Kids 3-D: Game Over with a 52.6% decline, it still made $22 million while keeping above Lara Croft: Tomb Raider – The Cradle of Life and Seabiscuit. In the United Kingdom, it made $10 million, making it the country's second-highest-grossing film released in October 2003, behind Finding Nemo. The film made $138.6 million North America and $134.7 million in other territories, totaling $273.3 million worldwide against a budget of $130 million, almost twice the gross of the original film, and was the tenth-highest-grossing film of 2003.

=== Critical response ===
On Rotten Tomatoes, Bad Boys II holds an approval rating of 23% based on 183 reviews, with an average rating of 4.40/10. The site's critical consensus states, "Two and a half hours of explosions and witless banter." On Metacritic, the film has a weighted average score of 38 out of 100, based on 34 critics, indicating "generally unfavorable" reviews. Audiences polled by CinemaScore gave the film an average grade of "A" on an A+ to F scale, same as the first film.

Roger Ebert of the Chicago Sun-Times gave the film one out of a possible four stars, especially offended by one scene involving a teenage boy and the use of the N-Word, saying, "The needless cruelty of this scene took me out of the movie and into the minds of its makers. What were they thinking? Have they so lost touch with human nature that they think audiences will like this scene?" On an episode of At the Movies with Ebert & Roeper, film critic Richard Roeper named Bad Boys II the worst film of 2003.

James Berardinelli of ReelViews was even more negative about the film, rating it half a star out of four and stating: "Bad Boys II isn't just bad - it's a catastrophic violation of every aspect of cinema that I as a film critic hold dear." Jon Caramanica of The Village Voice explained that "Bad Boys 2 plays like a flashy highlight reel from Grand Theft Auto: Vice City." Ed Gonzalez of Slant Magazine gave the film zero out of four stars, stating that "Michael Bay's latest jingoistic fetish film, Bad Boys II, could be the most vile creation to come out of Hollywood since Patch Adams."

Among the more positive reviews was Seattle Post-Intelligencer critic Ellen A. Kim, who wrote that the film was "mindlessly fun... If you like this type of movie, that is." The film was also praised by a few critics and viewers for its deftly handled action sequences and visual effects.

=== Accolades ===
At the 2004 MTV Movie Awards, the film was nominated for "Best Action Sequence" for the inter-coastal freeway pursuit and "Best On-Screen Team", but lost to The Lord of the Rings: The Return of the King and 50 First Dates, respectively.

Bad Boys II was nominated at the 2nd Annual Visual Effects Society Awards (VES) for "Outstanding Supporting Visual Effects in a Motion Picture".

At the 2003 Stinkers Bad Movie Awards, the film won the award for Worst Sequel. It was also nominated for Most Intrusive Musical Score, but lost to Charlie's Angels: Full Throttle.

=== Megan Fox's cameo ===
In retrospect there has been criticism of director Michael Bay for the then-15-year-old Megan Fox in a scene at a strip club as a dancer, covered in water and portrayed suggestively. Megan Fox criticized Bay for this in an interview: "At 15! I was in 10th grade. That's kind of a microcosm of how Bay's mind works". Later on this caught some media attention and criticism.

Later on, Fox commented on the situation "when it comes to my direct experiences with Michael, and Steven (Spielberg) for that matter, I was never assaulted or preyed upon in what I felt was a sexual manner. I'm thankful to all of you who are brave enough to speak out and I'm grateful to all of you who are taking it upon yourselves to support, uplift, and bring comfort to those who have been harmed by a violent and toxic societal paradigm."

== In other media ==
=== Video game ===
A video game version of the film, known as Bad Boys: Miami Takedown in North America, was released in 2004 on the PlayStation 2, Xbox, GameCube and Windows. Originally planned for release in late 2003 (to tie in with the film's DVD release), the game was delayed by several months. The game failed to deliver any sort of sales or critical acclaim due to poor development; it was given low ratings from many game websites.

== Sequel ==
In June 2008, Michael Bay stated that he may direct Bad Boys III, but that the greatest obstacle to the potential sequel would be the cost, as he and Will Smith demand some of the highest salaries in the film industry. By August 2009, Columbia Pictures had hired Peter Craig to write the script for Bad Boys III. In February 2011, Martin Lawrence reiterated that the film was in development. In June 2014, Bruckheimer announced that screenwriter David Guggenheim was working on the storyline for the sequel. Two months later, Lawrence said a script had been written and parts had been cast. By June 2015, director Joe Carnahan was in early talks to write and possibly direct the film. Two months later, Sony Pictures Entertainment announced that Bad Boys III would be released on February 17, 2017, and that additional sequel, Bad Boys IV, is scheduled for release on July 3, 2019. On March 5, 2016, the film was pushed to June 2, 2017. Producers planned to begin production in early 2017. On August 11, 2016, the film was pushed back once again to January 12, 2018, to avoid box office competition with the upcoming DC Comics film Wonder Woman, and retitled Bad Boys for Life. Lawrence revealed on Jimmy Kimmel Live! that filming may start in March 2017. On February 6, 2017, it was announced that the film's release date has been delayed for the third time, to November 9, 2018. On March 7, 2017, Carnahan left the movie due to scheduling conflicts. In August 2017, Sony removed the third film from their release schedule and later in the month Lawrence said the film would not be happening.

In February 2018, it was reported that a sequel film was again being planned and will be directed by Belgian directors Adil El Arbi and Bilall Fallah, after development on Beverly Hills Cop: Axel F stalled, with Martin Lawrence and Will Smith reprising their roles. Joe Pantoliano also reprised his role as Captain Howard. Filming began in January 2019.

== Television series ==
In October 2017, a spin-off television series centered on Gabrielle Union's character, was announced to be in development by Brandon Margolis and Brandon Sonnier. Later that month NBC ordered the pilot episode of the series. By March 2018, Jessica Alba was cast as the co-star with Gabrielle Union. In addition to Union, John Salley will also reprise his role as Fletcher, a computer hacker who helps Mike and Marcus in the film series. The following month, the title of the series was revealed as LA's Finest, with Jerry Bruckheimer serving as executive producer for the series. Later that month, NBC passed on the pilot, and the show was shopped around to other networks. NBC's boss, Bob Greenblatt, said: “These are all tough calls. We did have an embarrassment of riches. And when we laid out the schedule and the calendar all season...it was a show that didn’t fit in the grand scheme of it.”

That same month, it was revealed that Sony Pictures Television, was negotiating with Charter Communications about picking up the series. By June 2018, Canada's Bell Media picked it up for 13 episodes. Charter gave its series order on June 26, intent on making it Spectrum's first original series.

== Home media ==
Bad Boys II was released on VHS and DVD on December 9, 2003, by Columbia-TriStar Home Entertainment. A Blu-ray release followed on November 10, 2015. Bad Boys II was included in a two film collection that includes the first film which was released on Ultra HD Blu-ray on September 4, 2018.

== See also ==
- Bad Boys (franchise)
- Police Story (1985) - inspired the very similar shanty town chase sequence in the film
