= Freeway discography =

This is the discography of rapper Freeway.

== Albums ==
=== Studio albums ===
Year	Album	Chart positions			Sales	Certifications
Year	Album	U.S.	U.S. R&B	U.S. Ind.	Sales	Certifications
2003	Philadelphia Freeway: Released: February 25, 2003; Label: Roc-A-Fella, Def Jam	5	3	—	US: 518,000	RIAA: Gold
2007	Free at Last: Released: November 20, 2007; Label: Roc-A-Fella, Def Jam	42	5	—	US: 113,000	
2009	Philadelphia Freeway 2: Released: May 19, 2009; Label: Real Talk	99	19	14		
2012	Diamond in the Ruff: Released: November 27, 2012; Label: Babygrande	—	40	41		
2016	Free Will: Released: April 29, 2016; Label: Babygrande	—	—	—		
2018	Think Free: Released: June 22, 2018; Label: New Rothchilds, Roc Nation	—	—	—		

=== Collaborative albums ===
Year	Album	Chart positions			Sales
Year	Album	U.S.	U.S. R&B	U.S. Ind.	Sales
2002	State Property OST (with State Property): Released: January 29, 2002; Label: Roc-A-Fella, Def Jam	14	1	—	
2003	The Chain Gang Vol. 2 (with State Property): Released: August 12, 2003; Label: Roc-A-Fella, Def Jam	6	1	—	US: 296,000
2010	The Stimulus Package (with Jake One): Released: February 16, 2010; Label: Rhymesayers	63	19	5	
2010	The Roc Boys (with Beanie Sigel): Released: March 9, 2010; Label: Siccness.net	—	53	—	
2013	Highway Robbery (with The Jacka): Released: September 16, 2014; Label: Team Early Ent, The Artist Records	—	—	—	
2024	The Stimulus Package 2 (with Jake One): Released: July 19, 2024; Label: White Van Music, Freedom Thinkers Academy, Venice Music	—	—	—	
2025	365 (with Damon Dash & The Black Guns): Released: June 21, 2025; Label: BluRoc Records	—	—	—	

=== Mixtapes ===
==== LPs ====
- 2002: The Hits, the Unreleased & Freestyles
- 2005: Heavyweight Flow
- 2006: G-Unit Radio 19
- 2007: Live Free, Die Hard (Hosted by Don Cannon)
- 2008: Freeway Is Back (Hosted By DJ Woogie & DJ Ian)
- 2009: Month of Madness
- 2009: The Calm Before The Storm
- 2009: The Beat Made Me Do It (Hosted by Don Cannon, Produced by Jake One)
- 2010: Freelapse
- 2011: The Intermission (Hosted By Superstar Jay & DJ Love Dinero)
- 2012: Freedom of Speech (Hosted by Team Early & Karmaloop)
- 2013: Write My Wrongs (with The Jacka)
- 2015: Freemix (with Scholito)
- 2016: Fear of a Free Planet

==== EPs ====
- 2011: StatikFree (with Statik Selektah)
- 2012: Black Santa
- 2014: Broken Ankles (with Girl Talk)
- 2018: The Black Gang EP (with Kid Kold)

==== Bootlegs ====
- 2009: The Month of Madness
- 2009: Streetz Is Mine
- 2010: This Is My Life

== Singles ==
=== Solo ===
Year	Song	Chart positions			Album
Year	Song	U.S. Hot 100	U.S. R&B	U.S. Rap	Album
2002	"Line 'Em Up" (feat. Young Chris)	—	86	—	Philadelphia Freeway
2002	"What We Do" (feat. Jay-Z & Beanie Sigel)	97	47	—	Philadelphia Freeway
2003	"Alright" (feat. Allen Anthony)	—	64	—	Philadelphia Freeway
2003	"Flipside" (feat. Peedi Crakk)	95	40	—	Philadelphia Freeway / Bad Boys II (soundtrack)
2005	"Where U Been"	—	99	—	Non-album single
2007	"Roc-A-Fella Billionaires" (feat. Jay-Z)	—	63	—	Free at Last
2007	"Lights Get Low" (feat. Rick Ross & Dre)	—	—	—	Free at Last
2009	"Finally Free"	—	—	—	Philadelphia Freeway 2
2011	"Beautiful Music"	—	—	—	Diamond in the Ruff
2011	"Escalators"	—	—	—	Diamond in the Ruff
2012	"Jungle"	—	—	—	Diamond in the Ruff

=== Collaboration ===
Year	Song	Chart positions			Album
Year	Song	U.S. Hot 100	U.S. R&B	U.S. Rap	Album
2002	"Roc the Mic" (with State Property)	55	16	6	State Property OST
2010	"Know What I Mean" (with Jake One)	—	—	—	The Stimulus Package
2010	"She Makes Me Feel Alright"(with Jake One)	—	—	—	The Stimulus Package

== Guest appearances ==
=== 2000–05 ===
==== 2000 ====
- "1-900-Hustler" (Jay-Z featuring Beanie Sigel, Memphis Bleek & Freeway)

==== 2001 ====
- "Coming for You" (DJ Clue? featuring Beanie Sigel & Freeway)
- "Think It's a Game" (Beanie Sigel featuring Freeway, Jay-Z & Young Chris)
- "Hate Blood" (Jermaine Dupri featuring Jadakiss & Freeway)

==== 2002 ====
- "Fantasy Real" [with Frankie]; "One for Peedi Crack" [with the namesake, Young Chris & Beanie Sigel]; "Roc Army" [with Jay-Z, Cam'ron, Peedi Crack, Oschino & Sparks]
- "Roc the Mic (Remix)" [Nelly featuring Roc Fam & Murphy Lee]
- "8 Miles and Running" [with Jay-Z]
- "You Got Me" (Mariah Carey featuring Jay-Z & Freeway)
- "As One" (Jay-Z featuring Beanie Sigel, Memphis Bleek, Freeway, Young Gunz, Peedi Crakk, Sparks & Rell)

==== 2003 ====
- "My Love" (The Diplomats featuring Freeway)
- "Here Comes the Fuzz" (Mark Ronson featuring Jack White, Freeway & Nikka Costa)
- "Leave Her Alone" (Nate Dogg featuring Memphis Bleek, Young Chris & Freeway)
- "Just Blaze, Bleek & Free" (Memphis Bleek featuring Freeway)
- "Let's Go" (Just Blaze featuring Freeway & Memphis Bleek)
- "Ride Up" (Kendrick Lamar featuring Freeway & Joe Budden) {mixtape shit}

==== 2004 ====
- ""Two Words" (Kanye West featuring Mos Def, Freeway & The Boys Choir of Harlem)
- Parade" (Young Gunz featuring Freeway)
- "Art & Life (Chi-Roc)" (Twista featuring Memphis Bleek, Young Chris & Freeway)
- "U Nomsayin" (The Beatnuts featuring Freeway)
- "Run (Remix)" (Ghostface Killah featuring Jadakiss, Lil Wayne, Raekwon & Freeway

==== 2005 ====
- "I Can't Go On This Way (Beanie Sigel featuring Freeway & Young Chris)
- "State to State" (Paul Wall featuring Freeway)
- "Fallen" (Keshia Chanté featuring Freeway)
- "Get Your Grind On" (Notorious B.I.G. featuring Big Pun, Fat Joe & Freeway)

=== 2006–10 ===
==== 2006 ====
- "What You Want" (LL Cool J featuring Freeway)
- "Where You At?" (DJ Khaled featuring Freeway & Clipse)
- "Soñando" (Polaco featuring Freeway)
- "Liberty Bell" (DJ Clue? featuring Beanie Sigel, Freeway & Cassidy)
- "Fast Forward" (Jody Breeze featuring Freeway)

==== 2007 ====
- "Criminal Opera" (Rick Ross featuring Freeway & Dre)
- "On the Grind" (Paul Wall featuring Freeway & Crys Wall)
- "Minnie Minnie" (Turf Talk featuring Freeway)
- "Cannon RMX" (DJ Drama featuring Lil Wayne, Willie the Kid, Freeway & T.I.)
- "That Filling" (Hezekiah featuring Freeway)

==== 2008 ====
- "Leave Her Alone" (Nate Dogg featuring Memphis Bleek, Freeway & Young Chris)
- "Don't Act Like You Don't Know" (Skillz featuring Freeway)
- "Drugs Crime Gorillaz" (Termanology featuring Freeway & Sheek Louch)
- "All 2gether Now" (Statik Selektah featuring Freeway, Peedi Crakk & Young Chris)
- "The Truth" (Jake One featuring Freeway & Brother Ali)
- "How We Ride" (Jake One featuring Freeway)

==== 2009 ====
- 2011: "Say It" (Termanology featuring Sheek Louch, Joell Ortiz, Bun B, Freeway & Saigon)
- 2009: "They Don't Know" (The Jacka featuring Freeway)
- 2009: "DoDo (Remix) (Snoop Dogg featuring Beanie Sigel, Freeway, Soopafly, E-White, Kokane & Jellyroll)
- 2009: "Project Leaders" (Trife Diesel featuring Freeway & Termanology)
- 2009: "Best @it" (Brother Ali featuring Freeway & Joell Ortiz)
- 2009: "Where's My Opponent" (Beanie Sigel featuring Omilio Sparks & Freeway)
- 2009: "Ready for War" (Beanie Sigel featuring Freeway & Young Chris)
- 2009: "Sicker Than Your Average" (Beanie Sigel featuring Freeway)
- 2009: "Move Back/The Reason" (Sha Stimuli featuring Freeway & Young chris)

==== 2010 ====
- 2010: "Night People" (Statik Selektah featuring Freeway, Red Cafe & Masspike Miles)
- 2010: "Pistolvania" (Vinnie Paz featuring Freeway & Jakk Frost)
- 2010: "Anything 2 Survive" (Freddie Gibbs featuring Freeway, Sly Polaroid & Adrian)
- 2010: "Dreams" (Outlawz featuring Freeway)
- 2010: "Cyphr" (Wale featuring Young Chris, Freeway & Beanie Sigel)
- 2010: "Life Is What You Make It" (1982 featuring Saigon & Freeway)

=== 2010–15 ===
==== 2011 ====
- 2011: "U Know" (Reks featuring Freeway)
- 2011: "You Take Her" (Termanology featuring Freeway & Havoc)
- 2011: "Victorious People" (Zion I & The Grouch featuring Freeway & the R.O.D. Project)
- 2011: "Roses" (Tek & Steele featuring Freeway)
- 2011: "Forfeit" (Ro Spit featuring Freeway)
- 2011: "Lay Low" (DJ Drama featuring Young Chris, Meek Mill & Freeway)

==== 2012 ====
- 2012: "Lights Off" (Trae featuring Rod C, Jay'Ton & Freeway)
- 2012: "Charlie Sheen" (Blanco & Nipsey Hussle featuring Freeway & Lil Rue)
- 2012: "Heard About It" (Ground Up featuring Freeway)
- 2012: "Highs & Lows (remix)" (¡Mayday! featuring Freeway & J.Nics)
- 2012: "Lord Knows" (Jarren Benton featuring Freeway & Planet IV)
- 2012: "Sucka MC's" (Slaughterhouse featuring Freeway) On the House
- 2012: "Deal With It" (Boaz featuring Freeway) Bases Loaded
- 2012: "Fresh" (Lee Mazin featuring Freeway) LoveLEE
- 2012: "Danger" (Journalist 103 featuring Freeway) Reporting Live
- 2012: "From the Streets" (Termanology and Lil' Fame featuring Freeway) Fizzyology

==== 2013 ====
- 2013: "Change Coming" (Chill Moody featuring Freeway) RFM
- 2013: "Family All Over" (Louie V Gutta featuring Freeway) Worth The Wait
- 2013: "Walk In" (Lee Mazin featuring Freeway) In My Own Lane
- 2013: "Didn't Know" (Roc Marciano featuring Freeway) Marci Beaucoup
- 2013: "Slave of Allah" (Yusuf Abdul-Mateen featuring Freeway) Rhyme Dawah
- 2013: "Nasze 5 Minut" (Grand Reserve featuring Freeway & JWP)

==== 2015 ====
- 2015: "Memories" (DJ Kay Slay featuring Freeway, Young Buck and Lil' Fame) The Industry Purge
- 2015: "M.G.D." (E.G.O. featuring Freeway and Montega) Maximum Pressure

=== 2016–20 ===
==== 2016 ====
- 2016: "Strawberry Mansion" (Lushlife & CSLSX featuring Freeway) Ritualize
- 2016: "King Jack" (Philthy Rich featuring Freeway & Paul Wall) Real Niggas Back in Style
- 2016 : "Fucc Em" (Nipsey Hussle featuring Freeway & Cuzzy Capone) "Famous Lies And Unpopular Truths EP"

==== 2017 ====
- 2017: "Wise Guys" (Kool G Rap featuring Lil Fame & Freeway) Return of the Don
- 2017: "Prisoner" (Sean Price featuring Freeway) Imperius Rex

==== 2018 ====
- 2018: "Amanda" (Kid Kold featuring Ghostface Killah & Freeway, produced by DJ Mercilless) The Block Gang

==== 2020 ====
- 2020: “Oh La Aye” (San Quinn featuring Freeway, produced by Monk Hits)
- 2020: "Bills Ain't Bossing You (I.T.C.H.)" (One Be Lo featuring Freeway, produced by Eric G)

==== 2023 ====
- 2023: "Ghetto to Meadow" (Oddisee featuring Freeway|\|produced by Oddisee)

===== 2024 =====
- "Rocafella Chain" (Grafh, .38 Spesh featuring Rocafam)

== Other songs ==
- 2005: "Where U Been" (feat. DMX)
- 2007: "Still Got Love"
- 2007: "It's Over"
- 2007: "Step Back" (feat. Lil Wayne)
- 2008: "How We Ride" (guest on White Van Music by Jake One)
- 2008: "The Truth" (feat. Brother Ali; guest on White Van Music by Jake One)
- 2008: "Reparations" (feat. Lloyd Banks)
- 2009: "When I Die" (feat. James Blunt)
- 2009: "Rap Money" (feat. Thee Tom Hardy & Young Chris)
- 2010: "We International" (feat. Drew Deezy, Thai & Izreal)
- 2010: "Kush Dreams" (feat. Outlawz for Killuminati 2K10)
