= Beanie Sigel discography =

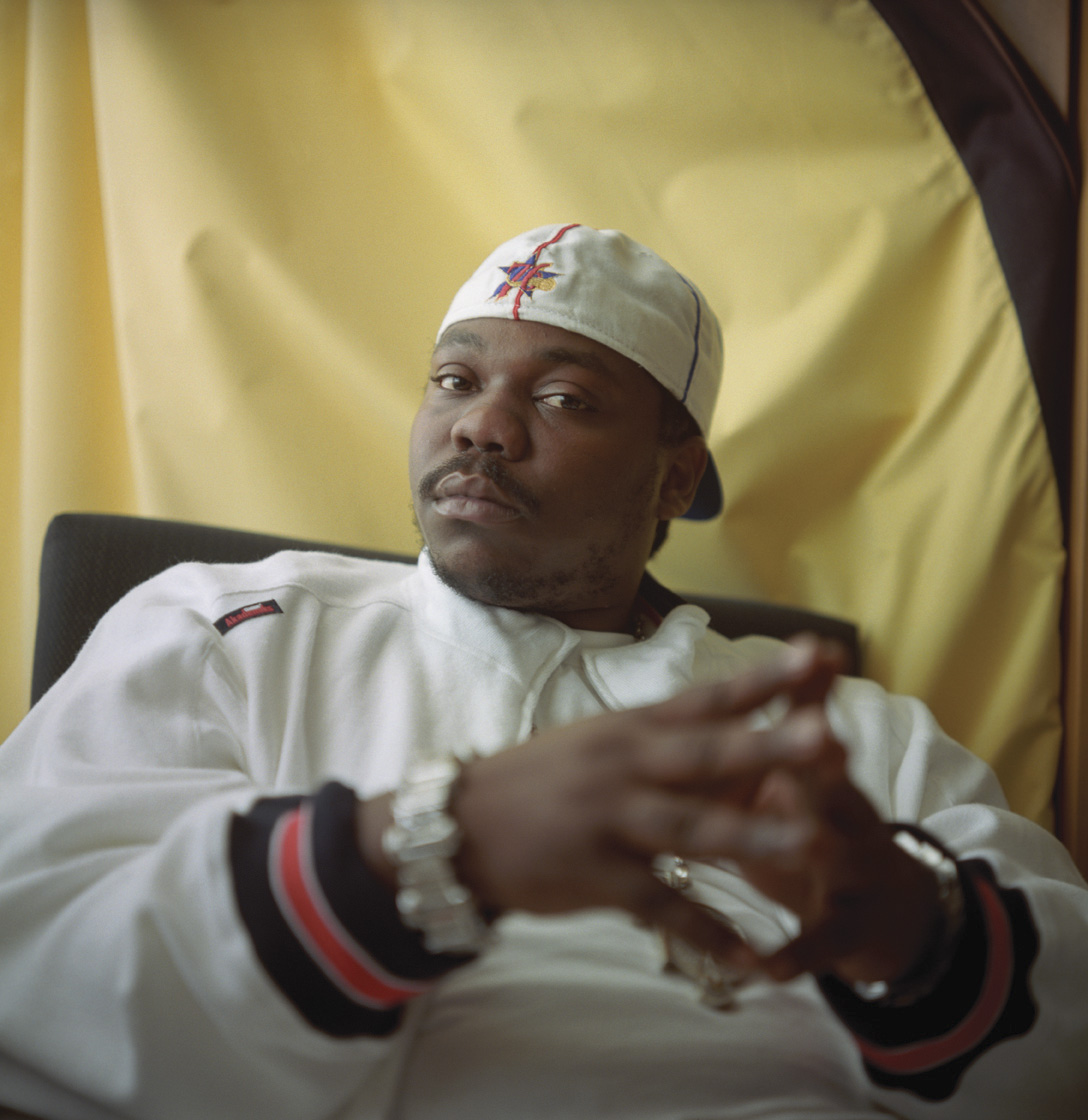
- Beanie Sigel in 2002
- Studio albums: 6
- Collaborative albums: 3
- Mixtapes: 6

This is the discography of Beanie Sigel, an American rapper.

== Albums ==
=== Studio albums ===
List of studio albums, with selected chart positions, sales figures and certifications
Title	Album details	Peak chart positions			Sales	Certifications
Title	Album details	US	US R&B	US Rap	Sales	Certifications
The Truth	Released: February 29, 2000; Label: Roc-A-Fella, Def Jam; Formats: CD, LP, cassette, digital download	5	2	–	US: 695,000	RIAA: Gold
The Reason	Released: June 26, 2001; Label: Roc-A-Fella, Def Jam; Formats: CD, LP, cassette, digital download	5	2	–	US: 585,000	
The B. Coming	Released: March 29, 2005; Label: Dame Dash Music Group, Def Jam; Formats: CD, LP, cassette, digital download	3	1	1	US: 435,000	
The Solution	Released: December 11, 2007; Label: Roc-A-Fella, Def Jam; Formats: CD, LP, digital download	37	7	3	US: 346,000	
The Broad Street Bully	Released: September 1, 2009; Label: Sicness; Formats: CD, LP, digital download	80	13	5	US: 66,500 (First Week)	
This Time	Released: August 28, 2012; Label: Ruffhouse, EMI; Formats: CD, digital download	185	33	29		
"—" denotes a recording that did not chart or was not released in that territory.

=== Collaborative album ===
Year	Album	Chart positions		
Year	Album	U.S.	U.S. R&B	U.S. Rap
2010	The Roc Boys (with Freeway): Released: March 9, 2010; Label: Sicness Records	158	53	23

== Mixtapes ==
- Public Enemy Number 1 (2004)
- Still Public Enemy Number 1 (2006)
- The Bully Is Back (2009)
- The Bully Is Back 2 (2009)
- The Official Beanie Sigel Mixtape (2009)
- Broad Street Empire Vol. 1: Lost Files (2012)

== Singles ==
=== As lead artist ===
List of singles as a lead artist, with selected chart positions, showing year released and album name
Title	Year	Peak chart positions				Album
Title	Year	US	US R&B	US Rap	US Rhyth.	Album
"The Truth"	2000	—	81	23	—	The Truth
"Remember Them Days" (featuring Eve)	2000	—	69	33	—	The Truth
"In the Club"	2000	—	—	—	—	Backstage: Music Inspired by the Film
"Beanie (Mack Bitch)"	2001	—	52	11	—	The Reason
"Think It's a Game" (featuring Freeway, Jay-Z and Young Chris)	2001	—	99	—	—	The Reason
"Roc the Mic" (with Freeway)	2002	55	16	6	30	State Property (soundtrack)
"When You Hear That" (featuring Peedi Crakk and Dirt McGirt)	2003	—	95	—	—	The Chain Gang Vol. 2
"Wanted (On the Run)" (featuring Cam'ron)	2004	—	— (Note: "Wanted (On the Run)" did not enter the Hot R&B/Hip-Hop Songs chart, but peaked at number 23 on the Hot R&B/Hip-Hop Singles Sales chart.)	—	—	The B. Coming
"Gotta Have It" (featuring Peedi Crakk and Twista)	2004	—	82	—	—	The B. Coming
"Don't Stop" (featuring Snoop Dogg)	2005	—	67	—	—	The B. Coming
"Feel It in the Air" (featuring Melissa Jiménez)	2005	—	55	—	—	The B. Coming
"All the Above" (featuring R. Kelly)	2007	—	83	—	—	The Solution
"Ready for War" (featuring Freeway and Young Chris)	2009	—	—	—	—	The Broad Street Bully
"I Go Off" (featuring 50 Cent)	2009	—	—	—	—	Non-album single
"—" denotes a recording that did not chart.

=== As featured artist ===
List of singles as a featured artist, with selected chart positions, showing year released and album name
Title	Year	Peak chart positions								Album
Title	Year	US	US R&B	US Rap	AUS	FRA	NLD	SWI	UK	Album
"More Money, More Cash, More Hoes" (Remix) (Jay-Z featuring Memphis Bleek and Beanie Sigel)	1999	—	—	—	—	—	—	—	—	The Corruptor (soundtrack)
"Do It Again (Put Ya Hands Up)" (Jay-Z featuring Amil and Beanie Sigel)	1999	65	17	9	—	—	—	—	—	Vol. 3... Life and Times of S. Carter
"4 da Fam" (Amil featuring Jay-Z, Memphis Bleek and Beanie Sigel)	2000	—	99	29	—	—	—	—	—	All Money Is Legal
"Unleash the Dragon" (Sisqó featuring Beanie Sigel)	2000	—	—	—	18	41	30	47	6	Unleash the Dragon
"Change the Game" (Jay-Z featuring Beanie Sigel and Memphis Bleek)	2001	86	29	10	—	—	—	—	—	The Dynasty: Roc La Familia
"Ride Out" (Mil featuring B.G., Lil Wayne and Beanie Sigel)	2001	—	—	—	—	—	—	—	—	Street Scriptures
"Dance with Me (Remix)" (112 featuring Beanie Sigel)	2002	—	—	—	—	—	—	—	—	Non-album single
"Guess Who's Back" (Scarface featuring Jay-Z and Beanie Sigel)	2002	78	22	10	—	—	—	—	—	The Fix
"One for Peedi Crakk" (Peedi Crakk featuring Beanie Sigel, Freeway and Young Chris)	2002	—	— (Note: "One for Peedi Crakk" did not enter the Hot R&B/Hip-Hop Songs chart, but peaked at number 33 on the Hot R&B/Hip-Hop Singles Sales chart.)	—	—	—	—	—	—	Paid In Full (soundtrack) / Dream Team
"What We Do" (Freeway featuring Jay-Z and Beanie Sigel)	2002	97	47	—	—	—	—	—	—	Philadelphia Freeway
"So Much Trouble" (D-Block featuring Beanie Sigel)	2009	—	—	—	—	—	—	—	—	No Security
"—" denotes a recording that did not chart or was not released in that territory.

=== Promotional singles ===
List of promotional singles, showing year released and album name
Title	Year	Album
"2 Glock 9's" (T.I.P. featuring Beanie Sigel)	2000	Shaft (soundtrack)

== Other charted songs ==
List of other charted songs, with selected chart positions, showing year released and album name
Title	Year	Peak chart positions	Album
Title	Year	US R&B	Album
"Parking Lot Pimpin'" (Jay-Z featuring Beanie Sigel and Memphis Bleek)	2000	— (Note: "Parking Lot Pimpin'" did not enter the Hot R&B/Hip-Hop Songs chart, but peaked at number 13 on the Bubbling Under R&B/Hip-Hop Singles chart.)	The Dynasty: Roc La Familia
"The ROC (Just Fire)" (Cam'ron featuring Beanie Sigel and Memphis Bleek)	2002	77	Come Home with Me
"Champions" (with Dame Dash, Kanye West, Cam'ron, Young Chris and Twista)	2002	— (Note: "Champions" did not enter the Hot R&B/Hip-Hop Songs chart, but peaked at number nine on the Bubbling Under R&B/Hip-Hop Singles chart.)	Paid In Full/Dream Team
"—" denotes a recording that did not chart.

== Guest appearances ==
List of non-single guest appearances, with other performing artists, showing year released and album name
Title	Year	Other artist(s)	Album
"Reservoir Dogs"	1998	Jay-Z, The Lox, Sauce Money	Vol. 2... Hard Knock Life
"Crew Love"	1998	Jay-Z, Memphis Bleek	Belly (soundtrack)
"Adrenaline!"	1999	The Roots, Dice Raw	Things Fall Apart
"4-5-6"	1999	Foxy Brown, Memphis Bleek	Chyna Doll
"I Got What You On"	1999	Blackstreet	Finally
"The Hood"	1999	Ruff Ryders, Infa-Red, NuChild, Mysonne, Drag-On	Ryde or Die Vol. 1
"Journey Through the Life"	1999	Puff Daddy, Lil Kim, Joe Hooker, Nas	Forever
"Peep the Steelo"	1999	—N/a	North East West South
"Philly Philly"	1999	Eve	Let There Be Eve...Ruff Ryders' First Lady
"My Hood to Your Hood"	1999	Memphis Bleek	Coming of Age
"Caught Up"	1999	Gina Thompson	If You Only Knew
"That's Real"	1999	AZ	Light It Up (soundtrack) / 9 Lives
"If I Should Die Before I Wake"	1999	The Notorious B.I.G., Black Rob, Ice Cube	Born Again
"For My Thugs"	1999	Funkmaster Flex & Big Kap, Jay-Z, Memphis Bleek, Amil	The Tunnel
"Dead Man Walking"	1999	Funkmaster Flex & Big Kap, Dutch, Spade	The Tunnel
"Pop 4 Roc"	1999	Jay-Z, Memphis Bleek, Amil	Vol. 3... Life and Times of S. Carter
"What U Want"	2000	Next	Welcome II Nextasy
"There's Nothing Better"	2000	Memphis Bleek	Bait (soundtrack)
"Streets Is Talking"	2000	Jay-Z	The Dynasty: Roc La Familia
"This Can't Be Life"	2000	Jay-Z, Scarface	The Dynasty: Roc La Familia
"Stick 2 the Script"	2000	Jay-Z, DJ Clue?	The Dynasty: Roc La Familia
"You, Me, Him and Her"	2000	Jay-Z, Memphis Bleek, Amil	The Dynasty: Roc La Familia
"Parking Lot Pimpin'"	2000	Jay-Z, Memphis Bleek, Lil Mo	The Dynasty: Roc La Familia
"1-900-Hustler"	2000	Jay-Z, Memphis Bleek, Freeway	The Dynasty: Roc La Familia
"The R.O.C."	2000	Memphis Bleek	The Dynasty: Roc La Familia
"Where Have You Been"	2000	Jay-Z, L. Dionne	The Dynasty: Roc La Familia
"Get That Dough"	2000	—N/a	Lyricist Lounge 2
"Change Up"	2000	Memphis Bleek, Jay-Z	The Understanding
"My Mind Right" (Remix)	2000	Memphis Bleek, Jay-Z, H Money Bags	The Understanding
"Hustlers"	2000	Memphis Bleek	The Understanding
"Coming for You"	2001	DJ Clue?, Freeway	The Professional 2
"Change the Game" (Remix)	2001	DJ Clue?, Jay-Z, Tha Dogg Pound, Memphis Bleek	The Professional 2
"3 Minutes"	2001	Mil	Street Scriptures
"Suckas Pt. 2"	2001	Philly's Most Wanted	Get Down or Lay Down
"Live From the Streets"	2001	Angie Martinez, Jadakiss, Styles P, Brett, Kool G Rap	Up Close and Personal
"Best Run"	2001	Tha Dogg Pound, Roscoe	Dillinger & Young Gotti
"Green Light"	2002	Jay-Z & R. Kelly	The Best of Both Worlds
"The ROC (Just Fire)"	2002	Cam'ron, Memphis Bleek	Come Home with Me
"Roc the Mic" (Remix)	2002	Nelly, Freeway, Memphis Bleek, Murphy Lee	Nellyville
"Champions"	2002	Dame Dash, Kanye West, Cam'ron, Young Chris, Twista	Paid in Full (soundtrack)
"Home of Philly"	2002	Young Chris	Paid in Full (soundtrack)
"Fuck for Free"	2002	8Ball, Carmen Sandiego	Lay It Down
"Some How Some Way"	2002	Jay-Z, Scarface	The Blueprint 2: The Gift & The Curse
"As One"	2002	Jay-Z, Memphis Bleek, Freeway, Young Gunz, Peedi Crakk, Omillio Sparks, Rell	The Blueprint 2: The Gift & The Curse
"Life"	2003	Freeway	Philadelphia Freeway
"Hypnotic"	2003	Memphis Bleek, Jay-Z	M.A.D.E.
"Murda, Murda"		Memphis Bleek, Jay-Z	M.A.D.E.
"Roc U"	2004	Young Gunz	Tough Luv
"Kiss Your Ass Goodbye" (Remix)	2005	Sheek Louch, Fabolous, T.I.	After Taxes
"Never Snitch"	2006	Scarface, The Game	My Homies Part 2
"Problem"	2006	DJ Khaled, Jadakiss	Listennn... the Album
"Better Way"	2006	Ray Cash	Cash on Delivery
"Do Your Time"	2006	Ludacris, Pimp C, C-Murder	Release Therapy
"Purple"	2006	Project Pat	Crook by da Book: The Fed Story
"Liberty Bell"	2006	DJ Clue, Freeway, Cassidy	The Professional 3
"Before the Solution"	2007	DJ Khaled, Poo Bear	We the Best
"Ignorant Shit"	2007	Jay-Z	American Gangster
"Original Gangstas"	2007	Young Chris, Freeway, M.O.P., Peedi Crakk, Neef Buck, Pooda Brown	Hired Gun
"U Ain't Ready 4 Me"	2007	Styles P	Super Gangster (Extraordinary Gentleman)
"Tony Sigel A.K.A. the Barrel Brothers"	2007	Ghostface Killah, Styles P, Solomon Childs	The Big Doe Rehab
"Rush"	2008	Young Chris	Campaign for Change
"Goon Music"	2009	French Montana, Max B, Scarlett & Mac Mustard	Mac & Cheese
"All This Gwop"	2009	French Montana, Max B, Scarlett & Mac Mustard	Mac & Cheese
"Perfectionist"	2009	Asher Roth, Rock City	Asleep in the Bread Aisle
"Free Peedi"	2009	Don Cannon & Young Chris, Tu Phace	The Network
"Last 2"	2009	Don Cannon & Young Chris, Freeway	The Network
"So Much Trouble"	2009	Sheek Louch, Styles P, Bucky	No Security
"Have Mercy"	2009	Raekwon, Blue Raspberry	Only Built 4 Cuban Linx... Pt. II
"Stimulus Intro"	2010	Freeway & Jake One	The Stimulus Package
"Silverback Mack"	2010	Sheek Louch	Donnie Def Jam
"Kill 'Em All"	2010	Vinnie Paz	Season of the Assassin
"Dreamchasers"	2011	Meek Mill	Dreamchasers
"Murder Outside"	2011	Young Chris	The Revival
"Just Chill"	2011	Travis Barker, Bun B, Kobe	Give the Drummer Some
"Heavy Artillery"	2011	Game, Rick Ross	The R.E.D. Album
"Microphone Murder"	2015	DJ Kay Slay, Freeway, Young Chris, Tracey Lee	Rhyme or Die
"I Lied"	2015	DJ Khaled, French Montana, Meek Mill, Jadakiss	I Changed A Lot
"Keep Dealing"	2015	Pusha T	King Push – Darkest Before Dawn: The Prelude
"OOOUUU (Remix)"	2016	Meek Mill, Omelly, Takbar	non-album single
"Have Mercy"	2016	French Montana, Jadakiss, Styles P	MC4
"Get Gangsta"	2016	OG Boobie Black, Kevin Gates	The Boobie Trapp 2
"The Real Is Back"	2016	Dave East	Kairi Chanel
"Real Money"	2019	DJ Paul	Power, Pleasure & Painful Things
"Lock Load"	2022	Conway the Machine	God Don't Make Mistakes
"Educate Yourself"	2024	Styles P	Vote or Else
