= Freedom of Speech (mixtape) =

Mixtape by Freeway
- Released: October 16, 2012
- Recorded: 2012
- Genre: Hip hop
- Producers: 183rd, AK47, B. Jones, Cardiak, CertiFYD, Jake One, Jeffro, JRB, Mike Jerz, Mr. Green, Sap, Thelonious Martin, Toure

Freeway chronology
The Stimulus Package (2010)	Freedom of Speech (2012)	Diamond In the Ruff (2012)

Singles from Freedom of Speech
- 1. "Master of Ceremony" Released: February 9, 2012; 2. "Let You Know" Released: May 24, 2012; 3. "Real Shit" Released: June 7, 2012; 4. "We Up" Released: August 7, 2012

Freedom of Speech is an official mixtape by American hip hop recording artist Freeway in conjunction with Rocksmith and KarmaLoop. It was released on October 16, 2012 as prelude to his long-awaited album, Diamond In the Ruff.

== Background ==
On February 10, 2012, Freeway has announced that he would release a mixtape consisting of 12 original tracks. For this project, he partnered with streetwear clothing line Rocksmith Tokyo and fashion retailer and culture outlet KarmaLoop, the latter of which also partnered with him to shoot videos for songs from the mixtape, including "Master Of Ceremony", "Let You Know", "We Up" and "Real Shit". For Freeway, the partnership was a natural decision, given his long-standing relationships with both companies. Tom Keough, Special Projects Coordinator for KarmaLoop, also expressed his excited to take part in the release of Freedom Of Speech: "It was an easy decision to partner Rocksmith and Freeway on this project for KarmaLoop Music. These are two brands that KarmaLoop stands behind and believes in. Free has always supported KarmaLoop so it was a no-brainer – he's part of the KarmaLoop fam."

The mixtape, hosted by record producer and DJ Don Cannon, was made available on October 16, 2012 for free download via KarmaLoop's music website and also on DatPiff. The 16-tracks project includes guest appearances from Jakk Frost, Malik B, Young Chris and Diamond among others, is scored by the likes of Jake One, Cardiak and Thelonious Martin, and is mixed by Mike Jerz, who also contributes production on "Master Of Ceremony".

== Track listing ==
No.	Title	Producer(s)	Length
1.	"F.O.S" (featuring Mama Jones)	B.Jones	3:50
2.	"Hotline"	183rd	4:01
3.	"Dinars"	AK47	3:54
4.	"Bearded Wonder"	Jeffro	3:33
5.	"Beards R' Us" (featuring Jakk Frost, Malik B and Tana Da Beast)	Mr. Green	4:25
6.	"Go Get It"	Cardiak	3:47
7.	"Seems Like"	Toure	3:25
8.	"Master Of Ceremony"	Mike Jerz	2:41
9.	"Ice Cream" (featuring Diamond)	B.Jones	3:51
10.	"Let You Know"	Thelonious Martin	2:59
11.	"Ghetto Love" (featuring Free)	Sap	3:15
12.	"We Up"	JRB	3:44
13.	"Real Shit" (featuring Young Chris)	CertiFYD	3:01
14.	"Nah Uh" (featuring M Class)	Jake One	4:20
15.	"Workout"	B.Jones	2:19
16.	"Hold You Down" (featuring Sean McGee)	B.Jones	4:45
