= Diamond in the Ruff =

Studio album by Freeway
- Released: November 27, 2012
- Recorded: 2011–12
- Genre: Hip hop
- Length: 57:40
- Label: Team Early; Babygrande
- Producer: Freeway (exec.); Chuck Wilson (exec.); Jake One; Incredible Stro; Mike Jerz; Bink!; Just Blaze; Needlz; Sunny Dukes; DJ Khalil

Freeway chronology
The Stimulus Package (2010)	Diamond in the Ruff (2012)	Free Will (2016)

Singles from Diamond in the Ruff
- 1. "Jungle" Released: October 12, 2012; 2. "Numbers" Released: November 13, 2012

Diamond in the Ruff is the fourth studio album by American hip hop recording artist Freeway, released worldwide by Babygrande Records on November 27, 2012.

== Conception ==
=== Background ===
As the ex-Roc-A-Fella artist signed one-album deal with Babygrande Records in July 2012, Diamond In the Ruff represents his first full-length project since 2010's critically acclaimed The Stimulus Package, a collaborative album with Seattleite producer Jake One. The album includes features from Wale, Marsha Ambrosius, Vivian Green, Suzann Christine, Nikki Jean, Miss Daja Thomas, Alonda Rich, and fellow Philadelphian artists Neef Buck and Musiq Soulchild. The production is handled by the likes of Jake One, Needlz, as well as Bink! and Just Blaze, who have both worked on his debut album. Gimel "Young Guru" Keaton, the sound engineer behind 10 of Jay-Z’s 11 albums, was slated to mix the entirety of the project. In 2010, Freeway told SLAM Magazine "the whole album is soulful and real. It's [him], and it's different than what everyone else is doing". In a video interview with KarmaLoop TV, he expressed that the album should have come after Philadelphia Freeway (2003).

=== Title significance ===
During an interview with Canada's The Come Up Show, Freeway provided some insight into the project's title. "I feel [that this is symbolic in relation] to my career. I'm a diamond in the rough. I'm still shining [despite] all the things [I experienced]. Life is [a daily] struggle. Even just being famous and maintaining, staying on top of your game. It takes a lot. And through all that [I have lived, I always shine], so we chose Diamond In the Ruff."

== Promotion ==
In anticipation of the album's release, a mixtape sponsored by KarmaLoop Music and Rocksmith clothing, entitled Freedom of Speech, was released on October 16, 2012. Freeway offered another mixtape entirely mixed by Statik Selektah on November 23, 2012. Entitled The History Of Freeway, it contains thirty-four pieces that were selected from the rapper's discography.

A tour was planned in support of the album; the first half began on October 12 in Atlanta and concluded on November 13 in New York.

=== Promotional singles ===
In 2010, two songs, produced by Jake One, were released under Rhymesayers Entertainment to promote the album, both of which have had videos made for them by Jimmy Giambrone. The first one was entitled "Beautiful Music". The single was made available on October 4, 2011, as digital download on iTunes. It was leaked on September 28, 2010, as an exclusive at Nahright.com and the music video premiered the same date at OnSMASH.com. The second song was "Escalators". It contains a vocal sample of The Notorious B.I.G.'s "You're Nobody (Til Somebody Kills You)" in the hook. The song and its accompanying music video premiered on October 19, 2010, at RapRadar.com and became available on iTunes on October 11, 2011.

=== Singles ===
The lead single, "Jungle", produced by Incredible Stro, premiered on October 12, 2012, at Babygrande Records' SoundCloud page and was made available on iTunes on October 15, 2012. Its music video, directed by Jimmy Giambrone, premiered on November 19, 2012, at the label's YouTube channel.

The second single is "Numbers", featuring longtime collaborator Neef Buck and produced by Sunny Dukes. It was premiered at the label's SoundCloud page on November 13, 2012.

== Critical reception ==
Professional ratings
Aggregate scores
Source	Rating
Metacritic	65/100
Review scores
Source	Rating
Allmusic	3/5 stars
AllHipHop	8/10
HipHopDX	4/5 stars
Pitchfork	5.3/10
PopMatters	5/10 medals
RapReviews	7.5/10
XXL	(XL)

Diamond In the Ruff was met with generally favorable reviews from music critics. At Metacritic, which assigns a normalized rating out of 100 to reviews from mainstream critics, the album received an average score of 65, based on 6 reviews. Jayson Greene of Pitchfork gave the album a 5.3 out of ten, saying "Freeway is still nowhere near close to sucking. But he's well on his way to not mattering." Jason Lymangrover of Allmusic gave the album three out of five stars, saying "Switching to a smaller label is generally not a sign of good fortune in the rap world, but Freeway continues to be interesting enough with his gruff, dexterous style of storytelling to make a solid impact as an underground artist." Eric Diep of XXL gave the album an XL, saying "For dedicated troupers of Philadelphia Freeway, there’s enough here to satisfy."

Pete T. of RapReviews gave the album a 7.5 out of 10, saying "There's far more good here than bad, but there's definitely a sense of familiarity to "His execution and consistency deserve nothing but the highest praise, and while I'm still awaiting the record where Freeway fulfills his massive potential, "Diamond in the Ruff" is a worthy addition to a catalog that includes a few of my very favorite records of the last decade." King Eljay of AllHipHop gave the album an eight out of ten, saying "Freeway’s been consistent, and he’s saved some of his best music of the year for Diamond In The Ruff. With great production from Jake One, Mike Jerz, and more, alongside the cameo appearances cited above, this is a dope play from start to finish."

== Track listing ==
No.	Title	Writer(s)	Producer(s)	Length
1.	"Right Back" (featuring Marsha Ambrosius)	Leslie Pridgen; Marsha Ambrosius; Jacob Dutton	Jake One	4:20
2.	"Greatness" (featuring Vivian Green)	Pridgen; Vivian Green; Stephen Tucker	Incredible Stro	4:14
3.	"The Thirst"	Pridgen; Dutton	Jake One	4:38
4.	"Wonder Tape" (featuring Suzann Christine)	Pridgen; Suzanne Christine; Adrian Charlie Guzman	Mike Jerz	3:48
5.	"No Doubt"	Pridgen; Guzman	Mike Jerz	2:30
6.	"Dream Big" (featuring Musiq Soulchild)	Pridgen; Taalib Johnson; Roosevelt Harrell III	Bink!	3:50
7.	"Early"	Pridgen; Justin Smith	Just Blaze	3:33
8.	"Ghetto Streets"	Pridgen; Khari Cain	Needlz	2:38
9.	"Numbers" (featuring Neef Buck)	Pridgen; Hanif Muhammad	Sunny Dukes	4:04
10.	"True" (featuring Wale)	Pridgen; Khalil Abdul-Rahman; Olubowale Akintimehin; Dutton	Jake One; DJ Khalil	3:51
11.	"Sweet Temptations" (featuring Nikki Jean)	Pridgen; Nicholle Leary; Guzman	Mike Jerz	3:23
12.	"All the Hoods" (featuring Miss Daja Thomas & Alonda Rich)	Pridgen; Daja Thomas; Alonda Rich; Harrell III	Bink!	4:06
13.	"Hottest Akhi"	Pridgen; Cain	Needlz	3:07
14.	"Jungle"	Pridgen; Tucker	Incredible Stro	2:54
15.	"Money Is My Medicine"	Pridgen; Guzman	Mike Jerz	3:12
16.	"Lil Mama"	Pridgen; Harrell III	Bink!	3:32
Total length:				57:40

== Personnel ==
Credits for Diamond In the Ruff adapted from Allmusic.

- Freeway — executive producer, primary artist
- Chuck Wilson — A&R, executive producer
- Chris Isidori — A&R
- Ruddy Rock — A&R
- Bob Macc — mastering
- Dragan "Chach" Cacinovic — mixing
- Rocklogic — mixing
- Colino Fresh — mixing
- Mike Jerz — mixing, producer
- Needlz — mixing, producer
- Incredible Stro — producer
- Bink! — producer
- Jake One — producer
- Just Blaze — producer
- Sunny Dukes — producer
- DJ Khalil — composer, producer
- Gregory Spearman — composer
- Hanif Muhammad — composer
- J. Dutton — composer
- Stephen Tucker — composer
- Alonda Rich — composer, featured artist
- Miss Daja Thomas — composer, featured artist
- Suzanne Christine — composer, featured artist
- Vivian Green — composer, featured artist
- Marsha Ambrosius — featured artist
- Musiq Soulchild — featured artist
- Neef Buck — featured artist
- Nikki Jean — featured artist
- Dion — vocals
- Alrenzo Albritton — instrumentation
- Ben Delfin — design
- Jeremy Gerson — product manager
- Oluwaseye Olusa — photography

== Charts ==
Chart (2012)	Peak position
US Independent Albums (Billboard)	41
US Top R&B/Hip-Hop Albums (Billboard)	40
