= Gotta Have It =

Gotta Have It may refer to:

- "Gotta Have It", the commercial campaign slogan of Pepsi in 1991-92
- "Gotta Have It", song by French singer Vanessa Paradis on her 1994 album Live
- "Karaoke Cafe: 'Gotta Have It'", 1994 episode of American claymation series Bump in the Night
- "Gotta Have It", 2004 solo single by American rapper Beanie Sigel
- Gotta Have It, 2004 romance novel by American author Lori Wilde
- "Gotta Have It" (Jay-Z and Kanye West song), 2011
- Gotta Have It (Kettama song), 2025

== See also ==
- She's Gotta Have It, a 1986 Spike Lee film
