= One for Peedi Crakk =

Single by Peedi Crakk featuring Freeway, Young Chris and Beanie Sigel

Single by Peedi Crakk featuring Freeway, Young Chris and Beanie Sigel

from the album Paid In Full/Dream Team
- Released: November 26, 2002
- Genre: Hip hop
- Length: 4:49
- Label: Roc-A-Fella, Def Jam
- Songwriters: Pedro Zayas; Leslie Pridgen; Christopher Ries; Dwight Grant
- Producer: Megahertz

Peedi Crakk singles chronology
"One for Peedi Crakk" (2002)	"Flipside" (2003)

Freeway singles chronology
"What We Do" (2002)	"One for Peedi Crakk" (2002)	"Alright" (2003)

Young Chris singles chronology
"One for Peedi Crakk" (2002)	"I'm Alive" (2013)

Beanie Sigel singles chronology
"What We Do" (2002)	"One for Peedi Crakk" (2002)	"Gotta Have It" (2004)

Music video
- "One for Peedi Crakk" on YouTube

"One for Peedi Crakk" is the debut single by American rapper Peedi Crakk, released in 2002. It features American rappers Freeway, Young Chris and Beanie Sigel, and was produced by Megahertz. The song is from the soundtrack to the 2002 film Paid in Full.

== Background ==
American rapper Cam'ron originally recorded a verse on the song. It was removed by Jay-Z, much to Peedi Crakk's disappointment. However, a remix of the song featuring Juelz Santana, Cam'ron and Beanie Sigel was later released.

The song became Peedi Crakk's first single to chart on the Billboard R&B/Hip-Hop top 40.

== Critical reception ==
Complex placed the song at number 50 on its "The 50 Best Philadelphia Rap Songs" list in 2012. Julian Kimble of Complex wrote, "he showed off that choppy flow and charisma that should've made him rich."

== Charts ==
Chart (2003)	Peak position
US Billboard Hot R&B/Hip-Hop Singles Sales	33
