= Champions (Paid in Full song) =

2002 song by several hip hop artists

Song by Damon Dash, Kanye West, Beanie Sigel, Cam'ron, Young Chris and Twista

from the album Paid In Full/Dream Team
- Released: November 26, 2002
- Recorded: 2002
- Genre: East Coast hip-hop; chipmunk soul
- Length: 6:12
- Label: Roc-A-Fella; Def Jam
- Songwriters: Dame Dash; Kanye West; Dwight Grant; Cameron Giles; Christopher Ries; Carl Mitchell
- Producers: Dash; West

"Champions" is a collaborative song by hip hop artists Damon Dash, Kanye West, Beanie Sigel, Cam'ron, Young Chris and Twista. It is listed as the first track on the second disc of the Paid in Full soundtrack. The song includes a sped-up sample of "We Are the Champions" by Queen. It was originally scheduled to be a bonus track on West's album The College Dropout (2004).

== Background and composition ==
On the original track listing of West's debut studio album The College Dropout (2004), "Champions" was listed as a bonus track. Dash introduces West's verse with the line: "I bet niggas didn't know you could rap huh?" because back in 2002, when the soundtrack album was released, West was only recognized for his talent as a producer and not viewed as a credible rapper. Throughout the entirety of the track, a sped up sample of highly famous 1977 Queen single "We Are the Champions" is used and the rappers state themselves as being of importance. Dash revealed that he asked West to flip the track's beat after Just Blaze wouldn't do so and West reacted quickly to this, which gathered the approval of Dash.

== Critical reception ==
Billboard viewed the track as being one of the Paid in Full soundtrack's highlights. Its presence on the soundtrack album was looked at by Jason Birchmeier of AllMusic as being one of "some promising ideas" and an example of where "some of the beats are on point". Jesse of HipHopDX voiced the opinion towards West being one of the lead artists on 2016 GOOD Music single "Champions" that: "It makes little sense for Kanye to title another song 'Champions,' especially one that can't live up to the Queen sampled Roc-A-Fella posse cut or track two on Graduation."

== Commercial performance ==
In March 2003, around four months after the soundtrack album had been released, the song peaked at number 6 on the US Billboard Bubbling Under R&B/Hip-Hop Singles chart and spent a total of nine weeks on it.

== Charts ==
Chart (2003)	Peak position
US Bubbling Under R&B/Hip-Hop Singles (Billboard)	9
