= My Block =

2002 single by Scarface

Single by Scarface

from the album The Fix
- B-side: "Guess Who's Back"
- Released: July 30, 2002
- Recorded: 2001
- Genre: Gangsta rap
- Length: 3:34
- Label: Def Jam South
- Songwriter: Brad Jordan
- Producers: Nashiem Myrick; Lee Stone

Scarface singles chronology
"Guess Who's Back" (2002)	"My Block" (2002)	"Swangin" (2013)

"My Block" is a song by American rapper Scarface and the second single released from his seventh studio album The Fix (2002).

The song samples the piano intro from the 1971 Roberta Flack and Donny Hathaway song "Be Real Black For Me".

"My Block" made it to 46 on the Billboard Hot R&B/Hip-Hop Songs.

The song was later interpolated by YBN Cordae and Chance the Rapper on the track "Bad Idea" on the album The Lost Boy.

== Music video ==
The music video for "My Block" was directed by Marc Klasfeld.

== Track listing ==
=== A-Side ===
1. "My Block" (Radio Edit)
2. "My Block" (Album Version)
3. "My Block" (Instrumental)

=== B-Side ===
1. "Guess Who's Back" (Radio Edit)
2. "Guess Who's Back" (Album Version)
3. "Guess Who's Back" (Instrumental)

== Charts ==
Chart	Position
US Hot R&B/Hip-Hop Songs (Billboard)	46
