= White Van Music =

Studio album by Jake One
- Released: October 7, 2008
- Recorded: 2006–2008
- Genre: Hip hop
- Length: 66:26
- Label: Rhymesayers Entertainment
- Producer: Jake One

Jake One chronology
White Van Music (2008)	The Stimulus Package (2010)

Singles from White Van Music
- 1. "The Truth" / "Trap Door" Released: November 7, 2008

White Van Music is the debut studio album by American hip hop producer Jake One. It was released on Rhymesayers Entertainment on October 7, 2008. It peaked at number 10 on the Billboard Heatseekers Albums chart, number 49 on the Independent Albums chart, and number 94 on the Top R&B/Hip-Hop Albums chart.

== Recording ==
Jake One started work on the album in 2006, and finished mixing in August of 2008. According to him, the album was titled after a song he had made for a friend titled "In My White Van".

"Glow" was originally supposed to solely feature Elzhi, but the files for the recording session were lost; the final version that appears on the album features both Elzhi and Royce da 5'9".

== Track listing ==
All music is composed by Jacob Dutton.

White Van Music track listing
No.	Title	Length
1.	"I'm Coming" (featuring Black Milk and Nottz)	3:07
2.	"Gangsta Boy" (featuring M.O.P.)	3:11
3.	"The Truth" (featuring Freeway and Brother Ali)	3:34
4.	"Turn It Down"	0:50
5.	"God Like" (featuring D. Black)	2:29
6.	"Bless the Child" (featuring Little Brother)	4:22
7.	"Oh Really" (featuring Posdnuos and Slug)	2:48
8.	"Hi"	0:48
9.	"Trap Door" (featuring MF Doom)	2:14
10.	"Dead Wrong" (featuring Young Buck)	3:36
11.	"Kissin' the Curb" (featuring Bishop Lamont and Busta Rhymes)	3:35
12.	"How We Ride" (featuring Freeway)	4:37
13.	"White Van" (featuring The Alchemist, Evidence, and Prodigy)	3:16
14.	"Big Homie Style" (featuring J. Pinder, GMK, and Spaceman)	4:24
15.	"Scared" (featuring Blueprint)	2:29
16.	"Great Sound"	1:03
17.	"Get 'Er Done" (featuring MF Doom)	2:24
18.	"Feelin' My Shit" (featuring Casual)	3:23
19.	"Soil Raps" (featuring Keak da Sneak)	4:07
20.	"Glow" (featuring Elzhi and Royce da 5'9")	3:08
21.	"R.I.P."	1:38
22.	"Home" (featuring Vitamin D, C Note, Maine, and Ish)	5:21
Total length:		66:26

Expanded edition bonus track
No.	Title	Length
23.	"Hurt U" (featuring Pharoahe Monch and Kardinal Offishall)	3:38
Total length:		70:04

== Critical reception ==
Professional ratings
Aggregate scores
Source	Rating
Metacritic	73/100
Review scores
Source	Rating
AllMusic	favorable
Exclaim!	mixed
HipHopDX	4.0/5
Pitchfork	7.6/10
RapReviews.com	8/10
Spin	favorable
XLR8R	7/10

At Metacritic, which assigns a weighted average score out of 100 to reviews from mainstream critics, White Van Music received an average score of 73, based on 8 reviews, indicating "generally favorable reviews".

Nate Patrin of Pitchfork gave the album a 7.6 out of 10, commenting that "the quality of the beats easily overcomes the somewhat odd novelty of hearing backpackers in close quarters with hardcore rappers, and with each listen it starts feeling more and more natural to have an all-star CD where M.O.P. and Little Brother both have hot tracks." Omar Mouallem of Exclaim! wrote, "Ultimately what it accomplishes (aside from a consistently and continuously good listen) is solidify Rhymesayers Entertainment as a serious label no longer limited to underground status."

HipHopDX included White Van Music on the "Top 25 Hip Hop Albums of 2008" list.

Jeff Weiss of LA Weekly placed "Get 'Er Done" at number 38 on the "50 Best Hip-Hop Songs of 2008" list.

=== Jake One's reaction ===
In 2025, Jake One discussed the album in an interview with StudioTalks:

White Van Music was my reaction to being signed to G-Unit and focusing all my energy on that at the time. I got burnt out making the beats they liked—specifically, repetitive one-bar loop-type beats. It was cool and fun for a while, but it wasn’t what I really wanted to do. I didn’t see myself as one of those guys making strictly commercial music. That wasn’t my goal.

With White Van Music, I wanted to pull together all of my influences and create something that felt cool and different to me. That’s why you have such a wide variety of artists on the album—like Brother Ali, Young Buck, MF Doom, and Keak Da Sneak. Back then, rap was very divided. You were either into East Coast hip-hop, underground rap, or commercial acts like Nelly and Chingy. But I liked pieces of all of it. Sure, I had preferences, but I wanted the album to reflect that mix and show I could bring it all together in a cohesive way.

My biggest inspiration for the album was Pete Rock’s Soul Survivor. To me, that’s still the best producer album of its time. A lot of producer albums feel like a collection of throwaway tracks from other projects, and sometimes that’s unavoidable. But that’s not what I was aiming for. I wanted to make something deliberate and original. [...] Overall, it was a special project for me. I still meet people who tell me how much they love the album, and that means a lot. It didn’t make me much money, but it helped grow my name and establish my identity as a producer. That was the point of it, and I think it achieved that.

== Charts ==
Chart (2008)	Peak position
US Heatseekers Albums (Billboard)	10
US Independent Albums (Billboard)	49
US Top R&B/Hip-Hop Albums (Billboard)	94
