= The Roc Boys =

Studio album by Beanie Sigel & Freeway
- Released: March 9, 2010
- Recorded: 2009–2010
- Genre: Hip-hop
- Length: 43:44
- Label: Siccness.net; eOne
- Producer: The Batkave; State Property; Main Event West

Beanie Sigel chronology
| The Broad Street Bully (2009) | The Roc Boys (2010) | This Time (2012) |

Freeway chronology
| The Stimulus Package (2010) | The Roc Boys (2010) | Diamond in the Ruff (2012) |

The Roc Boys is a collaborative studio album by State Property members Beanie Sigel and Freeway. The album was released on March 9, 2010. The album features guest appearances from Young Chris, Young Gunz, State Property, Jakk Frost, Wale and Tyeena.

== Background ==
Before the album's release, DMX was meant to make an appearance on the album but in the final recording he didn't appear on the album. The album was meant to be released on February 23, 2010, but was pushed back to March 9, 2010. Various tracks on the album had been previously leaked on the internet before the album's release

== Chart performance ==
The album charted on Billboards Top R&B album charts at number 53 and it also charted on the top rap albums at number 23.

== Track listing ==
| No. | Title | Producer(s) | Length |
|---|---|---|---|
| 1. | "Boss" | The Batkave | 2:58 |
| 2. | "The Last Two" (featuring Young Chris) | State Property | 3:47 |
| 3. | "Under Attack" | Main Event West | 3:33 |
| 4. | "Eeerrrlly" (featuring Tyeena) | State Property | 2:49 |
| 5. | "Serious" (featuring Young Chris) | The Batkave | 2:45 |
| 6. | "Back Ya Boyz Down" (featuring Jakk Frost) | State Property | 2:36 |
| 7. | "Word Right" | State Property | 3:08 |
| 8. | "Live In Effect" (featuring State Property) | State Property | 3:15 |
| 9. | "Fresh Ta Def" (featuring Young Chris) | The Batkave | 3:41 |
| 10. | "Cyphr" (featuring Wale and Young Gunz) | State Property | 2:36 |
| 11. | "May They Rest" | State Property | 3:41 |
| 12. | "Average Cat" | The Batkave | 7:05 |
| 13. | "Flatline" | Isiah Salazar | 1:53 |

== Charts ==
| Chart (2010) | Peak position |
|---|---|
| US Top R&B/Hip-Hop Albums (Billboard) | 53 |
