= The Fix (album) =

Studio album by Scarface
- Released: August 6, 2002
- Recorded: 2001–2002
- Genre: Hip hop
- Length: 47:16
- Labels: J. Prince; Skinny Gangster; Def Jam South
- Producers: Kanye West; Tony Pizarro; Nottz; the Neptunes; Mike Dean; China Black; Lee Stone; Nashiem Myrick; T-Mix; Lofey; Flip

Scarface chronology
The Last of a Dying Breed (2000)	The Fix (2002)	Balls and My Word (2003)

Singles from The Fix
- 1. "Guess Who's Back" Released: April 30, 2002; 2. "My Block" Released: July 30, 2002; 3. "Someday" Released: 2002

The Fix is the seventh studio album by American rapper Scarface, released on August 6, 2002. It debuted at No. 4 on the Billboard 200 chart, with over 160,000 copies sold in its first week. Jay-Z, Beanie Sigel, Nas, Faith Evans, and WC guested on the album. It was produced by Mike Dean, Kanye West, Tony Pizarro, Nottz, and the Neptunes. The Fix was met with critical acclaim.

The Fix was Scarface's first release on Def Jam Recordings; he became the president of Def Jam South in 2000. Three singles were released from The Fix. The first was the song "Guess Who's Back" featuring Jay-Z and Beanie Sigel. The second was "My Block", with a music video directed by Marc Klasfeld. The third single "Someday" contained a music video that was directed by former 10cc member Kevin Godley. The track "In Cold Blood" was featured on the video game Def Jam Vendetta, where Scarface is also included as a playable fighter.

In 2010, it was reported by HipHopDX Scarface would be making a sequel to The Fix called The Habit.

== Reception ==
Professional ratings
Review scores
Source	Rating
AllMusic	3/5 stars
Blender	4/5 stars
Entertainment Weekly	B+
NME	8/10
Pitchfork	6.3/10
Q	4/5 stars
Rolling Stone	4/5 stars
The Source	5/5 stars
Spin	8/10
Vibe	4/5

In 2009, Pitchfork ranked the album at No. 185 on their "Top 200 Albums of the 2000s" list.

== Track listing ==
No.	Title	Writer(s)	Producer(s)	Length
1.	"The Fix (Intro)"	B. Jordan; M. Dean	Mike Dean	0:57
2.	"Safe"	B. Jordan; T. Hom; C. Reid	China Black	3:56
3.	"In Cold Blood"	B. Jordan; K. West; S. Moy; F. Long	Kanye West	3:21
4.	"Guess Who's Back" (featuring Jay-Z, Beanie Sigel, and Kanye West)	B. Jordan; K. West; S. Carter; D. Grant; M. Sutton; B. Sutton; T. DePierro	Kanye West	4:15
5.	"On My Block"	B. Jordan; N. Myrick; L. Stone; R. Flack; D. Hathaway; C. Mann	Lee Stone; Nashiem Myrick	3:34
6.	"Keep Me Down"	B. Jordan; D. Lamb	Nottz	3:32
7.	"What Can I Do?" (featuring Kelly Price)	B. Jordan; T. Jones; K. Price	T-Mix	4:06
8.	"In Between Us" (featuring Nas and Tanya Herron)	B. Jordan; N. Jones; M. Dean; M. Sandlofer	Scarface; Mike Dean; Lofey	4:58
9.	"Someday" (featuring Faith Evans)	B. Jordan; C. Hugo; P. Williams	The Neptunes	6:00
10.	"Sellout"	B. Jordan; T. Jones	T-Mix	4:10
11.	"Heaven" (featuring Kelly Price)	B. Jordan; K. West; T. Jones; K. Price; R. Moore Jr.	T-Mix; Kanye West	3:14
12.	"I Ain't the One" (featuring WC)	B. Jordan; W. Calhoun; T. Pizarro; F. Wilcox; L.L. Goldsmith; F. Webb	Tony Pizarro; Flip	4:11
13.	"Fixed (Outro)"	B. Jordan; M. Dean	Mike Dean	1:02

== Personnel ==
- A&R [Administration] – Erica "Moon Unit" Novich
- Administrator [Recording Administration] – Vol S. Davis III
- Art Direction, Design – B. Jordan, Louis Marino
- Coordinator [Production] – Homer "Tray" Armstrong
- Creative Director – Rick Patrick
- Executive Producer – B. Jordan, J. Prince
- Lacquer Cut by RJ
- Mastered by Freaky Dean
- Photography by Vincent Soyez
- Producer [Associate Producers] – Randy Acker, Tina M. Davis
- Stylist – Monica Morrow

== Chart positions ==
=== Weekly charts ===
Chart (2002)	Peak position
US Billboard 200	4
US Top R&B/Hip-Hop Albums (Billboard)	1

=== Year-end charts ===
Year-end chart performance for The Fix by Scarface
Chart (2002)	Position
Canadian R&B Albums (Nielsen SoundScan)	122
Canadian Rap Albums (Nielsen SoundScan)	66
US Billboard 200	150
US Top R&B/Hip-Hop Albums (Billboard)	33
