= Flipside (Freeway song) =

2003 single by Freeway featuring Peedi Crakk

Single by Freeway featuring Peedi Crakk

from the album Philadelphia Freeway and Bad Boys II (soundtrack)
- Released: February 25, 2003
- Recorded: 2002
- Genre: Hip hop
- Length: 3:56
- Label: Island Def Jam; Roc-A-Fella
- Songwriters: Leslie Pridgen; Pedro Zayas; Justin Smith
- Producer: Just Blaze

Freeway singles chronology
"Alright" (2003)	"Flipside" (2003)	"Where U Been" (2005)

Peedi Crakk singles chronology
"One for Peedi Crakk" (2002)	"Flipside" (2003)	"Gotta Have It" (2004)

Music video
- "Flipside" on YouTube

"Flipside" is a song by American rapper Freeway, released as the third single from his debut studio album Philadelphia Freeway (2003). It features American rapper Peedi Crakk and was produced by Just Blaze. The single was released through The Island Def Jam Music Group and Jay-Z's Roc-A-Fella Records.

== Background ==
The song originated from an R&B version of "Roc the Mic" by Beanie Sigel and Freeway. Freeway made his song "Make the Cake" to the beat, while Just Blaze reworked the beat. The song originally featured rapper Oschino of the group State Property in the last verse, but he was removed from it. Peedi Crakk was later included on the track, in which he performs the intro and second verse. The song was renamed as "Flipside".

== Critical reception ==
Music critic Nathan Rabin praised the song, while writing for The A.V. Club: "The rapper shares Sigel's gruff soul-of-the-gutter sensibility, but proves surprisingly adept at poppy dance-rap on 'Flipside,' which features Blaze doing his best Timbaland impression."

== Music video ==
The music video was filmed in Philadelphia, Pennsylvania in May 2003. It shows Freeway having a block party on his block, until the police shut it down. The people continue to party at Peedi Crakk's block, but the police end it again. They then start partying on the rooftops. Memphis Bleek, drug kingpin Alton "Ace Capone" Coles, Michael Blackson, Shelly Rio, Jay-Z, Cousin Ervan (Cousin E), Young Gunz, Sparks, Oschino Vasquez, Beanie Sigel, Killer Mike, State Property, Damon Dash, and Kareem "Biggs" Burke all make cameo appearances.

== Charts ==
Chart (2003)	Peak position
US Billboard Hot 100	95
US Hot R&B/Hip-Hop Songs (Billboard)	40
