= Still Public Enemy Number 1 =

Still Public Enemy #1

Mixtape by Beanie Sigel
- Released: October 31, 2006
- Recorded: 2005–06
- Genre: Hip hop
- Label: MojoInk

Beanie Sigel chronology
The B. Coming (2005)	Still Public Enemy #1 (2006)	Return of the Bad Guy (2007)

Professional ratings
Review scores
Source	Rating
rapreviews	(7/10)

Still Public Enemy #1 is a mixtape by rapper Beanie Sigel released October 31, 2006. It reached Number 192 on The Billboard 200, #18 on Billboard's "Top Independent Albums", #34 on "Top R&B/Hip-Hop Albums" and #14 on "Top Rap Albums". After releasing the mixtape, Sigel expressed regret that he did not wait to market it through Koch Records, as he felt the successful release "should’ve put a couple million dollars in my pocket".

== Tracks ==
1. "Bigface Gary Intro" (featuring Bigface Gary) – 2:13
2. "Slim Chances Intro" (featuring Slim Chance) – 0:31
3. "Let Go" – 3:34
4. "Da Rain" (featuring Mook Jones) – 3:40
5. "Who Shot You" (featuring Mook Jones) – 3:44
6. "Same Ole Thang" – 2:29
7. "Beans Is Back" (featuring Mook Jones) – 3:40
8. "Ain't the Same" (featuring Mook Jones and Yung World) – 3:34
9. "All Nite" (featuring Mook Jones and Yung World) – 4:03
10. "They Not Us" – 3:14
11. "All Eyes on State" (featuring Mook Jones) – 3:29
12. "Philly's Finest" (featuring E. Ness and Mook Jones) – 3:16
13. "Slim Chances Outro" (featuring Slim Chance) – 0:24
14. "Bigface Gary Outro" (featuring Bigface Gary) – 1:36

== Personnel ==
- Slim Chance – performer
- Bigface Gary – performer
- George Geurin – mastering
- Mook Jones – performer
- E. Ness – performer
- Beanie Sigel – performer
- Yung World – performer

== Charts ==
Chart (2006)	Peak position
US Billboard 200	192
US Top R&B/Hip Hop Albums	34
US Top Independent Albums	18
US Top Rap Albums	14
