= Think Free (Freeway album) =

Studio album by Freeway
- Released: June 22, 2018
- Recorded: 2017–2018
- Studio: ER Studios; The Fire House; Level 89 Recording Studio; The Townhouse Number 46; The Boom Lounge; Mike Jerz Studio; HDE Studio; Philadelphia, Pennsylvania
- Genre: Hip hop
- Length: 46:37
- Label: New Rothchilds; Roc Nation
- Producer: Jay & P.I.; Robert "Bizness" Thomas; S. Frank; Scholito; DJ Skizz; Robert "E.S.T." Waller; Gamal Lewis; Ben Diehl; Terrance Rolle; Lou Diaz; Vidal Davis; Tryfe; Pop Traxx

Freeway chronology
Free Will (2016)	Think Free (2018)

Professional ratings
Review scores
Source	Rating
HipHopDX	3.9/5

Think Free is the sixth studio album by American rapper Freeway. The album was released on June 22, 2018, by New Rothchilds, LLC and Roc Nation.

== Track listing ==
- Credits adapted from liner notes.

No.	Title	Producer(s)	Length
1.	"Intro"	Jay & Pi; Robert "Bizness" Thomas	3:20
2.	"Blood Pressure" (featuring Lil Wayne)	S. Frank; Scholito	3:34
3.	"The Nation" (featuring Jadakiss)	S. Frank	2:53
4.	"Blessed" (featuring Faith Evans)	Jay & Pi	4:08
5.	"Legacy"	DJ Skizz	3:39
6.	"All Falls Down"	DJ Skizz	4:16
7.	"Life On The Line"	DJ Skizz	3:22
8.	"Cocaine White" (featuring Fat Joe)	Robert "E.S.T." Waller; Gamal Lewis; Ben Diehl; Terrance Rolle; Lou Diaz	4:00
9.	"All The Way Live"	Robert "Bizness" Thomas; Robert "E.S.T." Waller	2:46
10.	"Real One" (featuring BJ The Chicago Kid and Kamillion)	Vidal Davis	3:31
11.	"Swagger on a Mayo" (featuring Lil Uzi Vert)	Tryfe	3:00
12.	"About You" (featuring Johnny)	Jay & Pi; Robert "Bizness" Thomas	3:59
13.	"Come Back"	Pop Traxx	4:05
Total length:			46:37

== Personnel ==
- David Rivera - engineering
- Sam Croce - engineering
- Khalil Wilson - engineering
- JF Pierre - engineering
- Mike Jerz - engineering, mixing
- Pop Traxx - engineering
- Vidal Davis - engineering, mixing, mastering
- Freeway - executive producer
- Sherman Byers - executive producer
- Marc Byers - executive producer
- Jason Carbonell - A&R
- Leota Blackburn - marketing
- Michelle Lukianovich - art direction, design
- Jabari Jacobs - photography
