= Philadelphia Freeway 2 =

Studio album by Freeway
- Released: May 5, 2009
- Recorded: 2008–2009
- Genre: Hip hop
- Length: 39:46
- Label: Real Talk Entertainment
- Producers: Big Hollis; Cozmo; Preach; Real Talk Ent.; Vince V.

Freeway chronology
Free at Last (2007)	Philadelphia Freeway 2 (2009)	The Stimulus Package (2010)

Singles from Philadelphia Freeway 2
- 1. "Finally Free" Released: April 14, 2009

Professional ratings
Review scores
Source	Rating
AllMusic	3/5 stars
Cokemachineglow	62/100%
HipHopDX	3/5
Pitchfork	4.7/10

Philadelphia Freeway 2 is the third solo studio album by American rapper Freeway. It was released on May 5, 2009, via Real Talk Entertainment.

== Background ==
It is a sequel to his debut album Philadelphia Freeway. Production was handled by Big Hollis, Cozmo, Vince V., Real Talk Ent. and Preach, with Derrick Johnson serving as executive producer. It features a lone guest appearance from Sheek Louch. The album debuted at number 99 on the Billboard 200, number 19 on the Top R&B/Hip-Hop Albums, number 10 on the Top Rap Albums and number 14 on the Independent Albums, selling about 5,200 units in the US during its first week. The song "Finally Free" was released as a lead single off of the album.

== Track listing ==
No.	Title	Producer(s)	Length
1.	"Pay Attention"	Big Hollis	1:14
2.	"Finally Free"	Big Hollis	3:32
3.	"Gotz 2 Be tha Bomb"	Vince V.	4:08
4.	"Hands Up"	Cozmo	4:03
5.	"Think About It"	Real Talk Ent.	0:14
6.	"Crack Rap"	Cozmo	5:14
7.	"Murda Muzic"	Vince V.	3:43
8.	"Around the World"	Vince V.	3:54
9.	"Streets Won't Miss'em"	Big Hollis; Preach	3:13
10.	"The Nation"	Real Talk Ent.	0:22
11.	"It's a Good Day"	Cozmo	4:23
12.	"Keep Yo Hands Up" (featuring Sheek Louch)	Cozmo	4:04
13.	"Philly Freezer"	Big Hollis	1:42
Total length:			39:46

== Personnel ==
- Leslie "Freeway" Pridgen – vocals
- Sean "Sheek Louch" Jacobs – vocals (track 12)
- Walter Hollis – producer (tracks: 1, 2, 9, 13), mixing
- Vince V. – producer (tracks: 3, 7, 8)
- Cozmo Hickox – producer (tracks: 4, 6, 11, 12)
- Real Talk Ent. – producer (tracks: 5, 10)
- Preach of Beat Killaz – producer (track 9)
- Ken Lee – mastering
- Derrick "Sac" Johnson – executive producer

== Release history ==
- (Japan) (Brazil) May 5, 2009
- (United States) (Germany) (United Kingdom) May 19, 2009
- (Canada) (Australia) (Haiti) June 2, 2009

== Charts ==
Chart (2009)	Peak position
US Billboard 200	99
US Top R&B/Hip-Hop Albums (Billboard)	19
US Top Rap Albums (Billboard)	10
US Independent Albums (Billboard)	14
