= What We Do (song) =

2002 single featuring Jay-Z and Beanie Sigel

Single by Freeway featuring Jay-Z and Beanie Sigel

from the album Philadelphia Freeway
- Released: September 3, 2002
- Recorded: July 2002
- Studio: Baseline Studios
- Genre: East Coast hip-hop; chipmunk soul
- Length: 3:49
- Label: Roc-A-Fella, Def Jam
- Songwriters: Leslie Pridgen; Shawn Carter; Dwight Grant; Justin Smith; Skip Scarborough
- Producer: Just Blaze

Freeway singles chronology
| "Roc the Mic" (2002) | "What We Do" (2002) | "One for Peedi Crakk" (2002) |

Jay-Z singles chronology
| "Guess Who's Back" (2002) | "What We Do" (2002) | "'03 Bonnie & Clyde" (2002) |

Beanie Sigel singles chronology
| "Guess Who's Back" (2002) | "What We Do" (2002) | "One for Peedi Crakk" (2002) |

Music video
- "What We Do" on YouTube

"What We Do" is a song by American rapper Freeway. It was released on September 3, 2002, as the lead single from his debut studio album Philadelphia Freeway (2003). The song features American rappers Jay-Z and Beanie Sigel. It was produced by Just Blaze and contains a sample of "I Just Can't See Myself Without You" by Creative Source.

== Background ==
In the song, the rappers rap about committing acts that they know are illegal but still doing them in order to survive. In an interview, Freeway stated the song is "talkin' about all the things that we do in the streets is wrong but, of course, there are reasons why we're doing the wrong things that we do".

According to Just Blaze, "What We Do" was one of the first songs recorded for the album. Freeway originally planned for the track to be a solo and for Jay-Z to only have an ad-lib on it. Jay came to check on Freeway in the beginning of the album and on the end of the album. He made two visits to the studio. The first time he came to hear the album, Freeway played him "What We Do", and Jay said, "I gotta jump on it." After he did, Beanie Sigel recorded a verse for the song as well.

== Music video ==
The music video was filmed in the Brooklyn Navy Yard and directed by Nzingha Stewart. It is based on the television series The Wire and features cameos from Michael K. Williams, Hassan Johnson, Andre Royo, and J.D. Williams, as well as appearances from Damon Dash, Memphis Bleek, Cousin Ervan (Cousin E), Peedi Crakk, Young Gunz, and Beanie Sigel's mother.

== Charts ==
| Chart (2002–2003) | Peak position |
|---|---|
| US Billboard Hot 100 | 97 |
| US Hot R&B/Hip-Hop Songs (Billboard) | 47 |

== Certifications ==
| Region | Certification | Certified units/sales |
|---|---|---|
| United States (RIAA) | Gold | 500,000^{‡} |
^{‡} Sales+streaming figures based on certification alone.

== Release history ==
| Region | Date | Format(s) | Label(s) | Ref. |
|---|---|---|---|---|
| United States | November 11, 2002 | Rhythmic contemporary · urban contemporary radio | Def Jam | |
