= Paid in Full (soundtrack) =

Paid in Full (Hosted By The World Famous Brucie B)

Soundtrack album by Various artists
- Released: October 22, 2002
- Recorded: 2001–2002
- Genres: Hip hop; R&B
- Labels: Roc-A-Fella; Def Jam; Dimension
- Producers: Damon Dash; Just Blaze; Black Key; Brian "Lilz" Palmer; Craig Lawson; DJ Kick Ass; E-Bass; Kang George; Kanye West; King James II; M.A.J.; Megahertz; Neff-U; Pro & Boogie; Robert "Shim" Kirkland; Sergio "PLX" Moore; The Heatmakerz; Zukhan Bey

Dream Team (Hosted By DJ Clue)

Singles from Dream Team (Hosted by DJ Clue)
- 1. "One for Peedi Crakk" Released: 2002; 2. "Bout It Bout It..., Part III" Released: 2002; 3. "Ghost" Released: 2002; 4. "Alright" Released: 2003

Professional ratings
Review scores
Source	Rating
AllMusic	2.5/5 stars

Dame Dash Presents Paid in Full/Dream Team is the soundtrack album to the 2002 film, Paid in Full. It was released on October 22, 2002, by Roc-A-Fella Records and Def Jam Recordings. The soundtrack was released on two compact discs. The first disc was a collection of old school hip hop and R&B songs, while the second was a collection of new songs recorded by Roc-A-Fella. The album peaked at number 53 on the Billboard 200, number 10 on the Top R&B/Hip-Hop Albums chart and number 2 on the Top Soundtracks chart.

== Track listing ==
Disc 1: Paid in Full (Hosted by the World Famous Brucie B)
No.	Title	Writer(s)	Producer(s)	Length
1.	"Paid in Full" (Eric B. & Rakim)	Eric Barrier; William Griffin	Eric B. & Rakim	4:26
2.	"The Show" (Slick Rick and Doug E. Fresh)	Douglas Davis; Richard Walters	Dennis Ball; Ollie Cotton; Doug E. Fresh (co.)	4:26
3.	"New Generation" (The Classical Two)	Darney Rivers; Anthony Smith	Teddy Riley	5:00
4.	"Gangster Shit" (Mob Style featuring AZ, Pretty Tone and Gangster Lou)	Azie Faison	AZ	5:00
5.	"The Bridge Is Over" (Boogie Down Productions)	Lawrence Parker; Scott La Rock	KRS-One; Scott La Rock	4:01
6.	"I Got It Made" (Special Ed)	Special Ed; Howie Tee	Howie Tee	3:41
7.	"Fool's Paradise" (Meli'sa Morgan)	Lesette Wilson; Meli'sa Morgan	Lesette Wilson; Meli'sa Morgan	4:11
8.	"Before I Let Go" (Maze featuring Frankie Beverly)	Frankie Beverly	Frankie Beverly	5:01
9.	"In the Air Tonight" (Phil Collins)	Phil Collins	Phil Collins; Hugh Padgham	7:17
10.	"Goodbye Love" (Guy)	Aaron Hall; Gene Griffin; Teddy Riley; Timmy Gatling	Teddy Riley; Gene Griffin	4:56
11.	"Outro (Interview)" (Dame Dash and Jamal Joseph)			28:00

Disc 2: Dream Team (Hosted by DJ Clue)
No.	Title	Writer(s)	Producer(s)	Length
1.	"Champions" (Dame Dash, Kanye West, Beanie Sigel, Cam'Ron, Young Chris, and Twista)	Dame Dash; Kanye West; Dwight Grant; Cameron Giles; Christopher Ries; Freddie Mercury	Dame Dash; Kanye West	6:12
2.	"Roc Army" (Jay-Z, Cam'Ron, Freeway, Oschino & Sparks, Young Chris, and Peedi Crakk)	Shawn Carter; Giles; Leslie Pridgen; Kenneth Johnson; Umar Alwan; Zukhan Bey	Zukhan Bey	2:57
3.	"Bout It Bout It... Part III" (The Diplomats featuring Master P)	Craig Lawson; Percy Miller; Mia Young; Giles; Joseph Jones	Craig Lawson	5:20
4.	"One for Peedi Crakk" (Peedi Crakk, Beanie Sigel, Freeway, and Young Chris)	Pedro Zayas; Grant; Pridgen; Ries; Dorsey Wesley	Megahertz	4:49
5.	"1, 2 Y'all" (Memphis Bleek featuring Jay-Z, Lil' Cease and Geda K)	Malik Cox; Carter; Gary Grainger; James Lloyd; Renee Scroggins; Valerie Scroggins; Robert Kirkland; Eric Johnson	Shim; E Bass	5:45
6.	"Don't You Know" (Jay-Z)	Carter; Justin Smith; Simon Haseley	Just Blaze	3:30
7.	"You Know What I Want" (Rell featuring Cam'Ron)	Wilbur Ferrell Gaddis; Sergio Moore; Brian Palmer; Giles	Lilz; PLX	3:40
8.	"I'm Ready" (The Diplomats featuring Cam'Ron, Jimmy Jones, and Juelz Santana)	Giles; Jones; LaRon James; Gregory Green; Sean Thomas; Barbara Mason	Heatmakerz	4:44
9.	"Ghost" (Rick Vocals)	Derrick McGhee; James Jacobs	King James; Skaz Daddy (co.)	5:10
10.	"Home of Philly" (Beanie Sigel and Young Chris)	Grant; Mickey Davis; Ries	Black Keys	4:13
11.	"Alright" (Allen Anthony)	Allen Anthony; J. Smith; Ronnie Foster	Just Blaze; Gee Roberson (add.)	5:27
12.	"City" (M.O.P. and Lil' Red)	Eric Murray; Jamal Grinnage; Samantha Ronson; Ron Feemster; Charles Stanton	Ron Feemster	4:01
13.	"I Am Dame Dash" (Dame Dash, Cam'Ron, and Jimmy Jones)	Dash; Giles; Jones; Vicki Sue Robinson; J. Smith	Just Blaze	3:27
14.	"Fantasy Real" (Frankie featuring Freeway)	Franklin Jackson; Pridgen; S. Miller	DJ Kick Ass; Kang George	3:16
15.	"On & Poppin'" (Oschino & Sparks)	K. Johnson; Alwan; David Ewing; Jahmal Gwin; Freddie Perren; Keni St. Lewis	Pro; Boogz (co.)	3:30
16.	"Brooklyn Girl" (M.A.J.)	Mark Anthony Jones	M.A.J.	4:01

Sample credits

- "Champions" contains elements of "We Are the Champions, written by Freddie Mercury, performed by Queen.
- "Bout It Bout It... Part III" contains a sample from "Bout It Bout It II"; written by Craig Lawson, Percy Miller and Mia Young; performed by Master P.
- "1, 2, Y'all" contains a sample from "UFO", written by Renee Scroggins and Valerie Scroggins, performed by ESG.
- "Don't You Know" contains a sample of "Hogan's Thing", written and performed by Simon Haseley.
- "I'm Ready" contains a sample of Yes, I'm Ready", written and performed by Barbara Mason.
- "Home of Philly" contains elements from "Shoeshine Boy", written by Linda Allen and Harry Booker, performed by Eddie Kendricks.
- "Alright" contains an interpolation of "Mystic Brew", written by Ronnie Foster.
- "I Am Dame Dash" contains a sample of "Freeway Song", written by Joseph Melotti and Vicki Sue Robinson, performed by Vicki Sue Robinson.
- "On & Poppin'" contains excerpts from "Whodunit", written by Freddie Perren and Keni St. Lewis, performed by Tavares.

== Charts ==
=== Weekly charts ===
Chart (2002)	Peak position
US Billboard 200	53
US Top R&B/Hip-Hop Albums (Billboard)	10
US Soundtrack Albums (Billboard)	2

=== Year-end charts ===
Chart (2003)	Position
US Top R&B/Hip-Hop Albums (Billboard)	62
