= Free at Last (Freeway album) =

Studio album by Freeway
- Released: November 20, 2007
- Genres: East Coast hip-hop; Hardcore hip-hop
- Length: 51:01
- Labels: Roc-A-Fella; Def Jam
- Producers: Bink!; Carvin & Ivan; Chad "Wes" Hamilton; Cool & Dre; Dame Grease; Dangerous LLC; DJ Noodles; Don Cannon; Double-O; J.R. Rotem; Jake One; Needlz; Ron Fair

Freeway chronology
Philadelphia Freeway (2003)	Free at Last (2007)	Philadelphia Freeway 2 (2009)

Singles from Free at last
- 1. "Roc-A-Fella Billionaires" Released: July 10, 2007; 2. "Lights Get Low" Released: November 20, 2007

Free at Last is the second studio album by Philadelphia rapper Freeway. It was released on November 20, 2007 by Roc-A-Fella Records and Def Jam Recordings in the United States. The album enlists guest performances from Jay-Z, 50 Cent, Marsha Ambrosius, Rick Ross, Busta Rhymes, and Jadakiss.

== Background ==
In a November 2007 interview, Freeway explained why he took such a lengthy hiatus. He had this to say:

I just been grinding you know the whole Roc break up really took a toll on me and kind of even held my career up a little bit, but I been working and I'm ready to get back out. It was a couple of things. The whole family structure wasn't in place like it was. There was a time when I could just go to Bassline [studios] and knock it out but it wasn't like that this time.

== Production ==
Free at Last features production from Bink!, J. R. Rotem, Needlz, and Cool & Dre, amongst others. Guest appearances include Marsha Ambrosius, Jay-Z, 50 Cent, Scarface, Busta Rhymes, Jadakiss, and Rick Ross. According to Freeway, the album was executive-produced by 50 Cent—who also purchased publishing on the album—leading several publications to falsely conclude he was signed to G-Unit Records.

== Commercial performance ==
Free at Last debuted and peaked at number 42 on the U.S. Billboard 200 chart, selling about 36,000 units during its first week. As of April 2, 2008, the album has sold 100,206 copies in the United States.

"Roc-A-Fella Billionaires" is the lead single. The song, produced by Dame Grease, features a guest appearance from Roc-A-Fella label-boss and fellow American rapper Jay-Z. Grease's production contains a sample of a version of "Big Spender", originally written for the 1966 musical Sweet Charity, by Cy Coleman and Dorothy Fields, as performed by Chita Rivera and Paula Kelly.

== Critical reception ==
Professional ratings
Review scores
Source	Rating
About.com	4/5 stars
AllHipHop.com	8/10 stars
Allmusic	4/5 stars
Entertainment Weekly	B−
Pitchfork Media	(7.7/10)
Rolling Stone	3.5/5 stars
PopMatters	7/10 stars
USA Today	3.5/4 stars

Free at Last was called "The Album of the Month" by the German hip hop magazine Juice, aiming 5 of 6 "Crowns". In the 01-02 / 2008 Issue (# 104).

== Track listing ==
All tracks are written by Leslie Pridgen, with additional writers noted.

No.	Title	Writer(s)	Producer(s)	Length
1.	"This Can't Be Real" (featuring Marsha Ambrosius)	Ivan Barias; Carvin Haggins; Gil Scott-Heron	Carvin & Ivan	3:44
2.	"It's Over"	Jacob Dutton; Herb Magidson; Allie Wrubel	Jake One	3:40
3.	"Still Got Love"	Roosevelt Harrell; Curtis Mayfield	Bink!	3:45
4.	"Roc-A-Fella Billionaires" (featuring Jay-Z)	Damon Blackman; Shawn Carter; Cy Coleman; Dorothy Fields	Dame Grease	3:41
5.	"When They Remember"	Harrell; Alan Bergman; Marilyn Bergman; Marvin Hamlisch	Bink!	3:43
6.	"Take It To The Top" (featuring 50 Cent)	Jonathan Rotem; Curtis Jackson	J. R. Rotem; Carvin & Ivan (vocal)	3:42
7.	"Spit That Shit"	Teraike Crawford; Jason Turnbull; Ryan Presson	Teraike "Chris Styles" Crawford; Jason "Sire" Turnbull	3:43
8.	"Reppin' The Streets"	Chad Hamilton; Presson; Homer Banks; Carl Hampton	Chad "Wes" Hamilton	3:59
9.	"Free at Last" (featuring Kidz in the Hall)	Michael Aguilar; Presson; Michael Gradney Jr.; David Oliver	Double-O	3:38
10.	"Baby Don't Do It" (featuring Scarface)	Hamilton; Presson; Brad Jordan; Willie Hutch	Chad "Wes" Hamilton; Ryan Press (co.)	3:27
11.	"Nuttin' On Me"	Khari Cain	Needlz	2:55
12.	"Walk Wit Me" (featuring Busta Rhymes and Jadakiss)	Donald Cannon; Trevor Smith; Jason Phillips	Don Cannon	4:06
13.	"Lights Get Low" (featuring Rick Ross)	Marcello Valenzano; Andre Lyon; William Roberts	Cool & Dre	3:47
14.	"I Cry"	Matthew Naples; Raeford Gerald; Gary Byrd	DJ Noodles	3:11
Total length:				51:01

Leftover Track

- "Where U Been"

Sample credits

- "This Can't Be Real" embodies portions of "Did You Hear What They Said?", written by Gil Scott-Heron.
- "It's Over" contains elements of "I'm Afraid the Masquerade Is Over", written by Herb Magidson and Allie Wrubel, and performed by David Porter
- "Still Got Love" contains samples from "Eddie, You Should Know Better", written and performed by Curtis Mayfield.
- "Roc-A-Fella Billionaires" contains a sample of "Big Spender", from the "Sweet Charity Original Soundtrack", written by Cy Coleman and Dorothy Fields.
- "When They Remember" contains samples from "The Way We Were", written by Alan Bergman, Marilyn Bergman, and Marvin Hamlisch; and performed by Gladys Knight & the Pips.
- "Reppin' the Streets" contains samples from "I'll Be the Other Woman", written by Homer Banks and Carl Hampton, and performed by The Soul Children.
- "Free at Last" contains a sample of "I Wanna Write You a Love Song", written by Michael Gradney Jr. and David Oliver, and performed by David Oliver.
- "Baby Don't Do It", embodies portions of "Overture of Foxy Brown", written by Willie Hutch.
- "I Cry" contains a sample of "I Cry" written by Raeford Gerald and Gary Byrd, and performed by Millie Jackson.

== Charts ==
=== Weekly charts ===
Chart (2007)	Peak position
US Billboard 200	42
US Top R&B/Hip-Hop Albums (Billboard)	5

=== Year-end charts ===
Chart (2008)	Position
US Top R&B/Hip-Hop Albums	70
