= Guess Who's Back =

2002 single by Scarface ft. Jay-Z and Beanie Sigel

Single by Scarface featuring Jay-Z and Beanie Sigel

from the album The Fix
- A-side: "My Block"
- Released: April 30, 2002
- Recorded: 2002
- Genre: Hip hop
- Length: 4:15
- Label: Def Jam
- Songwriters: Brad Jordan; Shawn Carter; Dwight Grant; Kanye West; Michael Sutton; Brenda Sutton; Tom Depierro
- Producer: Kanye West

Scarface singles chronology
"I Luv" (2002)	"Guess Who's Back" (2002)	"My Block" (2002)

Jay-Z singles chronology
"Song Cry" (2002)	"Guess Who's Back" (2002)	"What We Do" (2002)

Beanie Sigel singles chronology
"Roc the Mic" (2002)	"Guess Who's Back" (2002)	"What We Do" (2002)

"Guess Who's Back" is a song by American rapper Scarface featuring American rappers Jay-Z and Beanie Sigel. It is the lead single from Scarface's seventh studio album The Fix (2002). The song was produced by Kanye West, who also provides uncredited vocals, and contains a sample of "Sunrise" by The Originals.

== Background and composition ==
The song was first recorded in New York. Scarface then brought it to producer Mike Dean, who mixed the song at Rap A Lot studios in Houston.

For production, Kanye West used a looped sample of "Sunrise" by The Originals and layered it over the drums in the instrumental of "Xxplosive" by Dr. Dre.

== Critical reception ==
In a review of The Fix, Pitchfork described the song as a "blazing track that wouldn't have sounded out of place on The Blueprint". Complex praised the song, calling it "a classic shit-talking, skill-flexing showdown".

== Charts ==
Chart (2002)	Peak position
US Billboard Hot 100	79
US Hot R&B/Hip-Hop Songs (Billboard)	28
US Hot Rap Songs (Billboard)	5
