= Free Will (Freeway album) =

Studio album by Freeway
- Released: April 29, 2016
- Recorded: 2015–2016
- Genre: Hip hop
- Length: 52:46
- Labels: Babygrande, iHipHop Distribution
- Producers: S. Frank; Scholito; Girl Talk; Tryfe; Chemist; L.E.S.; Money Alwayz

Freeway chronology
Diamond in the Ruff (2012)	Free Will (2016)	Think Free (2018)

Professional ratings
Review scores
Source	Rating
AllMusic	4/5 stars
Exclaim!	6/10
HipHopDX	3.4/5
XXL	4/5

Free Will is the fifth solo studio album by American rapper Freeway. It was released on April 29, 2016, via Babygrande Records and iHipHop Distribution. Production was handled by S. Frank, Scholito, Girl Talk, Tryfe, Chemist, L.E.S. and Money Alwayz, with Chuck Wilson and Freeway serving as executive producers. It features guest appearances from Raheem DeVaughn, Rod, Scholito and Young Buck.

== Track listing ==
No.	Title	Producer(s)	Length
1.	"Intro"	S. Frank; Scholito	2:24
2.	"Addiction"	Girl Talk	3:04
3.	"Hot as Ice"	S. Frank; Scholito	4:07
4.	"I'm Back"	S. Frank; Scholito	3:33
5.	"Highway" (featuring ROD)	Money Alwayz	3:39
6.	"Kodak"	S. Frank; Scholito	3:31
7.	"Illuminate"	S. Frank; Scholito	4:35
8.	"Kane & Abel"	L.E.S.; Chemist	2:52
9.	"My BM"	Tryfe	3:50
10.	"Bennie & Stella" (featuring Raheem DeVaughn)	S. Frank; Scholito	3:31
11.	"Work" (featuring Scholito)	S. Frank; Scholito	3:52
12.	"We Thuggin" (featuring Young Buck)	Tryfe	3:39
13.	"Always Love You"	Girl Talk	3:16
14.	"Legendary"	S. Frank; Scholito	3:23
15.	"First Thing's First"	Girl Talk	3:24
Total length:			52:46
