= Karmaloop =

Online streetwear retailer

- Website type: Private
- Founded: 2000
- Headquarters: Boston, United States
- No. of locations: Three; Boston, New York City and Nørresundby, Denmark
- Owner: Shiekh Shoes LLC
- Founder: Greg Selkoe
- Products: Apparel, Accessories, Footwear, Home Goods
- Website: Karmaloop.com

Karmaloop is a streetwear e-commerce company. It was founded in 2000 by Greg Selkoe and purchased by Shiekh Shoes in 2016.

== History ==
Karmaloop was founded in 1999 by Greg Selkoe in his parents' basement in Jamaica Plain, a neighborhood of Boston, Massachusetts. Selkoe's interests in break dancing, graffiti art, and fashion influenced his decision to focus his business on urban style and streetwear. His initial concept for Karmaloop was to provide universal reach for hard-to-find boutique streetwear brands.

The Karmaloop brick and mortar store on Boston's Newbury Street launched in 2005. The store carried products available on the website as well as limited edition items, and was often used as a testing ground for new products. In a 2010 interview, Selkoe revealed that the store "never made a penny," and in 2011 it closed. In the meantime Karmaloop's online presence grew to a number of websites including online retailer Karmaloop, women's fashion site MissKL, flash-sale site PLNDR, online skateboard shop Brick Harbor, independent marketplace Kazbah, subscription service Monark Box which mailed exclusive gear to members in exchange for a monthly fee and internet television station KarmaloopTV launched in collaboration with music producer Pharrell Williams and former AMC president Katie McEnroe.

In 2011, the company grew by 81%, generating $130 million in revenue. It continued to expand in 2012 and 2013, before starting to encounter financial troubles in 2014 due to debt obligations and the underperformance of some of the new arms of the business. In particular, the sites Monark Box, Miss KL, and Boylston Trading did not live up to expectations.

In 2015, Karmaloop filed for Chapter 11 bankruptcy protection. Annual revenue had fallen to $80 million, and the company was over $100 million in debt, $19 million of which it owed to vendors. Comvest Capital and CapX Partners purchased the company in May 2015 and announced plans to restructure its management, with Seth Haber named CEO, moving Selkoe to an advisory role.

In March 2016, Shiekh Shoes, a west coast footwear and apparel retailer, acquired Karmaloop for an undisclosed amount. However, in 2017, Sheikh Shoes filed for Chapter 11 bankruptcy protection.

== Marketing profile ==
Karmaloop employs the term "Verge Culture" to define its target lifestyle and demographic market: creative, early adopting digital natives who follow trends in music, fashion, art, technology, and action sports. It utilizes new media marketing techniques with a large mailing list and occasional interactive social media Livestream events, featuring musical performances and celebrity guests. to drive online sales and build brand loyalty.
