= Philadelphia Freeway =

Studio album by Freeway
- Released: February 25, 2003
- Recorded: 2002
- Studios: Baseline Studios (New York, NY); Quad Recording (New York, NY); Circle House Studios (Miami, FL); Sound on Sound (New York, NY); Larrabee Sound North (Los Angeles, CA)
- Genre: East Coast hip-hop
- Length: 60:38
- Labels: Criminal Background; Roc-A-Fella; Island Def Jam
- Producers: Shawn Carter (exec.); Damon Dash (exec.); Kareem "Biggs" Burke (exec.); Bink!; Black Key; Just Blaze; Kanye West; Ruggedness

Freeway chronology
Philadelphia Freeway (2003)	Free at Last (2007)

Singles from Philadelphia Freeway
- 1. "Line 'Em Up" Released: June 2002; 2. "What We Do" Released: September 3, 2002; 3. "Alright" Released: January 14, 2003; 4. "Flipside" Released: February 25, 2003

Philadelphia Freeway is the debut solo studio album by American rapper Freeway. It was released on February 25, 2003, via Roc-A-Fella Records. Recording sessions took place at Baseline Studios, Quad Recording Studios and Sound On Sound in New York, Circle House Studios in Miami and Larrabee North in Los Angeles. Production was handled by Just Blaze, Kanye West, Bink!, Black Key and Ruggedness, with co-producer E-Bass and additional producer Gee Roberson. It features guest appearances from Beanie Sigel, Jay-Z, Young Gunz, Allen Anthony, Faith Evans, Nate Dogg, Nelly, Sparks, Peedi Crakk, Rell, Snoop Dogg and Mariah Carey.

In the United States, the album debuted at number 5 on the Billboard 200, selling 132,000 copies in its first week. It was supported by four singles: "Line 'Em Up", "What We Do", "Alright" and "Flipside". Its lead single, "What We Do", featuring rappers Jay-Z and Beanie Sigel, reached number 97 on the Billboard Hot 100, number 47 on the Hot R&B/Hip-Hop Songs and received gold certification by the Recording Industry Association of America. The second single off of the album, "Alright", featuring former Christion member Allen Anthony, made it to number 64 on the Hot R&B/Hip-Hop Songs. The song was originally a solo song by Anthony, but its chorus and melody were reused for this song. The album's third and final single, "Flipside", featuring rapper Peedi Peedi, peaked at number 95 on the Billboard Hot 100, number 40 on the Hot R&B/Hip-Hop Songs and was featured on the Bad Boys II: The Soundtrack.

Its sequel, Philadelphia Freeway 2, was released on May 5, 2009, for Real Talk Entertainment.

== Critical reception ==
Professional ratings
Aggregate scores
Source	Rating
Metacritic	74/100
Review scores
Source	Rating
AllHipHop	3.5/5 stars
AllMusic	4.5/5 stars
Blender	4/5 stars
RapReviews	7/10
Rolling Stone	4/5 stars
Spin	A−
Stylus	5/10
The Village Voice	(1-star Honorable Mention)

Philadelphia Freeway was met with generally favourable reviews from music critics. At Metacritic, which assigns a normalized rating out of 100 to reviews from mainstream publications, the album received an average score of 74 based on seven reviews.

Chris Ryan of Spin called the album "the rare hip-hop debut that does justice to its buzz". Jon Caramanica of Rolling Stone stated that the album is "supported by the most accomplished set of beats in recent hip-hop memory". In his mixed review for Stylus, Brett Berliner concluded: "Freeway is great on guest appearances, but it seems that he can't string together an entire song by himself".

== Track listing ==
No.	Title	Writer(s)	Producer	Length
1.	"Free"	Leslie Pridgen; Justin Smith; Joey Melotti; Vicki Sue Robinson	Just Blaze	3:25
2.	"What We Do" (featuring Jay-Z and Beanie Sigel)	Pridgen; Shawn Carter; Dwight Grant; Smith; Skip Scarborough	Just Blaze	3:49
3.	"All My Life" (featuring Nate Dogg)	Pridgen; Nathaniel Hale; Roosevelt Harrell; Curtis Mayfield; Ben Krass	Bink!	5:31
4.	"Flipside" (featuring Peedi Crakk)	Pridgen; Pedro Zayas; Smith	Just Blaze	3:57
5.	"On My Own" (featuring Nelly)	Pridgen; Cornell Haynes; Smith	Just Blaze	4:09
6.	"We Get Around" (featuring Snoop Dogg)	Pridgen; Calvin Broadus; Smith	Just Blaze	3:56
7.	"Don't Cross the Line" (featuring Faith Evans)	Pridgen; Smith; Vinnie Barrett; Bobby Eli	Just Blaze	4:03
8.	"Life" (featuring Beanie Sigel)	Pridgen; Grant; Melvin Carter; Eddie Money	Ruggedness; E-Bass^{[a]}	4:32
9.	"Full Effect" (featuring Young Gunz)	Pridgen; Christopher Ries; Hanif Muhammad; Smith	Just Blaze	4:50
10.	"Turn Out the Lights (Freewest)"	Pridgen; Kanye West	Kanye West	3:59
11.	"Victim of the Ghetto" (featuring Rell)	Pridgen; Harrell; Yvette Davis	Bink!	5:12
12.	"You Don't Know (In the Ghetto)" (featuring Sparks)	Pridgen; Mickey Davis; Minnie Ripperton; Richard Rudolph; Leon Ware	Black Key	4:13
13.	"Alright" (featuring Allen Anthony)	Pridgen; Allen Anthony; Smith; Ronnie Foster	Just Blaze; Gee Roberson^{[b]}	5:26
14.	"Hear the Song"	Pridgen; West	Kanye West	3:36
Total length:				60:38

Bonus tracks
No.	Title	Writer(s)	Producer(s)	Length
15.	"You Got Me" (featuring Mariah Carey and Jay-Z)	Pridgen; Mariah Carey; Carter; Smith	Just Blaze; Mariah Carey	5:12
16.	"Line 'Em Up" (featuring Young Chris)	Pridgen; Ries; Smith	Just Blaze	4:46

Leftover Tracks

- "Roc the Mic (Remix)" (with Beanie Sigel featuring Nelly and Murphy Lee)
- "Show Go On" (with Twista featuring Bennie Franks)
- "Night Shift" (featuring Memphis Bleek and Carl Thomas)
- "Philly Niggas" (with Beanie Sigel)

Notes

- ^{^[a]} signifies a co-producer
- ^{^[b]} signifies an additional producer

Sample credits

- "Free" contains a sample of "Freeway Song", written by Joey Melotti and Vicki Sue Robinson, and performed by Vicki Sue Robinson.
- "What We Do" contains a sample from "I Just Can't See Myself Without You", written by Skip Scarborough, and performed by Creative Source.
- "All My Life" contains a sample of "I Want To Go Back", written by Curtis Mayfield and Ben Krass, and performed by The Impressions.
- "Don't Cross the Line" contains a sample of "To Get Love You Must Give Love", written by Vinnie Barrett and Bobby Eli, and performed by Ultimate Music Experience.
- "Life" contains an interpolation of "Life for the Taking", written by Eddie Money.
- "Victim of the Ghetto" contains a sample of "We Belong Together", written by Yvette Davis, and performed by The Spinners.
- "You Don't Know (In the Ghetto)" contains a sample of "Inside My Love", written by Minnie Ripperton, Richard Rudolph, and Leon Ware; and performed by Minnie Ripperton.
- "Alright" contains an interpolation of "Mystic Brew", written and performed by Ronnie Foster.
- "Hear This Song" contains a sample of "Will You Cry (When You Hear This Song)", written by Bernard Edwards and Nile Rodgers; and performed by Chic.

== Personnel ==
- Leslie "Freeway" Pridgen – vocals
- Shawn "Jay-Z" Carter – vocals (tracks: 2, 15), executive producer
- Dwight "Beanie Sigel" Grant – vocals (tracks: 2, 8)
- Nathaniel "Nate Dogg" Hale – vocals (track 3)
- Pedro "Peedi Crakk" Zayas – vocals (track 4)
- Cornell "Nelly" Haynes – vocals (track 5)
- Calvin "Snoop Dogg" Broadus – vocals (track 6)
- Faith Evans – vocals (track 7)
- M.A.J. – additional vocals (track 8)
- Christopher "Young Chris" Ries – vocals (tracks: 9, 16)
- Hanif "Neef Buck" Muhammad – vocals (track 9)
- Gerrell "Rell" Gaddis – vocals (track 11)
- Kenneth "Omillio Sparks" Johnson – vocals (track 12)
- Alaine Laughton – additional vocals (track 12)
- Allen Anthony – vocals (track 13)
- Torrey Torae – additional vocals (track 14)
- Mariah Carey – vocals & producer (track 15)
- Eric "E-Bass" Johnson – guitar & bass (track 8)
- Justin "Just Blaze" Smith – producer (tracks: 1, 2, 4–7, 9, 13, 15, 16)
- Roosevelt "Bink!" Harrell III – producer (tracks: 3, 11)
- Melvin "Ruggedness" Carter – producer (track 8)
- Kanye West – producer (tracks: 10, 14)
- Mickey "Black Key" Davis – producer (track 12)
- Gerald Roberson – additional producer (track 13)
- Gimel "Young Guru" Keaton – recording (tracks: 1, 2, 4, 5, 7, 8, 11, 16), mixing (tracks: 1, 2, 4, 5, 7, 9, 12, 13, 16)
- Carlisle Young – recording (tracks: 1, 3–5, 9, 12, 14)
- Brian Stanley – recording & mixing (track 3)
- Doug Wilson – recording (tracks: 3, 6, 11), mixing (tracks: 6, 11)
- Shane "Bermuda" Woodley – recording (tracks: 6, 7, 9, 10, 12–14)
- Rabeka Tunei – recording (tracks: 10, 14)
- Pat Viala – mixing (track 8)
- Manny Marroquin – mixing (tracks: 10, 14)
- Ken Lewis – mixing (track 15)
- Paul Gregory – engineering (track 15)
- Dana Jon Chappelle – engineering (track 15)
- Colin Miller – engineering assistant (track 15)
- Dave Perini – engineering assistant (track 15)
- Giulio Antognini – engineering assistant (track 15)
- Manuel Farolfi – engineering assistant (track 15)
- Tony Dawsey – mastering
- Damon Dash – executive producer
- Kareem "Biggs" Burke – executive producer
- Tia Johnson – art direction, design, cover
- Jonathan Mannion – photography

== Charts ==
=== Weekly charts ===
Chart (2003)	Peak position
US Billboard 200	5
US Top R&B/Hip-Hop Albums (Billboard)	3

=== Year-end charts ===
Chart (2003)	Position
US Billboard 200	192
US Top R&B/Hip-Hop Albums (Billboard)	38

== Certifications ==
Region	Certification	Certified units/sales
United States (RIAA)	Gold	500,000^{‡}
^{‡} Sales+streaming figures based on certification alone.
