= The Stimulus Package =

Studio album by Freeway and Jake One
- Released: February 16, 2010
- Genre: Hip hop
- Length: 55:03 (standard edition); 60:54 (deluxe edition)
- Label: Rhymesayers Entertainment
- Producer: Jake One

Freeway chronology
Philadelphia Freeway 2 (2009)	The Stimulus Package (2010)	The Roc Boys (2010)

Jake One chronology
White Van Music (2008)	The Stimulus Package (2010)	Tuxedo (2015)

Singles from The Stimulus Package
- 1. "She Makes Me Feel Alright"; 2. "Know What I Mean" Released: December 17, 2009

Professional ratings
Aggregate scores
Source	Rating
AnyDecentMusic?	6.9/10
Metacritic	78/100
Review scores
Source	Rating
About.com	4/5 stars
AllMusic	4/5 stars
Robert Christgau	B
HipHopDX	3.5/5 stars
Pitchfork	6.5/10
PopMatters	9/10 stars
Rolling Stone	3.5/5 stars
Spin	3/5 stars
Tiny Mix Tapes	3.5/5 stars
URB	4/5 stars

The Stimulus Package is a 2010 collaborative studio album by Philadelphia rapper Freeway and Seattle producer Jake One. It was released on Minneapolis indie hip hop label Rhymesayers Entertainment on February 16, 2010. The album included two singles, "Know What I Mean" and "She Makes Me Feel Alright", both of which have had videos made for them. The album debuted at number 63 on the Billboard 200, selling over 9,000 units in its first week.

The album would be followed up with a sequel fourteen years later, appropriately titled The Stimulus Package 2, released on July 19, 2024.

== Background ==
Freeway and Jake One had previously collaborated on various projects, including on Jake's 2008 album White Van Music and on Freeway's albums and mixtapes, including 2007's Free at Last and 2008's Month of Madness.

Jake One made the beat for "She Makes Me Feel Alright" while "just messing around" with a sample of Rick James' "Mary Jane". Freeway said this of the album in an interview:

I just think the chemistry is there. With me and Jake we got a good chemistry and the same thing with me and Just [Blaze]. When you got a chemistry it’s just good, everything comes together perfect. The songs were coming out beautiful and they just feel good. [...] Actually he just was sending me folders of beats and I was knockin [sic] songs out and sendin em back. For the most part everything was coming out crazy, so we came up with the concept of us doing an album together and took it from there.

== Critical reception ==
The Stimulus Package has received generally favorable reviews from critics. Metacritic gave the album a score of 78/100, based on 15 reviews. AllMusic included it on their "Favorite Rap/Hip-Hop Albums of 2010" list, while DJ Premier listed it as one of his favorite 25 albums of 2010.

Jake One named "Never Gonna Change" and "One Thing" as his favorite tracks off of the album. The album was re-released by vinyl subscription service Vinyl Me, Please in November 2024, as their "Hip-Hop Record of the Month".

== Track listing ==
All tracks are written by Jacob Dutton and Leslie Pridgen.

The Stimulus Package track listing
No.	Title	Length
1.	"Stimulus Intro" (featuring Beanie Sigel)	1:54
2.	"Throw Your Hands Up"	3:45
3.	"One Foot In"	3:30
4.	"She Makes Me Feel Alright"	3:37
5.	"Never Gonna Change"	3:46
6.	"One Thing" (featuring Raekwon)	3:48
7.	"Know What I Mean"	2:17
8.	"The Product"	3:39
9.	"Microphone Killa" (featuring Young Chris)	3:30
10.	"Follow My Moves" (featuring Birdman)	4:07
11.	"Sho' Nuff" (featuring Bun B)	4:15
12.	"Freekin' the Beat" (featuring LaToiya Williams)	4:24
13.	"Money" (featuring Omilio Sparks and Mr. Porter)	3:56
14.	"Free People"	3:01
15.	"Stimulus Outro"	5:34
16.	"African Drums" (deluxe edition bonus track)	3:07
17.	"Always-N-Forever" (deluxe edition bonus track)	2:44

=== Samples ===
- "Throw Your Hands Up" contains an interpolation of "Passin' Me By", written by Romye Robinson, Trevant Hardson, Emandu Wilcox, Derrick Stewart, and Juan Martinez-Luis, and performed by The Pharcyde.
- "One Foot In" contains a sample of "Can You Still Love Me", written by Billy Beck, James Williams, Marshall Jones, Marvin Pierce, Ralph Middlebrooks, Clarence Satchell, and Leroy Bonner, and performed by Ohio Players.
- "She Makes Me Feel Alright" contains a sample of "Mary Jane", written and performed by Rick James.
- "Never Gonna Change" contains an interpolation of the traditional song "Row, Row, Row Your Boat".
- "Know What I Mean" contains a sample of "Feelin' Good", written by Leslie Bricusse and Anthony Newley, and performed by Clara Ward.
- "The Product" contains a sample of "Cirkus", written by Robert Fripp and Peter Sinfield, and performed by King Crimson.

== Charts ==
Chart (2010)	Peak position
US Billboard 200	63
US Independent Albums (Billboard)	5
US Top R&B/Hip-Hop Albums (Billboard)	19
