= Peedi Peedi =

American rapper (born 1977)

Peedi Crakk
- Also known as: Peedi Crakk; Peedi
- Born: Pedro Louis Zayas; September 25, 1977 (age 48); Philadelphia, Pennsylvania, U.S.
- Genres: Hip hop
- Occupation: Rapper
- Years active: 1998–present
- Labels: Amalgam Digital; Roc-A-Fella; Def Jam (former)
- Formerly of: State Property

Pedro Louis Zayas (born September 25, 1977), better known by his stage names Peedi Crakk or Peedi Peedi, is an American rapper. He is best known for his guest appearances on Freeway's 2003 single "Flipside" and Jay-Z's album The Blueprint 2: The Gift & The Curse (2002). He was a member of the Roc-A-Fella Records group State Property. He is of Puerto Rican descent.

== Career ==
Pedro Zayas grew up in North Philadelphia. He first signed to Roc-A-Fella Records in 2001, with the help of longtime friend Freeway, who had already joined the label through Beanie Sigel and his State Property entourage. In 2002, his Megahertz-produced debut single, "One for Peedi Crakk", charted in the Top 40 of the Billboard Hot R&B/Hip-Hop Songs chart. He continued to appear as a guest on several Roc-A-Fella albums, including Jay-Z's The Blueprint²: The Gift & the Curse and Freeway's Philadelphia Freeway. These appearances helped build his reputation among East Coast hip hop audiences. As his exposure increased, Zayas modified his stage name from "Peedi Crakk" to "Peedi Peedi."

In 2005, Peedi’s career was disrupted by two major developments: the dissolution of State Property and the formal split of Roc-A-Fella Records. The label was divided between Jay-Z, who remained with Def Jam and retained 50 percent of the imprint, and co-founder Dame Dash, who took the other 50 percent to Universal Records under the Dame Dash Music Group. Peedi declined to follow Sigel and Dash, and became a free agent briefly before Jay-Z, who had become president of Def Jam, re-signed him under the Roc-A-Fella imprint. Peedi began work on a debut album titled Prince of the Roc, but its release was repeatedly delayed.

In 2006, Peedi was featured on Game Theory, the first Def Jam release by Philadelphia-based hip hop band The Roots, appearing on the single "Long Time". Shortly afterward, Roots drummer and bandleader ?uestlove offered him a provisional spot with the group. Peedi expressed interest in joining The Roots.

The only single released from his shelved album was "Take Me Home," released in 2007. Growing frustrated with delays, Peedi began to publicly criticize Jay-Z and released several diss tracks aimed at the executive. He was officially released from his contract in 2008.

That same year, he signed with the internet-based label Amalgam Digital, and planned to release a new album in September 2008. The album, originally titled A Night in the Life and scheduled for March 24, was later pushed to May 2009. As of now, the album has no confirmed release date.

== Discography ==
=== Albums ===
- Crakk Files Vol. 1 (2004)
- Crakk Files Vol. 2 (2006)
- Crakk Files Vol. 3 (2007)
- Torture Crakk Is Bakk (2007)
- Prince of the Roc (Unreleased) (2007)
- Welcome to Crakk's House (2008)
- A Night in the Life (Unreleased) (2009)
- Crakk Files Vol. 4 (2011)
- CF5: The Cocaine Edition (2013)
- Crime Partners (2017)

=== Singles ===
==== Solo ====
Year	Song	Chart positions			Album
Year	Song	U.S. Hot 100	U.S. R&B	U.S. Rap	Album
2002	"One for Peedi Crakk" (featuring Beanie Sigel, Freeway & Young Chris produced by Megahertz)	—	— (Note: "One for Peedi Crakk" did not enter the Hot R&B/Hip-Hop Songs chart, but peaked at number 33 on the Hot R&B/Hip-Hop Singles Sales chart.)	—	Paid In Full/Dream Team
2007	"Take Me Home" (featuring Megan Rochell)	—	—	—	Prince of the Roc

==== As featured artist ====
Year	Song	Chart positions			Album
Year	Song	U.S. Hot 100	U.S. R&B	U.S. Rap	Album
2003	"Flipside" (Freeway featuring Peedi Crakk)	95	40	—	Philadelphia Freeway and Bad Boys II OST
2004	"Gotta Have It" (Beanie Sigel featuring Peedi Peedi and Twista)	—	82	—	The B. Coming
2006	"Stay" (Ne-Yo featuring Peedi Crakk)	—	36	—	In My Own Words
2011	"Damn It Feels Good to Be a Gangsta" (Geto Boys cover) featuring Lil Eto, Peedi Crakk, Cuban Link & Poerilla	—	36	—	

== See also ==
- List of Afro-Latinos
