= Jake One =

American record producer (born 1976)

- Jake One in 2021

Background information
- Born: Jacob Brian Dutton; May 11, 1976 (age 50)
- Origin: Seattle, Washington, U.S.
- Genres: Hip hop; trap; Northwest hip hop
- Occupations: Record producer; songwriter
- Years active: 1992–present
- Labels: Conception; Liquor Barrel; G-Unit; Rhymesayers; Stones Throw; Street Corner; Rappers I Know; Snare Jordan; Venice Music

Jacob Brian Dutton (born May 11, 1976), known professionally as Jake One, is an American record producer and songwriter.

== Early life and career ==
Jacob Brian Dutton was born in 1976 and grew up in the Central District and moved to the North End of Seattle when he was 15. He started making music on a Casio keyboard in 1992. He attended the University of Washington and gave a tape of his music to a friend who worked in a local record store. One of the store's other employees, the DJ Mr. Supreme heard the tape, and when he set up his Conception Records label, he used Dutton to create backing tracks. The first record he produced was Eclipse's "World Premier". His early influences included Pete Rock, Dr. Dre, DJ Premier, and Marley Marl.

Dutton produced the 2005 song "The Time Is Now" by professional wrestler John Cena; it has been Cena's entrance theme since. He has had tracks included on the soundtracks to films such as Get Rich or Die Tryin' (50 Cent's "I Don't Know Officer"), The Fast and the Furious: Tokyo Drift ("Jake Alert"), and Gone Baby Gone.

He was a part of the G-Unit production team The Money Management Group. His first album credited to Jake One, White Van Music, was released on October 7, 2008, on Rhymesayers Entertainment, which features contributions from Brother Ali, Young Buck, De La Soul, M.O.P., Freeway, D.Black, MF Doom, Slug, and Keak da Sneak.

In 2010, Dutton released two collaborative albums, The Stimulus Package with Freeway and Patience with Truthlive. In 2012, he produced Brother Ali's album Mourning in America and Dreaming in Color.

Seattle's Museum of History and Industry (MOHAI) curated and showcased an exhibit called The Legacy of Seattle Hip Hop from September 19, 2015, through May 1, 2016. One section featured mixing stations that played tracks by Vitamin D and Dutton, as well as letting visitors interact with the tracks by using the mixing boards.

In 2024, he and Freeway announced The Stimulus Package 2. On April 19, they released "Freezer" as the lead single from the album, which was followed on May 24 by "Ringin" featuring Jadakiss. The album released on July 19.

== Discography ==
=== Albums ===
List of albums, with selected chart positions
Title	Album details	Peak chart positions	
Title	Album details	US	US R&B
White Van Music	Released: October 7, 2008; Label: Rhymesayers; Format: CD, LP, digital download	—	94
The Stimulus Package (with Freeway)	Released: February 16, 2010; Label: Rhymesayers; Format: CD, LP, digital download	63	19
Tuxedo (with Mayer Hawthorne)	Released: March 3, 2015; Label: Stones Throw; Format: CD, LP, digital download	—	16
Prayer Hands Emoji	Released: October 21, 2016; Label: Street Corner Music/Rappers I Know; Format: CD, LP, digital download	—	—
Tuxedo II (with Mayer Hawthorne)	Released: March 24, 2017; Label: Stones Throw; Format: CD, LP, digital download	—	—
Tuxedo III (with Mayer Hawthorne)	Released: July 19, 2019; Label: Funk in Sight; Format: CD, LP, digital download	—	—
Seaplane	Released: April 23, 2021; Label: Snare Jordan; LP, cassette, digital download		
The Stimulus Package 2 (with Freeway)	Released July 19, 2024; Label: Venice Music, General Principle Records; Format: CD, LP, digital download	—	—
12/96	Released September 17, 2024; Label: Snare Jordan; Format: Digital download	—	—
Tuxedo IV (with Mayer Hawthorne)	Released November 1, 2024; Label: Funk in Sight; Format: CD, LP, digital download	—	—
"—" denotes a recording that did not chart or was not released in that territory.
