= Freeway (rapper) =

American rapper (born 1978)

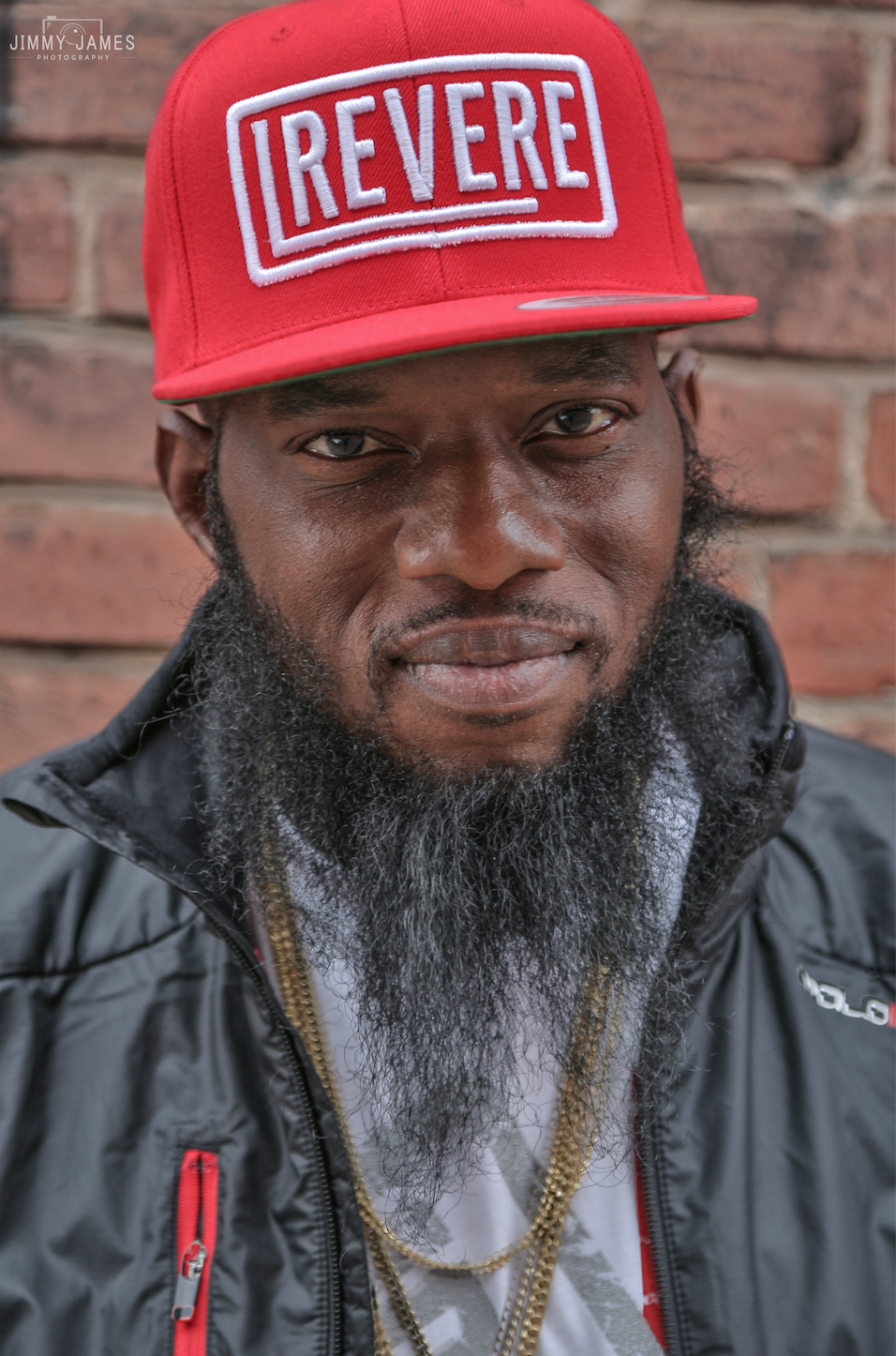
- Freeway in 2017

Background information
- Born: Leslie Edward Pridgen; August 6, 1978 (age 48); North Philadelphia, Pennsylvania, U.S.
- Genre: Hip-hop
- Occupations: Rapper; songwriter
- Years active: 1999–present
- Labels: New Rothchilds; Roc Nation; Rhymesayers; Babygrande; Real Talk; Def Jam; Roc-A-Fella
- Member of: State Property

Leslie Edward Pridgen (born August 6, 1978), better known by his stage name Freeway, is an American rapper. Based in Philadelphia, Pennsylvania, he first gained recognition after appearing on Jay-Z's fifth album, The Dynasty: Roc La Familia, in 2000. The following year, he joined the Philadelphia-based hip-hop collective State Property, who were signed to Jay-Z's Roc-A-Fella Records, an imprint of Def Jam Recordings.

After the release of State Property's self-titled debut album (2002), Pridgen signed with Roc-A-Fella to release his first two solo albums, Philadelphia Freeway (2003) and Free at Last (2007). Both critically praised, the former album peaked at number five on the Billboard 200, while the latter was the final project released before him and fellow State Property members were dropped from the label.

Pridgen independently released his next three albums: Philadelphia Freeway 2 (2009), Diamond in the Ruff (2012), and Free Will (2016). He returned to work with Jay-Z in 2018, signing with Roc-A-Fella's successor label, Roc Nation, to release his sixth album, Think Free in June of that year.

== Life and career ==
=== Early life and career beginnings ===
Freeway was born Leslie Pridgen, in North Philadelphia, Pennsylvania. At the age of 14, he converted to Islam and identifies as a devout Muslim. He adopted his moniker from the name of the infamous drug trafficker "Freeway" Rick Ross as he found no one wanted to listen to a rapper named Leslie. Freeway began his career by participating in freestyle battles in his high school and met fellow Philadelphia native Beanie Sigel, while rapping on stage at a hometown nightclub. Not long after being signed to Roc-A-Fella Records, Sigel put in a word for Freeway, who made his first appearance on The Dynasty: Roc La Familia, on the track "1-900-Hustler" with Sigel, Jay-Z, and Memphis Bleek. After the appearance, Jay-Z signed him to a deal; he was featured on "Think it's a Game", also alongside Jay-Z, on Sigel's second album The Reason. In 2001, he underwent a notorious freestyle battle with then-unsigned rapper Cassidy, hosted by Swizz Beatz and lost with a unanimous judges decision.

=== Philadelphia Freeway (2003) ===
On February 25, 2003, Freeway released his debut album, Philadelphia Freeway. The album was produced primarily by Roc-A-Fella-affiliated beatsmiths Just Blaze, Bink!, and Kanye West and featured a large number of Roc-A-Fella rappers. Many of them also hailed from Philadelphia, and were soon compiled into the group State Property led by Freeway and Beanie Sigel. The album had two singles, the biggest hits of Freeway's career thus far: "What We Do", featuring Jay-Z and Beanie Sigel, for which a video was released showcasing most of the Roc's roster at the time, and "Flipside", featuring State Property member Peedi Crakk; both records were produced by Just Blaze. The album also sold over 500,000 units in the United States.

=== State Property problems and Ice City (2004–2006) ===
After Jay-Z's "retirement" album and the uncertainty over what direction the label was headed, Beanie Sigel was arrested and jailed on a charge of attempted murder. Relations between Beanie Sigel and State Property soured after the incarceration of Sigel, and State Property essentially broke up, with Sigel stating he was unsure he would work with them again. Over the next few years, members of the group—most notably Freeway and Sigel themselves—slowly began collaborating once again, though members such as Oschino and Peedi Crakk fell out of the loop. During this time, with his crew and label in turmoil, Freeway turned to his Muslim faith. With uncertainty in the air, Freeway put together another Philadelphia-based crew called Ice City, named after their North Philly neighborhood. While active, the group consisted of Face Money, Bars and Hydro, with Freeway playing a major mentoring role. Their debut album, Welcome to the Hood, was released under Sure Shot Recordings, but received little attention. Subsequently, groupmember Hydro released a mixtape dissing Freeway, distancing himself and the group from its founder.

=== Free At Last and departure from Roc-A-Fella (2007–2009) ===
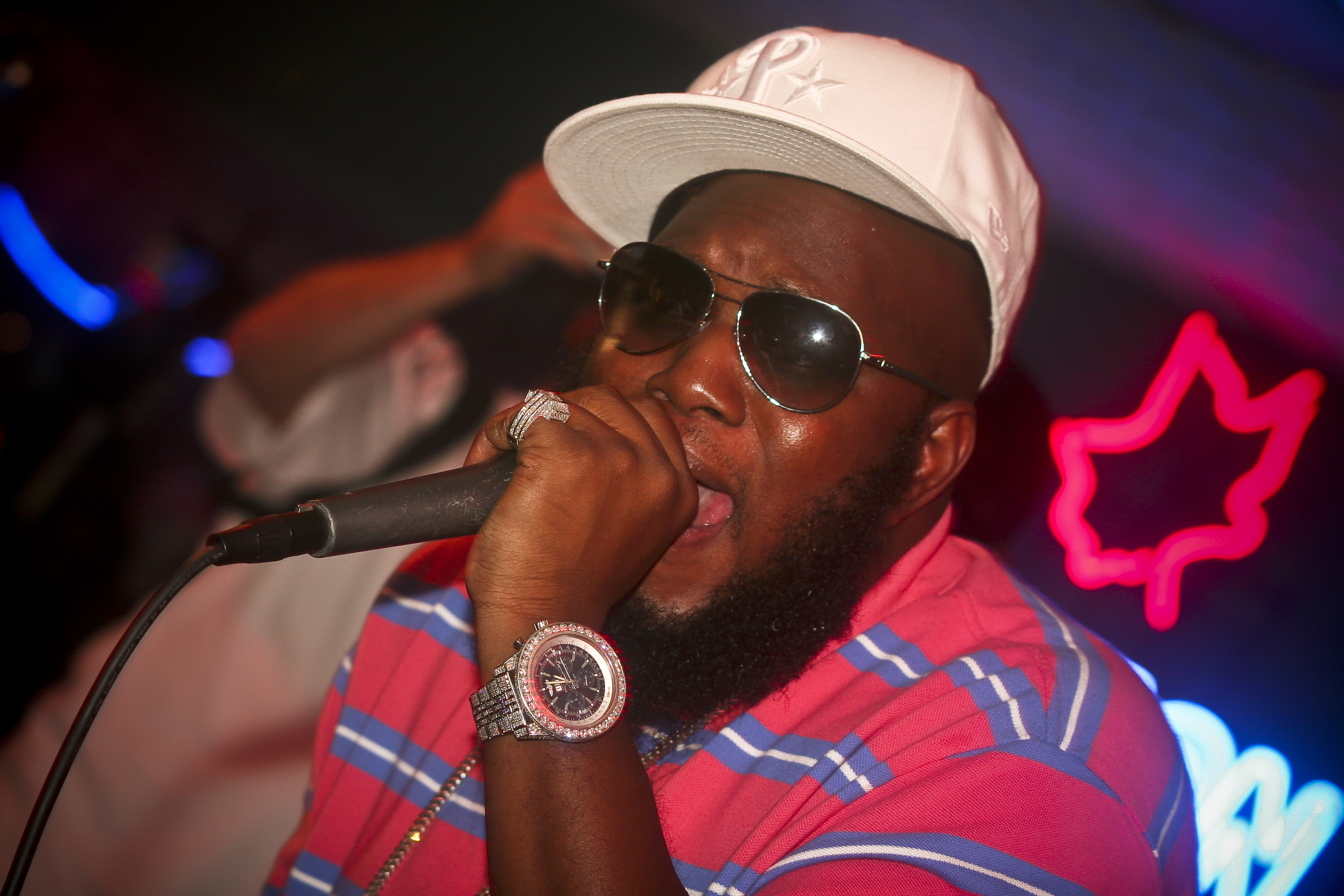
Freeway performing in Wilmington, Delaware in July 2008.

In response to a crisis of faith, Freeway went on hiatus for a few years, making his Hajj, a journey to the holy city of Mecca, required by every Muslim at least once in his or her lifetime if they are able. Upon his return, Freeway recorded his second album Free at Last, which was released in the United States on November 20, 2007. Initially, Jay-Z and 50 Cent were both set to co-executive produce the album; while both were featured, the project ended up solely a Roc-A-Fella release, with 50 giving up his co-executive producer's role. The first single was "Roc-A-Fella Billionaires", featuring Jay-Z, which leaked to the internet; the second single, and first official single, was "Lights Get Low" featuring Rick Ross and Dre of the production team Cool & Dre. As the album featured no production from either Kanye West or Just Blaze, who together produced the lion's share of his debut, Freeway lashed out at them in his lyrics, generating rumors that he and his former producers had unresolved differences. After the album's release, Freeway went on record to clarify his comments, saying he had no real animosity towards them and that he had only been speaking his mind. The album eventually sold over 100,000. In 2008, Freeway initiated what he called the Month of Madness, releasing a song a day for the month of December. The songs, featuring input from Phoe Notes, Erick Sermon, Don Cannon, Cardiak, Jake One, Oddisee and others, were later compiled into a mixtape. The year 2009 brought an announcement that he would be working on his third album amidst his regrets over hearing Jay-Z had stepped down as Def Jam president. Shortly afterward, the rapper announced his release from Def Jam, which distributed a now defunct Roc-A-Fella Records, and that his next album would be titled The Stimulus Package, produced by Jake One and released by Rhymesayers Entertainment.

=== Philadelphia Freeway 2 and record deals (2009) ===
A project titled Philadelphia Freeway 2 was released on the independent label Real Talk Entertainment on May 19, 2009. The first single, "Finally Free", was released on iTunes on April 14, 2009. Freeway also made an original song "Car Jack" for the 2009 game Grand Theft Auto IV: The Lost and Damned. On March 19, 2009, he performed at SXSW. Freeway released his mixtape "The Beat Made Me Do It" on November 13, 2009, which featured production by veteran producer Jake One with assistance by Don Cannon to officially announce his 2010 Rhymesayers debut album The Stimulus Package. Rhymesayers and Freeway leaked the first official track and video, "Know What I Mean" off of The Stimulus Package on December 1, 2009.

In June 2009, Freeway had confirmed a deal with Cash Money Records, and the start of his own label, Free Money. Following this, he put out a few mixtape tracks speaking of the deal, including "Touchdown" and "All Night Long".

Freeway, speaking on that label deal and his relationship with Jay-Z:

"I been fucking with Cash Money," he said in an interview. "You know, me and Wayne did a joint for the last album, but we couldn't get the shit cleared in time and all that. We just throwing around some ideas. And I'm launching a label, Free Money, so what better home for it...My man Ceelo, he worked with Baby, so he really basically connected us like that. But, right now everything is still in preliminary...It's still Roc-A-Fella for life. That's something that's not going to leave me...Everything still preliminary. Jay give me his blessing with whatever I want to do. Jay want to see niggas making moves."

=== Diamond In the Ruff (2010–2014) ===
In a video interview with KarmaloopTV in 2010, Freeway announced a new clothing line in the works titled "Freestyle". In addition to the new clothing line, Free also announced an album called Diamond In The Ruff which featured production from Jake One, Bink!, Needlz and Just Blaze. Freeway explained in the interview that the album should have come after Philadelphia Freeway. Diamond In the Ruff was released November 27, 2012, and featured collaborations with Rick Ross and Black Thought. Freeway recorded an EP with Statik Selektah, called the Statik-Free EP, which was completed in 24 hours and released on iTunes on January 11, 2011.

Freeway also released a collaboration in 2014 with DJ mashup artist Girl Talk, an EP called Broken Ankles, which included stylistic attributes that would normally be included in transitions between Girl Talk segments.

=== Free Will and health scare (2015–2017) ===
In 2015, Freeway was diagnosed with kidney failure, and as a result, wrote about dealing with the experience on his 2016 album, Free Will, which he released independently. He began what became a three-year wait for a kidney transplant, and currently serves as the official ambassador for the Kidney Foundation. On Free Will, frequent Nas collaborator L.E.S. produced "Kane & Abel," and Girl Talk produced "Addiction," "Always Love You" and "First Things First." G-Unit's Young Buck has a feature spot on "We Thuggin."

=== Think Free and the return to the Roc (2018–2019) ===
After years away, Freeway returned to working with Jay-Z at his entertainment company called Roc Nation in 2018. Under this umbrella, Freeway's sixth solo album, Think Free, was released that year on June 22, and its 13 songs include appearances from Lil Wayne, Lil Uzi Vert, Jadakiss, BJ The Chicago Kid, Fat Joe, Faith Evans and more. The first singles released were "All Falls Down," "All the Way Live" and "Blood Pressure," with the latter featuring Lil Wayne.

Prior to the release of Think Free, Freeway announced he was filming the Think Free documentary, a video account offering a behind-the-scene look at his music, family life, and health following the diagnosis of kidney failure. The documentary, which was originally scheduled to accompany the Think Free album, has yet to be released. The rapper underwent a kidney transplant in February 2019.

== Personal life ==
Freeway had 2 children. His son, Jihad Pridgen, who performed as SnowHadd, died in 2020 at the age of 20. His daughter Harmony died in 2021 after a battle with an unspecified cancer.

== Discography ==
Studio albums

- Philadelphia Freeway (2003)
- Free at Last (2007)
- Philadelphia Freeway 2 (2009)
- Diamond in the Ruff (2012)
- Free Will (2016)
- Think Free (2018)

Collaborative albums

- State Property OST (with State Property) (2002)
- The Chain Gang Vol. 2 (with State Property) (2003)
- The Stimulus Package (with Jake One) (2010)
- The Roc Boys (with Beanie Sigel) (2010)
- Highway Robbery (with The Jacka) (2014)
- The Stimulus Package 2 (with Jake One) (2024)
- 365 (with Damon Dash & The Black Guns) (2025)
- The215Way ( with son of the 215) (2025)

== Video games ==
- Def Jam: Fight for NY (2004) as himself
- Def Jam Fight for NY: The Takeover (2006) as himself
