= R. Kelly discography =

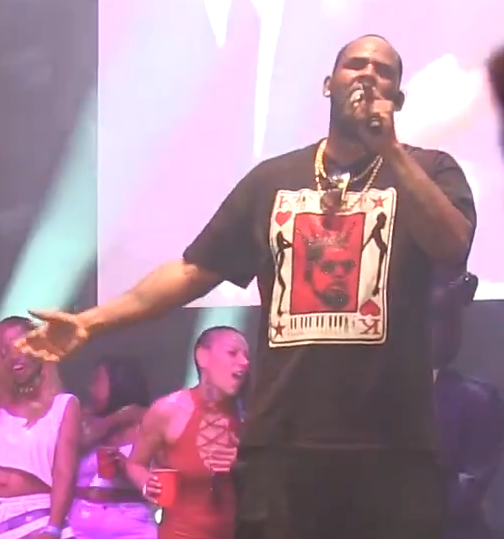
- R. Kelly in 2017
- Studio albums: 18
- Extended plays: 2
- Soundtrack albums: 1
- Compilation albums: 3
- Singles: 133
- Video albums: 6
- Mixtapes: 1
- Promotional singles: 10

American R&B singer-songwriter R. Kelly has released 18 studio albums, five compilation albums, one soundtrack album, six video albums, one mixtape, two extended play, and 133 singles (including 49 as a featured artist and 12 promotional singles).

== Albums ==
=== Studio albums ===
List of studio albums, with selected chart positions, sales figures and certifications
Title	Album details	Peak chart positions										Sales figures	Certifications
Title	Album details	US	US R&B	AUS	CAN	FRA	GER	NLD	SWE	SWI	UK	Sales figures	Certifications
Born into the 90's (with Public Announcement)	Released: January 14, 1992 (US); Label: Jive; Formats: CD, LP, cassette, digital download	42	3	146	—	79	—	50	—	—	67		RIAA: Platinum
12 Play	Released: November 9, 1993 (US); Label: Jive; Formats: CD, LP, cassette, digital download	2	1	142	—	—	—	66	—	—	20		RIAA: 6× Platinum; BPI: Gold; MC: Gold
R. Kelly	Released: November 14, 1995 (US); Label: Jive; Formats: CD, LP, cassette, digital download	1	1	63	69	—	69	26	32	—	18		RIAA: 5× Platinum; BPI: Gold; MC: Gold; NVPI: Gold
R.	Released: November 10, 1998 (US); Label: Jive; Formats: CD, LP, cassette, digital download	2	1	65	25	17	8	3	33	26	27		RIAA: 8× Platinum; BPI: Platinum; BVMI: Gold; IFPI SWI: Gold; MC: Platinum; NVPI: 2× Platinum; SNEP: 2× Gold
TP-2.com	Released: November 7, 2000 (US); Label: Jive; Formats: CD, LP, cassette, digital download	1	1	78	7	4	2	7	23	6	21		RIAA: 4× Platinum; BPI: Gold; BVMI: Gold; IFPI SWI: Gold; MC: Platinum; NVPI: Gold; SNEP: 2× Gold
The Best of Both Worlds (with Jay-Z)	Released: March 19, 2002 (US); Label: Jive, Roc-A-Fella, Def Jam, Rockland; Formats: CD, LP, cassette, digital download	2	1	100	19	20	22	12	42	18	37		RIAA: Platinum; SNEP: Gold
Chocolate Factory	Released: February 18, 2003 (US); Label: Jive; Formats: CD, LP, cassette, digital download	1	1	31	14	18	18	25	—	18	10		RIAA: 2× Platinum; BPI: Gold
Happy People/U Saved Me	Released: August 24, 2004 (US); Label: Jive; Formats: CD, LP, cassette, digital download	2	1	62	16	19	10	10	26	21	11		RIAA: 3× Platinum; BPI: Gold
Unfinished Business (with Jay-Z)	Released: October 26, 2004 (US); Labels: Roc-A-Fella, Def Jam, Rockland; Formats: CD, LP, digital download	1	1	198	14	68	77	60	—	65	61		RIAA: Platinum
TP.3 Reloaded	Released: July 5, 2005 (US); Label: Jive; Formats: CD, cassette, digital download	1	1	41	17	21	26	19	48	30	23		RIAA: Platinum; BPI: Silver
Double Up	Released: May 29, 2007 (US); Labels: Jive, Zomba; Formats: CD, digital download	1	1	101	19	49	46	34	37	39	10		RIAA: Platinum
Untitled	Released: December 1, 2009 (US); Label: Jive; Formats: CD, digital download	4	1	—	—	157	—	—	—	—	—		
Love Letter	Released: December 14, 2010 (US); Labels: Jive, Sony; Formats: CD, digital download	6	2	—	—	—	—	26	—	—	153		RIAA: Gold
Write Me Back	Released: June 26, 2012 (US); Label: RCA; Formats: CD, digital download	5	2	—	—	120	—	32	54	—	80	US: 300,000	
Black Panties	Released: December 10, 2013 (US); Label: RCA; Formats: CD, digital download	4	2	—	—	—	—	94	—	—	128	US: 502,000	RIAA: Gold
The Buffet	Released: December 11, 2015 (US); Label: RCA; Formats: CD, digital download	16	1	—	—	—	—	—	—	—	—	US: 140,000	
12 Nights of Christmas	Released: October 21, 2016 (US); Label: RCA; Formats: CD, digital download	177	11	—	—	—	—	—	—	—	—		
"—" denotes a recording that did not chart or was not released in that territory.

=== Compilation albums ===
List of compilation albums, with selected chart positions and certifications
Title	Album details	Peak chart positions										Certifications
Title	Album details	US	US R&B	AUS	CAN	GER	NLD	NZ	SWE	SWI	UK	Certifications
The R. in R&B Collection, Vol. 1	Released: September 23, 2003; Label: Jive; Formats: CD, LP, cassette, digital download	4	2	33	14	17	7	42	49	19	4	RIAA: Platinum; BPI: 3× Platinum
Remix City, Volume 1	Released: November 15, 2005; Label: Jive; Formats: CD, digital download	72	14	—	—	—	—	—	—	—	—	
Playlist: The Very Best of R. Kelly	Released: June 1, 2010; Labels: Jive, Legacy; Format: CD, digital download	—	60	—	—	—	—	—	—	—	—	
Epic	Released: September 21, 2010; Label: Jive; Formats: CD, digital download	—	—	—	—	—	—	—	—	—	—	
The World's Greatest	Released: September 23, 2011; Label: Jive; Formats: CD, digital download	—	—	—	—	—	—	—	—	—	—	BPI: Gold
The Essential R. Kelly	Released: May 19, 2014; Label: RCA; Formats: CD, digital download	144	26	—	—	—	—	—	—	—	—	BPI: Gold
"—" denotes a recording that did not chart or was not released in that territory.

=== Soundtrack albums ===
List of soundtrack albums
Title	Album details
Trapped in the Closet Chapters 1–12 soundtrack	Released: November 8, 2005; Label: Jive; Formats: Digital download

=== Video albums ===
List of video albums, with selected certifications
Title	Album details	Certifications
The R. in R&B – The Video Collection	Released: September 23, 2003; Label: Jive; Format: DVD	RIAA: Platinum
Trapped in the Closet: Chapters 1–12	Released: October 1, 2005; Labels: Jive, Zomba; Format: DVD	RIAA: 2× Platinum
R. Kelly Light It Up Tour Live	Released: March 20, 2007; Label: Jive; Format: DVD	
Trapped in the Closet: Chapters 13–22	Released: August 21, 2007; Labels: Jive, Zomba; Formats: DVD	RIAA: Platinum
Trapped in the Closet: The BIG Package	Released: December, 2007; Label: Jive, Zomba; Formats: CD	
Trapped in the Closet: Chapters 23–33	Released: February 13, 2013; Labels: RCA; Format: Digital download	

=== Mixtapes ===
List of mixtapes
Title	Album details
The "Demo" Tape	Released: June 2009; Formats: CD, digital download

== Singles ==
=== As lead artist ===
List of singles as lead artist, with selected chart positions and certifications, showing year released and album name
Title	Year	Peak chart positions										Certifications	Album
Title	Year	US	US R&B	AUS	FRA	GER	NLD	NZ	SWE	SWI	UK	Certifications	Album
"Why You Wanna Play Me?" (with MGM)	1990	—	—	—	—	—	—	—	—	—	—		Non-album single
"She's Got That Vibe" (with Public Announcement)	1991	59	7	28	—	—	15	19	—	—	3	BPI: Silver	Born into the 90's
"Honey Love" (with Public Announcement)	1992	39	1	123	—	—	52	—	—	—	—	RIAA: Platinum	Born into the 90's
"Slow Dance (Hey Mr. DJ)" (with Public Announcement)	1992	43	1	—	—	—	—	—	—	—	—		Born into the 90's
"Hey Love (Can I Have a Word)" (with Public Announcement, featuring Mr. Lee)	1992	— (Note: "Hey Love (Can I Have a Word)" did not enter the Billboard Hot 100, but peaked at number one on the Bubbling Under Hot 100 Singles chart.)	15	—	—	—	—	23	—	—	—		Born into the 90's
"Dedicated" (with Public Announcement)	1993	31	9	—	—	—	—	—	—	—	—		Born into the 90's
"Sex Me"	1993	20	8	—	—	—	—	—	—	—	75	RIAA: Gold	12 Play
"Bump n' Grind"	1994	1	1	82	—	—	—	49	—	—	8	RIAA: Platinum; BPI: Platinum; RMNZ: Platinum	12 Play
"Your Body's Callin'"	1994	13	2	—	—	—	—	43	—	—	19	RIAA: Gold	12 Play
"Summer Bunnies"	1994	55	20	—	—	—	—	—	—	—	23		12 Play
"U Will Know" (with Black Men United)	1994	28	5	—	—	—	—	—	—	—	—		Jason's Lyric (soundtrack)
"You Remind Me of Something"	1995	4	1	96	—	—	41	9	—	—	21	RIAA: Platinum	R. Kelly
"Down Low (Nobody Has to Know)" (featuring Ron Isley)	1996	4	1	—	—	—	—	20	—	—	23	RIAA: Platinum	R. Kelly
"Thank God It's Friday"	1996	—	—	60	—	—	—	33	—	—	14		R. Kelly
"I Can't Sleep Baby (If I)"	1996	5	1	108	—	63	42	—	—	—	24	RIAA: Platinum	R. Kelly
"I Believe I Can Fly"	1996	2	1	24	17	1	2	1	11	1	1	RIAA: Platinum; BPI: Platinum; BVMI: Gold; IFPI SWI: Gold; NVPI: Gold; RMNZ: Gold; SNEP: Silver	Space Jam (soundtrack)/R.
"Gotham City"	1997	9	9	100	—	3	9	—	9	9	9	RIAA: Gold; BVMI: Gold	Batman & Robin (soundtrack)/R.
"Half on a Baby"	1998	—	61	120	—	38	19	18	—	43	16		R.
"I'm Your Angel" (with Celine Dion)	1998	1	5	31	97	14	9	5	10	7	3	RIAA: Platinum; ARIA: Gold; BPI: Silver	R. and These Are Special Times
"Home Alone" (featuring Keith Murray and Kelly Price)	1998	65	22	—	39	82	70	43	60	39	17		R.
"When a Woman's Fed Up"	1999	22	5	—	—	25	25	14	—	—	—		R.
"Did You Ever Think" (featuring Nas)	1999	27	8	—	—	26	24	—	—	98	20		R.
"If I Could Turn Back the Hands of Time"	1999	12	5	65	2	2	1	39	3	1	2	RIAA: Gold; BPI: Platinum; BVMI: Platinum; IFPI SWE: Platinum; IFPI SWI: Gold; NVPI: Platinum; SNEP: Gold	R.
"Only the Loot Can Make Me Happy"	2000	—	—	166	—	—	—	14	—	—	24		R.
"Bad Man"	2000	— (Note: "Bad Man" did not enter the Billboard Hot 100, but peaked at number 18 on the Bubbling Under Hot 100 Singles chart.)	30	—	32	57	34	—	—	50	—		Shaft (soundtrack)
"I Wish"	2000	14	1	77	40	10	6	—	50	29	12	RIAA: Gold	TP-2.com
"A Woman's Threat"	2001	— (Note: "A Woman's Threat" did not enter the Billboard Hot 100, but peaked at number 15 on the Bubbling Under Hot 100 Singles chart.)	35	—	—	43	64	—	—	58	—		TP-2.com
"The Storm Is Over Now"	2001	—	—	96	57	13	29	—	38	6	18		TP-2.com
"Fiesta" (Remix) (featuring Jay-Z and Boo & Gotti)	2001	6	1	69	17	8	48	—	46	11	23		TP-2.com
"Feelin' on Yo Booty"	2001	36	9	—	—	—	—	—	—	—	—		TP-2.com
"The World's Greatest"	2001	34	31	104	13	3	2	41	7	11	4	BPI: Platinum; BVMI: Gold; IFPI SWE: Gold; RMNZ: Gold	Ali (soundtrack)
"Honey" (with Jay-Z)	2002	—	— (Note: "Honey" did not enter the Hot R&B/Hip-Hop Songs chart, but peaked at number nine on the Bubbling Under R&B/Hip-Hop Singles chart.)	84	—	—	—	—	—	—	35		The Best of Both Worlds
"Get This Money" (with Jay-Z)	2002	— (Note: "Get This Money" did not enter the Billboard Hot 100, but peaked at number 15 on the Bubbling Under Hot 100 Singles chart.)	37	—	—	—	—	—	—	—	—		The Best of Both Worlds
"Take You Home with Me (A.K.A. Body)" (with Jay-Z)	2002	81	41	—	—	—	—	—	—	—	—		The Best of Both Worlds
"Ignition (Remix)"	2002	2	2	1	38	36	12	1	46	38	1	ARIA: Platinum; BPI: 3× Platinum; RMNZ: 4× Platinum	Chocolate Factory
"Snake" (featuring Big Tigger)	2003	16	9	—	—	—	—	—	—	—	10		Chocolate Factory
"Soldier's Heart"	2003	80	84	—	—	—	—	—	—	—	—		Non-album single
"Thoia Thoing"	2003	13	6	16	30	23	10	—	55	18	14		The R. in R&B Collection, Vol. 1
"Step in the Name of Love" (Remix)	2003	9	1	—	—	69	48	—	—	83	14		Chocolate Factory
"Happy People"	2004	19	7	—	—	49	40	—	—	49	6		Happy People/U Saved Me
"U Saved Me"	2004	52	14	—	—	—	40	—	—	49	6		Happy People/U Saved Me
"Big Chips" (with Jay-Z)	2004	39	17	—	—	—	—	—	—	—	—		Unfinished Business
"Don't Let Me Die" (with Jay-Z)	2004	— (Note: "Don't Let Me Die" did not enter the Billboard Hot 100, but peaked at number 24 on the Bubbling Under Hot 100 Singles chart.)	58	—	—	—	—	—	—	—	—		Unfinished Business
"Trapped in the Closet, Chapter 1"	2005	22	5	—	51	35	48	22	—	28	33		TP.3 Reloaded
"In the Kitchen"	2005	91	16	—	51	35	48	22	—	28	33		TP.3 Reloaded
"Playa's Only" (featuring The Game)	2005	65	36	—	51	35	48	22	—	28	33		TP.3 Reloaded
"Slow Wind"	2005	— (Note: "Slow Wind" did not enter the Billboard Hot 100, but peaked at number three on the Bubbling Under Hot 100 Singles chart.)	30	—	—	—	—	—	—	—	—		TP.3 Reloaded
"Burn It Up" (featuring Wisin & Yandel)	2005	—	—	—	—	30	25	—	—	25	—		TP.3 Reloaded
"I'm a Flirt" (Remix) (featuring T.I. and T-Pain)	2007	12 (Note: Both R. Kelly and Bow Wow recorded versions of "I'm a Flirt" crediting them as the lead artist: the similar characteristics of both versions led Billboard to combine both songs under the same chart run in the United States.)	2	59	—	55	—	20	—	78	18	RIAA: Platinum; RMNZ: Platinum	Double Up
"Same Girl" (with Usher)	2007	20	4	47	—	—	—	4	20	—	26	RIAA: Gold; BPI: Silver; RMNZ: Platinum	Double Up
"Rock Star" (featuring Ludacris and Kid Rock)	2007	—	54	—	—	—	—	—	—	—	—		Double Up
"I Believe"	2008	—	— (Note: "I Believe" did not enter the Hot R&B/Hip-Hop Songs chart, but peaked at number nine on the Bubbling Under R&B/Hip-Hop Singles chart.)	—	—	92	—	—	—	—	—		Non-album single
"Number One" (featuring Keri Hilson)	2009	59	8	—	—	—	—	—	58	—	190		Untitled
"Religious"	2009	—	48	—	—	—	—	—	—	—	—		Untitled
"Echo"	2009	—	52	—	—	—	—	—	—	—	—		Untitled
"Sign of a Victory" (featuring Soweto Spiritual Singers)	2010	—	81	—	—	—	—	—	—	—	—		Listen Up! The Official 2010 FIFA World Cup Album
"When a Woman Loves"	2010	93	16	—	—	—	38	—	—	—	—		Love Letter
"Love Letter"	2010	— (Note: "Love Letter" did not enter the Billboard Hot 100, but peaked at number two on the Bubbling Under Hot 100 Singles chart.)	13	—	—	—	—	—	—	—	—		Love Letter
"Radio Message"	2011	—	31	—	—	—	—	—	—	—	—		Love Letter
"Number One Hit"	2011	—	80	—	—	—	—	—	—	—	—		Love Letter
"Share My Love"	2012	— (Note: "Share My Love" did not enter the Billboard Hot 100, but peaked at number 21 on the Bubbling Under Hot 100 Singles chart.)	13	—	—	—	—	—	—	—	—		Write Me Back
"Feelin' Single"	2012	— (Note: "Feelin' Single" did not enter the Billboard Hot 100, but peaked at number 13 on the Bubbling Under Hot 100 Singles chart.)	15	—	—	—	—	—	—	—	—		Write Me Back
"When a Man Lies"	2012	—	—	—	—	—	—	—	—	—	—		Write Me Back
"I Look to You" (with Whitney Houston)	2012	—	90	—	—	—	—	—	—	—	—		I Will Always Love You: The Best of Whitney Houston
"My Story" (featuring 2 Chainz)	2013	89	27	—	—	—	—	—	—	—	—		Black Panties
"Genius"	2013	—	— (Note: "Genius" did not enter the Hot R&B/Hip-Hop Songs chart, but peaked at number one on the Bubbling Under R&B/Hip-Hop Singles chart.)	—	—	—	—	—	—	—	—		Black Panties
"Cookie"	2013	—	49	—	—	—	—	—	—	—	—		Black Panties
"Legs Shakin" (featuring Ludacris)	2014	—	— (Note: "Legs Shakin" did not enter the Hot R&B/Hip-Hop Songs chart, but peaked at number five on the Bubbling Under R&B/Hip-Hop Singles chart.)	—	—	—	—	—	—	—	—		Black Panties
"Bump & Grind 2014" (with Waze & Odyssey)	2014	—	—	39	—	—	—	—	—	—	3	BPI: Gold	Non-album single
"Backyard Party"	2015	—	— (Note: "Backyard Party" did not enter the Hot R&B/Hip-Hop Songs chart, but peaked at number 27 on the R&B/Hip-Hop Airplay chart.)	—	—	—	—	—	—	—	—		The Buffet
"Switch Up" (featuring Lil Wayne and Jeremih)	2015	—	—	—	—	—	—	—	—	—	—		The Buffet
"—" denotes a recording that did not chart or was not released in that territory.

=== As featured artist ===
List of singles as featured artist, with selected chart positions and certifications, showing year released and album name
Title	Year	Peak chart positions										Certifications	Album
Title	Year	US	US R&B	AUS	FRA	GER	NLD	NZ	SWE	SWI	UK	Certifications	Album
"Payday" (The Winans featuring R. Kelly)	1993	—	74	—	—	—	—	—	—	—	—		All Out
"Down with the Clique" (Aaliyah featuring R. Kelly)	1995	—	—	—	—	—	—	—	—	—	33		Age Ain't Nothing but a Number
"Street Dreams" (Remix) (Nas featuring R. Kelly)	1996	—	—	—	—	—	—	—	—	—	12		Street Dreams: The Remixes
"All of My Days" (Changing Faces featuring Jay-Z and R. Kelly)	1997	65	38	—	—	—	—	—	—	—	—		All Day, All Night and Space Jam soundtrack
"Gone Till November" (Makin' Runs Remix) (Wyclef Jean featuring Canibus and R. Kelly)	1998	—	—	—	—	—	—	—	—	—	—		Non-album single
"Be Careful" (Sparkle featuring R. Kelly)	1998	— (Note: "Be Careful" did not enter the Billboard Hot 100, but peaked at number 32 on the Hot 100 Airplay chart.)	— (Note: "Be Careful" did not enter the Hot R&B/Hip-Hop Songs chart, but peaked at number one on the R&B/Hip-Hop Airplay chart.)	—	—	52	4	—	—	—	7		Sparkle
"Friend of Mine" (Remix) (Kelly Price featuring R. Kelly and Ron Isley)	1998	12	1	—	—	—	—	—	—	—	—	RIAA: Gold	Soul of a Woman
"Lean on Me" (Kirk Franklin featuring Mary J. Blige, Bono, R. Kelly, Crystal Lewis and The Family)	1998	79	26	—	—	—	57	27	—	—	—		The Nu Nation Project
"Satisfy You" (Puff Daddy featuring R. Kelly)	1999	2	1	31	19	2	4	—	38	6	8	RIAA: Gold; BPI: Silver; BVMI: Gold	Forever
"Contagious" (The Isley Brothers featuring R. Kelly and Chante Moore)	2001	19	6	—	—	—	—	—	—	—	—		Eternal
"Guilty Until Proven Innocent" (Jay-Z featuring R. Kelly)	2001	82	29	—	—	—	—	—	—	—	—		The Dynasty: Roc La Familia
"We Thuggin'" (Fat Joe featuring R. Kelly)	2001	15	5	37	—	70	—	—	—	—	48		Jealous Ones Still Envy (J.O.S.E.)
"Laundromat" (Nivea featuring R. Kelly)	2002	58	20	—	—	—	—	—	—	—	33		Nivea
"Clubbin'" (Marques Houston featuring Joe Budden and Pied Piper)	2003	39	12	—	—	—	—	—	—	—	15		MH
"What Would You Do?" (The Isley Brothers featuring R. Kelly)	2003	49	14	—	—	—	—	—	—	—	—		Body Kiss
"Rich Man" (Russell Hamilton featuring R. Kelly)	2003	— (Note: "Rich Man" did not enter the Billboard Hot 100, but peaked at number 41 on the Hot Singles Sales chart.)	— (Note: "Rich Man" did not enter the Hot R&B/Hip-Hop Songs chart, but peaked at number 16 on the Hot R&B/Hip-Hop Singles Sales chart.)	—	—	—	—	—	—	—	—		When I'm with You
"Gigolo" (Nick Cannon featuring R. Kelly)	2003	24	21	—	—	—	—	—	—	—	—		Nick Cannon
"Guess What (Guess Again)" (Remix) (Syleena Johnson featuring R. Kelly)	2003	—	75	—	—	—	—	—	—	—	—		Chapter 2: The Voice
"Calling All Girls" (ATL featuring R. Kelly)	2004	—	48	—	—	—	—	—	—	—	12		The ATL Project
"Hotel" (Cassidy featuring R. Kelly)	2004	4	6	25	—	22	70	—	24	28	3	BPI: Silver	Split Personality
"Gangsta Girl" (Big Tymers featuring R. Kelly)	2004	85	38	—	—	—	—	—	—	—	—		Big Money Heavyweight
"So Sexy" (Twista featuring R. Kelly)	2004	25	10	43	—	—	—	—	—	—	28		Kamikaze
"So Sexy: Chapter II (Like This)" (Twista featuring R. Kelly)	2004	92	47	—	—	—	—	—	—	—	—		Kamikaze
"Wonderful" (Ja Rule featuring R. Kelly and Ashanti)	2004	5	3	6	—	20	15	6	—	12	1	RIAA: Gold; ARIA: Gold; BPI: Silver	R.U.L.E.
"Magic Chick" (Do or Die featuring R. Kelly)	2005	—	— (Note: "Magic Chick" did not enter the Hot R&B/Hip-Hop Songs chart, but peaked at number 25 on the Bubbling Under R&B/Hip-Hop Singles chart.)	—	—	—	—	—	—	—	—		D.O.D.
"In Love with a Thug" (Sharissa featuring R. Kelly)	2005	—	—	—	—	—	—	—	—	—	—		Every Beat of My Heart
"Hypnotic" (Syleena Johnson featuring R. Kelly and Fabolous)	2005	—	81	—	—	—	—	—	—	—	—		Chapter 3: The Flesh
"Let's Make Love" (Deep Side featuring R. Kelly)	2006	—	—	—	—	—	—	—	—	—	—		Non-album single
"That's That" (Snoop Dogg featuring R. Kelly)	2006	20	9	64	30	39	73	18	55	37	38	RMNZ: Gold	Tha Blue Carpet Treatment
"Go Getta" (Young Jeezy featuring R. Kelly)	2007	18	9	—	—	—	—	—	—	—	—	RIAA: Platinum	The Inspiration
"Promise" (Go and Get Your Tickets Mix)" (Ciara featuring R. Kelly)	2007	—	—	—	—	—	—	—	—	—	—		Ciara: The Evolution
"I'm a Flirt" (Bow Wow featuring R. Kelly)	2007	12	2	—	—	—	—	—	—	—	—		The Price of Fame
"Make It Rain" (Remix) (Fat Joe featuring R. Kelly, T.I., Lil Wayne, Birdman, Rick Ross and Ace Mac)	2007	—	—	—	—	—	—	—	—	—	—		We the Best
"Speedin'" (Rick Ross featuring R. Kelly)	2007	— (Note: "Speedin'" did not enter the Billboard Hot 100, but peaked at number 21 on the Bubbling Under Hot 100 Singles chart.)	53	—	—	—	—	—	—	—	—		Trilla
"All the Above" (Beanie Sigel featuring R. Kelly)	2007	—	83	—	—	—	—	—	—	—	—		The Solution
"Out of This Club" (The Pussycat Dolls featuring R. Kelly and Polow da Don)	2008	—	— (Note: "Out of This Club" did not enter the Hot R&B/Hip-Hop Songs chart, but peaked at number 24 on the Bubbling Under R&B/Hip-Hop Singles chart.)	—	—	—	—	—	—	—	—		Doll Domination
"Ms. Chocolate" (Lil Jon featuring R. Kelly and Mario)	2010	—	77	—	—	—	—	—	—	—	—		Crunk Rock
"Platinum" (Snoop Dogg featuring R. Kelly)	2011	—	60	—	—	—	—	—	—	—	—		Doggumentary
"That's What We Do" (Ashanti featuring R. Kelly)	2012	—	—	—	—	—	—	—	—	—	—		Non-album single
"Throwin' My Money" (Twista featuring R. Kelly)	2013	—	—	—	—	—	—	—	—	—	—		Dark Horse
"We Been On" (Rich Gang featuring R. Kelly, Birdman and Lil Wayne)	2013	—	—	—	—	—	—	—	—	—	—		Rich Gang
"Do What U Want" (Lady Gaga featuring R. Kelly)	2013	13	—	21	8	14	27	12	17	14	9	RIAA: Platinum; ARIA: Platinum; BPI: Gold; BVMI: Gold; IFPI SWE: Platinum; RMNZ: Gold	Artpop
"PYD" (Justin Bieber featuring R. Kelly)	2013	54	13	56	62	64	19	—	—	27	30		Journals
"Make the World Go Round" (DJ Cassidy featuring R. Kelly)	2014	—	—	—	—	—	—	—	—	—	—		Paradise Royale
"It's Your World" (Jennifer Hudson featuring R. Kelly)	2014	—	— (Note: "It's Your World" did not enter the Hot R&B/Hip-Hop Songs chart, but peaked at number 35 on the R&B/Hip-Hop Airplay chart.)	—	—	—	—	—	—	—	—		JHUD
"Keep Doin' That (Rich Bitch)" (Rick Ross featuring R. Kelly)	2014	—	—	—	—	—	—	—	—	—	—		Hood Billionaire
"Dolo" (Kid Ink featuring R. Kelly)	2015	—	—	—	196	98	—	—	—	—	—		Full Speed
"Somewhere in Paradise" (Chance the Rapper featuring R. Kelly and Jeremih)	2015	—	—	—	—	—	—	—	—	—	—		Non-album singles
"Wanna Know" (Digital Farm Animals and Youthonix featuring R. Kelly)	2016	—	—	—	—	—	—	—	—	—	—		Non-album singles
"7 Squids" (SahBabii featuring R. Kelly)	2018	—	—	—	—	—	—	—	—	—	—		Non-album singles
"—" denotes a recording that did not chart or was not released in that territory.

=== Promotional singles ===
List of promotional singles, with selected chart positions, showing year released and album name
Title	Year	Peak chart positions		Album
Title	Year	US Bub.	US R&B	Album
"Fuck You Tonight" (The Notorious B.I.G. featuring R. Kelly)	1997	—	— (Note: "Fuck You Tonight" did not enter the Hot R&B/Hip-Hop Songs chart, but peaked at number 25 on the R&B/Hip-Hop Airplay chart.)	Life After Death
"Heaven I Need a Hug"	2002	4	26	Chocolate Factory
"I'll Never Leave"	2003	3	29	Chocolate Factory
"Peace"	2004	—	—	Happy People/U Saved Me
"Red Carpet (Pause, Flash)"	2004	7	31	Happy People/U Saved Me
"Double Up" (featuring Snoop Dogg)	2007	—	— (Note: "Double Up" did not enter the Hot R&B/Hip-Hop Songs chart, but peaked at number one on the Bubbling Under R&B/Hip-Hop Singles chart.)	Double Up
"Hair Braider"	2008	—	56	Non-album singles
"Skin"	2008	—	— (Note: "Skin" did not enter the Hot R&B/Hip-Hop Songs chart, but peaked at number ten on the Bubbling Under R&B/Hip-Hop Singles chart.)	Non-album singles
"Supaman High" (featuring OJ da Juiceman)	2009	—	46	Untitled
"Ignition (Viceroy Remix)" (with Viceroy)	2014	—	—	Non-album single
"Marching Band" (featuring Juicy J)	2015	—	—	The Buffet
"Wake Up Everybody"	2015	—	—	The Buffet
"Born to My Music"	2019	—	—	Non-album single
"—" denotes a recording that did not chart or was not released in that territory.

== Other charted songs ==
List of other charting songs, with selected chart positions, year released, and album name
Title	Year	Peak chart positions				Certifications	Album
Title	Year	US	US R&B	FRA	UK	Certifications	Album
"It Seems Like You're Ready"	1993	— (Note: "It Seems Like You're Ready" did not enter the Billboard Hot 100, but peaked at number 59 on the Hot 100 Airplay chart.)	— (Note: "It Seems Like You're Ready" did not enter the Hot R&B/Hip-Hop Songs chart, but peaked at number 21 on the R&B/Hip-Hop Airplay chart.)	—	—		12 Play
"For You"	1993	—	— (Note: "For You" did not enter the Hot R&B/Hip-Hop Songs chart, but peaked at number 58 on the R&B/Hip-Hop Airplay chart.)	—	—		12 Play
"Sadie"	1993	—	— (Note: "Sadie" did not enter the Hot R&B/Hip-Hop Songs chart, but peaked at number 56 on the R&B/Hip-Hop Airplay chart.)	—	—		12 Play
"Baby, Baby, Baby, Baby, Baby..."	1995	—	— (Note: "Baby, Baby, Baby, Baby, Baby..." did not enter the Hot R&B/Hip-Hop Songs chart, but peaked at number 28 on the R&B/Hip-Hop Airplay chart.)	—	—		R. Kelly
"You to Be (Be Happy)" (featuring The Notorious B.I.G.)	1995	—	— (Note: "You to Be (Be Happy)" did not enter the Hot R&B/Hip-Hop Songs chart, but peaked at number 46 on the R&B/Hip-Hop Airplay chart.)	—	—		R. Kelly
"Trade in My Life"	1995	—	— (Note: "Trade in My Life" did not enter the Hot R&B/Hip-Hop Songs chart, but peaked at number 50 on the R&B/Hip-Hop Airplay chart.)	—	—		R. Kelly
"It's On" (Mary J. Blige featuring R. Kelly)	1997	—	— (Note: "It's On" did not enter the Hot R&B/Hip-Hop Songs chart, but peaked at number 48 on the R&B/Hip-Hop Airplay chart.)	—	—		Share My World
"Spendin' Money"	1998	—	84	—	—		R.
"Don't Put Me Out"	1998	—	— (Note: "Don't Put Me Out" did not enter the Hot R&B/Hip-Hop Songs chart, but peaked at number 23 on the Bubbling Under R&B/Hip-Hop Singles chart.)	—	—		R.
"I Don't Mean It"	2001	—	73	—	—		TP-2.com
"Fiesta"	2001	—	53	—	—		TP-2.com
"The Greatest Sex"	2001	—	79	—	—		TP-2.com
"The Best of Both Worlds" (with Jay-Z)	2002	— (Note: "The Best of Both Worlds" did not enter the Billboard Hot 100, but peaked at number 15 on the Bubbling Under Hot 100 Singles chart.)	39	—	—		The Best of Both Worlds
"Somebody's Girl" (with Jay-Z)	2002	—	41	—	—		The Best of Both Worlds
"Shake Ya Body" (with Jay-Z, featuring Lil' Kim)	2002	—	72	—	—		The Best of Both Worlds
"More & More"	2002	—	— (Note: "More & More" did not enter the Hot R&B/Hip-Hop Songs chart, but peaked at number 20 on the Bubbling Under R&B/Hip-Hop Singles chart.)	—	—		Non-album song
"Step in the Name of Love"	2003	—	65	—	—		Chocolate Factory
"Heart of a Woman"	2003	—	— (Note: "Heart of a Woman" did not enter the Hot R&B/Hip-Hop Songs chart, but peaked at number 24 on the Bubbling Under R&B/Hip-Hop Singles chart.)	—	—		Chocolate Factory
"Forever"	2003	—	71	—	—		Chocolate Factory
"Ignition"	2003	—	— (Note: "Ignition" did not enter the Hot R&B/Hip-Hop Songs chart, but peaked at number three on the Bubbling Under R&B/Hip-Hop Singles chart.)	—	—		Chocolate Factory
"Who's That" (featuring Fat Joe)	2003	—	65	—	—		Chocolate Factory
"Pick Up the Phone" (with Ludacris and Tyrese)	2003	—	65	—	—		2 Fast 2 Furious soundtrack
"Touched a Dream"	2004	—	49	—	—		The R. in R&B Collection, Vol. 1
"I'm About to Get Her" (LL Cool J featuring R. Kelly)	2004	—	— (Note: "I'm About to Get Her" did not enter the Hot R&B/Hip-Hop Songs chart, but peaked at number nine on the Bubbling Under R&B/Hip-Hop Singles chart.)	—	—		The DEFinition
"Ladies Night (Treat Her Like Heaven)"	2004	—	— (Note: "Ladies Night (Treat Her Like Heaven)" did not enter the Hot R&B/Hip-Hop Songs chart, but peaked at number four on the Bubbling Under R&B/Hip-Hop Singles chart.)	—	—		Happy People/U Saved Me
"If"	2004	—	— (Note: "If" did not enter the Hot R&B/Hip-Hop Songs chart, but peaked at number 11 on the Bubbling Under R&B/Hip-Hop Singles chart.)	—	—		Happy People/U Saved Me
"Prayer Changes"	2004	—	— (Note: "Prayer Changes" did not enter the Hot R&B/Hip-Hop Songs chart, but peaked at number one on the Bubbling Under R&B/Hip-Hop Singles chart.)	—	—		Happy People/U Saved Me
"The Return" (with Jay-Z)	2004	—	— (Note: "The Return" did not enter the Hot R&B/Hip-Hop Songs chart, but peaked at number four on the Bubbling Under R&B/Hip-Hop Singles chart.)	—	—		Unfinished Business
"In the Club" (Lil Jon & The East Side Boyz featuring R. Kelly and Ludacris)	2004	—	— (Note: "In the Club" did not enter the Hot R&B/Hip-Hop Songs chart, but peaked at number seven on the Bubbling Under R&B/Hip-Hop Singles chart.)	—	—		Crunk Juice
"Happy Summertime" (featuring Snoop Dogg)	2005	—	— (Note: "Happy Summertime" did not enter the Hot R&B/Hip-Hop Songs chart, but peaked at number 19 on the Bubbling Under R&B/Hip-Hop Singles chart.)	—	—		TP.3 Reloaded
"Kickin' It with Your Girlfriend"	2005	—	— (Note: "Kickin' It with Your Girlfriend" did not enter the Hot R&B/Hip-Hop Songs chart, but peaked at number one on the Bubbling Under R&B/Hip-Hop Singles chart.)	—	—		TP.3 Reloaded
"Slow Wind" (Remix) (featuring Sean Paul and Akon)	2005	—	91	—	—		Remix City, Volume 1
"Mi Casa" (The Notorious B.I.G. featuring R. Kelly and Charlie Wilson)	2005	—	— (Note: "Mi Casa" did not enter the Hot R&B/Hip-Hop Songs chart, but peaked at number four on the Bubbling Under R&B/Hip-Hop Singles chart.)	—	—		Duets: The Final Chapter
"Don't Let Go"	2007	—	— (Note: "Don't Let Go" did not enter the Hot R&B/Hip-Hop Songs chart, but peaked at number eight on the Bubbling Under R&B/Hip-Hop Singles chart.)	—	—		Daddy's Little Girls soundtrack
"This Is Why I'm Cold" (Twista featuring R. Kelly and Speedknot Mobstaz)	2007	—	— (Note: "This Is Why I'm Cold" did not enter the Hot R&B/Hip-Hop Songs chart, but peaked at number 19 on the Bubbling Under R&B/Hip-Hop Singles chart.)	—	—		Non-album song
"Sex Planet"	2007	—	74	—	—		Double Up
"Freaky in the Club"	2008	—	— (Note: "Freaky in the Club" did not enter the Hot R&B/Hip-Hop Songs chart, but peaked at number 24 on the Bubbling Under R&B/Hip-Hop Singles chart.)	—	—		Double Up
"Yellow Light" (Twista featuring R. Kelly)	2009	—	— (Note: "Yellow Light" did not enter the Hot R&B/Hip-Hop Songs chart, but peaked at number seven on the Bubbling Under R&B/Hip-Hop Singles chart.)	—	—		Category F5
"Crazy Night" (featuring Rock City)	2009	—	— (Note: "Crazy Night" did not enter the Hot R&B/Hip-Hop Songs chart, but peaked at number seven on the Bubbling Under R&B/Hip-Hop Singles chart.)	—	—		Untitled
"Exit"	2009	—	— (Note: "Exit" did not enter the Hot R&B/Hip-Hop Songs chart, but peaked at number 20 on the Bubbling Under R&B/Hip-Hop Singles chart.)	—	—		Untitled
"Tongues" (featuring Ludacris)	2010	—	— (Note: "Tongues" did not enter the Hot R&B/Hip-Hop Songs chart, but peaked at number ten on the Bubbling Under R&B/Hip-Hop Singles chart.)	—	—		Non-album song
"Just Like That"	2011	—	70	—	—		Love Letter
"Just Can't Get Enough"	2011	—	— (Note: "Just Can't Get Enough" did not enter the Hot R&B/Hip-Hop Songs chart, but peaked at number 12 on the Bubbling Under R&B/Hip-Hop Singles chart.)	—	—		Love Letter
"Green Light"	2012	—	77	—	—		Write Me Back
"To the World" (with Kanye West and Teyana Taylor)	2012	70	35	161	94		Cruel Summer
"Drown in It" (Chris Brown featuring R. Kelly)	2014	—	— (Note: "Drown in It" did not enter the Hot R&B/Hip-Hop Songs chart, but peaked at number seven on the Bubbling Under R&B/Hip-Hop Singles chart.)	—	—		X
"Let Me Love You" (R. Kelly Remix) (with DJ Snake)	2016	— (Note: "Let Me Love You" did not enter the Billboard Hot 100, but peaked at number 24 on the Bubbling Under Hot 100 Singles chart.)	—	—	—		Non-album song
"Juicy Booty" (Chris Brown featuring Jhené Aiko and R. Kelly)	2017	—	— (Note: "Juicy Booty" did not enter the Hot R&B/Hip-Hop Songs chart, but peaked at number five on the Bubbling Under R&B/Hip-Hop Singles chart.)	—	—	RMNZ: Gold	Heartbreak on a Full Moon
"—" denotes a recording that did not chart or was not released in that territory.

== Guest appearances ==
List of non-single guest appearances, with other performer(s), year, and album
Title	Year	Other performer(s)	Album
"Back & Forth" (Remix)	1994	Aaliyah, Mr. Lee	Age Ain't Nothing but a Number
"Homie, Lover, Friend" (Looking for My Homie Mix)	1994	—N/a	A Low Down Dirty Shame (soundtrack)
"Heaven Girl"	1995	Quincy Jones, R&B Guys	Q's Jook Joint
"Freak Tonight"	1996	—N/a	A Thin Line Between Love and Hate (soundtrack)
"Be My Lady"	1996	Whodini	Six
"Fuck You Tonight"	1997	The Notorious B.I.G.	Life After Death
"It's On"	1997	Mary J. Blige	Share My World
"Ghetto Queen"	1998	Crucial Conflict	Good Side, Bad Side
"It's Like Everyday"	1999	DJ Quik	Life (soundtrack)
"It's All Good"	1999	—N/a	The Wood (soundtrack)
"National Anthem"	2000	Kelly Price	Mirror Mirror
"Just a Touch"	2000	—N/a	Nutty Professor II: The Klumps (soundtrack)
"Up and Outta Here"	2000	—N/a	Shaft (soundtrack)
Take My Time Tonight	2001	—N/a	The Fast and the Furious (soundtrack)
"We Thuggin'" (Remix)	2001	Fat Joe, N.O.R.E., Busta Rhymes, Remy Ma	Jealous Ones Still Envy (J.O.S.E.)
"Addicted" (Remix)	2002	Truth Hurts	—N/a
"Pick Up the Phone"	2003	Ludacris, Tyrese	2 Fast 2 Furious (soundtrack)
"Hell Yeah" (Remix)	2003	Ginuwine, Birdman, The Clipse	The Senior
"That Girl" (Remix)	2003	Marques Houston	MH
"Baby I Love You!" (Remix)	2003	Jennifer Lopez	—N/a
"Ghetto Religion"	2003	Wyclef Jean	Greatest Hits
"Dear Ghetto"	2003	Boo & Gotti	Perfect Timing
"Dats What I'm Talkin About"	2003	Missy Elliott	This Is Not a Test!
"Next to You"	2004	Ciara	Goodies
"Leave wit Me"	2004	Chingy	Powerballin'
"I'm About to Get Her"	2004	LL Cool J	The DEFinition
"Lady Lady"	2004	Mannie Fresh, Lil Wayne	The Mind of Mannie Fresh
"In da Club"	2004	Lil Jon & Boyz, Ludacris	Crunk Juice
"Gangsta Girl"	2005	Nivea	Complicated
"So Hot"	2005	Fat Joe	All or Nothing
"Mi Casa"	2005	Biggie, Charlie Wilson	Duets: The Final Chapter
"Woozy"	2006	Ludacris	Release Therapy
"Promise (Go and Get Your Tickets Mix)"	2006	Ciara	Ciara: The Evolution
"It's Me...(Remix)"	2007	Swizz Beatz, Lil Wayne, Jadakiss	One Man Band Man
"Love Rehab"	2007	Twista	Adrenaline Rush 2007
"Ucud Gedit"	2008	Nelly, Gucci Mane	Brass Knuckles
"Yellow Light"	2009	Twista	Category F5
"Could've Been You"	2009	50 Cent	Before I Self Destruct
"World Cry"	2011	Lloyd, Keri Hilson, K'naan	King of Hearts
"Center of the Stage"	2011	T-Pain, Bei Maejor	Revolver
"Till the World Ends" (Remix)	2011	Britney Spears	—N/a
"To the World"	2012	Kanye West, Teyana Taylor	Cruel Summer
"When She Hates Her Man"	2012	Mark Morrison	I Am What I Am
"Parachute"	2012	Future	Pluto
"Sick of This Shit"	2012	Trae Tha Truth	Tha Blackprint
"Can You Learn"	2012	T.I.	Trouble Man: Heavy Is the Head
"Representin (Remix)"	2013	Ludacris, Fabolous	—N/a
"Trying to Be Cool (Remix)"	2013	Phoenix	—N/a
"Gorilla (G-Mix)"	2013	Bruno Mars, Pharrell	—N/a
"Betcha Gon' Know"	2014	Mariah Carey	Me. I Am Mariah... The Elusive Chanteuse
"Drown in It"	2014	Chris Brown	X
"Glory to the Lord"	2015	King Los	God, Money, War
"Put the Guns Down"	2015	Tink	Chi-Raq (soundtrack)
"Actress"	2015	Ty Dolla Sign	Free TC
"Back to Sleep (Legends Remix)"	2016	Chris Brown, Tank, Anthony Hamilton	—N/a
"Dedicated"	2017	Pitbull, Austin Mahone	Climate Change
"Juicy Booty"	2017	Chris Brown, Jhené Aiko	Heartbreak on a Full Moon
"IF" (Remix)	2017	Davido	—N/a
"Bananas in That Monkey"	2018	John Blu	—N/a
"Residuals" (Remix)	2025	—N/a	—N/a

== Filmography ==
=== Television ===
Year	Title	Role(s)	Notes
1990	Big Break	Himself	Contestant, 1st place
2004	Fade to Black	Himself	Documentary
2005	Trapped in the Closet Chapters 1-12	Sylvester	Lead Role, Director and Producer
2006	Live The Light It Up Tour	Himself	
2007	Trapped in the Closet Chapters 13-22	Sylvester, Pimp Lucius, Rev. Mosley James Evans	Lead Role, Director and Producer
2007	Trapped in the Closet. The BIG Package	Sylvester, Pimp Lucius, Rev. Mosley James Evans	Lead Role, Director and Producer
2011	R. Kelly Sings Sam Cooke: Live at the Five Star!	Himself	
2011	The One8 Project: Hands Across the World	Himself	Documentary
2012	Trapped in the Closet: The Next Installment	Sylvester, Pimp Lucius, Beeno, Rev. Mosley James Evans, Dr. Perry	Lead Role, Director and Producer
2012	Love Letter Concert	Himself	
2012	R. Kelly: The King Lives	Himself	Documentary
