= R. Kelly videography =

R. Kelly video discography
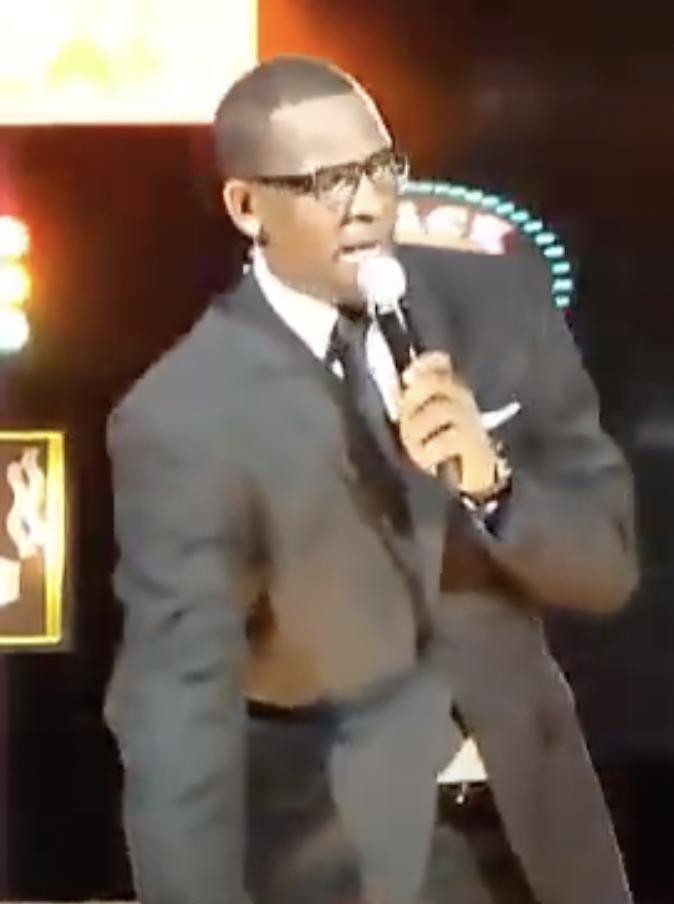
- R. Kelly in 2011
- Music videos: 60
- Featured music videos: 30
- Cameo appearances: 7
- Commercials: 1

The videography of American singer R. Kelly, consists of 90 music videos (60 as a lead artist and 30 as a featured artist), 7 cameo appearances, and 1 commercial.

== Music videos ==
Key
†	Indicates unreleased music videos

=== 1990s ===
==== As a lead artist ====
Year	Music video	Director(s)
1990	"Why You Wanna Play Me?" (with MGM)	Unknown
1991	"She's Got That Vibe" (with Public Announcement)	R. Kelly
1992	"Honey Love" (with Public Announcement)	Lionel C. Martin
1992	"Slow Dance (Hey Mr. DJ)" (with Public Announcement)	Unknown
1993	"Dedicated" (with Public Announcement)	Lionel C. Martin
1993	"Sex Me"	Kim Watson
1993	"Sex Me (Part II)"	Kim Watson
1994	"Bump n' Grind"	Kim Watson
1994	"Your Body's Callin'"	Millicent Shelton
1994	"Summer Bunnies" (Remix) (featuring Aaliyah)	Unknown
1995	"You Remind Me of Something"	David Nelson
1996	"Down Low (Nobody Has to Know)" (featuring The Isley Brothers)	R. Kelly & Hype Williams
1996	"Down Low (Nobody Has to Know)" (Live to Regret It Remix) (featuring Ronald Isley)	R. Kelly & Hype Williams
1996	"Thank God It's Friday"	Hype Williams
1996	"I Can't Sleep Baby (If I)"	Hype Williams
1996	"I Can't Sleep Baby (If I)" (Remix)	Hype Williams
1996	"I Believe I Can Fly"	R. Kelly & Hype Williams
1997	"Gotham City"	Hype Williams
1997	"Gotham City" (Remix)	Hype Williams
1998	"Half on a Baby"	Hype Williams
1998	"Home Alone" (featuring Keith Murray)	Hype Williams
1998	"I'm Your Angel" (with Celine Dion)	Bille Woodruff
1998	"When a Woman's Fed Up"	R. Kelly
1999	"Did You Ever Think" (Remix) (featuring Nas)	R. Kelly & Bille Woodruff
1999	"If I Could Turn Back the Hands of Time"	F. Gary Gray

==== As a featured artist ====
Year	Music video	Director(s)
1993	"Payday" (The Winans featuring R. Kelly)	Unknown
1994	"At Your Best (You Are Love)" (Remix) (Aaliyah featuring R. Kelly)	Millicent Shelton
1994	"U Will Know" (Black Men United)	Unknown
1996	"Street Dreams" (Remix) (Nas featuring R. Kelly)	Hype Williams
1997	"All of My Days" (Changing Faces featuring Jay-Z and R. Kelly)	Cameron Casey
1998	"Be Careful" (Sparkle featuring R. Kelly)	R. Kelly
1998	"Friend of Mine" (Remix) (Kelly Price featuring R. Kelly)	Hype Williams
1998	"Lean on Me" (Kirk Franklin's Nu Nation featuring R. Kelly)	Mark Gerald
1999	"Satisfy You" (Puff Daddy featuring R. Kelly)	Hype Williams

==== Cameo appearances ====
Year	Music video	Director(s)
1994	"Back & Forth" Aaliyah	Millicent Shelton
1994	"Stroke You Up" Changing Faces	Unknown
1996	"Let's Lay Together" The Isley Brothers	Hype Williams
1998	"Time to Move On" Sparkle	R. Kelly

=== 2000s ===
==== As a lead artist ====
Year	Music video	Director(s)
2000	"Bad Man"	Hype Williams
2000	"I Wish"	R. Kelly & Christopher Erskin
2000	"I Wish (To the Homies That We Lost)" (featuring Boo & Gotti)	R. Kelly
2001	"The Storm Is Over Now"	R. Kelly & Bille Woodruff
2001	"Fiesta (Remix)" (featuring Jay-Z & Boo & Gotti)	R. Kelly & Little X.
2001	"Feelin' on Yo Booty"	Bille Woodruff
2001	"A Woman's Threat"	R. Kelly
2002	"The World's Greatest"	Bille Woodruff
2003	"Ignition (Remix)"	Bille Woodruff
2003	"Snake" (featuring Big Tigger)	Little X.
2003	"Snake" (Remix) (featuring Cam'ron)	Little X.
2003	"Step in the Name of Love" (Remix)	Little X.
2003	"Thoia Thoing"	Little X.
2003	"Soldier's Heart"	Unknown
2004	"Happy People"	Little X.
2004	"U Saved Me"	Julien Christian Lutz
2005	"Playa's Only" (featuring The Game)	Little X.
2005	"Slow Wind"	Little X.
2005	"Burn It Up" (featuring Wisin & Yandel)	Bille Woodruff & R. Kelly
2007	"I'm a Flirt (Remix)" (featuring T.I. and T-Pain)	Benny Boom
2007	"Same Girl" (with Usher)	Little X.
2007	"Rock Star" (featuring Ludacris and Kid Rock)	R. Kelly & Elliot Rosenblatt
2008	"Hair Braider"	R. Malcolm Jones
2008	"Skin"	Anthony Mandler
2009	"Number One" (featuring Keri Hilson)	Chris Robinson
2009	"Be My #2"	Jim Swaffield
2009	"Echo"	Jim Swaffield

==== As a featured artist ====
Year	Music video	Director(s)
2001	"Contagious" (The Isley Brothers featuring R. Kelly and Chanté Moore)	R. Kelly & Bille Woodruff
2001	"Guilty Until Proven Innocent" (Jay-Z featuring R. Kelly)	Paul Hunter
2001	"We Thuggin'" (Fat Joe featuring R. Kelly)	Bille Woodruff
2003	"What Would You Do?'" (The Isley Brothers featuring R. Kelly)	Bille Woodruff
2003	"Gigolo" (Nick Cannon featuring R. Kelly)	Erik White
2004	"Hotel" (Cassidy featuring R. Kelly)	Little X.
2004	"Gangsta Girl" (Big Tymers featuring R. Kelly)	Unknown
2004	"So Sexy" (Twista featuring R. Kelly)	Marcus Raboy
2004	"So Sexy: Chapter II (Like This)" (Twista featuring R. Kelly)	Marcus Raboy
2004	"Wonderful" (Ja Rule featuring R. Kelly and Ashanti)	Hype Williams
2005	"Magic Chick" (Do or Die featuring R. Kelly)	President Thomas Forbes
2005	"In Love with a Thug" (Sharissa featuring R. Kelly)	Unknown
2006	"That's That Shit" (Snoop Dogg featuring R. Kelly)	Benny Boom
2006	"I'm 'n Luv (Wit a Stripper) 2 – Tha Remix" (T-Pain featuring Too Short, MJG, Paul Wall, Twista, Pimp C and R. Kelly)	Max Nichols
2007	"Make It Rain" (Remix) (Fat Joe featuring R. Kelly, T.I., Lil Wayne, Birdman, Rick Ross and Ace Mac)	R. Malcolm Jones
2007	"Go Getta" (Young Jeezy featuring R. Kelly)	Chris Robinson
2007	"Speedin'" (Rick Ross featuring R. Kelly)	Gil Green
2007	"All the Above" (Beanie Sigel featuring R. Kelly)	Jessy Terrero

==== Cameo appearances ====
Year	Music video	Director(s)
2001	"Bitter" (Chanté Moore)	Aaron Courseault
2003	"Busted" (The Isley Brothers featuring JS)	Bille Woodruff
2003	"Love Angel" (JS)	Unknown

=== 2010s ===
==== As a lead artist ====
Year	Music video	Director(s)
2010	"Sign of a Victory"	Jim Swaffield
2010	"When a Woman Loves"	R. Kelly, Jeremy Rall
2011	"Radio Message"	R. Kelly, Jeremy Rall
2012	"Share My Love"	Little X.
2012	"It's On" (featuring DJ Khaled and Ace Hood)	R. Kelly, Devin DeHaven
2012	"Feelin' Single"	Benny Boom
2013	"My Story" (featuring 2 Chainz)	Jim Swaffield
2013	"Fuck Y'all"†	G. Visuals
2013	"Throw This Money On You"†	G. Visuals
2013	"Cookie"	Alex Nazari
2015	"Happy Birthday"	Jim Swaffield
2015	"Backyard Party"	Unknown

==== As a featured artist ====
Year	Music video	Director(s)
2010	"Ms. Chocolate" (Lil Jon featuring R. Kelly and Mario)	Unknown
2013	"We Been On" (Rich Gang featuring R. Kelly, Birdman and Lil Wayne)	Hannah Lux Davis
2013	"Do What U Want" (Lady Gaga featuring R. Kelly)†	Terry Richardson
2014	"Make the World Go Round" (DJ Cassidy featuring R. Kelly)	Little X.
2014	"Keep Doin' That (Rich Bitch)" (Rick Ross featuring R. Kelly)	DRE Films

== Video albums ==
List of DVDs, with sales and certifications
Title	Album details	Sales	Certifications
The R. in R&B – The Video Collection	Released: September 23, 2003; Formats: DVD; Label: Jive	US: 100,000	RIAA: Platinum
Trapped in the Closet: Chapters 1–12	Released: October 1, 2005; Formats: DVD; Label: Jive, Zomba	US: 200,000	RIAA: 2× Platinum
R. Kelly Light It Up Tour Live	Released: March 20, 2007; Formats: DVD; Label: Jive		
Trapped in the Closet: Chapters 13–22	Released: August 21, 2007; Formats: DVD; Label: Jive, Zomba	US: 100,000	RIAA: Platinum
Trapped in the Closet: The BIG Package	Released: December 2007; Formats: CD; Label: Jive, Zomba		
Trapped in the Closet: Chapters 23–33	Released: February 13, 2013; Formats: Digital download; Label: RCA, Zomba		

== Filmography ==
This is a chronologically-ordered list of films and television shows in which R. Kelly has appeared.

=== Films ===
Year	Title	Role(s)	Notes
1990	Big Break	Himself	Contestant, 1st place
2002	Slip N Slide: All Star Weekend	Himself	
2004	Fade to Black	Himself	Documentary
2004	R. Kelly: The Pied Piper of R&B	Himself	Documentary
2005	Trapped in the Closet Chapters 1-12	Sylvester	Lead Role, Co-Director with Jim Swaffield
2006	Live The Light It Up Tour	Himself	
2006	Snakes on a Plane	Passenger	Uncredited
2007	Trapped in the Closet Chapters 13–22	Sylvester, Pimp Lucius, Rev. Mosley James Evans	Lead Role, Co-Director with Jim Swaffield
2007	Trapped in the Closet. The BIG Package	Sylvester, Pimp Lucius, Rev. Mosley James Evans	Lead Role, Co-Director with Jim Swaffield
2011	R. Kelly Sings Sam Cooke: Live at the Five Star!	Himself	
2011	The One8 Project: Hands Across the World	Himself	Documentary Directed by Jim Swaffield
2012	Trapped in the Closet: The Next Installment	Sylvester, Pimp Lucius, Beeno, Rev. Mosley James Evans, Dr. Perry	Lead Role, Co-Director with Jim Swaffield
2012	Love Letter Concert	Himself	Directed by Jim Swaffield
2012	R. Kelly: The King Lives	Himself	Documentary
2019	Surviving R. Kelly	Himself	
2021	R. Kelly: The Verdict	Himself	Documentary

=== Commercials ===
Year	Company	Description
2002	Reebok	R. Kelly starred in the first ad for Reebok's "Sounds & Rhythm of Sport" global ad campaign.
