= Remix City, Volume 1 =

Remix City Volume 1

Remix album by R. Kelly
- Released: November 15, 2005 (US)
- Recorded: 1991–2005
- Genre: R&B
- Length: 60 min
- Label: Jive Records/Zomba Label Group
- Producer: R. Kelly

R. Kelly chronology
My Diary (2005)	Remix City Volume 1 (2005)	Double Up (2007)

Professional ratings
Review scores
Source	Rating
Allmusic	link

Remix City, Volume 1 is a remix album by American R&B singer, R. Kelly & it was released on November 15, 2005, through Jive Records and Zomba Label Group. Unlike Kelly's first greatest hits release, The R. in R&B Collection, Vol. 1 (2003), this album features remixed versions of his greatest hits.

== Track listing ==
1. Slow Dance (Hey Mr. DJ) / After The Party's Over (Singin' Remix) (R. Kelly, T. Blatcher, M. Jefferson)
2. Sex Me (Part II) (Extended Street Version) (R. Kelly)
3. Bump n' Grind (Old School Mix) (R. Kelly)
4. Your Body's Callin' (His & Hers Extended Remix) (featuring Aaliyah) (R. Kelly)
5. I Can't Sleep Baby (If I) (Remix Radio Version) (R. Kelly)
6. Down Low (Nobody Has To Know) (Live To Regret It/Blame It On The Mo Mix) [featuring Ronald Isley] (R. Kelly)
7. I Wish (To The Homies That We Lost Remix) [featuring Boo & Gotti] (R. Kelly)
8. Feelin' On Yo Booty (Hypnosis Mix) (R. Kelly)
9. I Mean (I Don't Mean It) (R. Kelly)
10. Ignition (Remix) (R. Kelly)
11. Step In The Name Of Love (Remix) (R. Kelly)
12. Slow Wind (Remix) (featuring Sean Paul & Akon) (R. Kelly, S.P. Henriques, A. Thiam)
13. Burn It Up (Remix) (featuring Fat Joe, Wisin & Yandel) (R. Kelly, F. Saldana, V. Cabrera, Wisin & Yandel, J. Cartagena)
14. Feelin' On Yo Booty (Dirty South Mix) (featuring YoungBloodZ) (R. Kelly, S. Joseph, J. Grigsby)
