= Playlist: The Very Best of R. Kelly =

Greatest hits album by R. Kelly
- Released: June 1, 2010
- Recorded: 1993–2009
- Genre: R&B
- Length: 58:41
- Label: Legacy

R. Kelly chronology
Untitled (2009)	Playlist: The Very Best of R. Kelly (2010)	I Believe I Can Fly: The Best of R.Kelly (2010)

Playlist: The Very Best of R. Kelly is a compilation album by American R&B singer R. Kelly. The album features some of Kelly's released and unreleased songs (as singles) over the course of his career. It peaked at number 60 on the Billboard's Top R&B/Hip Hop Albums chart.

== Track list ==
1. "I Believe"
2. "Step in the Name of Love" (Remix)
3. "I Wish" (To the Homies That We Lost Remix)
4. "Your Body's Callin'"
5. "Same Girl" (with Usher)
6. "I Believe I Can Fly"
7. "Hair Braider"
8. "Bump n' Grind" (Old School Mix)
9. "Happy People"
10. "Ignition (Remix)"
11. "Supaman High" (featuring OJ da Juiceman)
12. "When a Woman's Fed Up"
13. "The World's Greatest"
14. "Religious"
