= Tha Bizness =

American hip hop group

- Origin: Seattle, Washington, U.S. Los Angeles, California, U.S. Atlanta, Georgia, U.S.
- Genres: Hip hop; R&B
- Years active: 2004–present
- Label: Tha Bizness Productions LLC.
- Members: Dow Jones; Henny
- Website: www.thabizness.com

Tha Bizness is an American record production and songwriting duo from Seattle, Washington, composed of Justin "Henny" Henderson and Christopher John "Dow Jones" Whitacre. Tha Bizness have produced songs for several prominent artists, including Chris Brown, Ne-Yo, Jay-Z, Snoop Dogg, Nas, 8Ball & MJG, Ice Cube, 50 Cent, and Kendrick Lamar, among others. In 2009, they received a Producer of the Year nomination at the BET Hip Hop Awards.

== History ==
Henny, who was previously a singer under the name "J Henn," and Dow Jones, who was previously a mixtape DJ, joined forces to form the production team "Tha Bizness." Dow used his mixtape series, titled "Play Your Position," to promote their beats. Eventually, they were noticed by West Coast artists, for whom they produced songs for mixtapes. In 2007, Sha Money XL contacted the duo via Myspace and offered the duo a production deal with G-Unit Records and Sha Money's management team, Teamwork Music.

Tha Bizness achieved mainstream success with the production of "Every Girl" from Young Money's 2009 album "We Are Young Money." The instrumental was originally intended to be for R. Kelly, for whom Tha Bizness had previously collaborated on "Hair Braider" in early 2008, but Lil Wayne heard the beat and bought it first. Tha Bizness also produced another song on the same album, titled "Ms. Parker."

== Production discography ==
=== Singles produced ===
List of List of singles as producers, with selected chart positions and certifications, showing year released, performing artists and album name
Title	Year	Peak chart positions						Certifications	Album
Title	Year	US	US R&B	US Rap	US Pop	AUS	UK	Certifications	Album
"Wadsyaname" (Nelly)	2007	43	—	—	—	—	—	RMNZ: Gold	
"My President" (Young Jeezy featuring Nas)	2008	53	45	13	—	—	—	RIAA: Platinum	The Recession
"Hair Braider" (R. Kelly)	2008	—	56	—	—	—	—		12 Play: 4th Quarter
"Boyfriend #2" (Pleasure P)	2008	42	2	—	—	—	—		The Introduction of Marcus Cooper
"Every Girl" (Young Money)	2009	10	2	2	40	—	—	RIAA: Gold	We Are Young Money
"Money Round Here" (C-Ride featuring T-Pain)	2009	—	56	—	—	—	—		Best from the Crib
"No Bullshit" (Chris Brown)	2011	62	3	—	—	—	—	RIAA: Gold	Fan of a Fan and F.A.M.E.
"Strip" (Chris Brown featuring Kevin McCall)	2011	37	3	—	—	76	78	RIAA: 2× Platinum; ARIA: Platinum	Boy In Detention and Fortune
"Wildest Dreams" (Brandy)	2012	—	68	—	—	—	—		Two Eleven
"—" denotes items which were not released in that country or failed to chart.
