= List of Billboard 200 number-one albums of 2000 =

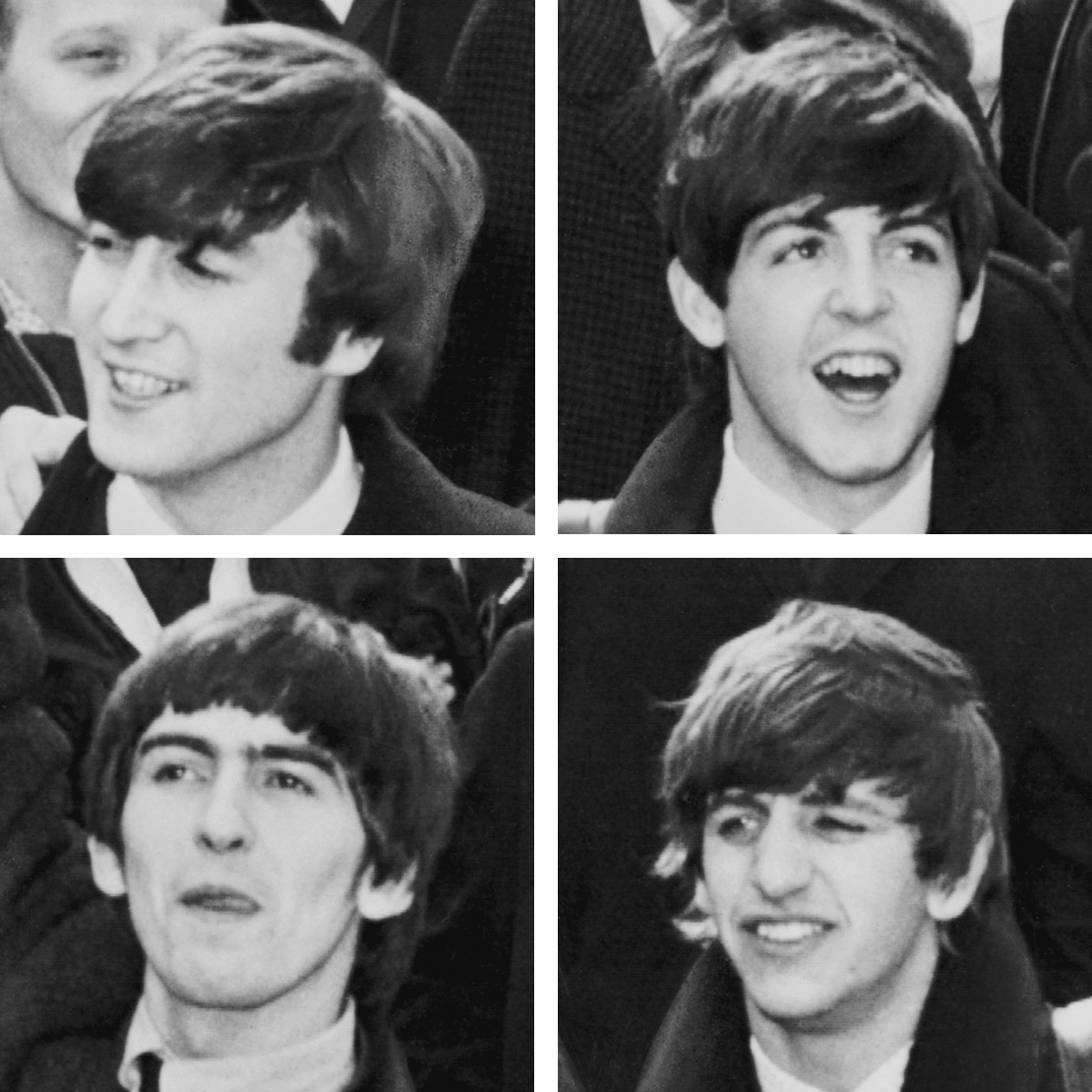
English rock band The Beatles' compilation album 1 is one of the three longest-running albums of 2000, topping the Billboard 200 for eight weeks non-consecutively.

The highest-selling albums and EPs in the United States are ranked in the Billboard 200, published by Billboard magazine. The date are compiled by Nielsen Soundscan based on each album's weekly physical sales. In 2000, 20 albums topped the chart in 53 issues of the magazine, but two of which albums started their peak position in 1999 and are therefore excluded.

Pop group NSYNC's No Strings Attached, rapper Eminem's The Marshall Mathers LP, and rock group The Beatles' compilation album 1 are the longest-running albums of 2000 and second in 2000s, behind Taylor Swift in 2009 with Fearless which logged eleven non-consecutive weeks at number one. The first two of which albums topped the Billboard 200 for eight straight weeks. 1 charted for eight non-consecutive weeks, of which stretch began in late 2000 and continued in early 2001. No Strings Attached, The Marshall Mathers LP, and 1 are credited as three of the longest-running albums of the decade. Rock artist Santana's Supernatural topped the chart for nine non-consecutive weeks in 2000, but is credited as the longest-running album of 1999 because it first peaked in that year.

No Strings Attached is the best-selling album of 2000, accumulating nearly 9.94 million sales by the end of the year. The album was noted for its debut sales figure of 2.4 million, the highest first-week sales in the Billboard 200 history. The figure marked as the only album to have sold more than two million copies in a one-week period, a distinction held until the release of Adele's 25. Rapper Eminem's The Marshall Mathers LP sold over 7.92 million copies, the second best-selling album of 2000. The album's debut sales, over 1.76 million, held the distinction as the second best sales in a week. Singer Britney Spears's Oops!... I Did It Again sold nearly 7.89 million copies, making it the third highest-selling album of the year. The album opened at number one on the Billboard 200 on the strength of over 1.3 million unit sales, breaking the record for first-week sales by a female act. Debut sales of Oops!... I Did It Again broke the record set by singer Alanis Morissette's Supposed Former Infatuation Junkie, which opened with 469,054 sales. It also shattered singer Mariah Carey's record, whose album Daydream sold 759,959 copies during the week of Christmas 1995. Band Backstreet Boys' Black & Blue sold 1.6 million units in its debut week, besting their album Millennium's figure of 1.13 million.

2000 had the fewest Billboard 200 leaders among women since 1996, with only Britney Spears, Celine Dion and Madonna having a number one album this year.

== Chart history ==
Key
†	Indicates best performing album of 2000

Issue date	Album	Artist(s)	Sales	Ref.
January 1	All the Way... A Decade of Song	Celine Dion	537,000	
January 8	...And Then There Was X	DMX	698,000	
January 15	Vol. 3: Life and Times of S. Carter	Jay-Z	462,000	
January 22	Supernatural	Santana	204,000	
January 29	Supernatural	Santana	174,100	
February 5	Supernatural	Santana	199,500	
February 12	Voodoo	D'Angelo	321,100	
February 19	Voodoo	D'Angelo	190,900	
February 26	Supernatural	Santana	217,100	
March 4	Supernatural	Santana	219,000	
March 11	Supernatural	Santana	583,000	
March 18	Supernatural	Santana	441,000	
March 25	Supernatural	Santana	343,300	
April 1	Supernatural	Santana	307,000	
April 8	No Strings Attached †	NSYNC	2,415,900	
April 15	No Strings Attached †	NSYNC	811,300	
April 22	No Strings Attached †	NSYNC	533,000	
April 29	No Strings Attached †	NSYNC	422,000	
May 6	No Strings Attached †	NSYNC	654,600	
May 13	No Strings Attached †	NSYNC	248,000	
May 20	No Strings Attached †	NSYNC	191,000	
May 27	No Strings Attached †	NSYNC	188,200	
June 3	Oops!... I Did It Again	Britney Spears	1,319,200	
June 10	The Marshall Mathers LP	Eminem	1,760,100	
June 17	The Marshall Mathers LP	Eminem	793,800	
June 24	The Marshall Mathers LP	Eminem	598,000	
July 1	The Marshall Mathers LP	Eminem	519,000	
July 8	The Marshall Mathers LP	Eminem	409,400	
July 15	The Marshall Mathers LP	Eminem	341,000	
July 22	The Marshall Mathers LP	Eminem	290,600	
July 29	The Marshall Mathers LP	Eminem	257,000	
August 5	Now 4	Various Artists	320,000	
August 12	Now 4	Various Artists	258,200	
August 19	Now 4	Various Artists	239,500	
August 26	Country Grammar	Nelly	234,000	
September 2	Country Grammar	Nelly	235,000	
September 9	Country Grammar	Nelly	213,500	
September 16	Country Grammar	Nelly	200,000	
September 23	Country Grammar	Nelly	191,600	
September 30	G.O.A.T.	LL Cool J	208,700	
October 7	Music	Madonna	419,600	
October 14	Let's Get Ready	Mystikal	330,700	
October 21	Kid A	Radiohead	207,400	
October 28	Rule 3:36	Ja Rule	275,000	
November 4	Chocolate Starfish and the Hot Dog Flavored Water	Limp Bizkit	1,054,500	
November 11	Chocolate Starfish and the Hot Dog Flavored Water	Limp Bizkit	392,000	
November 18	The Dynasty: Roc La Familia	Jay-Z	557,800	
November 25	TP-2.com	R. Kelly	543,300	
December 2	1	The Beatles	594,700	
December 9	Black & Blue	Backstreet Boys	1,591,200	
December 16	Black & Blue	Backstreet Boys	689,600	
December 23	1	The Beatles	670,700	
December 30	1	The Beatles	823,600	

== See also ==
- 2000 in music
- Lists of Billboard 200 number-one albums
