= Hardball (soundtrack) =

2001 soundtrack album by various artists

Music from the Motion Picture Hardball

Soundtrack album by Various artists
- Released: September 11, 2001
- Recorded: 2001
- Studio: SouthSide Studios (Atlanta, Georgia); Battery Studios (New York City, New York); Quad Recording Studios (Times Square, New York); The Hit Factory (New York City, New York); Infinite Studios (Alameda, California); Rockland Studios (Chicago, Illinois); Sound On Sound (New York City, New York); Cash Money Studios
- Genre: Hip hop; R&B
- Length: 47:16
- Label: So So Def; Columbia; Sony Music Soundtrax
- Producer: Brian Robbins (exec.); Michael McQuarn (exec.); Michael Tollin (exec.); Sharla Sumpter (exec.); Michael T. Mauldin (exec.); Jermaine Dupri (also exec.); Bink!; Chucky Thompson; Havoc; Mannie Fresh; Rick Rock; R. Kelly; Sean Combs; Steven Estiverne; Wirlie Morris; Bryan-Michael Cox; LaMarquis Jefferson

Singles from Hardball
- 1. "The Storm Is Over Now" Released: April 3, 2001; 2. "Hardball" Released: 2001

Professional ratings
Review scores
Source	Rating
AllMusic	2/5 stars
HipHopDX	4/5 stars

Music from the Motion Picture Hardball is the soundtrack to Brian Robbins' 2001 film Hardball. It was released on September 11, 2001 through Columbia Records and consisted of hip hop and R&B music. The album reached number 55 on the Billboard 200, number 34 on the Top R&B/Hip-Hop Albums chart, and number 4 on the Top Soundtracks chart. The title track was released as a single and peaked at No. 77 on the Billboard Hot R&B/Hip-Hop Singles & Tracks chart.

== Track listing ==
No.	Title	Writer(s)	Producer(s)	Length
1.	"Intro (Live the Life)" (Fundisha and Jermaine Dupri)	Jermaine Dupri; Fundisha Johnson		0:22
2.	"Hardball" (Lil' Bow Wow, Lil' Wayne, Lil' Zane and Sammie)	Jermaine Dupri; Dwayne Michael Carter, Jr.; Zane Copeland, Jr.; LaMarquis Jefferson; Kenneth Gamble; Leon A. Huff	Jermaine Dupri; LaMarquis "ReMarqable" Jefferson (co.)	3:58
3.	"You Can't Break Me" (Big Tymers)	Bryan Williams; Byron Thomas	Mannie Fresh	4:34
4.	"Where the Party At (11-01-01 Dupri Remix)" (Jagged Edge, Jermaine Dupri, Lil' Bow Wow, R.O.C., Tigah and Da Brat)	Jermaine Dupri; Brandon Casey; Brian Casey; Bryan-Michael Cox		3:53
5.	"Insomnia" (Fundisha)	Fundisha Johnson; Steven Estiverne	Steven Estiverne; Jermaine Dupri (add.)	4:12
6.	"Big Poppa" (Notorious B.I.G.)	Christopher Wallace; Chris Jasper; Ernie Isley; Marvin Isley; O'Kelly Isley; Ronald Isley; Rudolph Isley	Chucky Thompson; Sean "Puffy" Combs	4:11
7.	"Ghetto" (R.L. and Jermaine Dupri)	Jermaine Dupri; Robert L. Huggar; Ricardo Thomas	Rick Rock	4:21
8.	"The Storm Is Over Now" (R. Kelly)	Robert Sylvester Kelly	R. Kelly	4:32
9.	"Ball Game" (Da Brat)	Jermaine Dupri; Shawntae Harris; Bryan-Michael Cox	Jermaine Dupri; Bryan-Michael Cox (co.)	4:40
10.	"Play" (Mobb Deep)	Kejuan Muchita; Albert Johnson	Havoc	3:50
11.	"Who Ya Love" (R.O.C.)	Brandon Casey; Brian Casey; Khim Davis; Rahman Griffin; Roosevelt Harrell III	Bink!	4:06
12.	"Rest of My Life" (Xscape)	Darius Byas; Tamika Scott; Wirlie Morris	Wirlie Morris	4:37
Total length:				47:16

== Charts ==
Chart (2001)	Peak position
US Billboard 200	55
US Top R&B/Hip-Hop Albums (Billboard)	34
US Top Soundtracks (Billboard)	4
