= Boo & Gotti =

American hip hop group

- Born: Chicago, Illinois, U.S.
- Genres: Hip hop
- Years active: 2000–2003
- Labels: Rockland, Cash Money, Universal
- Past members: Boo; Gotti

Boo & Gotti were an American hip-hop duo composed of Sabrian "Boo" Sledge and Mwata "Gotti" Mitchell. The duo are best known for their guest appearance alongside Jay-Z on R. Kelly's 2001 single "Fiesta (Remix)", which peaked at number six on the Billboard Hot 100. It also spent five consecutive weeks atop the Billboard Hot R&B/Hip-Hop Singles & Tracks. Their other notable appearances include Kelly's single "I Wish (Remix)" in 2000, Big Tymers's single "Oh Yeah!" in 2002, and The Fast and the Furious soundtrack in 2001.

Following the success of "Fiesta", the duo signed with Cash Money Records to release their debut and only studio album Perfect Timing (2003). The album narrowly entered the Billboard 200 and was a commercial failure. Following this, the duo was released from Cash Money, and in 2005, Boo signed with Lil Wayne's Young Money Entertainment as a solo artist, but parted ways with the label shortly after.

== Discography ==
=== Studio albums ===
Album details	Peak chart positions	
Album details	U.S.	U.S. R&B
Perfect Timing: Released: August 26, 2003; Label: Cash Money	195	32
"—" denotes a recording that did not chart.

=== Singles ===
==== As lead artist ====
List of singles as lead artist, with selected chart positions, showing year released and album name
Title	Year	Peak chart positions			Album
Title	Year	US	US R&B	US Rap	Album
"Ain't It Man" (featuring Lil Wayne)	2003	—	—	—	Perfect Timing
"—" denotes a recording that did not chart.

==== As featured artist ====
List of singles as lead artist, with selected chart positions, showing year released and album name
Title	Year	Peak chart positions			Album
Title	Year	US	US R&B	US Rap	Album
"Fiesta (Remix)" (R. Kelly featuring Jay-Z and Boo & Gotti)	2001	6	1	—	The R. in R&B Collection, Vol. 1
"Oh Yeah!" (Big Tymers featuring Tateeze and Boo & Gotti)	2002	46	23	13	Hood Rich
"—" denotes a recording that did not chart.

=== Guest appearances ===
List of non-single guest appearances, with other performing artists, showing year released and album name
Title	Year	Other Artist(s)	Album
I Wish – Remix (To the Homies That We Lost)	2000	R. Kelly	TP-2.com
"Freestyle"	2001	none	The Fast and the Furious (soundtrack)
"Worldwide Gangsta"	2001	Ja Rule, Caddillac Tah, Black Child	Pain Is Love
"Get Some"	2001	Jermaine Dupri, Usher, R.O.C.	Instructions
"Ride Together"	2002	Baby	Undisputed (soundtrack)
"Say It Ain't So"	2002	Baby, Keith Murray, Mikkey	Birdman
