= Only the Loot Can Make Me Happy =

2000 single by R. Kelly

Single by R. Kelly

from the album R.
- B-side: "When a Woman's Fed Up"; "I Can't Sleep Baby (If I)"
- Released: April 10, 2000
- Length: 4:58 (album version); 4:06 (edit)
- Label: Jive
- Songwriters: Robert Kelly; Jean-Claude Olivier; Samuel Barnes; David Townsend; David Conley; Bernard Jackson
- Producer: R. Kelly

R. Kelly singles chronology
"Satisfy You" (1999)	"Only the Loot Can Make Me Happy" (2000)	"Bad Man" (2000)

"Only the Loot Can Make Me Happy" is a song co-written, produced, and performed by American R&B musician R. Kelly. The song heavily samples the 1987 Surface song "Happy". "Only the Loot Can Make Me Happy" was released as a single in the United Kingdom on April 10, 2000, and peaked at number 24 on the UK Singles Chart.

== Charts ==
Chart (2000)	Peak position
Australia (ARIA)	166
Europe (Eurochart Hot 100)	91
Scottish Singles Sales (Official Charts)	53
UK Singles (Official Charts)	24
UK Dance (Official Charts)	16
UK Hip Hop/R&B (Official Charts)	7
UK Indie (Official Charts)	5
