= Perfect Timing (Boo & Gotti album) =

Studio album by Boo & Gotti
- Released: August 26, 2003
- Recorded: 2002–2003
- Studio: Patchwerk Studios (Atlanta, Georgia); Circle House Studios (Miami, Florida); Quad Recording Studios (New York City, New York); Rock Land Studios (Chicago, Illinois); Cash Money Studios (New Orleans, Louisiana)
- Genre: Hip-hop
- Length: 60:51
- Label: Ca$h Money; Universal
- Producer: Mannie Fresh; Kanye West; Jazze Pha; Leslie Brathwaite; R. Kelly

Professional ratings
Review scores
Source	Rating
AllMusic	3/5 stars
RapReviews	7/10 stars

Perfect Timing is the only studio album by American hip hop duo Boo & Gotti. It was released on August 26, 2003, through Cash Money Records and Universal Records. Recording sessions took place at Patchwerk Recording Studios in Atlanta, at Circle House Studios in Miami, at Quad Recording Studios in New York City, at Rockland Studios in Chicago, and at Cash Money Studios in New Orleans. Production was handled by Mannie Fresh, Kanye West, Jazze Pha, Leslie Brathwaite and R. Kelly. It features guest appearances from Big Tymers, Cadillac Tah, Gillie Da Kid, Jazze Pha, Lac, Lil' Wayne, Mikkey, R. Kelly, Stone, Tateeze and TQ.

Despite being released by one of hip hop's most popular labels, Perfect Timing was poorly promoted and failed commercially, only reaching 195 on the Billboard 200, dropping off the chart after only one week. The album's lead single was a collaboration with Lil' Wayne entitled "Ain't It Man", however the single failed to reach the Billboard charts. According to Gotti, the album sold around 80,000 copies as of 2015.

== Track listing ==
No.	Title	Writer(s)	Producer(s)	Length
1.	"Perfect Timing" (performed by Big Tymers and Mikkey)	Bryan Williams; Byron Thomas; Mikkel Nance	Mannie Fresh	1:57
2.	"Chi-Town" (featuring Mannie Fresh and Tateeze)	Thomas; Mwata Mitchell; Sabian Sledge; V. Jeffrey Smith	Mannie Fresh	4:35
3.	"Girls Be Trippin" (featuring Gillie da Kid)	Far'd Nasir; Leslie Brathwaite; Mitchell; Sledge	Leslie Brathwaite	3:54
4.	"Bad Chicks at the Bar" (performed by Mannie Fresh)	Thomas; Mitchell; Sledge	Mannie Fresh	1:26
5.	"Ain't It Man" (featuring Lil' Wayne)	Dwayne Carter; Brathwaite; Mitchell; Sledge	Leslie Brathwaite	4:10
6.	"Dear Ghetto" (featuring R. Kelly)	Mitchell; Robert Kelly; Sledge	R. Kelly	4:04
7.	"Gangsta"	Kanye West; Mitchell; Sledge	Kanye West	4:33
8.	"1 Adam 12" (featuring Stone)	Alvin Nelson; Thomas; Mitchell; Sledge	Mannie Fresh	3:25
9.	"Pimp Poetry Interlude" (performed by Mannie Fresh)	Thomas	Mannie Fresh	2:04
10.	"Baby Girl" (featuring TQ)	Thomas; Mitchell; Sledge; Terrence Quaites	Mannie Fresh	4:17
11.	"Chicago"	Al Goodman; Thomas; Harry Ray; Mitchell; Sledge; Walter Morris	Mannie Fresh	4:11
12.	"P.I.M.P. Affair Interlude" (performed by Mannie Fresh)	Thomas; Mitchell; Sledge	Mannie Fresh	1:37
13.	"Ride Tonight" (featuring Jazze Pha and Baby)	Mitchell; Phalon Alexander; Sledge	Jazze Pha	4:02
14.	"Think..." (featuring Jazze Pha)	Thomas; Mitchell; Sledge; William Hart	Mannie Fresh	3:49
15.	"600" (featuring Cadillac Tah)	West; Mitchell; Sledge; Taheem Crocker	Kanye West	4:34
16.	"Hot Shit" (featuring Stone, Lac, Mikkey and Baby)	Nelson; Kedrick Moore; Mitchell; Sledge	Jazze Pha	4:12
17.	"Out Here"	Thomas; Mitchell; Sledge	Mannie Fresh	4:01
Total length:				60:51

Sample credits

- "Chicago" contains a sample of "What's Your Name", written by Al Goodman, Harry Ray and Walter Morris, as performed by The Moments.
- "Think..." contains a sample of "Think it Over", written by William Hart, as performed by The Delfonics.

== Chart history ==
Chart (2003)	Peak position
US Billboard 200	195
US Top R&B/Hip-Hop Albums (Billboard)	32
US Heatseekers Albums (Billboard)	11
