= Sign of a Victory =

Single by R. Kelly featuring Soweto Spiritual Singers

from the album Listen Up! The Official 2010 FIFA World Cup Album and Epic
- Released: June 6, 2010
- Recorded: 2010
- Genre: R&B, pop
- Length: 5:20
- Label: Jive/Zomba
- Songwriter: R. Kelly
- Producer: R. Kelly

R. Kelly singles chronology
"Ms. Chocolate" (2010)	"Sign of a Victory" (2010)	"When a Woman Loves" (2010)

"Sign of a Victory" is a song by American singer R. Kelly, featuring the South African gospel choir Soweto Spiritual Singers. It was the official anthem of the 2010 FIFA World Cup held in South Africa. Released on June 6, 2010, for digital download, the song received generally positive critical reception, and became a minor hit.

It was later included on Listen Up! The Official 2010 FIFA World Cup Album, released on May 31 and in Kelly's compilation album Epic. "Sign of a Victory" was performed by R. Kelly and the Soweto Spiritual Singers at the 2010 FIFA World Cup Kick-Off concert in Soweto on June 10, 2010.

== Music video ==
The video features short clips of R. Kelly performing in Africa and also his visit there. One scene is him at the top of a tall building in Chicago singing. The "Soweto Spiritual Singers" are in the video providing background vocals.

== Critical reception ==
The songs has received positive reviews from fans and critics alike.

== Live performance ==
Kelly has only performed this song once live and that was minutes before the 2010 FIFA World Cup Kick-Off match in Soweto on June 10.

== Charts ==
Chart (2010)	Peak position
Japan Hot 100	12
US Hot R&B/Hip-Hop Songs (Billboard)	81
