= I Believe (R. Kelly song) =

Single by R. Kelly

from the album Osmosis Jones (soundtrack), Playlist: The Very Best of R. Kelly and Epic
- Released: December 16, 2008
- Recorded: 2008
- Genre: R&B
- Length: 5:20
- Label: Jive; Zomba
- Songwriter: R. Kelly
- Producer: R. Kelly

R. Kelly singles chronology
"Out of this Club" (2008)	"I Believe" (2008)	"Number One" (2009)

"I Believe" is an inspirational R&B ballad by American singer R. Kelly. The song initially appeared on the Osmosis Jones soundtrack in 2001 but was later re-written and re-arranged in order to become an anthem for U.S. President Barack Obama's inauguration. The non-album song was released via Amazon.com on December 16, 2008 and appeared later on the compilations Playlist: The Very Best of R. Kelly and Epic. The song has received positive reviews from fans and critics alike.

== Charts ==
Chart (2010)	Peak position
Germany (GfK)	92
U.S. Billboard Bubbling Under R&B/Hip-Hop Singles	9
