= Shaft (2000 soundtrack) =

Music from and Inspired by Shaft

Soundtrack album to Shaft by various artists
- Released: June 13, 2000
- Recorded: 1999–2000
- Studio: various: Backyard Beats (Atlanta, GA); Battery Studios (New York, NY); Blue Basement Recording (Atlanta, GA); Chicago Trax (Chicago, IL); Daddy's House Recording Studios (New York, NY); Darp Recording Studios (Atlanta, GA); Doppler Studios (Atlanta, GA); Legendary Traxster Inc. Studios (Chicago, IL); Marcus Studios (London, England); National Recording Studio (New York, NY); PatchWerk Recording Studios (Atlanta, GA); Playground Minimansion Studio (New Jersey); Powerhouse Studios (Yonkers, NY); Room Digital (NJ); Sony Studios (New York, NY); Sound on Sound Studios (New York, NY); Stankonia Recording (Atlanta, GA); Studio 353 (New York, NY); The Dungeon Recording Studio (Atlanta, GA); The Studio (Philadelphia, PA); Tree Sound (Atlanta, GA)
- Genres: Hip hop; R&B
- Length: 1:14:41
- Label: LaFace Records
- Producer: various: Executive producers; John Singleton; Scott Rudin; Bill Stephney; L.A. Reid; Kawan Prather Record producers; DJ Eddie F; DJ Silk; Dr. Ceuss; Earthtone III; Gerry DeVeaux; Heavy D; Larry "Rock" Campbell; Lellow; Organized Noize; P.A.; R. Kelly; Rondal Rucker; The Legendary Traxster; Timmy Allen; Win & Dose; Warryn Campbell (co.)

Singles from Music from and Inspired by Shaft
- 1. "Summer Rain" Released: January 11, 2000; 2. "Bad Man" Released: May 27, 2000; 3. "Do What I Gotta Do" Released: June 28, 2000

Professional ratings
Review scores
Source	Rating
AllMusic	2/5 stars
Entertainment Weekly	B+

Music from and Inspired by Shaft is the soundtrack to John Singleton's 2000 action crime thriller film Shaft. Composed of seventeen contemporary R&B and hip hop music songs, it was released on June 13, 2000, through LaFace Records.

Production was handled by Earthtone III, R. Kelly, DJ Eddie F, DJ Silk, Dr. Ceuss, Gerry DeVeaux, Heavy D, Larry "Rock" Campbell, Lellow, Organized Noize, Parental Advisory, Rondal Rucker, The Legendary Traxster, Timmy Allen, Win + Dose, and co-producer Warryn Campbell, with John Singleton, Scott Rudin, Bill Stephney, L.A. Reid and Kawan Prather serving as executive producers.

It features contributions from R. Kelly, Alicia Keys, Angie Stone, Backbone, Beanie Sigel, Big Gipp, Big Rube, Carl Thomas, Donell Jones, Eve, Fulanito, Jadakiss, Liberty City, Mil, Mystikal, Outkast, Parle, Sleepy Brown, Too $hort, UGK, and the earliest appearance of rapper T.I., as well as Isaac Hayes's recurring "Theme from Shaft".

The album peaked at number 22 on the Billboard 200 and number three on the Top R&B/Hip-Hop Albums chart in the United States. On July 11, 2000, it was cetrufued Gold by the Recording Industry Association of America for selling 500,000 units in the US. It also peaked at No. 66 in France and No. 92 in Germany. Its lead single, "Bad Man", made it to several European charts, with accompanying music video was directed by Hype Williams, features excerpts from the film.

== Track listing ==
No.	Title	Producer(s)	Length
1.	"Theme from Shaft" (Isaac Hayes)	Isaac Hayes	4:39
2.	"Bad Man" (R. Kelly)	R. Kelly	4:02
3.	"Up and Outta Here" (R. Kelly)	R. Kelly	4:25
4.	"Do What I Gotta Do" (Donell Jones)	Eddie F	4:46
5.	"Rock wit U" (Alicia Keys)	Lellow	5:46
6.	"We Servin'" (Big Gipp)	Rondal Rucker	3:24
7.	"Tough Guy" (Outkast and UGK)	Earthtone III	5:44
8.	"2 Glock 9's" (T.I.P. and Beanie Sigel)	P.A.	4:03
9.	"Summer Rain" (Carl Thomas)	Heavy D; Warryn Campbell (co.)	4:57
10.	"Automatic" (Sleepy Brown, Backbone and Big Rube)	Organized Noize	4:14
11.	"Pimp Shit" (Too $hort and Kokane)	DJ Silk	4:11
12.	"Cheatin'" (Liberty City)	Larry "Rock" Campbell; Timmy Allen	3:54
13.	"Fix Me" (Parle, Eve and Jadakiss)	Dr. Ceuss	3:44
14.	"How You Want It?" (Mil)	The Legendary Traxster	4:00
15.	"Ain't Gonna See Tomorrow" (Mystikal)	Earthtone III	4:33
16.	"My Lovin' Will Give Your Something" (Angie Stone)	Gerry DeVeaux	4:42
17.	"Serenata Negra" (Fulanito)	Windose International	3:37
Total length:			1:14:41

== Personnel ==
- Wah Wah Watson - Guitar
- Alfreda Gerald – backing vocals (track 1)
- Fred Sawyers – backing vocals (track 1)
- Myra Walker – backing vocals (track 1)
- Michael Toles – guitar (track 1)
- Gerald Jackson – keyboards (track 1)
- Lester Snell – keyboards (track 1)
- Isaac Hayes – organ (track 1), Rhodes electric piano & strings (track 5)
- William Kurt Mitchel – bass (track 1)
- Jamal Robertson – drums (track 1)
- Donnie Lyle – guitar & bass (tracks: 2, 3)
- Kendall Nesbitt – keyboards (tracks: 2, 3)
- Robert Kelly – arranger (tracks: 2, 3)
- Ian Mereness – programming (tracks: 2, 3)
- Clifton Lighty – backing vocals (track 4)
- Sheldon Goode – guitar & strings (track 4)
- Gerald Flowers – guitar (track 5)
- Victor Flowers – bass (track 5)
- Patrick "Sleepy" Brown – backing vocals (track 7)
- Darus Adkins – guitar (track 7)
- Earthtone III – keyboards (track 7), arranger (tracks: 7, 15)
- Joe Torano – saxophone (track 7)
- Steve Baxter – trombone (track 7)
- Johnny Britt – trumpet (track 7)
- Brandon "Shug" Bennett – backing vocals (track 10)
- Billy Odum – guitar (track 10)
- Organized Noize – keyboards & drums (track 10)
- Preston Crump – bass (track 10)
- Jimmy "Lord" Brown – flute (track 10)
- Randy Bowland – guitar (track 12)
- Jovon Alexander – keyboards (track 13)
- Myrna "Screechy Peach" Crenshaw – backing vocals (track 15)
- Joi Gilliam – backing vocals (track 15)
- Marvin "Chanz" Parkman – keyboards (track 15)
- Gerry DeVeaux – backing vocals & recording (track 16)
- David Gamson – arranger & mixing (track 16)
- Ron Christopher – recording (track 1)
- Tony Prendatt – mixing (track 1)
- Abel Garibaldi – recording (tracks: 2, 3)
- Tony Maserati – mixing (tracks: 2, 3)
- Acer Keys – recording (track 5)
- Gerry E. Brown – mixing (track 5)
- William Jackson – recording (track 6)
- Leslie Brathwaite – mixing (track 6)
- John Frye – recording (tracks: 7, 15), mixing (track 15)
- Richard "Segal" Huredia – mixing (track 7)
- Mike Wilson – recording (track 8)
- Rob Chiarelli – mixing (track 8)
- Joe Perrera – recording (track 9)
- Rob Paustian – recording (track 9)
- Prince Charles Alexander – mixing (track 9)
- John "Bernasky" Wall – recording (track 10)
- Josh Butler – mixing (track 10)
- Don "DJ Snake" Brown – recording (track 11)
- Robin Mays – recording (track 11)
- Michael Romanowski – mixing (track 11)
- Chris Trevett – recording & mixing (track 12)
- Andre DeBourg – recording & mixing (track 13)
- E-Plugg – recording (track 13)
- Tony Smalios – mixing (track 13)
- Samuel "The Legendary Traxster" Lindley – recording & mixing (track 14)
- Kevin Parker – recording (track 15)
- Ralph Cacciurri – recording (track 15)
- Winston Rosa – recording & mixing (track 17)
- Rafael Vargas – recording & mixing (track 17)
- Bernie Grundman – mastering
- John Singleton – executive producer
- Scott Rudin – executive producer
- Antonio "L.A." Reid – executive producer
- Bill Stephney – executive producer
- Kawan "KP" Prather – executive producer

== Charts ==
Chart (2000)	Peak position
French Albums (SNEP)	66
German Albums (Offizielle Top 100)	92

== Certifications ==
Region	Certification	Certified units/sales
United States (RIAA)	Gold	500,000^{^}
^{^} Shipments figures based on certification alone.
