= The Dynasty: Roc La Familia =

Studio album by Jay-Z
- Released: October 31, 2000
- Recorded: July–September 2000
- Studios: Baseline Studios, New York City
- Genre: Hip-hop
- Length: 66:35
- Labels: Roc-A-Fella; Island Def Jam
- Producers: Kyambo "Hip Hop" Joshua; B-High; Bink!; Just Blaze; Memphis Bleek; the Neptunes; Rick Rock; Rockwilder; T.T.; Kanye West

Jay-Z chronology
| Vol. 3... Life and Times of S. Carter (1999) | The Dynasty: Roc La Familia (2000) | The Blueprint (2001) |

Singles from The Dynasty: Roc La Familia
- 1. "I Just Wanna Love U (Give It 2 Me)" Released: October 17, 2000; 2. "Change the Game" Released: January 9, 2001; 3. "Guilty Until Proven Innocent" Released: March 13, 2001

Professional ratings
Review scores
| Source | Rating |
|---|---|
| AllMusic | 3/5 stars |
| Encyclopedia of Popular Music | 4/5 stars |
| Entertainment Weekly | B+ |
| Los Angeles Times | 2.5/4 stars |
| NME | 4/5 stars |
| Q | 3/5 stars |
| RapReviews | 8/10 |
| Rolling Stone | 4/5 stars |
| The Source | 4.5/5 stars |
| The Village Voice | B |

The Dynasty: Roc La Familia is the fifth studio album by American rapper Jay-Z, featuring prominent appearances from signees of Roc-A-Fella Records. It was released on October 31, 2000, by Roc-A-Fella Records and The Island Def Jam Music Group. Its lead single, "I Just Wanna Love U (Give It 2 Me)", produced by the Neptunes, became one of Jay-Z's most successful singles, peaking at number 11 on the Billboard Hot 100. The album debuted at number 1 on the Billboard 200, with 557,789 copies sold in its first week. The album is certified double platinum by the RIAA. The album received positive reviews from critics, and became the 20th highest-selling R&B/Hip-Hop album of the 2000–2010 decade according to Billboard.

== Music ==
Though originally billed as a Roc-A-Fella Records compilation album—showcasing Roc-A-Fella artists such as Memphis Bleek, Beanie Sigel, Amil, and Freeway—The Dynasty was marketed as a Jay-Z solo album. The production was handled primarily by Just Blaze, Kanye West, Bink!, and the Neptunes.

== Track listing ==
| No. | Title | Writer(s) | Producer(s) | Length |
|---|---|---|---|---|
| 1. | "Intro" | Shawn Carter; Woody Cunningham; Justin Smith | Just Blaze | 3:10 |
| 2. | "Change the Game" (performed by Jay-Z, Beanie Sigel and Memphis Bleek) | Carter; Ricardo Thomas; Malik Cox; Dwight Grant | Rick Rock | 3:07 |
| 3. | "I Just Wanna Love U (Give It 2 Me)" | Carter; Pharrell Williams; Chad Hugo; James Johnson; Christopher Wallace; Deric Angelettie; Sean Combs; Kit Walker; Todd Shaw; Mike City | The Neptunes | 3:47 |
| 4. | "Streets Is Talking" (performed by Jay-Z and Beanie Sigel) | Carter; Smith; Grant | Just Blaze | 4:44 |
| 5. | "This Can't Be Life" (performed by Jay-Z and Beanie Sigel featuring Scarface) | Carter; Kanye West; Grant; Brad Jordan; Kenneth Gamble; Leon Huff | Kanye West | 4:48 |
| 6. | "Get Your Mind Right Mami" (performed by Jay-Z and Memphis Bleek featuring Snoop Dogg) | Carter; Thomas; Cox; Calvin Broadus | Rick Rock | 4:22 |
| 7. | "Stick 2 the Script" (performed by Jay-Z and Beanie Sigel) | Carter; Smith; Grant; Norman Ingram | Just Blaze | 4:08 |
| 8. | "You, Me, Him and Her" (performed by Dynasty) | Carter; Roosevelt Harrell III; Cox; Grant; Amil Whitehead; Willie Goodman; Walter Morris; Harry Ray | Bink | 3:44 |
| 9. | "Guilty Until Proven Innocent" (featuring R. Kelly) | Carter; Dana Stinson; Robert Kelly | Rockwilder | 4:55 |
| 10. | "Parking Lot Pimpin'" (performed by Jay-Z, Beanie Sigel and Memphis Bleek) | Carter; Thomas; Cox; Grant | Rick Rock | 4:15 |
| 11. | "Holla" (performed by Memphis Bleek) | Cox; Briant Biggs | B-High; Memphis Bleek | 3:32 |
| 12. | "1-900-Hustler" (performed by Jay-Z, Beanie Sigel and Memphis Bleek featuring Freeway) | Carter; Harrell; Cox; Grant; Aram Schefrin; Michael Zager | Bink | 3:50 |
| 13. | "The R.O.C." (performed by Beanie Sigel and Memphis Bleek) | Cox; Grant; Smith | Just Blaze | 4:06 |
| 14. | "Soon You'll Understand" | Carter; Smith | Just Blaze | 4:35 |
| 15. | "Squeeze 1st" | Carter; Thomas | Rick Rock | 3:49 |
| 16. | "Where Have You Been" (performed by Jay-Z and Beanie Sigel) | Carter; Edwin Delahoz; Grant; Rafael Pérez Botija | T.T. | 5:33 |

Notes

- "Change the Game" features additional vocals by Static
- "I Just Wanna Love U (Give It 2 Me)" features additional vocals by Pharrell Williams and Omillio Sparks
- "Get Your Mind Right Mami" features additional vocals by Rell
- "Stick 2 the Script" features additional vocals by DJ Clue
- "Parkin Lot Pimpin'" features additional vocals by Lil' Mo
- "Where Have You Been" features additional vocals by L. Dionne

Sample credits

- "Intro" contains a sample of "She Said She Loves Me" by Kleeer.
- "Change the Game" and "Get Your Mind Right Mami" both contain a sample of "You Gots to Chill" by EPMD.
- "I Just Wanna Love U (Give It 2 Me)" contains elements of "Give It to Me Baby" performed by Rick James, an interpolation of "The World Is Filled..." by the Notorious B.I.G., and an interpolation of "I Wish" performed by Carl Thomas.
- "This Can't Be Life" contains a sample of "I Miss You" performed by Harold Melvin & the Blue Notes.
- "Stick 2 the Script" contains a sample of "Under Pressure" by Nick Ingman.
- "You, Me, Him, and Her" contains a sample of "What's Your Name" performed by the Moments.
- "1-900-Hustler" contains a sample of "Ain't Gonna Happen" by Ten Wheel Drive.
- "Soon You'll Understand" contains a sample of the Love Theme from The Landlord, by Al Kooper.
- "Squeeze 1st" contains interpolations of "Hypnotize" and "Who Shot Ya?", both performed by the Notorious B.I.G.
- "Where Have You Been" contains a sample of "Agua De Dos Ríos" performed by Camilo Sesto.

== Personnel ==
Adapted from AllMusic.

- B-High – producer
- Kareem "Biggs" Burke – executive producer
- Shawn Carter – executive producer
- Damon Dash – executive producer
- L. Dionne – vocals
- DJ Clue? – featured artist, vocals
- Freeway – primary artist
- Chad Hugo – producer
- Ken "Duro" Ifill – mixing
- Jay-Z – vocals
- Kyambo "Hip Hop" Joshua – executive producer
- Just Blaze – producer, scratching
- R. Kelly – featured artist
- Lil' Mo – featured artist
- Jonathan Mannion – photography
- Memphis Bleek – featured artist
- Monica Morrow – stylist
- Rell – vocals
- Rick Rock – producer
- Scarface – featured artist
- Beanie Sigel – featured artist
- Snoop Dogg – featured artist
- Static – vocals
- Dawud West – art direction, design
- Kanye West – producer
- Pharrell Williams – producer
- Shane "Bermy" Woodley – assistant engineer
- Amil – featured artist

== Charts ==
=== Weekly charts ===
| Chart (2000) | Peak position |
|---|---|
| Canadian Albums (Billboard) | 5 |
| Canadian R&B Albums (Nielsen SoundScan) | 2 |
| German Albums (Offizielle Top 100) | 98 |
| Swiss Albums (Schweizer Hitparade) | 89 |
| UK Albums (Official Charts) | 86 |
| UK R&B Albums (Official Charts) | 14 |
| US Billboard 200 | 1 |
| US Top R&B/Hip-Hop Albums (Billboard) | 1 |

=== Singles ===
| Year | Song | Peak positions | | |
| Year | Song | US Hot 100 | US R&B | US Rap |
|---|---|---|---|---|
| 2000 | "I Just Wanna Love U (Give It 2 Me)" | 11 | 1 | 4 |
| 2001 | "Change the Game" | 86 | 29 | 10 |
| 2001 | "Guilty Until Proven Innocent" | 82 | 29 | 12 |

=== Year-end charts ===
| Chart (2000) | Position |
|---|---|
| Canadian Albums (Nielsen SoundScan) | 168 |
| US Billboard 200 | 106 |
| US Top R&B/Hip-Hop Albums (Billboard) | 33 |

| Chart (2001) | Position |
|---|---|
| Canadian R&B Albums (Nielsen SoundScan) | 62 |
| US Billboard 200 | 58 |
| US Top R&B/Hip-Hop Albums (Billboard) | 14 |

== Certifications ==
| Region | Certification | Certified units/sales |
|---|---|---|
| United Kingdom (BPI) | Silver | 60,000^{*} |
| United States (RIAA) | 2× Platinum | 2,000,000^{^} |
^{*} Sales figures based on certification alone.^{^} Shipments figures based on certification alone.

== See also ==
- List of Billboard 200 number-one albums of 2000
- List of Billboard number-one R&B albums of 2000
