= Guilty Until Proven Innocent =

2000 song by Jay-Z

Single by Jay-Z featuring R. Kelly

from the album The Dynasty: Roc La Familia
- Released: March 13, 2001
- Recorded: 2000
- Genre: East Coast hip hop; gangsta rap
- Length: 4:55
- Label: Roc-A-Fella; Def Jam
- Songwriters: Shawn Carter; Robert Kelly; Dana Stinson
- Producer: Rockwilder

Jay-Z singles chronology
"Do My..." (2001)	"Guilty Until Proven Innocent" (2001)	"Fiesta (Remix)" (2001)

R. Kelly singles chronology
"A Woman's Threat" (2001)	"Guilty Until Proven Innocent" (2001)	"The Storm Is Over Now" (2001)

Music video
- "Guilty Until Proven Innocent" on YouTube

"Guilty Until Proven Innocent" is the third and final single from rapper Jay-Z's 2000 album The Dynasty: Roc La Familia. It features production by Rockwilder and a chorus sung by R. Kelly. The song's title flips the legal declaration "innocent until proven guilty" and its lyrics follow suit. Jay-Z's lyrics deal with how the press villainized Jay-Z by accusing him of stabbing his once business partner Lance Rivera on December 2, 1999. Jay-Z later pled guilty to stabbing Rivera and was sentenced to 3 years probation for the incident. "Guilty Until Proven Innocent" is also one of the first collaborations between Jay-Z and R. Kelly before they released two albums together.

On June 12, 2001—three months after the release of the "Guilty Until Proven Innocent" single—a DVD named The Making of Guilty Until Proven Innocent was released. The DVD helps explain the making of the Paul Hunter-directed music video that shows R. Kelly and Jay-Z rapping in court.

Buckshot and 9th Wonder sampled this song on their Food for Thought song from the album Chemistry in 2005.

== Music video ==
The music video for this song is directed by Paul Hunter. R. Kelly and Jay-Z do not have a scene where they are together in this video, but separate scenes.

== Formats and track listings ==
=== CD ===
1. "Guilty Until Proven Innocent" (Radio Edit)
2. "Guilty Until Proven Innocent" (Album Version)
3. "Change the Game"
4. "Guilty Until Proven Innocent" (Enhanced Video)

=== Vinyl ===
A-side

1. "Guilty Until Proven Innocent" (Radio Edit)
2. "Guilty Until Proven Innocent" (LP Version)
3. "Guilty Until Proven Innocent" (Instrumental)

B-side

1. "1-900-HUSTLER" (Radio Edit)
2. "1-900-HUSTLER" (LP Version)
3. "1-900-HUSTLER" (Instrumental)

== Charts ==
Chart (2001)	Peak position
US Billboard Hot 100	82
US Hot R&B/Hip-Hop Songs (Billboard)	29
US Hot Rap Songs (Billboard)	12

== See also ==
- List of songs recorded by Jay-Z
