= The Storm Is Over Now =

2001 single by R. Kelly

Single by R. Kelly

from the album TP-2.com and Music from the Motion Picture Hardball
- Released: March 19, 2001
- Length: 4:32
- Label: Jive
- Songwriter: Robert Kelly
- Producer: R. Kelly

R. Kelly singles chronology
"Guilty Until Proven Innocent" (2001)	"The Storm Is Over Now" (2001)	"Fiesta (Remix)" (2001)

"The Storm Is Over Now" is a song by American R&B singer R. Kelly from his fourth solo studio album, TP-2.com. It was released as the third single from the album on March 19, 2001, outside the United States. The song charted at number 18 on the UK Singles Chart and became a top-10 hit in Austria, Germany, and Switzerland. The song is both written and produced by Kelly himself. It was included in the soundtrack to the 2001 film Hardball.

== Music video ==
The music video was directed by R. Kelly and Bille Woodruff.

== Charts ==
=== Weekly charts ===
Chart (2001)	Peak position
Australia (ARIA)	96
Austria (Ö3 Austria Top 40)	10
Belgium (Ultratop 50 Flanders)	26
Belgium (Ultratip Bubbling Under Wallonia)	4
France (SNEP)	57
Germany (GfK)	13
Italy (FIMI)	50
Netherlands (Dutch Top 40)	32
Netherlands (Single Top 100)	29
Poland Airplay (Music & Media)	4
Sweden (Sverigetopplistan)	38
Switzerland (Schweizer Hitparade)	6
UK Singles (Official Charts)	18
UK Hip Hop/R&B (Official Charts)	6
UK Indie (Official Charts)	2

=== Year-end charts ===
Chart (2001)	Position
Austria (Ö3 Austria Top 40)	59
Germany (Media Control)	82
Switzerland (Schweizer Hitparade)	54
