= Fiesta (R. Kelly song) =

2001 song by R. Kelly featuring Jay-Z and Boo & Gotti

Song by R. Kelly featuring Boo & Gotti

from the album TP-2.com
- Released: November 7, 2000
- Length: 4:17
- Label: Jive
- Songwriter: Robert Kelly
- Producers: Poke & Tone; Precision

"Fiesta (Remix)"
- Artwork for U.S. and French releases (U.S. CD single pictured)

Single by R. Kelly featuring Jay-Z and Boo & Gotti

from the album TP-2.com
- Released: April 10, 2001
- Studio: Rockland (Chicago, Illinois)
- Length: 3:16 (album version); 4:01 (remix)
- Label: Jive
- Songwriters: Robert Kelly; Shawn Carter; Samuel Barnes; Jean-Claude Olivier; Larry Gates; Pavlo Simtikidis
- Producers: Poke & Tone; Precision

R. Kelly singles chronology
"The Storm Is Over Now" (2001)	"Fiesta (Remix)" (2001)	"Contagious" (2001)

Jay-Z singles chronology
"Guilty Until Proven Innocent" (2001)	"Fiesta (Remix)" (2001)	"Izzo (H.O.V.A.)" (2001)

"Fiesta (Remix)"
R. Kelly's "Fiesta (Remix)" from TP-2.com and featuring Jay-Z and Boo & Gotti

"Fiesta" is a song by singer R. Kelly featuring rappers Jay-Z and Boo & Gotti from his fourth solo album, TP-2.com (2000). With support from a remix featuring Jay-Z, the song spent five weeks at number one on the US Billboard Hot R&B/Hip-Hop Singles & Tracks chart and peaked at number six on the Billboard Hot 100. The single is ranked by Billboard as the most successful R&B/hip-hop song of 2001. In Germany, the song entered the top 10, peaking at number eight on the Media Control singles charts.

== Background ==
"Fiesta" was produced by was produced by production duo Poke and Tone, consisting of Samuel Barnes and Jean-Claude Olivier, for R. Kelly's 2000 album TP-2.com. The production process was part of a period in which the duo was managing multiple high-profile projects simultaneously, including albums for Will Smith and other Columbia Records artists. For "Fiesta," Barnes traveled to Chicago to work directly with Kelly, while Olivier continued production duties with Smith. According to the producers, when the track first played, Kelly immediately responded to its upbeat energy by exclaiming "Ohh it's a party" and spontaneously using the word "fiesta," which inspired the song's central theme. The lyrics and vocals were developed in a single session that evening.

== Release ==
"Fiesta" spent five weeks at number one on the US Billboard Hot R&B/Hip-Hop Singles & Tracks chart and also reached number six on the Billboard Hot 100 chart.

== Remix ==
For the remix of "Fiesta," producers Barnes and Olivier aimed to include Jay-Z, whose participation was considered highly selective and difficult to secure. While label executive Steve Stoute and Jay-Z had a cordial working relationship, negotiations required persistence, and initial sessions were complicated by the absence of Kelly, who was temporarily unavailable due to his own working habits. When Jay-Z first heard the beat, he immediately recognized its potential, exclaiming that the track was a "monster." He began composing his verses mentally while discussing the project with the producers, but temporarily left the studio due to scheduling conflicts, providing only a preview of his intended performance. After further coordination, he returned the following night, completed his verse, and delivered the final recording.

== Music video ==
The music video for the single was directed by R. Kelly and Little X in Florida.

== Personnel ==
- R. Kelly – songwriting, vocals, primary artist
- Jay-Z – songwriting, vocals, guest appearance
- Poke & Tone – songwriting, production
- Larry Gates (Precision) – songwriting, production
- Boo & Gotti – vocals, guest appearance
- Donnie Lyle – additional guitars
- Abel Garibaldi – recording, additional programming
- Ian Mereness – recording
- Andy Gallas – programming assistant
- Rich Travali – mixing
- Patrick Woodward – mixing assistant
- contains a guitar sample from "Fantasia" written and performed by Pavlo Simtikidis

== Charts ==
=== Weekly charts ===
Chart (2001)	Peak position
Australia (ARIA)	69
Australian Urban (ARIA)	19
Austria (Ö3 Austria Top 40)	27
Belgium (Ultratop 50 Flanders)	36
Belgium (Ultratop 50 Wallonia)	19
Canada (Nielsen SoundScan)	19
Europe (Eurochart Hot 100)	23
France (SNEP)	17
Germany (GfK)	8
Netherlands (Dutch Top 40 Tipparade)	2
Netherlands (Single Top 100)	48
Scottish Singles Sales (Official Charts)	51
Sweden (Sverigetopplistan)	46
Switzerland (Schweizer Hitparade)	11
UK Singles (Official Charts)	23
UK Dance (Official Charts)	7
UK Hip Hop/R&B (Official Charts)	6
UK Independent (Official Charts)	3
US Billboard Hot 100	6
US Hot R&B/Hip-Hop Songs (Billboard)	1
US Rhythmic Airplay (Billboard)	10

=== Year-end charts ===
Chart (2001)	Position
Canada (Nielsen SoundScan)	101
Canada (Nielsen SoundScan) Import	130
Germany (Media Control)	74
Switzerland (Schweizer Hitparade)	52
UK Urban (Music Week)	6
US Billboard Hot 100	45
US Hot R&B/Hip-Hop Singles & Tracks (Billboard)	1
US Rhythmic Top 40 (Billboard)	49

== Release history ==
Region	Date	Format(s)	Label(s)	Ref.
United States	April 10, 2001	Urban contemporary radio	Jive; Tavdash	
United Kingdom	June 11, 2001	12-inch vinyl; CD; cassette	Jive; Tavdash	
Australia	June 25, 2001	CD	Jive; Tavdash	

== Samplings ==
- "Ignition (Remix)" by R. Kelly from the album Chocolate Factory (2003)
- "Ride Til I Die" by Shawn Do, Mistah F.A.B. and Dubb 20 from the album Thizz Nation Vol. 2 (2005)
- "Mafia (Remix)" by The Relativez featuring Nuttz from the album Legendary (2007)
- "We F'd Up" by J Dilla from the album Pay Jay (2008)
- "After Party" by The Lonely Island featuring Santigold from the album Turtleneck & Chain (2011)
- "Songs on 12 Play" by Chris Brown featuring Trey Songz from the album X (2014)
