= Bad Man (song) =

2000 single by R. Kelly

- International artwork

Single by R. Kelly

from the album Shaft (2000 soundtrack)
- Released: June 6, 2000
- Length: 4:03
- Label: Jive
- Songwriter: Robert Kelly
- Producer: R. Kelly

R. Kelly singles chronology
"Only the Loot Can Make Me Happy" (2000)	"Bad Man" (2000)	"I Wish" (2000)

"Bad Man" is a song by American musician R. Kelly, included on the soundtrack for the 2000 film Shaft. It was the first and only single from the Shaft soundtrack and charted at number 30 on the US Billboard Hot R&B/Hip-Hop Singles & Tracks chart. A video for the song was directed by Hype Williams.

== Music video ==
The music video, directed by Hype Williams, features clips from Shaft.

== Charts ==
Chart (2000)	Peak position
Belgium (Ultratip Bubbling Under Flanders)	3
Belgium (Ultratop 50 Wallonia)	40
France (SNEP)	32
Germany (GfK)	57
Netherlands (Dutch Top 40)	33
Netherlands (Single Top 100)	34
Switzerland (Schweizer Hitparade)	50
US Hot R&B/Hip-Hop Songs (Billboard)	30
