= Contagious (song) =

Single by The Isley Brothers featuring R. Kelly and Chanté Moore

from the album Eternal
- Released: July 24, 2001
- Genre: R&B; soul
- Length: 4:52
- Label: DreamWorks
- Songwriter: R. Kelly
- Producer: R. Kelly

The Isley Brothers singles chronology
"Tears" (1996)	"Contagious" (2001)	"Secret Lover" (2001)

R. Kelly singles chronology
"Fiesta (Remix)" (2001)	"Contagious" (2001)	"Feelin' on Yo Booty" (2001)

Chanté Moore singles chronology
"Take Care of Me" (2001)	"Contagious" (2001)	"One More Time" (2002)

"Contagious" is a song by American soul group The Isley Brothers. Released as a single from their 2001 album Eternal, the song was written and produced by R. Kelly, who was also featured on the song, and also features vocals by R&B singer Chanté Moore.

== Accolades ==
In 2002, the song won a Soul Train Music Award for Best R&B/Soul Single, Group, Band or Duo.

== Chart performance ==
"Contagious" rose to number 19 on the pop singles chart and number 3 on the R&B singles chart, making the Isleys the first group to score a hit in six consecutive decades on Billboard's Hot 100, and to date is their last single to reach the Top 40. The breakthrough helped their 2001 album Eternal go double platinum.

== Music video ==
The video plays as a mini soap opera depicting a man who goes home and finds out his woman has been cheating on him with another man. The song is taken to another level during the breakdown of the song, where the two men, Mr. Biggs and Kelly, meet once again after their previous collaboration on Kelly's 1995 single "Down Low (Nobody Has to Know)" (although they also collaborated on Kelly Price's 1998 single "Friend of Mine"). In the middle of the second verse, Ron Isley goes down memory lane after saying "The down low happened to me all over again"; additionally, the third verse starts with Mr. Biggs asking R. Kelly "What the hell is going on between the sheets in my own home?", reprising their meeting in the Kelly Price song as well as the title of his own hit "Between the Sheets", and R. Kelly accuses Mr. Biggs (who recalls seeing him before) of mistaken identity.

R. Kelly makes a cameo in the 2003 follow-up song "Busted" that is told from the prospective of Mr. Biggs and his current partner. In the video, he is seen returning the woman to Mr. Biggs's home before she is confronted about the affair.

== Track listing ==
1. "Contagious" (clean radio edit) – 4:27
2. "Contagious" (radio edit) – 4:27
3. "Contagious" (LP version) – 5:46
4. "Contagious" (instrumental) – 5:46
5. "Contagious" (a capella) – 5:41

== Charts ==
=== Weekly charts ===
Weekly chart performance for "Contagious "
Chart (2001)	Peak position
US Billboard Hot 100	19
US Hot R&B/Hip-Hop Songs (Billboard)	3
US Rhythmic Airplay (Billboard)	22

=== Year-end charts ===
Year-end chart performance for "Contagious"
Chart (2001)	Position
US Billboard Hot 100	81
US Hot R&B/Hip-Hop Songs (Billboard)	28
