= Love Letter (R. Kelly album) =

Studio album by R. Kelly
- Released: December 14, 2010
- Recorded: February–June 2010
- Length: 60:12
- Label: Jive
- Producer: R. Kelly

R. Kelly chronology
Untitled (2009)	Love Letter (2010)	Write Me Back (2012)

Singles from Love Letter
- 1. "When a Woman Loves" Released: September 7, 2010; 2. "Love Letter" Released: November 22, 2010; 3. "Radio Message" Released: February 2011; 4. "Number One Hit" Released: April 2011

Love Letter is the tenth studio album by American R&B recording artist R. Kelly. It was released on December 14, 2010, by Jive Records. This was the final album to be released under the Jive label, as Jive was folded into RCA Records in 2011. It was written and produced entirely by Kelly. A departure from his previous work's contemporary sound and sexually explicit themes, Love Letter incorporates classic 1950s/1960s soul music influences and features chivalrous lyrics concerning love and forgiveness.

The album debuted at number 6 on the US Billboard 200 chart, selling 154,000 copies in its first week. It produced two singles that attained respectable charting on the US Hot R&B/Hip-Hop Songs chart. Upon its release, Love Letter received positive reviews from most music critics, who complimented its classically minded style and praised Kelly for his singing and songwriting. It was certified Gold by the Recording Industry Association of America (RIAA).

== Composition ==
Love Letter is an homage to the classic soul music of the 1960s, 1970s, and 1980s. Kelly was heavily inspired by such soul artists as Marvin Gaye, Jackie Wilson, Donny Hathaway, Sam Cooke, Michael Jackson, and Stevie Wonder. Kelly further pays tribute to Jackson, who died in 2009, with his own version of "You Are Not Alone" (a song he had written for Jackson), featured on Love Letter as a hidden bonus track.

== Release and promotion ==
Prior to its physical CD release on December 14, Love Letter was released as a digital download on December 10, 2010, to the iTunes Store, which included the album with the iTunes LP format feature. The album's first single "When a Woman Loves" peaked at number 16 and spent seven weeks on the US Hot R&B/Hip-Hop Songs chart. It charted at number 93 on the Billboard Hot 100. The second single "Love Letter" also spent seven weeks and peaked at number 13 on Billboard's Hot R&B/Hip Hop Songs. A three-part video documentary was released in promotion of the album, featuring footage of R. Kelly discussing the album and its conception. The third single "Number One Hit" reached number 83 and has spent four weeks on Billboard's Hot R&B/Hip Hop Songs.

== Critical reception ==
Professional ratings
Review scores
Source	Rating
AllMusic	4/5 stars
The A.V. Club	B+
Chicago Tribune	3/4 stars
Entertainment Weekly	B
The Guardian	4/5 stars
Los Angeles Times	3.5/4 stars
Pitchfork Media	8.2/10
Rolling Stone	3.5/5 stars
Slant Magazine	2/5 stars
Spin	8/10

Love Letter received generally positive reviews from music critics. At Metacritic, which assigns a normalized rating out of 100 to reviews from mainstream critics, the album received an average score of 77, based on 17 reviews, which indicates "generally favorable reviews". AllMusic writer Andy Kellman called it "easily the least sexually charged album in [Kelly's] discography, ideal for those who admire him as a singer, arranger, and producer but tune out the fantastical come-ons". Los Angeles Times writer August Brown complimented its "slow-simmered, grown-man emoting" and Kelly's "melodicism and vocal powers". Jon Caramanica of The New York Times commended the album's "gentle adult-contemporary R&B" and Kelly for "singing as vigorously as ever, on songs that are some of the most elegant of his career", commenting that its songs are "in essence, secular spirituals, bombastic and warm, meant not to raise an eyebrow". Chicago Tribune writer Greg Kot noted its classicist musical sources and viewed it as a departure from Kelly's previous work, stating "for the most part Kelly forgoes the sing-songy minimalism that made him rich in favor of more developed melodies, fully orchestrated arrangements and lyrics that are as much spiritual as sexual".

Pitchfork Media's Jess Harvell called Kelly's singing "a marvel throughout" and stated, "A few outright and faithful homages to the Marvin/Smokey era aside, Kelly smears these period references—tremulous Hi Records guitars, popping SOS Band bass, the percussion of Michael Jackson's disco years—into unexpected combinations". Mikael Wood of The Village Voice called it a "commitment-pimping [...] classically minded r&b album" and commented that "much of which plays like a modest about-face from Untitled's unabashed raunch". Maura Johnston of Spin praised Kelly's "exquisite phrasing and unparalleled ability to belt", commenting that "his decision to ditch the club and retreat to a more conventionally romantic setting allows him to let his voice take center stage". Ken Capobianco of The Boston Globe called the album "a back-to-basics collection of beautifully sung and arranged tracks emphasizing romance and devotion", writing that its music "complements Kelly’s vocal flights and impeccable, expressive phrasing". The A.V. Club's Nathan Rabin described it as "proudly old-fashioned soul [...] warm, reassuringly familiar" and called Kelly "a consummate showman".

In a mixed review, Slant Magazine's Eric Henderson found Kelly's sentiments "generic" and described its music as "vanilla-smooth, grown-folks grooves that hearken not just to stepping in the name of love, but also some of the faux-Motown simulations from that most mechanical of recent musicals, Dreamgirls". New York writer Nitsuh Abebe called its songs "the audio equivalent of buying flowers" and interpreted its theme of forgiveness to be directed at "the alleged capacity of women to forgive men for all failures, so long as a little knee-bending and charm is involved". Rolling Stone observed a "relatively novel concept", but commented that "it's a testament to Kelly's ingenuity as a singer and songwriter that Love Letter doesn't fizzle — even with the fly zipped up on his wildest eccentricities". Hugh Montgomery of The Observer wrote that "It's pastiche, certainly, but Kelly's expressive croon carries the day: equal parts honeyed and rasping, and bristling with a sincerity that reaches its zenith on the spine-tingling, a cappella finale of 'When a Woman Loves'".

=== Accolades ===
Jon Caramanica of The New York Times ranked the album number nine on his year-end top albums list for 2010. Love Letter was nominated for a Grammy Award for Best R&B Album, set to be presented at the 54th Grammy Awards in 2012. The song "Radio Message" was nominated for a Grammy Award for Best Traditional R&B Performance. "When a Woman Loves" was also nominated for a Grammy Award for Best Traditional R&B Performance a year later.

== Commercial performance ==
The album debuted at number 6 on the US Billboard 200 chart, with first-week sales of 154,000 copies in the United States. It serves as Kelly's thirteenth US top-10 charting album. It also entered at number 2 on the Billboard's R&B/Hip-Hop Albums and at number 3 on the Digital Albums chart. On March 1, 2011, the album was certified gold by the Recording Industry Association of America (RIAA), for shipments of 500,000 copies in the United States. On March 30, 2011, Love Letter has sold 496,600 copies in the United States. In the United Kingdom, the album debuted at number 39 on the Top 40 R&B Albums chart. It charted at number 26 in the Netherlands.

== Track listing ==
All songs written and produced by R. Kelly.

No.	Title	Length
1.	"Love Letter (Prelude Intro)"	0:49
2.	"Love Letter"	4:49
3.	"Number One Hit"	4:24
4.	"Not Feelin' the Love"	3:34
5.	"Lost in Your Love"	4:34
6.	"Just Can't Get Enough"	3:10
7.	"Taxi Cab"	4:00
8.	"Radio Message"	3:50
9.	"When a Woman Loves"	5:10
10.	"Love Is" (featuring K. Michelle)	3:24
11.	"Just Like That"	3:19
12.	"Music Must Be a Lady"	4:35
13.	"A Love Letter Christmas"	5:44
14.	"How Do I Tell Her?"	4:20
15.	"You Are Not Alone" (hidden track)	4:29

Best Buy exclusive / Japan bonus tracks
No.	Title	Length
15.	"Fallin' Hearts"	4:30
16.	"Butterfly"	4:38
17.	"Relief"	3:27
18.	"When a Woman Loves (Remix)"	2:30
19.	"You Are Not Alone" (hidden track)	4:29

== Personnel ==
Credits for Love Letter adapted from Allmusic.

- Diana Copeland – executive assistant
- Akua Auset – make-up
- Ann Carli – consultant
- Rodney East – keyboards
- Meghan Foley – art direction, design
- Andy Gallas – assistant
- Abel Garibaldi – engineer, mixing, programming
- Şerban Ghenea – mixing
- John Hanes – mixing
- R. Kelly – arranger, composer, mixing, producer
- Gregg Landfair – guitar
- Susan Linss – set design
- Donnie Lyle – guitar, bass guitar, musical director
- Jeff Meeks – engineer, programming
- Ian Mereness – engineer, mixing, programming
- K. Michelle – vocals
- Jackie Murphy – creative director
- Chiquita Oden – grooming
- Herb Powers Jr. – mastering
- Tim Roberts – mixing assistant
- April Roomet – stylist
- Randee St. Nicholas – photography

== Charts ==
=== Weekly charts ===
Weekly chart performance for Love Letter
Chart (2010–11)	Peak position
Dutch Albums (Album Top 100)	26
UK Albums (OCC)	153
UK R&B Albums (OCC)	39
US Billboard 200	6
US Digital Albums (Billboard)	3
US Top R&B/Hip-Hop Albums (Billboard)	2

=== Year-end charts ===
Year-end chart performance for Love Letter
Chart (2011)	Position
US Billboard 200	43
US Top R&B/Hip-Hop Albums (Billboard)	9

== Certifications ==
Sales and certifications for Love Letter
Region	Certification	Certified units/sales
United States (RIAA)	Gold	500,000^{^}
^{^} Shipments figures based on certification alone.
