= When a Woman Loves (song) =

Single by R. Kelly

from the album Love Letter
- Released: September 7, 2010
- Recorded: 2009
- Genre: R&B; soul
- Length: 5:11 (album version); 4:36 (radio edit)
- Label: Jive
- Songwriter(s): R. Kelly
- Producer(s): R. Kelly

R. Kelly singles chronology
"Sign of a Victory" (2010)	"When a Woman Loves" (2010)	"Love Letter" (2010)

"When a Woman Loves" is the first single by American singer R. Kelly from his eleventh studio album Love Letter. The song peaked at number 93 on the Billboard Hot 100; and it was promoted with a music video directed by Kelly and Jeremy Rall. In 2011 R. Kelly was nominated for a Grammy Award for Best Traditional R&B Performance, but lost.

== Music video ==
The music video is directed by Jeremy Rall, who also directed Kelly’s later music video "Radio Message".

== Critical reception ==
Entertainment Weekly commented that the song "has a classic throwback vibe unlike almost anything in his recent catalog."

== Charts ==
Chart (2010)	Peak position
Netherlands (Single Top 100)	36
US Billboard Hot 100	93
US Hot R&B/Hip-Hop Songs (Billboard)	16
US Ringtones (Billboard)	28
