= A Woman's Threat =

2001 single by R. Kelly

Single by R. Kelly

from the album TP-2.com
- Released: February 27, 2001
- Length: 5:55
- Label: Jive
- Songwriter(s): Robert Kelly
- Producer(s): R. Kelly

R. Kelly singles chronology
"I Wish" (2000)	"A Woman's Threat" (2001)	"Guilty Until Proven Innocent" (2001)

"A Woman's Threat" is a song written, produced, and performed by American R&B singer R. Kelly. It was released as the second single from his fourth solo studio album, TP-2.com (2000), in February 27, 2001. The song charted at number 15 on the US Billboard Bubbling Under Hot 100, number 35 on the Billboard Hot R&B/Hip-Hop Singles & Tracks chart, and number 43 in Germany. A six-minute music video was made for the song.

== Music video ==
The music video is directed by R. Kelly.

== Charts ==
Chart (2001)	Peak position
Austria (Ö3 Austria Top 40)	69
Belgium (Ultratip Bubbling Under Flanders)	8
Belgium (Ultratip Bubbling Under Wallonia)	7
Germany (GfK)	43
Netherlands (Single Top 100)	64
Switzerland (Schweizer Hitparade)	58
US Bubbling Under Hot 100 Singles (Billboard)	15
US Hot R&B/Hip-Hop Songs (Billboard)	35
