= Hair Braider =

Promotional single by R. Kelly

from the album 12 Play: 4th Quarter
- Released: April 29, 2008
- Recorded: 2008
- Genre: Electro-R&B
- Length: 4:05
- Label: Jive Records
- Songwriters: Robert Kelly, Justin Keith Henderson, Chris Whitacre
- Producers: R. Kelly, Tha Bizness

"Hair Braider" is the first promotional single released from R. Kelly's album 12 Play: 4th Quarter, which was never released, due to the album being leaked to the internet about a month before its planned release date and bootlegging. The song is about having sexual relations with a lady who braids his hair. The song was written and produced by Tha Bizness and Kelly himself.

The video leaked onto the internet on April 23, 2008 and features Kelly having his hair braided by multiple women. The release of the single as a digital download followed on April 29.

== Music video ==
The music video is directed by R. Malcolm Jones.

== Chart performance ==
Chart (2008)	Peak position
U.S. Hot R&B/Hip-Hop Songs	56
