= Feelin' on Yo Booty =

2001 single by R. Kelly

Single by R. Kelly

from the album TP-2.com
- Released: July 17, 2001
- Length: 4:05
- Label: Jive
- Songwriter: Robert Kelly
- Producer: R. Kelly

R. Kelly singles chronology
"Contagious" (2001)	"Feelin' on Yo Booty" (2001)	"We Thuggin'" (2001)

"Feelin' on Yo Booty" is a song by American singer R. Kelly from his fourth studio album, TP-2.com. Released on July 17, 2001, it was the fifth and final single from the album.

== Background ==
On March 28, 2018, while the BBC were filming a documentary regarding R. Kelly's sexual abuse allegations, Kelly's former studio engineer James Lee revealed that the song was actually written while Kelly was viewing two "booties" on either side of him.

== Music video ==
The music video is directed by Bille Woodruff and features appearances from DJ Khaled, Erick Sermon, Lil' Kim, Method Man, Redman, Nelly, Fat Joe, and Lennox Lewis.

== Charts ==
=== Weekly charts ===
Weekly chart performance for "Feelin' on Yo Booty"
Chart (2001)	Peak position
US Billboard Hot 100	36
US Hot R&B/Hip-Hop Songs (Billboard)	9
US Rhythmic Airplay (Billboard)	30

=== Year-end charts ===
Year-end chart performance for "Feelin' on Yo Booty"
Chart (2001)	Position
US Hot R&B/Hip-Hop Singles & Tracks (Billboard)	35
