= TP-2.com =

Studio album by R. Kelly
- Released: November 7, 2000
- Recorded: 1999–2000
- Genres: R&B; hip hop
- Length: 77:52
- Label: Jive
- Producers: R. Kelly; Poke & Tone; Precision

R. Kelly chronology
| R. (1998) | TP-2.com (2000) | The Best of Both Worlds (2002) |

Singles from TP-2.com
- 1. "I Wish" Released: September 12, 2000; 2. "A Woman's Threat" Released: February 27, 2001; 3. "The Storm Is Over Now" Released: April 3, 2001; 4. "Fiesta (Remix)" Released: May 15, 2001; 5. "Feelin' on Yo Booty" Released: August 7, 2001

TP-2.com (an abbreviation of Twelve Play-2) is the fourth solo album by American R&B recording artist R. Kelly, released on November 7, 2000, by Jive Records.

== Background ==
Released as the "sequel" to Kelly's 12 Play, TP-2.com had party songs, relationship-themed ballads and a gospel-influenced song, but it still had Kelly's trademark sensuality with songs including "The Greatest Sex" and "Strip for You". The album was most notable for two number 1 R&B hits: the tribute song "I Wish", and the party anthem, "Fiesta (Remix)", which featured Jay-Z. The latter duet inspired the two to create the collaborative project The Best of Both Worlds. Another notable single was the risque "Feelin' On Yo Booty". The album has since been certified 4× Platinum. The album was Kelly's second album to peak at number 1 on the Billboard 200 and the fourth to top the Top R&B/Hip-Hop Albums charts. TP-2.com was the number one R&B Album on the Billboard Year-End chart for 2001.

== Critical reception ==
Professional ratings
Aggregate scores
| Source | Rating |
|---|---|
| Metacritic | 71/100 |
Review scores
| Source | Rating |
| Allmusic | 3/5 stars |
| Blender | 3/5 stars |
| Entertainment Weekly | B+ |
| Los Angeles Times | 3/4 stars |
| The New York Times | favorable |
| Rolling Stone | 3/5 stars |
| The Village Voice | favorable |

TP-2.com received mostly positive reviews from music critics. Sonicnet wrote, "TP-2.com isn't the masterpiece Kelly seems capable of, but it's as strong an R&B album as any since, well, since R., balancing the carnal and the spiritual as convincingly as anyone's done it since Prince in the 1980s." Billboard wrote, "Not to be outdone by the generation of singers he has influenced, he raises the bar with the 19-track set." The Village Voice wrote, "TP-2.com is a magnum opus of the genre, milking both Kelly's recent reflection and his baser inclinations for all they're worth." Wall of Sound wrote, "All in all, the production is sharp, with some fairly clever vocal and percussion arrangement ideas throughout." Billboard magazine ranked TP-2.com at number 94 on the magazine's Top 200 Albums of the Decade.

=== Accolades ===
| Year | Awards ceremony | Award | Results |
|---|---|---|---|
| 2000 | American Music Awards | Favorite Male Soul/R&B Artist | Won |
| 2001 | Blockbuster Entertainment Awards | Favorite Male Artist – R&B | Nominated |
| 2001 | Grammy Awards | Best R&B Vocal Performance – Male (for "I Wish") | Nominated |
| 2001 | Mobo Awards | Outstanding Achievement | Won |
| 2001 | MTV Video Music Awards | Best R&B Video (for "I Wish") | Nominated |
| 2000 | NAACP Image Awards | Outstanding Male Artist | Won |
| 2001 | NAACP Image Awards | Outstanding Music Video (for "I Wish") | Won |
| 2001 | Soul Train Music Awards | Best R&B/Soul or Rap Album | Nominated |
| 2001 | Soul Train Music Awards | Best R&B/Soul Single, Male (for "I Wish") | Won |
| 2001 | Soul Train Music Awards | 2001 Best R&B/Soul Album, Male | Won |
| 2001 | Source Awards | R&B Artist of the Year | Won |

== Commercial performance ==
TP-2.com debuted number one on the Billboard 200 and number one on the Top R&B/Hip-Hop Albums chart, with first week sales of 543,000. The album went on to sell over four million copies.

== Track listing ==
| No. | Title | Length |
|---|---|---|
| 1. | "TP-2 (Intro)" | 2:19 |
| 2. | "Strip for You" | 4:10 |
| 3. | "R&B Thug" | 4:04 |
| 4. | "The Greatest Sex" | 4:39 |
| 5. | "I Don't Mean It" | 4:19 |
| 6. | "Just Like That" | 4:34 |
| 7. | "Like a Real Freak" | 4:34 |
| 8. | "Fiesta (Remix)" (featuring Boo & Gotti) | 3:17 |
| 9. | "Don't You Say No" | 4:07 |
| 10. | "The Real R. Kelly (Interlude)" | 0:54 |
| 11. | "One Me" | 3:54 |
| 12. | "I Wish" | 5:34 |
| 13. | "A Woman's Threat" | 5:55 |
| 14. | "I Decided" | 4:12 |
| 15. | "I Mean (I Don't Mean It)" | 3:25 |
| 16. | "I Wish (Remix) / To the Homies That We Lost" | 5:18 |
| 17. | "All I Really Want" | 3:59 |
| 18. | "Feelin' on Yo Booty (R. Kelly's Intro)" | 4:06 |
| 19. | "The Storm Is Over Now" | 4:32 |

== Personnel ==
Credits adapted from AllMusic.

- Boo – guest artist, rap
- Jim Bottari – mixing
- Glen Brown – engineer
- Cheek – engineer
- Joan Collaso – choir, chorus
- Dave Conner – programming
- Alex DeJonge – mixing
- Joe Donatello – engineer, programming
- Bill Douglass – mixing
- Tony Flores – mixing
- Yvonne Gage – choir, chorus
- Andy Gallas – engineer, programming
- Abel Garibaldi – engineer, programming
- Chris Gehringer – mastering
- General – rap
- Gotti – guest artist, rap
- Jessica Janis – children's chorus
- R. Kelly – arranger, mixing, producer, vocals
- Gregg Landfair – guitar
- Jeff Lane – engineer
- James Lee – engineer, programming
- Ron Lowe – mixing
- Donnie Lyle – bass, guitar
- Paul Mabin – choir, chorus
- Tony Maserati – mixing
- Ian Mereness – engineer, programming
- Daniel Milazzo – mixing
- Peter Mokran – mixing
- Nick Monson – engineer
- Amber Morrow – children's chorus
- Jeffrey Morrow – choir, chorus
- Joseph Morrow – children's chorus
- John Nelson – mixing
- Kendall D. Nesbitt – keyboards
- Flip Osman – mixing
- Poke – producer
- Herb Powers – mastering
- Precision – producer
- Paul Riser – string arrangements
- Carl Robinson – engineer
- Leah Robinson – children's chorus
- Matthew Robinson – children's chorus
- Rachel Robinson – children's chorus
- David Swope – mixing
- Doug Swope – mixing
- Cyrille Taillandier – mixing
- Tone – producer
- Richard Travali – mixing
- Jeff Vereb – engineer
- Bill W. – programming
- Jeffrey Walker – engineer, mixing
- Cheryl Wilson – choir, chorus
- Stan Wood – engineer, programming

== Later samples ==
- "The Greatest Sex"
  - "I Smell Pussy" by G-Unit from the album Beg for Mercy
  - "Boyfriend #2" by Pleasure P
- "Fiesta"
  - "We F'd Up" by J Dilla from the album Pay Jay
- "I Wish"
  - "I wish" by 21 Savage from the album What Happened to the Streets?
- "A Woman's Threat"
  - "Threat" by Jay-Z from the album The Black Album
  - "This Is a Warning" by Lil' Kim from the album La Bella Mafia
- "One Me"
  - "I'm a Winner" by Twista from the album The Day After

== Charts ==
=== Weekly charts ===
| Chart (2000) | Peak position |
|---|---|
| Australian Albums (ARIA) | 78 |
| Austrian Albums (Ö3 Austria) | 36 |
| Belgian Albums (Ultratop Flanders) | 43 |
| Belgian Albums (Ultratop Wallonia) | 22 |
| Canadian Albums (Billboard) | 7 |
| Canadian R&B Albums (Nielsen SoundScan) | 1 |
| Dutch Albums (Album Top 100) | 7 |
| French Albums (SNEP) | 4 |
| German Albums (Offizielle Top 100) | 2 |
| Italian Albums (FIMI) | 39 |
| Scottish Albums (Official Charts) | 51 |
| Swedish Albums (Sverigetopplistan) | 23 |
| Swiss Albums (Schweizer Hitparade) | 6 |
| UK Albums (Official Charts) | 21 |
| UK R&B Albums (Official Charts) | 4 |
| UK Independent Albums (Official Charts) | 3 |
| US Top R&B/Hip-Hop Albums (Billboard) | 1 |
| US Billboard 200 | 1 |

=== Year-end charts ===
Year-end chart performance for TP-2.com
| Chart (2000) | Position |
|---|---|
| Canadian Albums (Nielsen SoundScan) | 115 |
| Dutch Albums (Album Top 100) | 77 |
| US Billboard 200 | 168 |
| US Top R&B/Hip-Hop Albums (Billboard) | 61 |

| Chart (2001) | Position |
|---|---|
| Belgian Albums (Ultratop Wallonia) | 76 |
| Canadian Albums (Nielsen SoundScan) | 164 |
| Canadian R&B Albums (Nielsen SoundScan) | 35 |
| French Albums (SNEP) | 127 |
| German Albums (Offizielle Top 100) | 42 |
| US Billboard 200 | 19 |
| US Top R&B/Hip-Hop Albums (Billboard) | 1 |

== Certifications ==
| Region | Certification | Certified units/sales |
|---|---|---|
| Belgium (BRMA) | Gold | 25,000^{*} |
| Canada (Music Canada) | Platinum | 100,000^{^} |
| France (SNEP) | 2× Gold | 200,000^{*} |
| Germany (BVMI) | Gold | 150,000^{^} |
| Netherlands (NVPI) | Gold | 40,000^{^} |
| Switzerland (IFPI Switzerland) | Gold | 25,000^{^} |
| United Kingdom (BPI) | Gold | 100,000^{^} |
| United States (RIAA) | 4× Platinum | 4,000,000^{^} |
^{*} Sales figures based on certification alone.^{^} Shipments figures based on certification alone.

== See also ==
- List of number-one albums of 2000 (U.S.)
- List of number-one R&B albums of 2000 (U.S.)
- Billboard Year-End
- 2000 in music
