= I Wish (R. Kelly song) =

2000 song by R. Kelly

- Standard artwork (U.S. 12-inch vinyl pictured)

Single by R. Kelly

from the album TP-2.com
- Released: September 19, 2000
- Length: 5:34 (album version); 5:16 (radio edit)
- Label: Jive
- Songwriter: Robert Kelly
- Producer: R. Kelly

R. Kelly singles chronology
"Bad Man" (2000)	"I Wish" (2000)	"A Woman's Threat" (2001)

"I Wish – Remix (To the Homies That We Lost)"

Single by R. Kelly featuring Boo & Gotti

from the album TP-2.com
- Released: 2000
- Length: 5:18
- Label: Jive
- Songwriter: Robert Kelly
- Producer: R. Kelly

"I Wish" is a song by American singer-songwriter R. Kelly from his fourth studio album, TP-2.com (2000). It was released as the album's first single on September 19, 2000. It spent three weeks at number one on the US Billboard Hot R&B/Hip-Hop Singles & Tracks chart and peaked at number 14 on the Billboard Hot 100 chart. The song is dedicated to Kelly's mother Joanne as well as friends and other loved ones of his who have died. This song was originally going to feature rapper 2Pac, but he died before recording his verse. The remix, which was titled "I Wish – Remix (To the Homies That We Lost)" features hip-hop duo Boo & Gotti, who were then signed to his Rockland Records imprint.

== Music video ==
The official music video for "I Wish", directed by R. Kelly and Christopher Erskin, complements the song's deeply emotional tone, which is a tribute to lost loved ones. The video features Kelly visiting a cemetery, where he mourns and reflects on the people he has lost in his life, including his mother Joanne and close friends. These visuals align with the song's lyrics, offering a personal glimpse into Kelly’s grief. In various scenes, he is seen walking through his old neighborhood in Chicago, illustrating the connection between his fame, community, and personal struggles.

The video's emotional depth is enhanced by the appearance of Kelly's daughter, Joann, symbolizing the importance of family in the midst of loss. It further reflects Kelly's personal life, grounding the viewer in the reality of his experiences, rather than a purely fictional narrative. The video also includes shots of urban life, invoking themes of remembrance, loyalty, and longing for the past.

Additionally, a remixed version of the video was produced for the track "I Wish – Remix (To the Homies That We Lost)," featuring the hip hop duo Boo & Gotti. This version included extra scenes and performances that expanded the narrative to honor fallen friends within the larger hip hop community, extending the tribute beyond Kelly's personal experiences.

== Awards and nominations ==
- Grammy Awards
  - 2001, Best R&B Vocal Performance – Male (nominated)
- MTV Video Music Awards
  - 2001, Best R&B Video (nominated)
- NAACP Image Awards
  - 2001, Outstanding Music Video (won)
- Soul Train Music Award
  - 2001, Best R&B/Soul Single, Male (won)
- BMI Urban Awards
  - 2001, Most-Performed Song (won)

== Charts ==
=== Weekly charts ===
Chart (2000–2001)	Peak position
Australia (ARIA)	77
Belgium (Ultratip Bubbling Under Flanders)	7
Belgium (Ultratop 50 Wallonia)	36
Canada (Nielsen SoundScan) Import	22
Europe (Eurochart Hot 100)	17
France (SNEP)	40
Germany (GfK)	10
Italy (FIMI)	41
Netherlands (Dutch Top 40)	4
Netherlands (Single Top 100)	6
Scotland Singles (Official Charts)	31
Sweden (Sverigetopplistan)	50
Switzerland (Schweizer Hitparade)	29
UK Singles (Official Charts)	12
UK Dance (Official Charts)	38
UK Hip Hop/R&B (Official Charts)	1
UK Indie (Official Charts)	4
US Billboard Hot 100	14
US Hot R&B/Hip-Hop Songs (Billboard)	1
US Pop Airplay (Billboard)	34
US Rhythmic Airplay (Billboard)	11

=== Year-end charts ===
Chart (2000)	Position
Germany (Media Control)	99
Netherlands (Dutch Top 40)	50
Netherlands (Single Top 100)	52
US Hot R&B/Hip-Hop Singles & Tracks (Billboard)	52

Chart (2001)	Position
US Billboard Hot 100	87
US Hot R&B/Hip-Hop Singles & Tracks (Billboard)	48
US Rhythmic Top 40 (Billboard)	50

== Release history ==
Region	Date	Format(s)	Label(s)	Ref.
United States	September 19, 2000	Rhythmic contemporary; urban adult contemporary radio	Jive	
United Kingdom	October 9, 2000	12-inch vinyl; CD; cassette	Jive	
United States	December 5, 2000	Contemporary hit radio	Jive	
