= List of songs recorded by R. Kelly =

Songs recorded by R. Kelly
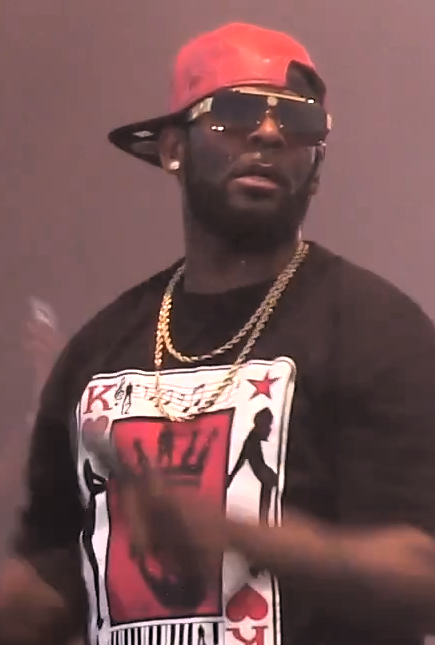
- Released songs: 310

This is a list of songs recorded by R. Kelly.

== Songs ==
Key
†	Indicates single release
#	Indicates promotional single release
‡	Indicates song written solely by Kelly
±	Indicates song produced solely by Kelly

Song	Writer(s)	Producer(s)	Year	Album
"12 Play"	Robert Kelly‡	Robert Kelly; Timmy Allen (co.)	1993	12 Play
"2nd Kelly"	Robert Kelly‡	Robert Kelly±	1998	R.
"3-Way Phone Call" (feat. Kelly Price, Kim Burrell & Maurice Mahon)	Robert Kelly‡	Robert Kelly±	2004	Happy People/U Saved Me
"Africa"	Robert Kelly‡	Robert Kelly±	2005	My Diary
"All I Really Want"	Robert Kelly‡	Robert Kelly±	2000	TP-2.COM
"All My Fault"	Robert Kelly‡	Robert Kelly±	2015	The Buffet
"All Rounds On Me"	Robert Kelly; Dorrell Mays	Robert Kelly; Bigg Makk	2012	Write Me Back
"All The Way" (feat. Kelly Rowland)	Robert Kelly; Sly Jordan	David Anthony; Rich Nice; Robert Kelly	2013	Black Panties
"Anything Goes" (feat. Ty Dolla $ign)	Robert Kelly; Dernst Emile; Tyrone Griffin, Jr.	Robert Kelly; D'Mile	2015	The Buffet
"Apologies of a Thug"	Robert Kelly‡	Robert Kelly±	2002	Loveland (Limited Edition)
"As I Look Into My Life"	Robert Kelly‡	Robert Kelly±	1995	R. Kelly
"Baby, Baby, Baby, Baby, Baby..."	Robert Kelly‡	Robert Kelly±	1995	R. Kelly
"Back To The Hood of Things"	Robert Kelly‡	Robert Kelly±	1993	12 Play
"Backyard Party"†	Robert Kelly‡	Robert Kelly±	2015	The Buffet
"Bad Man"†	Robert Kelly‡	Robert Kelly±	2000	Shaft (Soundtrack)
"Bangin' The Headboard"	Robert Kelly; Darhyl Camper; Infinity; Miguel Jiminez; Sassieon Hill	Darhyl "DJ Camper"; Infinity; Robert Kelly	2009	Untitled
"Barely Breathin'"	Robert Kelly‡	Robert Kelly±	2015	The Buffet (Deluxe Version)
"Be My #2"	Robert Kelly; Jack Splash; Paul Kyser; Leon Stuckey	Jack Splash; Robert Kelly	2009	Untitled
"Beautiful In This Mirror"	Robert Kelly‡	Robert Kelly±	2012	Write Me Back (Deluxe Edition)
"Been Around The World" (feat. Ja Rule)	Robert Kelly‡	Robert Kelly±	2003	Chocolate Factory
"Believe In Me"	Robert Kelly‡	Robert Kelly; J. LBS	2012	Write Me Back
"Believe That It's So"	Robert Kelly‡	Robert Kelly±	2012	Write Me Back
"Best At It"	Robert Kelly‡	Robert Kelly±	2013	Black Panties (Japan Edition)
"Best Friend" (feat. Keyshia Cole and Polow Da Don)	Robert Kelly‡	Robert Kelly±	2007	Double Up
"Bump N' Grind"†	Robert Kelly‡	Robert Kelly±	1993	12 Play
"Burn It Up" (feat. Wisin and Yandell)†	Robert Kelly; Luny Tunes; Wisin and Yandell	Luny Tunes; Robert Kelly (co.)	2005	TP.3 Reloaded
"Can You Feel It"	Robert Kelly‡	Robert Kelly±	2010	Epic
"The Champ" (feat. Swizz Beatz)	Robert Kelly‡	Robert Kelly±	2007	Double Up
"The Chase"	Robert Kelly‡	Robert Kelly±	1998	R.
"Chocolate Factory"	Robert Kelly‡	Robert Kelly±	2003	Chocolate Factory
"Circles"	Robert Kelly‡	Robert Kelly±	2013	Black Panties (Japan Edition)
"Clipped Wings"	Robert Kelly; Warryn Campbell	Robert Kelly; Warryn Campbell	2012	Write Me Back
"Cookie"†	Robert Kelly; J. Angel; Winfred Crabtree II; Rebecca Johnson; Aaron Revelle; Destin Resa Mungall	Win; T. Newsome; Rahk; Destin; Robert Kelly	2013	Black Panties
"Crazy Night" (feat. R. City)	Robert Kelly; Ronnie Jackson; Timothy Thomas; Theron Thomas; Maurice Simmonds	Lil Ronnie; Robert Kelly	2009	Untitled
"Crazy Sex"	Robert Kelly; Ron LaTour; Brock Korsan	Cardo; Robert Kelly	2013	Black Panties
"Dancing With A Rich Man"	Robert Kelly‡	Robert Kelly±	1998	R.
"The Diary of Me"	Robert Kelly‡	Robert Kelly±	2004	Happy People/U Saved Me
"Did You Ever Think"†	Robert Kelly; Curtis Mayfield; J.C. Olivier; S. Barnes	Robert Kelly; Tone and Poke; Corey Rooney (co.)	1998	R.
"Dollar Bill" (feat. Foxy Brown)	Robert Kelly; J.C. Olivier; I. Marchand; S. Barnes; S. Otis	Robert Kelly; Tone and Poke; Al West (co.)	1998	R.
"Don't Put Me Out"	Robert Kelly‡	Robert Kelly±	1998	R.
"Don't You Say No"	Robert Kelly‡	Robert Kelly±	2000	TP-2.COM
"Double Up" (feat. Snoop Dogg)	Robert Kelly; Calvin Broadus; Charlene Keys; Nisan Stewart; Craig Brockman; Charles Bereal	Robert Kelly; Khao (co.)	2007	Double Up
"Down Low (Nobody Has to Know)"†	Robert Kelly‡	Robert Kelly±	1995	R. Kelly
"Down Low Double Life"	Robert Kelly‡	Robert Kelly±	1998	R.
"Dream Girl"	Robert Kelly‡	Robert Kelly±	2003	Chocolate Factory
"Echo"	Robert Kelly; Infinity; Darhyl Camper; Claude Kelly	Infinity; Darhyl "DJ Camper"; Robert Kelly	2009	Untitled
"Elsewhere"	Robert Kelly; Chris Henderson	Christopher 'Deep' Henderson; Robert Kelly	2009	Untitled
"Etcetera"	Robert Kelly‡	Robert Kelly±	1998	R.
"Every Position"	Robert Kelly; Nayvadius Wilburn; Dennis-Manuel Peters; Daniel Coriglie; Mario Bakovic	T-Town Productions; Robert Kelly	2013	Black Panties (Deluxe Edition)
"Exit"	Robert Kelly; Phalon Alexander; Larry Nix; Kassim Vonricco Washington	Jazze Pha; Robert Kelly	2009	Untitled
"Fallin' from the Sky"	Robert Kelly; Dennis-Manuel Peters; Mario Bakovic; Daniel Corigile; Shaun Harris	T-Town Productions; Robert Kelly	2009	Untitled (UK Edition); Write Me Back (Deluxe Edition)
"Fallin' Hearts"	Robert Kelly‡	Robert Kelly±	2010	Love Letter (Best Buy Exclusive) / (Japan Version)
"Far More"	Robert Kelly‡	Robert Kelly±	2002	Loveland (Limited Edition)
"Feelin' on Yo Booty"†	Robert Kelly‡	Robert Kelly±	2000	TP-2.COM
"Feelin' Single"†	Robert Kelly‡	Robert Kelly; Bigg Makk	2012	Write Me Back
"Fiesta" (feat. Boo & Gotti)†	Robert Kelly‡	Tone and Poke; Precision	2000	TP-2.COM
"Fireworks"	Robert Kelly‡	Robert Kelly±	2010	Epic
"Fool For You"	Robert Kelly‡	Robert Kelly±	2012	Write Me Back
"For You"	Robert Kelly‡	Robert Kelly±	1993	12 Play
"Forever"	Robert Kelly‡	Robert Kelly±	2003	Chocolate Factory
"Forever More"	Robert Kelly‡	Robert Kelly±	2003	Chocolate Factory
"Freak Dat Body"	Robert Kelly‡	Robert Kelly±	1993	12 Play
"Freak Tonight"	Robert Kelly‡	Robert Kelly±	1996	A Thin Line Between Love and Hate (Original Soundtrack)
"Freaky In The Club"	Robert Kelly‡	Robert Kelly±	2007	Double Up
"Genius"†	Robert Kelly; Dorrell Mays	Bigg Makk; Robert Kelly	2013	Black Panties
"Get Dirty" (feat. Chamillionaire)	Robert Kelly; H. Seriki	Robert Kelly; Mysto & Pizzi (co.)	2007	Double Up
"Get Out of Here With Me"	Robert Kelly; Donnie Lyle	Robert Kelly; Donnie Lyle	2015	The Buffet
"Get Up On A Room"	Robert Kelly‡	Robert Kelly±	1998	R.
"Ghetto Queen" (feat. Crucial Conflict)	Robert Kelly; W. Martin; M. King; C. Johnson; R. Leverston	Robert Kelly±	1998	R.
"Ghetto Religion" (feat. Wyclef Jean)	Robert Kelly; Wyclef Jean; Jerry "Wonder" Duplessis	Robert Kelly; Wyclef Jean; Jerry "Wonder" Duplessis	2003	The R. in R&B Collection, Vol. 1
"Girls Go Crazy" (feat. Baby)	Robert Kelly; B. Williams	Robert Kelly±	2005	TP.3 Reloaded
"Go Low"	Robert Kelly‡	Robert Kelly±	2009	Untitled
"Gotham City"†	Robert Kelly‡	Robert Kelly±	1997	Batman & Robin (Original Soundtrack); R. (International Edition)
"The Greatest Sex"	Robert Kelly‡	Robert Kelly±	2000	TP-2.COM
"The Greatest Show On Earth"	Robert Kelly‡	Robert Kelly±	2004	Happy People/U Saved Me
"Green Light"	Robert Kelly‡	Robert Kelly±	2012	Write Me Back
"Half on a Baby"†	Robert Kelly‡	Robert Kelly±	1998	R.
"Happy People"†	Robert Kelly‡	Robert Kelly±	2004	Happy People/U Saved Me
"Happy Summertime" (feat. Snoop Dogg)	Robert Kelly; Calvin Broadus	Robert Kelly±	2005	TP.3 Reloaded
"Havin' A Baby"	Robert Kelly‡	Robert Kelly±	2007	Double Up
"Heal It (Prelude)"	Robert Kelly‡	Robert Kelly±	2010	Epic
"Heart Of A Woman"	Robert Kelly‡	Robert Kelly±	2003	Chocolate Factory
"Heaven I Need a Hug"	Robert Kelly‡	Robert Kelly±	2002	Loveland (Limited Edition)
"Heaven If You Hear Me"	Robert Kelly‡	Robert Kelly±	1995	R. Kelly
"Hit It Til The Mornin'" (feat. Twista and Do Or Die)	Robert Kelly; Mitchell Carl Terrell; Dennis Round; Darnel Smith	Robert Kelly±	2005	TP.3 Reloaded
"Hold On"	Robert Kelly‡	Robert Kelly±	2001	Ali (Original Soundtrack)
"Home Alone" (feat. Keith Murray)†	Robert Kelly; Kelly Price; Keith Murray	G-One	1998	R.
"Homie Lover Friend"	Robert Kelly‡	Robert Kelly; Timmy Allen (co.)	1993	12 Play
"Hook It Up" (feat. Huey)	Robert Kelly‡	Robert Kelly±	2007	Double Up
"How Did You Manage"	Robert Kelly‡	Robert Kelly±	2004	Happy People/U Saved Me
"How Do I Tell Her"	Robert Kelly‡	Robert Kelly±	2010	Love Letter
"Hump Bounce"	Robert Kelly‡	Robert Kelly±	1995	R. Kelly
"I Admit"	Robert Kelly; Raphael Ramos Oliveira	Robert Kelly; Noc	2018	non-album release
"I Believe"	Robert Kelly‡	Robert Kelly±	2008	Epic
"I Believe I Can Fly"†	Robert Kelly‡	Robert Kelly±	1996	Space Jam (Soundtrack); R.
"I Can't Sleep Baby (If I)"†	Robert Kelly‡	Robert Kelly±	1995	R. Kelly
"I Decided"	Robert Kelly‡	Robert Kelly±	2000	TP-2.COM
"I Don't Mean It"	Robert Kelly‡	Robert Kelly±	2000	TP-2.COM
"I Just Want to Thank You" (feat. Wizkid)"	Robert Kelly; Brandon Green; Ayodeji Ibrahim Balogun	Robert Kelly; Maejor	2015	The Buffet (Deluxe Version)
"I Know You Are Hurting (Tribute to the Newton, Ct. Kids)"	Robert Kelly‡	Robert Kelly±	2013	I Know You Are Hurting (Tribute to the Newton, Ct. Kids)
"I Like Love"	Robert Kelly‡	Robert Kelly±	2007	Double Up (Japan/Canada Edition)
"I Like The Crotch On You"	Robert Kelly‡	Robert Kelly±	1993	12 Play
"I Love The DJ"	Robert Kelly; Carsten Shack; Kenneth Karlin; Rob Allen	Soulshock; Karlin; Robert Kelly	2009	Untitled
"I Mean (I Don't Mean It)"	Robert Kelly‡	Robert Kelly±	2000	TP-2.COM
"I Surrender"	Robert Kelly‡	Robert Kelly±	2004	Happy People/U Saved Me
"I Tried"	Robert Kelly; Dorrell Mays	Robert Kelly; Big Makk	2015	The Buffet (Deluxe Version)
"I Wish"†	Robert Kelly‡	Robert Kelly±	2000	TP-2.COM
"If"	Robert Kelly‡	Robert Kelly±	2004	Happy People/U Saved Me
"If I Could Make the World Dance"	Robert Kelly‡	Robert Kelly±	2004	Happy People/U Saved Me
"If I Could Turn Back the Hands of Time"†	Robert Kelly‡	Robert Kelly±	1998	R.
"If I'm Wit You"	Robert Kelly; Curtis Mayfield; J.C. Oliver; N. Robinson; K. Robinson; S. Barnes	Robert Kelly; Tone and Poke (co.)	1998	R.
"Ignition"	Robert Kelly‡	Robert Kelly±	2003	Chocolate Factory
"Ignition (Remix)"†	Robert Kelly‡	Robert Kelly±	2003	Chocolate Factory
"I'll Never Leave"	Robert Kelly‡	Robert Kelly±	2003	Chocolate Factory
"I'm a Flirt (Remix)"†	Robert Kelly; Shad Moss; Ronnie Jackson; Clifford Harris; Faheem Najm	Robert Kelly±	2007	Double Up
"I'm Your Angel" Duet with Celine Dion†	Robert Kelly‡	Robert Kelly±	1998	R.
"Imagine That"	Robert Kelly‡	Robert Kelly±	2003	Chocolate Factory
"In the Kitchen"†	Robert Kelly‡	Robert Kelly±	2005	TP.3 Reloaded
"The Interview" (feat. Suzanne LeMignot)	Robert Kelly‡	Robert Kelly±	1998	R.
"Intro - the Sermon"	Robert Kelly‡	Robert Kelly±	1995	R. Kelly
"It Seems Like You're Ready"	Robert Kelly‡	Robert Kelly±	1993	12 Play
"It's Your Birthday"	Robert Kelly‡	Robert Kelly±	2004	Happy People/U Saved Me
"Just Can't Get Enough"	Robert Kelly‡	Robert Kelly±	2010	Love Letter
"Just Like That"	Robert Kelly‡	Robert Kelly±	2010	Love Letter
"Just Like That"	Robert Kelly‡	Robert Kelly±	2000	TP-2.COM
"Keep Searchin'"	Robert Kelly‡	Robert Kelly±	2015	The Buffet (Deluxe Version)
"Kickin' It With Your Girlfriend"	Robert Kelly‡	Robert Kelly±	2005	TP.3 Reloaded
"Ladies' Night (Treat Her Like Heaven)"	Robert Kelly‡	Robert Kelly±	2004	Happy People/U Saved Me
"Lady Sunday"	Robert Kelly‡	Robert Kelly±	2012	Write Me Back
"Leap Of Faith"	Robert Kelly‡	Robert Kelly±	2004	Happy People/U Saved Me
"Legs Shakin'" (feat. Ludacris)†	Robert Kelly; Christopher Bridges; Lamar "Marz" Edwards	Marz; Robert Kelly	2013	Black Panties
"Let Your Light Shine"	Robert Kelly‡	Robert Kelly±	2005	Let Your Light Shine; Hurricane Relief: Come Together Now
"Let's Be Real Now" (feat. Tinashe)	Robert Kelly; Magnus August Høiberg; Joshua Coleman; Tinashe Kachingwe	Robert Kelly; Cashmere Cat; Ammo	2015	The Buffet
"Let's Make Some Noise" (feat. Jhené Aiko)	Robert Kelly; Keyel Walker; Jhené Aiko; Anton Alexander; Johntá Austin; Bryan-Michael Cox; Kevin Hicks	Robert Kelly; Keyel Walker	2015	The Buffet
"Like A Real Freak"	Robert Kelly‡	Robert Kelly±	2000	TP-2.COM
"Like I Do"	Robert Kelly; Carlos McKinney; Claude Kelly	LOS Da Mystro; Robert Kelly	2009	Untitled
"Looking for Love"	Robert Kelly‡	Robert Kelly±	1998	R.
"Lost In Your Love"	Robert Kelly‡	Robert Kelly±	2010	Love Letter
"Love Is"	Robert Kelly‡	Robert Kelly±	2012	Write Me Back
"Love Is" (feat. K. Michelle)	Robert Kelly‡	Robert Kelly±	2010	Love Letter
"Love Is On The Way"	Robert Kelly‡	Robert Kelly±	1995	R. Kelly
"Love Letter"†	Robert Kelly‡	Robert Kelly±	2010	Love Letter
"A Love Letter Christmas"	Robert Kelly‡	Robert Kelly±	2010	Love Letter
"Love Letter (Prelude)"	Robert Kelly‡	Robert Kelly±	2010	Love Letter
"Love Signals"	Robert Kelly‡	Robert Kelly±	2004	Happy People/U Saved Me
"Love Street"	Robert Kelly‡	Robert Kelly±	2004	Happy People/U Saved Me
"Loveland"	Robert Kelly‡	Robert Kelly±	2002	Loveland (Limited Edition)
"Marching Band" (feat. Juicy J)	Robert Kelly; Jordan Houston; Lukasz Gottwald; Jeremy Coleman; Gamal "Lunchmoney" Lewis; Ryan Ogren; Samuel Alexander; Castillo Vasquez	Dr. Luke; Cirkut and A.C; JMIKE; Robert Kelly	2015	The Buffet
"Marry the Pussy"	Robert Kelly; Antonio Brown	Beat Mechanix; Robert Kelly	2013	Black Panties
"Money Makes The World Go Round" (feat. Nas)	Robert Kelly; A. Barnes; J. Malone; N. Jones	Robert Kelly; Tone and Poke (co.)	1998	R.
"Music Must Be a Lady"	Robert Kelly‡	Robert Kelly±	2010	Love Letter
"My Story" (feat. 2 Chainz)†	Robert Kelly; Paul Jefferies; Tauheed Epps	Nineteen85; Robert Kelly	2013	Black Panties
"Naked"	Robert Kelly‡	Robert Kelly±	2002	The Best of Both Worlds
"Not Feelin' The Love"	Robert Kelly‡	Robert Kelly±	2010	Love Letter
"Not Gonna Hold On"	Robert Kelly‡	Robert Kelly±	1995	R. Kelly
"Number One" (feat. Keri Hilson)†	Robert Kelly; Raphael Hamilton; Roy Hamilton; Keri Hilson	Robert Kelly; Roy Hamilton; Raphael Hamilton	2009	Untitled
"Number One Hit"	Robert Kelly‡	Robert Kelly±	2010	Love Letter
"One Man"	Robert Kelly‡	Robert Kelly±	1998	R.
"One Me"	Robert Kelly‡	Robert Kelly±	2000	TP-2.COM
"One Step Closer"	Robert Kelly‡	Robert Kelly±	2012	Write Me Back (Deluxe Edition)
"Only The Loot Can Make Me Happy"†	Robert Kelly; J. Oliver; S. Barnes; D. Townsend; D. Conley; B. Jackson	Robert Kelly; Tone and Poke (co.)	1998	R.
"The Opera"	Robert Kelly‡	Robert Kelly±	1998	R.
"Party Jumpin'"	Robert Kelly‡	Robert Kelly±	2012	Write Me Back
"Peace"	Robert Kelly‡	Robert Kelly±	2004	Happy People/U Saved Me
"Physical"	Robert Kelly; Tony Scales; John McGee	Chef Tone; John "SK" McGee; Robert Kelly	2013	Black Panties (Deluxe Edition)
"Playa's Only" (feat. The Game)†	Scott Storch; Robert Kelly; Jayceon Taylor	Scott Storch; Robert Kelly	2005	TP.3 Reloaded
"The Poem"	Robert Kelly‡	Robert Kelly±	2015	The Buffet
"Poetic Sex"	Robert Kelly; Samuel Hindes; Mikano F. Fayette; Firman Guion	Robert Kelly; Samuel Hindes	2015	The Buffet
"Prayer Changes"	Robert Kelly‡	Robert Kelly±	2004	Happy People/U Saved Me
"Pregnant" (feat. Tyrese, Robin Thicke and The-Dream)	Robert Kelly; Berris Bolton; Leon DeWayne Swan; Terius Nash	Berris Bolton; DeWayne Swan; Robert Kelly	2009	Untitled
"Put My T-Shirt On"	Robert Kelly‡	Robert Kelly±	2005	TP.3 Reloaded
"R&B Thug"	Robert Kelly‡	Robert Kelly±	2000	TP-2.COM
"Radio Message"†	Robert Kelly‡	Robert Kelly±	2010	Love Letter
"Raindrops"	Robert Kelly‡	Robert Kelly±	2002	Loveland (Limited Edition)
"The Real R. Kelly"	Robert Kelly‡	Robert Kelly±	2000	TP-2.COM
"Real Talk"	Robert Kelly‡	Robert Kelly±	2007	Double Up
"Reality"	Robert Kelly‡	Robert Kelly±	1998	R.
"Red Carpet (Pause, Flash)"	Robert Kelly‡	Robert Kelly±	2004	Happy People/U Saved Me
"Reggae Bump Bump" (feat. Elephant Man)	Robert Kelly; O'Neil Bryan	Robert Kelly±	2005	TP.3 Reloaded
"Relief"	Robert Kelly‡	Robert Kelly±	2008	Love Letter (Japan Version)
"Religious"†	Robert Kelly; Eric Dawkins; Antonio Dixon; Warryn Campbell; Tyrese Gibson	Eric Dawkins; Antonio Dixon; Robert Kelly	2009	Untitled
"Religious Love"	Robert Kelly‡	Robert Kelly±	1995	R. Kelly
"Remote Control"	Robert Kelly‡	Robert Kelly±	2005	TP.3 Reloaded
"Right Back"	Robert Kelly‡	Darrick "Devyne" Stephens; Christopher Clark; Robert Kelly	2013	Black Panties
"Ringtone"	Robert Kelly; Jamal Jones; William Hodge II; Terius Nash	Robert Kelly; Polow da Don	2007	Double Up (International Edition)
"Rise Up"	Robert Kelly‡	Robert Kelly±	2007	Double Up
"Rock Star" (feat. Ludacris and Kid Rock)†	Robert Kelly; Christopher Bridges	Robert Kelly±	2007	Double Up
"Rollin'"	Robert Kelly‡	Robert Kelly±	2007	Double Up
"Sadie"	Joseph B. Jefferson; Bruce Hawes; Charles Simmons	Robert Kelly±	1993	12 Play
"Same Girl" Duet with Usher†	Robert Kelly; Ronnie Jackson; J. Smith	Lil' Ronnie; Robert Kelly	2007	Double Up
"(Sex) Love Is What We Makin'"	Robert Kelly‡	Robert Kelly±	2005	TP.3 Reloaded
"Sex Me, Pt. 1 & 2"†	Robert Kelly‡	Robert Kelly±	1993	12 Play
"Sex Planet"	Robert Kelly‡	Robert Kelly±	2007	Double Up
"Sex Weed"	Robert Kelly‡	Robert Kelly±	2005	TP.3 Reloaded
"Sextime"	Robert Kelly; Dorrell Mays; Andre Manuel	Robert Kelly; Bigg Makk; Andre Manuel	2015	The Buffet
"Share My Love"†	Robert Kelly‡	Robert Kelly±	2012	Write Me Back
"Show Ya Pussy" (feat. Migos & Juicy J)	Robert Kelly; Donnie Lyle; Quavious Marshall; Kirksnick Ball; Jordan Houston	Donnie Lyle; Robert Kelly	2013	Black Panties
"Showdown" (feat. Ronald Isley)	Robert Kelly‡	Robert Kelly±	2003	Chocolate Factory
"Shut Up"	Robert Kelly; Dorrell Mays	Bigg Makk; Robert Kelly	2013	Black Panties
"Sign of a Victory" (feat. Soweto Spiritual Singers)	Robert Kelly‡	Robert Kelly±	2010	Listen Up! The Official 2010 FIFA World Cup; Epic
"Slow Wind"	Robert Kelly‡	Robert Kelly±	2005	TP.3 Reloaded
"Snake"	Robert Kelly‡	Robert Kelly±	2003	Chocolate Factory
"Soldier's Heart"	Robert Kelly‡	Robert Kelly±	2001	Soldier's Heart (Single)
"Spend That" (feat. Jeezy)	Robert Kelly; Dijon McFarlane; Mikely Adam; Jay Jenkins	Dijon "DJ Mustard" McFarlane; Mikely Adam; Robert Kelly	2013	Black Panties
"Spendin' Money"	Robert Kelly; R. Lawrence; S. Combs; S. Jordan; K. Price; D. Romani	Sean "Puffy" Combs; Ron "Amen-Ra" Lawrence; Stevie J. (co.)	1998	R.
"Spirit"	Robert Kelly‡	Robert Kelly±	2004	Happy People/U Saved Me
"Step In My Room"	Robert Kelly‡	Robert Kelly±	1995	R. Kelly
"Step In The Name of Love"†	Robert Kelly‡	Robert Kelly±	2003	Chocolate Factory
"Steppin' Into Heaven"	Robert Kelly‡	Robert Kelly±	2004	Happy People/U Saved Me
"The Storm Is Over Now"†	Robert Kelly‡	Robert Kelly±	2000	TP-2.COM
"Strip For You"	Robert Kelly‡	Robert Kelly±	2000	TP-2.COM
"Sufferin'"	Robert Kelly‡	Robert Kelly±	2015	The Buffet (Deluxe Version)
"Suicide"	Robert Kelly‡	Robert Kelly±	1998	R.
"Summer Bunnies"†	Robert Kelly‡	Robert Kelly; Timmy Allen (co.)	1993	12 Play
"Supaman High" (feat. OJ Da Juiceman)#	Robert Kelly; Otis Williams, Jr. Radric Davis; William Hodge II	Willy Will; Robert Kelly	2009	Untitled
"Sweet Tooth"	Robert Kelly‡	Robert Kelly±	2007	Double Up
"Switch Up" (feat. Lil Wayne & Jeremih)†	Robert Kelly; Jordan Holt; Cem Tomak; Dwayne Carter, Jr. Jeremih Felton; Matthew Coleman; Lisa Antwil; Richard Maclean	Robert Kelly; J Holt; Cem T	2015	The Buffet
"Taxi Driver"	Robert Kelly‡	Robert Kelly±	2010	Love Letter
"Tear It Up" (feat. Future)	Robert Kelly; Nayvadius Wilburn; Dennis-Manuel Peters; Daniel Coriglie; Mario Bakovic	T-Town Productions; Robert Kelly	2013	Black Panties
"Tempo Slow"	Robert Kelly‡	Robert Kelly±	1995	R. Kelly
"Thank God It's Friday"†	Robert Kelly‡	Robert Kelly±	1995	R. Kelly
"Thoia Thoing"†	Robert Kelly‡	Robert Kelly±	2003	The R. in R&B Collection, Vol. 1
"Throw This Money On You"	Robert Kelly; Nayvadius Wilburn; Dennis-Manuel Peters; Daniel Coriglie; Mario Bakovic	T-Town Productions; Robert Kelly	2013	Black Panties
"Touched A Dream"	Robert Kelly‡	Robert Kelly±	2003	The R. in R&B Collection, Vol. 1
"Touchin'" (feat. Nivea)	Robert Kelly‡	Robert Kelly±	2005	TP.3 Reloaded
"TP-2"	Robert Kelly‡	Robert Kelly±	2000	TP-2.COM
"Trade In My Life"	Robert Kelly‡	Robert Kelly±	1995	R. Kelly
"Tryin' to Get a Number" (feat. Nelly)	Robert Kelly; Cornell Hayes	Robert Kelly; Corey "Keyz" Martin	2007	Double Up
"U Saved Me"†	Robert Kelly‡	Robert Kelly±	2004	Happy People/U Saved Me
"Up and Outta Here"	Robert Kelly‡	Robert Kelly±	2000	Shaft (Soundtrack)
"V.I.P."	Robert Kelly; DeVante Swing; Dalvin DeGrate	Robert Kelly±	1998	R.
"Victory"	Robert Kelly‡	Robert Kelly±	2010	Epic
"Wake Up Everybody"	Robert Kelly‡	Robert Kelly±	2015	The Buffet
"Wanna Be There" (feat. Ariirayé)	Robert Kelly; Larry Griffin Jr. Stuart Lowery	Robert Kelly; S1; Epikh Pro	2015	The Buffet
"We Ride" (feat. Cam'Ron, Noreaga, Jay-Z and Vegas Cats)	Robert Kelly; C. Giles; V. Santiago; S. Carter; Vegas Cats; C. Broadus; A. Young; H. Casey; R. Finch; S. Barnes; J. Oliver; C. Rooney	Robert Kelly; Tone and Poke; Cory Rooney (co.)	1998	R.
"Weatherman"	Robert Kelly‡	Robert Kelly±	2004	Happy People/U Saved Me
"What Do I Do"	Robert Kelly‡	Robert Kelly±	2002	Loveland (Limited Edition)
"What I Feel / Issues"	Robert Kelly‡	Robert Kelly±	1998	R.
"When A Man Lies"†	Robert Kelly‡	Robert Kelly±	2012	Write Me Back
"When a Woman Loves"†	Robert Kelly‡	Robert Kelly±	2010	Love Letter
"When A Woman's Fed Up"†	Robert Kelly‡	Robert Kelly±	1998	R.
"When I Think About You"	Robert Kelly‡	Robert Kelly±	2004	Happy People/U Saved Me
"Who's That" (feat. Fat Joe)	Robert Kelly; Joseph Cartagena	Robert Kelly±	2003	Chocolate Factory
"A Woman's Threat"†	Robert Kelly‡	Robert Kelly±	2000	TP-2.COM
"The World's Greatest"†	Robert Kelly‡	Robert Kelly±	2001	Ali (Original Soundtrack); Loveland (Limited Edition)
"You Are My World"	Robert Kelly‡	Robert Kelly±	2012	Write Me Back (Deluxe Edition)
"You Are Not Alone"	Robert Kelly‡	Robert Kelly±	2010	Love Letter (Deluxe Edition)
"You Deserve Better"	Robert Kelly; Nayvadius Wilburn; Dennis-Manuel Peters; Daniel Coriglie; Mario Bakovic	T-Town Productions; Robert Kelly	2013	Black Panties
"You Knock Me Out"	Robert Kelly‡	Robert Kelly±	2003	Chocolate Factory
"You Made Me Love You"	Robert Kelly‡	Robert Kelly±	2003	Chocolate Factory
"You Remind Me of Something"†	Robert Kelly‡	Robert Kelly±	1995	R. Kelly
"(You To Be) Be Happy" (feat. The Notorious B.I.G.)	Robert Kelly; Christopher Wallace	Robert Kelly±	1995	R. Kelly
"Your Body's Callin'"†	Robert Kelly‡	Robert Kelly; Timmy Allen (co.)	1993	12 Play
"The Zoo"	Robert Kelly‡	Robert Kelly±	2007	Double Up

=== Collaborations ===
Song	Writer(s)	Producer(s)	Year	Album
"The Best of Both Worlds" with Jay-Z	Robert Kelly; Shawn Carter; Dorsey Wesley	Megahertz	2002	The Best of Both Worlds
"Big Chips" with Jay-Z†	Robert Kelly; Shawn Carter	Poke and Tone; Alexander Mosley (co.)	2004	Unfinished Business
"Break Up (That's All We Do)" with Jay-Z	Robert Kelly; Shawn Carter	Robert Kelly	2004	Unfinished Business
"Break Up To Make Up" with Jay-Z	Robert Kelly; Shawn Carter	Robert Kelly	2002	The Best of Both Worlds
"Born Into the 90's" with Public Announcement	Robert Kelly‡	Robert Kelly±	1992	Born Into the 90's
"Dedicated" with Public Announcement†	Robert Kelly‡	Robert Kelly±	1992	Born Into the 90's
"Definition of a Hotti" with Public Announcement	Robert Kelly‡	Robert Kelly±	1992	Born Into the 90's
"Don't Let Me Die" with Jay-Z	Robert Kelly; Shawn Carter	Robert Kelly	2004	Unfinished Business
"Feelin' You in Stereo" with Jay-Z	Robert Kelly; Shawn Carter	Robert Kelly	2004	Unfinished Business
"Get This Money" with Jay-Z	Robert Kelly; Shawn Carter	Robert Kelly; Tone (co.)	2002	The Best of Both Worlds
"Green Light" with Jay-Z (feat. Beanie Sigel)	Robert Kelly; Shawn Carter; Dwight Grant	Robert Kelly; Tone (co.)	2002	The Best of Both Worlds
"Hangin' Out" with Public Announcement	Robert Kelly‡	Robert Kelly±	1992	Born Into the 90's
"Hey Love (Can I Have a Word)" with Public Announcement (feat. Mr. Lee)†	Robert Kelly; Morris Broadnax; Lee Haggard; Clarence Paul; Wayne Williams; Stevie Wonder	Mr. Lee; Wayne Williams; Robert Kelly	1992	Born Into the 90's
"Honey" with Jay-Z†	Robert Kelly; Shawn Carter; S. Barnes; J.C. Olivier; M. Gibb; B. Gibb; R. Gibb	Poke and Tone; Robert Kelly	2002	The Best of Both Worlds
"Honey Love" with Public Announcement†	Robert Kelly‡	Robert Kelly±	1992	Born Into the 90's
"I Know What You Need" with Public Announcement	Robert Kelly‡	Robert Kelly±	1992	Born Into the 90's
"It Ain't Personal" with Jay-Z	Robert Kelly; Shawn Carter	Robert Kelly	2002	The Best of Both Worlds
"Keep It Street" with Public Announcement	Robert Kelly‡	Robert Kelly±	1992	Born Into the 90's
"Mo' Money" with Jay-Z (feat. Twista)	Robert Kelly; Shawn Carter	Robert Kelly	2004	Unfinished Business
"Pretty Girls" with Jay-Z	Robert Kelly; Shawn Carter	Robert Kelly	2004	Unfinished Business
"Pussy" with Jay-Z (feat. Devin the Dude)	Robert Kelly; Shawn Carter	Robert Kelly	2002	The Best of Both Worlds
"The Return" with Jay-Z	Robert Kelly; Shawn Carter	Robert Kelly	2004	Unfinished Business
"Shake Ya Body" with Jay-Z (feat. Lil Kim)	Robert Kelly; Shawn Carter	Robert Kelly	2002	The Best of Both Worlds
"She's Coming Home With Me" with Jay-Z	Robert Kelly; Shawn Carter	Robert Kelly	2004	Unfinished Business
"She's Got That Vibe" with Public Announcement†	Robert Kelly‡	Robert Kelly±	1992	Born Into the 90's
"She's Loving Me" with Public Announcement	Robert Kelly‡	Robert Kelly±	1992	Born Into the 90's
"Shorty" with Jay-Z	Robert Kelly; Shawn Carter; S. Barnes; J.C. Olivier	Robert Kelly; Poke and Tone	2002	The Best of Both Worlds
"Slow Dance" with Public Announcement†	Robert Kelly‡	Robert Kelly±	1992	Born Into the 90's
"Somebody's Girl" with Jay-Z	Robert Kelly; Shawn Carter	Poke and Tone; Robert Kelly	2002	The Best of Both Worlds
"Stop" with Jay-Z (feat. Foxy Brown)	Robert Kelly; Shawn Carter	Robert Kelly	2004	Unfinished Business
"The Streets" with Jay-Z	Robert Kelly; Shawn Carter	Robert Kelly±	2002	The Best of Both Worlds
"Take You Home With Me aka Body" with Jay-Z	Robert Kelly; Shawn Carter	Robert Kelly	2002	The Best of Both Worlds
"We Got 'Em Goin" with Jay-Z (feat. Memphis Bleek)	Robert Kelly; Shawn Carter; Malik Cox	Tone; Robert Kelly	2004	Unfinished Business

== Features ==
Song	Writer(s)	Producer(s)	Year	Album
"Actress" Ty Dolla $ign (feat. R. Kelly)	Tyrone Griffin, Jr. Robert Kelly; Emile II	D'Mile	2015	Free TC
"All Of My Days" Changing Faces (feat. Jay-Z)	Robert Kelly; Shawn Carter	Robert Kelly±	1996	Space Jam (Soundtrack); All Day, All Night
"All The Above" Beanie Sigel (feat. R. Kelly)†	Dwight Grant; Robert Kelly; The Runners	The Runners	2007	The Solution
"Be Careful" Sparkle (feat. R. Kelly)†	Robert Kelly‡	Robert Kelly±	1998	Sparkle
"Be My Lady" Whodini (feat. R. Kelly)	Robert Kelly‡	Robert Kelly±	1996	Six
"Betcha Gon' Know" Mariah Carey (feat. R. Kelly)	Mariah Carey; Christopher Stewart; Terius Nash; James Wright; Robert Kelly	Mariah Carey; Christopher "Tricky" Stewart; Terius "The-Dream" Nash; James "Big Jim" Wright	2014	Me. I Am Mariah... The Elusive Chanteuse (Deluxe Edition)
"Calling All Girls" ATL (feat. R. Kelly)	Robert Kelly‡	Robert Kelly±	2004	The ATL Project
"Contagious" The Isley Brothers (feat. R. Kelly and Chanté Moore)†	Robert Kelly‡	Robert Kelly±	2001	Eternal
"Do What U Want" Lady Gaga (feat. R. Kelly)†	Stefani Germanotta; Paul Blair; Robert Kelly; Martin Bresso; William Grigahcine	DJ White Shadow; Lady Gaga	2013	Artpop
"Drown In It" Chris Brown (feat. R. Kelly)†	Christopher Brown; Robert Kelly	T-Town Productions; Robert Kelly	2014	X
"Gangsta Girl" Big Tymers (feat. R. Kelly)†	Robert Kelly‡	Robert Kelly±	2003	Big Money Heavyweight
"Gigolo" Nick Cannon (feat. R. Kelly)†	Robert Kelly; Nick Cannon	Robert Kelly±	2003	Nick Cannon
"Glory to the Lord" King Los (feat. R. Kelly)†	Carlos Coleman; Robert Kelly	Da Internz	2015	God, Money, War
"Go Getta" Young Jeezy (feat. R. Kelly)†	Robert Kelly	The Runners	2007	The Inspiration
"Hypnotic" Syleena Johnson (feat. R. Kelly & Fabolous )	Robert Kelly; John Jackson	Robert Kelly±	2005	Chapter 3: The Flesh
"It's On" Mary J. Blige (feat. R. Kelly)	Robert Kelly‡	Robert Kelly±	1997	Share My World
"It's Your World" Jennifer Hudson (feat. R. Kelly)†	Robert Kelly‡	Terry Hunter	2014	JHUD
"Juicy Booty" Chris Brown (feat. Jhené Aiko and R. Kelly)	Christopher Brown; Jamal Jones; Urales Vargas; Jhené Chilombo; Robert Kelly; Roger Troutman; Larry Troutman; James Mtune; Ronald Hudson; Fabian Lenssen; Mikel Hooks; Norman Durham; Matthew Naples; Henry Chu; Mika Means; Woodrow Cunningham	Polow da Don; Chu; DJ Buddha	2017	Heartbreak on a Full Moon
"Keep Doin' That (Rich Bitch)" Rick Ross (feat. R. Kelly)†	William Roberts II; Robert Kelly; Mack Loggins; Les Baxter; Tyrone Griffin Jr	V12 The Hitman	2014	Hood Billionaire
"PYD" Justin Bieber (feat. R. Kelly)†	Justin Bieber; Robert Kelly; Jason Boyd; Jimmy Giannos; Dominic Jordan; Jamal Rashid; Sasha Sirota	The Audibles	2013	Journals
"Satisfy You" Puff Daddy (feat. R. Kelly)†	Sean Combs; Robert Kelly; Kelly Price; Denzil Foster; Jay King; Thomas McElroy; Marvin Gaye; Odell Brown; Jerold Dwight Ellis III; Garrick Husbands	Sean "Puffy" Combs; Jeffery "J-Dub" Walker	1999	Forever
"Wonderful" Ja Rule (feat. R. Kelly & Ashanti)†	Jeffery Atkins; Robert Kelly; Irving Lorenzo; Kendred Smith	Irv Gotti; Jimi Kendrix	2004	R.U.L.E.

== See also ==
- List of unreleased songs recorded by R. Kelly
