= List of songs written and produced by R. Kelly =

This is a list of songs written and produced by R. Kelly.

== Songs ==
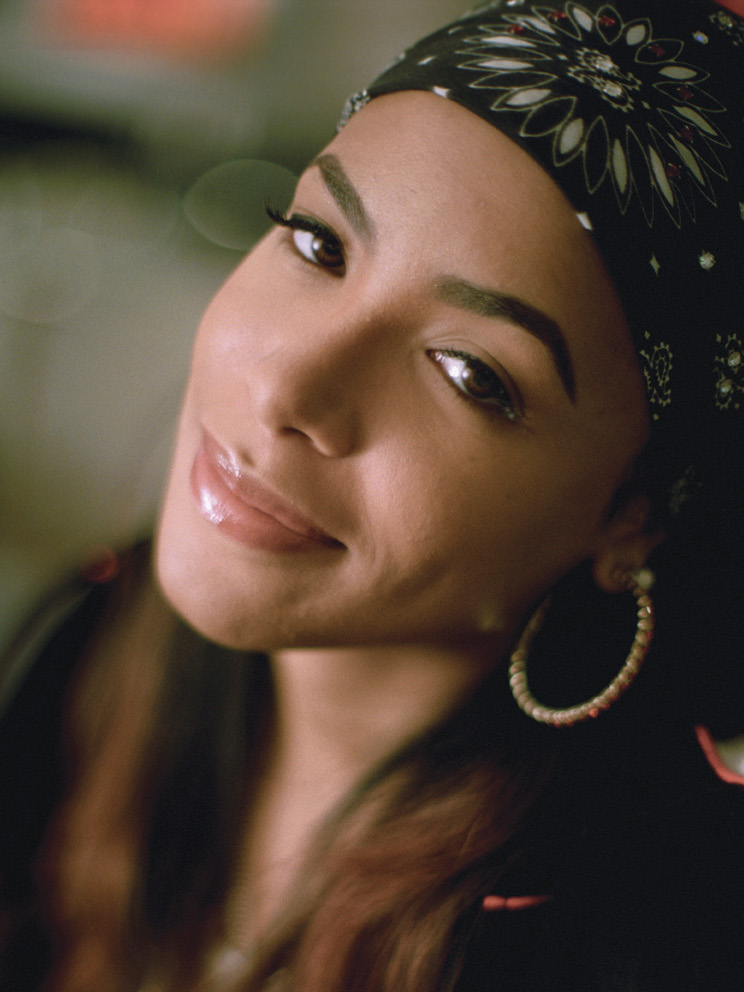
Kelly wrote and produced Aaliyah's debut album Age Ain't Nothing but a Number (1994).

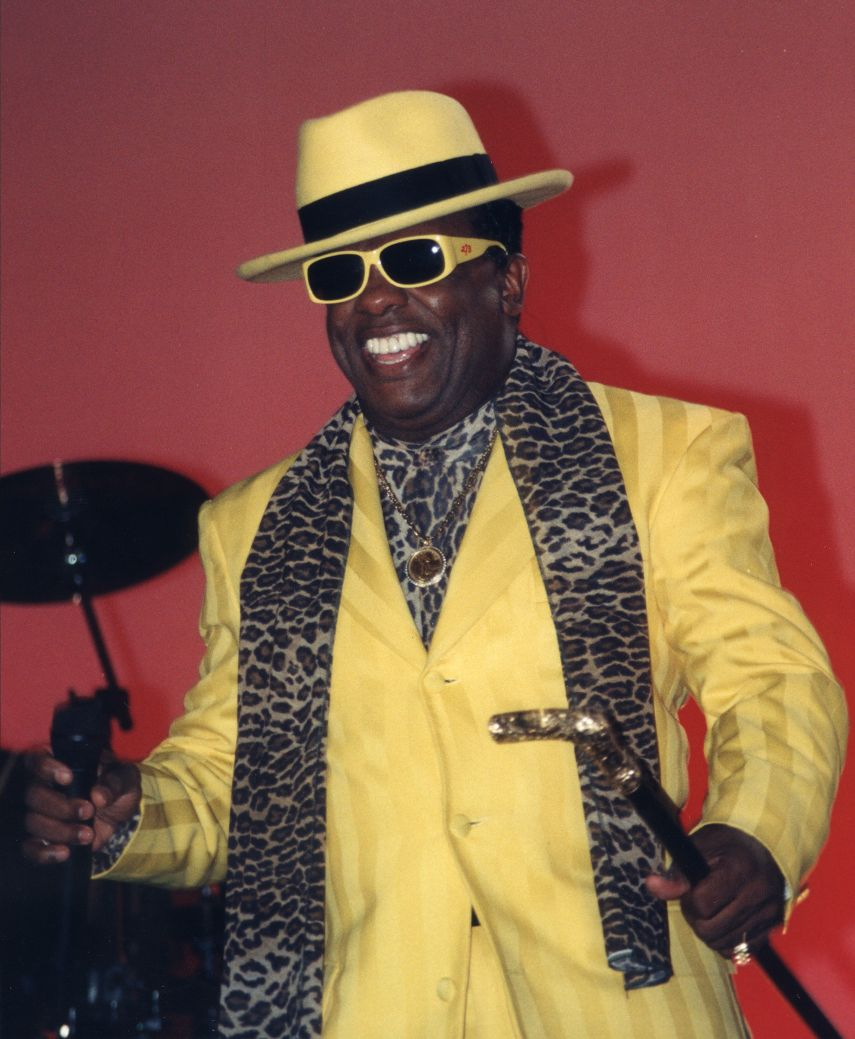
Kelly collaborated with Ronald Isley on "Down Low (Nobody Has to Know)" for his album R. Kelly (1995), "Friend of Mine (Remix)" from Kelly Price's album Soul of a Woman (1998), and "Contagious" from the album Eternal (2001) by the Isley Brothers. Kelly also wrote and produced most of their album Body Kiss (2003).

Key
‡	Indicates song written solely by Kelly
±	Indicates song produced solely by Kelly

Song	Artist	Writer(s)	Producer(s)	Year	Album	Ref.
"12 Nights of Christmas"	R. Kelly	Robert Kelly‡	Robert Kelly±	2016	12 Nights of Christmas	
"12 Play"	R. Kelly	Robert Kelly‡	Robert Kelly; Timmy Allen (co.)	1993	12 Play	
"2nd Kelly"	R. Kelly	Robert Kelly‡	Robert Kelly±	1998	R.	
"3-Way Phone Call" (feat. Kelly Price, Kim Burrell & Maurice Mahon)	R. Kelly	Robert Kelly‡	Robert Kelly±	2004	Happy People/U Saved Me	
"808"	Blaque	Robert Kelly; Natina Reed	Robert Kelly±	1999	Blaque	
"A Little Bit Older Now"	Hi-Five	Robert Kelly‡	Robert Kelly±	1992	Keep It Goin' On	
"A Love Letter Christmas"	R. Kelly	Robert Kelly‡	Robert Kelly±	2010	Love Letter	
"Actress" (feat. R. Kelly)	Ty Dolla $ign	Tyrone Griffin Jr. Robert Kelly; Emile II	D'Mile	2015	Free TC	
"A Woman's Threat"	R. Kelly	Robert Kelly‡	Robert Kelly±	2000	TP-2.COM	
"Africa"	R. Kelly	Robert Kelly‡	Robert Kelly±	2005	My Diary	
"Age Ain't Nothing But a Number"	Aaliyah	Robert Kelly‡	Robert Kelly±	1994	Age Ain't Nothing But a Number	
"All Day, All Night"	Changing Faces	Robert Kelly‡	Robert Kelly±	1997	All Day, All Night	
"All I Really Want"	R. Kelly	Robert Kelly‡	Robert Kelly±	2000	TP-2.COM	
"All Is Not Gone"	Changing Faces	Robert Kelly‡	Robert Kelly±	1994	Changing Faces	
"All My Fault"	R. Kelly	Robert Kelly‡	Robert Kelly±	2015	The Buffet	
"All Of My Days" (feat. Jay-Z)	Changing Faces	Robert Kelly; Shawn Carter	Robert Kelly±	1996	Space Jam (Soundtrack); All Day, All Night	
"All Rounds On Me"	R. Kelly	Robert Kelly; Dorrell Mays	Robert Kelly; Bigg Makk	2012	Write Me Back	
"All The Above" (feat. R. Kelly)	Beanie Sigel	Dwight Grant; Robert Kelly; The Runners	The Runners	2007	The Solution	
"All The Way" (feat. Kelly Rowland)	R. Kelly	Robert Kelly; Sly Jordan	David Anthony; Rich Nice; Robert Kelly	2013	Black Panties	
"Any Time, Any Place (R. Kelly Mix)"	Janet Jackson	Janet Jackson James Harris III Terry Lewis	Robert Kelly±	1994	Janet Remixed	
"Anything Goes" (feat. Ty Dolla $ign)	R. Kelly	Robert Kelly; Dernst Emile; Tyrone Griffen Jr.	Robert Kelly; D'Mile	2015	The Buffet	
"Apologies of a Thug"	R. Kelly	Robert Kelly‡	Robert Kelly±	2002	Loveland (Limited Edition)	
"As I Look Into My Life"	R. Kelly	Robert Kelly‡	Robert Kelly±	1995	R. Kelly	
"At Your Best (You Are Love)"	Aaliyah	Ernie Isley; Marvin Isley; O'Kelly Isley Jr. Ronald Isley; Chris Jasper	Robert Kelly±	1994	Age Ain't Nothing But a Number	
"Baby, Baby, Baby, Baby, Baby..."	R. Kelly	Robert Kelly‡	Robert Kelly±	1995	R. Kelly	
"Back & Forth"	Aaliyah	Robert Kelly‡	Robert Kelly±	1994	Age Ain't Nothing But a Number	
"Back To The Hood of Things"	R. Kelly	Robert Kelly‡	Robert Kelly±	1993	12 Play	
"Backyard Party"	R. Kelly	Robert Kelly‡	Robert Kelly±	2015	The Buffet	
"Bad Man"	R. Kelly	Robert Kelly‡	Robert Kelly±	2000	Shaft (Soundtrack)	
"Bangin' The Headboard"	R. Kelly	Robert Kelly; Darhyl Camper; Infinity; Miguel Jiminez; Sassieon Hill	Darhyl "DJ Camper"; Infinity; Robert Kelly	2009	Untitled	
"Barely Breathin'"	R. Kelly	Robert Kelly‡	Robert Kelly±	2015	The Buffet (Deluxe Version)	
"Be Careful" (feat. R. Kelly)	Sparkle	Robert Kelly‡	Robert Kelly±	1998	Sparkle	
"Be My #2"	R. Kelly	Robert Kelly; Jack Splash; Paul Kyser; Leon Stuckley	Jack Splash; Robert Kelly	2009	Untitled	
"Beautiful In This Mirror"	R. Kelly	Robert Kelly‡	Robert Kelly±	2012	Write Me Back (Deluxe Edition)	
"Been Around The World" (feat. Ja Rule)	R. Kelly	Robert Kelly‡	Robert Kelly±	2003	Chocolate Factory	
"Believe In Me"	R. Kelly	Robert Kelly‡	Robert Kelly; J. LBS	2012	Write Me Back	
"Believe That It's So"	R. Kelly	Robert Kelly‡	Robert Kelly±	2012	Write Me Back	
"Best At It"	R. Kelly	Robert Kelly‡	Robert Kelly±	2013	Black Panties (Japan Edition)	
"Best Friend" (feat. Keyshia Cole and Polow Da Don)	R. Kelly	Robert Kelly‡	Robert Kelly±	2007	Double Up	
"Body Kiss" (feat. Lil' Kim)	The Isley Brothers	Robert Kelly; Kimberly Jones	Robert Kelly±	2003	Body Kiss	
"Born Into the 90's"	R. Kelly & Public Announcement	Robert Kelly‡	Robert Kelly±	1992	Born Into the 90's	
“Born to My Music”	R. Kelly	Robert Kelly‡	Robert Kelly±	2019	TBA	
“Bump, Bump, Bump”	B2K	Robert Kelly; Varick Smith; P. Diddy	Robert Kelly; P. Diddy	2002	Pandemonium! (Special Edition)	
"Bump N' Grind"	R. Kelly	Robert Kelly‡	Robert Kelly±	1993	12 Play	
"Burn It Up" (feat. Wisin and Yandell)	R. Kelly	Robert Kelly; Luny Tunes; Wisin and Yandell	Luny Tunes; Robert Kelly (co.)	2005	TP.3 Reloaded	
"Busted" (feat. JS)	The Isley Brothers	Robert Kelly‡	Robert Kelly±	2003	Body Kiss	
"Bye Bye"	JS	Robert Kelly‡	Robert Kelly	2003	Ice Cream	
"Calling All Girls"	ATL	Robert Kelly‡	Robert Kelly±	2003	The ATL Project	
"Can We Go 'Round Again"	Billy Ocean	Robert Kelly; Billy Ocean	Robert Kelly±	1993	Time to Move On	
"Can You Feel It"	R. Kelly	Robert Kelly‡	Robert Kelly±	2010	Epic	
"The Champ" (feat. Swizz Beatz)	R. Kelly	Robert Kelly‡	Robert Kelly±	2007	Double Up	
"Charlie, Last Name Wilson"	Charlie Wilson	Robert Kelly‡	Robert Kelly±	2005	Charlie, Last Name Wilson	
"The Chase"	R. Kelly	Robert Kelly‡	Robert Kelly±	1998	R.	
"Chocolate Factory"	R. Kelly	Robert Kelly‡	Robert Kelly±	2003	Chocolate Factory	
"Circles"	R. Kelly	Robert Kelly‡	Robert Kelly±	2013	Black Panties (Japan Edition)	
"Clipped Wings"	R. Kelly	Robert Kelly; Warryn Campbell	Robert Kelly; Warryn Campbell	2012	Write Me Back	
"Clubbin'" (feat. Joe Budden & Pied Piper)	Marques Houston	Robert Kelly; Joe Budden	Robert Kelly±	2003	MH	
Contagious (feat. R. Kelly and Chanté Moore)	The Isley Brothers	Robert Kelly‡	Robert Kelly±	2001	Eternal	
"Cookie"	R. Kelly	Robert Kelly; J. Angel; Winfred Crabtree II; Rebecca Johnson; Aaron Revelle; Destin Resa Mungall	Win; T. Newsome; Rahk; Destin; Robert Kelly	2013	Black Panties	
"Crazy Night" (feat. R. City)	R. Kelly	Robert Kelly; Ronnie Jackson; Timothy Thomas; Theron Thomas; Maurice Simmonds	Lil Ronnie; Robert Kelly	2009	Untitled	
"Crazy Sex"	R. Kelly	Robert Kelly; Ron LaTour; Brock Korsan	Cardo; Robert Kelly	2013	Black Panties	
"Cry"	Michael Jackson	Robert Kelly‡	Robert Kelly; Michael Jackson	2001	Invincible	
"Dancing With A Rich Man"	R. Kelly	Robert Kelly‡	Robert Kelly±	1998	R.	
"Dedicated"	R. Kelly & Public Announcement	Robert Kelly‡	Robert Kelly±	1992	Born Into the 90's	
"Definition of a Hotti"	R. Kelly & Public Announcement	Robert Kelly‡	Robert Kelly±	1992	Born Into the 90's	
"The Diary of Me"	R. Kelly	Robert Kelly‡	Robert Kelly±	2004	Happy People/U Saved Me	
"Did You Ever Think" (feat. Nas and Tone)	R. Kelly	Robert Kelly; Curtis Mayfield; J.C. Olivier; S. Barnes	Robert Kelly; Tone and Poke; Corey Rooney (co.)	1998	R.	
"Discovery"	Brian McKnight	Robert Kelly‡	Robert Kelly±	1999	Life [Original Soundtrack]	
"Do What U Want" (feat. R. Kelly)	Lady Gaga	Robert Kelly; Stefani Germanotta; Paul Blair; Martin Bresso; William Grigahcine	Lady Gaga DJ White Snow	2013	Artpop	
"Do What You Gotta Do"	112	Robert Kelly‡	Robert Kelly±	2001	Part III	
"Dollar Bill" (feat. Foxy Brown)	R. Kelly	Robert Kelly; J.C. Olivier; I. Marchand; S. Barnes; S. Otis	Robert Kelly; Tone and Poke; Al West (co.)	1998	R.	
"Don't Put Me Out"	R. Kelly	Robert Kelly‡	Robert Kelly±	1998	R.	
"Don't You Say No"	R. Kelly	Robert Kelly‡	Robert Kelly±	2000	TP-2.COM	
"Double Up" (feat. Snoop Dogg)	R. Kelly	Robert Kelly; Calvin Broadus; Charlene Keys; Nisan Stewart; Craig Brockman; Charles Bereal	Robert Kelly; Khao (co.)	2007	Double Up	
"Down Low (Nobody Has to Know)" (feat. The Isley Brothers)	R. Kelly	Robert Kelly‡	Robert Kelly±	1995	R. Kelly	
"Down Low Double Life"	R. Kelly	Robert Kelly‡	Robert Kelly±	1998	R.	
"Down with the Clique"	Aaliyah	Robert Kelly‡	Robert Kelly±	1994	Age Ain't Nothing But a Number	
"Dream Girl"	R. Kelly	Robert Kelly‡	Robert Kelly±	2003	Chocolate Factory	
"Echo"	R. Kelly	Robert Kelly; Infinity; Darhyl Camper; Claude Kelly	Infinity; Darhyl "DJ Camper"; Robert Kelly	2009	Untitled	
"Elsewhere"	R. Kelly	Robert Kelly; Chris Henderson	Christopher 'Deep' Henderson; Robert Kelly	2009	Untitled	
"Etcetera"	R. Kelly	Robert Kelly‡	Robert Kelly±	1998	R.	
"Every Position"	R. Kelly	Robert Kelly; Nayvadius Wilburn; Dennis-Manuel Peters; Daniel Coriglie; Mario Bakovic	T-Town Productions; Robert Kelly	2013	Black Panties (Deluxe Edition)	
"Everything's So Different Without You"	Billy Ocean	Robert Kelly; Billy Ocean	Robert Kelly±	1993	Time to Move On	
"Exit"	R. Kelly	Robert Kelly; Phalon Alexander; Larry Nix; Kassim Vonricco Washington	Jazze Pha; Robert Kelly	2009	Untitled	
"Fallin' from the Sky"	R. Kelly	Robert Kelly; Dennis-Manuel Peters; Mario Bakovic; Daniel Corigile; Shaun Harris	T-Town Productions; Robert Kelly	2009	Untitled (UK Edition); Write Me Back (Deluxe Edition)	
"Fallin' Hearts"	R. Kelly	Robert Kelly‡	Robert Kelly±	2010	Love Letter (Best Buy Exclusive) / (Japan Version)	
"Far More"	R. Kelly	Robert Kelly‡	Robert Kelly±	2002	Loveland (Limited Edition)	
"Feelin' on Yo Booty"	R. Kelly	Robert Kelly‡	Robert Kelly±	2000	TP-2.COM	
"Feelin' Single"	R. Kelly	Robert Kelly‡	Robert Kelly; Bigg Makk	2012	Write Me Back	
"Fiesta" (feat. Boo & Gotti)	R. Kelly	Robert Kelly‡	Tone and Poke; Precision	2000	TP-2.COM	
"Fireworks"	R. Kelly	Robert Kelly‡	Robert Kelly±	2010	Epic	
"Follow The Wind"	Trisha Yearwood	Robert Kelly‡	Robert Kelly±	1999	Life [Original Soundtrack]	
"Fool For You"	R. Kelly	Robert Kelly‡	Robert Kelly±	2012	Write Me Back	
"Foolin' Around"	Changing Faces	Robert Kelly‡	Robert Kelly±	1994	Changing Faces	
"For You"	R. Kelly	Robert Kelly‡	Robert Kelly±	1993	12 Play	
"Forever"	R. Kelly	Robert Kelly‡	Robert Kelly±	2003	Chocolate Factory	
"Forever More"	R. Kelly	Robert Kelly‡	Robert Kelly±	2003	Chocolate Factory	
"Fortunate"	Maxwell	Robert Kelly‡	Robert Kelly±	1999	Life [Original Soundtrack]	
"Freak Dat Body"	R. Kelly	Robert Kelly‡	Robert Kelly±	1993	12 Play	
"Freak Tonight"	R. Kelly	Robert Kelly‡	Robert Kelly±	1996	A Thin Line Between Love and Hate [Original Soundtrack]	
"Freaky In The Club"	R. Kelly	Robert Kelly‡	Robert Kelly±	2007	Double Up	
"Friend of Mine (Remix)" (feat. R. Kelly & Ronald Isley)	Kelly Price	Robert Kelly; Anthony Dent; Steven Jordan; Kelly Price; Jeffrey Walker	Robert Kelly±	1998	Soul of a Woman	
"Fuck You Tonight" (feat. R. Kelly)	The Notorious B.I.G.	Robert Kelly; Christopher Wallace; Daron Jones; Sean Combs	Daron Jones; Sean Combs	1997	Life After Death	
"Genius"	R. Kelly	Robert Kelly; Dorrell Mays	Bigg Makk; Robert Kelly	2013	Black Panties	
"Get Dirty" (feat. Chamillionaire)	R. Kelly	Robert Kelly; H. Seriki	Robert Kelly; Mysto & Pizzi (co.)	2007	Double Up	
"Get Out of Here With Me"	R. Kelly	Robert Kelly; Donnie Lyle	Robert Kelly; Donnie Lyle	2015	The Buffet	
"Get Up On A Room"	R. Kelly	Robert Kelly‡	Robert Kelly±	1998	R.	
G.H.E.T.T.O.U.T	Changing Faces	Robert Kelly‡	Robert Kelly±	1997	All Day, All Night	
"Ghetto Queen" (feat. Crucial Conflict)	R. Kelly	Robert Kelly; W. Martin; M. King; C. Johnson; R. Leverston	Robert Kelly±	1998	R.	
"Ghetto Religion" (feat. Wyclef Jean)	R. Kelly	Robert Kelly; Wyclef Jean; Jerry "Wonder" Duplessis	Robert Kelly; Wyclef Jean; Jerry "Wonder" Duplessis	2003	The R. in R&B Collection, Vol. 1	
"Gigolo" (feat. R. Kelly)	Nick Cannon	Robert Kelly; Nick Cannon	Robert Kelly±	2003	Nick Cannon	
"Girlfriend"	B2K	Robert Kelly‡	Robert Kelly±	2003	Pandemonium! (Special Edition)	
"Girls Go Crazy" (feat. Baby)	R. Kelly	Robert Kelly; B. Williams	Robert Kelly±	2005	TP.3 Reloaded	
"Go Low"	R. Kelly	Robert Kelly‡	Robert Kelly±	2009	Untitled	
"God's Grace"	Trin-i-tee 5:7	Robert Kelly‡	Robert Kelly±	1998	Trin-i-tee 5:7	
"Good Life"	Sparkle	Robert Kelly‡	Robert Kelly±	1998	Sparkle	
"Gotham City"	R. Kelly	Robert Kelly‡	Robert Kelly±	1997	Batman & Robin (Original Soundtrack); R. (International Edition)	
"The Greatest Sex"	R. Kelly	Robert Kelly‡	Robert Kelly±	2000	TP-2.COM	
"The Greatest Show On Earth"	R. Kelly	Robert Kelly‡	Robert Kelly±	2004	Happy People/U Saved Me	
"Green Light"	R. Kelly	Robert Kelly‡	Robert Kelly±	2012	Write Me Back	
"Guess What"	Syleena Johnson	Robert Kelly‡	Robert Kelly±	2002	Chapter 2: The Voice	
"Half"	JS	Robert Kelly‡	Robert Kelly	2003	Ice Cream	
"Half on a Baby"	R. Kelly	Robert Kelly‡	Robert Kelly±	1998	R.	
"Hangin' Out"	R. Kelly & Public Announcement	Robert Kelly‡	Robert Kelly±	1992	Born Into the 90's	
"Happy People"	R. Kelly	Robert Kelly‡	Robert Kelly±	2004	Happy People/U Saved Me	
"Happy Summertime" (feat. Snoop Dogg)	R. Kelly	Robert Kelly; Calvin Broadus	Robert Kelly±	2005	TP.3 Reloaded	
"Havin' A Baby"	R. Kelly	Robert Kelly‡	Robert Kelly±	2007	Double Up	
"Heal It (Prelude)"	R. Kelly	Robert Kelly‡	Robert Kelly±	2010	Epic	
"Heart Of A Woman"	R. Kelly	Robert Kelly‡	Robert Kelly±	2003	Chocolate Factory	
"Heaven I Need a Hug"	R. Kelly	Robert Kelly‡	Robert Kelly±	2002	Loveland (Limited Edition)	
"Heaven If You Hear Me"	R. Kelly	Robert Kelly‡	Robert Kelly±	1995	R. Kelly	
"Hell Yeah"	Ginuwine	Robert Kelly; Bryan Williams	Robert Kelly±	2003	The Senior	
"Hey Love (Can I Have a Word)"	R. Kelly & Public Announcement	Robert Kelly; Morris Broadnax; Lee Haggard; Clarence Paul; Wayne Williams; Stevie Wonder	Robert Kelly; Mr. lee Wayne Williams	1992	Born Into the 90's	
"Hit It Til The Mornin'" (feat. Twista and Do Or Die)	R. Kelly	Robert Kelly; Mitchell Carl Terrell; Dennis Round; Darnel Smith	Robert Kelly±	2005	TP.3 Reloaded	
"Hold On"	R. Kelly	Robert Kelly‡	Robert Kelly±	2001	Ali (Original Soundtrack)	
"Home Alone" (feat. Keith Murray)	R. Kelly	Robert Kelly; Kelly Price; Keith Murray	G-One	1998	R.	
"Homie Lover Friend"	R. Kelly	Robert Kelly‡	Robert Kelly; Timmy Allen (co.)	1993	12 Play	
"Honey Love"	R. Kelly & Public Announcement	Robert Kelly‡	Robert Kelly±	1992	Born Into the 90's	
"Hook It Up" (feat. Huey)	R. Kelly	Robert Kelly‡	Robert Kelly±	2007	Double Up	
"Hotel" (feat. R. Kelly)	Cassidy	Robert Kelly; Barry Reese; Bernard Edwards; Kaseem Dean; Nile Rodgers	Swizz Beats	2003	Split Personality	
"How Did You Manage"	R. Kelly	Robert Kelly‡	Robert Kelly±	2004	Happy People/U Saved Me	
"How Do I Tell Her"	R. Kelly	Robert Kelly‡	Robert Kelly±	2010	Love Letter	
"How Many Ways (R. Kelly Remix W/Rap)"	Toni Braxton	Vincent Herbert; Toni Braxton; Noel Gorging; Keith Miller; Philip Field	Robert Kelly; Vincent Herbert	1994	Toni Braxton	
"Hump Bounce"	R. Kelly	Robert Kelly‡	Robert Kelly±	1995	R. Kelly	
"Hush"	Jaheim	Robert Kelly‡	Robert Kelly±	2007	The Makings of a Man	
"Hypnotic" (feat. R. Kelly & Fabolous)	Syleena Johnson	Robert Kelly; John Jackson	Robert Kelly±	2005	Chapter 3: The Flesh	
"I Admit"	R. Kelly	Robert Kelly; Raphael Ramos Oliveira	R. Kelly; Noc	2018	non-album release	
"I Am Your Woman"	Syleena Johnson	Robert Kelly‡	Robert Kelly±	2001	Chapter 1: Love, Pain & Forgiveness	
"I Believe"	R. Kelly	Robert Kelly‡	Robert Kelly±	2008	Epic	
"I Believe I Can Fly"	R. Kelly	Robert Kelly‡	Robert Kelly±	1996	Space Jam (Soundtrack); R.	
"I Can't Sleep Baby (If I)"	R. Kelly	Robert Kelly‡	Robert Kelly±	1995	R. Kelly	
"I Decided"	R. Kelly	Robert Kelly‡	Robert Kelly±	2000	TP-2.COM	
"I Don't Mean It"	R. Kelly	Robert Kelly‡	Robert Kelly±	2000	TP-2.COM	
"I Don't Want To"	Toni Braxton	Robert Kelly‡	Robert Kelly±	1996	Secrets	
"I Just Can't Do This"	K. Michelle	Robert Kelly‡	Robert Kelly±	2010	Non-album single	
"I Just Want to Thank You" (feat. Wizkid)"	R. Kelly	Robert Kelly; Brandon Green; Ayodeji Ibrahim Balogun	Robert Kelly; Maejor	2015	The Buffet (Deluxe Version)	
"I Know What You Need"	R. Kelly & Public Announcement	Robert Kelly‡	Robert Kelly±	1992	Born Into the 90's	
"I Know You Are Hurting (Tribute to the Newton, Ct. Kids)"	R. Kelly	Robert Kelly‡	Robert Kelly±	2013	I Know You Are Hurting (Tribute to the Newton, Ct. Kids)	
"I Like Love"	R. Kelly	Robert Kelly‡	Robert Kelly±	2007	Double Up (Japan/Canada Edition)	
"I Like The Crotch On You"	R. Kelly	Robert Kelly‡	Robert Kelly±	1993	12 Play	
"I Look to You"	Whitney Houston	Robert Kelly‡	Emanuel Kiriakou Harvey Mason Jr. Tricky Stewart	2009	I Look to You	
"I Love The DJ"	R. Kelly	Robert Kelly; Carsten Shack; Kenneth Karlin; Rob Allen	Soulshock; Karlin; Robert Kelly	2009	Untitled	
"I Mean (I Don't Mean It)"	R. Kelly	Robert Kelly‡	Robert Kelly±	2000	TP-2.COM	
"I Need an Angel"	Daniel DeBourg	Robert Kelly‡	Robert Kelly±	2002	Tell the World	
"I Need an Angel"	Ruben Studdard	Robert Kelly	Robery Kelly	2004	I Need an Angel	
"I Surrender"	R. Kelly	Robert Kelly‡	Robert Kelly±	2004	Happy People/U Saved Me	
"I Tried"	R. Kelly	Robert Kelly; Dorrell Mays	Robert Kelly; Big Makk	2015	The Buffet (Deluxe Version)	
"I Wish"	R. Kelly	Robert Kelly‡	Robert Kelly±	2000	TP-2.COM	
"If"	R. Kelly	Robert Kelly‡	Robert Kelly±	2004	Happy People/U Saved Me	
"Ice Cream"	JS	Robert Kelly‡	Robert Kelly	2003	Ice Cream	
"If I Could Make the World Dance"	R. Kelly	Robert Kelly‡	Robert Kelly±	2004	Happy People/U Saved Me	
"If I Could Turn Back the Hands of Time"	R. Kelly	Robert Kelly‡	Robert Kelly±	1998	R.	
"If I'm Wit You"	R. Kelly	Robert Kelly; Curtis Mayfield; J.C. Oliver; N. Robinson; K. Robinson; S. Barnes	Robert Kelly; Tone and Poke (co.)	1998	R.	
"Ignition"	R. Kelly	Robert Kelly‡	Robert Kelly±	2003	Chocolate Factory	
"Ignition (Remix)"	R. Kelly	Robert Kelly‡	Robert Kelly±	2003	Chocolate Factory	
"I'll Never Leave"	R. Kelly	Robert Kelly‡	Robert Kelly±	2003	Chocolate Factory	
"I'm a Flirt (Remix)"	R. Kelly	Robert Kelly; Shad Moss; Ronnie Jackson; Clifford Harris; Faheem Najm	Robert Kelly±	2007	Double Up	
"I'm Down"	Aaliyah	Robert Kelly‡	Robert Kelly±	1994	Age Ain't Nothing But a Number	
"I'm Gone"	Sparkle	Robert Kelly‡	Robert Kelly±	1998	Sparkle	
"I'm So Into You"	Aaliyah	Robert Kelly‡	Robert Kelly±	1994	Age Ain't Nothing But a Number	
"I'm Your Angel"	R. Kelly and Celine Dion	Robert Kelly‡	Robert Kelly±	1998	R.	
"Imagine That"	R. Kelly	Robert Kelly‡	Robert Kelly±	2003	Chocolate Factory	
"In the Kitchen"	R. Kelly	Robert Kelly‡	Robert Kelly±	2005	TP.3 Reloaded	
"The Interview" (feat. Suzanne LeMignot)	R. Kelly	Robert Kelly‡	Robert Kelly±	1998	R.	
"Intro - the Sermon"	R. Kelly	Robert Kelly‡	Robert Kelly±	1995	R. Kelly	
"It Seems Like You're Ready"	R. Kelly	Robert Kelly‡	Robert Kelly±	1993	12 Play	
"It's Gonna Rain"	Kelly Price	Robert Kelly‡	Robert Kelly±	1999	Life [Original Soundtrack]	
"It's Like Everyday" (feat. R. Kelly)	DJ Quick	Robert Kelly‡	Robert Kelly±	1999	Life [Original Soundtrack]	
"It's On" (feat. R. Kelly)	Mary J. Blige	Robert Kelly‡	Robert Kelly±	1997	Share My World	
"It's Your Birthday"	R. Kelly	Robert Kelly‡	Robert Kelly±	2004	Happy People/U Saved Me	
"Joined at the Hip"	Syleena Johnson	Robert Kelly‡	Robert Kelly±	2002	Chapter 2: The Voice	
"Just Can't Get Enough"	R. Kelly	Robert Kelly‡	Robert Kelly±	2010	Love Letter	
"Just Like That"	R. Kelly	Robert Kelly‡	Robert Kelly±	2010	Love Letter	
"Just Like That"	R. Kelly	Robert Kelly‡	Robert Kelly±	2000	TP-2.COM	
"Keep It Street'"	R. Kelly & Public Announcement	Robert Kelly‡	Robert Kelly±	1992	Born Into the 90's	
"Keep Searchin'"	R. Kelly	Robert Kelly‡	Robert Kelly±	2015	The Buffet (Deluxe Version)	
"Kickin' It With Your Girlfriend"	R. Kelly	Robert Kelly‡	Robert Kelly±	2005	TP.3 Reloaded	
"Ladies' Night (Treat Her Like Heaven)"	R. Kelly	Robert Kelly‡	Robert Kelly±	2004	Happy People/U Saved Me	
"Lady Sunday"	R. Kelly	Robert Kelly‡	Robert Kelly±	2012	Write Me Back	
"Laundromat"	Nivea	Robert Kelly‡	Robert Kelly±	2001	Nivea	
"Lean on Me"	Sparkle	Robert Kelly‡	Robert Kelly±	1998	Sparkle	
"Leap Of Faith"	R. Kelly	Robert Kelly‡	Robert Kelly±	2004	Happy People/U Saved Me	
"Legs Shakin'" (feat. Ludacris)	R. Kelly	Robert Kelly; Christopher Bridges; Lamar "Marz" Edwards	Marz; Robert Kelly	2013	Black Panties	
"Let Em' Know"	Bryson Tiller	Bryson Tiller; Robert Kelly; Joshua Scruggs	Syk Sense	2015	T R A P S O U L	
"Let Your Light Shine"	R. Kelly	Robert Kelly‡	Robert Kelly±	2005	Let Your Light Shine; Hurricane Relief: Come Together Now	
"Let's Be Real Now" (feat. Tinashe)	R. Kelly	Robert Kelly; Magnus August Høiberg; Joshua Coleman; Tinashe Kachingwe	Robert Kelly; Cashmere Cat; Ammo	2015	The Buffet	
"Let's Make Some Noise" (feat. Jhené Aiko)	R. Kelly	Robert Kelly; Keyel Walker; Jhené Aiko; Anton Alexander; Johntá Austin; Bryan-Michael Cox; Kevin Hicks	Robert Kelly; Keyel Walker	2015	The Buffet	
"Life"	K-Ci & JoJo	Robert Kelly‡	Robert Kelly±	1999	Life [Original Soundtrack]	
"Like A Real Freak"	R. Kelly	Robert Kelly‡	Robert Kelly±	2000	TP-2.COM	
"Like I Do"	R. Kelly	Robert Kelly; Carlos McKinney; Claude Kelly	LOS Da Mystro; Robert Kelly	2009	Untitled	
"Listen"	Marvin Sapp	Robert Kelly‡	Robert Kelly±	2017	Close	
"Let's Get It Started (Keep It Goin' On)"	Hi-Five	Robert Kelly‡	Robert Kelly±	1992	Keep It Goin' On	
"Looking for Love"	R. Kelly	Robert Kelly‡	Robert Kelly±	1998	R.	
"Lost In Your Love"	R. Kelly	Robert Kelly‡	Robert Kelly±	2010	Love Letter	
"Love Angel"	JS	Robert Kelly‡	Robert Kelly	2003	Ice Cream	
"Love Is"	R. Kelly	Robert Kelly‡	Robert Kelly±	2012	Write Me Back	
"Love Is" (feat. K. Michelle)	R. Kelly	Robert Kelly‡	Robert Kelly±	2010	Love Letter	
"Love Is On The Way"	R. Kelly	Robert Kelly‡	Robert Kelly±	1995	R. Kelly	
"Love Letter"	R. Kelly	Robert Kelly‡	Robert Kelly±	2010	Love Letter	
"Love Letter (Prelude)"	R. Kelly	Robert Kelly‡	Robert Kelly±	2010	Love Letter	
"Love Signals"	R. Kelly	Robert Kelly‡	Robert Kelly±	2004	Happy People/U Saved Me	
"Love Street"	R. Kelly	Robert Kelly‡	Robert Kelly±	2004	Happy People/U Saved Me	
"Loveland"	R. Kelly	Robert Kelly‡	Robert Kelly±	2002	Loveland (Limited Edition)	
"Lovin' You"	Sparkle	Minnie Riperton; Richard Rudolph	Robert Kelly±	1998	Sparkle	
"Lucky Charm"	The Isely Brothers	Robert Kelly‡	Robert Kelly±	2003	Body Kiss	
"Magic"	Charlie Wilson	Robert Kelly‡	Robert Kelly±	2005	Charlie, Last Name Wilson	
"Make You My Baby"	Joe	Robert Kelly‡	Robert Kelly±	2003	And Then...	
"Marching Band" (feat. Juicy J)	R. Kelly	Robert Kelly; Jordan Houston; Lukasz Gottwald; Jeremy Coleman; Gamal "Lunchmoney" Lewis; Ryan Ogren; Samuel Alexander; Castillo Vasquez	Dr. Luke; Cirkut and A.C; JMIKE; Robert Kelly	2015	The Buffet	
"Marry the Pussy"	R. Kelly	Robert Kelly; Antonio Brown	Beat Mechanix; Robert Kelly	2013	Black Panties	
"Money Makes The World Go Round" (feat. Nas)	R. Kelly	Robert Kelly; A. Barnes; J. Malone; N. Jones	Robert Kelly; Tone and Poke (co.)	1998	R.	
"More & More"	Joe	Robert Kelly‡	Robert Kelly±	2003	And Then...	
"Music Must Be a Lady"	R. Kelly	Robert Kelly‡	Robert Kelly±	2010	Love Letter	
"My Story" (feat. 2 Chainz)	R. Kelly	Robert Kelly; Paul Jefferies; Tauheed Epps	Nineteen85; Robert Kelly	2013	Black Panties	
"My Wish for Christmas"	R. Kelly	Robert Kelly‡	Robert Kelly±	2016	12 Nights of Christmas	
"Naked"	R. Kelly	Robert Kelly‡	Robert Kelly±	2002	The Best of Both Worlds	
"No Greater"	Sparkle	Robert Kelly‡	Robert Kelly±	1998	Sparkle	
"No One Knows How to Love Me Quite Like You Do"	Aaliyah	Robert Kelly‡	Robert Kelly±	1994	Age Ain't Nothing But a Number	
"No Words"	Charlie Wilson	Robert Kelly‡	Robert Kelly±	2005	Charlie, Last Name Wilson	
"Not Feelin' The Love"	R. Kelly	Robert Kelly‡	Robert Kelly±	2010	Love Letter	
"Not Gonna Hold On"	R. Kelly	Robert Kelly‡	Robert Kelly±	1995	R. Kelly	
"Nothing Can Compare"	Sparkle	Robert Kelly‡	Robert Kelly±	1998	Sparkle	
"Number One" (feat. Keri Hilson)	R. Kelly	Robert Kelly; Raphael Hamilton; Roy Hamilton; Keri Hilson	Robert Kelly; Roy Hamilton; Raphael Hamilton	2009	Untitled	
"Number One Hit"	R. Kelly	Robert Kelly‡	Robert Kelly±	2010	Love Letter	
"Old School"	Aaliyah	Robert Kelly‡	Robert Kelly±	1994	Age Ain't Nothing But a Number	
"One Man"	R. Kelly	Robert Kelly‡	Robert Kelly±	1998	R.	
"One Me"	R. Kelly	Robert Kelly‡	Robert Kelly±	2000	TP-2.COM	
"One More Chance"	Michael Jackson	Robert Kelly‡	Robert Kelly; Michael Jackson	2004	Number Ones	
"One Step Closer"	R. Kelly	Robert Kelly‡	Robert Kelly±	2012	Write Me Back (Deluxe Edition)	
"Only The Loot Can Make Me Happy"	R. Kelly	Robert Kelly; J. Oliver; S. Barnes; D. Townsend; D. Conley; B. Jackson	Robert Kelly; Tone and Poke (co.)	1998	R.	
"The Opera"	R. Kelly	Robert Kelly‡	Robert Kelly±	1998	R.	
"Outrageous"	Britney Spears	Robert Kelly‡	Robert Kelly±	2003	In the Zone	
"Party Jumpin'"	R. Kelly	Robert Kelly‡	Robert Kelly±	2012	Write Me Back	
"Peace"	R. Kelly	Robert Kelly‡	Robert Kelly±	2004	Happy People/U Saved Me	
"Physical"	R. Kelly	Robert Kelly; Tony Scales; John McGee	Chef Tone; John "SK" McGee; Robert Kelly	2013	Black Panties (Deluxe Edition)	
"Play On"	Sparkle	Robert Kelly‡	Robert Kelly±	1998	Sparkle	
"Playa's Only" (feat. The Game)	R. Kelly	Scott Storch; Robert Kelly; Jayceon Taylor	Scott Storch; Robert Kelly	2005	TP.3 Reloaded	
"Plenty of Good Lovin'"	Sparkle	Robert Kelly‡	Robert Kelly±	1998	Sparkle	
"The Poem"	R. Kelly	Robert Kelly‡	Robert Kelly±	2015	The Buffet	
"Poetic Sex"	R. Kelly	Robert Kelly; Samuel Hindes; Mikano F. Fayette; Firman Guion	Robert Kelly; Samuel Hindes	2015	The Buffet	
"Prayer Changes"	R. Kelly	Robert Kelly‡	Robert Kelly±	2004	Happy People/U Saved Me	
"Pregnant" (feat. Tyrese, Robin Thicke and The-Dream)	R. Kelly	Robert Kelly; Berris Bolton; Leon DeWayne Swan; Terius Nash	Berris Bolton; DeWayne Swan; Robert Kelly	2009	Untitled	
"Put My T-Shirt On"	R. Kelly	Robert Kelly‡	Robert Kelly±	2005	TP.3 Reloaded	
"PYD" (feat. R. Kelly)	Justin Bieber	Robert Kelly; Justin Bieber; Sasha Sirota; Dominic Jordan; Jimmy Giannos; Jason Boyd; Jamal Rashid	Sasha Sirota; The Audibles	2013	Journals	
"Questions"	Tamia	Robert Kelly‡	Robert Kelly±	2004	More	
"Quiet Place"	Sparkle	Robert Kelly‡	Robert Kelly±	1998	Sparkle	
"R&B Thug"	R. Kelly	Robert Kelly‡	Robert Kelly±	2000	TP-2.COM	
"Radio Message"	R. Kelly	Robert Kelly‡	Robert Kelly±	2010	Love Letter	
"Raindrops"	R. Kelly	Robert Kelly‡	Robert Kelly±	2002	Loveland (Limited Edition)	
"The Real R. Kelly"	R. Kelly	Robert Kelly‡	Robert Kelly±	2000	TP-2.COM	
"Real Talk"	R. Kelly	Robert Kelly‡	Robert Kelly±	2007	Double Up	
"Reality"	R. Kelly	Robert Kelly‡	Robert Kelly±	1998	R.	
"Red Carpet (Pause, Flash)"	R. Kelly	Robert Kelly‡	Robert Kelly±	2004	Happy People/U Saved Me	
"Reggae Bump Bump" (feat. Elephant Man)	R. Kelly	Robert Kelly; O'Neil Bryan	Robert Kelly±	2005	TP.3 Reloaded	
"Relief"	R. Kelly	Robert Kelly‡	Robert Kelly±	2008	Love Letter (Japan Version)	
"Religious"	R. Kelly	Robert Kelly; Eric Dawkins; Antonio Dixon; Warryn Campbell; Tyrese Gibson	Eric Dawkins; Antonio Dixon; Robert Kelly	2009	Untitled	
"Religious Love"	R. Kelly	Robert Kelly‡	Robert Kelly±	1995	R. Kelly	
"Remote Control"	R. Kelly	Robert Kelly‡	Robert Kelly±	2005	TP.3 Reloaded	
"Right Back"	R. Kelly	Robert Kelly‡	Darrick "Devyne" Stephens; Christopher Clark; Robert Kelly	2013	Black Panties	
"Ringtone"	R. Kelly	Robert Kelly; Jamal Jones; William Hodge II; Terius Nash	Robert Kelly; Polow da Don	2007	Double Up (International Edition)	
"Rise Up"	R. Kelly	Robert Kelly‡	Robert Kelly±	2007	Double Up	
"Rock Star" (feat. Ludacris and Kid Rock)	R. Kelly	Robert Kelly; Christopher Bridges	Robert Kelly±	2007	Double Up	
"Rollin'"	R. Kelly	Robert Kelly‡	Robert Kelly±	2007	Double Up	
"Rose"	Billy Ocean	Robert Kelly; Billy Ocean	Dorsey "Rob" Robinson	1993	Time to Move On	
"Sadie"	R. Kelly	Joseph B. Jefferson; Bruce Hawes; Charles Simmons	Robert Kelly±	1993	12 Play	
"Same Girl"	R. Kelly and Usher	Robert Kelly; Ronnie Jackson; J. Smith	Lil' Ronnie; Robert Kelly	2007	Double Up	
"Satisfy You" (feat. R. Kelly)	Puff Daddy	Robert Kelly; Sean Combs; Jeffrey Walker; Kelly Price; Denzil Foster; Roger Greene; Jay King; Thomas McElroy	Sean "Puffy" Combs; Jeffrey "J-Dub" Walker	1999	Forever	
"(Sex) Love Is What We Makin'"	R. Kelly	Robert Kelly‡	Robert Kelly±	2005	TP.3 Reloaded	
"Sex Me, Pt. 1 & 2"	R. Kelly	Robert Kelly‡	Robert Kelly±	1993	12 Play	
"Sex Planet"	R. Kelly	Robert Kelly‡	Robert Kelly±	2007	Double Up	
"Sex Weed"	R. Kelly	Robert Kelly‡	Robert Kelly±	2005	TP.3 Reloaded	
"Sextime"	R. Kelly	Robert Kelly; Dorrell Mays; Andre Manuel	Robert Kelly; Bigg Makk; Andre Manuel	2015	The Buffet	
"Share My Love"	R. Kelly	Robert Kelly‡	Robert Kelly±	2012	Write Me Back	
"She's Got That Vibe"	R. Kelly & Public Announcement	Robert Kelly‡	Robert Kelly±	1991	Born Into the 90's	
"She's Loving Me"	R. Kelly & Public Announcement	Robert Kelly‡	Robert Kelly±	1992	Born Into the 90's	
"Show Ya Pussy" (feat. Migos & Juicy J)	R. Kelly	Robert Kelly; Donnie Lyle; Quavious Marshall; Kirksnick Ball; Jordan Houston	Donnie Lyle; Robert Kelly	2013	Black Panties	
"Showdown" (feat. Ronald Isley)	R. Kelly	Robert Kelly‡	Robert Kelly±	2003	Chocolate Factory	
"Shut Up"	R. Kelly	Robert Kelly; Dorrell Mays	Bigg Makk; Robert Kelly	2013	Black Panties	
"Sign of a Victory" (feat. Soweto Spiritual Singers)	R. Kelly	Robert Kelly‡	Robert Kelly±	2010	Listen Up! The Official 2010 FIFA World Cup; Epic	
"Sister"	JS	Robert Kelly‡	Robert Kelly	2003	Ice Cream	
"Sleeping with the One I Love"	Fantasia	Robert Kelly‡	Robert Kelly±	2016	The Definition Of...	
"Slow Dance (Hey Mr. DJ)"	R. Kelly & Public Announcement	Robert Kelly‡	Robert Kelly±	1992	Born Into the 90's	
"Slow Grind"	JS	Robert Kelly‡	Robert Kelly	2003	Ice Cream	
"Slow Wind"	R. Kelly	Robert Kelly‡	Robert Kelly±	2005	TP.3 Reloaded	
"Snake"	R. Kelly	Robert Kelly‡	Robert Kelly±	2003	Chocolate Factory	
"So Sexy" (feat. R. Kelly)	Twista	Robert Kelly‡	Robert Kelly±	2004	Kamikaze	
"Soldier's Heart"	R. Kelly	Robert Kelly‡	Robert Kelly±	2003	Soldier's Heart (Single)	
"Speechless"	The Isley Brothers / Ronald Isley	Robert Kelly‡	Robert Kelly±	1999	Life [Original Soundtrack]	
"Spend That" (feat. Jeezy)	R. Kelly	Robert Kelly; Dijon McFarlane; Mikely Adam; Jay Jenkins	Dijon "DJ Mustard" McFarlane; Mikely Adam; Robert Kelly	2013	Black Panties	
"Spend the Night"	N-Phase	Robert Kelly‡	Robert Kelly±	1994	N-Phase	
"Spendin' Money"	R. Kelly	Robert Kelly; R. Lawrence; S. Combs; S. Jordan; K. Price; D. Romani	Sean "Puffy" Combs; Ron "Amen-Ra" Lawrence; Stevie J. (co.)	1998	R.	
"Spirit"	R. Kelly	Robert Kelly‡	Robert Kelly±	2004	Happy People/U Saved Me	
"Stay Right Here"	JS	Robert Kelly‡	Robert Kelly	2003	Ice Cream	
"Step In My Room"	R. Kelly	Robert Kelly‡	Robert Kelly±	1995	R. Kelly	
"Step In The Name of Love"	R. Kelly	Robert Kelly‡	Robert Kelly±	2003	Chocolate Factory	
"Steppin' Into Heaven"	R. Kelly	Robert Kelly‡	Robert Kelly±	2004	Happy People/U Saved Me	
"Stimulate Me" (feat. Mocha)	Destiny's Child	Robert Kelly‡	Robert Kelly±	1999	Life [Original Soundtrack]	
"Straight Up"	Sparkle	Robert Kelly‡	Robert Kelly±	1998	Sparkle	
"Street Thing"	Aaliyah	Robert Kelly‡	Robert Kelly±	1994	Age Ain't Nothing But a Number	
"The Storm Is Over Now"	R. Kelly	Robert Kelly‡	Robert Kelly±	2000	TP-2.COM	
"Strip For You"	R. Kelly	Robert Kelly‡	Robert Kelly±	2000	TP-2.COM	
"Stroke You Up"	Changing Faces	Robert Kelly‡	Robert Kelly±	1994	Changing Faces	
"Sufferin'"	R. Kelly	Robert Kelly‡	Robert Kelly±	2015	The Buffet (Deluxe Version)	
"Suicide"	R. Kelly	Robert Kelly‡	Robert Kelly±	1998	R.	
"Summer Bunnies"	R. Kelly	Robert Kelly‡	Robert Kelly; Timmy Allen (co.)	1993	12 Play	
"Supaman High" (feat. OJ Da Juiceman)	R. Kelly	Robert Kelly; Otis Williams Jr. Radric Davis; William Hodge II	Willy Will; Robert Kelly	2009	Untitled	
"Superstar"	The Isley Brothers	Robert Kelly‡	Robert Kelly±	2003	Body Kiss	
"Sweet Tooth"	R. Kelly	Robert Kelly‡	Robert Kelly±	2007	Double Up	
"Switch Up" (feat. Lil Wayne & Jeremih)	R. Kelly	Robert Kelly; Jordan Holt; Cem Tomak; Dwayne Carter Jr. Jeremih Felton; Matthew Coleman; Lisa Antwil; Richard Maclean	Robert Kelly; J Holt; Cem T	2015	The Buffet	
"Taxi Driver"	R. Kelly	Robert Kelly‡	Robert Kelly±	2010	Love Letter	
"Tear It Up" (feat. Future)	R. Kelly	Robert Kelly; Nayvadius Wilburn; Dennis-Manuel Peters; Daniel Coriglie; Mario Bakovic	T-Town Productions; Robert Kelly	2013	Black Panties	
"Tempo Slow"	R. Kelly	Robert Kelly‡	Robert Kelly±	1995	R. Kelly	
"Time to Move On"	Sparkle	Robert Kelly‡	Robert Kelly±	1998	Sparkle	
"Thank God It's Friday"	R. Kelly	Robert Kelly‡	Robert Kelly±	1995	R. Kelly	
That Extra Mile (feat. R.Kelly)	The Winans	Robert Kelly; Marvin L. Winans; Carvin Winans	Robert Kelly±	1993	All Out	
"That's That" (feat. R. Kell)	Snoop Dogg	Robert Kelly; Stanley Benton; Calvin Broadus; Tracy Curry	Nottz; Dr. Dre	2006	Tha Blue Carpet Treatment	
"The Thing I Like"	Aaliyah	Robert Kelly‡	Robert Kelly±	1994	Age Ain't Nothing But a Number	
"The World's Greatest"	R. Kelly	Robert Kelly‡	Robert Kelly±	2001	Ali [Original Soundtrack] Loveland (Limited Edition)	
"The Truth"	Truth Hurts	Robert Kelly‡	Robert Kelly±	2002	Truthfully Speaking	
"Thoia Thoing"	R. Kelly	Robert Kelly‡	Robert Kelly±	2003	The R. in R&B Collection, Vol. 1	
"Throw This Money On You"	R. Kelly	Robert Kelly; Nayvadius Wilburn; Dennis-Manuel Peters; Daniel Coriglie; Mario Bakovic	T-Town Productions; Robert Kelly	2013	Black Panties	
"Throw Your Hands Up"	Aaliyah	Robert Kelly‡	Robert Kelly±	1994	Age Ain't Nothing But a Number	
"To the World" (feat. Kanye West, R. Kelly and Teyana Taylor)	Various artists	Robert Kelly; Kanye West; Andrew Wansel; Warren Felder; Che Smith; Malik Jones	Pop Wansel; Oakwud; Kanye West; Hudson Mohawke; Ken Lewis; Mano; Travis Scott; Anthony Kilhoffer	2012	Good Music	
"Touched A Dream"	R. Kelly	Robert Kelly‡	Robert Kelly±	2003	The R. in R&B Collection, Vol. 1	
"Touchin'" (feat. Nivea)	R. Kelly	Robert Kelly‡	Robert Kelly±	2005	TP.3 Reloaded	
"TP-2"	R. Kelly	Robert Kelly‡	Robert Kelly±	2000	TP-2.COM	
"Trade In My Life"	R. Kelly	Robert Kelly‡	Robert Kelly±	1995	R. Kelly	
"Turn Away"	Sparkle	Robert Kelly‡	Robert Kelly±	1998	Sparkle	
"Tryin' to Get a Number" (feat. Nelly)	R. Kelly	Robert Kelly; Cornell Hayes	Robert Kelly; Corey "Keyz" Martin	2007	Double Up	
"U Saved Me"	R. Kelly	Robert Kelly‡	Robert Kelly±	2004	Happy People/U Saved Me	
"Up and Outta Here"	R. Kelly	Robert Kelly‡	Robert Kelly±	2000	Shaft [Original Soundtrack]	
"Vegas"	Sparkle	Robert Kelly‡	Robert Kelly±	1998	Sparkle	
"V.I.P."	R. Kelly	Robert Kelly; DeVante Swing; Dalvin DeGrate	Robert Kelly±	1998	R.	
"Victory"	R. Kelly	Robert Kelly‡	Robert Kelly±	2010	Epic	
"Wake Up Everybody"	R. Kelly	Robert Kelly‡	Robert Kelly±	2015	The Buffet	
"Wanna Be There" (feat. Ariirayé)	R. Kelly	Robert Kelly; Larry Griffin Jr. Stuart Lowery	Robert Kelly; S1; Epikh Pro	2015	The Buffet	
"We Ride" (feat. Cam'Ron, Noreaga, Jay-Z and Vegas Cats)	R. Kelly	Robert Kelly; C. Giles; V. Santiago; S. Carter; Vegas Cats; C. Broadus; A. Young; H. Casey; R. Finch; S. Barnes; J. Oliver; C. Rooney	Robert Kelly; Tone and Poke; Cory Rooney (co.)	1998	R.	
"We Thuggin'" (feat. R. Kelly)	Fat Joe	Ronald Bowser, Joseph Cartagena R. Kelly	Ron G, R. Kelly	2001	Jealous Ones Still Envy (J.O.S.E.)	
"Weatherman"	R. Kelly	Robert Kelly‡	Robert Kelly±	2004	Happy People/U Saved Me	
"What a Girl Wants"	B2K	Robert Kelly‡	Robert Kelly±	2003	Pandemonium! (Special Edition)	
"What About"	Sparkle	Robert Kelly‡	Robert Kelly±	1998	Sparkle	
"What Do I Do"	R. Kelly	Robert Kelly‡	Robert Kelly±	2002	Loveland (Limited Edition)	
"What I Feel / Issues"	R. Kelly	Robert Kelly‡	Robert Kelly±	1998	R.	
"When A Man Lies"	R. Kelly	Robert Kelly‡	Robert Kelly±	2012	Write Me Back	
"When a Woman Loves"	R. Kelly	Robert Kelly‡	Robert Kelly±	2010	Love Letter	
"When A Woman's Fed Up"	R. Kelly	Robert Kelly‡	Robert Kelly±	1998	R.	
"When I Think About You"	R. Kelly	Robert Kelly‡	Robert Kelly±	2004	Happy People/U Saved Me	
"When You Call On Me/Baby That's When I'll Come Runnin"	Luther Vandross	Robert Kelly‡	Robert Kelly±	1997	One Night With You: The Best of Love, Volume 2	
"Where You At"	Jennifer Hudson	Robert Kelly	Robert Kelly	2011	I Remember Me	
"Who's That" (feat. Fat Joe)	R. Kelly	Robert Kelly; Joseph Cartagena	Robert Kelly±	2003	Chocolate Factory	
Why Should I Believe You?	Mya	Robert Kelly‡	Robert Kelly±	1999	Life [Original Soundtrack]	
"What Would You Do?" (feat. The Pied Piper)	The Isley Brother	Robert Kelly‡	Robert Kelly±	2003	Body Kiss	
"Why You Wanna Play Me"	R. Kelly & MGM	Robert Kelly‡	Robert Kelly±	1990	Non-album single	
"Wonderful" (feat. R. Kelly & Ashanti)	Ja Rule	Robert Kelly; Jeffrey Atkins; Irving Lorenzo; Jimi Kendrix	Jimi Kendrix; Irv Gotti	2004	R.U.L.E.	
"Ya Ya Ya" (feat. Lil Wayne)	Nivea	Robert Kelly, Dwayne Carter Jr.	Robert Kelly±	2001	Nivea	
"You Are My World"	R. Kelly	Robert Kelly‡	Robert Kelly±	2012	Write Me Back (Deluxe Edition)	
"You Are Not Alone"	Michael Jackson	Robert Kelly‡	Robert Kelly; Michael Jackson	1995	HIStory: Past, Present and Future, Book I	
"You Are Not Alone"	R. Kelly	Robert Kelly‡	Robert Kelly±	2010	Love Letter (Deluxe Edition)	
"You Deserve Better"	R. Kelly	Robert Kelly; Nayvadius Wilburn; Dennis-Manuel Peters; Daniel Coriglie; Mario Bakovic	T-Town Productions; Robert Kelly	2013	Black Panties	
"You Knock Me Out"	R. Kelly	Robert Kelly‡	Robert Kelly±	2003	Chocolate Factory	
"You Made Me Love You"	R. Kelly	Robert Kelly‡	Robert Kelly±	2003	Chocolate Factory	
"You Remind Me of Something"	R. Kelly	Robert Kelly‡	Robert Kelly±	1995	R. Kelly	
"(You To Be) Be Happy" (feat. The Notorious B.I.G.)	R. Kelly	Robert Kelly; Christopher Wallace	Robert Kelly±	1995	R. Kelly	
"Young Nation"	Aaliyah	Robert Kelly‡	Robert Kelly±	1994	Age Ain't Nothing But a Number	
Your Body's Callin'"	R. Kelly	Robert Kelly‡	Robert Kelly; Timmy Allen (co.)	1993	12 Play	
"The Zoo"	R. Kelly	Robert Kelly‡	Robert Kelly±	2007	Double Up	
"Quality Time"	Hi-Five	Robert Kelly‡	Robert Kelly±	1992	Keep It Goin' On	
