= Ten minutes =

Ten minute or Ten minutes may refer to:

== Time ==
- Ten Minute Rule, for members of parliament
- Flash drama, or 10 minute play

== Films ==
- 10 Minutes (2002 film), a 2002 Bosnian short film
- 10 Minutes (2013 film), a 2013 South Korean film

== Music ==
- "Ten Minutes" (The Get Up Kids song), 1999
- "Ten Minutes" (R. Kelly song), an unreleased song
- "10 Minutes" (Lee Hyori song), 2003
- "10 Minutes" (Inna song), 2010

== See also ==
- Ten Minutes Older, a 2002 film project consisting of two compilation feature films titled The Trumpet and The Cello
- 10 Minute Warning, a hardcore punk band
- 10 Minute School, a bangladeshi online education platform
