= List of unreleased songs recorded by R. Kelly =

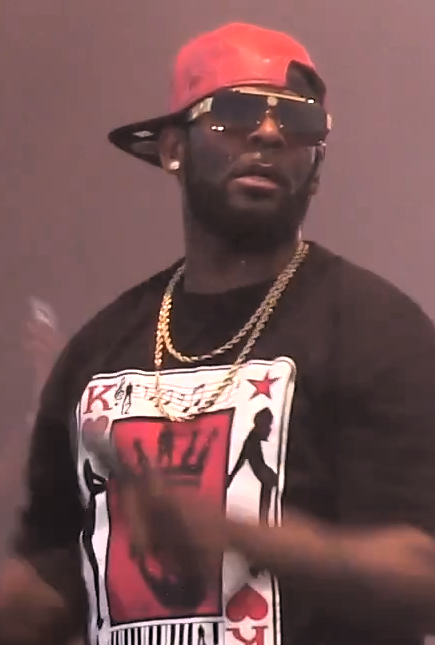
R. Kelly performing in 2017

American singer, songwriter and record producer R. Kelly has released 12 studio albums, 5 compilation albums and 3 collaboration albums. Kelly has sold over 200 million records, making him the most successful R&B male artist of the 1990s and also one of the best selling musical artists of all time. He is listed by Billboard as the most successful R&B/Hip Hop artist of the past 25 years (1985–2010) and also the most successful R&B artist in history.

This is a list of unreleased songs recorded by R. Kelly.

Song	Year	Leaked?	Notes
"#1 Fan"	2009	Yes	Produced by R. Kelly and Carlos McKinney
"Piano Lessons"	2009	Yes	Demo for a female artist
"10 Minutes"	2009	No	Registered to BMI; Failed to make Black Panties; Originally intended to be the first single for Black Panties
"When I Think of Home"	2017	No	Tribute to Chicago
"Planet"	2015	Yes	Failed to make The Buffet; Released in 2019, featured on R. Kelly EP
"Angel"	2011	Yes	Demo for Tyrese
"You Are My World"	2011	Yes	Demo for Michael Jackson; Completed version released on Write Me Back album
"At the Same Time"	2008	Yes	Included on the unreleased 12 Play: 4th Quarter album
"Baby Girl"	2007	Yes	Produced with Pharrell Williams; Failed to be included on Double Up
"Back Up"	2014	Yes	Features rapper Shawnna
"Be With You"	2010	Yes	
"Speaking My Language"	2010	Yes	
"She Deserve"	2016	Yes	
"Best of Both Worlds Ghetto Thriller"	2003	Yes	Collaboration with Birdman; Originally from the unreleased collaboration album with Birdman titled The Best of Both Worlds 2; Later released on an unofficial compilation album titled My Diary Part 2: Love Upon Us, a sequel to My Diary
"Bodied Up"	2014	No	Failed to make Kid Ink's My Own Lane album; Produced by Nic Nac
"Black Panties"	2011	Yes	First song recorded for Black Panties.
"Bobble"	2008	Yes	Features Lil Jon; Incomplete version without Lil Jon also leaked.
"Bump That"	2002	No	Features P. Diddy and Ludacris
"Crazy"	2008	Yes	Demo for Usher; Sequel to Same Girl
"Do What It Do"	2009	Yes	Features 50 Cent
"Don't Say Goodbye to Me"	2009	No	Played at The Ladies Make Some Noise Tour as a tribute to Michael Jackson.
"Firing at the Haters"	2011	Yes	
"Fly"	2002	Yes	From the leaked Loveland album; Remix of "I Believe I Can Fly" featuring Kelly Price
"Fuck Y'all"	2013	Yes	Didn't make Black Panties's final cut.; Unreleased music video.; LQ Snippet leaked online.
"Girls Kissing Girls"	2013	No	Failed to make Black Panties
"Her"	2013	Yes	Features Roscoe Dash
"Home"	2014	No	Was played at the WGCI Summer Jam 2014
"The Lonely"	2008	Yes	From the unofficial compilation album "My Diary Part 2: Love Upon Us", a sequel to My Diary
"Life of the Party"	2008	Yes	Features T.I.
"Kiss Your Candy"	2008	Yes	
"Nothing On"	2012	Yes	
"Rewind That"	2009	Yes	Features Flo Rida
"Heaven Chose You"	2008	Yes	
"Wanna Make a Baby"	2008	Yes	Included on the unreleased 12 Play: 4th Quarter album
"Screamer"	2008	Yes	Included on the unreleased 12 Play: 4th Quarter album
"Might Be Mine"	2008	Yes	Included on the unreleased 12 Play: 4th Quarter album
"Son of a Bitch"	2008	Yes	Included on the unreleased 12 Play: 4th Quarter album
"Freaky Sensation"	2008	Yes	Included on the unreleased 12 Play: 4th Quarter album
"Two Seater"	2008	Yes	Included on the unreleased 12 Play: 4th Quarter album
"Playas Get Lonely"	2008	Yes	Included on the unreleased 12 Play: 4th Quarter album
"Playaz in da Club"	2009	Yes	Features Plies
"I Had a Dream"	2009	Yes	
"Light a Candle"	2010	Yes	
"Super Love"	2010	Yes	featured on “The Demo Tape” as Supa Dupa Man
"I Know You Got a Man (I Don't Care)"	2010	Yes	
"Tongues"	2010	Yes	Features Ludacris; Produced by Bangladesh; Lead single of unreleased album Zodiac
"When She Do It"	2011	Yes	
"So Magical"	2011	Yes	
"Million Dollar Girl"	2011	Yes	
"This Ain't Just No Sex"	2011	Yes	
"You Can Depend on Me"	2011	Yes	
"Like A Stripper"	2011	Yes	
"On Deck"	2011	Yes	
"Joyful People"	2008	Yes	
"Swimmin'"	2012	Yes	Unfinished version leaked
"Top of the World Tonight"	2013	No	Performed at Bonnaroo and Pitchfork festivals, respectively.
"True Baller"	2000	Yes	Failed to be included on TP-2.com
"VIP"	1998	Yes	Features Jay-Z; Recorded during the R. sessions

== See also ==
- List of songs recorded by R. Kelly
