= Black Panties =

Studio album by R. Kelly
- Released: December 6, 2013
- Recorded: October 2011–April 2013
- Genres: R&B; hip hop
- Length: 49:09
- Label: RCA
- Producers: R. Kelly; David Anthony; Mario Bakovic; Cardo; Christopher Clark; Daniel Coriglie; Destin; Lamar Edwards; Donnie Lyle; Cheryl A. Mack; Bigg Makk; John McGee; Beat Mechanix; Marz; Mike Free; Nineteen85; T. Newsome; Rich Nice; Dennis-Manuel Peters; Rahk; Darrick "Devyne" Stephens; Chef Tone; Win; DJ Mustard

R. Kelly chronology
Write Me Back (2012)	Black Panties (2013)	The Buffet (2015)

Deluxe version cover

Singles from Black Panties
- 1. "My Story" Released: July 23, 2013; 2. "Genius" Released: September 17, 2013; 3. "Cookie" Released: November 25, 2013; 4. "Legs Shakin'" Released: March 11, 2014

Black Panties is the twelfth studio album by American R&B singer R. Kelly. It was released in the United States on December 6, 2013, by RCA Records. The album features guest appearances from Ludacris, 2 Chainz, Young Jeezy, Migos, Kelly Rowland, Juicy J and Future.

== Background ==
Black Panties, as says Kelly, "is the new 12 Play (1993)", and that it is different from his previous albums Love Letter (2010) and Write Me Back (2012). In October 2013, in an interview with Rolling Stone, R. Kelly spoke about why he wanted to make the album sound similar to his 1993 debut album, 12 Play, saying: "I love that I can play around with all types of music. I did Love Letter and Write Me Back and those were fun albums for me to do, because they took me back to music I love. But, I wanted to change lanes with this new album and remind people of the TP-2.com and 12 Play style of music I can do—'Kellz music!' I like that I can change lanes and do all different kinds of music. Fans can never accuse R. Kelly of doing the same thing, I keep mixing it up." In December 2013, in an interview with Billboard, R. Kelly spoke about why he decided to name the album Black Panties, saying: "I'm on stage doing the Love Letter tour and I was singing 'Seems Like You're Ready'. Every time I'm singing, panties start flying out of everywhere. Seriously. But this particular night, a pair of mediums came out of the sky and they were black and they landed on my wrist. Immediately I looked at that and looked up like 'that's a sign'. Yeah, the idea hit me right away." Collaborator Jeremih revealed in an interview that he had not been in the studio together with Kelly for the recording process of "Switch Up", but described the working experience as "dope".

== Singles ==
On July 28, 2013, the album's first single "My Story", was released and later peaked at number 89 on the US Billboard Hot 100

On September 24, 2013, the album's second single "Genius" was released.

On November 25, 2013, the album's third single "Cookie" was released. then on December 10, 2013, a music video for the song was released.

"Legs Shakin'" was sent to US urban contemporary radio stations on March 11, 2014, as the album's fourth single.

== Critical reception ==
Professional ratings
Aggregate scores
Source	Rating
Metacritic	61/100
Review scores
Source	Rating
AllMusic	2.5/5 stars
Chicago Tribune	2/4 stars
Consequence of Sound	3/5 stars
Entertainment Weekly	B
Exclaim!	4/10
HipHopDX	3.5/5 stars
The Independent	3/5 stars
Slant Magazine	2.5/5 stars
Spin	5/10
USA Today	3.5/4 stars

Upon its release, Black Panties received mixed reviews from music critics. At Metacritic, which assigns a normalized rating out of 100 to reviews from mainstream critics, the album received an average score of 61, based on 19 reviews, indicating "generally positive reviews". Andy Kellman of AllMusic gave the album two and a half stars out of five, saying "After Love Letter and Write Me Back, classy and relatively polite throwback albums, R. Kelly reverts to sexually exaggerated and wholly contemporary content for Black Panties. Kelly, joined by a deep roster of fellow songwriters and producers, dispenses with the strings, horns, and dashing charm, and dishes out sleaze by the bucket over modern backdrops that slink and whir. All the material is slow and mostly pared down, made to maximize space for his still generous supply of hooks and outlandish rhymes." Nick Catucci of Entertainment Weekly gave the album a B, saying "Black Panties won't humanize the man for anyone who prefers caricature. But his 12th album, a return to wafting sex jams after two soulful dance discs, also falls short of the Kelly we love: the tireless entertainer-as-lover and suavely esoteric devotee of churchy theatrics, inspirational-poster slogans, Chicago stepping music, and extreme wordplay." Greg Kot of the Chicago Tribune gave the album two out of four stars, saying "After two albums of elegant, old-school stepping music, R. Kelly is back doing the raunch. Black Panties is a musically detailed, sonically rich porn soundtrack, a formula that has helped the singer sell more than 50 million albums worldwide in two decades." Omar Burgess of HipHopDX gave the album three and a half stars out of five, saying "Black Panties finds his subject matter about as varied as the play-by-play of two dogs in heat. But what it lacks in lyrical depth it makes up for by being a catchy, entertaining and completely in the moment snapshot of the current turned up, hybrid of R&B and Rap for clubs and bedrooms."

Marah Eakin of The A.V. Club gave the album a B−, saying "Whether Kelly consciously meant to make it one or not, Black Panties could be a big step forward for the sex-positive movement. Or it could just be another R. Kelly record." Jason King of Spin gave the album a five out of ten, saying "Black Panties also happens to be a serious musical step backwards from the melodious Write Me Back. The production is suitably retro 1990s-meets-contemporary-hip-hop: Synth strings and gated drums are matched to pitched-down, chopped & screwed vocals. But the songwriting is the big problem: These are serviceable but mediocre and tuneless slow jams. Then again, no one thinks of 12 Play's “I Like the Crotch on You” as lyrically or musically transcendent, either." Jordan Sargent of Pitchfork Media gave the album a 6.8 out of 10, saying "With Black Panties, what you see is mostly what you get. What we get is a pretty good modern R&B album, but it’s also one that feels just a bit fossilized. With its undulating synths, abundance of screwed vocals and slowly churning tempos, Black Panties sounds suspiciously like the-Dream’s first two albums." Ryan B. Patrick of Exclaim! gave the album a four out of ten, saying "Ultimately, there isn't much to recommend with Black Panties. Kelly is crazy talented, but has always been at his best when he controls his obsessions, not the other way around. Dogged by personal scandals for the better portion of his career, Kelly is unrepentant, unfazed, and unaware that just because he's in on the joke doesn't make it any less funny."

== Commercial performance ==
The album debuted at number 4 on the Billboard 200 chart, with first-week sales of 133,000 copies in the United States. It is R. Kelly's highest-charting album since Untitled (2009) debuted at number four. In its second week, the album fell to number 15 and sold 60,000 more copies, a 55% drop from its first week sales. In its third week, the album sold 44,000 more copies in the United States, falling two spots to number 17. In its fourth week, the album sold 31,000 more copies and rose to number 11 on the US Billboard 200. As of October 2015, the album has sold 462,000 copies in the United States.

== Track listing ==
Standard version
No.	Title	Writer(s)	Producer(s)	Length
1.	"Legs Shakin'" (featuring Ludacris)	Robert Kelly; Christopher Bridges; Lamar Edwards	Marz; Kelly	4:26
2.	"Cookie"	Kelly; Joseph Angel; Winfred Crabtree II; Rebecca Johnson; Aaron Revelle; Destin Mungall	Kelly; Win; T. Newsome; Rahk; Destin	3:45
3.	"Throw This Money on You"	Kelly; Dennis-Manuel Peters; Daniel Coriglie; Mario Bakovic	Kelly; Peters; Coriglie; Bakovic	3:40
4.	"Prelude"			3:11
5.	"Marry the Pussy"	Kelly; Antonio Brown	Kelly; Beat Mechanix	4:14
6.	"You Deserve Better"	Kelly; Peters; Coriglie; Bakovic	Kelly; Peters; Coriglie; Bakovic	3:51
7.	"Genius"	Kelly; Dorrell Mays	Kelly; Bigg Makk	3:59
8.	"All the Way" (featuring Kelly Rowland)	Kelly; Sly Jordan	Kelly; David Anthony; Rich Nice	3:49
9.	"My Story" (featuring 2 Chainz)	Kelly; Tauheed Epps; Paul Jefferies	Kelly; Nineteen85	4:26
10.	"Right Back"	Kelly	Darrick "Devyne" Stephens; Christopher Clark; Kelly; Cheryl A. Mack^{[a]}	3:26
11.	"Spend That" (featuring Young Jeezy)	Kelly; Jay Jenkins; Dijon McFarlane; Mikely Adam	Kelly; DJ Mustard; Mike Free	3:42
12.	"Crazy Sex"	Kelly; Ronald LaTour; Brock Korsan	Kelly; Cardo	2:37
13.	"Shut Up"	Kelly; Mays	Kelly; Bigg Makk	4:03
Total length:				49:09

Deluxe version (bonus tracks)
No.	Title	Writer(s)	Producer(s)	Length
14.	"Tear It Up" (featuring Future)	Kelly; Nayvadius Wilburn; Peters; Coriglie; Bakovic	Kelly; Peters; Coriglie; Bakovic	3:41
15.	"Show Ya Pussy" (featuring Migos & Juicy J)	Kelly; Donnie Lyle; Quavious Marshall; Kirshink Ball; Jordan Houston	Kelly; Lyle	3:37
16.	"Physical"	Kelly; Tony Scales; John McGee	Kelly; Chef Tone; McGee	4:16
17.	"Every Position"	Kelly; Peters; Coriglie; Bakovic	Kelly; Peters; Coriglie; Bakovic	3:26
Total length:				64:10

Japan bonus tracks
No.	Title	Length
18.	"Best at It"	3:08
19.	"Circles"	3:02
Total length:		70:20

Notes

- ^{^[a]} signifies an assistant producer

== Personnel ==
Credits adapted from AllMusic.

- 2 Chainz – featured artist
- Mikely Adam – composer, producer
- J. Angel – composer
- David Anthony – producer
- Chris Athens – mastering
- Diana Copeland – executive assistant
- Mario Bakovic – composer, producer
- Bigg Makk – keyboards, producer
- Sam Bohl – assistant, assistant engineer
- Andre "Drizza Don" Bridges – engineer
- Chris Bridges – composer
- Antonio Brown – composer
- Cardo – producer
- Chris Clark – engineer, producer
- The Closers – producer
- Daniel Coriglie – composer, producer
- Winfred Crabtree II – composer
- Da Beat Mechanix – producer
- Lamar Edwards – composer, producer
- Tauheed Epps – composer
- Meghan Foley – art direction, design
- Abel Garibaldi – engineer, mixing, programming
- Brisha Hemby – make-up
- Dave Huffman – mastering
- Jaycen Joshua – mixing
- Jeezy – featured artist
- Paul Jefferies – composer
- Jay Jenkins – composer
- Rebecca Johnson – composer
- Sly Jordan – composer
- Ryan Kaul – assistant
- R. Kelly – arranger, composer, creative director, mixing, producer, vocals
- Brock Korsan – composer
- Ron LaTour – composer
- Ludacris – featured artist
- Donnie Lyle – guitar, music direction
- Cheryl A. Mack – assistant
- Fabian Marasciullo – mixing
- Dorrell Mays – composer
- Dijon McFarlane – composer, producer
- Ian Mereness – engineer, mixing, programming
- Destin Reza Mungall – composer
- Rich Nice – producer
- Lauren Nikooz – production design
- Megan Nimerosky – assistant
- Nineteen85 – producer
- Chiquita Oden – grooming
- Anthony Patterson – assistant
- Dennis-Manuel Peters – composer, producer
- Rahk – producer
- Aaron Revelle – composer
- Antonio Rey – vocal engineer
- April Rommet – stylist
- Kelly Rowland – featured artist
- Zane Shoemake – assistant
- Darrick Stephens – creative director, producer
- Randee St. Nicholas – photography
- Ryan Supple – assistant
- Win – producer
- Young Jeezy – featured artist

== Charts ==
=== Weekly charts ===
Chart (2013)	Peak position
Belgian Albums (Ultratop Flanders)	159
Belgian Albums (Ultratop Wallonia)	177
Dutch Albums (Album Top 100)	94
UK Albums (OCC)	128
UK R&B Albums (Official Charts)	9
US Billboard 200	4
US Top R&B/Hip-Hop Albums (Billboard)	2

=== Year-end charts ===
Chart (2014)	Peak position
US Billboard 200	41
US Top R&B/Hip-Hop Albums (Billboard)	8
US Top R&B Albums (Billboard)	6

== Certifications ==
Region	Certification	Certified units/sales
United States (RIAA)	Gold	500,000

== Release history ==
Country	Date	Version(s)	Label
Australia	December 13, 2013	Standard (CD, Download); deluxe (CD, Download)	Sony
Belgium	December 6, 2013	Standard (Download); deluxe (Download)	Sony
Brazil	December 10, 2013	Standard (Download); deluxe (Download)	Sony
Canada	December 10, 2013	Standard (CD, Download); deluxe (CD, Download)	Sony
France	December 9, 2013	Standard (CD, Download); deluxe (Download)	Sony
Germany	December 10, 2013	deluxe (CD, Download)	Sony
Japan	December 12, 2013	deluxe (CD, Download)	Sony Music Japan
Netherlands	December 6, 2013	Standard (Download); deluxe (Download)	Sony
New Zealand	December 13, 2013	Standard (Download); deluxe (Download)	Sony
Switzerland	December 6, 2013	Standard (Download); deluxe (Download)	Sony
Thailand	December 9, 2013	Standard (Download); deluxe (Download)	Sony
United Kingdom	December 9, 2013	Standard (Download); deluxe (CD, Download)	RCA
United States	December 10, 2013	Standard (CD, Download); deluxe (CD, Download)	RCA
