= Shut Up (R. Kelly song) =

Song by R. Kelly

from the album Black Panties
- Released: November 10, 2011
- Recorded: 2011
- Genre: R&B
- Length: 4:03
- Label: RCA
- Songwriters: R. Kelly; Mays
- Producers: R. Kelly; Bigg Makk

"Shut Up" is a song written and performed by American R&B singer R. Kelly and included on his twelfth solo studio album Black Panties. Released on November 10, 2011 through YouTube, the song was the first recording he made after throat surgery in 2011.

== Background ==
Following his throat surgery in early 2011, Kelly went to Twitter to announce his return on December 10 same year with a link of his first song he written after the surgery, "Shut Up". The song is to thank his loyal fans and doctors who helped him though the surgery but also to say "shut up" to people who said his career was over and he was washed up.

R. Kelly on his hardest and most emotional song he ever recorded:

I gotta say ‘Shut Up.’ It’s actually the last song off ‘Black Panties.’ The reason I say ‘Shut Up’ is because it was during a real serious time in my life as far as my vocals were concerned. I had a real big abscess, or something like that, on my vocal cords, [and] after doing a show, I collapsed and ended up in the hospital and doing surgery to get it off. After being in the hospital for two days — I was actually in there for six days — but after two days I started hearing rumors and getting texts and hearing people on the radio saying I’m done and this that and the other — although the doctor did tell me that there was a chance I would not be able to sing as strong or something would be a little different.

I was really in the dark. I didn’t know what was going on, but they told me not to go in the studio for another month or two weeks or something like that. That’s like telling me to hold my breath for two weeks, and I couldn’t do that. So I got out the hospital six days later, and went right to the studio and started writing this song called ‘Shut Up.’ I was bleeding, I was crying, I was emotional. I was pissed because you give all these people all of this music for all of these years and you work your butt off to be somebody and to be a legend, and the minute it all looks like it’s going down, they just count you out. I was really hurt by that. So all my emotions went into that song.

== Live performance ==
On December 5, 2013, R. Kelly performed this song for the first time for a live audience on The Arsenio Hall Show.

== Reception ==
Reviews for "Shut Up" were generally positive: Spin wrote, "Kelly taking aim at the haters who said 'he's washed up, he's lost it.' He hasn't. Dude's voice is in prime smooth R&B form".

Lady Gaga encouraged her fans to listen to the song on Twitter and said it empowered her.

Singer Fantasia spoke highly of the song and recommended it to her fans.

K. Michelle made her own version of this song on her mixtape, 0 Fucks Given, released on July 15, 2012.
