= Untitled (R. Kelly album) =

Studio album by R. Kelly
- Released: November 30, 2009
- Recorded: September 2008 – October 2009
- Studio: Trod Nossel Studios
- Genre: R&B
- Length: 62:13
- Label: Jive
- Producers: R. Kelly; Lil' Ronnie; Jazze Pha; Infinity; DJ Camper; Sassieon Hill; Rico Law; John Hill; Los da Mystro; Royalty; Riffraph; Soulshock & Karlin; Willy Will; Jack Splash; Gaz; The Underdogs; Deep; Berris Bolton; DeWayne Swan; T-Town Productions

R. Kelly chronology
Double Up (2007)	Untitled (2009)	Love Letter (2010)

Singles from Untitled
- 1. "Number One" Released: July 28, 2009; 2. "Religious" Released: October 10, 2009; 3. "Echo" Released: October 10, 2009

Untitled (originally titled 12 Play: 4th Quarter) is the ninth studio album by American R&B recording artist R. Kelly. It was released in the UK on November 30, 2009, and in the US by Jive Records on December 1, 2009. It was entirely produced by R. Kelly and a team of younger producers.

== Background ==
In 2008, the album's title was initially supposed to be released under the name 12 Play: 4th Quarter, however, that version of this project leaked before release and so it was decided that the whole project should be re-recorded. That title is still referenced in several songs on the album.

== Singles ==
Supaman High featuring OJ da Juiceman was supposed to be the album's lead single, but due to a label and artist dispute, it was repurposed as a promotional single for the album.

The album's lead single, "Number One" featuring Keri Hilson, was released on July 28, 2009. The song peaked at number 59 on the US Billboard Hot 100 and number 7 on the Hot R&B/Hip-Hop Songs charts.

Both second and third singles, "Religious" and "Echo" (both released October 10, 2009), charted lower, with peak positions of numbers 48 and 52 respectively on the Hot R&B/Hip-Hop Songs.

== Critical reception ==
Professional ratings
Review scores
Source	Rating
Allmusic	3.5/5 stars
The A.V. Club	C+
Entertainment Weekly	C+
The Daily Telegraph	4/5 stars
The Guardian	2/5 stars
Pitchfork Media	4.8/10
Rolling Stone	3.5/5 stars
Slant Magazine	2/5 stars
Spin	7/10

Untitled received generally mixed to positive reviews from music critics. At Metacritic, which assigns a normalized rating out of 100 to reviews from mainstream critics, the album received an average score of 62, based on 15 reviews, which indicates "generally favorable reviews". Allmusic writer Andy Kellman gave it three-and-a-half out of five stars and called it "a simple, concept-free, creatively unambitious R&B album". Mikael Wood of Spin complimented the album's "fresh raunch", noting "'Bangin' the Headboard' and 'Pregnant' (as in 'You make me wanna get you…') are bawdy even by Kelly's considerable standards". Tom Horan of The Daily Telegraph praised Kelly's "unwavering focus" and stated, "should headboard-banging be in the offing, this will make a fine accompaniment."

In a mixed review, The A.V. Club's Nathan Rabin gave the album a C+ rating and commented that it "feels generic". Drew Hinshaw of The Village Voice found it lacking any "larger themes from Untitled's sex seminars" and stated, "It's tragic to see a master of r&b finesse fall back onto a childish, domineering bent that comes off as boorish, entitled, and mean-spirited." Chicago Tribune writer Greg Kot wrote that Kelly "massages simple (and sometimes simplistic) words into hooks through phrasing that is pliant, inventive, audacious, sometimes silly", commenting that "That ardor is framed by music that is everything his lyrics are not: subtle, ornate, at times downright refined. As a producer and arranger, he is meticulous with detail, orchestrating hand claps, finger snaps and drum machines to create just the right rhythm backdrop for an evening of 'wooo and weee'". Jon Pareles of The New York Times found the album "routine" for Kelly, although he stated, "Still, even a routine R. Kelly song outshines much of the competition."

=== Accolades ===
In 2011, Untitled was nominated for a Grammy Award for Best Contemporary R&B Album, presented at the 53rd Grammy Awards.

== Commercial performance ==
The album debuted at number 4 on the US Billboard 200, selling 110,000 copies in its first week, marking his ninth top five album on the chart. It also reached the top of the Top R&B/Hip-Hop Albums chart.

== Track listing ==
Untitled track listing
No.	Title	Writer(s)	Producer(s)	Length
1.	"Crazy Night" (featuring Rock City)	Robert Kelly; Ronnie Jackson; Maurice Simmonds; Theron Thomas; Timothy Thomas	Kelly; Lil' Ronnie	3:35
2.	"Exit"	R. Kelly; Phalon Alexander; Larry Nix; Kassim Vonicco Washington	R. Kelly; Jazze Pha	4:06
3.	"Echo"	R. Kelly; Infinity; Darhyl Camper; Claude Kelly	R. Kelly; Infinity; DJ Camper	3:58
4.	"Bangin' the Headboard"	R. Kelly; Camper; Sassieon Hill; Infinity; Miguel "Rico Law" Jiminez	R. Kelly; Infinity; Camper; Hill; Law	3:14
5.	"Go Low"	R. Kelly	R. Kelly	3:51
6.	"Whole Lotta Kisses"	R. Kelly	R. Kelly	4:30
7.	"Like I Do"	R. Kelly; C. Kelly; Carlos McKinney	R. Kelly; Los da Mystro	3:40
8.	"Number One" (featuring Keri Hilson)	R. Kelly; Hilson; Roy "Royalty" Hamilton; Raphael "Riffraph" Hamilton	R. Kelly; Royalty; Riffraph	4:21
9.	"I Love the DJ"	R. Kelly; Rob Allen; Carsten Schack; Kenneth Karlin	R. Kelly; Soulshock & Karlin	3:45
10.	"Supaman High" (featuring OJ da Juiceman)	R. Kelly; Otis Williams, Jr.; Radric Davis; William Hodge	R. Kelly; Willy Will	4:24
11.	"Be My #2"	R. Kelly; Paul L. Kyser; Jack Splash; Leon Stuckey	R. Kelly; Splash	4:52
12.	"Text Me"	R. Kelly; Gasner "Gaz" Hughes	R. Kelly; Gaz	4:20
13.	"Religious"	R. Kelly; Warryn CampbellEric Dawkins; Antonio Dixon; Tyrese Gibson	R. Kelly; The Underdogs	3:03
14.	"Elsewhere"	R. Kelly; Chris Henderson; Johnny "JB" Truelove	R. Kelly; Deep	4:36
15.	"Pregnant" (featuring Tyrese, Robin Thicke, and The-Dream)	R. Kelly; Berris Bolton; Leon Dewayne Swan; Terius Nash	R. Kelly; Bolton; Swan	6:00

Japanese bonus track
No.	Title	Writer(s)	Producer(s)	Length
16.	"Fallin' from the Sky (Write Me Back)"	R. Kelly; Truelove; Dennis-Manuel Peters; Mario Bakovic; Daniel Coriglie	R. Kelly; T-Town Productions	4:25

== Charts ==
=== Weekly charts ===
Weekly chart performance for Untitled
Chart (2009)	Peak position
French Albums (SNEP)	157
South African Albums (RSG)	19
US Billboard 200	4
US Digital Albums (Billboard)	5
US Top R&B/Hip-Hop Albums (Billboard)	1

=== Year-end charts ===
Year-end chart performance for Untitled
Chart (2010)	Position
US Billboard 200	109
US Top R&B/Hip-Hop Albums (Billboard)	27

== Release history ==
Untitled release history
Region	Date	Format	Label	Ref(s)
United Kingdom	November 30, 2009	Clean version	Sony Music Entertainment	88697599152
United States	December 1, 2009	Clean version	Jive Records	886973113721
United States	December 1, 2009	Explicit lyrics	Jive Records	886973113622

== See also ==
- List of number-one R&B albums of 2009 (U.S.)
