= Supaman High =

Promotional single by R. Kelly featuring OJ da Juiceman

from the album Untitled
- Released: June 12, 2009
- Recorded: 2008
- Genre: Hip hop
- Length: 4:24
- Label: Jive/Zomba
- Songwriters: R. Kelly, Otis Williams, Jr., Radric Davis, William Hodge
- Producers: R. Kelly, Willy Will

"Supaman High" is a song by American R&B singer R. Kelly featuring OJ da Juiceman, written by R. Kelly, OJ da Juiceman, Gucci Mane and Willy Will for his ninth studio album, Untitled (2009). It was produced by Kelly and Willy Will.

The record was originally intended be released as the album's lead single. However, as the label and the singer were not in agreement with the song becoming the first single, R. Kelly set up additional sessions to find a new single ("Number One" featuring Keri Hilson). Hence the song served to generate marketing buzz.

== Charts ==
Chart (2010)	Peak position
US Hot R&B/Hip-Hop Songs (Billboard)	46
