= Willy Will =

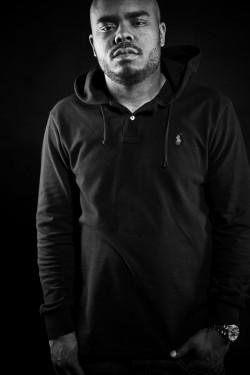
Producer Willy Will 2011

William Hodge II (born August 28, 1982), better known as Willy Will, is an American Grammy Award nominated record producer from Louisville, Kentucky. Willy Will began his career working with Static Major and Polow Da Don. He produced three tracks on Lil Wayne's "Tha Carter IV": "Intro", "Interlude" and "Outro". Willy Will has also worked with E-40, Rihanna, R. Kelly, Missy Elliott, Sean Garrett, OJ Da Juiceman, Rick Ross, Nas, Andre 3000, Busta Rhymes and Ice Cube.

== Notable productions ==
Artist	Album	Label	Date	Tracks
Jack Harlow	Confetti	Generation NOW / Atlantic	2019	Heavy Hitters
Jack Harlow	Loose	Generation NOW / Atlantic	2018	Like This
B.o.B.	NAGA	No Genre	2018	Cuello; Elbows
Jack Harlow	Gazebo	Generation NOW / Atlantic	2017	Routine
Gizzle	7 Days In Atlanta	Independent	2017	Oh Na Na; Cutlery
E-40	The D-Boy Diary: Book 1 & 2	Heavy On the Grind / EMI	2016	Check (feat. Willy Will); Thank U (feat. Willy Will)
E-40 & Too Short	History: Function Music	Heavy On the Grind / EMI	2016	Entrepreneur
Busta Rhymes	Year of the Dragon	Google Play	2012	"Bleed the Same Blood" (feat. Maino, & Anthony Hamilton)
E-40	The Block Brochure: Welcome to the Soil 2 & 3	Heavy On the Grind / EMI	2012	Scorpio feat. Tech N9ne & London; I Ain't Doin' Nothin feat. B-Legit & Willy Will
Lil Wayne	Tha Carter IV	YMCM / Universal	2011	Intro; Interlude ft. Tech N9ne & Andre 3000; Outro ft. Bun B, Nas, Shyne, Busta Rhymes
E-40	Revenue Retrievin': Overtime Shift	Heavy On The Grind / EMI	2011	Me And My Bitch; M.O.B.
Rihanna	Loud	Def Jam	2010	Fading
Ice Cube	I Am the West	Lench Mob / EMI	2010	Yall Know How I Am
E-40	Revenue Retrievin': Day Shift	Heavy On the Grind / EMI	2010	Duck; Dem Boyz; I'ma Teach You How To Sell Dope
Shanell	We Are Young Money	YMCM / Universal	2009	Play In My Band feat. Lil Wayne
R. Kelly	Untitled	Jive	2009	Supaman High feat. OJ Da Juiceman
Rich Boy	Rich Boy	Zone 4 / Interscope	2008	Good Things feat. Keri Hilson & Polow Da Don
E-40	The Ball Street Journal	Warner Brothers	2008	Slidin Down the Pole feat. Too $hort
