= Echo (R. Kelly song) =

Single by R. Kelly

from the album Untitled
- Released: October 10, 2009
- Recorded: 2009 at Patchwerk Studios, Atlanta, GA
- Genre: R&B
- Length: 3:58
- Label: Jive
- Songwriter(s): Kelly • Jordan Suecof • Darhyl Camper • Claude Kelly
- Producer(s): Kelly • Infinity • Darhyl "DJ" Camper

R. Kelly singles chronology
"Religious" (2009)	"Echo" (2009)	"Ms. Chocolate" (2010)

"Echo" is the third official single from American R&B singer R. Kelly's 2009 album, Untitled. The song is noted for its use of yodeling.

== Chart History ==
Chart (2009–10)	Peak position
U.S. Billboard Hot R&B/Hip-Hop Songs	52

== Reception ==
Mother Jones gave a mixed review, calling the song a "typical R. Kelly hook" but stating that "R. Kelly is somehow endearing." The Oregonian gave a positive review, praising the yodeling. Pitchfork also gave a positive review, saying that the "track's atmosphere is a gorgeous blanket of appropriately airy beauty."
