= My Story (R. Kelly song) =

Single by R. Kelly featuring 2 Chainz

from the album Black Panties
- Released: July 23, 2013
- Recorded: 2013
- Genre: Hip hop; trap; R&B
- Length: 3:36
- Label: RCA
- Songwriters: Robert Kelly; Paul Jefferies; Tauheed Epps
- Producers: Nineteen85; R. Kelly

R. Kelly singles chronology
"When a Man Lies" (2012)	"My Story" (2013)	"Do What U Want" (2013)

2 Chainz singles chronology
"When I Feel Like It" (2013)	"My Story" (2013)	"Talk Dirty" (2013)

"My Story" is a single by American R&B singer R. Kelly featuring 2 Chainz, written by R. Kelly who co-produced it with Nineteen85 from OVO Sound, for his twelfth solo studio album Black Panties. A snippet of the song was first heard at the BET Awards same year, then another a week after the award ceremony. The song was released on July 23, 2013, via R. Kelly's Vevo, and on iTunes a day later. The second snippet was not in the official song, but later heard on the extended version of the song. The song debuted and peaked at number 89 on the US Billboard Hot 100 during the week of the album's release after many weeks on the Bubbling Under chart. It is also R. Kelly's final appearance on the Hot 100 chart. No official music video was released, but a documentary music video was uploaded on R. Kelly's Vevo channel. A fan video was expected, but was never released.

== Music video ==
On August 30 2013, the documentary music video was uploaded on YouTube. A fan video was expected, but was never released. No official music video was made for the song.

== Remixes ==
On November 18, 2013, Chicago Remix of "My Story" featured Chicago rappers Katie Got Bandz and Rockie Fresh. On December 5, 2013, the LA Remix of "My Story", featuring rappers Too Short and Nipsey Hussle.

== Live performance ==
R. Kelly performed this song for the first time on BET 2013 with a golden cap and jacket with spikes. R. Kelly performed "My Story" for the first time with the featuring artist 2 Chainz at Jimmy Kimmel Live! on the fifth of December 2013.

== Critical reception ==
"My Story" has received average ratings, with critics displaying mixed feelings for the song. Rolling Stone gave it three stars out of five.

== Formats and track listings ==
- Digital download
1. "My Story" feat. 2 Chainz – 3:36

== Chart performance ==
=== Weekly charts ===
Chart (2013)	Peak position
US Billboard Hot 100	89
US Hot R&B/Hip-Hop Songs (Billboard)	27
Chart (2014)	Peak position
US Hot R&B/Hip-Hop Songs (Billboard)	27

=== Year-end charts ===
Chart (2014)	Position
US Hot R&B Songs (Billboard)	48
