= Soldier's Heart (song) =

Single by R. Kelly

from the album My Diary
- Released: 2003
- Recorded: 2002
- Genre: R&B
- Length: 4:30
- Label: Jive
- Songwriter: R. Kelly
- Producer: R. Kelly

R. Kelly singles chronology
"Snake" (2003)	"Soldier's Heart" (2003)	"Clubbin'" (2003)

"Soldier's Heart" is a 2002 song by R. Kelly. Written and produced by Kelly himself, it is a tribute to the soldiers of the United States. It was released as a single in 2003 and appeared on an official compilation album called My Diary released in 2005, renamed "Front Line". Kelly donated all the proceeds from the song to the families of American soldiers. The song peaked at number 80 on the Billboard Hot 100 singles chart.

== Music video ==
Kelly recorded two videos for this song, a music video and an AOL Live performance. The music video shows R. Kelly playing the piano and also singing in front of the American flag with Hart Hollman & The Motown Romance Orchestra.

== Live performance ==
Kelly later performed this song live on The Arsenio Hall Show in 2013 as a tribute to the late Nelson Mandela.

== Track listing ==
US CD single

1. "Soldier's Heart"

== Chart performance ==
Chart (2003)	Peak position
US Billboard Hot 100	80
US Hot R&B/Hip-Hop Songs (Billboard)	84
