= Heaven I Need a Hug =

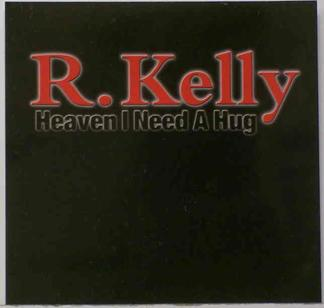

Promotional single by R. Kelly

from the album Loveland (Bonus Disc)
- Released: March 2003
- Recorded: 2002
- Genre: R&B
- Length: 5:12
- Label: Jive
- Songwriter(s): R. Kelly
- Producer(s): R. Kelly

"Heaven I Need a Hug" is a song by R&B singer R. Kelly, written and produced by Kelly himself. It was featured on the Loveland bonus disc accompanying certain editions of his fifth solo studio album Chocolate Factory. The song reached number 26 on the US R&B chart and 4 on the Billboard Bubbling Under Hot 100 Singles chart. No music video was made for the song. The song charted quite well without getting significant promotion.

== Background ==
The song was written in response to the 2002 sex tape scandal, according to WGCI Program Director Elroy Smith, who said he met with Kelly and waited until he got permission from Kelly's label before airing the track.

In the mid-tempo ballad, Kelly accuses his detractors of rushing to judgement, criticizes women for dependence on men, asks the media to give him a break, and begs for a little human tenderness ("Heaven, I need a hug/ Is there anybody out there willing to embrace a thug?" goes the chorus).

Kelly sings, "I gave 13 years of my life to this industry/ Hit song or not, I've given all of me/ You smile in my face and tell me that you love/ But then before you know the truth you're so quick to judge me."

Kelly goes on to blame his current troubles on his celebrity, a belief he also put forth in his May interview with MTV News (see "R . Kelly: In His Own Words"). He sings, "Seems like the more money I make/ The more drama y'all try to create/ The more I try to move into the positive/ The more y'all don't want to let me live/ When will you realize that I don't owe you nothin?/ Need to get up off your butt and go make your own something"

== Live performances ==
Kelly has only occasionally performed the song at concerts.

== Commercial response ==
WGCI reported that within 90 minutes of adding the song to the playlist on Tuesday evening, "Heaven I Need a Hug" became one of the station's most requested songs.

== Formats and track listings ==
- CD promo
1. "Heaven I Need a Hug" – 5:12

== Charts ==
Chart (2002)	Peak position
US Billboard Bubbling Under Hot 100 Singles	4
US Billboard Hot R&B/Hip-Hop Songs	26
US Billboard Radio Chart	84
