= Religious (song) =

Single by R. Kelly

from the album Untitled
- Released: October 10, 2009
- Recorded: 2009 at The Chocolate Factory, Chicago, Illinois
- Genre: R&B; soul; gospel
- Length: 3:07
- Label: Jive
- Songwriters: R. Kelly; Eric Dawkins; Antonio "Todd" Dixon; Warryn Campbell; Tyrese Gibson
- Producers: R. Kelly; Dawkins; Dixon

R. Kelly singles chronology
"Number One" (2009)	"Religious" (2009)	"Echo" (2009)

"Religious" is the second single from American R&B singer R. Kelly's studio album, Untitled (2009). The song was released on October 10, 2009, on R. Kelly's YouTube channel. The single was confirmed in R. Kelly's Twitter.

== Chart performance ==
Chart (2009–10)	Peak position
U.S. Billboard Hot R&B/Hip-Hop Songs	48
