= When a Man Lies =

Single by R. Kelly

from the album Write Me Back
- Released: October 15, 2012
- Recorded: 2012
- Genre: Blues; R&B; soul
- Length: 3:36
- Label: RCA
- Songwriter(s): Robert Kelly
- Producer(s): R. Kelly

R. Kelly singles chronology
"I Look to You" (2012)	"When a Man Lies" (2012)	"My Story" (2013)

"When a Man Lies" is a single by American R&B singer R. Kelly, and the third from his Love Letter sequel solo album Write Me Back, The song was both written and produced by Kelly himself. No official music video was made for this song.

== Charts ==
Chart (2012)	Peak position
CIS Airplay (TopHit)	160
US Adult R&B Songs (Billboard)	8
