= Number One (R. Kelly song) =

Single by R. Kelly featuring Keri Hilson

from the album Untitled
- Released: July 28, 2009
- Genre: R&B
- Length: 4:20
- Label: Jive
- Songwriters: Robert Kelly; Keri Hilson; Roy Hamilton; Raphael Hamilton
- Producers: Kelly; Riffraph Hamilton; Royalty Hamilton

R. Kelly singles chronology
"I Believe" (2008)	"Number One" (2009)	"Religious" (2009)

Keri Hilson singles chronology
"Slow Dance" (2009)	"Number One" (2009)	"Everything, Everyday, Everywhere" (2009)

"Number One" is the first single featuring Keri Hilson from American R&B singer R. Kelly's 2009 album, Untitled. The song was released digitally on July 28, 2009.

== Music video ==
The music video was released on August 17, 2009. In the video, Kelly and Hilson wear Michael Jackson-inspired jackets and pay tribute to the late King of Pop in the Chris Robinson-directed clip. The video was listed number #92 on BET notarized top 100 videos.

== Remix ==
The official remix features R&B singers T-Pain and Keyshia Cole. It was released September 29, 2009 on Kelly's YouTube account and the internet. The final version was released two days later, October 1, 2009, with ad-libs by Keyshia Cole on the chorus after her verse. J. Holiday uses the lines "Ooh ooh," from J. Holiday's 2007 hit, "Bed" The digital download single of the remix was released on October 27, 2009.

== Charts ==
=== Weekly charts ===
Chart (2009)	Peak position
Sweden (Sverigetopplistan)	58
US Billboard Hot 100	59
US Hot R&B/Hip-Hop Songs (Billboard)	8
US Rhythmic Airplay (Billboard)	31

=== Year-end charts ===
Chart (2009)	Position
US Hot R&B/Hip-Hop Songs (Billboard)	61
