= I Admit =

2018 song by R. Kelly

Song by R. Kelly
- Released: July 23, 2018
- Genre: R&B
- Length: 19:11
- Label: Self-released
- Songwriters: Robert Kelly; Raphael Ramos Oliveira
- Producers: R. Kelly; Noc

"I Admit" (Note: Also known as "I Admit It" or "I Admit It (I Did It)") is a 19-minute song by American singer R. Kelly. Released on SoundCloud on July 23, 2018, the song addresses the singer's sexual abuse scandals. Kelly wrote "I Admit" with Raphael Ramos Oliveira and produced it with Noc. In the recording, Kelly makes a number of confessions, including that he is dyslexic, that he has been sexually unfaithful, and that he was raped. Kelly does not make any criminal admissions, but instead denies allegations of domestic violence and pedophilia. The release of "I Admit" followed a 2017 BuzzFeed News investigative report by Jim DeRogatis which alleged that Kelly operated a "sex cult", and a 2018 boycott of Kelly backed by Time's Up. The lyrics rebuke DeRogatis and disavow the report's "sex cult" claims.

Critics reviewed "I Admit" unfavorably. Some reviewers contrasted the title with the lack of criminal admissions in the lyrics and described the song as an act of trolling. The song was compared to Kelly's rap opera Trapped in the Closet and O. J. Simpson's book If I Did It, which addressed Simpson's allegations of murder. Reviewers noted that Kelly's lyrics more closely resemble a self-defense than an admission or mea culpa. The release of "I Admit" led to a response from DeRogatis, who defended his journalism in two interviews. R. Kelly's ex-wife, Andrea Kelly, and brother, Carey "Killa" Kelly, individually released songs in response to "I Admit" that contain additional allegations against R. Kelly. The song also attracted criticism on social media.

== Background and release ==
Time's Up advocated for a boycott of Kelly's music in 2018.

"I Admit" was Kelly's first release since his 2016 holiday album, 12 Nights of Christmas.

In July 2017, Jim DeRogatis contributed an article to BuzzFeed News detailing legal investigations from three families regarding their daughters' alleged kidnappings after they established relationships with Kelly. The article characterized Kelly's operations as a "cult" and included interviews with three of Kelly's former associates. Both Kelly and the daughters rejected the claims at the time.

In April 2018, the Women of Color branch of the Time's Up movement announced their support for the Mute R. Kelly social media campaign, which advocated for music venues to cancel Kelly's concert dates and for Sony Music to terminate Kelly's recording contract. The organization published a demand on The Root for RCA Records, Ticketmaster, Spotify, Apple Music, and the Greensboro Coliseum Complex to end their business relationships with Kelly. Spotify removed the music of Kelly, XXXTentacion, and Tay-K from their playlists after introducing a "hate content and hateful conduct" policy in May 2018, but rescinded the policy in June 2018 after people in the music industry, including Kendrick Lamar's and Top Dawg Entertainment's representatives, accused the company of censorship.

Kelly played a preview of "I Admit" on Instagram Live one day prior to its full debut. On July 23, 2018, the song was released on the SoundCloud account of Julius Darrington, CEO of the AudioDream record label. Kelly promoted the release with a post, "Today is the day you've been waiting for", across Facebook, Twitter, and Instagram. RCA Records, his label at the time, did not confirm whether they were associated with the song when asked by Variety.

After the January 2019 broadcast of the Surviving R. Kelly documentary series chronicling the extent of the allegations against Kelly, the singer appeared in a CBS This Morning interview on March 8, 2019, in which Gayle King asked him whether "I Admit" was his "way of confessing". Kelly responded, "That question makes no sense, no offense, but what I'm saying is this: 'I Admit' was me expressing my feelings about the things I was going through. If you're listening to it, you can hear exactly what I'm admitting."

== Lyrics ==
"I Admit"
A sample of "I Admit" containing the "I admit it, I did it" chorus and the first four lines of the seventh verse, in which Kelly questions the definitions of the terms cult and sex slave

In "I Admit", Kelly admits to various acts, including dropping out of high school and not attending church. Kelly reveals he that was diagnosed with dyslexia and asserts that his inability to read his recording contract caused him to forfeit publishing rights to his music, which contributed to the singer's financial troubles, including his $20 million tax debt to the Internal Revenue Service. In the song, Kelly confesses that he has been sexually unfaithful and frequented strip clubs. Kelly reveals that he lost his virginity in his childhood when he was raped by an older female family member, elaborating on the disclosures from his 2012 autobiography, Soulacoaster: The Diary of Me.

Despite the song's title and Kelly's repetition of the lyric "I admit it, I did it" in the chorus, "I Admit" does not contain any criminal admissions. Kelly denies accusations of domestic violence, involvement in a "sex cult", and pedophilia in his lyrics, dismissing them as matters of opinion. Kelly does not admit guilt regarding the 2008 acquittal of his sex tape allegations, but maintains that he has been "falsely accused" and sings that his lawyer advised him to "don't say noth'". Although Kelly admits to having casual sex with "both older and young ladies", he states that all of them were "over age". The singer recounts a meeting with Wendy Williams in which he described his feelings for Aaliyah, whom he illegally married in 1994 when she was 15 years old, as "love".

The lyrics denounce DeRogatis for profiting from his reports of Kelly's scandals, and John Legend, Steve Harvey, and Tom Joyner for refusing to publicly defend Kelly from his accusers. In response to the Mute R. Kelly campaign, Kelly sings, "only God can mute me". Kelly expresses support for a "women's group", but also exclaims that "they tryna lock me up like Bill", referring to Bill Cosby, who at the time was awaiting incarceration after his April 2018 sexual assault convictions. Kelly finishes the song by telling the audience to "stay the fuck out of my business", and inviting his birthplace of Chicago to use his image as inspiration for city youth.

== Critical reception ==
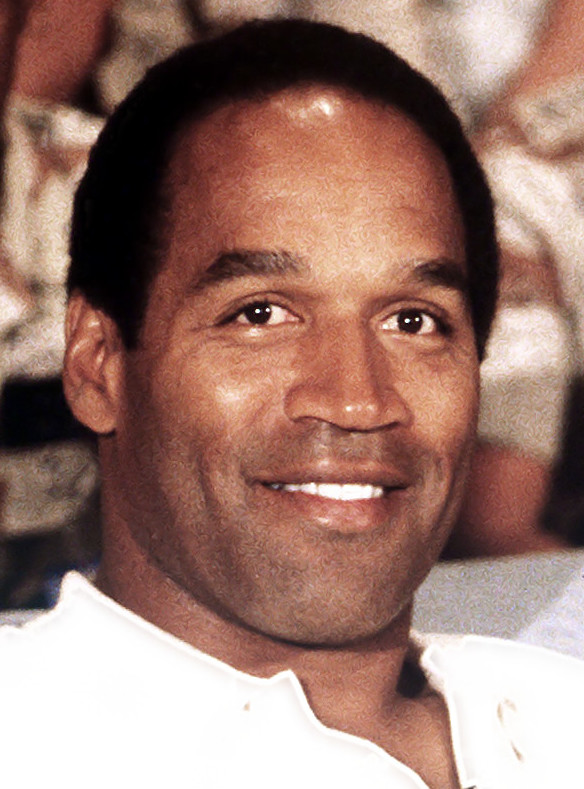
"I Admit" was compared to If I Did It, a book by O. J. Simpson (pictured).

Several reviewers characterized "I Admit" as an act of trolling, since the name of the song overstates the magnitude of the admissions contained within the lyrics. Multiple critics noted similarities between this song and If I Did It, a book by O. J. Simpson that contains a hypothetical description of the alleged murder in Simpson's murder case. Writing for The Daily Beast, Stereo Williams described the song as "20 minutes of defensive rambling and R. Kelly nailing himself to a cross". Williams asserted that Kelly "paints himself as the victim: the victim of the media, of sycophants, of his childhood abuser, of his own illiteracy" while "baiting his critics with a number of shockingly brazen lyrical references to his behavior".

In a review for The Atlantic, Hannah Giorgis compared the song's structure to Kelly's rap opera Trapped in the Closet and remarked, "The specter of harmful actions is softened by the harmonies of the lullaby." Giorgis described Kelly's delivery as "a stomach-churning mix of self-pity and hubris" and criticized Kelly for refusing to address the alleged victims directly. She noted that "at no point does he speak to—rather than at or about—the women who have come forward" and wrote, "none of the women who have recounted tales of Kelly's abuse is worthy of being the hero in this story. Kelly, and Kelly alone, occupies that mantle."

Ann-Derrick Gaillot of The Outline considered "I Admit" a "bad song" and "a 20-minute long plea to save his dying career", stating that the release of the song demonstrated that Kelly was "no longer invincible". In Rolling Stone, Michael Arcenaux lambasted Kelly for attempting to "invoke his own trauma to excuse the grief he is alleged to have caused in so many women and girls". Broadly's Leila Ettachfini labeled the song as "a bizarre attempt to garner some sympathy from the public in hopes that it could somehow absolve Kelly for his alleged crimes against women and girls", but remarked that "the song doesn't seem to be achieving Kelly's desired effect".

== Responses ==
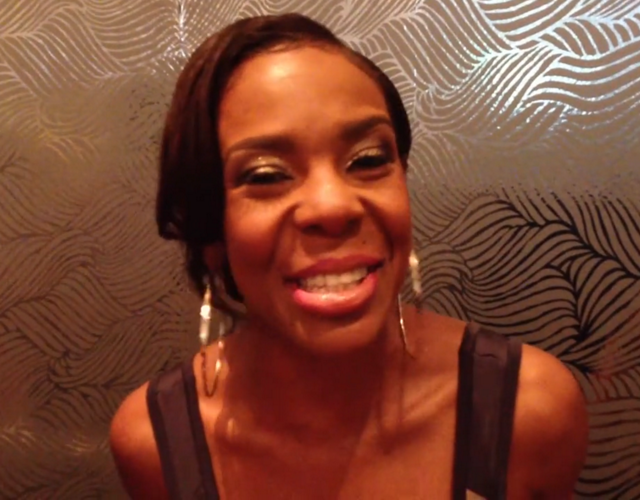
Kelly's ex-wife, dancer and choreographer Andrea Kelly (pictured), shared lyrics to "Admit It", her remix of "I Admit".

In interviews with Variety and Billboard, DeRogatis denied that his reporting of Kelly's allegations had been a significant factor in his own career growth. DeRogatis defended his continued coverage of Kelly by disclosing that he still received calls from sources. He said, "You're not a journalist or a human being if you get those calls and do not do your job." Regarding the song's composition, DeRogatis saw "I Admit" as a continuation of Kelly's 10-minute remix of "I Believe I Can Fly" from his unreleased album, Loveland, in which Kelly sings a plea to Saint Peter at the gates of heaven.

Andrea Kelly, R. Kelly's ex-wife, shared lyrics to her remix titled "Admit It" on Instagram on July 24, 2018. In her remix, Andrea alleges that R. Kelly physically abused her and neglected their children. In response to a lyric on "I Admit" where R. Kelly describes his relationship with his deceased mother, Joanne Kelly, Andrea sings that Joanne would disapprove of his actions. Andrea also accuses R. Kelly of being a "dead beat dad" and urges him to obtain "professional help".

R. Kelly's brother, Carey "Killa" Kelly, released a diss track named "I Confess" on YouTube on August 3, 2018. Replying to R. Kelly's claim on "I Admit" that Carey abandoned him, Carey echoes an April 2018 sexual misconduct allegation in which a woman accused R. Kelly of intentionally giving her a sexually transmitted infection. In "I Confess", Carey also implies that R. Kelly had sex with other men.

Black Twitter responded negatively to "I Admit", with many users expressing disgust at the song's lyrical content. The song was poorly received by other artists; Talib Kweli remarked that Kelly's "lack of self awareness is atrocious" and Questlove tweeted, "#IAdmit I want my 19 mins back". The co-founder of the Mute R. Kelly social media campaign, Oronike Odeleye, called the song a "19-minute sex trafficking fundraising anthem" and interpreted its release as an indicator of Mute R. Kelly's success. In an interview with the Associated Press, Odeleye reaffirmed the campaign's efforts to eliminate Kelly's remaining concert dates.

Rape, Abuse & Incest National Network spokeswoman Jodi Omear criticized the song's lyrics and stated, "Laws aren't opinions". An attorney representing the family of Joycelyn Savage, one of the daughters mentioned in DeRogatis's BuzzFeed News article, rebuked Kelly for trying to "shift the narrative" and demanded Savage's release.

== Aftermath ==
Kelly was convicted of nine criminal counts, including racketeering (involving sexual exploitation of a child, kidnapping, bribery, and sex trafficking) and violations of the Mann Act, on September 28, 2021. A few fans of Kelly played "I Admit" beside the courthouse shortly after the judgment was issued.

On December 9, 2022, a bootleg album titled I Admit It, containing 13 unreleased, previously leaked, and previously released tracks by Kelly, briefly appeared on Spotify, Apple Music, and other streaming services before it was taken down on the same day. The collection included "I Admit", which was retitled as "I Admit It (I Did It)" and divided into three tracks. (Note: "I Admit It (I Did It), Pt. 1" (track 11, length 4:11); "I Admit It (I Did It), Pt. 2" (track 12, length 7:25); and "I Admit It (I Did It), Pt. 3" (track 13, length 7:35)) An attorney for Kelly and a representative of Sony Music both denied involvement in the album. Its copyright notice carried the name of Legacy Recordings—the catalog division of Sony Music, but lacked a Sony Music Entertainment copyright notice used by the division's actual releases. A source disclosed that the bootleg was released by the Los Angeles–based label Real Talk Entertainment and distributed by Ingrooves, which led to Ingrooves—a subsidiary of Universal Music Group—ending its relationship with Real Talk following the album's release.

== See also ==
- Harvey Weinstein sexual abuse allegations
- Me Too movement
