= R. Kelly sexual abuse cases =

1990s–2010s sex crimes

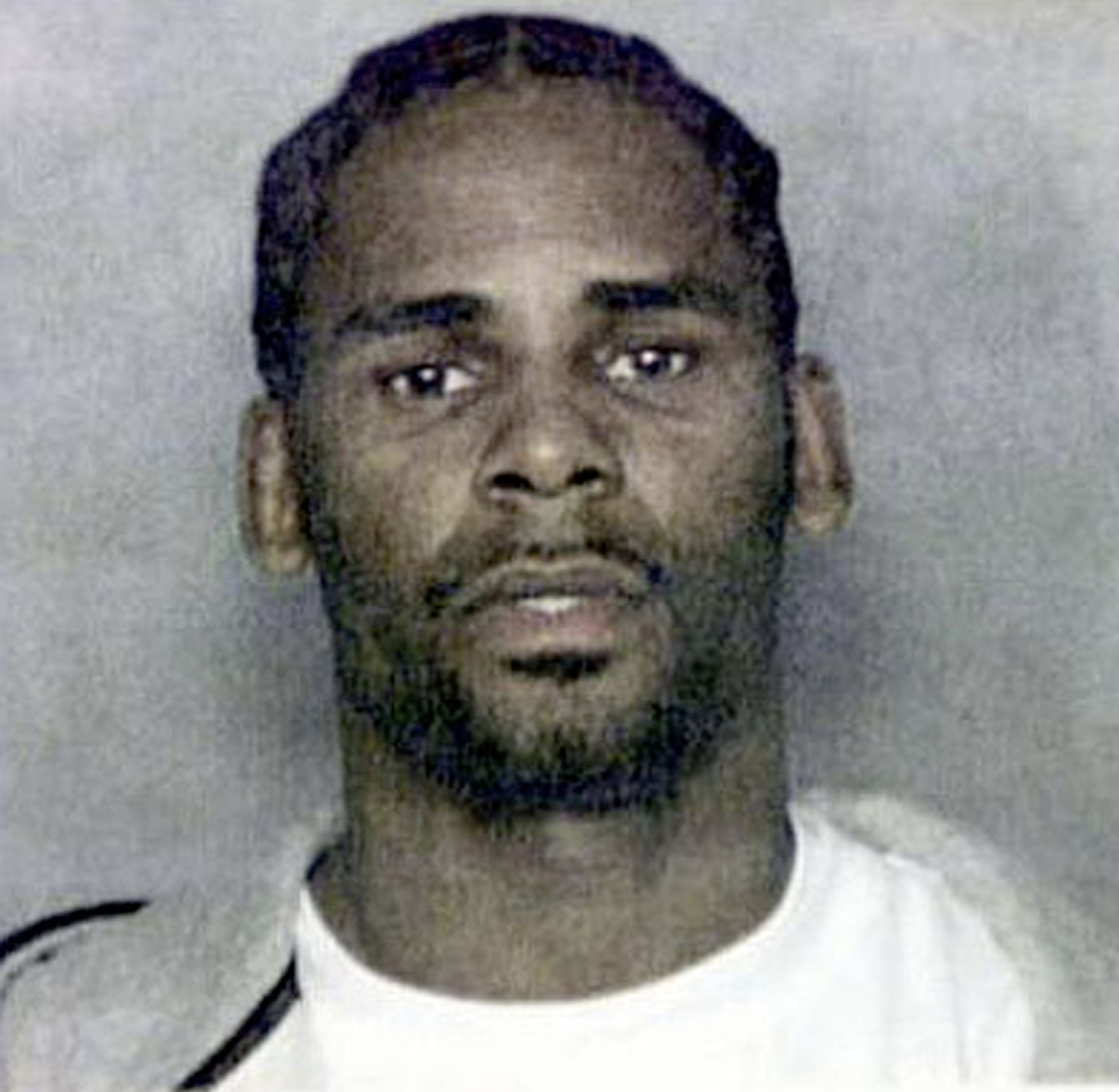
R. Kelly after his 2003 arrest

American R&B singer R. Kelly has faced repeated accusations of sexual abuse for incidents dating from 1991 to 2018 and has been the subject of a long-term investigation by the Chicago Sun-Times since August 2000. He has been tried in multiple civil suits and criminal trials, starting in 1996 and culminating in a 2021 conviction for violations of the Mann Act and Racketeer Influenced and Corrupt Organizations Act, and a 2022 conviction for production of child pornography. Defenders of Kelly maintained that he was merely a "playboy" and a "sex symbol". Judge Ann Donnelly, who presided over Kelly's 2021 trial, summarized Kelly's actions as having "[used] his fame and organization to lure young people into abusive sexual relationships—a racketeering enterprise that the government alleged spanned about 25 years."

Following leaked video recordings, Kelly was prosecuted on child pornography charges in 2002, leading to a controversial trial that ended with his acquittal in 2008 on all charges. In 2018, Kelly released a response track titled "I Admit", in which he refuted claims of sexual abuse, cult leading and pedophilia. The 2019 documentary Surviving R. Kelly reexamined Kelly's sexual misconduct with minors, prompting RCA Records to terminate his contract. Renewed interest in the allegations resulted in additional investigations by law enforcement beginning in 2019, which led to multiple convictions and Kelly's arrest. In 2021 and 2022, he was convicted on multiple charges involving child sexual abuse, and is currently serving a 31-year combined sentence at FCI Butner Medium I.

== Early sexual abuse accusations (1990s–2000s) ==
=== Illegal marriage (1994) ===
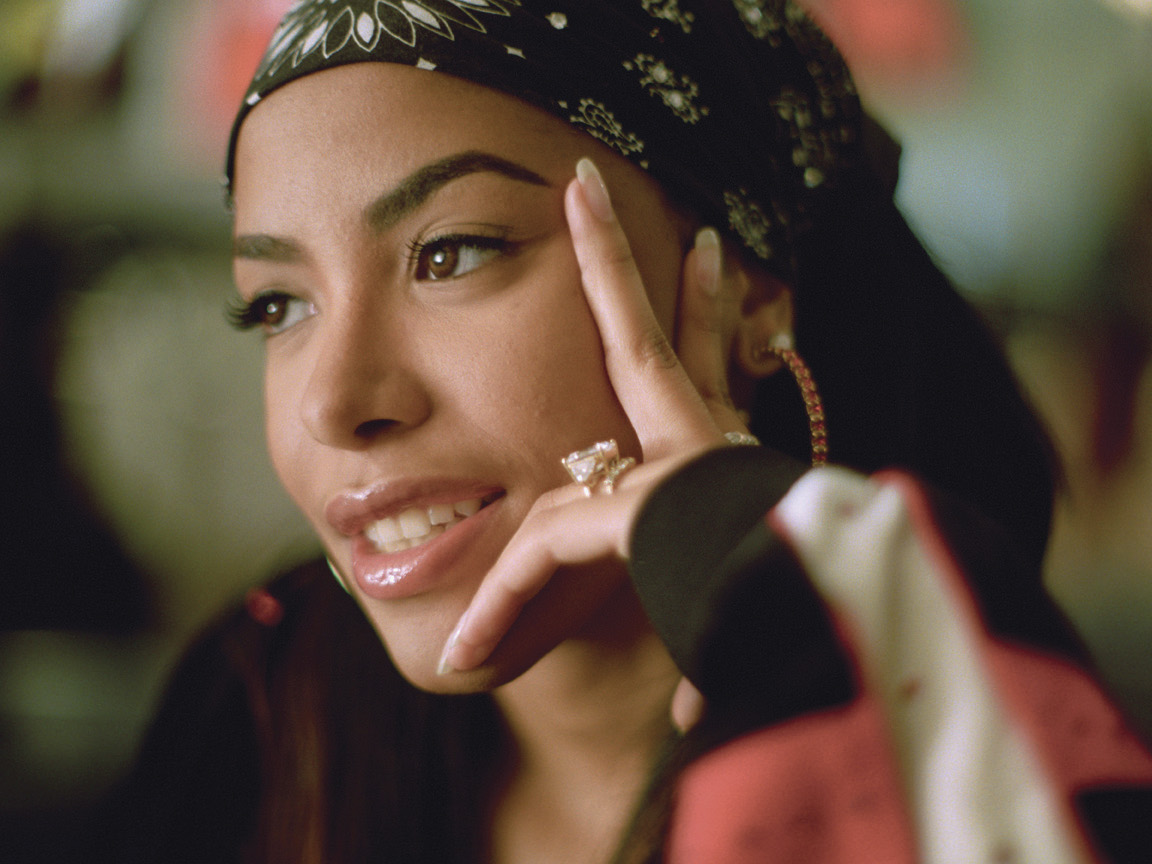
Aaliyah in 2000

In 1991, Barry Hankerson introduced his niece Aaliyah to Kelly when she was 12 years old. "I saw her as a star the minute I heard her sing and dance," Kelly said. A witness later testified that Kelly had sexually abused Aaliyah starting when she was "13 or 14 years old." Kelly wrote and produced Aaliyah's debut album, Age Ain't Nothing but a Number, which was released in May 1994.

On August 31, 1994, Kelly, then 27, married Aaliyah, then 15, in a secret ceremony at Sheraton Gateway Suites in Rosemont, Illinois. Reportedly, Kelly married Aaliyah after he found out she was pregnant. Their marriage certificate was published in the Dec. 1994 / Jan. 1995 issue of Vibe magazine. Their marriage was annulled in February 1995 at the behest of Aaliyah's family by a Michigan judge. In May 1997, Aaliyah filed a lawsuit in Cook County to have the marriage record expunged, stating that she was underage at the time of marriage, had lied by signing the marriage certificate as an 18-year-old, and that she could not legally enter into marriage without parental consent.

Kelly and Aaliyah (who died in 2001) both denied that their relationship had moved beyond friendship. In 2016, Kelly told GQ magazine: "Well, because of Aaliyah's passing ... I will never have that conversation with anyone. Out of respect for Aaliyah, and her mother and father who has asked me not to personally. But I can tell you I loved her, I can tell you she loved me, we was very close. We were, you know, best best best best friends."

In 2019, federal prosecutors in New York State charged Kelly with bribery related to the 1994 purchase of a fake identification card for Aaliyah to obtain a marriage license. Kelly's former tour manager, Demetrius Smith, testified that he facilitated the wedding by obtaining falsified identification for Aaliyah, which listed her as 18 years old. Kelly, through his lawyers, admitted in 2021 to having had "underage sexual contact" with Aaliyah.

=== Early lawsuits ===
A civil suit filed in 1996 by Tiffany Hawkins alleged that, starting in 1991 when she was aged 15, R. Kelly, aged 24, had sexual relations with her and encouraged her to entice underaged friends. Hawkins' allegations included attempts by Kelly to coerce her into engaging in group sex with her friends. In 1998, Kelly settled the lawsuit with Hawkins for $250,000. In December 2000, the Chicago Sun-Times first reported that police had made two investigations that Kelly was having sex with an underage female but had to drop the investigations due to a lack of cooperation by the accusers.

=== Exposure of child sexual abuse material and indictment (2002) ===
On February 3, 2002, a video began circulating allegedly depicting Kelly's sexual abuse of a girl known to be underage. The abuse included Kelly, then 35, urinating on her. The video was released by an anonymous source and sent to the Chicago Sun-Times. The publisher broke the story on February 8, 2002, the same day Kelly performed at the opening ceremony of the 2002 Winter Olympics. Kelly has said in interviews that he was not the man in the video. In June 2002, Kelly was indicted in Chicago on 21 counts of child pornography. That same month on June 5, 2002, Kelly was arrested by the Miami Police Department on a Chicago arrest warrant at his Florida vacation home. He was released after one night in jail, the following day after posting bail of $750,000.

While investigating the photographs reported in the Chicago Sun-Times, Polk County Sheriff's Office searched Kelly's residence in Davenport, Florida. During the search, officers recovered 12 images of an allegedly underage girl on a digital camera – wrapped in a towel in a duffel bag – which allegedly depicted Kelly "involved in sexual conduct with the female minor". According to the Chicago Sun-Times, the girl in the images obtained from Kelly's Florida home also appears in the videotape, resulting in the original indictment in Chicago.

Police investigators from Polk County and Miami-Dade County arrested Kelly on January 22, 2003, at Miami's Wyndham Grand Bay Hotel for 12 counts of possession of child pornography. Kelly, 36, posted bail of $12,000 bond and was released three hours later from Miami-Dade county jail. In March 2004, when he was 37, these charges were dropped due to a lack of probable cause for the search warrants.

The alleged victim refused to testify at the trial, and a Chicago jury found Kelly not guilty on all 14 counts of child pornography in June 2008. He was 41 years old at the time. Kelly's defense lawyer Ed Genson later questioned the acquittal and Kelly's public proclamations of innocence.

=== Allegations of child molestation (2009) ===
In a divorce court filing unsealed in 2020, Kelly's ex-wife Andrea Lee claimed Kelly was accused of molesting a preteen girl in 2009. In October 2024, it was revealed that the girl in question was Buku Abi, the elder daughter of Andrea and R. Kelly.

== Second series of accusations (2010s–present) ==
=== Huffington Post Live interview (2015) ===
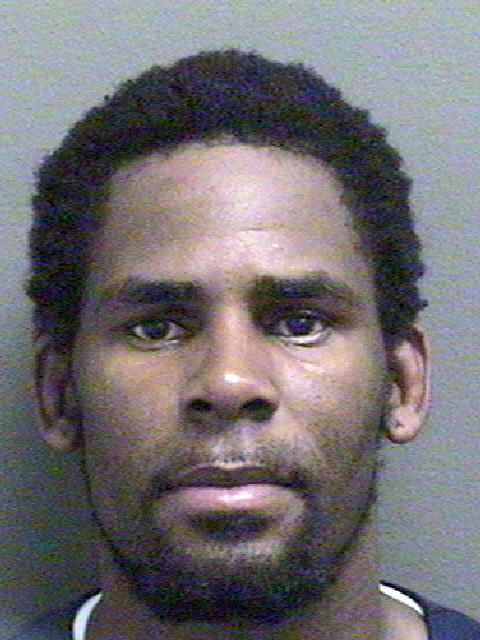
R. Kelly's 2002 mugshot

In December 2015, aged 48, Kelly appeared on Huffington Post Live in an interview with journalist Caroline Modarressy-Tehrani. The interview was conducted so that he could promote the release of his thirteenth solo album, The Buffet.

During the interview, Modarressy-Tehrani quizzed Kelly about the sexual abuse allegations being leveled against him and wanted to gauge his reaction. This resulted in Kelly repeatedly refusing to answer and walking out of the interview.

Following Kelly's New York conviction in late September 2021, Modarressy-Tehrani tweeted: "Now, with this verdict, hopefully, his survivors get some peace and feel this justice."

=== Alleged sex cult (2010s) ===
Jim DeRogatis reported for BuzzFeed News on July 17, 2017, that Kelly, then 50, was accused by three sets of parents of holding their daughters in an "abusive cult". Kelly and the alleged victims denied the allegations.

In March 2018, the BBC World Service aired the documentary R. Kelly: Sex, Girls and Videotapes, presented by reporter Ben Zand, which explored allegations from 2017. The title references the film Sex, Lies, and Videotape, produced by Harvey Weinstein, whose own sexual assault charges emerged around the same time as those against Kelly. This was followed up in May with the BBC Three documentary R Kelly: The Sex Scandal Continues, which included interviews with the Savage family.

Kelly, then 51, was again accused of misconduct on April 17, 2018, by a former partner of his who claimed that Kelly "intentionally" infected her with a sexually transmitted infection. A representative for Kelly stated that he "categorically denies all claims and allegations".

In a January 2019 BBC News article, a woman named Asante McGee whom Kelly had met in 2014 and taken to live with him some months later, said that she lived with not only Kelly but also other women. She said: "He controlled every aspect of my life, while I lived with him." McGee later moved out on her own accord.

==== Boycott and industry response ====
In May 2018, the Women of Color branch of the Time's Up movement called for a boycott of Kelly's music and performances over the many allegations against him. The boycott was accompanied by a social media campaign called Mute R. Kelly. In response, his management said that Kelly supports the movement in principle, but targeting him was "the attempted lynching of a black man who has made extraordinary contributions to our culture".

Music streaming service Spotify announced on May 10, 2018, that it was going to stop promoting or recommending music by Kelly, XXXTentacion and Tay-K, stating, "We don't censor content because of an artist's or creator's behavior, but we want our editorial decisions—what we choose to program—to reflect our values." Two days later, Apple Music and Pandora also announced that they would cease to feature or promote Kelly's music. With the launch of its "Hate Content and Hateful Conduct" policy, Spotify was criticized by members of the music industry with concerns the decision would create a "slippery slope" of muting artists accused of criminal activity. Spotify reversed this decision, following a social media backlash including that of Kendrick Lamar and his former record label, Top Dawg Entertainment, which both threatened to remove their respective individual discography and label musical catalog from the streaming service. XXXTentacion was later recovered on the platform's playlists and recommendations, but Kelly and Tay-K remained removed.

On July 23, 2018, Kelly released a response track titled "I Admit" via SoundCloud. On "I Admit", he disputes claims of sexual abuse, cult leading and pedophilia. However, he claims to have had casual sex with "both young and old ladies". Kelly also scrutinizes the Mute R. Kelly campaign, Jim DeRogatis, Time's Up and others for attempting to blackball him. In reference to his 1994 marriage to Aaliyah, he says it was "love." He remains silent on his 2002 indictment for producing child sexual abuse material, maintaining his lawyer suggested that he says "noth". He responds to Mute R. Kelly, stating "only God can mute me" and supports Bill Cosby who was convicted of similar cases. Kelly also invites Chicago to use his image as inspiration for city youth. The chorus repeats "I admit it, I did it", despite the fact that Kelly never expressed admission to any allegations levied against him. The song was criticized on social media and dubbed as an act of trolling.

In early January 2019, Kelly was dropped from RCA Records following the airing of Surviving R. Kelly, which detailed numerous sexual assault allegations against the singer for decades. Several musicians who collaborated with Kelly expressed regret for working with him, including Celine Dion ("I'm Your Angel"), Nick Cannon ("Gigolo"), The Pussycat Dolls ("Out of This Club"), Chance the Rapper ("Somewhere in Paradise"), Ciara (the "Go & Get Your Tickets" remix to her 2006 single, "Promise"), Lady Gaga ("Do What U Want"), and Jennifer Hudson ("It's Your World"). Some went as far as having streaming services remove their songs that featured his vocals or credited him for songwriting or production.

As of October 2021, when Kelly was 54, following his New York conviction, Kelly's YouTube channels, RKellyTV and RKellyVevo, were terminated, but his catalog remained available on YouTube Music.

=== Alleged music industry complicity ===
In May 2018, The Washington Post reporter Geoff Edgers wrote "The Star Treatment", a lengthy article alleging music industry executives' willful blindness to Kelly's sexually abusive behavior toward underage girls. Edgers reported that as early as 1994, Kelly's tour manager urged Jive Records founder Clive Calder to tell Kelly he would not release the singer's records if he continued to have "incidents" with young women and minors after every concert he gave. Calder told the Post that he regretted not having done more then, saying "Clearly, we missed something."

Former Jive president Barry Weiss told the newspaper that during twenty years with the label he never concerned himself with Kelly's private life and was unaware of two lawsuits filed against Kelly and the label by young women alleging sexual misconduct while they were minors. Jive Records had, in fact, successfully argued it was not liable. Larry Khan, another Jive executive who worked closely with the singer even after viewing the sex tape, likewise implied it was not the label's responsibility, and pointed to Chuck Berry and Jerry Lee Lewis as musicians whose labels continued to release and promote their records despite public awareness that they were involved with underage girls.

According to the Post, executives at Epic Records also took a similarly relaxed attitude towards allegations of Kelly's sexual misconduct. In 2002, after Kelly signed with the label, executive David McPherson allegedly avoided viewing a copy of a tape purportedly showing the singer having sex with an underage girl; he simultaneously warned Kelly's assistant that if it turned out to be Kelly on that tape, the label would drop him. McPherson did not respond to the Post's requests for comment.

An intern with the label whose work suffered after she began a relationship with Kelly, ultimately costing her the position, settled with Epic for $250,000. Cathy Carroll, the executive she worked for, said she regularly rebuked the former subordinate for having an affair with a married man whenever the two met at social functions for years afterward, and the damage to the woman's reputation led her to abandon her career in the music industry. Carroll told the newspaper the woman was "starstruck ... A lot of times it's not really the men."

The Post article also suggested the labels were complicit in the sex cult allegations from the previous summer's BuzzFeed piece. Employees at the studios where Kelly recorded were required to sign non-disclosure agreements and not enter certain rooms, which they said they believed were where Kelly made the young women and underage girls stay while he worked. Despite the agreements, the newspaper obtained screenshots of text exchanges in which the young women and girls asked Kelly's assistants to let them out of the room to go to the bathroom or get food. The newspaper also published pictures taken after Kelly had concluded a six-week session at a Los Angeles studio, paid for by his former record label, RCA Records, showing a cup of urine sitting on a piano and urine stains on the wooden floor of another room.

== Surviving R. Kelly ==
In January 2019, Lifetime began airing a six-part documentary series titled Surviving R. Kelly detailing sexual abuse and misconduct allegations against Kelly. Writing for the Los Angeles Times, Loraine Ali observed that the series covered a range of in-depth interviews that "paint a picture of a predator whose behavior was consistently overlooked by the industry, his peers and the public while his spiritual hit was sung in churches and schools."

Within two weeks, Kelly launched a Facebook page where he sought to discredit the accusers who appeared in the docuseries. Facebook removed the page for violating their standards as it appeared to contain personal contact information for his accusers. The second season titled Surviving R. Kelly Part II: The Reckoning premiered on January 2, 2020. Between January 2–3, 2023, the third and final season of Surviving R. Kelly (subtitled The Final Chapter) aired. It was confirmed in a trailer uploaded to Lifetime's YouTube account on December 14, 2022.

Following the release of Surviving R. Kelly, Kelly was listed in Guinness World Records as the most searched-for male musician on Google in 2019. He ranked 8th overall on Google's list of the 10 most searched-for people for the year.

=== CBS This Morning interview with Gayle King (2019) ===
On March 6, 2019, Gayle King interviewed Kelly on CBS This Morning. Kelly, then 52, insisted on his innocence and blamed social media for the allegations. During the interview, Kelly had an emotional outburst where he stood up, pounded his chest, and yelled profanities. Asked by King about John Legend and Lady Gaga denouncing him, Kelly called them "not professional".

The CBS This Morning segment also included two women whose parents claimed were brainwashed captives of Kelly. They described themselves as "girlfriends" of Kelly, defending and declaring their love for him, while also denouncing their parents. Afterward, King would debrief with colleagues on the recording on the segment. She recalled that a condition for recording the segment with the "girlfriends" was that Kelly would not be in the room with them. Kelly had nevertheless stayed nearby during the recording and, according to King, Kelly would "cough really loudly" to remind the women of his presence.

== 2019 Cook County arrest and federal indictments ==
On February 22, 2019, the Cook County State's Attorney's Office in Illinois charged Kelly with 10 counts of aggravated criminal sexual abuse. The charges allege that from 1998 to 2010, Kelly sexually abused four people, three of whom were teen minors at the time, with evidence including a video provided by Michael Avenatti of an alleged new crime. After Kelly turned himself in the day the charges were announced, he was arrested by the Chicago Police Department and taken into custody.

The judge set bond at $1 million and ordered Kelly to have no contact with anyone under 18 or the alleged victim. Kelly pleaded not guilty to all charges, which he called lies. He was released on bail after three nights at Cook County Jail.

On January 30, 2023, the Cook County District Attorney's office announced that several Illinois-specific charges against Kelly had been dropped, due to "him already being served justice in extensive federal sentences", preventing him from facing more prison time for state-related charges.

=== Federal indictments and pretrial detention (2019–2023) ===
The first grand jury indictment from the Eastern District of New York was handed down on June 20, 2019. On July 11, 2019, Kelly was arrested on federal charges alleging sex crimes and obstruction of justice by U.S. Homeland Security investigators and NYPD detectives in Chicago. A day later, following his re-arrest, federal prosecutors from New York and Chicago indicted Kelly on 18 charges, including child sexual exploitation, child pornography production, sex trafficking, kidnapping, forced labor, racketeering, and obstruction of justice.

Following his re-arrest on the first superseding indictment, the United States Attorney for the Eastern District of New York filed a letter in support of a permanent order of detention that previewed its case against Kelly, concluding that "preponderance of the evidence that the defendant's release poses both a risk of flight and a risk of obstruction of justice". Kelly's first arraignment on the Eastern District case took place before a United States Magistrate Judge Steven Tiscione on August 2, 2019, where he pleaded not guilty. Judge Tiscione denied bail, on grounds of both dangerousness and flight risk.

Kelly's lawyers requested and were denied a pre-trial release in October 2019. His lawyers tried again to secure pre-trial release in 2020, citing the COVID-19 pandemic; the request was denied.

Superseding indictments were filed in Chicago on February 13, 2020, and in New York on March 13, 2020, raising the total number of charges to 22. Kelly, then 53, was incarcerated at Metropolitan Correctional Center, Chicago from July 11, 2019, to June 23, 2021, when he was transferred to Metropolitan Detention Center, Brooklyn at the age of 54.

=== Hennepin County indictment (2019) ===
On August 5, 2019, the State's Attorney's Office in Hennepin County, Minnesota charged Kelly with soliciting a minor and prostitution. Prosecutors alleged that in July 2001, following a concert in Minneapolis, Kelly had invited a girl up to his hotel room and paid her $200 to remove her clothing and dance with him. The charges were however dropped on May 16, 2023, citing Kelly's federal convictions.

=== Trial in the Eastern District of New York (2021) ===
The United States District Court for the Eastern District of New York was the first federal court to indict Kelly; at the time, it was the only jurisdiction to take Kelly to trial following the charges filed in the wake of Surviving R. Kelly. Investigations continued with Kelly indicted, jailed and awaiting trial. Before trial, prosecutors previewed a growing body of evidence including evidence of bribes and recordings of threats. It was a month before trial that prosecutors first accused Kelly of abusing a male victim, an underaged boy he met at McDonald's, as pattern evidence in his trial.

=== Jury trial ===
With Judge Ann Donnelly presiding, voir dire in United States v. Robert Sylvester Kelly was held on August 9, 2021. The same day, Kelly's lawyers filed a last-second motion to dismiss charges related to his transmission of genital herpes to several of his victims; that Kelly knew of his infection and non-disclosure to his sexual partners is a criminal act under the Public Health Law of New York and was presented as a predicate act for the charge of racketeering as well as the violations of the Mann Act. Judge Donnelly denied the motion, releasing a written decision after the trial.

The federal jury trial began on August 18, 2021, with opening statements by prosecution and defense lawyers. The first witness called was Jerhonda Pace, one of the subjects of Surviving R. Kelly whose identity is widely known. She was the first of any of Kelly's accusers to have ever testified against him in court. Pace testified that Kelly's abuse included slapping, choking, and raping her. On cross-examination, Pace was asked about signing a statement that she had deceived Kelly about her age and replied that it was a condition of a settlement.

In all, eleven witnesses at Kelly's trial accused him of abuse either sexual or physical, with some accusing him of both. Two accusers were men alleging Kelly had sexually abused them at ages 16 and 17; one ("Louis") had recruited the other ("Alex") and testified as a cooperating witness. In addition, eight members of Kelly's staff testified, corroborating details of Kelly's modus operandi.

Toward the end of the testimony on September 15, 2021, a video corroborating accusers' accounts of abuse was shown to the jury, but not the public or media. The videos were alluded to in later closing arguments as depicting Kelly delivering a painful spanking to one accuser, and a lengthy recording in which Kelly demanded acts of coprophagia and urophagia to humiliate another accuser. As the jury deliberated, the press was allowed to listen to the audio portions to fulfill obligations of access to evidence; accounts confirmed that Kelly and his victim's voices are heard narrating the graphic acts of abuse of the latter recording. Months after the verdict, prosecutors disclosed that, following Kelly's orders, "[a]t least three women made videos of themselves eating feces and rubbing it over their bodies."

==== Guilty verdicts ====
Jacquelyn M. Kasulis, Acting United States Attorney for the Eastern District of New York, and Peter C. Fitzhugh, Special Agent-in-Charge, Homeland Security Investigations, New York (HSI), announced the guilty verdict on September 27, 2021

After a six-week trial including two days of deliberations, on September 27, 2021, the jury returned a verdict of guilty on all nine counts of the verdict sheet. They include:

- One count of Racketeering (18 U.S.C. § 1962(c)).
- Eight Mann Act violations:
  - Three counts of transportation across state lines for illegal sexual activity (18 U.S.C. § 2421(a))
  - Four counts coercion and enticement (18 U.S.C. § 2422(a))
  - One count of transportation of a minor (18 U.S.C. § 2423(a)).

As described in a release by the United States Attorney for the Eastern District of New York, the racketeering charge against Kelly specified the following predicate acts:

Racketeering Act One – Bribery

Kelly bribed a state employee to create an identification card for Jane Doe #1, then 15 years old, so that Kelly could marry Jane Doe #1 because he believed she was pregnant and therefore the marriage could keep him out of jail.

Racketeering Acts Two, Seven and Ten – Sexual Exploitation of a Child – Jane Doe #2, Jane Doe #4 and Jane Doe #5

Kelly coerced Jane Doe #2, Jane Doe #4 and Jane Doe #5 to engage in sexually explicit conduct for the purpose of producing video recordings. Over the course of decades, he made these recordings, and other recordings of sexually explicit conduct, using VHS video cameras, Canon camcorders, iPhones and iPads.

Racketeering Acts Six, Eleven and Thirteen – Forced Labor – Jane Doe #4, Jane Doe #5 and Jane Doe #6

Kelly used the threat of physical harm and physical restraint to ensure that his victims, including Jane Doe #4, Jane Doe #5 and Jane Doe #6, performed sexually at his command. As to Jane Doe #4, he slapped her, choked her and spat on her, before demanding she give him oral sex. As to Jane Doe #5, over a period of years, he spanked her, viciously assaulted her, confined her for periods of days and otherwise manipulated her, to ensure that she would perform for him sexually, including with other women and a man. As to Jane Doe #6, he forced her to give him oral sex. When he did that, there was a gun within Kelly's reach.

Racketeering Acts Five and Nine – Mann Act Violations – Jane Doe #4 and Jane Doe #5

Between May 2009 and January 2010, Kelly regularly spoke with Jane Doe #4 over the telephone to arrange for Jane Doe #4 to come to his residence in Olympia Fields for the purpose of illegal sexual activity, which was illegal because Jane Doe #4 was too young to consent to sex in Illinois. Similarly, between September 2015 and October 2015, Kelly transported Jane Doe #5, who was then 17 years old, from New York City to Oakland, California for the purpose of illegal sexual activity, as she was too young to consent to sex in California.

Racketeering Acts Eight, Thirteen and Fourteen – Mann Act Violations – Jane Doe #5 and Jane Doe #6

In April 2015, Kelly arranged for Jane Doe #5 to fly from her home in Orlando, Florida, to Los Angeles, California, for the purpose of illegal sexual activity, which was illegal because Kelly knew he had an incurable sexually transmitted disease ("STD") and did not inform Jane Doe #5 about the STD prior to engaging in sexual intercourse with her. In May of 2017 and again in February of 2018, Kelly arranged for Jane Doe #6 to fly from her home in San Antonio, Texas, to La Guardia Airport in Queens, New York, for the purpose of illegal sexual activity, which again was illegal because Kelly failed to disclose that he had an incurable STD and obtain Jane Doe #6's consent to engage in sexual intercourse under those circumstances.

— United States Department of Justice, United States Attorney for the Eastern District of New York, "R. Kelly" Convicted of All Counts by a Federal Jury in Brooklyn

==== Post-verdict reaction ====
United States District Judge Ann Donnelly ordered Kelly to be kept in custody at the Metropolitan Detention Center, Brooklyn to await sentencing. Kelly faced a sentencing range of 10 years to life in prison, and on June 29, 2022, aged 55, he was sentenced to spend 30 years behind bars. After the jury delivered their verdict, women's rights attorney Gloria Allred, who represented several victims, stated that Kelly was the worst sexual predator she had pursued in her 47-year career of practicing law.

Writing for The New Yorker, longtime Kelly critic Jim DeRogatis asked, "How many more victims are there who we don't know about? This case involved twenty women and two men, but there are likely many more." DeRogatis noted that before the trial, prosecutors had told the judge they would call Susan E. Loggans, a Chicago attorney who had negotiated settlements on behalf of several accusers who testified in the criminal case, but she was never called to testify.

On October 29, 2021, Kelly retained the services of Jennifer Bonjean, who has helped overturn rape convictions for Bill Cosby and a victim of Jon Burge. Kelly fired his other lawyers in January 2022. In April 2023, aged 56, Kelly appealed the verdict for this case.

==== Sentencing ====
U.S. Attorney Breon Peace and Executive Associate Director Steve Francis of Homeland Security Investigations (HSI) deliver remarks after the sentencing of R. Kelly to 30 years in prison.

The sentencing process in the Eastern District of New York began with the presentation of the sealed Presentence Report (PSR) by the Office of Probation to the court on April 5, 2022. Kelly's defense lawyer Jennifer Bonjean lodged several objections to the report's description of Kelly's conduct.

The opposing sides differed sharply in assessments of the applicable sentence. Bonjean filed a defense sentencing memorandum arguing that the applicable sentence according to United States Federal Sentencing Guidelines would be 168 to 210 months imprisonment and that Kelly should receive less prison time. Arguing for leniency, Bonjean also wrote that a minor victim of Kelly was "a sophisticated 16-year-old". In its sentencing memorandum, prosecutors supported the application of several enhancements under Sentencing Guidelines, adding up to a sentence of 25 years-to-life imprisonment, and that "[g]iven the need for specific deterrence and incapacitation, the government respectfully submits that a shorter sentence would be insufficient to adequately protect the public."

Kelly's defense submitted several exhibits attesting to mitigating factors in a supplement to the sentencing memorandum. The exhibits were filed under seal. Following an unsealing and redaction process, the court revealed that factors Kelly's defense cited were his history of adverse childhood experiences, including sexual abuse by his sister and his illiteracy. Defense experts diagnosed Kelly with hypersexuality.

In the first half of Kelly's sentencing on June 29, 2022, seven women were permitted to address the court with their victim impact statements. According to Rolling Stone journalists, Kelly refused to look at them. Judge Donnelly ended the day reportedly sentencing Kelly to 30 years imprisonment, admonishing his criminality as "calculated and carefully planned and regularly executed for almost 25 years".

In Donnelly's written judgment, the sentence was apportioned as follows: 30 years for the top charge of racketeering; 20 years for three acts of Mann Act coercion and enticement; 20 years for one violation of the Mann Act transportation of a minor; and 10 years for three counts of Mann Act transportation across state lines for illegal sexual activity. These terms would be served concurrently. Donnelly also ordered Kelly to serve 5 years of supervised release following the completion of the sentence, with conditions typical for sex offenders.

In addition to prison time, Judge Donnelly levied a $100,000 fine plus a statutory $40,000 penalty under the Justice for Victims of Trafficking Act of 2015. Contesting the assessments, attorney Jennifer Bonjean claimed that Kelly has lost his income and is indigent. Prosecutors countered that Kelly has secretly sold rights to his composition and lyrics royalties for $5 million. On September 28, 2022, Kelly was ordered to pay restitution of $300,000 to one of his victims, with potential for tens of thousands of dollars more to pay for another victim.

Bonjean said Kelly was "devastated" by his sentence and would appeal. Following his sentencing, the Federal Bureau of Prisons placed Kelly under suicide watch. His legal team argued that the measures were unnecessary, punitive, and cruel because he was never suicidal nor had he ever thought about suicide. However, prosecutors defended the placement, claiming it was for his safety. On July 4, 2022, authorities removed Kelly from suicide watch.

On July 13, 2022, Kelly transferred from Metropolitan Detention Center, Brooklyn to Metropolitan Correctional Center, Chicago in anticipation of a trial in the United States District Court for the Northern District of Illinois.

On February 12, 2025 the verdict and sentence in this case was upheld by the 2nd Circuit Court of Appeals. Attorney Bonjean released a statement on Kelly's behalf asserting that the Supreme Court would agree to hear an appeal of this "unprecedented" ruling because the charged conduct was "absurdly remote" from the intent of the statute. On June 23, 2025, when he was 58, the Supreme Court rejected Kelly's appeal, leaving his entire combined sentence intact.

== Trial in the Northern District of Illinois (2022) ==
Parallel to the Eastern District of New York prosecution, the United States District Court for the Northern District of Illinois in Chicago indicted Kelly alongside two alleged co-conspirators: his manager Derrel McDavid and his personal assistant Milton "June" Brown. All pled "not guilty". The case was tried before Judge Harry Leinenweber, and commenced on August 17, 2022.

=== Allegations ===
The final superseding indictment of Kelly and his co-conspirators charged him with the following:

- Counts One through Four: Production of child pornography (18 U.S.C. § 2251(a)) for four videos filmed with "Minor 1" between 1998 and 1999.
- Count Five: Conspiracy to defraud the United States (18 U.S.C. § 371) for various illegal acts from 2001 until 2015 to cover up offenses in the 2002 Cook County case.
- Counts Six through Eight: Receipt of child pornography (18 USC § 2252A(a)(2) and § 2252A(b)(1)) conspiracies to obtain videos of child sexual abuse to conceal them.
- Counts Nine through Thirteen: Child sex trafficking through coercion and enticement (18 U.S.C. § 2422(b)) of five unnamed victims (listed as Minors 1, 3, 4, 5, 6), for acts committed in the time span of 1996 through 2001.

=== Trial process ===
Jury selection began on August 15, 2022. Over 100 potential jurors were interviewed over two days. The regular jury of twelve persons consisted of four white women, four black women, two white men, and two black men.

On the first day of testimony, the jury heard from a witness who was allegedly depicted in the child sexual abuse material revealed in 2002. The court allowed the witness, age 37 at the time of the trial, to testify under the pseudonym "Jane". She testified that Kelly groomed her for sexual abuse starting when she was 13 years old, presenting himself as a benevolent "godfather". Jane also told the jury that Kelly induced her to recruit other girls for abuse. On Kelly's efforts to thwart law enforcement, Jane told the court that he sent her to travel to the Bahamas and Cancun to keep her away from law enforcement, and coaxed her to lie to a grand jury.

Also testifying was an individual who purchased a home previously owned by Kelly. The interior was alleged to match the 2002 video. The individual noted that after his purchase, he discovered a bedroom that contained a camera disguised as a smoke detector and a secured door requiring a button to be pressed to leave.

==== Verdict and sentencing ====
On September 14, the jury found Kelly guilty on three of thirteen charges of production of child pornography and three charges of enticing a child, but acquitted him and his alleged co-conspirators of trial fixing related to his 2008 state child pornography trial.

Stating a case for leniency in a sentencing memorandum, Kelly's attorneys made several technical arguments about the Chicago federal case but admitted to repeated sexual encounters with the testifying victims when they were underage. Arguing for mitigation, the memorandum included a passage written by expert witness Dr. Renée Sorrentino arguing that Kelly is not a pedophile:

I considered the diagnosis of Pedophilia given Mr. Kelly's alleged history of sexual contact with minors. The diagnosis of Pedophilia is used to refer to individuals who experience recurrent, intense, sexually arousing fantasies or sexual urges involving sexual activity with prepubescent child or children (generally age 13 years or younger). I rejected the diagnosis because Mr. Kelly does not report a history of sexual arousal to prepubescent individual and his sexual behavior has never involved prepubescent individuals.

Sorrentino co-authored a paper arguing for a distinction between pedophilia and ephebophilia, and using the term "minor-attracted person". The paper also cited research by the organization Virtuous Pedophiles. Use of the term in a criminal justice context is controversial. In their sentencing memorandum, prosecutors requested a 300-month prison sentence to be served consecutively to the sentence from the Eastern District of New York, effectively a life imprisonment. Arguing that Kelly's criminal conduct in Illinois was separate from the conduct of his previous conviction in New York and severe, the memorandum stated in its opening paragraph:

Robert Kelly is a serial sexual predator who, over the course of many years, specifically targeted young girls and went to great lengths to conceal his abuse of Jane and other minor victims. To this day, and even following the jury verdict against him, Kelly refuses to accept responsibility for his crimes. To the contrary, Kelly brazenly blames his victims and argues that his abuse of 14, 15, and 16-year-old girls was justified because some of his victims as minors "wanted to pursue a romantic and sexual connection" with him and others remained in contact with him as adults. At the age of 56 years old, Kelly's lack of remorse and failure to grasp the gravity of his criminal conduct against children demonstrates that he poses a serious danger to society. Kelly goes so far as to insinuate that he—and not the young girls he abused—is the victim, because the federal government elected to prosecute him for egregious conduct that occurred throughout the United States for over 20 years.

Kelly was sentenced in Chicago federal court on February 23, 2023. Judge Harry Leinenweber sentenced Kelly to 20 years: 19 concurrent to the 30-year sentence from New York and 1 year consecutively, effectively bringing his sentence to 31 years.

On April 24, 2023, Kelly was transferred from the Metropolitan Correctional Center, Chicago to the Federal Correctional Complex, Butner in Butner, North Carolina.

On April 26, 2024, the Seventh Circuit Court of Appeals rejected Kelly's appeal of the statute of limitations ruling and sentence imposed for his Chicago conviction. On October 7, 2024, when Kelly was 57, the Supreme Court refused to hear any further appeal.

In July 2026, Kelly formally appealed to president Donald Trump for a commutation of his prison sentence.

== See also ==
- 1995 Okinawa rape incident
- Sean Combs sexual misconduct allegations
