= Andrea Kelly (disambiguation) =

Andrea Kelly is an American dancer and actress. It may also refer to:

- Andrea Kelly (curler) (born 1985), a Canadian curler previously known as Andrea Crawford
- Andrea Kelly Kilfeather, a member of Irish girl group Bellefire
