= Soulacoaster =

2012 R. Kelly autobiography

Soulacoaster: The Diary Of Me
- Author: Robert Kelly (with David Ritz)
- Language: English
- Genre: Autobiography
- Publisher: SmileyBooks (US and worldwide)
- Publication date: June 28, 2012
- Publication place: United States
- Media type: Print (hardback & paperback)
- Pages: 392
- ISBN: 978-1401928353
- OCLC: 155836592

Soulacoaster: The Diary of Me is an autobiography by American R&B artist R. Kelly, co-written with David Ritz. The book was released on June 28, 2012. R. Kelly dedicated this book to his mother, who died in the early 1990s, and his high school music teacher, Lena McLin. Kelly shares his life story through episodic tales and exclusive colour photographs. The book is divided into three segments (Act 1 to Act 3).

== Synopsis ==
The book chronicles the journey of the singer R. Kelly from poverty to fame. His life begins in a rough neighborhood, being molested as a child by a woman, street performing by the Chicago "L" tracks, and struggling to make it and provide money to his single mother for rent and comfort. Ultimately, he becomes a rich and successful musician.

== See also ==
- "I Admit"
- Trapped in the Closet: The Book
