= Bellissima Opera =

Opera company in Illinois, United States

Bellissima Opera is an Oak Park, Illinois based initiative of the not-for-profit organization Working In Concert. Co-founder Christine Steyer serves as Bellissima Opera's current artistic director.

== History ==
It was founded in 2006 by opera singers Christine Steyer, Paul Geiger and Franco Martorana as Bellissima Opera Productions. The organization changed to Bellissima Opera LLC in 2009 and was incorporated as the non-profit Bellissima Opera in 2010. Over that time the company has given dozens of concerts and produced and performed in abridged versions of La Traviata and Madame Butterfly.

In 2008 the company, in partnership with Sounds True, recorded a CD of sacred music entitled Caroline Myss' "Voices of the Sacred". In 2014, it produced a concert called "The Music of the Universe" that combined voice, violin, Hawaiian dance and images, and featured a new vocal work for soprano by David Shenton set to a poem by Charlie Rossiter.

In 2019, Bellissima Opera became a founding initiative of the newly formed not-for-profit organization Working In Concert.

== Artists ==
The founders of Bellissima Opera are often the initiative's core performers. Bellissima Opera has also featured singers Partick Blackwell, Dominique Frigo, Ryan de Ryke, Marta Kasten and pianists Eugenia Chang, Anatoliy Torchinskiy, Jeff Panko and Marta Johnson. Others include violinist Chris Nemeth, dancers Fujima Shunojo, Fujima Yoshinojo and June Tanoue, artist David Robbins and directors Carl Ratner and Beaumont Glass. The company has also commissioned arrangements and new works from Ed Zelnis, Stuart Leitch, Daniel Vines and David Shenton.

== Bellissima Opera Outreach ==
In 2009, the founders created Bellissima Opera Outreach which has since presented age-appropriate classical vocal concerts for 23,000 youth ages pre-K to 12 in three states. The presentations are given directly in students classrooms and are designed to introduce the children to a variety of vocal music produced without the need for amplification.

== Tales of Transcendence Series ==
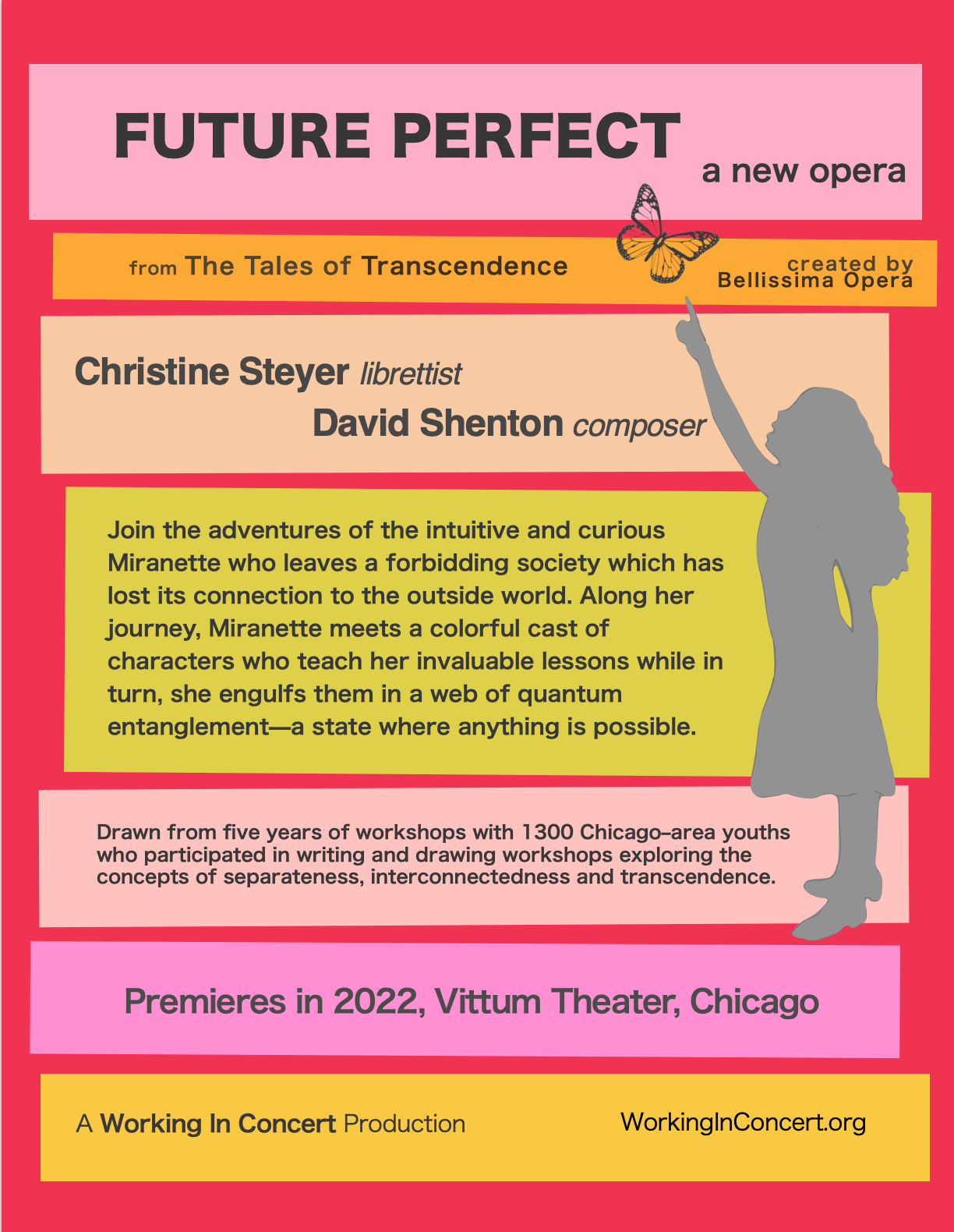
Original Poster for Future Perfect Opera

Bellissima Opera is currently creating the Tales of Transcendence series, a limited series of operas that examine individuals and groups who have transcended the human divide.

These currently include:

1. 2021: On Call: COVID-19, an opera which tells story of health care workers battling the COVID-19 pandemic. The opera featured a national cast which represented six international healthcare workers. The cast included: Emanuel-Cristian Caraman, tenor (South Bend, IN), Gwendolyn Brown, contralto (Nashville, TN), Russell Hoke, baritone (Elgin, IL), Jeong Eun Joo, soprano (Chicago, IL), Carl Ratner, baritone (Kalamazoo, MI), Christine Steyer, soprano (Oak Park, IL), and David Shenton, piano (Queens, NY). The opera also featured an international chorus of 30 virtual singers. This opera was also performed by a student cast from Western Michigan University.
2. 2022: Future Perfect, a full-length opera which tells the story of Miranette, a girl who leaves a forbidden society that has lost its connection to the outside world.
3. TBA: Outside The Ring, is based on the friendship between the German boxer Max Schmeling and the American boxer Joe Louis.
4. TBA: Reconciliation, examines Restorative Justice in the modern world and its impact on communities who are seeking measures of healing and restoration over past hurts.

== Performances by year ==
2006:
La Traviata by Giuseppe Verdi, the Village Players Theatre, Oak Park, Illinois, May, 2006.

2007:
Madame Butterfly by Giacomo Puccini, the Village Players Theatre, Oak Park, Illinois, June, 2007.

2008:
La Traviata by Verdi, the New Buffalo Performing Arts Center, New Buffalo, Michigan, July 26, 2008.

Caroline Myss' Voices of the Sacred, songs of the world's most famous and beloved sacred music, recorded in partnership with Sounds True©. The CD release concert was held at Unity Temple, Oak Park, Illinois, Sept. 6, 2008.

2009:
"The World's Greatest Arias" a concert including songs from La Traviata, Madame Butterfly, La Boheme and The Merry Widow, the Beverly Arts Center, Chicago, Illinois, Nov. 21, 2009.

2010:
"A Night of Opera and Song," including songs of Tosti, Tchaikovsky, and Donizetti, as well as traditional Japanese dance and the world premiere of a song by composer Daniel Vines, Unity Temple, Oak Park, Illinois, Aug. 5, 2010.

2011:
La Traviata, Opera Up Close, The Center for Performing Arts, Governors State University, University Park, Illinois, Mar. 27, 2011.

2013:
"Celebrate Earth Day" with Bellissima Opera, Munch Restaurant, Oak Park, Illinois, Apr. 22, 2013.

2014:
"Music of the Universe," a multimedia concert in voice, violin, dance and imagery. The concert featured an original commission by composer David Shenton, who composed a song to the poem "Music of the Universe" by Charlie Rossiter, at Unity Temple, Oak Park, Illinois, Jun. 1, 2014.

2022:
An International Women's Day Concert, including compositions by Chicago women including Patrice Michaels, Lena J. McLin, Elizabeth Rudolph, and Lita Grier. Performed at Good Shepherd Lutheran Church, Oak Park, Illinois, Mar. 8, 2022.
