= R. Kelly =

American former singer (born 1967)

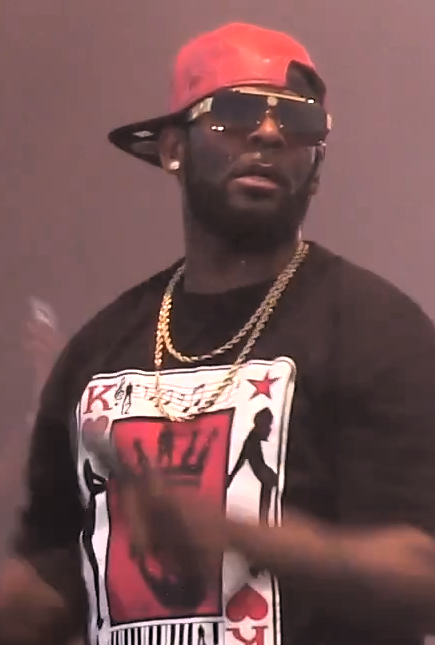
- Kelly in 2017
- Born: Robert Sylvester Kelly; January 8, 1967 (age 59); Chicago, Illinois, U.S.
- Other names: Pied Piper; Kellz
- Occupations: Singer; songwriter; record producer; actor
- Years active: 1987–2019
- Works: Discography; production; videography
- Spouses: Aaliyah (m. 1994; ann. 1995); Andrea Lee (m. 1996; div. 2009)
- Children: 3
- Awards: Full list
- Musical career
- Genres: R&B; hip-hop; soul; pop
- Instruments: Vocals; piano; keyboards; guitar
- Labels: Rockland; Jive; RCA
- Formerly of: Public Announcement
- Criminal information
- Status: Imprisoned
- Criminal charges: Racketeering; sexual exploitation of a child; bribery; coercion; sex trafficking; violation of the Mann Act; child enticement; producing child pornography
- Penalty: 31 years imprisonment (30 years racketeering, 1 year child pornography (Note: Kelly was sentenced to 20 years imprisonment for child pornography. Those years will run with his current sentence for racketeering; adding just one extra year for the charge.))

Details
- Imprisoned at: FCI Butner Medium
- Website: www.r-kelly.com (archived from Wayback Machine)

Robert Sylvester Kelly (born January 8, 1967), known professionally as R. Kelly, is an American former singer, songwriter, and record producer who is credited with prolific commercial success in contemporary R&B, hip-hop, and pop music recordings. Nicknamed "the King of R&B", "the King of Pop-Soul", and "the Pied Piper of R&B", Billboard has him ranked as the 9th greatest R&B artist of all time. His career ended following his 2021 and 2022 convictions and subsequent 31-year prison sentence for a series of child sex offences.

Born on the South Side of Chicago, Illinois, Kelly began performing in the subway under the Chicago "L" tracks, and regularly busked at the "L" stop on the Red Line's Jackson station in the Loop. During his recording career, Kelly released 18 studio albums which yielded a number of hit singles, including "I Believe I Can Fly", "Bump N' Grind", "Your Body's Callin'", "Fiesta (Remix)", "Ignition (Remix)", "Step in the Name of Love (Remix)", "If I Could Turn Back the Hands of Time", "The World's Greatest", "I'm a Flirt (Remix)", and the hip hopera Trapped in the Closet. In 1998, he won three Grammy Awards for "I Believe I Can Fly".

Alongside his recording career, Kelly's songwriting and production work was credited on albums by Michael Jackson, Britney Spears, Whitney Houston, Mariah Carey, Celine Dion, Justin Bieber, Janet Jackson, Chris Brown, Aaliyah, Usher, Ciara, Toni Braxton, Luther Vandross, and Mary J. Blige. Kelly received a Grammy Award nomination for his contributions to Jackson's 1995 single, "You Are Not Alone", which earned a Guinness World Record as the first song to debut atop the Billboard Hot 100 in the chart's history. Kelly's 1998 collaboration with Dion, "I'm Your Angel", did so once more.

Kelly sold over 75 million albums and singles worldwide, making him one of the best-selling music artists of all time, and the most successful R&B male artist of the 1990s. The Recording Industry Association of America (RIAA) has recognized Kelly as one of the best-selling artists in the United States with 40 million albums sold. In 2011, Kelly was named the most successful R&B artist of the last 25 years by Billboard. Kelly won Grammy Awards, BET Awards, Soul Train Music Awards, Billboard Music Awards, NAACP Image Awards, and American Music Awards.

Kelly had long been the subject of accusations of sexual abuse, including that of minors, dating back to the 1990s. Following leaked video recordings, Kelly was prosecuted on child pornography charges in 2002, leading to a controversial trial that ended with his acquittal in 2008 on all charges. The 2019 documentary Surviving R. Kelly re-examined Kelly's alleged sexual misconduct with minors, prompting RCA Records to terminate his contract. Renewed interest in the allegations resulted in additional investigations by law enforcement beginning in 2019, which led to multiple indictments and Kelly's arrest. In 2021 and 2022, he was convicted on multiple charges involving child sexual abuse and sex trafficking. As of 2026, he is serving a 31-year combined sentence at FCC Butner Medium I in North Carolina.

== Early life ==
Robert Sylvester Kelly was born on the South Side of Chicago, Illinois, on January 8, 1967, at Chicago Lying-In Hospital (now University of Chicago Medical Center) in the city's Hyde Park neighborhood. He has five siblings (three of whom are half): two older sisters and brother, along with a younger brother and sister. His mother, Joanne, was a schoolteacher and devout Baptist. She was born in Arkansas. The identity of his father, who was absent from Kelly's life and later raised two children, is not known. His family lived in the Ida B. Wells Homes public housing project in the Black Metropolis–Bronzeville District of Chicago's Douglas neighborhood, also on the city's south side. Around the time he was five years old, Kelly's mother married his stepfather, Lucious, who reportedly worked for an airline. Kelly began singing in the church choir at age eight.

=== Trauma and abuse ===
Kelly described having a girlfriend, Lulu, at age eight, in his 2012 autobiography Soulacoaster: The Diary of Me. He stated that their last play date turned tragic when, after fighting with older children over a play area by a creek, she was pushed into the water, swept downstream by a fast-moving current, and drowned. Kelly called Lulu his first musical inspiration.

Kelly said members of his household would act differently when his mother and grandparents were not home. This included highly provocative dress and behavior. Kelly stated that when he was eight, an adult woman in the household coerced him into photographing her while having intercourse with an adult male partner.

From age 8 to 14, he was often sexually abused by an older female family member. Kelly's younger brother, Carey, stated that he suffered from years of sexual abuse at the hands of their older sister, Theresa, who was entrusted with babysitting the siblings. Carey stated that although their older brother, Bruce, was spared and allowed to play outside, both he and Kelly were punished at separate times indoors by Theresa, who refused to acknowledge the abuse when confronted years later.

Explaining why he never told anyone, Kelly wrote in his autobiography that he was "too afraid and too ashamed". Around age 10, Kelly was also sexually abused by an older male who was a friend of the family. In his autobiography, Kelly describes being shot in the shoulder at age 13 by boys who were attempting to steal his bike, although a family friend claims his mother disputed this, stating that the gunshot was self-inflicted during a suicide attempt.

=== Turn toward music ===
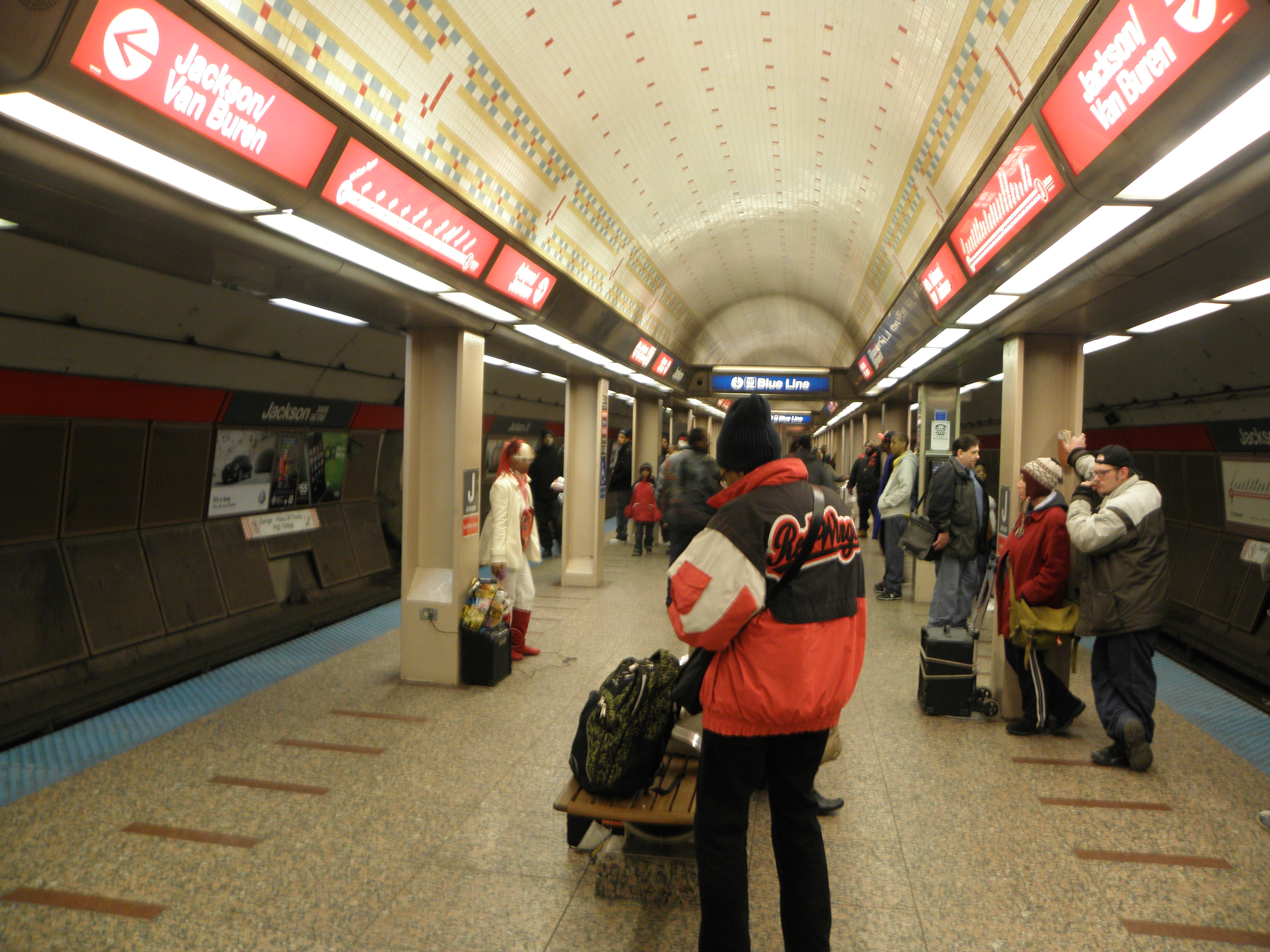
As a teenager, Kelly began performing in public at Chicago "L" stations on the Red Line (CTA).

In September 1980, Kelly entered Kenwood Academy in the city's Hyde Park-Kenwood district, where he met music teacher Lena McLin, who encouraged Kelly to perform Stevie Wonder's "Ribbon in the Sky" in the high school talent show. A shy Kelly put on sunglasses, was escorted onto the stage, performed the song, and was awarded first prize. McLin encouraged Kelly to leave the high school basketball team and concentrate on music. She said he was furious at first, but after his performance in the talent show, he changed his mind. Kelly was diagnosed with dyslexia, which left him unable to read or write. Kelly dropped out of high school after attending Kenwood Academy for one year. He began performing in the subway under the Chicago "L" tracks. He regularly busked at the "L" stop on the Red Line's Jackson station in the Loop.

In his youth, Kelly played basketball with Illinois state champion basketball player Ben Wilson and later sang "It's So Hard to Say Goodbye to Yesterday" at Wilson's funeral.

== Career ==
During his recording career, Kelly sold over 75 million records worldwide, making him the most commercially successful male R&B artist of the 1990s and one of the world's best-selling music artists. He won three Grammys for his song "I Believe I Can Fly", and was also nominated for his song "You Are Not Alone" recorded by Michael Jackson. Critics dubbed him "the King of R&B" while he billed himself the "Pied Piper of R&B".

=== 1989–1994: Born into the 90's and 12 Play ===
MGM (Musically Gifted Men or Mentally Gifted Men) was formed in 1989 with Robert Kelly, Marc McWilliams, Vincent Walker and Shawn Brooks. In 1990, MGM were offered a contract with an independent label, Tavdash Records. Shortly after, they recorded and released one single, "Why You Wanna Play Me". Kelly gained national recognition when MGM participated on the talent TV show Big Break, hosted by Natalie Cole. MGM performed "All My Love", which would become a demo for Kelly's song "She's Got That Vibe". The group went on to win the $100,000 grand prize in 1991 before they disbanded.

In 1991, Kelly signed with Jive Records. Kelly's debut album, Born into the 90's, was released in early 1992 (credited as R. Kelly and Public Announcement). The album, released during the new jack swing period of the early 1990s, yielded the R&B hits "She's Got That Vibe", "Honey Love", "Dedicated", and "Slow Dance (Hey Mr. DJ)", with Kelly singing lead vocals. During late 1992, Kelly and Public Announcement embarked on a tour entitled "60653" after the zip code of their Chicago neighborhood. This would be the only album co-credited with Public Announcement. Kelly separated from the group in 1993.

When I create a song for myself or another artist, I see the entire thing—what the song should be like, how it should be produced, how the video should look, the image of the artist for the single—it's a package deal.

— R. Kelly (1994)

Kelly's first solo album, 12 Play, was released on November 9, 1993, and yielded the singer's first number-one hit, "Bump N' Grind", which spent a record-breaking 12 weeks at number one on the Billboard Hot R&B Singles chart. Subsequent hit singles: "Your Body's Callin'" (U.S. Hot 100: No. 13, U.S. R&B: No. 2) and "Sex Me" (U.S. Hot 100: No. 20, U.S. R&B: No. 8). Both singles sold 500,000 copies in the United States and were certified Gold by the RIAA. In 1994, 12 Play was certified Gold by the RIAA, eventually going six times platinum.

In 1994, Kelly established himself as a leading producer by producing songs for various artists, including Aaliyah, Janet Jackson, and Changing Faces. He co-headlined a tour with Salt-N-Pepa and headlined the Budweiser Superfest tour.

=== 1995–1996 R. Kelly and "I Believe I Can Fly" ===
In 1995, Kelly garnered his first Grammy nominations; two for writing, producing, and composing Michael Jackson's last number-one hit, "You Are Not Alone".

Kelly's success continued with the November 14, 1995, release of R. Kelly, his eponymous second studio album. Critics praised him for his departure from salacious bedroom songs to embracing vulnerability. New York Times contributor Stephen Holden described Kelly as "The reigning king of pop-soul sex talks a lot tougher than Barry White, the father of such fluffed-up pillow talks and along with Marvin Gaye and Donny Hathaway, [both] major influences for Kelly." In December 1995, Professor Michael Eric Dyson critiqued Kelly's self-titled album "R. Kelly" for VIBE. Dyson described Kelly's growth from the 12 Play album: "Kelly reshapes his personal turmoil to artistic benefit" and noted that Kelly is "reborn before our very own ears".

The album reached number one on the Billboard 200 chart, becoming Kelly's first number one album on the chart, and reached number one on the R&B album charts; his second. The R. Kelly album spawned three platinum hit singles: "You Remind Me of Something" (U.S. Hot 100: No. 4, U.S. R&B: No. 1), "I Can't Sleep Baby (If I)" (U.S. Hot 100: No. 5, U.S. R&B: No. 1), and "Down Low (Nobody Has To Know)" (U.S. Hot 100: No. 4, U.S. R&B: No. 1); a duet with Ronald Isley. Kelly's self-titled album sold four million copies, receiving 4× platinum certification from the RIAA. He promoted the album with a 50-city "Down Low Top Secret Tour" with LL Cool J, Xscape, and Solo.

On November 26, 1996, Kelly released "I Believe I Can Fly", an inspirational song originally released on the soundtrack for the film Space Jam. "I Believe I Can Fly" reached No. 2 on the Billboard Hot 100, and No. 1 on the UK charts for three weeks and won three Grammy Awards in 1998. In that same year, he contributed to "Freak Tonight" for the A Thin Line Between Love and Hate soundtrack.

=== 1997–2001: Basketball, R., TP-2.com, and Rockland Records ===
In 1997, Kelly signed a contract to play professional basketball with the Atlantic City Seagulls of the USBL. He wore the number 12 in honor of his album 12 Play. Kelly said "I love basketball enough to not totally let go of my music, but just put it to the side for a minute and fulfill some dreams of mine that I've had for a long time." Kelly's USBL contract contained a clause that would allow him to fulfill a music obligation when necessary. "If Whitney Houston needs a song written", said Ken Gross, the Seagulls owner who signed Kelly, "he would be able to leave the team to do that and come back". "It wasn't a gimmick", Gross continued, "he's a ballplayer. He can play."

In the same year, Kelly collaborated with American rapper The Notorious B.I.G. for the song "Fuck You Tonight" on the posthumous album Life After Death.

In 1998, he launched his own label, Rockland Records, in a distribution deal with Jimmy Iovine's Interscope Records. The label's roster included artists Sparkle, Boo & Gotti, Talent, Vegas Cats, Lady, Frankie, Secret Weapon, and Rebecca F. That May, Sparkle, Rockland's first signed artist, released her eponymous debut album. In addition to producing and writing the project, Kelly made vocal contribution to the hit duet "Be Careful", which became a serious factor as to why the album was certified platinum in December 2000.

On November 17, 1998, Kelly released his fourth studio and first double album, R. Musically, the album spans different genres from pop (Celine Dion), street rap (Nas and Jay-Z) to Blues ("Suicide"). Dave Hoekstra of the Los Angeles Times described the album as "easily the most ambitious project of his career". In the summer of 1999, he wrote and produced a majority of the soundtrack to the Martin Lawrence and Eddie Murphy film, Life, which features tracks from K-Ci & JoJo, Maxwell, Mýa, and Destiny's Child, among others. The soundtrack was also released on the Rockland imprint.

In early 2000, Kelly received multiple awards reflecting his status as an established R&B superstar. In January 2000, he won Favorite Male Soul/R&B Artist at the American Music Awards and, in February, was nominated for several Grammy Awards, including Best Male R&B Vocal Performance ("When a Woman's Fed Up"), Best R&B Album (R.), and Best Rap Performance by a Duo or Group ("Satisfy You") with P. Diddy.

On November 7, 2000, he released his fifth studio album, TP-2.com, a project aligned with his breakthrough album, 12 Play. Unlike R., all songs on TP-2.com were written, arranged, and produced by Kelly. AllMusic's Jason Birchmeier gave TP-2.com 4 stars and stated: "Kelly knows how to take proven formulas and funnel them through his own stylistic aesthetic, which usually means slowing down the tempo, laying on lush choruses of strings and background vocals, taming down the lyrics for radio, and catering his pitch primarily to wistful women.

In 2001, Kelly won the Outstanding Achievement Award at the Music of Black Origin or MOBO Awards and Billboard magazine ranked TP-2.com number 94 on the magazine's Top 200 Albums of the Decade. Kelly's song, "The World's Greatest", from the soundtrack to the 2001 autobiographical film, Ali, was a hit.

=== 2002–2003: The Best of Both Worlds and Chocolate Factory ===
On January 24, 2002, at a press conference announcing the completion of Kelly and Jay-Z's first collaborative album, The Best of Both Worlds, celebrities such as Johnnie Cochran, Russell Simmons, Luther Vandross, and Sean Combs praised the album, with Jay-Z stating that he hoped the collaboration represents "more unity for black people on a whole". MTV's Shaheem Reid wrote: "And if Jay and Kelly can put their egos to the side long enough to wrap up and promote their album, then their labels—Def Jam and Jive, respectively—can surely figure out a way to join forces and make cheddar together."

On February 8, 2002, Kelly performed at the opening ceremony of the 2002 Winter Olympics, a week after a news scandal broke of a sex tape that appeared to show Kelly with an underage girl.

Following a leak of the joint album on February 22, 2002, Roc-A-Fella and Jive moved the release date one week earlier in an effort to curtail piracy. Jay-Z expressed frustration about the album leak to MTV News, describing the event as both a "gift" and a "curse." Upon release on March 19, 2002, The Best of Both Worlds sold 285,000 copies in its opening week and debuted at number two on the Billboard 200. It was a critical and commercial disappointment.

In May 2002, six months prior to the scheduled release of Kelly's sixth studio album, Loveland, a bootleg copy containing 15 tracks had been leaked. In response, Kelly began work on the album now known as Chocolate Factory, opting to release Loveland as a deluxe edition bonus disc. In October of that year, Kelly released "Ignition (Remix)", the lead single from the album. It would spend 42 weeks on the Billboard Hot 100, peaking at number two.

On February 18, 2003, Kelly released Chocolate Factory, which debuted as the number-one album on the Billboard 200. It sold 532,000 copies in its first week. The album was met with critical acclaim, and supported by two more singles. "Snake", the album's second single, was followed by "Step in the Name of Love (Remix)", which charted for 70 weeks, reaching number one on the R&B/Hip-Hop Airplay chart. Later that year, in September, Kelly's first greatest hits album, The R. in R&B Collection, Vol. 1, was released which included "Thoia Thoing" and two other previously unreleased songs.

=== 2004–2005: Unfinished Business, Happy People/U Saved Me and TP.3 Reloaded ===
Between mid-2003 and early 2004, Kelly began work on a double CD album, one with "happy" tracks and another with "inspirational" tracks. The double album, Happy People/U Saved Me, was released on August 24, 2004. It debuted at number two on the Billboard 200, with first week sales of 264,000 copies. Both of the album's title tracks respectively performed underwhelmingly; "Happy People" charted at number twenty-nine on the Adult R&B Songs chart while "U Saved Me" peaked at number fifty-two on the Billboard Hot 100.

Two months later, Kelly and Jay-Z reunited to release their second collaborative album, Unfinished Business. The album received criticism and, as with the pair's previous collaboration, it was also a commercial failure, despite debuting at number one on the Billboard 200. Album promotion and its Best of Both Worlds tour were both plagued by tension between the stars, with Kelly reportedly showing up late or not at all to gigs. Kelly complained that the touring lights were not directed towards him and allegedly assaulted the tour's lighting director.

Jay-Z eventually removed Kelly halfway through the tour, after a member of Jay-Z's entourage pepper sprayed Kelly on October 29, 2004. Tyran "Ty Ty" Smith was charged with assault, but took a plea deal for disorderly conduct. Kelly bounced back commercially after appearing on Ja Rule's single, "Wonderful" alongside Ashanti. In November 2004, "Wonderful" charted at number five on the Billboard Hot 100 and topped the UK Singles Chart. The single was certified gold by the RIAA in May 2005.

After finishing Happy People/U Saved Me and Unfinished Business in 2004, Kelly released TP.3 Reloaded in July 2005. It became Kelly's fifth consecutive number-one album in his career. TP.3 Reloaded was heavily cross-promoted alongside the first five chapters of Kelly's musical serial, the "hip hopera" Trapped in the Closet.

=== 2006–2009: Double Up and Untitled, Africa ===
In December 2006, Kelly built momentum for his eighth solo studio album, Double Up, after guest-appearing on Bow Wow's "I'm a Flirt". Three months later, Kelly's remix of "I'm a Flirt" was released, but instead of Bow Wow, it featured T.I. and T-Pain. On May 29, 2007, the album was released. It became Kelly's sixth and final album in his career to chart at number one on the Billboard 200. Kelly's other singles from Double Up titled "Same Girl" was a duet of Kelly and Usher, while "Rise Up" was a tribute to the victims of the Virginia Tech shooting that occurred earlier that year in April, a month before the album was released. The song was previously released as a digital download on May 15, 2007. Proceeds were donated to the Hokie Spirit Memorial Fund to help family members of the victims of the shootings.

Kelly began his Double Up tour with Ne-Yo, Keyshia Cole and J. Holiday opening for him. One week into the tour, promoter Leonard Rowe had Ne-Yo removed from the tour because of a contract dispute. However, Ne-Yo alleges that the reason for the dropout was because Ne-Yo believes he received a better response from critics and fans. Ne-Yo won a lawsuit that he filed against Rowe Entertainment in 2008. Kelly was not mentioned in the lawsuit. In December 2007, Kelly failed to appear at another preliminary court hearing on his case due to his tour bus being held up in Utah. The judge threatened to revoke Kelly's bond, but eventually decided against it. In 2008, Kelly released a rap track titled "I'm a Beast" in which he coarsely attacked his detractors, yet did not name the subjects of the song.

In 2008, before and after being acquitted on charges of producing child sexual abuse material, Billboard reported that Kelly had plans to release his newest album titled 12 Play: Fourth Quarter in the summer of that year but the album was postponed. Billboard named Kelly among the most successful artists ever for its 50th Anniversary List. In the spring, the promotional single "Hair Braider", peaked at No. 56 on Billboard's R&B chart. On July 28, the entire album leaked online, causing the title to be scrapped.

In February 2009, Kelly announced that he was working on a new album called Untitled with a projected release date of September 29, but it had been delayed to December. In June 2009, he released his first mixtape, The "Demo" Tape, presented by DJ Skee and DJ Drama.

Kelly headlined the Arise African Fashion Awards in Johannesburg, South Africa, on June 20, 2009. He performed in Cape Town, followed by Nigeria as part of the annual ThisDay music and fashion festival in July. That same month, he released "Number One", featuring singer-songwriter Keri Hilson. Then, on December 1, Kelly's untitled ninth solo album was released. It charted on the Billboard 200 at number four. More singles from the album include "Echo", "Supaman High" and "Be My No. 2". In January 2010, Kelly performed in Kampala, Uganda. "I'm very excited about my first visit to Africa, I've dreamed about this for a long time and it's finally here", Kelly said in a statement. "It will be one of the highlights of not only my career but my life. I can't wait to perform in front of my fans in Africa—who have been some of the best in the world."

=== 2010–2012: Epic, Love Letter, throat surgery, and Write Me Back ===
Kelly performed at the 2010 FIFA World Cup opening ceremony on June 11, 2010. In an interview in the September 2010 issue of XXL magazine, Kelly said he was working on three new albums (Epic, Love Letter, and Zodiac) which he described as "remixing himself". Epic, a compilation filled with powerful ballads including "The World's Greatest" and "Sign of a Victory", only saw a European release on September 21, 2010. However, it is also available for streaming worldwide.

In November 2010, Kelly collaborated with several African musicians forming a supergroup known as One8. The group featured 2Face from Nigeria, Ali Kiba from Tanzania, Congolese singer Fally Ipupa, 4X4 from Ghana, hip-hop artist Movaizhaleine from Gabon, Zambia's JK, Ugandan hip-hop star Navio and Kenya's Amani, the only female in the group. The first release from the group was "Hands Across the World" written and produced by Kelly.

Kelly's tenth album Love Letter, released on December 14, 2010, included 15 songs, one of which was Kelly singing "You Are Not Alone", a track Kelly originally wrote for Michael Jackson. The first single "When a Woman Loves" was nominated for a Grammy for Best Traditional R&B Vocal Performance at the 53rd Annual Grammy Awards.

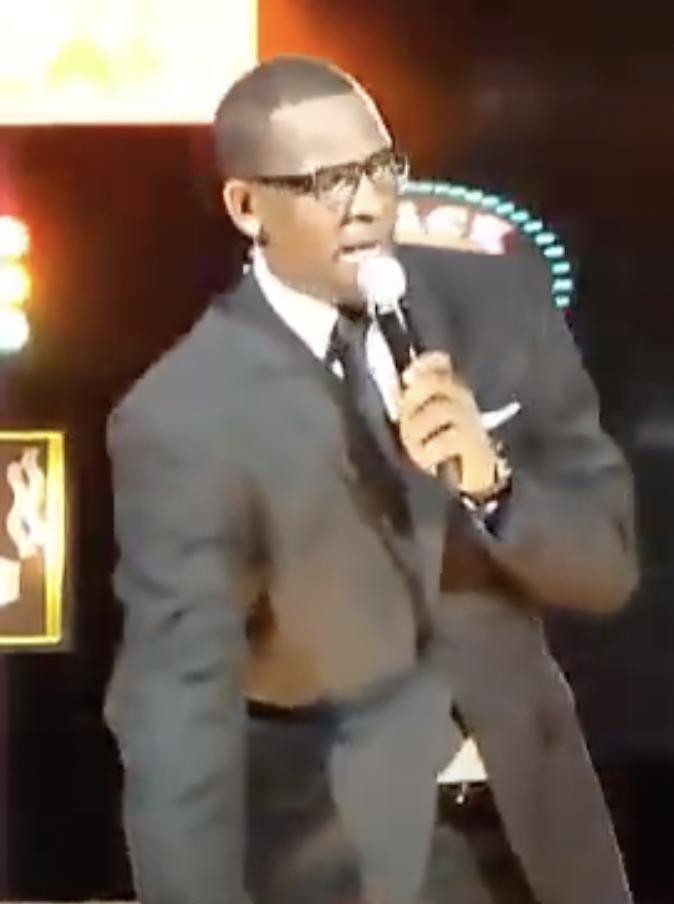
R. Kelly in 2011

At the 2011 Pre-Grammy Gala in Los Angeles, Kelly performed a medley of hits, and, in March 2011, Kelly was named the No. 1 R&B artist of the last 25 years by Billboard.

On July 19, 2011, Kelly was admitted to the Northwestern Memorial Hospital in Chicago to undergo emergency throat surgery to drain an abscess on one of his tonsils, and was released on July 21, 2011. He canceled his performance at the Reggae Sumfest in Jamaica that was scheduled for the following Friday. Johnny Gourzong, Sumfest Productions executive director, commented, "We are truly going to miss his presence on the festival." On September 23, 2011, Variety confirmed that Kelly had signed on to write original music for the Sparkle soundtrack.

In 2011, Kelly worked with writer David Ritz on an autobiography entitled Soulacoaster: The Diary of Me, which was later released in the summer of 2012. On October 7, 2011, after Sony's RCA Music Group announced the consolidation of Jive, Arista and J Records into RCA Records, Kelly was set to release music under the RCA brand.

Following his throat surgery, Kelly released "Shut Up" to generally favorable reviews: Spin magazine said, "Kelly taking aim at the haters who said "he's washed up, he's lost it." He hasn't. Dude's voice is in prime smooth R&B form". On December 21, 2011, Kelly made a live appearance on The X Factor and gave his first performance after the surgery. Kelly revealed to Rolling Stone that he felt like he was "just starting out" and how the performance was a "wake up call" for him.

In 2012, Kelly made a series of announcements including a follow-up to the Love Letter album titled Write Me Back, which was released on June 26 to little fanfare, as well as a third installment of Trapped in the Closet and The Single Ladies Tour featuring R&B singer, Tamia. In February 2012, Kelly performed "I Look to You", a song he wrote for Whitney Houston, at Houston's homegoing.

=== 2013–2017: Black Panties, The Buffet, and 12 Nights of Christmas ===
During 2013, Kelly continued his "The Single Ladies Tour". He performed at music festivals across North America, including Bonnaroo, Pitchfork, and Macy's Music Festival. On June 30, 2013, R. Kelly performed live at the BET Awards Show singing hits as well as his new track "My Story" featuring Atlanta rapper 2 Chainz. The song was the lead single for Kelly's twelfth studio album Black Panties. released on December 10, 2013. Writing for New York magazine, David Marchese stated that Black Panties "was like a dare to the world: After all that he'd been accused of, after avoiding conviction, could R. Kelly still get away with making sex-obsessed music?"

In 2013, Kelly collaborated with several artists including Celine Dion, Mariah Carey, Mary J. Blige, and Jennifer Hudson. In an interview with Global Grind in November, he described follow up work with Celine Dion after their number-one single "I'm Your Angel" from 1998. Kelly worked with singer Mariah Carey for her album Me. I Am Mariah... The Elusive Chanteuse.

Kelly co-wrote and sang on Lady Gaga's song "Do What U Want" from her 2013 album Artpop, performing the duet with her on Saturday Night Live on November 16, 2013, and at the 2013 American Music Awards. "Do What U Want" was later removed from streaming services and re-releases of Gaga's Artpop album following sexual misconduct allegations against Kelly in early 2019. He also collaborated with Birdman and Lil Wayne on "We Been On", a single from the Cash Money Records compilation, Rich Gang. He also appeared on Twista's first single on his ninth album, Dark Horse. On November 17, 2013, Kelly and Justin Bieber debuted a collaboration titled "PYD".

Kelly was featured on the soundtrack album of the film The Best Man Holiday with his song "Christmas, I'll Be Steppin'". Kelly stated his intention to tour with R&B singer Mary J. Blige on "The King & Queen Tour" prior to the Black Panties Tour while continuing to create segments of the hip hopera Trapped in the Closet. In July 2014, Kelly announced that he was working on a house music album.

In November 2015, Kelly released "Switch Up" featuring fellow Chicagoan Jeremih and Lil Wayne, followed by "Wake Up Everybody", "Marching Band" and "Backyard Party". The following month, the album containing those singles, The Buffet, was released. It charted poorly on the Billboard 200 at number sixteen with first-week sales of 39,000 album-equivalent copies. During November 2015, R. Kelly released a song with Ty Dolla Sign called "Actress" off the album Free TC. The following year, after a two-and-a-half-year delay, Kelly presented his only Christmas album, also his fourteenth and final studio album in his career thus far, 12 Nights of Christmas, which was released on October 21, 2016.

=== 2017–2022: Guest appearances and "I Admit" ===
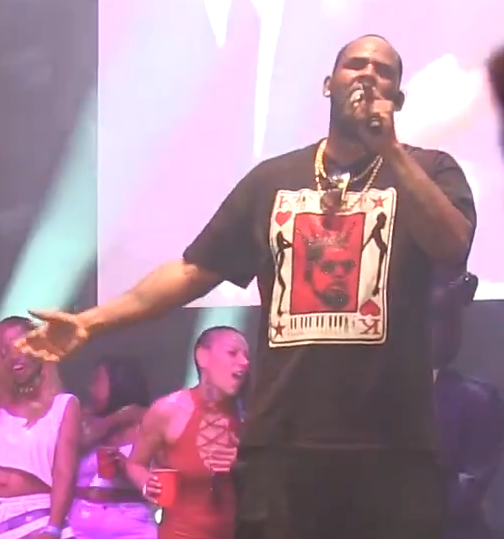
R. Kelly performing in 2017

On March 17, 2017, Pitbull released the song "Dedicated" off his album Climate Change featuring guest appearances from Kelly and Austin Mahone.

Kelly released the 19-minute-long "I Admit" on SoundCloud on July 23, 2018, as a response to his accusers. The song does not contain any criminal admissions despite its title and chorus, which repeats the lyric "I admit it, I did it". In "I Admit", Kelly denies allegations of domestic violence and pedophilia, asserting that they are matters of opinion. Kelly also denounces Jim DeRogatis and repudiates his investigative report's claim of Kelly operating a "sex cult". Addressing the Mute R. Kelly social media campaign, Kelly sings, "only God can mute me".

The song was criticized by reviewers, who described it as an act of trolling. Many outlets compared the song to that of his "Heaven I Need a Hug" extended version, Trapped in the Closet opera, "I Believe I Can Fly" concert remix, and O. J. Simpson's autobiographical novel If I Did It. Andrea Kelly and Carey Killa Kelly (R. Kelly's ex-wife and brother, respectively) responded to "I Admit" with songs that contain additional allegations against R. Kelly.

An album credited to Kelly titled I Admit It after and including the 19-minute song from 2018 was released on streaming services on December 9, 2022, but was taken down after it was not approved by Sony or R. Kelly's team. The album was credited to Sony's Legacy Recordings but actually uploaded by Real Talk Entertainment, who had released the album through a sub-label also named Legacy Recordings. This resulted in the credited distributor, Universal Music Group–owned Ingrooves, cutting ties with Real Talk Entertainment.

== Artistry ==
=== Musical style and influences ===
Kelly's music took root in R&B, hip-hop and soul. He was influenced by listening to his mother, Joanne Kelly, sing. She played records by Stevie Wonder, Donny Hathaway and Marvin Gaye, inspirations for Kelly. In reference to Hathaway, Kelly stated: "A guy like Donny Hathaway had a focused, sexual texture in his voice that I always wanted in mine. He had smooth, soulful tones, but he was spiritual at the same time." In his autobiography, Kelly stated that he was heavily influenced by Marvin Gaye's R&B Lothario image. "I had to make a 'baby-makin'' album. If Marvin Gaye did it, I wanted to do it", Kelly said.

While Kelly created a smooth, professional mixture of hip-hop beats, soulman crooning and funk, the most distinctive element of his music is its explicit sensuality. Critics and reference works also described his style as combining gospel-tinged vocal delivery, tightly arranged contemporary R&B production, and a hybrid use of R&B and hip-hop phrasing. "Sex Me", "Bump n' Grind", "Your Body's Callin'", and "Feelin' on Yo Booty" are considered to be examples, as their productions were seductive enough to sell such blatant come-ons. Kelly's crossover appeal was also sustained by his development of a flair for pop balladry.

=== Vocal style and lyrical themes ===
Writing for the New York Daily News in 1997, Nunyo Demasio stated "With a voice that easily shifts from booming baritone to seductive alto, Kelly has gained international celebrity by combining streetwise rhythms with sexually explicit lyrics." Love and sex are the topics of the majority of Kelly's lyrical content, although he has written about a wide variety of themes such as inspiration and spirituality. Chicago Sun-Times reporters Jim DeRogatis and Abdon Pallasch observed about the contrasting themes: "... the image he liked to project was that of the "R&B Thug"... bringing the streetwise persona of the gangsta rapper into the more polite world of R&B."

Kelly expressed that he writes from everyday experiences and prides himself on being versatile. Larry Khan, senior vice president of Jive's urban marketing and promotion, said that Kelly's musical compass is second to none. DeRogatis and Pallasch reported that at concerts where Kelly would go from singing "Like a Real Freak" to "I Wish": "Many fans found these abrupt shifts between the transcendent and the venal, the inspirational and the X-rated jarring."

=== Influence ===
Kelly is considered to be one of the most successful R&B artists since the mid-1980s. He is also one of the bestselling music artists in the United States, with over 30 million albums sold, as well as only the fifth black artist to enter the top 50 of the same list. Rolling Stone magazine called him "arguably the most important R&B figure of the 1990s and 2000s". Billboard, ranking him the 9th greatest R&B artist of all time, said "from a purely musical perspective, there’s no denying that Kelly is one of the best contemporary R&B artists to ever pick up a microphone." Music executive Barry Weiss described Kelly as "the modern-day Prince, although there's a bit of Marvin Gaye in him, and a bit of Irving Berlin". R. Kelly has also been compared to artists like Sam Cooke and Bobby Brown.

In addition to his solo and collaboration success, Kelly has also written and produced several hit songs, such as "Age Ain't Nothing but a Number" for Aaliyah, "Fortunate" for Maxwell, "You Are Not Alone" for Michael Jackson, "G.H.E.T.T.O.U.T." for Changing Faces, "Bump, Bump, Bump" for B2K, and many more.

== Honors and awards ==
Kelly has received and been nominated for multiple awards, as a songwriter, producer, and singer. He won three Grammy Awards for his song "I Believe I Can Fly": Best Male R&B Vocal Performance, Best Rhythm and Blues Song, and Best Song Written Specifically for a Motion Picture or for Television. After Kelly's federal conviction in New York, The Recording Academy stated in 2021 they wouldn't strip Kelly of his awards despite his "disturbing" actions.

Kelly was given a key to the city of Baton Rouge, Louisiana, in 2013 as "an artist whose music brings generations together". On September 30, 2021, following his New York conviction of multiple sex crimes, the key was rescinded.

In October 2024, Hotel Riu Plaza Chicago presented the hotel's rooftop bar, promoting it with a reference to the song "I Believe I Can Fly" by R. Kelly.

== Legal issues ==
Kelly has faced repeated accusations of sexual abuse for incidents dating from 1991 to 2018 and has been the subject of a long-term investigation by the Chicago Sun-Times since August 2000. He has been tried in multiple civil suits and criminal trials, starting in 1996 when Tiffany Hawkins alleged that, starting in 1991 when she was age 15, Kelly, aged 24, had sexual relations with her and encouraged her to entice underaged friends. Following leaked video recordings, Kelly was prosecuted on child pornography charges in 2002, leading to a controversial trial that ended with his acquittal in 2008 on all charges. The 2019 documentary Surviving R. Kelly reexamined Kelly's alleged sexual misconduct with minors, prompting RCA Records to terminate his contract and resulted in additional investigations by law enforcement beginning in 2019. This culminated in a 2021 conviction for violations of the Mann Act and Racketeer Influenced and Corrupt Organizations Act, and a 2022 conviction for production of child pornography. As of 2023, he is serving a 31-year combined sentence at FCI Butner Medium I. On July 30, 2024, multiple news outlets reported that Kelly, alongside his lawyer Jennifer Bonjean, had asked the Supreme Court to review his child pornography case, which could potentially drop 20 years off his sentence. On June 13, 2025, Kelly was hospitalized following an apparent overdose while incarcerated at the Federal Correctional Institute in North Carolina. His attorneys allege that after being placed in solitary confinement on June 10, he was initially given anxiety medication, followed by an increased dosage on June 12. They claim this led to dizziness and vision loss before he collapsed. He was transported to Duke University Hospital, where medical evaluations reportedly revealed blood clots in his lungs and legs. Despite these concerns, Kelly remained under medical observation for two days before being discharged and returned to prison on June 15 against medical advice. His attorneys subsequently filed an emergency motion for release, citing mistreatment and concerns over his safety in custody.

=== Other court cases ===
Other than the federal sex abuse cases, Kelly has been involved in several high-profile criminal cases and lawsuits.

==== Criminal ====
- August 13, 1997: Kelly was found guilty of battery and placed on unsupervised probation for one year in Lafayette, Louisiana, as a result of a July 1996 brawl which involved the singer and his entourage. One of the victims needed a total of 110 facial stitches.
- April 8, 1998: Kelly was arrested in Chicago on three misdemeanor charges of disorderly conduct, including one charge of violating noise ordinance for playing his music extremely loud from his car, during a test run. He was allegedly confrontational as he was arrested and placed into custody. The vehicle he was testing audio in was impounded and placed on a $500 daily recovery fee. Prosecutors from the district attorney's office dropped the first two charges on May 7, and the noise charge on July 22 that year.
- March 6, 2019: Kelly was taken to the Cook County Jail after failing to pay child support in the amount of $161,633 to his former wife, Andrea. Three days later, he was released after someone, whose identity was withheld, paid off the child support on his behalf. His lawyer says he could not discuss the payment due to a gag order.

==== Civil suits ====
- November 1, 2004: Kelly launched a $75 million lawsuit against former friend Jay-Z and several concert organizers and/or promoters for removing him from the Best of Both Worlds tour. The lawsuit for breach of contract, which sought $75 million in damages ($60 million in punitive damages and $15 million for lost income) was a result of not being able to tour.
- January 2005: Jay-Z countersued the singer, claiming Kelly showed erratic behavior including being late or absent attendances, vacating deadlines, and continued demands or requests that led to several cancellations and resulted in loss of gross. Kelly's lawyers challenged it as "inaccurate smears of [Mr. Kelly] that are utterly irrelevant to the issues of the case" but confirmed the rapper's refusal to continue work with Kelly after the Madison Square Garden incident and thus broke the contract. Jay-Z's counter suit was dismissed by a judge that May.
- November 2005: Kelly sued Jay-Z again, claiming that now Roc Nation executive Tyran "Ty Ty" Smith was awarded with the position of vice president at the artist and repertoire department of Def Jam Recordings (which Jay was president of at the time), as a result of the latter pepper-spraying Kelly on October 29, 2004.

== Personal life ==
Kelly's mother, Joanne, died from cancer in 1993. He has given conflicting accounts of where he was during his mother's death. His oldest daughter, JoAnn (b. 1998), was named after the singer's mother, but is also known as Buku Abi.

In 1996, Kelly married Andrea Kelly (née Lee), his former backup dancer and mother of his three children, the aforementioned JoAnn, as well as Jaah (b. 2000), and Robert Jr. (b. 2002). Andrea filed a restraining order against Kelly in September 2005 after a physical altercation, ultimately filing for divorce in 2006. In January 2009, their divorce was finalized after 13 years of marriage. In later years, Andrea accused Kelly of physical, verbal, and mental abuse, including in Surviving R. Kelly (2019).

Kelly reportedly had a long relationship with gospel singer Deleon Richards in the 1990s. In 2005, a Chicago man was charged for attempting to extort Richards' husband, Gary Sheffield, by allegedly threatening to release a sex tape of Richards with an ex-boyfriend, reportedly Kelly. In January 2006, the man was sentenced to 27 months in prison.

=== Philanthropy ===
In April 2007, Kelly released the song "Rise Up" for Virginia Tech after the 2007 school shooting and donated the net proceeds to the families of the victims. In 2010, he penned the song "Sign of a Victory" for the FIFA World Cup, with all proceeds benefiting African charities. On April 6, 2011, he performed at a charity event in Chicago benefiting Clara's House, a facility designed to build employment, housing, health care, and education in the projects of Chicago. In 2016, Kelly donated cases of water to the Flint water crisis.

== Discography ==
Solo studio albums

- 12 Play (1993)
- R. Kelly (1995)
- R. (1998)
- TP-2.com (2000)
- Chocolate Factory (2003)
- Happy People/U Saved Me (2004)
- TP.3 Reloaded (2005)
- Double Up (2007)
- Untitled (2009)
- Love Letter (2010)
- Write Me Back (2012)
- Black Panties (2013)
- The Buffet (2015)
- 12 Nights of Christmas (2016)

Collaborative studio albums

- Born into the 90's (with Public Announcement) (1992)
- The Best of Both Worlds (with Jay-Z) (2002)
- Unfinished Business (with Jay-Z) (2004)

== Tours ==
Kelly toured extensively as a live musician. His concert tours included:

- 60653 Tour (w/Public Announcement) (1993)
- The Very Necessary 12 Play Tour (with Salt-N-Pepa) (1994)
- The Down Low Top Secret Tour (with LL Cool J and Xscape) (1996)
- The Get Up on a Room Tour (with Kelly Price, Nas, Foxy Brown, and Deborah Cox) (1999)
- The TP-2.com Tour (with Sunshine Anderson and Syleena Johnson) (2001)
- The Key in the Ignition Tour (with Ashanti) (2003)
- The Best of Both Worlds Tour (with Jay-Z) (2004)
- The Light It Up Tour (2006)
- The Double Up Tour (with J. Holiday and Keyshia Cole) (2007)
- The Ladies Make Some Noise Tour (with K. Michelle) (2009)
- Love Letter Tour (with Keyshia Cole and Marsha Ambrosius) (2011)
- The Single Ladies Tour (with Tamia) (2012–2013)
- Black Panties Tour (2014–2016)
- The Buffet Tour (2016)

== Books written ==
- Soulacoaster: The Diary of Me (2012, autobiography)

== See also ==
- List of artists who reached number one in the United States
- Lists of Billboard number-one singles
- List of highest-certified music artists in the United States
- List of songs recorded by R. Kelly
- List of songs written and produced by R. Kelly
- List of unreleased songs recorded by R. Kelly
- Shaggy defense
