= Mute R. Kelly =

Movement against R. Kelly's musical career

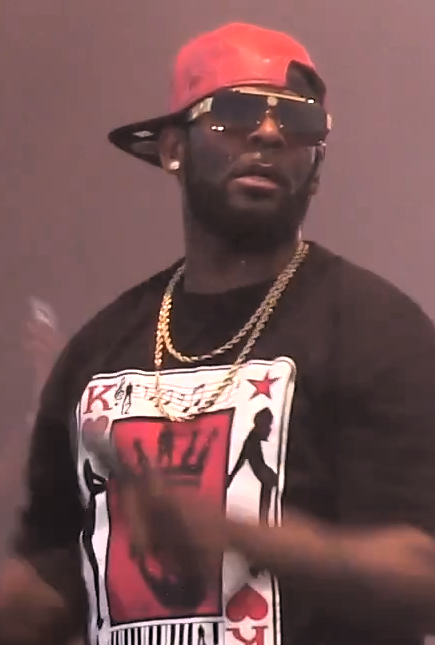
R. Kelly performing in 2017

Mute R. Kelly (styled as #MuteRKelly) was the name of a movement and social media campaign that sought to have American singer R. Kelly convicted of sexual abuse and end financial support for his career. Founded by Kenyette Barnes and Oronike Odeleye in 2017, the movement played a significant part in drawing renewed attention to decades-long allegations against the singer, and became especially prominent following the 2019 release of the documentary series Surviving R. Kelly.

Following Kelly's 2021 conviction on charges that included racketeering and child sexual abuse, co-founder Barnes celebrated the movement's success while acknowledging that its scope went beyond Kelly himself: "Those of us who have fought for justice for so long understand that our work is not over. We also recognize that it was a culture of adultification, misogynoir and rape culture in the entertainment industry, and in the Black community, that enabled his predatory behavior. But we can take a moment now to acknowledge that the truth finally prevailed."

== Founding ==
Over the course of his career, R. Kelly faced allegations of sexual abuse, including that of minors. From his 1994 illegal marriage to R&B singer Aaliyah, who was 15 at the time, to his 2002 arrest on child pornography charges where he was acquitted in his 2008 trial, the allegations caught significant media attention but had little impact on his career.

The campaign was founded by activist Kenyette Barnes and arts consultant Oronike Odeleye in July 2017, when Odeleye was informed Kelly was booked to perform at the Fulton County-owned facility in Atlanta. Oronike stated, "Someone had to stand up for Black women, and if I wasn't willing to do my part—no matter how small—then I couldn't continue to complain. It's time for us to end this man's career. Enough is beyond enough." That same month, Jim DeRogatis reported for BuzzFeed News on new allegations, detailing three sets of parents accusing the singer of holding their daughters in an "abusive cult".

At the time of its founding, co-founder Odeleye described the campaign as such: "#MuteRKelly continues until the Black community has fully financially divested from the man and his music and we tackle the overwhelming issue of sexual abuse". Odeleye is an African American Atlanta-based arts administrator and alongside her, Kenyette Barnes, activist and lobbyist, also sought to lobby elected officials, mobilize activists around the world encourage users of music streaming platforms to #ThumbItDown, when R. Kelly's music plays, in order to change the algorithm of his songs until they stop playing.

== Impact ==
=== Protests ===
The Mute R. Kelly movement impact sparked many actions after being founded. The movement saw a number of public protests in Chicago, Atlanta, Memphis, New York City, North Carolina, and more. Despite the protests, in some cities, Kelly still performed.

However, Kelly's scheduled performance was cancelled at the "Pre-Mother's Day Love Jam" at the University of Illinois at Chicago on May 5, 2018. A women's group at the university created a petition that secured 1300 signatures. Kelly then posted a video on Twitter stating: "First of all, I want to apologize to all of my fans in Chicago, and basically all around the world wherever I'm performing at and they cancelled me." He then went on to say, "I don't know why they cancelled the show. I never heard of a show being cancelled because of rumors, but I guess there's a first time for everything. So, I apologize to you guys and in the meantime, I'm going to try to get to the bottom line of it, you know, as far as my lawyers are concerned, and see exactly what happened and why I was cancelled."

=== Celebrity attention ===
The movement sparked some celebrity attention. Some of R. Kelly's music collaborations received backlash and were removed from streaming services as the Surviving R. Kelly documentary series aired on Lifetime in January 2019 and the #MuteRKelly movement grew. Artists such as Lady Gaga, Celine Dion and the Pussycat Dolls apologized and took down their respective collaborations with Kelly from streaming services. Despite this, Kelly later worked with Bryson Tiller, Chance the Rapper, Justin Bieber, Erykah Badu and Mary J. Blige.

The Time's Up movement released an open letter calling out Apple, Spotify, Ticketmaster, Sony Music and other companies to end their financial relationship with R. Kelly.

The campaign was cited and addressed online by celebrities including Ava DuVernay, Lena Waithe, Lupita Nyong'o, Ne-Yo, and Tarana Burke.

=== Deplatforming from social media and loss of record contract ===
Following the airing of the first season of Surviving R. Kelly, RCA Records terminated their long-running contract with him. Following his conviction, YouTube removed his two channels RKellyVEVO and RKellyTV.

== See also ==
- Bill Cosby sexual assault cases
- Harvey Weinstein sexual abuse cases
- I Admit
- Me Too movement
- Black women in American politics
- Cancel culture
