= 12 Nights of Christmas =

Studio album by R. Kelly
- Released: October 21, 2016
- Recorded: September 2014–September 2016
- Genres: R&B; soul; Christmas
- Length: 43:22
- Label: RCA
- Producer: R. Kelly

R. Kelly chronology
The Buffet (2015)	12 Nights of Christmas (2016)

12 Nights of Christmas is the fourteenth and final studio album by American R&B singer R. Kelly and Kelly's only Christmas album, released on October 21, 2016. It is his final album with RCA Records before the label dropped him in January 2019 following numerous sexual assault allegations. Kelly would subsequently be convicted and sentenced to 31 years in prison for numerous sex crimes.

== Background ==
The album is Kelly's only album to incorporate a holiday theme. The album was supposed to be released in late 2014, but was instead postponed to 2016.

== Commercial performance ==
12 Nights of Christmas debuted at number 177 on the Billboard 200 chart for the week of December 24, 2016.

== Track listing ==
All tracks are written by R. Kelly.

No.	Title	Length
1.	"My Wish for Christmas"	2:02
2.	"Snowman"	3:52
3.	"Home for Christmas"	3:17
4.	"Mrs. Santa Claus"	4:47
5.	"I'm Sending You My Love for Christmas"	4:38
6.	"Letters"	2:51
7.	"Once Upon a Time"	2:04
8.	"Greatest Gift"	3:45
9.	"It's Christmas Day"	4:01
10.	"Christmas Lovin'"	4:58
11.	"Flyin' on My Sleigh"	3:24
12.	"12 Nights of Christmas"	3:43
Total length:		43:22

== Charts ==
Chart (2016)	Peak position
US Billboard 200	177
US Top Holiday Albums (Billboard)	13
US Top R&B/Hip-Hop Albums (Billboard)	11

== Release history ==
Country	Date	Format(s)	Label
United States	October 21, 2016	CD; digital download	RCA
