= Surviving R. Kelly =

American documentary television series (2019–2023)

- Genre: Documentary
- Written by: Nigel Bellis; Astral Finnie
- Starring: Andrea Kelly; Tarana Burke; Sparkle; Kitti Jones; Wendy Williams
- Country of origin: United States
- Original language: English
- No. of seasons: 3
- No. of episodes: 15

Production
- Executive producers: Tamra Simmons; Dream Hampton; Jesse Daniels; Joel Karsberg; Jessica Everleth; Maria Pepin
- Producers: Laura Hoeppner; Charlotte Glover; Allison Brandin; Clarissa Kern; Lisa Nicole Jackson
- Running time: 44–60 minutes
- Production companies: Kreativ Inc.; Bunim/Murray Productions

Original release
- Network: Lifetime
- Release: January 3, 2019 – January 3, 2023

Surviving R. Kelly is an American documentary television series detailing sexual abuse allegations against American singer Robert "R." Kelly. Its first season aired on Lifetime over three nights, from January 3 to January 5, 2019. Filmmaker and music critic Dream Hampton served as executive producer together with Joel Karsberg, Jesse Daniels and Tamra Simmons. Musicians Chance the Rapper, John Legend and Stephanie "Sparkle" Edwards appeared in the documentary. Its premiere episode on January 3, 2019, was Lifetime's highest-rated program in more than two years, with 2 million total viewers. It received critical acclaim, with a 95% positive rating on Rotten Tomatoes. The documentary also spurred several musicians who previously collaborated with Kelly on projects, including Lady Gaga and Ciara, to condemn Kelly and remove their works with him from streaming services.

Shortly after the docuseries aired, Kelly's final record label, RCA Records, dissolved its working relationship with him and effectively ended his career. In February 2019, Kelly was arrested and charged with 10 counts of aggravated criminal sexual abuse. In June 2022, Kelly was convicted and sentenced to 30 years in prison in connection with his sexual crimes.

A second season titled Surviving R. Kelly Part II: The Reckoning premiered on January 2, 2020. A final season titled Surviving R. Kelly: The Final Chapter premiered on January 2, 2023.

== Episodes ==
=== Series overview ===
Season	Episodes	Originally released	
Season	Episodes	First released	Last released
1	6	January 3, 2019	January 5, 2019
2	5	January 2, 2020	January 4, 2020
3	4	January 2, 2023	January 3, 2023

=== Season 1 (2019) ===
No. overall	No. in season	Title	Directed by	Written by	Original release date	US viewers (millions)
1	1	"The Pied Piper of R&B"	Nigel Bellis & Astral Finnie	Nigel Bellis & Astral Finnie	January 3, 2019	1.80
2	2	"Hiding in Plain Sight"	Nigel Bellis & Astral Finnie	Nigel Bellis & Astral Finnie	January 3, 2019	1.97
3	3	"Sex Tape Scandal"	Nigel Bellis & Astral Finnie	Nigel Bellis & Astral Finnie	January 4, 2019	2.09
4	4	"The People vs. R. Kelly"	Nigel Bellis & Astral Finnie	Nigel Bellis & Astral Finnie	January 4, 2019	2.16
5	5	"All the Missing Girls"	Nigel Bellis & Astral Finnie	Nigel Bellis & Astral Finnie	January 5, 2019	2.26
6	6	"Black Girls Matter"	Nigel Bellis & Astral Finnie	Nigel Bellis & Astral Finnie	January 5, 2019	2.29

=== Season 2: Part II: The Reckoning (2020) ===
No. overall	No. in season	Title	Directed by	Written by	Original release date	US viewers (millions)
7	1	"It Hasn't Stopped"	Nigel Bellis & Astral Finnie	Nigel Bellis & Astral Finnie	January 2, 2020	1.21
8	2	"The Settlement Factory"	Nigel Bellis & Astral Finnie	Nigel Bellis & Astral Finnie	January 2, 2020	1.14
9	3	"Please Come Forward"	Nigel Bellis & Astral Finnie	Nigel Bellis & Astral Finnie	January 3, 2020	0.81
10	4	"After the Rescue"	Nigel Bellis & Astral Finnie	Nigel Bellis & Astral Finnie	January 3, 2020	0.85
11	5	"Bring Our Girls Home"	Nigel Bellis & Astral Finnie	Nigel Bellis & Astral Finnie	January 4, 2020	0.71

=== Season 3: The Final Chapter (2023) ===
No. overall	No. in season	Title	Directed by	Written by	Original release date	US viewers (millions)
12	1	"Years in the Making"	Nigel Bellis & Astral Finnie	Nigel Bellis & Astral Finnie	January 2, 2023	N/A
13	2	"Taking a Stand"	Nigel Bellis & Astral Finnie	Nigel Bellis & Astral Finnie	January 2, 2023	N/A
14	3	"Jane Doe #1"	Nigel Bellis & Astral Finnie	Nigel Bellis & Astral Finnie	January 3, 2023	N/A
15	4	"The Verdict"	Nigel Bellis & Astral Finnie	Nigel Bellis & Astral Finnie	January 3, 2023	N/A

== Production ==
A documentary series focused on R. Kelly's history of alleged sexual abuse was green-lit by Lifetime in May 2018.

"We've been working for over a year to bring forth the stories of these women," executive producer Joel Karsberg told The Hollywood Reporter. "We are proud to team with Lifetime to shed light on these stories as well as an industry that has looked the other way for so many years."

Hampton was invited onto the project by an executive at Bunim/Murray Productions. "[...] That executive, Jesse Daniels, and Tamra Simmons, another co-EP on this project, have been holding these relationships with some of his survivors for months before I came on board," Hampton said in an interview with NPR. "I remember talking to them early on, kind of figuring out if we were going to work together...Having been adjacent in some ways to the music industry, when there was one, I knew that it took dozens, if not hundreds of people, for R. Kelly to operate as long as he has in the way that he has."

Hampton said that Simmons would call prospective interviewees late into the night. "She was handling and had the relationships with, not just the women and girls who survived R. Kelly, but also the families," Hampton said. "We had three families who were trying to get their daughters back. So she in particular, she and Jesse, had been caring for those relationships. And then I came on as showrunner and made it a show."

Many musicians who worked with R. Kelly refused to participate in the series. "When it comes to celebrities, it was incredibly difficult to get people who had collaborated (artistically) with Kelly to come forward," Hampton said. "We asked Lady Gaga. We asked Erykah Badu. We asked Celine Dion. We asked Jay-Z. We asked Dave Chappelle. (They're) people who have been critical of him." Hampton specifically praised John Legend for appearing in the documentary.

== Reception ==
=== Critical response ===
The review aggregator website Rotten Tomatoes reported a 95% approval rating for the first season with an average rating of 8.19/10, based on 21 reviews. The website's critical consensus reads, "By unearthing previously suppressed histories, Surviving R. Kelly exposes the dangers of enabling predatory behavior and gives necessary voice to its survivors." Metacritic, which uses a weighted average, assigned a score of 86 out of 100 based on nine critics, indicating "universal acclaim".

=== Ratings ===
==== Season 1 ====
The January 3 premiere episode was Lifetime's highest-rated program in more than two years, with 1.9 million total viewers.

Viewership and ratings per episode of Surviving R. Kelly
No.	Title	Air date	Rating (18–49)	Viewers (millions)	DVR (18–49)	DVR viewers (millions)	Total (18–49)	Total viewers (millions)
1	"The Pied Piper of R&B"	January 3, 2019	0.8	1.80	0.9	1.54	1.7	3.35
2	"Hiding in Plain Sight"	January 3, 2019	0.9	1.97	0.8	1.46	1.7	3.44
3	"Sex Tape Scandal"	January 4, 2019	0.9	2.09	0.9	1.53	1.8	3.64
4	"The People vs. R. Kelly"	January 4, 2019	0.9	2.16	1.0	1.68	1.9	3.85
5	"All the Missing Girls"	January 5, 2019	0.9	2.26	0.9	1.57	1.8	3.84
6	"Black Girls Matter"	January 5, 2019	1.0	2.29	0.9	1.67	1.9	3.98

==== Season 2 ====
Viewership and ratings per episode of Surviving R. Kelly
No.	Title	Air date	Rating (18–49)	Viewers (millions)	DVR (18–49)	DVR viewers (millions)	Total (18–49)	Total viewers (millions)
1	"Part II: The Reckoning: It Hasn't Stopped"	January 2, 2020	0.4	1.21	TBD	TBD	TBD	TBD
2	"Part II: The Reckoning: The Settlement Factory"	January 2, 2020	0.4	1.14	TBD	TBD	TBD	TBD
3	"Part II: The Reckoning: Please Come Forward"	January 3, 2020	0.3	0.81	TBD	TBD	TBD	TBD
4	"Part II: The Reckoning: After the Rescue"	January 3, 2020	0.4	0.86	TBD	TBD	TBD	TBD
5	"Part II: The Reckoning: Bring Our Girls Home"	January 4, 2020	0.3	0.71	TBD	TBD	TBD	TBD

==== Season 3 ====
Viewership and ratings per episode of Surviving R. Kelly
No.	Title	Air date	Rating (18–49)	Viewers (millions)	DVR (18–49)	DVR viewers (millions)	Total (18–49)	Total viewers (millions)
1	"The Final Chapter: Years in the Making"	January 2, 2023	0.09	0.445	TBD	TBD	TBD	TBD
2	"The Final Chapter: Taking a Stand"	January 2, 2023	0.08	0.393	TBD	TBD	TBD	TBD
3	"The Final Chapter: Jane Doe #1"	January 3, 2023	0.08	0.312	TBD	TBD	TBD	TBD
4	"The Final Chapter: The Verdict"	January 3, 2023	0.08	0.299	TBD	TBD	TBD	TBD

=== Impact ===
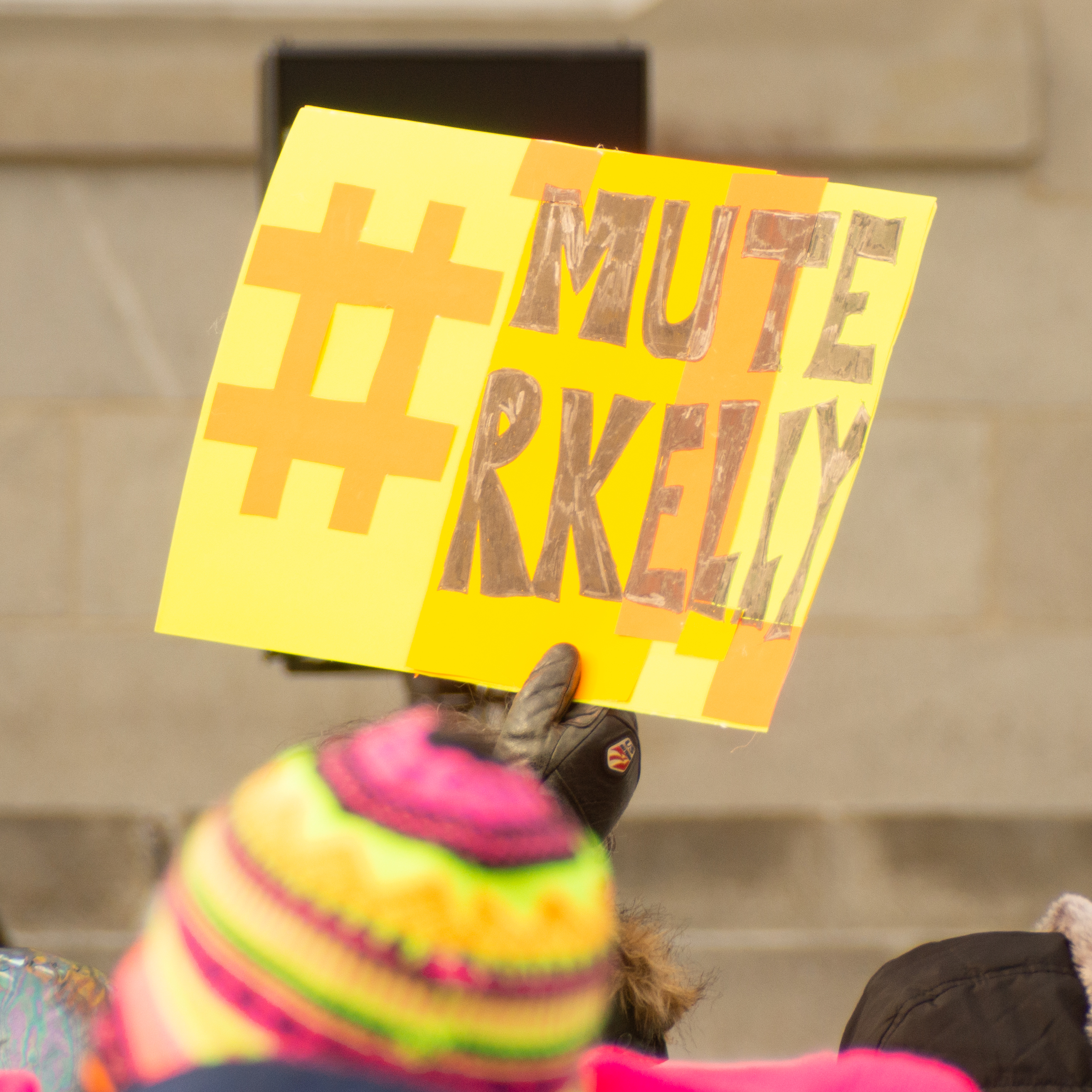
2019 Women's March in Concord, New Hampshire

The National Sexual Assault Hotline in the United States, operated by the Rape, Abuse & Incest National Network (RAINN), experienced a 27% increase in calls during the airing of the documentary and a 40% increase following the airing.

Following the documentary, the office of Cook County, Illinois, State's Attorney Kim Foxx said on January 10, 2019, that it had received numerous new calls alleging sexual abuse by R. Kelly and that it was investigating the claims. Lady Gaga also released a statement saying she regretted working with R. Kelly on their 2013 duet "Do What U Want" and said she was working on removing it from online streaming services. "I stand behind these women 1000%, believe them, know they are suffering and in pain, and feel strongly that their voices should be heard and taken seriously", she wrote in a statement. "I think it's clear how explicitly twisted my thinking was at the time...If I could go back and have a talk with my younger self I'd tell her to go through the therapy I have since then." Other artists that have previously worked and collaborated with Kelly as well, such as Chance the Rapper, Celine Dion, Jennifer Hudson, and Ciara, also took down their respective songs with him from music streaming services and retailers.

Nielsen SoundScan has reported that after the initial airing of the series, Kelly's music saw a two-fold increase in streaming popularity. But, in contrast, after the series aired, many urban contemporary radio stations – where R. Kelly was a mainstay – in various markets have decided they would no longer play his music. Stations like KKDA-FM and KRNB in Dallas, KJLH in Los Angeles, WBLS in New York City, and WAMJ in Atlanta have made the announcement they will not play R. Kelly's music anymore, while other radio stations that quietly banned his music did not make a public announcement on their decision.

Kelly's record label, RCA Records, terminated his contract shortly after the docuseries aired. On February 22, 2019, the Cook County State's Attorney's Office in Illinois charged Kelly with 10 counts of aggravated criminal sexual abuse. On March 6, 2019, Gayle King interviewed Kelly on CBS This Morning. Kelly insisted on his innocence and blamed social media for the allegations. During the interview, Kelly had an emotional outburst where he stood up, pounded his chest, and yelled.

=== Awards ===
Surviving R. Kelly won a Peabody Award in the Documentary category.
