= Lena McLin =

American music teacher and composer (1928–2023)

- A Kenwood Academy yearbook photo of McLin, 1980s.
- Born: Lena Mae Johnson; September 5, 1928; Atlanta, Georgia, U.S.
- Died: October 3, 2023 (aged 95); Chicago, Illinois, U.S.
- Education: Spelman College; American Conservatory of Music
- Occupations: Music educator; composer; author; pastor
- Years active: 1955–2023
- Family: Thomas A. Dorsey (uncle)

Lena Mae McLin (née Johnson; September 5, 1928 – October 3, 2023) was an American educator, composer, author, and pastor, who served as a music teacher in the Chicago Public Schools system. Beginning her teaching career in the 1960s, her most notable tenure was her time at Kenwood Academy. McLin served as head of the music department at Kenwood from 1969 until 2004.

== Early life ==
Lena Mae Johnson was born in Atlanta, Georgia, on September 5, 1928. At the age of five she was sent to live with her uncle, Thomas A. Dorsey. She attended the Pilgrim Baptist Church as a child, where she was exposed to gospel music and served as an accompanist to her uncle's choir. McLin had a bachelor's degree in music, specializing in piano and violin, from Spelman College, and a graduate degree in music from the American Conservatory of Music.

== Career ==
=== Teaching ===
McLin taught in Chicago at Hubbard High School, Harlan High School, and Kenwood Academy. At Kenwood she taught Mandy Patinkin, Deitra Farr, and Kim English. Her other students included R. Kelly, Tammy McCann, Chaka Khan, Da Brat, Mark Rucker, Robert Sims, and Jennifer Hudson. She was called "the woman who launched a thousand careers" by art critic Howard Reich of the Chicago Tribune.

R. Kelly stated that it was McLin that convinced him to pursue a career in music over basketball, that he considers McLin his "second mother", and that she has remained an influence in his career continuously since his high-school days. With her encouragement, R. Kelly wrote his first song, about poverty in Africa.

McLin officially retired from teaching high school in the mid-1990s but continued teaching voice lessons. She taught for 36 years, all at Chicago area public schools. She has also given lectures at the Peabody Institute.

McLin published the book Pulse: A History Of Music in 1977. She also has a library of choral works published by the Neil A. Kjos Music Company.

=== Music ===
McLin founded the McLin Ensemble in the 1950s, during which time she was serving as the public relations director of the Park District Opera Guild. She and the ensemble made their operatic debut in November 1960 at the Abraham Lincoln Center in Chicago, with a performance of The Cloak.

McLin and her husband Nathanael also founded the McLin Opera Company in the mid-1950s, funded with their own money. The company was named the "nation's leading small opera company" by the Washington Afro-American in 1965. Under her direction the company performed on stage, as well as on radio and television networks.

Her own opera, Oh Freedom, was played at Carnegie Hall in 1983.

McLin composed a wide range of music, including cantatas, masses, and rock operas. Her work has built from both European classical traditions and tradition African-American music, and "works large and small that, in essence, merged European and African-American languages", according to Reich. She also fronted the gospel group Lena McLin & the McLin Singers. In all, she has composed more than 400 cantatas, masses, solo and choral arrangements of spirituals, anthems, art songs, gospel songs, rock operas, soul and pop songs, works for piano and orchestra, and electronic music arrangements, including Free at Last: A Portrait Of Martin Luther King Jr. and Gwendolyn Brooks: A Musical Portrait.

In 2011 a tribute to her musical career was held at the Emmanuel Baptist Church. She was an honoree of the Human Symphony's Foundation living legends award in 2007.

== Religious service ==
In a resolution passed by the Illinois House of Representatives in 2008, the House stated that:

"Prompted by a calling from God on August 9, 1981, Lena McLin started a bible class in a small meeting room in the Conrad Hilton Hotel in downtown Chicago; during the next several months, Dr. McLin fervently studied the Holy Bible and attended divinity training classes and on February 26, 1982, Dr. McLin was officially ordained as a minister; the bible classes became services as Holy Vessel Baptist Church, and Dr. McLin was the pastor and the Minister of Music; and [o]nce established at a permanent address, Dr. McLin implemented outreach programs to help the Hyde Park community; the church began providing food, clothing, bus and train fares, temporary shelter, and Christian counseling to distressed men, women, and children; in 2008, Holy Vessel celebrated its 27th anniversary, and Dr. McLin celebrated her 26th anniversary as an ordained minister of God."

== Personal life ==
McLin had two children, Nathanael Jr. and Beverley, with her husband Nathanael McLin.

In 2008 the Illinois House of Representatives adopted a resolution "that we congratulate Reverend Doctor Lena J. McLin on this momentous occasion and wish her continued health, happiness, and music in her life" upon the occasion of her 80th birthday.

McLin was awarded honorary degrees by the Virginia Union University and Spelman College. She was also a 2003 recipient of the lifetime achievement award from the Chicago Music Awards.

=== Death ===
Lena McLin died on October 3, 2023, at the age of 95.
