= Andrea Kelly =

American choreographer, dancer, and actress (born 1974)

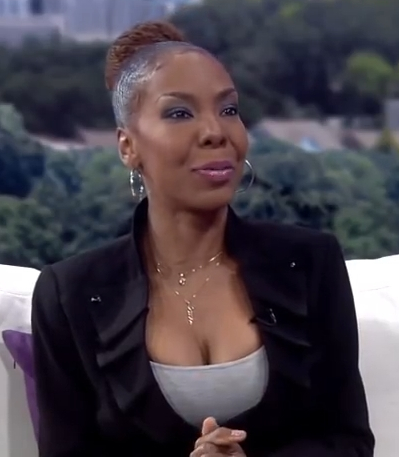
- Kelly in June 2018
- Born: Andrea Danyell Lee; January 28, 1974 (age 52); Chicago, Illinois, U.S.
- Other name: Drea
- Occupations: Dancer; choreographer; actress
- Years active: 1994–present
- Spouses: R. Kelly (m. 1996; div. 2009); Brian McKee (m. 2014; div. 2014)
- Children: 3

Andrea Danyell Kelly (née Lee, January 28, 1974), known professionally as Drea, is an American choreographer, dancer, and actress. She is the second ex-wife of singer-songwriter R. Kelly.

== Background and personal life ==
Andrea Danyell Lee was born in Chicago, Illinois, on January 28, 1974.

In 1996, Drea, then aged 22, married singer–songwriter R. Kelly in Colorado. Prior to their marriage, Drea was a backup dancer for Kelly. Together Drea and Kelly have three children. Drea changed her last name from Lee to Kelly. Drea filed a restraining order against Kelly in September 2005 after he allegedly assaulted her when she told him she wanted a divorce. Kelly filed for divorce from Lee in 2006; it was finalized in 2009, both parties signed an NDA and Lee was given an undisclosed amount of money for alimony.

In 2014, Drea married 36-year-old barber and R&B singer Brian McKee, whom she divorced after just two months of marriage after allegations surfaced that he was having an affair.

In 2018, Drea revealed on talk show The View that R. Kelly emotionally and physically abused her throughout their marriage. She stated the abuse became so severe that she contemplated suicide. Drea detailed an incident where Kelly assaulted her in the back of his Hummer, and as a result she has PTSD. Another time, Kelly "hogtied" her in bed, raped her, and fell asleep while she was still tied. She stated her motive for speaking out many years after their divorce as being to help other victims of domestic violence.

== Filmography ==
=== Film ===
Year	Title	Role	Notes
2013	The Big Dirty List Show: 50 Years of Sex and Music	Herself	Documentary
2015	Before "I Do"	Breanna Taylor	
2015	Chocolate City	Dance Instructor	Cameo

=== Television ===
Year	Title	Role	Notes
2012	Big Morning Buzz Live with Carrie Keagan	Herself	Talk-show
2012–2014	Hollywood Exes	Herself	
2013–2014	Bethenny	Herself	4 Episodes
2015	Between The Sheet With Drea Kelly	Herself (host)	Talk-show
2017	Xscape: Still Kickin It!	Herself	4 Episodes
2019	Growing Up Hip Hop: Atlanta	Herself	10 Episodes
2019	Surviving R. Kelly	Herself	6 Episodes

== Videography ==
=== Cameo appearances ===
Year	Music video	Director(s)
1994	"Summer Bunnies (Remix)" R. Kelly	Unknown
1995	"You Remind Me of Something" R. Kelly	David Nelson
2003	"Thoia Thoing" R. Kelly	Little X

== Books ==
#	Title	Year	Type	Note
1	Life Under the Red Carpet: My Life as R. Kelly's Wife	—N/a	Autobiography	
