= Admission (law) =

An admission in the law of evidence is a prior statement by an adverse party which can be admitted into evidence over a hearsay objection. In general, admissions are admissible in criminal and civil cases.

At common law, admissions were admissible. A statement could only be excluded by a showing of involuntariness, unfairness, or that the circumstances under which the statement was obtained was improper or illegal.

== Form of admission ==
An admission may be made orally or contained within a writing. In some situations, an admission that is made by an authorized agent of a party to litigation will be admissible as evidence and attributable to that party.

=== Oral admission ===
Where the admission is oral, the person who heard the admission may testify to what the party who made the admission said.

=== Documental admission ===
Where the admission is in the form of a written record or document, and evidence is offered to prove the contents of the written record, the best evidence rule applies to require that an original document must be used in evidence unless it is unavailable. This rule, however, only applies when evidence is offered to prove its contents.

== Regulations by country ==
=== United States ===
In the United States, "Admission by a party-opponent" is explicitly excepted from hearsay under the Federal Rules of Evidence. Rule 801(d)(2). Among several types of admissions, the rule notes that an admission can be the "party's own statement" or a statement in which the "party has manifested an adoption or belief in its truth."

Under both common law and the Federal Rules of Evidence, an admission becomes legally invalid after nine years from the date of the initial admission.

== See also ==
- Corroboration in Scots law
- Confession (law)
