= Public Announcement discography =

- Studio albums: 4
- Singles: 10
- Music videos: 8

This is a comprehensive listing of all releases by Public Announcement, a R&B dance group from Chicago, Illinois, United States. They released their self-titled debut album, Born into the 90's, in January 1992 with fellow R&B singer R. Kelly. It featured the singles "She's Got That Vibe", "Honey Love", and "Slow Dance (Hey Mr. DJ)". The album charted at #42 on the all-genre Billboard 200 and #1 on the Top R&B/Hip-Hop Albums chart. The group's second album, All Work, No Play, was released in March 1998. However, it only managed to peak at #81 on the Billboard 200, despite the album's first single, Body Bumpin' (Yippie-Yi-Yo) went to #5 on the Billboard Hot 100.

Public Announcement has released ten singles to radio, eight music videos, and four studio albums.

== Albums ==
List of albums, with selected chart positions, and certifications
Title	Album details	Peak chart positions					Sales	Certifications
Title	Album details	US	US R&B/HH	FRA	NED	UK	Sales	Certifications
Born into the 90's (with R. Kelly)	Released: January 14, 1992; Formats: CD, cassette, digital download; Label: Jive (41469-2)	42	1	79	49	67	World: 2,000,000; US: 1,500,000	RIAA: Platinum
All Work, No Play	Released: March 24, 1998; Formats: CD, cassette; Label: A&M	81	14	—	—	—		
Don't Hold Back	Released: February 6, 2001; Formats: CD, cassette, digital download; Label: RCA	89	30	—	—	—		
When the Smoke Clears	Released: October 25, 2006; Formats: CD, cassette, digital download; Label: Boss Entertainment	—	98	—	—	—		

== Singles ==
Year	Title	Peak Chart Positions								Album
Year	Title	US	US R&B	AUS	NZ	NED	BEL (FLA)	GER	UK	Album
1991	"She's Got That Vibe"	59	7	28	19	15	50	—	57	Born into the '90s (as R. Kelly & Public Announcement)
1992	"Honey Love"	39	1	—	—	52	—	—	—	Born into the '90s (as R. Kelly & Public Announcement)
1992	"Slow Dance (Hey Mr. DJ)" (US only)	43	1	—	—	—	—	—	—	Born into the '90s (as R. Kelly & Public Announcement)
1993	"Dedicated" (US only)	31	9	—	—	—	—	—	—	Born into the '90s (as R. Kelly & Public Announcement)
1993	"Hey Love (Can I Have a Word)" (as Mr. Lee feat. R. Kelly)	101	15	—	23	—	—	—	—	Born into the '90s (as R. Kelly & Public Announcement)
1994	"She's Got That Vibe" (UK reissue, credited to R. Kelly only)	—	—	—	—	—	—	—	3	Born into the '90s (as R. Kelly & Public Announcement)
1998	"Body Bumpin' (Yippie-Yi-Yo)"	5	4	—	11	—	—	—	38	All Work, No Play
1998	"It's About Time" (promo only)	—	—	—	—	—	—	—	—	All Work, No Play
2000	"Mamacita"	39	7	—	—	—	—	76	—	Don't Hold Back
2001	"Man Ain't Supposed To Cry" (US promo only)	—	35	—	—	—	—	—	—	Don't Hold Back
2001	"John Doe" (US only)	95	32	—	—	—	—	—	—	Don't Hold Back
"—" denotes releases that did not chart or were not released.

== Music videos ==
=== As a lead artist ===
Year	Music video	Director(s)
1991	"She's Got That Vibe" (with R. Kelly)	R. Kelly
1992	"Honey Love" (with R. Kelly)	Lionel C. Martin
1992	"Slow Dance (Hey Mr. DJ)" (with R. Kelly)	Unknown
1993	"Dedicated" (with R. Kelly)	Lionel C. Martin
1993	"Hey Love (Can I Have a Word)" (as Mr. Lee feat. R. Kelly)	Unknown
1998	"Body Bumpin' (Yippie-Yi-Yo)"	Unknown
1998	"It's About Time"	Unknown
2000	"Mamacita"	Unknown
2001	"Man Ain't Supposed To Cry"	Unknown
