= The Buffet Tour =

2016 concert tour by R. Kelly

- Tour by R. Kelly
- Promotional poster for the tour
- Associated album: The Buffet
- Start date: April 29, 2016
- End date: November 13, 2016
- Legs: 2
- No. of shows: 37 in North America

R. Kelly concert chronology
- Black Panties Tour (2014-15); The Buffet Tour (2016); 12 Nights of Christmas Tour (2016)

The Buffet Tour is the twelfth and final concert tour by American recording artist R. Kelly. The tour supported his thirteenth studio album, The Buffet (2015). The tour played over 30 concerts in the United States.

== Background ==
The tour was announced March 2016 by various music publications, including Billboard. Kelly referred to his tour as his most ambitious production. The tour was quickly met with controversy as the students and faculty of Saint Louis University boycotted Kelly's concert, to be held at the Chaifetz Arena on April 29, 2016. A Change.org petition was created to have the concert cancelled, citing Kelly's troubled career. The concert was quickly moved to the suburb of St. Charles at the Family Arena.

The debut concert featured Kelly performing for nearly four hours and featured various skits making light of his criminal past. Intended to be a 40 city tour, many shows were canceled, citing the elaborate production and Kelly's fear of flying as reasons. The tour is believed to have earned nearly $50 million.

== Critical reception ==
The tour was met with mixed reactions from many music critics. They unanimously cited the shows felt disorganized, with the setlist being too "loose". Kenya Vaughn (The St. Louis American) called this disjointed, stating: "This particular portion of the show was almost an R. Kelly overdose thanks to the lack of focus and the emphasis on quantity instead of a masterful delivery on songs selected for maximum impact. The show had grown boring until he [re-]positioned himself to the middle of the arena for a brief set that included a tribute to Prince. As he continues to shape the show, he should consider narrowing the focus of the show—hopefully into something that looks more like his grown and sexy incarnation that he closed the show with."

In Kansas City, Timothy Finn (The Kansas City Star) found the concert to be odd. He continued to say: "There was a live band onstage, but it was swept into the corner, shrouded by darkness, and its performances sounded secondary to the other music and sounds coming off the stage. They brought to a close a show that, though wandering and reckless at times, sated the appetites of fans who came to indulge in the libidinous sounds of one of pop music's more mercurial, prolific and controversial stars."

The show in Tampa, reviewed by Jay Cridlin (Tampa Bay Times) states: "All of these moments screamed R. Kelly – silly, sexy, soulful and at times very, very strange. Over the course of his two-hour concert, these moments kept right on coming, one after the next, eventually sketching out a portrait of one of R&B's greatest and most mystifying performers, in all his freaktacular glory."

The same sentiments were felt by Liz Tracy (Miami New Times) for the show in Miami. She says: "If it wasn't clear before, Kelly can sing. The crowd was reciting the lyrics all along, writhing in sonic ecstasy, but at the end, they were just in it to win it. [...] It's clear Kelly will never outrun his own demons. They are too thick to sidestep. But he'll take what he can get, rejoicing for now in being purged clean of his sins in his own mind and in the minds of his loyal followers."

== Opening acts ==
- Demetria McKinney (Leg 1)
- June's Diary (Leg 2)

== Setlist ==
The following setlist was obtained from the concert held on April 29, 2016, at the Family Arena in St. Charles, Missouri. It does not represent all concerts for the duration of the tour.

1. "Video Sequence"
2. "My Story"
3. "Make It Rain" / "We Been On" / "Hotel" / "So Sexy" / "Wonderful" / "That's That" / "Go Getta" / "Thoia Thoing" / "Snake" / "Get This Money" / "Gigolo" / "Fuck You Tonight"
4. "Home Alone"
5. "Legs Shakin'"
6. "Video Sequence"
7. "Sex Me" / "The Zoo" / "Slow Wind" / "Half on a Baby" / "In the Kitchen" / "Strip For You" / "Number One" / "Cookie"
8. "Ignition (Remix)" / "Fiesta (Remix)" / "I'm a Flirt (Remix)" / "Freaky In The Club"
9. "Your Body's Callin'" / "It Seems Like You're Ready" / "12 Play"
10. "Slow Dance (Hey Mr. DJ)" / "Honey Love"
11. "Down Low (Nobody Has to Know)" / "It Seems Like You're Ready" / "You Remind Me of Something" / "Feelin' on Yo Booty" / "Bump N' Grind"
12. "Video Sequence"
13. "I Wish" / "When a Woman's Fed Up" / "Contagious"
14. "Purple Rain"
15. "I Believe I Can Fly"
16. "A Change Is Gonna Come"
17. "When a Woman Loves"

Encore

19. "Happy People"
20. "Step in the Name of Love (Remix)"

== Tour dates ==
Date	City	Country	Venue
North America
April 29, 2016	St. Charles	United States	Family Arena
April 30, 2016	Kansas City	United States	Sprint Center
May 7, 2016	Rosemont	United States	Allstate Arena
May 26, 2016	Jacksonville	United States	Jacksonville Veterans Memorial Arena
May 27, 2016	Tampa	United States	Amalie Arena
May 28, 2016	Miami	United States	American Airlines Arena
June 2, 2016	Houston	United States	Toyota Center
June 3, 2016	Dallas	United States	American Airlines Center
June 4, 2016	Oklahoma City	United States	Cox Convention Center Arena
June 9, 2016	Charlotte	United States	Time Warner Cable Arena
June 10, 2016	Greensboro	United States	Greensboro Coliseum
June 11, 2016	Atlanta	United States	Philips Arena
June 16, 2016	Columbus	United States	Columbus Civic Center
June 18, 2016	Bossier City	United States	CenturyLink Center
June 19, 2016	New Orleans	United States	Smoothie King Center
June 23, 2016	Cincinnati	United States	U.S. Bank Arena
June 24, 2016	Detroit	United States	Joe Louis Arena
June 25, 2016	Cleveland	United States	Wolstein Center
July 9, 2016	Denver	United States	Bellco Theatre
September 2, 2016	South Bend	United States	Morris Performing Arts Center
September 3, 2016	Grand Rapids	United States	DeVos Performance Hall
September 8, 2016	Indianapolis	United States	Bankers Life Fieldhouse
September 10, 2016	Louisville	United States	KFC Yum! Center
September 16, 2016	Birmingham	United States	Legacy Arena
September 17, 2016	Memphis	United States	FedExForum
September 29, 2016	Albany	United States	Palace Theatre
September 30, 2016	Philadelphia	United States	Wells Fargo Center
October 1, 2016	Baltimore	United States	Royal Farms Arena
October 6, 2016	Boston	United States	TD Garden
October 7, 2016	Bridgeport	United States	Webster Bank Arena
October 8, 2016	Newark	United States	Prudential Center
October 21, 2016	Phoenix	United States	Talking Stick Resort Arena
October 22, 2016	Los Angeles	United States	Microsoft Theater
October 27, 2016	West Valley City	United States	Maverik Center
October 29, 2016	Portland	United States	Veterans Memorial Coliseum
October 30, 2016	Everett	United States	Xfinity Arena
November 13, 2016	Washington, D.C.	United States	Verizon Center

Cancellations and rescheduled shows

April 21, 2016	Cincinnati, Ohio	U.S. Bank Arena	Rescheduled to June 23, 2016
April 22, 2016	Detroit, Michigan	Joe Louis Arena	Rescheduled to June 24, 2016
April 23, 2016	Cleveland, Ohio	Wolstein Center	Rescheduled to June 25, 2016
April 27, 2016	Birmingham, Alabama	Legacy Arena	Rescheduled to September 16, 2016
April 29, 2016	St. Louis, Missouri	Chaifetz Arena	Moved to the Family Arena in St. Charles, Missouri
May 6, 2016	Indianapolis, Indiana	Bankers Life Fieldhouse	Rescheduled to September 8, 2016
May 8, 2016	Louisville, Kentucky	KFC Yum! Center	Rescheduled to September 10, 2016
May 11, 2016	West Valley City, Utah	Maverik Center	Rescheduled to October 27, 2016
May 13, 2016	Portland, Oregon	Veterans Memorial Coliseum	Rescheduled to October 29, 2016
May 14, 2016	Everett, Washington	Xfinity Arena	Rescheduled to October 30, 2016
October 16, 2016	San Diego, California	Valley View Casino Center	Cancelled
October 19, 2016	Oakland, California	Oracle Arena	Cancelled
October 28, 2016	Norfolk, Virginia	Chrysler Hall	Cancelled

=== Box office score data ===
Venue	City	Tickets sold / Available	Gross revenue
Amalie Arena	Tampa	3,576 / 6,796 (53%)	$301,379
American Airlines Center	Dallas	6,430 / 7,957 (81%)	$508,778
Philips Arena	Atlanta	10,099 / 11,875 (85%)	$809,371
Morris Performing Arts Center	South Bend	1,729 / 2,555 (68%)	$145,108
Wells Fargo Center	Philadelphia	5,192 / 8,423 (62%)	$317,192
Verizon Center	Washington, D.C.	4,899 / 12,791 (38%)	$445,101
TOTAL		31,925 / 49,797 (64%)	$2,526,929
