= All of Us (disambiguation) =

All of Us is a 2003 American sitcom.

All of Us may also refer to:

== Music ==
- All of Us, a New Zealand supergroup that produced "Sailing Away"
- All of Us (album), a 1968 album by the late 60s psychedelic pop band Nirvana
- All of Us (EP), a 2018 EP by June's Diary
- "All of Us'" (Fireboy DML song) a 2022 song by Fireboy DML
- "All of Us" (June's Diary song), a 2016 song by June's Diary
- "All of Us" (Pnau song), a 2019 single by Pnau

== Other uses ==
- All of Us (film), 2019 Belgian film
- All of Us (initiative), a project run by the US National Institutes of Health
- All of Us (play), a 2022 play by Francesca Martinez
- Kulanu, an Israeli political party whose name translates as "All of Us"

== See also ==
- All About Us (disambiguation)
- All for Us
- All of Us in Our Night, a 2008 album by Modern Skirts
- All of Us Strangers, a 2023 British film
