= Mamacita (Public Announcement song) =

2000 song by Public Announcement

Single by Public Announcement

from the album Don't Hold Back and All About the Benjamins soundtrack
- Released: December 5, 2000
- Recorded: 2000
- Genre: R&B, Dance
- Length: 3:47
- Label: Epic
- Songwriters: Gromyko Collins, Travon Potts
- Producer: Travon Potts

Public Announcement singles chronology
"Body Bumpin' (Yippie-Yi-Yo)" (1998)	"Mamacita" (2000)	"John Doe" (2001)

"Mamacita" a song by American R&B group Public Announcement. It was released as the first single from their third studio album Don't Hold Back (2000). It became Public Announcement last top 40 charting song on the US Hot 100 chart where it peaked at No. 39. The song gives a shout out to singer-songwriter R. Kelly's hit song Bump N' Grind from the album 12 Play.

== Music video ==
The video is directed by Public Announcement and is one of the last music videos by the group.

== Formats and track listings ==
- Digital download
1. "Mamacita" – 3:47

== Credits and personnel ==
Credits adapted from AllMusic.

- Public Announcement – Primary Artist
- Gromyko Collins, Travon Potts– Composer, Vocals
- Ace – Vocals

== Charts ==
=== Weekly charts ===
Chart (2000)	Peak position
US Billboard Hot 100	39
US Hot R&B/Hip-Hop Songs (Billboard)	7
US Rhythmic (Billboard)	22

=== Year-end charts ===
Chart (2001)	Position
US Hot R&B/Hip-Hop Songs (Billboard)	91
