= All About the Benjamins (soundtrack) =

All About the Benjamins Original Motion Picture Soundtrack

Soundtrack album by Various artists
- Released: February 19, 2002
- Recorded: 2001–2002
- Genres: Hip hop; R&B
- Length: 51:07
- Label: New Line
- Producers: Buckwild; Chris Stokes; Christopher Stewart; Cool & Dre; Esmond Edwards; Gamble and Huff; Mannie Fresh; Mike City; The Angel; Travon Potts; Troy Johnson

Singles from All About the Benjamins
- 1. "It's All About the Benjamins" Released: June 30, 1997; 2. "Bling Bling" Released: March 30, 1999; 3. "Mamacita" Released: December 5, 2000; 4. "Hi-Lo" Released: 2001; 5. "Told Y'all" Released: February 19, 2002

Professional ratings
Review scores
Source	Rating
AllMusic	3/5 stars

All About the Benjamins: Original Motion Picture Soundtrack is the soundtrack to Kevin Bray's 2002 action-comedy film All About the Benjamins. It was released on February 19, 2002 through New Line Records, and features hip hop and R&B music. The album peaked at #65 on the Billboard 200, #12 on the Top R&B/Hip-Hop Albums, #3 on the Independent Albums and #7 on the Top Soundtracks, and featured one charting single, "Told Y'all" by Trina and Rick Ross.

== Track listing ==
No.	Title	Producer(s)	Length
1.	"Told Y'all" (Trina featuring Rick Ross)	Cool & Dre	3:19
2.	"Tha Come Up" (Petey Pablo featuring Sunshine Anderson)	Mike City	3:46
3.	"Cream Cheese" (Mýa)		3:12
4.	"It's All About the Benjamins" (Puff Daddy featuring Notorious B.I.G., Lil' Kim and The L.O.X.)	Deric "D-Dot" Angelettie	4:38
5.	"Dime, Quarter, Nickel, Penny" (Nappy Roots)	Troy Johnson	3:49
6.	"Bling Bling" (Hot Boys and Big Tymers)	Mannie Fresh	5:12
7.	"For the Love of Money" (The O'Jays)	Gamble and Huff	3:43
8.	"Money All the Time" (F.T. and M.A.F.I.A.)	Buckwild	4:51
9.	"Hi-Lo" (JT Money and Solé)	Christopher Stewart	4:08
10.	"Mamacita" (Public Announcement)	Travon Potts	3:45
11.	"Destiny Complete" (The Angel and Mystic)	The Angel	4:18
12.	"Tears" (IMx)	Chris Stokes	3:18
13.	"Hard Work" (John Handy)	Esmond Edwards	3:14
Total length:			51:07

== Charts ==
Chart (2002)	Peak position
US Billboard 200	65
US Top R&B/Hip-Hop Albums (Billboard)	12
US Independent Albums (Billboard)	3
US Top Soundtracks (Billboard)	7
