= Frank Gatson Jr. =

American director and choreographer

- Born: October 4 Louisiana (born); Milwaukee, Wisconsin (origin)
- Education: University of Wisconsin, Madison (BA); University of Wisconsin, Milwaukee (MA)
- Occupations: Creative director, director, choreographer, manager
- Years active: 1980s–present
- Career
- Former groups: Alvin Ailey American Dance Theater, Broadway Dance Center, Up with People and Alpha Phi Alpha Inc.

Frank Gatson Jr. is an American director and choreographer. He is the creative director for En Vogue, Brandy, Muni Long, Tyrese Gibson, Rihanna and Jennifer Lopez. He also is Kelly Rowland's and Beyoncé's main creative director and choreographer, a position he has held since their tenure with Destiny's Child. He has also choreographed videos, routines and live performances for other artists including R. Kelly, Michael Jackson, TLC, En Vogue, Rihanna, Jennifer Lopez, Fifth Harmony, Destiny's Child, Little Mix, Toni Braxton and Usher.

== Early career ==
Gatson graduated from the University of Wisconsin–Madison in 1980 and began dancing for Up with People, an organization that performing at various types of venues, including several Super Bowl halftime performances. Eventually, he worked his way up to official dance captain and began to manage the show itself. He later moved to New York to study at the Broadway Dance Center and Alvin Ailey Dance Center. After finishing his time at Ailey and Broadway Centers he returned to the University of Wisconsin-Milwaukee and received a master's degree in Theatre and Dance. He received his first professional break when he danced in Michael Jackson's "Smooth Criminal" video in 1988.

In 2016, Gatson hosted BET's Chasing Destiny alongside Kelly Rowland. The pair formed an R&B girl group called June's Diary which he managed. He was the manager for Luke James and Tyrese Gibson. Additionally, he served as choreographer for Disney's animated film Hercules, providing choreography for The Muses.

== Work with En Vogue ==
=== Music videos ===
1992	"Giving Him Something He Can Feel" (as choreographer)
1992	"Free Your Mind" (as choreographer)
1993	"Runaway Love" (as choreographer)
1994	"Whatta Man" (featuring En Vogue) (as choreographer)
1996	"Don't Let Go (Love)" (as creative director)
1997	"Whatever" (as choreographer)
1997	"Too Gone, Too Long" (as creative director)
2000	"Riddle" (as creative director)

== Work with R. Kelly ==
=== Music videos ===
2008	"Skin" (as choreographer)
2012	"Feelin' Single" (as choreographer and dancer)

=== Tours and live performances ===
- Down Low Top Secret Tour (1996) (as director and choreographer)
- 39th Annual Grammy Awards (1998) (as choreographer)
- Get Up on a Room Tour (1999) (as director and choreographer)
- No Way Out Tour with Puff Daddy (1998) (as director and choreographer)
- TP-2.COM Tour (2001) (as choreographer)
- 2005 MTV Video Music Awards (2005) (as choreographer)
- 2015 Soul Train Music Awards (2015) (as choreographer)
- The Buffet Tour (2016) (as director and choreographer)

== Work with Beyoncé ==
=== Music videos ===
2003	"Crazy in Love" (featuring Jay-Z) (as choreographer)
2003	"Baby Boy" (featuring Sean Paul) (as choreographer)
2003	"Me, Myself and I" (as choreographer)
2005	"Check on It" (featuring Slim Thug & Bun B) (as choreographer)
2006	"Ring the Alarm" (as choreographer)
2006	"Green Light" (as choreographer)
2006	"Irreplaceable" (as choreographer)
2006	"Upgrade U" (featuring Jay-Z) (as choreographer)
2007	"Suga Mama" (as choreographer)
2007	"Freakum Dress" (as choreographer)
2009	"Ego" (as director, creative director and choreographer)
2009	"Single Ladies (Put a Ring on It)" (as creative director and choreographer)
2009	"If I Were a Boy" (as a choreographer)
2009	"Diva" (as a choreographer)
2011	"Move Your Body" (as choreographer)
2011	"Run the World (Girls)" (as choreographer)
2011	"Countdown" (as choreographer)

=== Tours and live performances ===
- The Beyoncé Experience (2007) (as show director, creative director and choreographer)
- I Am... World Tour (2009) (as director, creative director and choreographer)
- Super Bowl XLVII halftime show (2013) (as creative director and choreographer)
- The Mrs. Carter Show World Tour (2013) (as director, creative director and choreographer)

=== Commercials ===
- True Star (2004)
- Samsung (2007)
- Armani Diamonds (2007)
- American Express (2007)
- L'Oréal (2007)
- L'Oréal (2003) (with Jennifer Lopez)
- Stella Rosa (2022) (with Brandy Norwood)

== Work with Usher ==
=== Music videos ===
1997	"You Make Me Wanna..." (as choreographer)
1997	"My Way" (as choreographer)
2001	"U Remind Me" (as choreographer)
2008	"Love in This Club" (as choreographer and creative director)
2008	"Moving Mountains" (as creative director)

=== Tours and live performances ===
- Share My World Tour (with Mary J. Blige) (1997) (creative director)
- No Way Out Tour (with Puff Daddy) (1997) (as choreographer)
- 8701 Promo Tour (2001) (creative director)
- One Night, One Star: Usher Live (2005) (as choreographer)

== Accolades ==
Award	Year	Category	Recipient(s)	Result
Grammy Awards	2012	Best Long Form Music Video	I Am... World Tour	Nominated
MTV Video Music Awards	1992	Best Choreography	My Lovin' (You're Never Gonna Get It)	Won
MTV Video Music Awards	1993	Best Choreography	Free Your Mind	Won
MTV Video Music Awards	1994	Best Choreography	Whatta Man	Won
MTV Video Music Awards	2003	Best Choreography	Crazy in Love	Won
MTV Video Music Awards	2004	Best Choreography	Naughty Girl	Nominated
MTV Video Music Awards	2007	Best Choreography	Beautiful Liar	Nominated
MTV Video Music Awards	2009	Best Choreography	Single Ladies (Put a Ring on It)	Won
MTV Video Music Awards	2010	Best Choreography	Video Phone (Extended Remix)	Nominated
MTV Video Music Awards	2011	Best Choreography	Run the World (Girls)	Won
MTV Video Music Awards	2012	Best Choreography	Countdown	Nominated
MTV Video Music Awards	2014	Best Choreography	Partition	Nominated
