= Pump That Body =

Pump That Body may refer to:

- Pump That Body (Mr. Lee song)
- Pump That Body (Stevie B song)
