= Gramahawk =

2011 album by Modern Skirts

Studio album by Modern Skirts
- Released: January 18, 2011
- Genre: Rock

Modern Skirts chronology
Happy 81 (2010)	Gramahawk (2011)	Tennessee (2012)

Gramahawk is the third and final full-length album released by alternative rock band Modern Skirts, released on January 18, 2011.

== Recording ==
During the recording of Gramahawk the band aimed for a fresh start. Various items were used during recording such as cassette players, electric razors, and children's toys in order to influence their style. The band recorded the album in New Orleans, Louisiana, with the help of Michael Seaman and Ben Roberts. Seaman, Roberts, and Drew Vandenberg mixed the album at Chase Park Transduction in Athens, Georgia.

== Reception ==
The Signal praised the album for its experimentation and new approach, but overall called the album 'a disappointment', stating that at times the album would at times sound 'sloppy, immature, and even abrasive'. Pitchfork described the album as a return to the genre of indie hooky rock for the band following the previous album, All of Us in Our Night, illustrating the album as a 'local charm'. Paste noted that the album is a testimony to the band's chemistry and that the album proves that the Modern Skirts have 'changed for the better'.

== Track listing ==
No.	Title	Length
1.	"Jane Child"	3:39
2.	"Happy 81"	3:40
3.	"Under Bridges and Overpasses"	3:46
4.	"Bumper Car"	3:56
5.	"Dui"	3:42
6.	"Tape Deck"	3:50
7.	"Glass of Water"	3:31
8.	"American Gothic"	3:46
9.	"Ship Shape"	3:09
10.	"To Be a Branch Davidian"	3:38
