= All of Us (EP) =

EP by June's Diary
- Released: June 30, 2018
- Genre: Contemporary R&B
- Length: 21:08
- Label: Music of Sound

June's Diary chronology
Male Edition (2017)	All of Us (2018)

All of Us is the debut extended play by American girl group June's Diary. It is their first original release after appearing on the BET docs-series Chasing Destiny. The EP was released on June 30, 2018, through the independent label Music of Sound. Lyrically, the extended play discusses themes of female empowerment, heartbreak and love. The EP also features guest appearances from American rapper Trina as well as R&B singer Jussie Smollett.

== Background ==
After the completion of Chasing Destiny, it was announced that the group would be releasing an album through Epic Records.

== Commercial performance ==
All of Us charted at number eighteen on the Billboard Heatseekers, giving the group their first ever chart entry on Billboard.

== Track listing ==
No.	Title	Length
1.	"Good Time"	3:19
2.	"Take Me"	3:52
3.	"Have You Ever"	3:37
4.	"His Phone"	2:54
5.	"All of Us feat. Trina"	4:13
6.	"Hurt People (with Jussie Smollett)"	3:13
Total length:		21:08

== Charts ==
Chart (2018)	Peak position
US Heatseekers Albums (Billboard)	18

== Release history ==
Country	Date	Format	Label
Worldwide	June 30, 2018	Digital download	Music of Sound
