= Bump n' Grind (R. Kelly song) =

1994 single by R. Kelly

Single by R. Kelly

from the album 12 Play
- B-side: "Definition of a Hotti"
- Released: January 28, 1994
- Genre: R&B; soul; New jack swing
- Length: 4:14
- Label: Jive
- Songwriter: Robert Kelly
- Producer: R. Kelly

R. Kelly singles chronology
"Sex Me" (1993)	"Bump n' Grind" (1994)	"Your Body's Callin'" (1994)

"Bump n' Grind"
R. Kelly's "Bump n' Grind" from 12 Play

"Bump n' Grind" is a song written, produced, and performed by American singer-songwriter R. Kelly. It was released on January 28, 1994 by Jive Records, as the second single from his debut solo studio album, 12 Play (1993). The track became a number one single on the US Billboard Hot 100 (temporarily interrupting the six-week run of Ace of Base's "The Sign"), and it also spent twelve weeks at number one on the US Hot R&B Songs chart as Kelly's third number-one R&B hit, becoming the longest-running number-one of 1994 in the US, and the longest-running R&B single at that time. The song also reached number eight on the UK Singles Chart, following the massive success of his previous single, "She's Got That Vibe" (which was actually a re-release).

Kelly released three versions of "Bump n' Grind": the original album version and two remixes. The original LP version was made available for airplay on urban and Top 40 pop radio stations alike at first, but eventually the "Old School" remix was issued shortly and gained massive airplay on urban, adult R&B/soul and rhythmic radio stations. Kelly also released the "Bump n' Grind (How I Feel It Extended Mix)", which was used in the original video for the song. This version received major play on urban radio as well. Some stations still played the original version until Kelly's music largely vanished from playlists leading up to and following his conviction. The song was nominated in the categories for Male R&B/soul single and R&B/soul song at the 1995 Soul Train Music Awards. It won an award for Male R&B/soul single.

== Critical reception ==
Martin Johnson from Chicago Reader wrote, "On the album's second single, 'Bump n' Grind', which caught everyone but Kelly off guard by becoming one of the biggest R&B hits of all time, he sings mostly about lust; his idea of subtlety is anguished longing, and he cradles his earthy melismata in soft, billowy backgrounds. It's as if he sought to combine the tormented craving of Marvin Gaye's 'Let's Get It On' with the sultry cool of Sade's 'Nothing Can Come Between Us'." In his weekly UK chart commentary, James Masterton felt it's "a rather slower track but certain to be boosted by his imminent arrival on these shores for a series of concerts in career boosting move that echoes the rise of Bobby Brown here in 1989." Pan-European magazine Music & Media wrote, "Tune in for Radio Erotica. On this US number 2 hit Kelly slows down his swingbeat to sex up his female fans, which he continued to do when he was live on air on Kiss 100 FM/London's breakfast show." Head of music Lindsay Wesker recalled, "The guy is absolutely wonderful, and he definitely makes no secret about his sex life. The other singles 'Sex Me' and 'Your Body's Callin'' are equally doing well here."

Music Week gave it a score of four out of five, stating that it "shows R Kelly at his slow, X-rated best. An anthem in soul circles for the past year, 'Bump and Grind' will nevertheless need strong radio support to match 'Vibe''s success." John Mulvey from NME noted, "My mind's telling me no/But my body's telling me yes, claims R Kelly, rather passionately, before sloping into a syrupy and bogus justification of his lurrrve." Ralph Tee from the Record Mirror Dance Update commented, "Less instant than 'Sex Me' but now a firm favourite from the album, R Kelly and associates beef up this raunchy ballad with extra bass drum and snare kick for a superb slow jam. Kelly also gives himself an opportunity to stretch out vocally on the tune, showcasing some impressive technique atop the infectious background harmonies. Already large in R&B circles and from an album that sounds better with every spin." In his weekly Record Mirror dance column, James Hamilton described it as a "moaning 'I don't see nothin' wrong' 65bpm groin grinder".

== Music video ==
The accompanying music video for "Bump n' Grind" did not feature the famous intro. It was filmed like a live concert performance and was directed by Kim Watson.

== Live performances ==
Kelly always performed the intro of the song at almost all events he performed in; he usually performed the "Bump N' Grind (Remix)" instead of the original at concert, despite the original single's huge success. Kelly performed the remix versions of the song on various shows in 1994, on The Arsenio Hall Show, Billboard Music Award and Soul Train.

== Charts ==
=== Weekly charts ===
Chart (1994–1995)	Peak position
Australia (ARIA)	82
Europe (Eurochart Hot 100)	35
Europe (European Dance Radio)	19
Ireland (IRMA)	26
Netherlands (Dutch Top 40 Tipparade)	10
Netherlands (Dutch Single Tip)	10
New Zealand (Recorded Music NZ)	49
Scotland (OCC)	33
UK Singles (Official Charts)	8
UK Club Chart (Music Week)	62
US Billboard Hot 100	1
US Dance Singles Sales (Billboard)	1
US Hot R&B/Hip-Hop Songs (Billboard)	1
US Pop Airplay (Billboard)	24
US Rhythmic Airplay (Billboard)	1

Chart (2013)	Peak position
UK Singles (OCC)	92

=== Year-end charts ===
Chart (1994)	Position
Brazil (Mais Tocadas)	17
US Billboard Hot 100	11
US Hot R&B Singles (Billboard)	1
US Maxi-Singles Sales (Billboard)	10
US Cash Box Top 100	31

=== Decade-end charts ===
Chart (1990–1999)	Position
US Billboard Hot 100	55

== Certifications ==
Region	Certification	Certified units/sales
New Zealand (RMNZ)	Platinum	30,000^{‡}
United Kingdom (BPI)	Platinum	600,000^{‡}
United States (RIAA)	Platinum	1,200,000
United States (RIAA) Mastertone	Gold	500,000^{*}
^{*} Sales figures based on certification alone.^{‡} Sales+streaming figures based on certification alone.

== Release history ==
Region	Date	Format(s)	Label(s)	Ref.
United States	January 28, 1994	12-inch vinyl; CD; cassette	Jive	
United Kingdom	February 14, 1994	12-inch vinyl; CD	Jive	
Australia	April 18, 1994	CD; cassette	Jive	
United Kingdom (re-release)	January 9, 1995	7-inch vinyl; 12-inch vinyl; cassette	Jive	

== Legacy ==
=== Uses in popular culture ===
- The song is used in numerous films such as Without a Paddle, American Reunion, Project X, The Wackness and Grimsby.
- The song is in the video game Grand Theft Auto IV on the radio station The Vibe 98.8.
- The song has been used in the British comedy series Gavin & Stacey, ABC Series Super Fun Night and the American adult animated sitcom American Dad!.
- Artists like Bruno Mars, B. Smyth, Bobby V, Adrian Marcel and Chris Brown have covered this song live.
- In 2013 a video went viral on social media showing an old man singing this song in his backyard.

==== Later samples ====
- "I'll Take Her" (Ill Al Scratch featuring Brian McKnight)
- "Body Bumpin' (Yippie-Yi-Yo) Remix" (Public Announcement)
- "Rodeo" (Juvenile) (samples: "Bump n' Grind (Old School Remix)")
- "Karate Chop Remix" (Future featuring Lil Wayne)
- "Songs on 12 Play" (Chris Brown featuring Trey Songz)

== "Bump & Grind 2014" ==
"Bump & Grind 2014"

Single by Waze & Odyssey vs. R. Kelly
- Released: October 19, 2014
- Recorded: 2012
- Genre: House
- Length: 3:00
- Label: RCA
- Songwriter: R. Kelly
- Producers: Serge Santiágo; Firas Waez

R. Kelly singles chronology
"It's Your World" (2014)	"Bump & Grind 2014" (2014)	"Ignition (Viceroy Remix)" (2014)

British house duo Waze & Odyssey produced a bootleg of the track in 2012, sampling "Push the Feeling On" by Nightcrawlers. The remix was officially released on October 19, 2014, peaking at #3 on the UK Singles Chart, and would be R. Kelly's last UK Top 40 hit prior to his criminal convictions.

=== Background ===
"Bump & Grind 2014" was produced by the duo Serge Santiágo and Firas Waez, also known as Waze & Odyssey. The record started as an underground hit in 2012, more DJs were playing the song at clubs as time went on. But it was not until 2014 it got a major release from their label RCA and started getting airplay. At the time it was an underground favorite among famous British DJs like Skream, DJ EZ, Duke Dumont, Rudimental were playing it at clubs.

We made it to play in a DJ set one night. We played it out and it went wild. Then a few DJs asked for a copy and they started playing it out and we were getting all these wild reports back. About a year ago someone approached us about releasing it and so we decided to put it out there for those who maybe hadn't heard it. It's been an underground favourite for a while now.

=== Music video ===
The music video was released two months before the actual official release of the song. The video features Hok from the American hip hop group Quest Crew as the main person.

=== Formats and track listings ===
- Digital download
1. "Bump & Grind 2014" – 3:00
- Digital remixes EP
1. "Bump & Grind 2014" (Extended Mix) – 7:23
2. "Bump & Grind 2014" (Special Request VIP) – 8:34
3. "Bump & Grind 2014" (Le Youth Remix) – 4:01

=== Charts ===
Chart (2014–2015)	Peak position
Australia (ARIA)	39
Australia Dance (ARIA)	8
Belgium (Ultratop 50 Flanders)	24
Ireland (IRMA)	65
Scottish Singles Sales (Official Charts)	3
UK Singles (Official Charts)	3
UK Dance (Official Charts)	1

=== Certifications ===
Region	Certification	Certified units/sales
United Kingdom (BPI)	Gold	400,000^{‡}
^{‡} Sales+streaming figures based on certification alone.

== See also ==
- List of Billboard Hot 100 number-one singles of 1994
- List of number-one R&B singles of 1994 (U.S.)
