= June's Diary =

American girl group

- Origin: Los Angeles, California, U.S.
- Genres: R&B; pop
- Years active: 2016–2022 (Note: Indefinite hiatus)
- Labels: Epic; Sony Music; Music of Sound
- Members: Gabrielle Carreiro; Kristal Smith; Ashly Williams; Brienna DeVlugt; Shyann Roberts

June's Diary is an American girl group formed by singer Kelly Rowland and director/choreographer Frank Gatson Jr. on the American reality television docu-series Chasing Destiny in 2016. The group consists of members Kristal Lyndriette Smith, Ashly Williams, Brienna DeVlugt, Gabrielle "Gabby" Carreiro and Shyann Roberts. They signed a deal with L.A. Reid's record label Epic Records, a division of Sony Music Entertainment, Inc. The group have supported various artists on tours, such as R. Kelly, Xscape & Jussie Smollett. Teamed Up with En Vogue on ABC's Greatest Hits show with Ken Erlich.

Following from the show Chasing Destiny, they released a buzz single "All of Us" to iTunes on June 7, 2016.

On June 24, 2016, their debut single "L.A.N.C.E." was released to iTunes.

== History ==
=== 2016: Chasing Destiny ===
Chasing Destiny was the docu-series in 2016 formed with the help of former Destiny's Child member Kelly Rowland and the famous choreographer/director Frank Gatson Jr. To find a new African American girl group based on talent and sisterhood. During an interview with New York Post Kelly Rowland stated "I felt like there was a void for a girls group in the music industry and this is something that I have wanted to do since Destiny's Child's Destiny Fulfilled tour. There were so many girl groups back in the day and now there is only two," she continues, referring to British girl group Little Mix and American girl group Fifth Harmony. "I want to show that women can get back to making money together."

Rowland held auditions for the girl group in three cities, narrowed down from 600 girls to 15 and later choosing the final five consisting(particularly order) Gabrielle "Gabby" Carreiro, Kristal Lyn Smith (originally from the girl group RichGirl), Ashly Williams, Brienna DeVlugt and Shyann Roberts. However, only DeVlugt, Carreiro and Roberts were selected as top 15. Williams was cut during the auditions but was later brought back by Gatson because he thought that talent was lacking among the top 15. Gatson also added Smith later as he had already worked with her in 2004 with Beyoncé during her Grammy Performance. During the process of the show the girls gained media success in May 2016 after a cover of Drake's "Hotline Bling" on Chasing Destiny went viral.

=== 2016–2017: Male Edition and subsequent releases ===
On June 7, 2016, as the final episode of Chasing Destiny, the group released their first buzz single on iTunes "All of Us" later confirming that despite conflicting reports, they are currently still in search of a name for the group. The quintet is signed to L.A. Reid's record label Epic Records, a division of Sony Music Entertainment. On June 23, 2016 they announced their official group name as June's Diary. Smith explained the story behind the name: "Even though we were put together in February, June is the month that we spiritually connected as a group. A lot of great things happened for us in the month of June. We were just having a talk last week, that something just clicked. Something just happened between us, and we were just like 'Wow.' And diary is just us telling our story and writing a different page every single day." On June 24, 2016, the group released their debut single "L.A.N.C.E" on iTunes before released the video during the red carpet event for the 2016 BET Awards. The group embarked on their first promotional tour in fall 2016, later joining R. Kelly on both the Buffet Tour and 12 Nights of Christmas tour after he was impressed with their performance of the Black National Anthem in the same year. During a Facebook Live, the group confirmed that their first full length project would be a mixtape. On March 16, 2017, the group released a cover of "Stay" by Jodeci, which would be one of the songs from their upcoming mixtape. On June 30, 2017, the group released their first mixtape titled Male Edition, which contains covers from male boy bands. The group released a song titled "I Know Why You Callin'" on YouTube and Soundcloud as an unofficial single. In late 2017, June's Diary opened up for Xscape for their reunion tour across America.

=== 2018–present: All of Us and debut studio album ===
Since the filming of Chasing Destiny, the group recorded original material for their debut extended play. In early 2018, the group had 2 pop-up shows in New York and Atlanta to help choose songs for their debut EP. Their debut extended play titled "All of Us" was eventually released on June 29, 2018 through the independent record label Music of Sound. The extended play debuted on the Billboard Top Heatseekers chart at number eighteen. They also briefly held the number one spot on iTunes Shortly after the release of their EP, the group began recording more material for their debut album which currently does not have a release date. In 2019, the group released the single "Take Your Time" which consisted of two tracks entitled "I Ain't With It" and "Stuntin". In September 2020, the group announced another single entitled "Way Off" which is set to be released on the 25th of September.

== Members ==
=== Ashly Williams ===
Ashly Breshé Williams was born on January 15, 1989 (age 37) originally from Compton, California

Williams auditioned for The X Factor in Los Angeles, CA, singing Whitney Houston's signature hit, a cover of Dolly Parton's "I Will Always Love You". She performed Aerosmith's song "I Don't Wanna Miss a Thing" during the 4 chair challenge gaining a seat to compete in Demi Lovato's final 4 in her Girls Category later being replaced by another contestant with Williams exit the competition. The R&B singer starred on the BET doc-series Chasing Destiny and became a member chosen as part of Kelly Rowland's girl group June's Diary.

=== Kristal Lyndriette Smith ===
Kristal Lyndriette Smith was born on July 28, 1988 (age 38) originally from Charlotte, North Carolina.

Smith was previously a member of the R&B four-person group RichGirl from 2007 to 2011. After parting ways from the group, she dropped an EP entitled Proclamation stating, this EP was just something for the fans to enjoy until she started her solo career. Smith joined Usher on his UR experience tour as one of his backup singers. She was brought onto the show "Chasing Destiny" in Episode 3 - Houston We Have A Problem. It was later revealed in Episode 7 - Black Girl Magic, that she would be a part of the girl group June's Diary.

=== Brienna DeVlugt ===
Brienna DeVlugt, was born on November 26, 1993 (age 32) originally from Trenton, New Jersey.

A daughter of Lincoln 'Link' DeVlugt, former member of Reggae boy group POV, she studied economics before dropping out with only three credits left to pursue her music career and try out for Chasing Destiny. However, she did go back and receive her degree in 2017. DeVlugt has cited Destiny's Child, Danity Kane and Dream as her biggest musical influences. R&B singer starred on the BET doc-series Chasing Destiny and became a member chosen as part of Kelly Rowland's girl group June's Diary.

=== Gabrielle Carreiro ===
Gabrielle "Gabby" Carreiro was born on May 20, 1996 (age 30) originally from Glendale, California.

Carreiro was signed up for choir in seventh grade by her father and grew to love music from there. In 2015, she released a YouTube Acapella song entitled "Bitter," which (since the inception of June's Diary) showcases her sultry jazz-inspired alto due to her different musical background. She has cited (influenced by) artists such as Talking Heads, The Badesses, Sarah Vaughan, and Michael Buble as some of her favorites. Carreiro starred on the BET doc-series Chasing Destiny and became one of the five finalists chosen to become part of Kelly Rowland's girl group June's Diary.

=== Shyann Roberts ===
Shyann Destiny Roberts was born on August 31, 1996 (age 30) originally from St. Petersburg, Florida.

She started singing at the age of 2 and has been performing since she was 4. Roberts has opened for known artists such as Boyz II Men and sang the National Anthem for a 76ers game once. R&B singer starred on the BET doc-series Chasing Destiny and became the youngest member chosen as part of Kelly Rowland's girl group June's Diary.

== Discography ==
=== Mixtapes ===
- Male Edition (2017)

=== Extended plays ===
List of extended plays, with selected chart positions and details
| Title | Details | Peak chart positions |
| Title | Details | US Heat. |
|---|---|---|
| All of Us | Released: June 30, 2018; Label: Music of Sound; Format: Digital download | 18 |

=== Singles ===
==== As lead artist ====
| Title | Year | Album |
|---|---|---|
| "L.A.N.C.E." | 2016 | Non-album single |
| "Stay" | 2017 | Male Edition |
| "I Know Why You Callin'" | 2017 | Non-album single |
| "I Ain't With It" / "Stuntin" | 2019 | Take Your Time |
| "Way Off" | 2020 | Non-album single |
| "Maniac" | 2021 | Non-album single |

==== As featured artist ====
| Title | Year | Album |
|---|---|---|
| "Jealous AF (Remix)" (Rings featuring June's Diary) | 2018 | Non-album single |

=== Promotional singles ===
| Title | Year | Album |
|---|---|---|
| "All of Us" | 2016 | All of Us |

=== Other appearances ===
| Title | Year | Other artist(s) | Album |
|---|---|---|---|
| "Thank You" | 2018 | Chanté Moore | 1 of 4 |

== Filmography ==
=== Television ===
| Year | Name | Role | Notes |
|---|---|---|---|
| 2016 | Chasing Destiny | Contestants | 10 Episodes |

== Tours ==
=== Headlining ===
- 2016: June's Diary Tour
- 2017: Essence Music Festival
- 2018: June's Diary SOB & Vinyl Tour
- 2019: Essence Music Festival - Teddy Riley

=== Opening act ===
- 2016: The Buffet Tour (R. Kelly)
- 2016: 12 Nights of Christmas Tour (R. Kelly)
- 2017: The Afterparty Tour (R. Kelly)
- 2017–2018: The Great Xscape Tour (Xscape)
- 2018: Sum of My Music Tour (Jussie Smollett)

== Awards and nominations ==
=== Eddy Awards ===
| Year | Nominee / work | Award | Result |
|---|---|---|---|
| 2018 | June's Diary | R&B/Soul Artist of the Year | Won |
