= Waze & Odyssey =

British electronic music duo

- Origin: United Kingdom
- Genres: House; tech house; deep house; techno; bass
- Occupation: Record producers
- Years active: 2011–2020
- Labels: W&O Street Tracks; Wolf; Tsuba; RCA
- Members: Serge Santiágo; Firas Waez
- Website: wazeandodyssey.com

Waze & Odyssey are a British electronic music duo consisting of Serge Santiago and Firas Waez.

In 2014, the duo had a top 3 UK chart hit in the UK with their remix of 1994 single "Bump n' Grind". The track went on to sell over 400,000 copies worldwide.

In 2020, the pair released a bootleg version of George Michael and Mary J. Blige's cover of Stevie Wonder's "Always" via Sony Records. All parties gave their blessing to the re-work and Michael himself made a cameo in the official music video.

Forming in 2011, the duo came to early prominence after releasing on labels such as Wolf Music, Let's Play House, Tsuba and Throne of Blood. In 2012 made their European DJ debut at Berghain nightclub in Panorama Bar, Berlin. The pair have gone on to tour the world extensively, playing across the world's leading electronic festivals and events. They have gone on to release music on labels for Green Velvet, Eats Everything and Jamie Jones, among others.

Waze & Odyssey head their own record label, W&O Street Tracks, which has seen releases from Groove Armada, Will Easton, Vonda7, Kill Frenzy, Lancelot, XXXY, Eliphino, Citizenn and Ejeca. The label has received plaudits from XL Recordings and Feel My Bicep Blog

Waze & Odyssey's sound brings together house music, techno and disco influences.

== Musical career ==
=== As producers ===
The pairing have released records on Wolf Music, petFood, Hottrax, Edible, Relief Records, Crosstown Rebels, Disco Bloodbath, Lets Play House, Tsuba, Throne of Bloody, and their own label W&O Street Tracks.

In 2012, they were nominated for Best Breakthrough Producers at the DJ Mag Awards.

They have also remixed a wide spectrum of artists such as Totally Enormous Extinct Dinosaurs, Ejeca, Disclosure and Duke Dumont.

=== As DJs ===
Waze & Odyssey have toured extensively across the world. They have played many of the world's biggest and most influential clubs such as Panorama Bar (Berghain), Fabric, The Warehouse Project, Amnesia and at festivals including Hideout, Glastonbury, EXIT Festival, Bestival, and Secret Garden Party.

They have received significant support from BBC Radio 1’s Pete Tong, Annie Mac & Danny Howard

In February 2015, they were invited to do the BBC Radio 1 Essential Mix.

They have featured on Boiler Room twice, first time in 2013 in Berlin where they made their debut alongside Tyree Cooper, Kyodai and DoP

In 2015, they were invited back to take over Boiler Room in London with their label Street Tracks with label acts Neville Watson, Lancelot and Nummer.

=== W&O Street Tracks ===
In 2012, Waze & Odyssey started their own label W&O Street Tracks, releasing across vinyl and digital formats.

As well as releasing their own music, the duo have championed the likes of Sage Caswell, Ejeca, Citizenn and XXXY, Lancelot, Kill Frenzy.

The label has seen support from the likes of Maya Jane Coles, Dusky, Mr G, Agoria, Huxley, Eats Everything & more.

=== "Bump & Grind 2014" ===
In late 2011, the duo created a bootleg containing R. Kelly's "Bump n' Grind" and MK's version of "Push the Feeling On" by Nightcrawlers to play in a DJ set. Having played it to Skream, he then requested a copy and the track took on a life of its own, going on to receive heavy club support across the UK and abroad from the likes of DJ EZ, Horse Meat Disco, Duke Dumont and more.

In 2013, Sony Records approached the duo to release the record. The track released by RCA sold over 200,000 copies in the UK alone and became a number 3 hit, attaining a higher first chart placing than the original record. The track featured an official remix from Paul Woolford (DJ) under his Special Request alias.

=== "Always" ===
In 2020, the duo made a comeback with the release of a revamped version of George Michael and Mary J. Blige's 1999 cover of the Stevie Wonder classic "As", together with Tommy Theo. The song was released under the title of "Always" and was given the seal of approval from all artists for the first time in musical history, with both Michael and Blige listed as credited artists.

== Discography ==
=== Singles ===
==== As lead artist ====
Year	Single	Chart Positions							Album
Year	Single	UK	UK Dance	AUS	AUS Dance	BEL	IRE	SCO	Album
"Bump & Grind 2014" (with R. Kelly)	2014	3	1	39	8	74	65	3	Non-album single
"Always" (vs. Tommy Theo)	2020	—	—	—	—	97	—	—	Non-album single
"Always" (with George Michael, Mary J. Blige and Tommy Theo)	2020	—	—	—	—	—	—	—	Non-album single

=== Singles/EPs ===
Title	Year	Label
"I Want You You You EP"	2012	Throne of Blood
"Love Attack"	2012	Disco Bloodbath Recordings
"Feel My Voices"	2012	Wolf Music
"Love That (Burns Hot Enough) / Ma Body"	2012	W&O Street Tracks
"Be Right There EP"	2012	Mad Tech
"Don't Bring Me Down"	2013	Tsuba Records
"Feelin You"	2013	LPH White
"Please Don't Dance EP"	2013	Dirt Crew Recordings
"Real Good Like EP"	2014	W&O Street Tracks
"Let's Call Out"	2014	W&O Street Tracks
"Ways of the Underground"	2015	W&O Street Tracks
"Bounce"	2015	W&O Street Tracks
"On The Downlow"	2015	W&O Street Tracks
"Go Go Go / We Go Home"	2016	Dirt Crew
"Ride My Truck / Strobe Lights"	2016	Viva Music
"No One Knowz"	2017	W&O Street Tracks
"Down With Tha"	2017	Edible
"Set It Off EP"	2017	Relief Records
"Something For Your Mind EP"	2017	Material
"All Of Us"	2018	W&O Street Tracks
"Shape"	2018	Hottrax

=== Remixes ===
Title	Year	Artist(s)
"Your Love"	2012	Totally Enormous Extinct Dinosaurs
"Lividup"	2012	Disclosure
"Need U (100%)"	2013	Duke Dumont
"Emperor"	2013	Ali Love
