= Born into the 90's =

Studio album by R. Kelly and Public Announcement
- Released: January 14, 1992
- Recorded: 1991
- Genres: R&B; new jack swing; soul; hip-hop
- Length: 46:52
- Label: Jive
- Producers: R. Kelly; Mr. Lee; Wayne Williams

R. Kelly chronology
Born into the 90's (1992)	12 Play (1993)

Public Announcement chronology
Born into the 90's (1992)	All Work, No Play (1998)

Singles from Born into the 90's
- 1. "She's Got That Vibe" Released: November 1991; 2. "Honey Love" Released: April 1992; 3. "Slow Dance (Hey Mr. DJ)" Released: August 1992; 4. "Hey Love (Can I Have a Word)" Released: October 1992; 5. "Dedicated" Released: January 1993

Professional ratings
Review scores
Source	Rating
AllMusic	3/5 stars
Blender	3/5 stars
Robert Christgau	(dud)
Entertainment Weekly	D+
Rolling Stone	2/5 stars

Born into the 90's is R. Kelly's collaboration album with his group Public Announcement. Released in January 1992, the album became an R&B hit with the success of singles such as "She's Got That Vibe" (the album's biggest hit in the UK, at No. 3), "Dedicated", and Kelly's first two No. 1 R&B hits: "Honey Love", and "Slow Dance (Hey Mr. DJ)". "Honey Love" topped the Billboard R&B Singles chart for two weeks, while "She's Got That Vibe" and "Slow Dance (Hey Mr DJ)" hit the Top 40 respectively. By June 1992, Born into the 90's was eventually certified platinum and picked up an American Music Award nomination for Favorite Soul/R&B Single ("Honey Love"). R. Kelly separated from the group before he began recording his next album.

== Track listing ==
All tracks are written by and producing by the Predator except where noted.

No.	Title	Writer(s)	Producer(s)	Length
1.	"She's Loving Me"	R. Kelly, Tyrone Blatcher, Michael Jefferson		3:38
2.	"She's Got That Vibe"			4:34
3.	"Definition of a Hotti"			4:21
4.	"I Know What You Need"			3:29
5.	"Keep It Street"			3:57
6.	"Born into the 90's"	R. Kelly, Karen Evans, Patrice Rushen		4:41
7.	"Slow Dance (Hey Mr. DJ)"			5:03
8.	"Dedicated"			4:40
9.	"Honey Love"			5:04
10.	"Hangin' Out"			4:07
11.	"Hey Love (Can I Have a Word)" (Mr. Lee featuring R. Kelly)	R. Kelly, Morris Broadnax, Lee Haggard, Clarence Paul, Wayne Williams, Stevie Wonder	Mr. Lee, Wayne Williams, R. Kelly	3:19

== Personnel ==
- Timmy Allen – programming
- Pete Christensen – assistant engineer
- Michael Clark – producer
- Rick "SL8" Cruz – engineer, assistant engineer
- Gary "Bump City" Daniels – programming (Tatum & West)
- Jose Fernandez – programming
- Georgette Franklin – background vocals
- Marcus Geeter – grooming
- Stephen George – producer
- Karen Gordon – background vocals
- Joe Grant – photography
- Barry Hankerson – executive producer
- Gerard Julien – engineer, assistant engineer
- R. Kelly – vocals, background vocals, producer, keyboards, drum programming, mixing
- Steven Levy – engineer, assistant engineer
- Doug Michael – engineer, assistant engineer
- Mr. Lee – arranger, programming, producer, vocals, mixing
- Peter Mokran – engineer, mixing
- Tim Nitz – engineer
- Cirland Noel – engineer
- Tim Nutz – assistant engineer
- Herb Powers – mastering
- Michael Schlesinger – engineer, mixing
- Dana Stovall – background vocals
- Allan Byrd Tatum – programming, background vocals
- Chris Trevett – engineer, mixing
- Tom Vercillo – programming, engineer, mixing
- Bobby West – keyboards
- Danny Wilensky – saxophone
- Wayne Williams – producer
- Nicole Wilson – background vocals

== Charts ==
=== Weekly charts ===
Chart (1992)	Peak position
Australian Albums (ARIA)	146
Dutch Albums (Album Top 100)	50
UK Albums (Official Charts)	67
US Billboard 200	42
US Top R&B/Hip-Hop Albums (Billboard)	3
Chart (2001)	Peak position
French Albums (SNEP)	79

=== Year-end charts ===
Chart (1992)	Position
US Billboard 200	96
US Top R&B/Hip-Hop Albums (Billboard)	4

== Certifications ==
Region	Certification	Certified units/sales
United States (RIAA)	Platinum	1,000,000^{^}
^{^} Shipments figures based on certification alone.
