= All About Us =

All About Us may refer to:

== Film and television ==
- All About Us (TV series), a 2001 American teen sitcom
- All About Us: Living and Growing, a British Sex and Relationships Education video series
- All About Us, a 2007 film featuring LaTanya Richardson

== Music ==
- All About Us (musical), by Kander and Ebb
- "All About Us" (Peter Andre song), 1997
- "All About Us" (t.A.T.u. song), 2005
- "All About Us", a song by He Is We from My Forever, 2010
- "All About Us", a song by Jordan Fisher, 2016
