= Male Edition =

Mixtape by June's Diary
- Released: June 29, 2017
- Genre: R&B
- Length: 25:13
- Label: Independent
- Producer: Dee Roze; Globetrakkers

June's Diary chronology
Male Edition (2017)	All of Us (EP) (2018)

Singles from Male Edition
- 1. "Stay" Released: March 20, 2017

Male Edition is the debut mixtape by American girl group June's Diary. It was released on June 29, 2017, through SoundCloud. The mixtape features six covers of songs originally recorded by male groups Shai, Jodeci, Bell Biv DeVoe, The Deele, Jagged Edge, and The Beatles and one original song.

== Background ==
On March 16, 2017, June's Diary released a new music video for their cover of Jodeci's "Stay" via their YouTube channel. A behind the scenes video was released the following day via That Grape Juice's YouTube channel.

== Critical reception ==
The mixtape was received with positive reviews from critics. ThisisRnB praised the mixtape thus: "Combining their outstanding vocal talents, inspiration from ’90s R&B and adding their own modern vibes, the mixtape is sure to have fans everywhere hitting replay and wanting more."

== Singles ==
"Stay" was released as the first single from the mixtape on March 20, 2017. The music video premiered four days before the song was released.

== Track listing ==
Male Edition
No.	Title	Writer(s)	Producer(s)	Length
1.	"If I Ever Fall In Love"	Carl "Groove" Martin		1:34
2.	"Stay"	DeVante Swing		5:04
3.	"Poison"	Elliot Straite	Dee Roze	4:18
4.	"Two Occasions"	Kenneth "Babyface" Edmonds; Darnell "Dee" Bristol; Sid Johnson		4:09
5.	"Hey Jude"	John Lennon; Paul McCartney		2:42
6.	"Where the Party At"	Jermaine Dupri; Brandon Casey; Bryan-Michael Cox; Brian Casey; Cornell Hayes		3:44
7.	"Wrap Around"		Dem Jointz	3:39
Total length:				25:13

== Release history ==
Country	Date	Format	Ref.
Worldwide	29 June 2017	Digital download	
