= Dedicated (song) =

Single by R. Kelly and Public Announcement

from the album Born into the 90's
- Released: January 1993
- Recorded: 1991
- Genre: R&B
- Length: 4:40
- Label: Jive
- Songwriter: R. Kelly
- Producer: R. Kelly

R. Kelly and Public Announcement singles chronology
| "Hey Love (Can I Have a Word)" (1992) | "Dedicated" (1993) | "Sex Me" (1993) |

"Dedicated" is a song by American singer, songwriter, and record producer R. Kelly and his group Public Announcement from their debut collaboration album, Born into the 90's (1992). The song was written and produced by Kelly, dedicated to his mother, Joanne Kelly, who died in 1993. It was released by Jive Records in January 1993 as the fifth and last single from the album. The single was a top ten hit on the US Billboard Hot R&B/Hip-Hop Songs chart, and peaked at numbers 31 and 36 on the Billboard Hot 100 and Cash Box Top 100, becoming the album's best charting single on the pop chart. An accompanying music video was released in January 1993. It was Kelly's first music video to be added to regular rotation by MTV. "Dedicated" was used in the 1993 film Menace II Society.

== Charts ==
=== Weekly charts ===
| Chart (1993) | Peak position |
|---|---|
| US Billboard Hot 100 | 31 |
| US Hot R&B/Hip-Hop Songs (Billboard) | 9 |
| US Rhythmic Airplay (Billboard) | 8 |
| US Cash Box Top 100 | 36 |

=== Year-end charts ===
| Chart (1993) | Position |
|---|---|
| US Hot R&B/Hip-Hop Songs (Billboard) | 41 |
