= Modern Skirts =

American alternative indie rock band

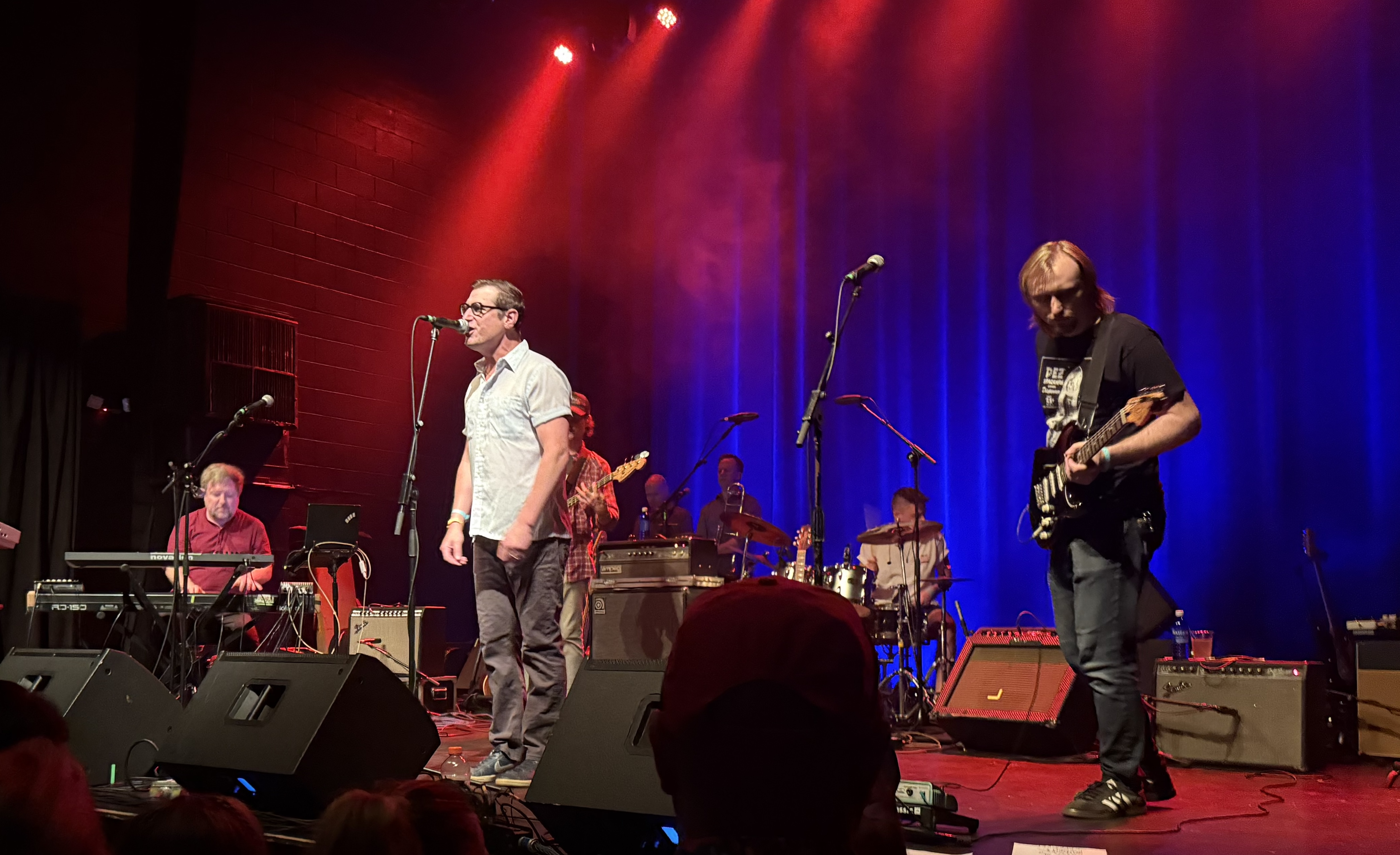
- Modern Skirts performing in 2025

Background information
- Origin: Athens, Georgia, U.S.
- Genres: Alternative rock, indie rock
- Years active: 2004–2013
- Members: Jay Gulley; JoJo Glidewell; Phillip Brantley; John Q. Swint

Modern Skirts was an alternative rock band based in Athens, Georgia. Formed in 2004, the band consisted of four members: Jay Gulley (guitar and vocals), JoJo Glidewell (guitar, piano, and vocals), Phillip Brantley (bass, guitar, and vocals) and John Q. Swint (drums). The band released three studio albums: Catalogue of Generous Men, All Of Us In Our Night, and Gramahawk, before dissolving in 2013.

== History ==
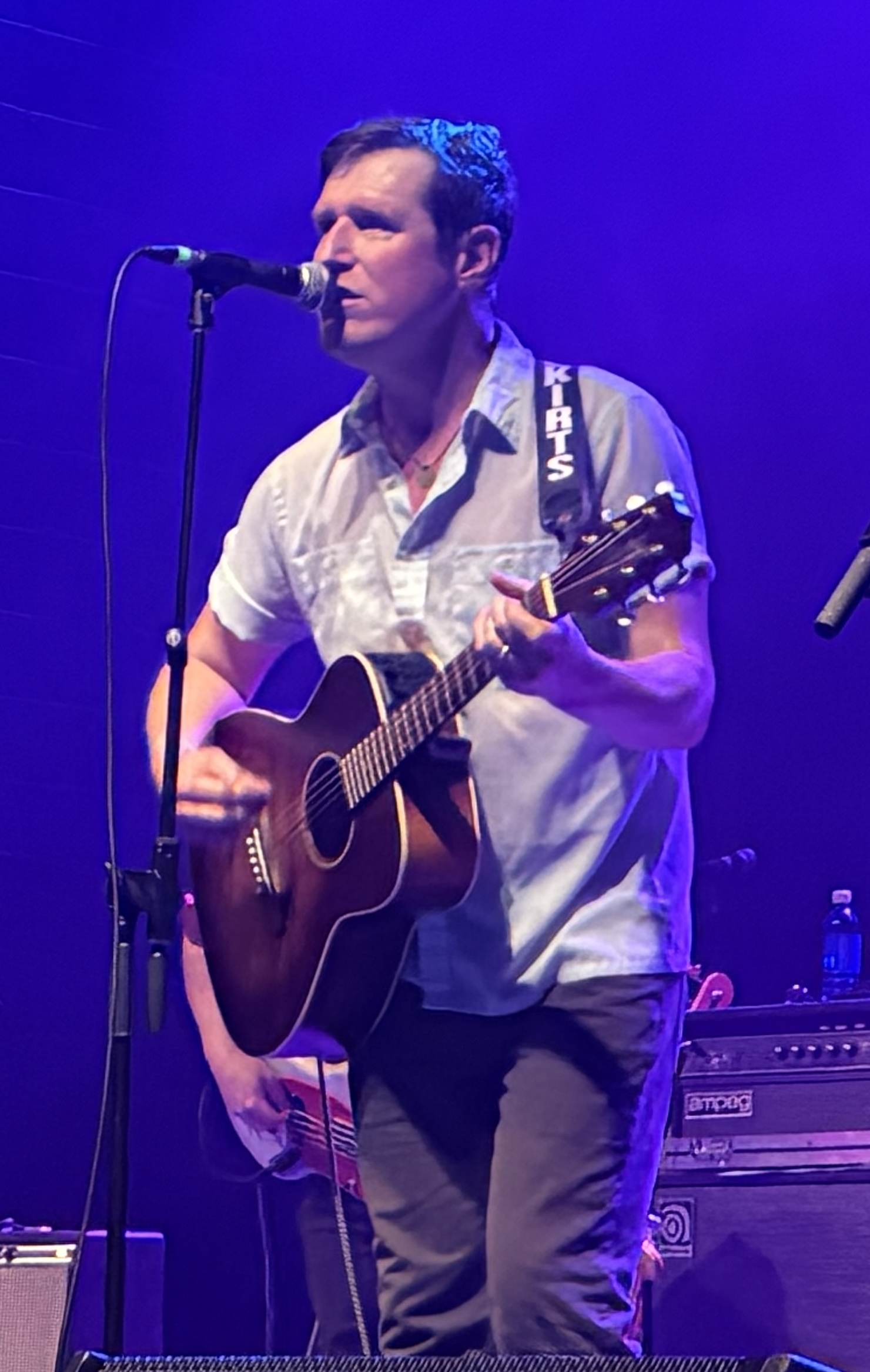
Jay Gulley, 2025

=== Formation and first album ===
Formed in early 2004, the band quickly gained popularity and notoriety in the Athens music scene thanks largely to the buzz created by their high-energy live shows in the Athens area, mostly at the world-famous 40 Watt Club. They released an EP entitled This is Winning and Thinking in 2004. August 2005 saw the independent release of their debut LP, titled Catalogue of Generous Men. The album quickly became a standard in Athens and won the band the first of several Athens Music Awards. The album has been praised in various media outlets, most notably in Paste Magazine and on National Public Radio. The vocal harmonies and subtle melancholy in songs like "Pasadena" and "Sugarpile" have helped to secure the group's success in Athens and around the Southeast. Modern Skirts prominent use of the piano derives from the significant influences of groups such as The Beach Boys, and their flexible use of song structure centers around catchy melodies and memorable hooks, similar to those used in Brit-Pop and by The Velvet Underground.

=== European tour and later albums ===
The band spent 2006 and 2007 touring intensively up and down the east coast and across the southeastern USA. They enjoyed a short but successful tour in England in the fall of 2007, where they were filmed by producers from The Tube, who became interested in the band after R.E.M. bassist Mike Mills cited Modern Skirts as his favorite Athens band in a post Hall of Fame interview early 2007. Also in 2007, the band released a single, "Four More Years", as well as recorded a version of the R.E.M. song "Perfect Circle" for the tribute album Finest Worksongs. The February 2008 issue of Q magazine featured a CD with a single from the then-upcoming All Of Us In Our Night, which was released in October 2008. During the summer of 2008 the band spent two weeks on a European tour, the highlight of which was opening for R.E.M. in Amsterdam and Belgium. The band's second EP, Happy 81, was released in July 2010. Their third and final full-length album, Gramahawk, was released in 2011, and a single, "Tennessee", in 2012.

=== Dissolution of the band ===
On February 28, 2013, the band announced their breakup in an email to fans and played their last show at the 40 Watt Club on April 5, 2013. The band members all felt "that Modern Skirts has run its course, both creatively and professionally". The band members continue to play music solo.

In 2021, the band reunited for the first time in nearly a decade to play the September Days Festival.

== Discography ==
- This Is Winning and Thinking (EP), 2004
- Catalogue of Generous Men, 2005
- Athfest Compilation, 2006
- Finest Worksongs: Athens Bands Play the Music of R.E.M, 2007
- Four More Years (Single), 2007
- All of Us in Our Night, 2008
- Happy 81 (EP), 2010
- Gramahawk, 2011
- Tennessee (Single), 2012
