= All Work, No Play =

Studio album by Public Announcement
- Released: March 24, 1998
- Recorded: 1997–1998
- Genres: R&B, electronic, dance
- Length: 64:35
- Label: A&M
- Producers: Henley Regisford Jr, Travon Potts, Earl Robinson, Michael Angelo Saulsberry, M-Doc, Cleveland Fields, Frank Fitzpatrick

Public Announcement chronology
Born into the 90's (1992)	All Work, No Play (1998)	Don't Hold Back (2001)

Singles from All Work, No Play
- 1. "Body Bumpin' (Yippie-Yi-Yo)" Released: Jan 27, 1998; 2. "It's About Time" Released: 1998

Professional ratings
Review scores
Source	Rating
AllMusic	3/5 stars

All Work, No Play is Public Announcement's second studio album and first album without singer R. Kelly. Released on March 24, 1998, the album features the hit single, "Body Bumpin' (Yippie-Yi-Yo)", which charted at number five on the Billboard Hot 100.

== Track listing ==
No.	Title	Writer(s)	Length
1.	"Body Bumpin' (Yippie-Yi-Yo)"	Feloney Davis, Euclid Gray, Monica Gray	4:34
2.	"Turn the Hands"	Feloney Davis	4:24
3.	"It's About Time"	Travon Potts	5:06
4.	"Dog in Me" (featuring Roger)	Feloney Davis	4:23
5.	"All Work, No Play"	Feloney Davis, Earl Robinson	4:43
6.	"Alone"	Feloney Davis	5:00
7.	"Y to the Yippie (Step On)"	Feloney Davis	5:30
8.	"Straight from the Heart"	Felton C. Pilate II	4:50
9.	"Homey"	Feloney Davis	5:08
10.	"Why You Not Trustin' Me"	Travon Potts	4:55
11.	"Body Bumpin' (Yippie-Yi-Yo)" (featuring Mingo Valentino)	Feloney Davis, Earl Robinson	5:26
12.	"Country RGB- Interlude"		0:41
13.	"Lonely"	Earl Robinson	4:08
14.	"Children Hold On (To Your Dreams)"	Vernon Bullock	5:47

== Credits and personnel ==
Credits adapted from AllMusic.

- Timmy Allen – programming
- Lemoyne Alexander – guitar, keyboards
- Steve B. – mixing assistant
- Chris Bauer – engineer
- Craig Bayer – engineer
- Rufus Blaq – guest artist, rap
- Ian Boxill – engineer
- Vernon Bullock – composer
- Feloney Davis – arranger, composer, Unknown Contributor Role, Vocals
- Charles "Chip" Dubose – guitar
- Mike Dunn – arranger, engineer, mixing, producer, programming
- Leroy Edward – guitar
- Cleveland Fields – keyboards, producer, programming, Strings
- Frank Fitzpatrick – producer
- Flawless – vocals
- Dan Garcia – engineer
- Larimie Garcia – design
- Brian Gardner – Mastering
- Jim Godsey – engineer
- Euclid Gray – arranger, composer, Unknown Contributor Role, Vocals
- Monica Gray – composer
- Ron Hall – bass
- Tracy Hogan – vocals
- Mikael Ifversen – engineer
- Steve Johnson – assistant engineer, mixing assistant
- Booker T. Jones III – mixing
- Kelly G. – drum programming
- Michael Lavine – Photography
- Lele – vocals
- Ron Lew – mixing assistant
- Life – vocals
- Tatiana Litvin – vocals
- Ron Lowe – mixing assistant
- M-Doc – drum programming, keyboards, producer
- Bill Meyers – String Arrangements
- Peter Mokran – mixing
- Matt Molina – assistant engineer, mixing assistant
- Robert "Rob Dog" Morrison – keyboards
- Shaquille O'Neal – Guest Artist, Rap
- Felton C. Pilate II – composer
- Carl Potts – guitar (Acoustic), Guitar (Electric)
- Travon Potts – arranger, composer, producer, Vocal Arrangement
- Matt Prock – assistant engineer, guitar (Acoustic), Mixing Assistant
- Public Announcement – arranger, Primary Artist, Vocals, Vocals (Background)
- Henley Regisford – executive producer
- Henley Regisford, Jr. – executive producer
- Unohoo Regisford – executive producer
- Earl Robinson – arranger, composer, drum programming, keyboards, producer, programming, Unknown Contributor Role, Vocals
- Roger – Guest Artist, Performer, Primary Artist, Vocals
- Greg Ross – Art Direction, Design
- Michael Angelo Saulsberry – producer
- Oscar Seaton – drums
- Eric Sexton – associate executive producer, Associate Producer
- Soul Children of Chicago – Guest Artist, Vocals
- Martin Stebbing – engineer, mixing
- Unohoo – arranger, executive producer
- Mingo Valentino – rap, vocals
- Steve Weeder – engineer, mixing
- Walt Whitman – Guest artist, vocals
- Glenn Wright – arranger, vocals

== Charts ==
=== Weekly charts ===
Chart (1998)	Peak position
US Billboard 200	81
US Top R&B/Hip-Hop Albums	14

=== Year-end charts ===
Chart (1998)	Peak position
US Top R&B/Hip-Hop Albums	71
