= Hey Love (Can I Have a Word) =

"Hey Love (Can I have a Word)"

Single by R. Kelly and Public Announcement featuring Mr. Lee

from the album Born into the 90's
- Released: October 1992
- Recorded: 1991
- Genre: R&B; hip hop; new jack swing
- Length: 3:20
- Label: Jive
- Songwriters: R. Kelly; Morris Broadnax; Lee Haggard; Clarence Paul; Wayne Williams; Stevie Wonder
- Producers: Mr. Lee; Wayne Williams; R. Kelly

R. Kelly and Public Announcement featuring Mr. Lee singles chronology
"Slow Dance (Hey Mr. DJ)" (1992)	"Hey Love (Can I have a Word)" (1992)	"Body Bumpin' (Yippie-Yi-Yo)" (1998)

R. Kelly singles chronology
"Slow Dance (Hey Mr. DJ)" (1992)	"Hey Love (Can I Have a Word)" (1993)	"Dedicated" (1993)

"Hey Love (Can I Have a Word)" is a song by American R&B singer R. Kelly and Public Announcement featuring Mr. Lee from their debut album, Born into the 90's (1992). It was released as a single on Jive Records in October 1992. The song incorporates the melody and lyrics of Stevie Wonder's "Hey Love" from his 1966 album Down to Earth. The single reached number one on the Billboard's Bubbling Under Hot 100 chart and number 15 on the Billboard R&B chart. The accompanying music video was directed by American director and VJ Lionel C. Martin.

== Charts ==
=== Weekly charts ===
Chart (1992–1993)	Peak position
Australia (ARIA)	183
US Bubbling Under Hot 100 (Billboard)	1
US Hot R&B/Hip-Hop Songs (Billboard)	15

=== Year-end charts ===
Chart (1993)	Position
US Hot R&B/Hip-Hop Songs (Billboard)	97
