= Catalogue of Generous Men =

Studio album by Modern Skirts
- Released: 2005
- Genre: Rock
- Label: Go To Your Room

Catalogue of Generous Men is the first full-length album released by Modern Skirts. The album was released in August 2004 and subsequently won an Athens Music Award for "Album of the Year", as well as for "Best Cover Art".

The album has received accolades in Paste Magazine, on National Public Radio (NPR), and in other local and national media outlets.

== Track listing ==
1. "New York Song"
2. "Seventeen Dirty Magazines"
3. "My Bully"
4. "Pasadena"
5. "City Lights"
6. "Tonight Before You Were Sleeping"
7. "September Days"
8. "My Lost Soprano"
9. "Save Me"
10. "Ring The Bell"
11. "Sugarpile"
