= All About Us: Living and Growing =

British sex and relationships education programme

All About Us: Living and Growing is a British Sex and Relationships Education programme for 5–13 year olds published by Channel 4 on VHS and DVD including worksheets for use in class. The series is often referred to by its short name of Living and Growing. It covers the differences between a boy and a girl, puberty, how babies are made and how babies are born. The programme was put into units 1, 2, 3 and 4.

== Units ==
The first three units the programme includes gently introducing sex education to younger children, through puberty and birth, to media images, same-sex relationships and teenage pregnancy. The fourth unit covers puberty and body image in more detail, with a focus on maintaining a healthy mind and body.

Unit 1 — Age 5-7 Differences | How did I get here? | Growing up

Unit 2 — Age 7-9 Changes | How babies are made | How babies are born

Unit 3 — Age 9-11 Girl talk | Boy talk | Let's talk about sex

Unit 4 — Age 11-13 Puberty | Body image | Making the right choices

As of July 7, 2012, the DVDs were removed from the Channel 4 product catalogue as a result of the government's announcement that the PSHE curriculum is under review. The alternative version, featuring the first three units, was released in 2013 as the review had not taken place.

In the alternative version, Girl Talk and Boy Talk were moved to Unit 2 which now focuses mainly on puberty. How babies are made and How babies are born took their place in Unit 3 and the Let's talk about sex episode was dropped.

== Controversy ==
The programme has come under scrutiny by parents because of its graphic cartoon depictions of sexual intercourse and foreplay in Unit 2. Although the Alternative version removed some of the more explicit content, concerns have still been expressed, and it has been noted that the worksheets remain unchanged, and the original DVDs were not recalled.
