= She's Got That Vibe =

1991 single by R. Kelly and Public Announcement

- 1992 release with Public Announcement

Single by R. Kelly and Public Announcement

from the album Born into the 90's
- Released: November 1991
- Genre: New jack swing
- Length: 4:34
- Label: Jive
- Songwriter: R. Kelly
- Producer: R. Kelly

R. Kelly and Public Announcement singles chronology
"She's Got That Vibe" (1991)	"Honey Love" (1992)

Music video
- "She's Got That Vibe" on YouTube

"She's Got That Vibe" is a song by American R&B singer-songwriter R. Kelly and Public Announcement from Kelly's debut studio album, Born into the 90's (1992). It was written and produced by Kelly. The song was released as Kelly's debut single through Jive Records in November 1991. It was a top-10 hit on the US Billboard Hot R&B Singles chart, peaking at number seven. It also peaked at number three on the UK Singles Chart on re-release in 1994 and number 59 in the Billboard Hot 100. "She Got That Vibe" was later picked on R. Kelly's first compilation album, The R. in R&B Collection, Vol. 1.

== Critical reception ==
Upon the re-release, Andy Beevers from Music Week gave the song a score of four out of five and named it Pick of the Week in the category of Dance, writing, "With its strong hook and bouncy uptempo swing feel, it should now be the hit it deserved to be all along." Another Music Week editor, Alan Jones, described it as an "energetic jackswinger" and "impressively sung by Kelly". James Hamilton from the Record Mirror Dance Update named it a "harmonizing 'vibe' nagged snappy 1992 jackswinger" in his weekly dance column. Emma Cochrane from Smash Hits gave "She's Got That Vibe" three out of five, noting that the singer "has wisely dropped the sexist lyrics of his latest release, 'Summer Bunnies', and instead gone for a swingbeaty kind of groove. However, it's just all a bit too smooth."

== Music video ==
The accompanying music video for "She's Got That Vibe" was directed by R. Kelly himself.

== Charts ==
=== Weekly charts ===
Chart (1992)	Peak position
Australia (ARIA)	28
Belgium (Ultratop 50 Flanders)	50
Netherlands (Dutch Top 40)	15
Netherlands (Single Top 100)	15
New Zealand (Recorded Music NZ)	19
UK Singles (Official Charts)	57
UK Dance (Music Week)	16
UK Club Chart (Music Week)	75
US Billboard Hot 100	59
US Dance Singles Sales (Billboard)	44
US Hot R&B/Hip-Hop Songs (Billboard)	7

Chart (1994)	Peak position
Europe (Eurochart Hot 100)	15
Europe (European Dance Radio)	14
Ireland (IRMA)	25
UK Singles (Official Charts)	3
UK Airplay (Music Week)	10
UK Dance (Music Week)	7
UK Club Chart (Music Week)	34

=== Year-end charts ===
Chart (1994)	Position
UK Singles (OCC)	54

== Certifications ==
Region	Certification	Certified units/sales
United Kingdom (BPI)	Silver	200,000^{^}
^{^} Shipments figures based on certification alone.

== Release history ==
Region	Date	Format(s)	Label(s)	Ref.
United States	November 1991	12-inch vinyl; cassette	Jive	
Australia	January 27, 1992	12-inch vinyl; CD	Jive	
Australia	March 16, 1992	Cassette	Jive	
United Kingdom	April 27, 1992	7-inch vinyl; 12-inch vinyl; CD	Jive	
United Kingdom (re-release)	October 10, 1994	12-inch vinyl; CD; cassette	Jive	
