= Your Body's Callin' =

1994 single by R. Kelly

- US CD maxi-single

Single by R. Kelly

from the album 12 Play
- Released: April 1994
- Length: 4:37
- Label: Jive
- Songwriter: Robert Kelly
- Producer: R. Kelly

R. Kelly singles chronology
| "Bump n' Grind" (1994) | "Your Body's Callin'" (1994) | "Summer Bunnies" (1994) |

"Your Body's Callin'" is a song by American singer and songwriter R. Kelly, released in April 1994 by Jive Records as the third single from his debut album, 12 Play (1993). The song, both written and produced by Kelly, peaked at number 13 on the US Billboard Hot 100 and reached the top 40 in New Zealand and the United Kingdom. Kelly also released a remix as a B-side to the single featuring Aaliyah called the "Your Body's Calling His N Hers Mix". Millicent Shelton directed the song's accompanying music video.

== Critical reception ==
Michael Bonner from Melody Maker commented, "I guess, deep down, I'm an old softie at heart — and, whenever I hear soul like this that's as smooth as a Galaxy chocolate bar, I can't help reaching for my Barry White chest wig. There's a gentle, inoffensive bass, husky backing vocals, sleek production, and R Kelly's voice: soft, insistent, persuasive. Cos he knows, you know. He knows your body's calling. Oh, yes he does." Andy Beevers from Music Week gave the song four out of five and named it Pick of the Week in the category of Dance, writing, "Having narrowly missed out on a mainstream Top 40 placing with his last single, "Bump n' Grind", R Kelly looks set to be more successful with this smooth and mellow soul ballad. Not only is it a stronger song, but it will be helped by the US singer's recent UK tour, which included a four-night stint at the Apollo Hammersmith." Another Music Week editor, Alan Jones, felt "Your Body's Callin'" had more chance of success in the UK than its predecessor and "could just become a hit." James Hamilton from the Record Mirror Dance Update named it a "sexy tortuous 67bpm slow jam" in his weekly dance column.

== Music video ==
The music video for "Your Body's Callin'" was directed by American music video, television and film director Millicent Shelton. The video, set to appear that it was filmed in the summer, was filmed in the winter.

== Charts ==
=== Weekly charts ===
| Chart (1994) | Peak position |
|---|---|
| New Zealand (Recorded Music NZ) | 43 |
| UK Singles (OCC) | 19 |
| UK Airplay (Music Week) | 27 |
| UK Dance (Music Week) | 12 |
| UK Club Chart (Music Week) | 75 |
| US Billboard Hot 100 | 13 |
| US Dance Singles Sales (Billboard) | 4 |
| US Hot R&B/Hip-Hop Songs (Billboard) | 2 |
| US Rhythmic Airplay (Billboard) | 3 |

=== Year-end charts ===
| Chart (1994) | Position |
|---|---|
| US Billboard Hot 100 | 64 |
| US Hot R&B Singles (Billboard) | 9 |

== Certifications ==
| Region | Certification | Certified units/sales |
|---|---|---|
| United States (RIAA) | Gold | 500,000^{^} |
^{^} Shipments figures based on certification alone.

== Release history ==
| Region | Date | Format(s) | Label(s) | Ref. |
|---|---|---|---|---|
| United States | April 1994 | 12-inch vinyl; CD; cassette | Jive | |
| United Kingdom | May 2, 1994 | 7-inch vinyl; 12-inch vinyl; CD; cassette | Jive | |

== Samplings and covers ==
- Hip hop producer DJ Premier sampled Kelly singing "It's unbelievable" for the Notorious B.I.G.'s song "Unbelievable" on his album Ready to Die released later in 1994.
- The song has been interpolated the line by Ron Isley's longtime collaborator Kelly by the Isley Brothers on the song "Warm Summer Nights", with background vocals by Angela Winbush towards the end of the track from the album Eternal, released in 2001.
- The song has also been sampled by Whodini on the song "Be My Lady" also featuring Kelly, from their album Six.
- Norman Brown covered the song in 1996 in his album Better Days Ahead.
