= Summer Bunnies =

Single by R. Kelly

from the album 12 Play
- Released: July 28, 1994
- Recorded: 1993
- Genre: Hip hop; R&B; new jack swing
- Length: 4:14
- Label: Jive
- Songwriter(s): Robert Kelly
- Producer(s): R. Kelly

R. Kelly singles chronology
"Your Body's Callin'" (1994)	"Summer Bunnies" (1994)	"You Remind Me of Something" (1995)

"Summer Bunnies" is a song written, produced and performed by American R&B musician R. Kelly, released in July 1994 by Jive Records as the fourth single from his debut album, 12 Play (1993). The song reached number 55 on the US Billboard Hot 100, number 23 on the UK Singles Chart and number 20 on the US R&B chart. It heavily samples the 1982 Gap Band song "Outstanding". The remix of the song which featured his protégé Aaliyah, sampled the 1970 The Spinners' hit "It's a Shame".

== Critical reception ==
Andy Beevers from Music Week gave the song a full score of five out of five and named it Pick of the Week in the category of Dance, saying, "Having finally crossed over with 'Your Body's Callin'', R Kelly is now poised for even bigger things with this smooth summer swing tune plucked from 12 Play. With a whole host of new mixes from the man himself plus Teddy Riley and Tosh, this single is going to fly." Pan-European magazine Music & Media wrote, "Listen to the great macho lingo on the piano ballad 'Summer Bunnies', and you know what kind of "brotha" Kelly is." James Hamilton from the Record Mirror Dance Update declared it as a "typical nasally whined and muttered rolling slow jam" in his weekly dance column.

== Music video ==
The accompanying music video for "Summer Bunnies" was shot for the remix featuring Aaliyah (Summer Bunnies Contest remix), as opposed to the album version.

== Charts ==
Chart (1994)	Peak position
Europe (European Dance Radio)	17
Netherlands (Dutch Top 40 Tipparade)	16
Netherlands (Dutch Single Tip)	9
UK Singles (OCC)	23
UK Dance (OCC)	7
UK Dance (Music Week)	7
UK Club Chart (Music Week)	44
US Billboard Hot 100	55
US Hot Dance Music/Maxi-Singles Sales (Billboard)	20
US Rhythmic Top 40 (Billboard)	22
US Hot R&B/Hip-Hop Singles & Tracks (Billboard)	20
