= Honey Love (R. Kelly and Public Announcement song) =

Single by R. Kelly and Public Announcement

from the album Born into the 90's
- Released: April 1992
- Recorded: 1991
- Genre: R&B
- Length: 5:04 (album version); 4:03 (single version)
- Label: Jive
- Songwriter: R. Kelly
- Producer: R. Kelly

R. Kelly and Public Announcement singles chronology
"She's Got That Vibe" (1991)	"Honey Love" (1992)	"Slow Dance (Hey Mr. DJ)" (1993)

"Honey Love" is a song by American R&B singer R. Kelly and his group Public Announcement from Kelly's debut studio album Born into the 90's (1992). It was released as the album's second single on Jive Records in April 1992.

The song became Kelly's first number-one on the Billboard R&B chart where it peaked for two weeks. It also reached the Top 40 of the pop chart, peaking at number 39 on the Billboard Hot 100.

The song was also used in the 1993 movie Menace II Society.

== Music video ==
The music video was directed by Lionel C. Martin. It features a cameo appearance by actress Halle Berry.

== Legacy ==
During the tour in support of Born into the 90's, Kelly came up with the concept for his album 12 Play. In the breakdown of "Honey Love", he addressed the audience and told them about "a dream where I made love to Mary J. Blige", which became the song "12 Play".

R. Kelly mentions "Honey Love" in a verse of "I Wish": "'Honey Love' goes platinum and y'all ass come around / But y'all don't wanna raise the roof until my shit is going down."

== Charts ==
=== Weekly charts ===
Chart (1992)	Peak position
Australia (ARIA)	123
UK Dance (Music Week)	56
US Billboard Hot 100	39
US Hot Dance Music/Maxi-Singles Sales (Billboard)	40
US Hot R&B/Hip-Hop Songs (Billboard)	1

=== Year-end charts ===
Chart (1992)	Position
US Hot R&B/Hip-Hop Songs (Billboard)	2

== See also ==
- List of number-one R&B singles of 1992 (U.S.)
