= Pump That Body (Mr. Lee song) =

Single by Mr. Lee

from the album Get Busy
- Released: 1990
- Genre: House
- Label: Jive
- Songwriters: Mr. Lee, Robert Smith
- Producer: Mr. Lee

Pump That Body is a 1990 dance single by American producer/remixer, Mr. Lee. The single was Mr. Lee's highest entry on the dance charts, hitting number one for one week. "Pump That Body" did not chart on any other American chart.

== Chart performance ==
=== Weekly charts ===
Chart (1990)	Peak position
Australia (ARIA Charts)	139
Canadian RPM Dance (RPM)	3
Netherlands (Dutch Top 40)	7
Netherlands (Single Top 100)	7
New Zealand (Recorded Music NZ)	41
UK Singles (Official Charts Company)	79
US Hot Dance Club Play (Billboard)	1
US Hot Dance Music/Maxi-Singles Sales (Billboard)	8

=== Year-end charts ===
Chart (1990)	Position
Netherlands (Dutch Top 40)	88
Netherlands (Single Top 100)	49
