= Chasing Destiny =

American reality television series

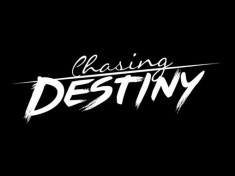
- Genre: Reality competition
- Created by: Kelly Rowland
- Directed by: Kelly Rowland & Frank Gatson Jr.
- Creative director: Frank Gatson, Jr.
- Starring: Kelly Rowland; Frank Gatson, Jr.
- Country of origin: United States
- Original language: English
- No. of seasons: 1
- No. of episodes: 10

Production
- Executive producers: Kelly Rowland; Jesse Ignjatovic; Evan Prager; Tim Witherspoon; Danny Rose; Jason Sands
- Running time: 40 minutes

Original release
- Network: BET
- Release: April 5 – June 7, 2016

Chasing Destiny is an American reality television docuseries whose aim is to find the next superstar girl group. June's Diary eventually was formed through the program.

The show was created by Kelly Rowland and also features dance choreographer and director Frank Gatson, Jr. Rowland is trying to assemble a musical group of Black girls based on talent and sisterhood, like the group she herself was once in, Destiny's Child. She has had auditions in three cities and has narrowed a list of 600 girls down to 15. Unlike the case with many other reality TV-made groups, Rowland seems invested in making this group a success.

== Top 18 ==
Name	Hometown	Status
Shyann	St. Petersburg, FL	Advanced
Brienna	Trenton, NJ	Advanced
Ashly	Compton, CA	Advanced
Kristal	Charlotte, NC	Advanced
Gabby	Glendale, CA	Advanced
Skye	Lafayette, LA	Eliminated
Alyxx	Los Angeles, CA	Eliminated
Mayah	Woodbridge, VA	Eliminated
Khylah	Chicago, IL	Eliminated
Candace	Philadelphia, PA	Eliminated
Jennifer	Buffalo, NY	Eliminated
Johari	Chicago, IL	Eliminated
Jaime	Los Angeles, CA	Eliminated
A$H.	Atlanta, GA	Eliminated
Ambriya	Atlanta, GA	Eliminated
Tampico	Los Angeles, CA	Eliminated
Cicily	Los Angeles, CA	Eliminated
Song Monroe	Paterson, NJ	Eliminated

== Episodes ==
No.	Title	Air Date	Viewership
1	"In Pursuit of Destiny"	April 5, 2016	720,000
2	"Two Left Feet"	April 12, 2016	452,000
3	"Houston, We Have a Problem"	April 19, 2016	349,000
4	"Serenity Now"	April 26, 2016	452,000
5	"Hit the Road, J."	May 3, 2016	439,000
6	"Measure Twice, Cut Once"	May 10, 2016	390,000
7	"Black Girl Magic"	May 17, 2016	402,000
8	"True Confessions"	May 24, 2016	338,000
9	"Lights, Camera, Faction"	May 31, 2016	409,000
10	"All of Us"	June 7, 2016	363,000
