= 12 Play =

1993 R. Kelly album

Studio album by R. Kelly
- Released: November 9, 1993
- Recorded: March–July 1993
- Genres: R&B; hip hop soul; new jack swing
- Length: 63:10
- Label: Jive
- Producers: R. Kelly; Timmy Allen

R. Kelly chronology
Born into the 90's (1992)	12 Play (1993)	R. Kelly (1995)

Singles from 12 Play
- 1. "Sex Me" Released: August 6, 1993; 2. "Bump N' Grind" Released: January 25, 1994; 3. "Your Body's Callin'" Released: April 1994; 4. "Summer Bunnies" Released: July 28, 1994

Professional ratings
Review scores
Source	Rating
AllMusic	5/5 stars
Chicago Tribune	2.5/4 stars
Encyclopedia of Popular Music	4/5 stars
Entertainment Weekly	C−
Los Angeles Times	2/4 stars
The Rolling Stone Album Guide	3.5/5 stars
The Village Voice	C+

"Bump n' Grind"
R. Kelly's "Bump n' Grind" from 12 Play

12 Play is the debut solo studio album by American R&B and soul singer-songwriter R. Kelly; it was released on November 9, 1993, by Jive Records. The album follows his tenure with R&B group Public Announcement, with whom he released one album, Born into the 90's (1992). It went on to top the R&B albums chart for nine weeks straight, while reaching the second position on the US Billboard 200 chart.

The album features four singles including the sexually themed singles "Bump n' Grind" (US, number 1), "Your Body's Callin'" (US, number 13), and the more overtly direct "Sex Me, Pts. 1 & 2" (US, number 20). The album serves as the first of a trilogy of albums Kelly released under the 12 Play moniker including TP-2.com (2000) and TP-3: Reloaded (2005). Since receiving an initially mixed response from critics, 12 Play has received more favorable retrospective criticism.

== Background ==
Following the success of Born into the 90's, as the member of the R&B group Public Announcement, Kelly began touring as an opening act for Gerald Levert and Glenn Jones. During the tour, Kelly said that he became frustrated with the poor lighting and empty seats during his set. To generate more attention during his set, Kelly began thinking of what would be his gimmick to take his show to the next level, something that would make people remember him. Kelly stated: "I thought about it for a couple of days, and I finally came up with a little skit, me just talking to the audience. At the point in the show where I would break down "Honey Love," I would start talking to the audience."

Can I tell you all something? Can I keep it real? Can I tell you about a dream I had last night? Well, I actually had a dream where I made love to Mary J. Blige. Hey, it was only a dream, but it was so vivid, it felt real; but in this dream, it was more than foreplay – it was 12 Play. Can I sing it for y'all? Tell y'all how it went?

The audience yelled "yes!" and Kelly's piano player accompanied him with chords. Kelly then began the countdown, "One. We'll go to my room of fun." The "12 Play" gimmick became so big that when Kelly went to radio stations to promote Born into the 90's, the DJs wanted to hear "12 Play". The demand for "12 Play" was so big that R. Kelly decided to create an album titled 12 Play. Kelly later said:

"I didn't really know if the album would be as successful as it has been, but I hoped that it would. I was really taking a chance with the concept of this album." – Kelly on the concept of the 12 Play album, 1994.

== Track listing ==
All tracks are written by R. Kelly, except "Sadie" by Joseph B. Jefferson, Bruce Hawes, and Charles Simmons.

No.	Title	Producer(s)	Length
1.	"Your Body's Callin'"	R. Kelly	4:37
2.	"Bump n' Grind"	R. Kelly	4:17
3.	"Homie Lover Friend"	R. Kelly; Allen	4:23
4.	"It Seems Like You're Ready"	R. Kelly; Timmy Allen	5:38
5.	"Freak Dat Body"	R. Kelly	3:45
6.	"I Like the Crotch on You" (includes "Intermission" beginning at 4:06)	R. Kelly	6:38
7.	"Summer Bunnies"	R. Kelly	4:15
8.	"For You"	R. Kelly	5:02
9.	"Back to the Hood of Things"	R. Kelly	3:53
10.	"Sadie"	R. Kelly	4:31
11.	"Sex Me (Part 1) / Sex Me (Part 2)" ("Part 2" begins at 4:57)	R. Kelly	11:28
12.	"12 Play" (printed as "..............." in the liner notes)	R. Kelly; Allen	5:56

== Personnel ==
Credits adapted from AllMusic.

- Timmy Allen – bass, producer
- DeAndre Boykins – rap vocals
- Bobby Broom – guitar
- Tom Coyne – mastering
- Dr. Dre – composer
- Yvonne Gage – backing vocals
- Ron Hall – bass
- Barry Hankerson – executive producer
- Bruce Hawes – composer
- Keith Henderson – guitar
- James Hoffman – digital editing
- Joseph B. Jefferson – composer
- Ray Kelley – producer
- Carey Kelly – rap vocals
- Casey Kelly – rap vocals
- R. Kelly – arranger, composer, engineer, mixing, multiple instruments, performer, producer, vocals
- Michael Logan – organ, piano
- Mike Logan – organ, piano
- Doug McBride – assistant engineer
- Peter Mokran – engineer, mixing, programming
- Michael J. Powell – guitar
- Paul Riser – string arrangements
- Robin Robinson – backing vocals
- Charles Simmons – composer
- Jim Slattery – keyboards
- Stefon Taylor – assistant engineer

== Chart positions ==
=== Weekly charts ===
Chart (1993–95)	Peak position
Australian Albums (ARIA)	142
Dutch Albums (Album Top 100)	66
UK Albums (Official Charts)	20
UK R&B Albums (Official Charts)	1
US Billboard 200	2
US Top R&B/Hip-Hop Albums (Billboard)	1

=== Year-end charts ===
Chart (1994)	Position
US Billboard 200	11
US Top R&B/Hip-Hop Albums (Billboard)	2
Chart (1995)	Position
UK Albums (OCC)	100
US Top R&B/Hip-Hop Albums (Billboard)	85

== Certifications and sales ==
Region	Certification	Certified units/sales
Canada (Music Canada)	Gold	50,000^{^}
South Africa	—	34,000
United Kingdom (BPI)	Gold	130,000
United States (RIAA)	6× Platinum	6,000,000^{^}
^{^} Shipments figures based on certification alone.

== Release history ==
Year	Label	Format
1993	Jive	CD
1993	Jive	Cassette
1993	Jive	CD (with bonus track)
2003	Jive	CD
2004	Jive	CD (with bonus track)
2005	Jive	CD (with bonus track)
2007	Jive	CD

== See also ==
- List of number-one R&B albums of 1994 (U.S.)
