= Sex Me =

Single by R. Kelly

from the album 12 Play
- Released: August 6, 1993
- Recorded: 1993
- Genre: R&B
- Length: 11:28 (Pt 1 & Pt 2); 4:57 (Part 1); 4:18 (Pt 1 Short); 6:30 (Part 2); 4:57 (Pt 2 short)
- Label: Jive
- Songwriter: Robert Kelly
- Producer: R. Kelly

R. Kelly singles chronology
| "Hey Love (Can I Have a Word)" (1993) | "Sex Me" (1993) | "Bump n' Grind" (1994) |

"Sex Me" is the first solo single by American R&B singer and songwriter R. Kelly, released on August 6, 1993, by Jive Records as the first single from his solo debut album, 12 Play (1993). The song was both written and produced by Kelly, and became his first solo success, reaching number two on the US Billboard R&B chart and numbers twenty and nineteen on the Billboard Hot 100 and Cash Box Top 100. It was also certified Gold in the US.

== Critical reception ==
Pan-European magazine Music & Media wrote, "When he uses the word "freaky", you can bet he gets physical again. The ultra-slow 'Sex Me' and the pulsator 'Freak That Body' are perfect tunes for Radio Erotica."

== Music video ==
The accompanying music video for part 1 and 2 of "Sex Me" was directed by Kim Watson.

== Uses in popular culture ==
The song is used as the lyrics for Chris Brown's 2014 song "Songs on 12 Play" from his album X.

== Charts ==
=== Weekly charts ===
| Chart (1993–1994) | Peak position |
|---|---|
| UK Singles (OCC) | 75 |
| UK Dance (Music Week) | 23 |
| UK Club Chart (Music Week) | 41 |
| US Billboard Hot 100 | 20 |
| US Hot Dance Music/Maxi-Singles Sales (Billboard) | 27 |
| US Rhythmic Top 40 (Billboard) | 27 |
| US Hot R&B/Hip-Hop Singles & Tracks (Billboard) | 8 |
| US Cash Box Top 100 | 19 |

=== Year-end charts ===
| Chart (1994) | Position |
|---|---|
| US R&B/Hip Hop Chart (Billboard) | 54 |
