= All of Us in Our Night =

Studio album by Modern Skirts
- Released: January 20, 2008
- Genre: Rock
- Label: 02. Records
- Producer: John Morand

Modern Skirts chronology
Finest Worksongs: Athens Bands Play the Music of R.E.M (2001)	All of Us in Our Night (2008)	Happy 81 (2010)

All Of Us In Our Night is the second full-length album released by Modern Skirts. The album was released in October 2008 and features Mike Mills from R.E.M.

== Track listing ==
1. "Chanel"
2. "Soft Pedals"
3. "Chokehold"
4. "Radio Breaks"
5. "Yugo"
6. "Face Down"
7. "Conversational"
8. "Astronaut"
9. "Eveready"
10. "Motorcade"
11. "Mrs."
12. "Like Lunatics"
