= All of Us (June's Diary song) =

Single by June's Diary
- Released: June 7, 2016
- Genre: R&B, Soul
- Length: 3:44
- Label: Epic; Sony
- Songwriter(s): Naiquan Greene
- Producer(s): Kelly Rowland (co.)

June's Diary singles chronology
"All of Us" (2016)	"L.A.N.C.E." (2016)

"All of Us" is a song by American girl group June's Diary, released as a buzz single on June 7, 2016. It was written Naiquan Greene and co-produced by Kelly Rowland. The song was originally released under artist name 'Chasing Destiny' due to the fact the group had not decided their name yet.

== Reception ==
=== Critical response ===
The song has been well-received by critics. BET described the song as "The track can be summed up as a gangsta love song. Filled with all of the beautiful harmonies that we expect from the group. There's a twist, though. If the man in question decides to break any one of their hearts, they're going to call each other to give him what he deserves. Basically they're "coming with [their] best friend and [their] mommy and [their] cousins." Digital Spy's Lewis Corner describing the song as a "deliciously urban jam".

Mike Wass from Idolator praised the group and the song "Chasing Destiny was lovingly put together by Kelly Rowland on the similarly-titled BET reality series and the ladies do their mentor proud on debut single 'All Of Us' Shyann Roberts, Kristal Lyndriette, Brienna DeVlugt, Ashly Williams and Gabrielle Carreiro stand out from the usual talent show graduates with their powerful vocals (all these women can sing) and their soulful R&B sound, which is something of a throwback to the glory days of En Vogue and SWV."

== Track listing ==
Digital download

1. "All of Us" – 3:44

=== Release history ===
Country	Date	Format	Label	Ref.
Worldwide	7 June 2016	Digital download	Epic Sony Music	
