= Slow Dance (Hey Mr. DJ) =

Single by R. Kelly and Public Announcement

from the album Born into the 90's
- Released: August 1992
- Recorded: 1991
- Genre: R&B
- Length: 5:03
- Label: Jive
- Songwriter: Robert Kelly
- Producer: R. Kelly

R. Kelly and Public Announcement singles chronology
"Honey Love" (1992)	"Slow Dance (Hey Mr. DJ)" (1992)	"Hey Love (Can I Have a Word)" (1992)

Slow Dance (Hey Mr. DJ) is a song by R. Kelly with Public Announcement from the album Born into the 90's (1992). It was released as a single by Jive Records in August 1992.

The song spent one week at number-one on the Billboard R&B chart and became a minor pop hit on the Billboard Hot 100, peaking at number forty-three. This was the second number-one R&B hit for Kelly; the previous being "Honey Love" from the same album.

An accompanying music video was released in August 1992.

== Charts ==
=== Weekly charts ===
Chart (1992)	Peak position
US Billboard Hot 100	43
US Hot R&B/Hip-Hop Songs (Billboard)	1
US Rhythmic Airplay (Billboard)	17

=== Year-end charts ===
Chart (1992)	Position
US Hot R&B/Hip-Hop Songs (Billboard)	19

== See also ==
- List of number-one R&B singles of 1992 (U.S.)
