= Body Bumpin' (Yippie-Yi-Yo) =

Single by Public Announcement

from the album All Work, No Play
- Released: January 27, 1998
- Recorded: 1997
- Genre: R&B
- Length: 4:33
- Label: A&M
- Songwriters: Feloney Davis, Euclid Gray, Monica Gray

Public Announcement singles chronology
"Hey Love (Can I Have a Word)" (1992)	"Body Bumpin' (Yippie-Yi-Yo)" (1998)	"Mamacita" (2000)

"Body Bumpin' (Yippie-Yi-Yo)" is a song by American R&B group Public Announcement. It was released as the first single from their sophomore studio album All Work, No Play (1998). It became Public Announcement's highest charting song on the US Hot 100 chart where it peaked at number 5. The song made the Top 40 chart in the UK, peaking at number 38. This is the first song released by the group without singer R. Kelly.

== Music video ==
The video is directed by Public Announcement. There is both a video for the remix and the original.

== Formats and track listings ==
- Digital download
1. "Body Bumpin' (Yippie-Yi-Yo)" – 4:33
2. "Body Bumpin' (Yippie-Yi-Yo) [R&B Remix]" – 5:29
3. "Y To the Yippie (Step On)" – 5:27
4. "Body, Bumpin' (Yippie-Yi-Yo) [Mike Dunn's Deep Soul Bump Mix]" – 8:07
5. "Body Bumpin' (Yippie-Yi-Yo)" [DJ Kelly G's House Mix] – 8:14

== Credits and personnel ==
Credits adapted from AllMusic.

- Feloney Davis – Composer, Primary Artist
- Euclid Gray – Composer, Primary Artist
- Monica Gray – Composer, Primary Artist

== Charts and certifications ==
=== Weekly charts ===
Chart (1998)	Peak position
New Zealand (Recorded Music NZ)	11
UK Singles (OCC)	38
US Billboard Hot 100	5
US Hot R&B/Hip-Hop Songs (Billboard)	4
US Hot Dance Music/Maxi-Singles Sales (Billboard)	4
US Rhythmic Airplay (Billboard)	4

=== Year-end charts ===
Chart (1998)	Position
US Billboard Hot 100	24
US Hot R&B/Hip-Hop Songs	16

=== Certifications ===
Region	Certification	Certified units/sales
United States (RIAA)	Platinum	1,300,000
