= Travon Potts =

American songwriter and record producer (born 1970)

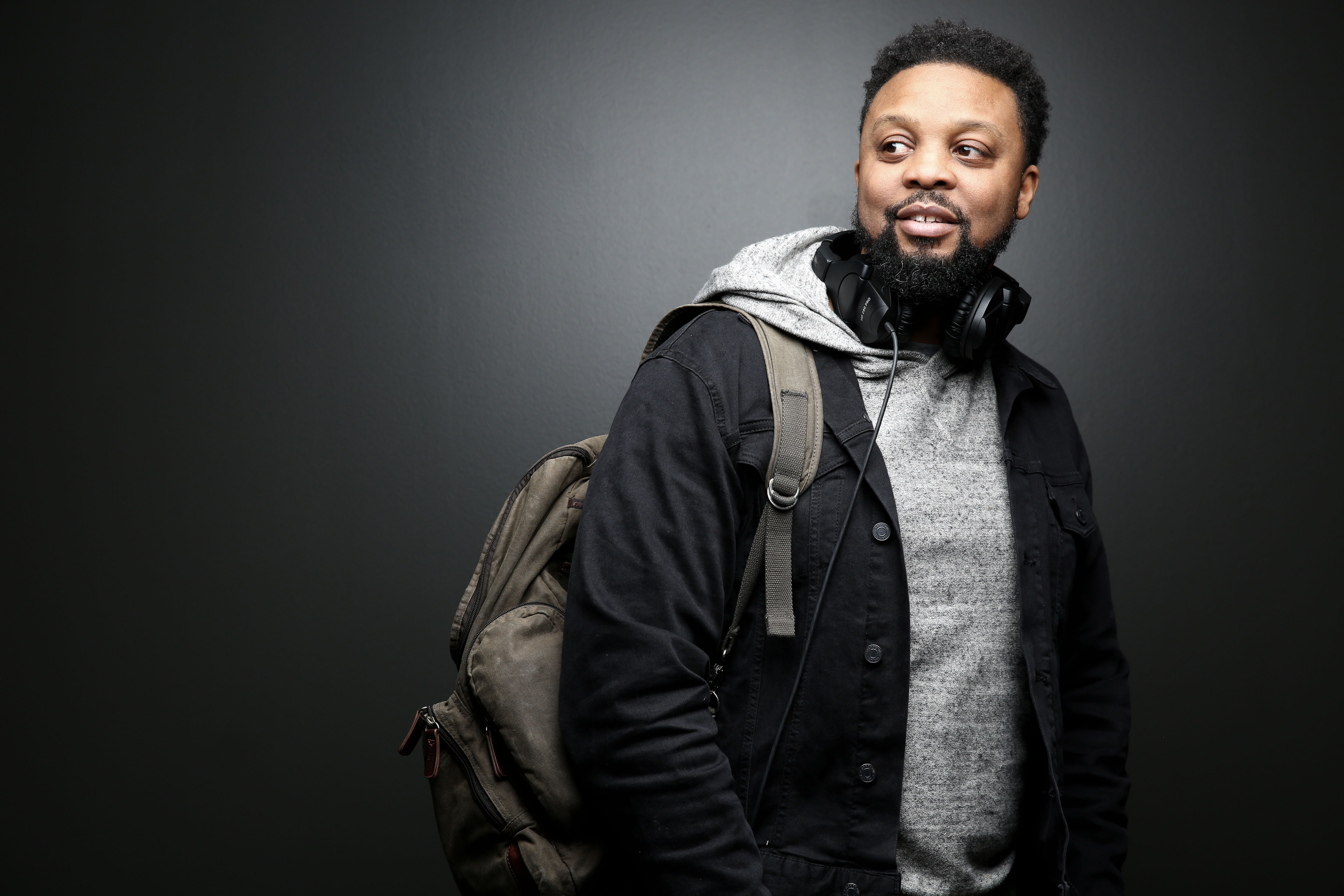

Background information
- Born: Travon Marcel Potts; June 3, 1970 (age 55)
- Origin: Los Angeles, California, United States
- Genres: Pop; R&B; soul; contemporary christian; gospel
- Occupations: Producer; songwriter
- Instrument: Piano
- Years active: 1990–present
- Website: www.travonpotts.com

Travon Marcel Potts (born June 3, 1970) is an American songwriter and record producer. He has a prolific discography. Potts has written for artists such as Monica, Christina Aguilera, Ahmed Chawki, Kenny Lattimore, Anastacia, Eternal, BeBe Winans, Trin-i-tee 5:7, and Public Announcement. He was a staff writer/producer for Nadir RedOne Khayat's RedOne Productions LLC. Potts co-wrote the 2014 theme song "Time of Our Lives" for beIN Sports.

Potts scored and wrote original music for Lifetime Network's Whitney, directed by Angela Bassett. His music has also appeared in BMF (TV series), Swagger (TV series), Power Book III: Raising Kanan, Greenleaf, and The Chi. Additionally, he has composed for several holiday and television movies, including Adventures in Christmasing (VH1), The First Noelle (BET), Out of Bounds (Tubi), Christmas Ringer (BET), BeBe Winans' We Three Kings (Lifetime), Desire: A Temptation Story (Lifetime), Fame: A Temptation Story (Lifetime), Christmas Everyday (Lifetime), and Sugar Mama (Lifetime).

His early TV and film work includes Miracle in Lane 2 (Disney), All About the Benjamins, Soul Plane, and Up TV's A Cross to Bear.

== Early life ==
At the age of 12, Potts began playing piano for his church choir, Metropolitan Missionary Baptist Church in Los Angeles, California.

In high school, he began jazz training and started playing for the high school jazz band. At the age of 19, he co-wrote and co-produced his first song "Consider Me Yours" for Virgin recording artist Kipper Jones.

== Ministry ==
After having success under the Silvercrest Entertainment brand, Travon's focus shifted toward music ministry. A young gospel singing duo, ages 13 and 11 at the time, were brought to him as a possible project for development (Charles and Taylor). After completing a demo package and shopping to different record labels, Jackie Patillo, GM of Integrity Music/Sony, signed Charles and Taylor to a record deal. Charles and Taylor went on to receive a Dove Award nomination for their self-titled project produced by Potts. With this new focus on music ministry, Travon and his wife and business partner formed a new brand by the name of Providence Media Group.

== Career ==
In 1997, Potts worked with songwriter and producer Rhett Lawrence. The musical relationship between Rhett and Potts led to songs for BeBe Winans ("Thank You"), The Honeys, and Eternal. Eternal scored an overseas hit from this writing team ("Angel of Mine"). Monica also recorded and released "Angel of Mine" as a single from her The Boy Is Mine CD. "Angel of Mine" went on to reach #1 on the Billboard pop chart for four weeks. Potts went on to form his own production company, Silvercrest Entertainment. Under the Silvercrest Entertainment brand, Potts wrote and produced songs for Christina Aguilera ("Blessed"), Public Announcement ("It's About Time" #5 R&B, "Mamacita" #7 Pop), Trin-i-tee 5:7 ("Spiritual Love", "My Body" Top 10 gospel, "Rescue Me") and LaShell Griffin ("Faith", "Get Away").

Potts, under the Providence Media Group brand, was producer and executive producer for Charles & Taylor's self-titled Integrity Gospel / Sony release in July 2005. Providence Media Group then produced "Once Again Mike Phillips" for Hidden Beach Recordings artist Mike Phillips. Also under this brand, work began on the next project for CCM / Gospel artist Javen. Javen is well known for his work and ministry at Without Walls in Tampa, Florida, under Pastors Paula and Randy White. Travon and Tandria saw the vision to expand youth music ministry in Gospel and CCM within Providence Media Group. They created the group The Net, formed to train musically talented youth to use their talents for music ministry.

Potts and Providence Media Group partnered with Destiny Style Records in Marietta, Georgia, to produce Destiny Style Record artists. Potts went on to produce the Gospel Top 10 single ("His Will") for Destiny Praise on their self-titled album. Potts left Destiny Style Records to expand and formed Clean Energy Entertainment with Tandria. Under this production company, Potts went on to write ("One") with American Idol finalist Chris Sligh. In 2011, Potts was brought on as music supervisor and scored the film A Cross To Bear. In 2013, Potts left Universal Music Publishing. In 2014, Potts joined RedOne's production team. That year, he co-wrote the theme for beIN's network with famed songwriter-producer Nadir RedOne Khayat.

=== Film / TV ===
Potts has gone on to score and write original music for Whitney (Lifetime), directed by Angela Bassett. Potts' music has appeared in Greenleaf, BMF (TV series), Swagger (TV series), Our Kind of People, Power Book III: Raising Kanan, and The Chi. Potts was Music Supervisor for the holiday TV movie Adventures in Christmasing on VH1, starring Kim Fields, who also served as Executive Producer. He also scored BET's TV Christmas movie The First Noelle.

Additionally, Potts composed music for several other television movies, including Out of Bounds (Tubi), Christmas Ringer (BET), BeBe Winans' We Three Kings (Lifetime), Desire: A Temptation Story (Lifetime), Fame: A Temptation Story (Lifetime), Christmas Everyday (Lifetime), and Suga Mama (Lifetime).
