= Mr. Lee (rapper) =

American musician (born 1968)

- Born: Lee Haggard Jr. 1968 (age 57–58)
- Origin: Chicago, Illinois, United States
- Genres: Hip hop; house
- Instrument: Turntables
- Years active: 1986–present

Mr. Lee (born Lee Haggard Jr. in 1968), sometimes credited as Lee Haggard or Mr. Lee & Kompany, is an American hip-house rapper, producer and DJ from Chicago, Illinois. He is known in the Chicago house music scene as one of the pioneers who brought hip hop to the genre, which would later be coined as hip house.

Mr. Lee charted three times on the Billboard Hot Dance Music/Club Play chart with "Get Busy" (No. 2, 1989), "Pump That Body" (No. 1, 1990) and "Get Off" (No. 32, 1992). His tracks "Pump Up London" (No. 64, 1988) and "Get Busy" (No. 41, 1989) featured in the UK Singles Chart. Mr. Lee released two albums, Get Busy in 1990 and I Wanna Rock Right Now in 1992.

== Discography ==
=== Albums ===
- Get Busy (1990)
- I Wanna Rock Right Now (1992)

=== Singles ===
Year	Single	Peak chart positions								Album
Year	Single	US Dance	US R&B/HH	AUS	NZ	NLD	BEL (FL)	GER	UK	Album
1986	"Shoot Your Best Shot" (as Mr. Lee & Kompany) (US only)	—	—	—	—	—	—	—	—	singles only
1987	"Can You Feel It" (as Mr. Lee & Kompany) (US only)	—	—	—	—	—	—	—	—	singles only
1987	"I Can't Forget"	—	—	—	—	—	—	—	88	singles only
1987	"Come to House" (US only)	—	—	—	—	—	—	—	—	singles only
1988	"House This House" (US only)	—	—	—	—	—	—	—	—	singles only
1988	"Pump Up Chicago / Pump Up London"	—	—	—	—	—	—	—	64	singles only
1988	"Acid Fantaslee" (US only)	—	—	—	—	—	—	—	—	singles only
1989	"Rock This Place"	—	—	—	—	—	—	—	—	singles only
1989	"Get Busy"	2	—	159	50	5	11	18	41	Get Busy
1990	"Pump That Body"	1	—	139	41	7	21	—	79	Get Busy
1990	"I Like the Girls"	—	—	165	—	34	36	—	—	Get Busy
1990	"Make It Funky" (Europe only)	—	—	—	—	47	—	—	—	Get Busy
1992	"Hey Love (Can I Have a Word)" (featuring R. Kelly)	—	15	183	23	—	—	—	—	I Wanna Rock Right Now
1992	"Take Me Higher" (Europe only)	—	—	—	—	—	—	—	—	I Wanna Rock Right Now
1992	"Get Off"	32	—	—	—	—	—	—	—	I Wanna Rock Right Now
1992	"Do It to Me" (US only)	—	—	—	—	—	—	—	—	I Wanna Rock Right Now
"—" denotes releases that did not chart or were not released.

== See also ==
- List of number-one dance hits (United States)
- List of artists who reached number one on the US Dance chart
