= Public Announcement =

American R&B band

- Also known as: PA
- Origin: Chicago, Illinois, U.S.
- Genres: R&B, new jack swing
- Years active: 1991–2026
- Labels: Twoguard Music Group -TMG, Jive, A&M, Epic
- Past members: R. Kelly; Fellony Davis; Andre Boykins; Earl Robinson; Ricky Webster; Big Mel; Euclid Gray; Raymond Price; Glenn Wright; Ace Watkins; Tim Campbell; Mar Kimber

Public Announcement was an American R&B group, which also joined R. Kelly in 1991 after the R&B artist fired his former group MGM. They teamed with the singer for their collaboration album Born into the 90's (1992). The group was known for R&B hit songs like "She's Got That Vibe", "Honey Love", "Slow Dance (Hey Mr. DJ)", "Dedicated", "Body Bumpin' (Yippie-Yi-Yo)", and "Mamacita".

== Career ==
In 1999, a song called "John Doe", from their album Don't Hold Back on Epic was released and was a minor R&B/Hip-Hop hit, which led to the album release being delayed. A few months later, in 2000, a new lead single called "Mamacita" was released. It was a moderate success entering number 39 on the Billboard Hot 100. After that, "John Doe" was re-released and went on to enter the Hot 100 at number 95. Another single named "Man Ain't Supposed To Cry" was a top forty R&B/Hip-Hop hit.

== Former members ==
- R. Kelly – (1991–1993)
- Andre Boykins – (1991–1994)
- Raymond Price – (1991–1992)
- Earl Robinson – (1991–2006) (Died 2025)
- Ricky Webster – (1991–1994)
- Big Mel – (1993–1994)
- Euclid Gray – (1996–1999)
- Mark Shaw – (2003–2018)
- Luther Whitener – (1991–1994)
- Glenn (O’Neil) Wright – (1996–2024)
- Ace Watkins – (1999–2025)

== Discography ==
- 1992: Born into the 90's (with R. Kelly)
- 1998: All Work, No Play
- 2001: Don't Hold Back
- 2006: When the Smoke Clears

== Official tours ==
Co-headlining

- 60653 Tour (w/ R. Kelly) (1993)
- Seagrams Gin Tour W/Mystical
- 90's R&B Tour
