= Billboard Year-End Hot R&B/Hip-Hop Songs of 2009 =

American music chart

This is a list of Billboard magazine's Top Hot R&B/Hip-Hop Songs of 2009.

No.	Title	Artist(s)
1	"Blame It"	Jamie Foxx featuring T-Pain
2	"Pretty Wings"	Maxwell
3	"Break Up"	Mario
4	"Best I Ever Had"	Drake
5	"Rockin' That Shit"	The-Dream
6	"Single Ladies (Put a Ring on It)"	Beyoncé
7	"Turnin Me On"	Keri Hilson featuring Lil Wayne
8	"She Got Her Own"	Ne-Yo featuring Fabolous and Jamie Foxx
9	"SoBeautiful"	Musiq Soulchild
10	"Last Chance"	Ginuwine
11	"Knock You Down"	Keri Hilson featuring Kanye West and Ne-Yo
12	"Every Girl"	Young Money
13	"God in Me"	Mary Mary featuring Kierra Sheard
14	"Ego"	Beyoncé
15	"Mad"	Ne-Yo
16	"If This Isn't Love"	Jennifer Hudson
17	"Live Your Life"	T.I. featuring Rihanna
18	"Successful"	Drake featuring Trey Songz and Lil Wayne
19	"On the Ocean"	K'Jon
20	"Birthday Sex"	Jeremih
21	"Trust"	Keyshia Cole and Monica
22	"Diva"	Beyoncé
23	"Miss Independent"	Ne-Yo
24	"Ain't I"	Yung L.A. featuring T.I. and Young Dro
25	"Boyfriend #2"	Pleasure P
26	"There Goes My Baby"	Charlie Wilson
27	"I Need a Girl"	Trey Songz
28	"IfULeave"	Musiq Soulchild
29	"Spotlight"	Jennifer Hudson
30	"Dead and Gone"	T.I. featuring Justin Timberlake
31	"Chopped 'n' Skrewed"	T-Pain featuring Ludacris
32	"Trading Places"	Usher
33	"Just Like Me"	Jamie Foxx featuring T.I.
34	"Kiss Me thru the Phone"	Soulja Boy featuring Sammie
35	"You Complete Me"	Keyshia Cole
36	"Pop Champagne"	Jim Jones and Ron Browz featuring Juelz Santana
37	"Wasted"	Gucci Mane featuring Plies
38	"Throw It in the Bag"	Fabolous featuring The-Dream
39	"Heartless"	Kanye West
40	"Cool"	Anthony Hamilton featuring David Banner
41	"Here I Stand"	Usher
42	"Wetter"	Twista featuring Erika Shevon
43	"Green Light"	John Legend featuring André 3000
44	"Epiphany"	Chrisette Michele
45	"Playa Cardz Right"	Keyshia Cole featuring 2Pac
46	"Run This Town"	Jay-Z featuring Rihanna and Kanye West
47	"Under"	Pleasure P
48	"Ice Cream Paint Job"	Dorrough
49	"Bad Habits"	Maxwell
50	"Turn My Swag On"	Soulja Boy
51	"Always Strapped"	Birdman featuring Lil Wayne
52	"Beep"	Bobby Valentino featuring Yung Joc
53	"Whatever You Like"	T.I.
54	"Mrs. Officer"	Lil Wayne featuring Bobby Valentino and Kidd Kidd
55	"Bust Your Windows"	Jazmine Sullivan
56	"The Point of It All"	Anthony Hamilton
57	"When It Hurts"	Avant
58	"Need U Bad"	Jazmine Sullivan
59	"Day 'n' Nite"	Kid Cudi
60	"Magnificent"	Rick Ross featuring John Legend
61	"Number One"	R. Kelly featuring Keri Hilson
62	"Put It on Ya"	Plies featuring Chris J
63	"Obsessed"	Mariah Carey
64	"Swag Surfin"	Fast Life Yungstaz
65	"From My Heart to Yours"	Laura Izibor
66	"Stanky Legg"	GS Boyz
67	"Never Ever"	Ciara featuring Young Jeezy
68	"Forever"	Drake, Kanye West, Lil Wayne and Eminem
69	"Can't Believe It"	T-Pain featuring Lil Wayne
70	"Halle Berry (She's Fine)"	Hurricane Chris featuring Superstarr
71	"Lions, Tigers & Bears"	Jazmine Sullivan
72	"The Sweetest Love"	Robin Thicke
73	"Can't Live Without You"	Charlie Wilson
74	"Regret"	LeToya featuring Ludacris
75	"5 Star"	Yo Gotti
76	"One More Drink"	Ludacris featuring T-Pain
77	"I Invented Sex"	Trey Songz featuring Drake
78	"Heaven Sent"	Keyshia Cole
79	"Halo"	Beyoncé
80	"Empire State of Mind"	Jay-Z and Alicia Keys
81	"LOL :-)"	Trey Songz featuring Gucci Mane and Soulja Boy
82	"Chocolate High"	India Arie featuring Musiq Soulchild
83	"You're a Jerk"	New Boyz
84	"Never Give You Up"	Raphael Saadiq featuring Stevie Wonder and CJ Hilton
85	"Not Anymore"	LeToya
86	"It's Yours"	J. Holiday
87	"I Look to You"	Whitney Houston
88	"Make tha Trap Say Aye"	OJ da Juiceman featuring Gucci Mane
89	"Papers"	Usher
90	"If I Were a Boy"	Beyoncé
91	"Blame It on Me"	Chrisette Michele
92	"Lost"	Gorilla Zoe
93	"Imma Star (Everywhere We Are)"	Jeremih
94	"Swagga Like Us"	Jay-Z and T.I. featuring Kanye West and Lil Wayne
95	"Doesn't Mean Anything"	Alicia Keys
96	"Plenty Money"	Plies
97	"Download"	Lil' Kim featuring T-Pain and Charlie Wilson
98	"Imma Put It on Her"	Day26 featuring Diddy and Yung Joc
99	"The One"	Mary J. Blige featuring Drake
100	"Trick'n"	Mullage

== See also ==
- 2009 in music
- Billboard Year-End Hot 100 singles of 2009
- Billboard Year-End Hot Rap Songs of 2009
- List of number-one R&B singles of 2009 (U.S.)
