= Pillowtalk =

Single by Zayn

from the album Mind of Mine
- Released: 29 January 2016
- Recorded: 2015
- Genre: Alternative R&B; synth-rock; electronic rock; dance-rock
- Length: 3:22
- Label: RCA
- Songwriters: Zayn Malik; Levi Lennox; Anthony Hannides; Michael Hannides; Joe Garrett
- Producer: Levi Lennox

Zayn singles chronology
"Pillowtalk" (2016)	"Like I Would" (2016)

Music video
- "Pillowtalk" on YouTube

"Pillowtalk" (stylised in all caps) is the debut solo single by English singer Zayn, from his debut solo album Mind of Mine (2016). It was released on 29 January 2016 through RCA Records as the lead single from the album. His first single released after his departure from One Direction in March 2015, Zayn co-wrote the track with Anthony Hannides, Michael Hannides, Joe Garrett, and its producer Levi Lennox. The Bouha Kazmi-directed music video was released alongside the song and features his girlfriend at the time, American model Gigi Hadid. It debuted at number one on the UK Singles Chart and the US Billboard Hot 100, making Malik the first British artist to debut at number one in the US with a debut single.

== Background and release ==
After signing a recording deal with RCA Records, Zayn gave several interviews with music magazines, such as The Fader and Billboard, to talk about his debut record. He stated "life experiences have been the influences for the album and just stuff that I've been through, especially in the last five years." He said the record will musically lean towards R&B, but will also have some tunes leaning towards R&B-rock or reggae. Zayn's solo debut album Mind of Mine was released on 25 March 2016. On 24 January 2016, Zayn revealed the release date and promotional cover-art of the lead single "Pillowtalk" through Twitter. It is Zayn's debut solo single after he left One Direction in March 2015. Zayn wrote the song shortly after leaving the group, in collaboration with co-writers Mike and Anthony Hannides. Speaking about his new single with The Sunday Times, Zayn said that "Pillowtalk" was written about sex, which he described as "so pure, so dirty and raw," adding, "everybody has sex, and it’s something people wanna hear about. It’s part of everybody’s life, a very big part of life. And you don’t want to sweep it under the carpet." The song was inspired about and written shortly before he split from his ex-fiancé, Little Mix's Perrie Edwards. Subsequently, "Pillowtalk" was made available for digital download in most countries worldwide via the iTunes Store on 29 January 2016. It achieved worldwide success by topping the charts in a variety of markets, with combined sales and track-equivalent streams of 8 million units according to IFPI.

== Remix ==
An acoustic version of the track, "Pillowtalk", was released on 3 February 2016.

On Snapchat, Zayn revealed a snippet of a "Pillowtalk" remix featuring American rapper Lil Wayne, which was later released as "Pillowtalk Remix" for digital download on 25 February 2016; it is a hip hop remix with a rap verse from Wayne and an extra rap-sing verse by Zayn. The song has the first line of the second verse of the original song when Zayn says "Pillow talk" and then replaces the rest of the second verse to Wayne's verse. It replaces the bridge of the original song to a rap-sing verse from Zayn and then after Zayn's rap-sing verse to Wayne's bridge recapping the original chorus line from Zayn, "Its our paradise and its our war zone" twice.

An alternate version of the remix was leaked in May 2016. This version replaced Zayn's rap-sing verse with a verse from Tory Lanez. It is not an official remix. The original version of "Pillowtalk" has been included in the compilation album Now That's What I Call Music! 93.

== Composition and lyrical interpretation ==
"['Pillowtalk'] is about sex – there is obviously sex in a relationship, though its not the whole incentive of the song. The actual intent of the song is even though you have great times in a relationship, you have really bad times as well but that's what makes it worthwhile because you learn things and you go through experiences that bring you closer together."

— Zayn in an interview with Elvis Duran and the Morning Show.

"Pillowtalk" is an R&B slow jam, being the genre showcased in form of alternative R&B. Also described as a downtempo electronic, it features a smooth pop-R&B production, and heavy beats. According to music critics, the song represents a change from the mainly pop influences of his previous releases as a boyband member.

"Pillowtalk" was written in common time in the key of B major, with a moderate tempo of 126 beats per minute. The verses center around the chords of E major and F♯ major, with the vocal melody in the verses being pentatonic. Zayn's vocal performance makes use of ad-libs, at points using triplets against the prevailing tempo. The song demonstrates Zayn's tenor vocal range, particularly with the chorus.

Its lyrics discuss the way that love and passion can turn abruptly into recklessness, described by The Guardian as a "theatrical interpretation of intimacy and romance." Zayn uses billowy vocals and buttery voice in the song. He goes from soft lines in the pre-chorus, "I love to wake up next to you," to explicit content in the chorus: "in the bed all day / fucking and fighting on / It's a paradise and it's a war zone;" he sings about the pain that comes with being lovers.

"Pillowtalk (the living room session)" features Malik's vocals with an acoustic guitar backing. "Pillowtalk Remix" is a hip hop remix that features rapping by Lil Wayne as well as rapping and rap-singing by Zayn, while the beats and melody have also been reworked to a hip hop style with additional hip-hop producer Jaegen.

== Critical reception ==
"Pillowtalk" received widespread critical acclaim for its production, lyrics and Zayn's vocals. Writing for Forbes, Hugh McIntyre commented the song "is decidedly grown up, complete with plenty of x-rated words and adult imagery and themes. This isn’t another simple tune about broken hearts; it’s about love being both a paradise and a warzone. The song may be about similar situations, but Zayn is feeling—or expressing—things differently now." Fuse's Jason Lipshutz described "Pillowtalk" as "a sexy, engrossing R&B track." Brennan Carley of Spin praised the lyrics and Zayn's vocals, stating he "demonstrates a mastery on modern R&B within seconds. There’s passion in his voice, an instrument unencumbered and unshaven for the first time." For The Guardian's Harriet Gibsone, it is a "slow, minimalist and lusty explosion of testosterone, a fountain of champagne and dodgy aftershave. It is a deliberate – and understandable – step into a more austere artistic guise." The Guardian chose "Pillowtalk" as their pick of the week, stating that "against all odds, Zayn Malik’s debut single is shockingly good." The Irish Times also chose it as their track of the week, describing it as "slick" and "nouveau R&B (like Miguel) with a blogwave backing."

For Stereogum, Tom Breihan called it a "sleek, immaculately constructed piece of moody." In Digital Spy, Lewis Corner gave the song four-out-of-five stars, writing "Zayn's clear vocal tone – at its very best on this – along with a big chorus and brain-niggling melody, keeps it sexy and fun without being sordid." He musically compared the "seductive R&B" track to The Weeknd's sounds and Justin Timberlake's early solo work, and concluded it isn't the "same old pop shit" but "the new British male superstar you hadn't realised you've been waiting for." Lucas Villa of AXS wrote that the song "might not be [Zayn's] Justin Timberlake 'Cry Me a River' breakthrough just yet but it's a sweet something that will surely satisfy his older fans in the meanwhile." Brittany Spanos in Rolling Stone called it a "smooth, sexy pop song." Joe Lynch of Billboard noted that the song drops "One Direction's MOR pop for the more critically respected PBR&B". Another Billboard review wrote that "Malik has left bubblegum pop behind" and from "here on, it's slick R&B."

Alex Abad-Santos of Vox found that the topic contains "shopworn clichés, making the song feel like it's marketed and packaged for young ears" but concluded "Zayn's billowy, swirling vocals sell it so well that 'Pillowtalk' becomes something better than it first set out to be." Christopher Weingarten in Rolling Stone wrote "there's nothing particularly special about his single" and found the lyrics "awkward" but concluded the song may be "important for R&B's future" as it "proves that the watery sound of alternative-leaning R&B has way more legs than the cult of personality built around the Weeknd." Newsweek said the "track has an epic crashing chorus that’s raunchy and romantic in equal measure, with jazzy electronic elements that don’t overpower the 23-year-old’s formidable vocal chops." AllMusic said the song features "his strong vocals over distinctly more adult-themed alt-R&B similar to The Weeknd and Miguel." Magdalen Jenne of PopMatters said "Pillowtalk" is "hands down the best pop single of 2016 so far." Rolling Stone named "Pillowtalk" one of the 30 best songs of the first half of 2016, writing "Like his AWOL boy band forefathers, Zayn Malik decided to use R&B and sex appeal to launch his post-One Direction. This Number One hit is a smooth, seductive lover's croon." Billboard ranked "Pillowtalk" at number 37 on their "100 Best Pop Songs of 2016" list. Spin staff ranked it as the 16th best boy-band solo debut single.

== Chart performance ==
"Pillowtalk" debuted at number one on the UK Singles Chart, with 112,497 sales and about 4.972 million streams for the week, Its subsequent UK sales were 82,264 copies in its second week, 71,578 copies in the third week, 58,732 copies the fourth week, and 49,604 copies the fifth week.

Overseas, it debuted at number one in Ireland and Australia, where it is the year's first song to enter at the top of the singles chart, and it debuted at number one on the Finland download chart. It also debuted at number one in Canada, Greece, Portugal, and Slovakia, and reached number one in Hungary, New Zealand, Singapore and Sweden. Worldwide, Zayn had the highest first-day and weekly streams for a debut artist. As of 20 April 2016, the song has received 330 million streams on Spotify and Shazam.

"Pillowtalk" debuted atop the US Billboard Hot 100 for the chart issue dated 20 February 2016, becoming the 25th song ever to debut at number one on the chart. This makes him the first UK artist to debut at number one on the Hot 100 with a first charted single, and the third UK act to start at the summit (following Elton John's "Candle in the Wind 1997" and Adele's "Hello"). It also marks the first number one debut for an artist's first Hot 100 entry since Baauer's "Harlem Shake" (2 March 2013). "Pillowtalk" charted higher than any One Direction single, the highest being number two for "Best Song Ever" in 2013. Zayn is the first one-time member of a Hot 100-charting boy band to score a number one with a debut single since George Harrison, the former Beatle who launched with "My Sweet Lord" in 1970. The single's performance propelled Zayn to number six on the Billboard Artist 100 chart. "Pillowtalk" replaced Justin Bieber's "Love Yourself" at the summit of the Hot 100 for one week, before dropping to number seven the following week, and then rebounding to number six for the next five weeks. Following the release of Mind of Mine, "Pillowtalk" rebounded to number four on the Hot 100. It reached the Mainstream Top 40 top spot for the chart issue dated 7 May 2016, surpassing One Direction's number-three peak (with "What Makes You Beautiful" in 2012). Zayn is the first former boy band member to top the Mainstream Top 40 with a debut entry since former Menudo member Ricky Martin's "Livin' la Vida Loca" in 1999.

In the United States, "Pillowtalk" sold 267,000 copies in its first week, along with 22.3 million streams, the fourth-largest streaming start ever, opening atop the Digital Songs and Streaming Songs charts; it also debuted at number one on the subscription services-based On-Demand Songs chart, with 12.7 million on-demand streams. It garnered 5.9 million in all-format radio audience in the first three days of the Hot 100's airplay tracking week, and boasted 17 million in radio audience for the week. It was the year's second biggest first-week seller. "Pillowtalk" had the fastest airplay gain on radio in its second week, when it gained 64% on the Radio Songs chart with 29 million audience impressions, and had 16.9 million streams that week, followed by 17.4 million streams and 38 million audience impressions in its third week, 46 million audience impressions in the fourth week, and 17.2 million streams and 53 million audience impressions the fifth week. It became the top Airplay Gainer in its sixth week, with a 21 percent gain to 65 million audience impressions, followed by 69 million audiences impressions in its seventh week, and 17 million streams in its eighth week. By June 2016, it had sold 1.288 million in the US, according to Nielsen SoundScan.

== Music video ==
=== Synopsis ===
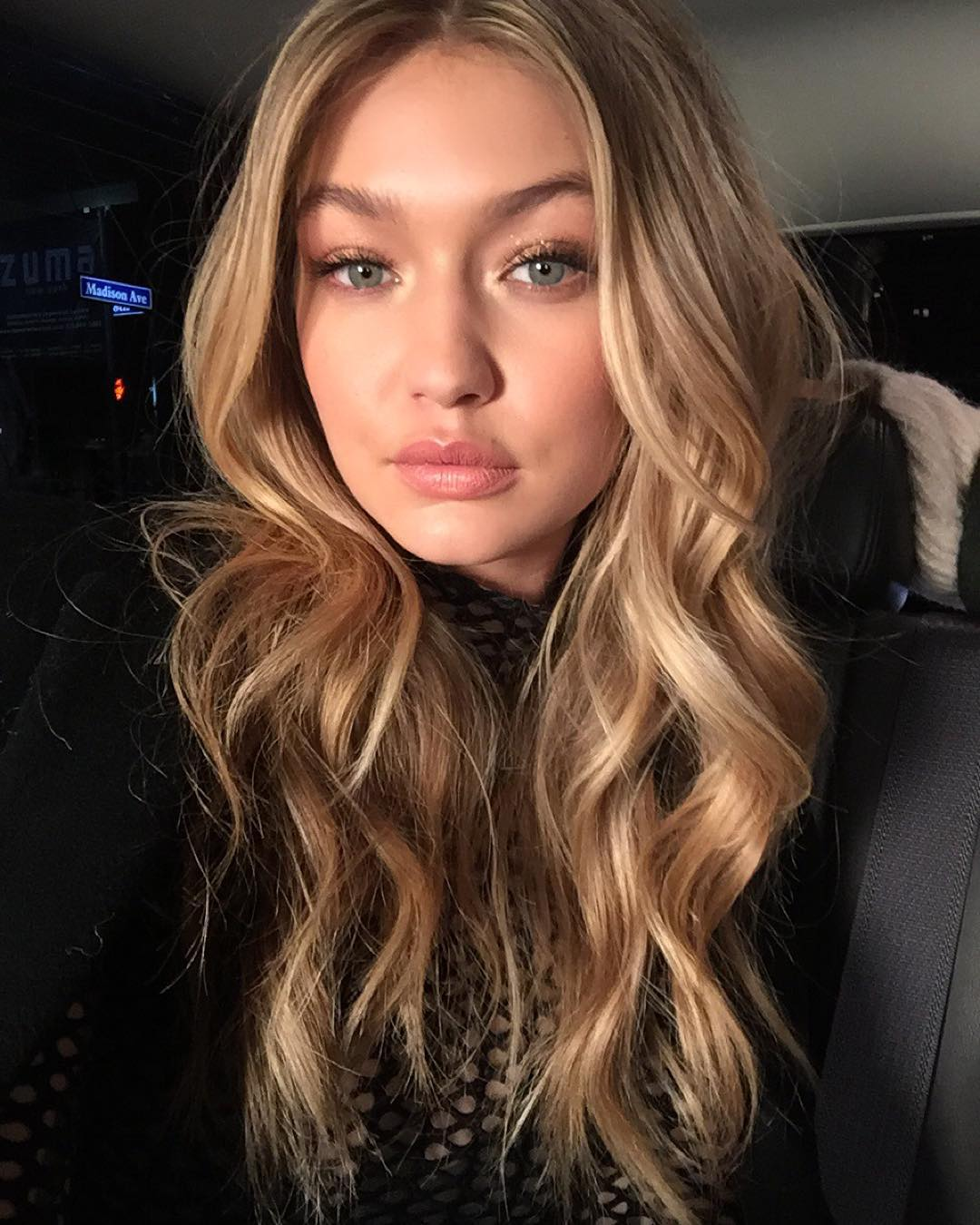
American model Gigi Hadid appears in the music video

Directed by Bouha Kazmi, the accompanying music video for "Pillowtalk" premiered on YouTube on 29 January 2016. Gigi Hadid and Zayn appear in the clip, which features retro graphics, kaleidoscopic and shattered-mirror effects. The music video finds Zayn navigating a sexual fantasia, with a flower covering a mysterious woman's genitals and female silhouettes ogling each other, the former played by actress Jodie Turner-Smith. Hadid appears swirling around the singer, hypnotises him and eventually provokes technicolour tears. They navigate a kaleidoscopic dreamscape, where they make out, make up and cry black tears as Zayn sings.

=== Reception ===
Forbes's contributor Hugh McIntyre praised the visuals, writing "The dripping, trippy visuals match the rock and roll energy of the song perfectly, with the viewer spending as much time with guitars being smashed as they do with Zayn crying black tears." For Lily Harrison from E! Online the video "it's not only extremely seductive, but it's very artistic," while Erica Gonzales from Harper's Bazaar wrote "the visuals are dark yet psychedelic." Lucas Villa of AXS commented "The debut clip seems to reflect the singer's artsy side. The action here is not as steamy between the two as the song suggests but it's still a NSFW video." Time's Nolan Feeney thought "Zayn seems determined to break with his boy-band image." The music video topped the UK TV Airplay Chart, and reached number two on the Israel TV airplay chart. Online, the video received more than 25 million views in three days, and 247 million views after one month.

== Track listing ==
Digital download
No.	Title	Length
1.	"PILLOWTALK"	3:23

Digital download (Clean version)
No.	Title	Length
1.	"PILLOWTALK"	3:23

Digital download
No.	Title	Length
1.	"PILLOWTALK (the living room session)"	2:25

Digital download
No.	Title	Length
1.	"PILLOWTALK REMIX" (featuring Lil Wayne)	3:41

CD single
No.	Title	Length
1.	"PILLOWTALK"	3:23

== Charts ==
=== Weekly charts ===
Chart (2016)	Peak position
Australia (ARIA)	1
Austria (Ö3 Austria Top 40)	3
Belgium (Ultratop 50 Flanders)	18
Belgium (Ultratop 50 Wallonia)	19
Canada Hot 100 (Billboard)	1
Canada AC (Billboard)	12
Canada CHR/Top 40 (Billboard)	1
Canada Hot AC (Billboard)	3
Czech Republic Singles Digital (ČNS IFPI)	2
Czech Republic Airplay (ČNS IFPI)	20
Denmark (Tracklisten)	5
Europe (Euro Digital Songs)	3
Finland (Suomen virallinen lista)	6
France (SNEP)	4
Germany (GfK)	5
Greece Digital Songs (Billboard)	1
Hungary (Single Top 40)	4
Hungary (Stream Top 40)	1
Ireland (IRMA)	1
Israel International Airplay (Media Forest)	8
Italy (FIMI)	3
Japan Hot 100 (Billboard)	55
Japan Hot Overseas (Billboard)	1
Lebanon (OLT 20)	3
Luxembourg Digital Songs (Billboard)	7
Mexico (Billboard Mexican Airplay)	2
Mexico Streaming (AMPROFON)	4
Mexico Anglo (Monitor Latino)	5
Netherlands (Dutch Top 40)	10
Netherlands (Single Top 100)	9
New Zealand (Recorded Music NZ)	1
Norway (VG-lista)	2
Poland Airplay (ZPAV)	21
Portugal (AFP)	1
Scottish Singles Sales (Official Charts)	1
Serbia (Radiomonitor)	10
Slovakia Singles Digital (ČNS IFPI)	1
Slovakia Airplay (ČNS IFPI)	27
South Africa Airplay (EMA)	3
South Korea (Gaon)	60
Spain (Promusicae)	12
Sweden (Sverigetopplistan)	1
Switzerland (Schweizer Hitparade)	15
UK Singles (Official Charts)	1
UK Hip Hop/R&B (Official Charts)	1
US Billboard Hot 100	1
US Adult Contemporary (Billboard)	21
US Adult Pop Airplay (Billboard)	13
US Dance Airplay (Billboard)	9
US Latin Pop Airplay (Billboard)	30
US Pop Airplay (Billboard)	1
US Rhythmic Airplay (Billboard)	7

=== Year-end charts ===
Chart (2016)	Position
Australia (ARIA)	32
Belgium (Ultratop Flanders)	86
Brazil (Brasil Hot 100)	84
Canada (Canadian Hot 100)	20
Denmark (Tracklisten)	43
France (SNEP)	104
Germany (Official German Charts)	88
Italy (FIMI)	51
Netherlands (Dutch Top 40)	31
Netherlands (Single Top 100)	37
New Zealand (Recorded Music NZ)	19
Spain (PROMUSICAE)	67
Sweden (Sverigetopplistan)	30
Switzerland (Schweizer Hitparade)	68
UK Singles (Official Charts Company)	24
US Billboard Hot 100	22
US Adult Top 40 (Billboard)	41
US Dance/Mix Show Airplay (Billboard)	49
US Mainstream Top 40 (Billboard)	12
US Rhythmic (Billboard)	43

== Certifications ==
Region	Certification	Certified units/sales
Australia (ARIA)	4× Platinum	280,000^{‡}
Belgium (BRMA)	Gold	10,000^{‡}
Brazil (Pro-Música Brasil)	2× Diamond	500,000^{‡}
Canada (Music Canada)	4× Platinum	320,000^{‡}
Denmark (IFPI Danmark)	2× Platinum	180,000^{‡}
France (SNEP)	Platinum	133,333^{‡}
Germany (BVMI)	Platinum	400,000^{‡}
Italy (FIMI)	2× Platinum	100,000^{‡}
Mexico (AMPROFON)	Diamond+2× Platinum+Gold	450,000^{‡}
New Zealand (RMNZ)	5× Platinum	150,000^{‡}
Poland (ZPAV)	Diamond	100,000^{‡}
Portugal (AFP)	Platinum	10,000^{‡}
Spain (Promusicae)	Platinum	40,000^{‡}
Sweden (GLF)	3× Platinum	120,000^{‡}
Switzerland (IFPI Switzerland)	Platinum	30,000^{‡}
United Kingdom (BPI)	3× Platinum	1,800,000^{‡}
United States (RIAA)	5× Platinum	5,000,000^{‡}
^{‡} Sales+streaming figures based on certification alone.

== Release history ==
Country	Date	Format	Label	Ref.
Australia	29 January 2016	Digital download	RCA	
Canada	29 January 2016	Digital download	RCA	
France	29 January 2016	Digital download	RCA	
Italy	29 January 2016	Digital download	RCA	
Spain	29 January 2016	Digital download	RCA	
United Kingdom	29 January 2016	Digital download	RCA	
United States	29 January 2016	Digital download	RCA	
Italy	29 January 2016	Contemporary hit radio	RCA	
United States	2 February 2016	Contemporary hit radio	RCA	
United States	3 February 2016	Digital download (the living room session) [acoustic]	RCA	
United States	25 February 2016	Digital download (remix)	RCA	

== Cover versions and usage in media ==
Cover versions of "Pillowtalk" have been uploaded to YouTube by SoMo, Niki and Gabi, Conor Maynard, Tanner Patrick, The Vamps, Alex Aiono, Julio D, and Boyce Avenue. JoJo performed a live rendition at concerts in Cologne and London. Låpsley performed a cover version on BBC Radio 1's Live Lounge. Shaun Reynolds and Kaycee da Silva uploaded a cover version of "Pillowtalk" on YouTube. The Gregory Brothers uploaded a tongue-in-cheek, uptempo cover to YouTube as part of their "Happy Sad Songs" series. It is re-envisioned as an alternative electro rock song, partially inspired by The Strokes. Stwo released a remix of "Pillowtalk" on SoundCloud. In season 10 of The Voice, contestant Bryan Bautista performed a rendition of "Pillowtalk". American rapper Tyler, The Creator released a remix of "Pillowtalk" in June 2016. It was danced by Terrell Owens and his partner on Dancing with the Stars (American season 25)
