= SoMo discography =

- Studio albums: 5
- Singles: 39
- Mixtapes: 3
- Promotional singles: 5

American singer-songwriter SoMo has released five studio albums, three mixtapes, and thirty-nine singles. His debut album, SoMo, was released on April 8, 2014, debuting at number six on the Billboard 200 and at number two on the Top R&B/Hip-Hop Albums charts. The album's lead single, Ride, was released December 7, 2013 and peaked at number seventy-six on the Billboard Hot 100 chart and number eleven on the US Hot R&B/Hip-Hop Songs.

== Studio albums ==
List of studio albums, with selected chart positions
Title	Details	Peak chart positions		
Title	Details	US	US R&B	US Heatseekers
SoMo	Released: April 8, 2014; Label: Republic; Formats: CD, digital download	6	2	—
The Answers	Released: March 17, 2017; Label: Republic; Formats: CD, digital download	178	—	—
A Beautiful November	Released: November 30, 2018; Label: SoMo, LLC; Formats: Digital download, streaming	—	—	—
I Had Another Dream	Released: October 19, 2020; Label: SoMo, LLC; Formats: Digital download, streaming	—	—	—
The Duality of Man	Released: June 14, 2021; Label: SoMo, LLC; Formats: Digital download, streaming	—	—	—
"—" denotes a recording that did not chart or was not released in that territory.

== Mixtapes ==
List of mixtapes, with selected chart positions
Title	Details	Peak chart positions		
Title	Details	US	US R&B	US Heatseekers
My Life	Released: November 19, 2013; Label: Republic; Format: Digital download	—	—	24
My Life II	Released: September 11, 2015; Label: Republic; Format: Digital download	50	9	—
My Life III	Released: September 11, 2017; Label: SoMo, LLC; Format: Digital download	—	—	—
"—" denotes a recording that did not chart or was not released in that territory.

== Singles ==
List of singles, with selected chart positions and certifications, showing year released and album name
Title	Year	Peak chart positions		Certifications	Album
Title	Year	US	US R&B	Certifications	Album
"Kings & Queens (Throw It Up)"	2013	—	—		My Life
"Oh, Hell"	2013				My Life
"Ride"	2013	76	11	RIAA: 2× Platinum	SoMo
"Show Off"	2014	—	—		SoMo
"Hush"	2014	—	—		SoMo
"Back To The Start"	2014	—	—		SoMo
"We Can Make Love"	2014	—	—		SoMo
"Bad Chick"	2015	—	—		My Life II
"Hide & Freak" (featuring Trey Songz)	2015	—	—		My Life II
"Make Up Sex"	2015	—	—		My Life II
"You Can Buy Everything"	2016	—	—		My Life II
"Control"	2016	—	—		The Answers
"First"	2016	—	—		The Answers
"Play" (featuring Maty Noyes)	2017	—	—		The Answers
"For You"	2017	—	—		My Life III
"50 Feet"	2017	—	—		A Beautiful November
"Wake Up Call"	2018	—	—		Non-album single
"Nov 12"	2018	—	—		A Beautiful November
"I'm Comin' Home"	2018	—	—		A Beautiful November
"Better Me"	2018	—	—		A Beautiful November
"All the Time"	2018	—	—		A Beautiful November
"Weight"	2018	—	—		A Beautiful November
"Roses"	2018	—	—		A Beautiful November
"I Wish"	2018	—	—		A Beautiful November
"Wild Heart"		—	—		I Had Another Dream
"Neck"		—	—		I Had Another Dream
"Visualize"		—	—		I Had Another Dream
"Maybe"		—	—		Non-album single
"Sinkin' Down"	2020	—	—		I Had Another Dream
"Mi Amor"	2020	—	—		I Had Another Dream
"Dime"	2020	—	—		I Had Another Dream
"Brian K. Lundy, Jr."	2020	—	—		Non-album single
"All That"	2020	—	—		I Had Another Dream
"Trees"	2020	—	—		The Duality of Man
"Blue Rose"	2021	—	—		The Duality of Man
"Boom"	2021	—	—		The Duality of Man
"Dolly Parton"	2021	—	—		The Duality of Man
"Rain"	2021	—	—		The Duality of Man
"Daughters"	2021	—	—		The Duality of Man
"—" denotes a recording that did not chart or was not released in that territory.

=== Promotional singles ===
Title	Year	Album
"Just a Man"	2017	The Answers
"Champion"	2017	The Answers
"Want It"	2017	The Answers
"For You"	2017	My Life III
"Friends"	2017	My Life III
