= Billboard Year-End Hot 100 singles of 2009 =

Ranking of recorded music

Billboard magazine each year releases a Top Hot 100 songs of the year, counted from the first week of November to the final week in October. For 2009, the chart was published on December 11. The 2009 list was dominated by The Black Eyed Peas and Lady Gaga, who shared the top four spots. In late December, DJ Earworm released a mashup video to YouTube titled "Blame It On the Pop", featuring the top twenty-five songs from the list, as he had also done the previous two years for his "United State of Pop" series. The video quickly received four million views in little over a week.

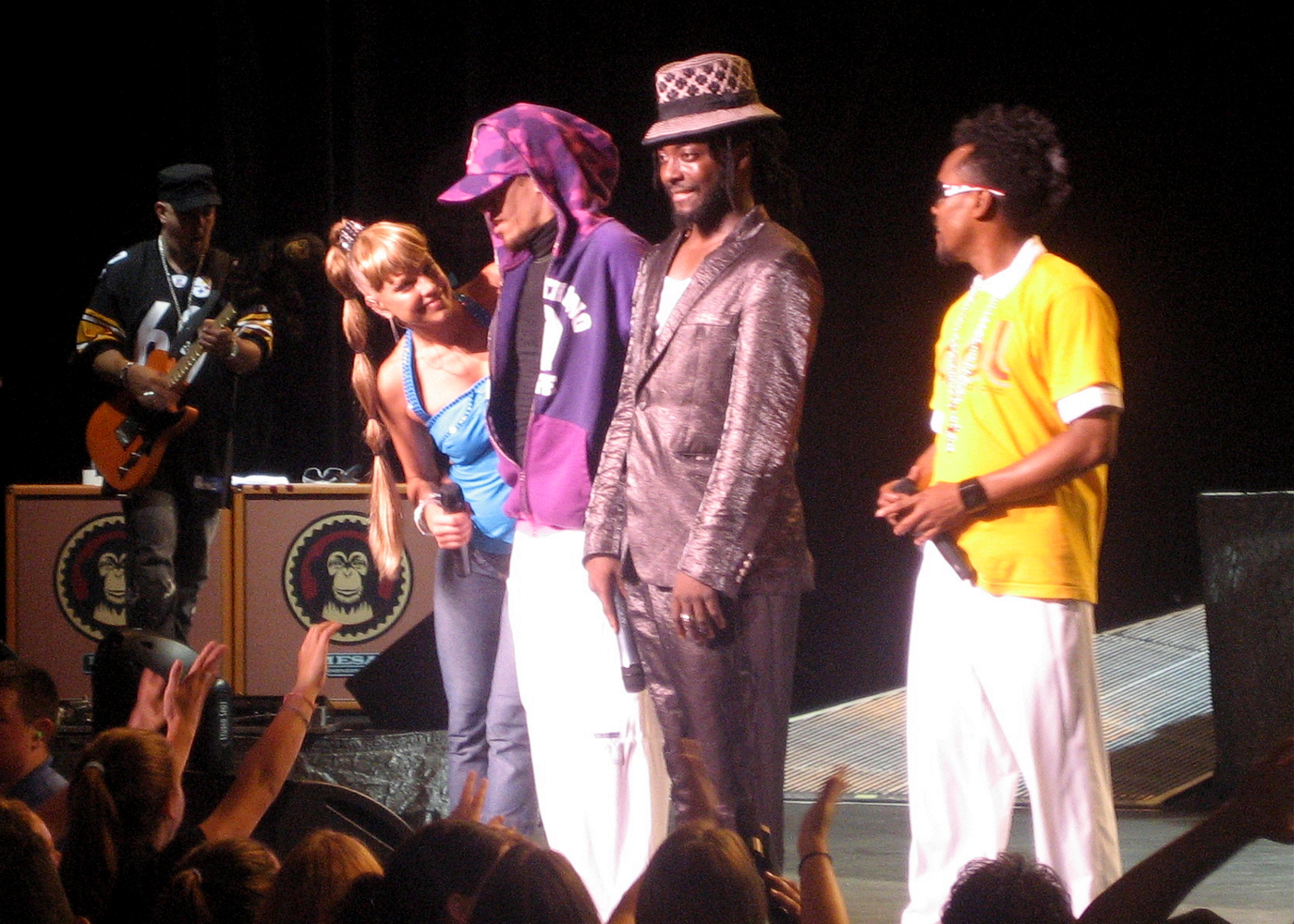
The Black Eyed Peas had the best-performing single of the year with "Boom Boom Pow." They also had "I Gotta Feeling" on the chart at number 4.

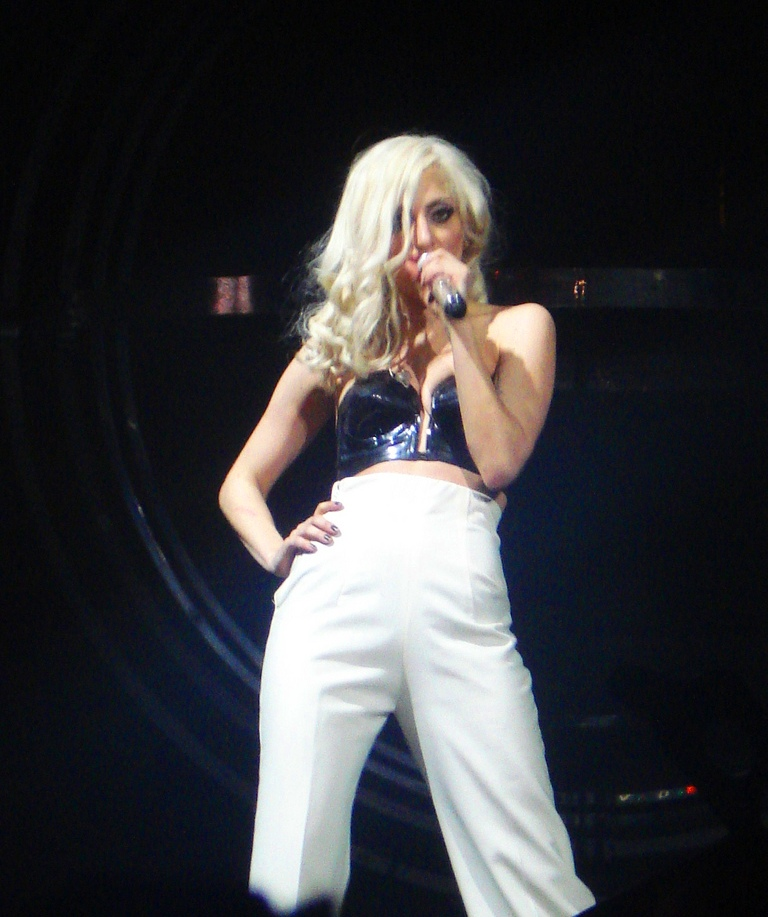
Pop singer Lady Gaga had four songs on the chart. "Paparazzi," "LoveGame," "Just Dance," and "Poker Face" at 53, 35, 3, and 2 respectively.

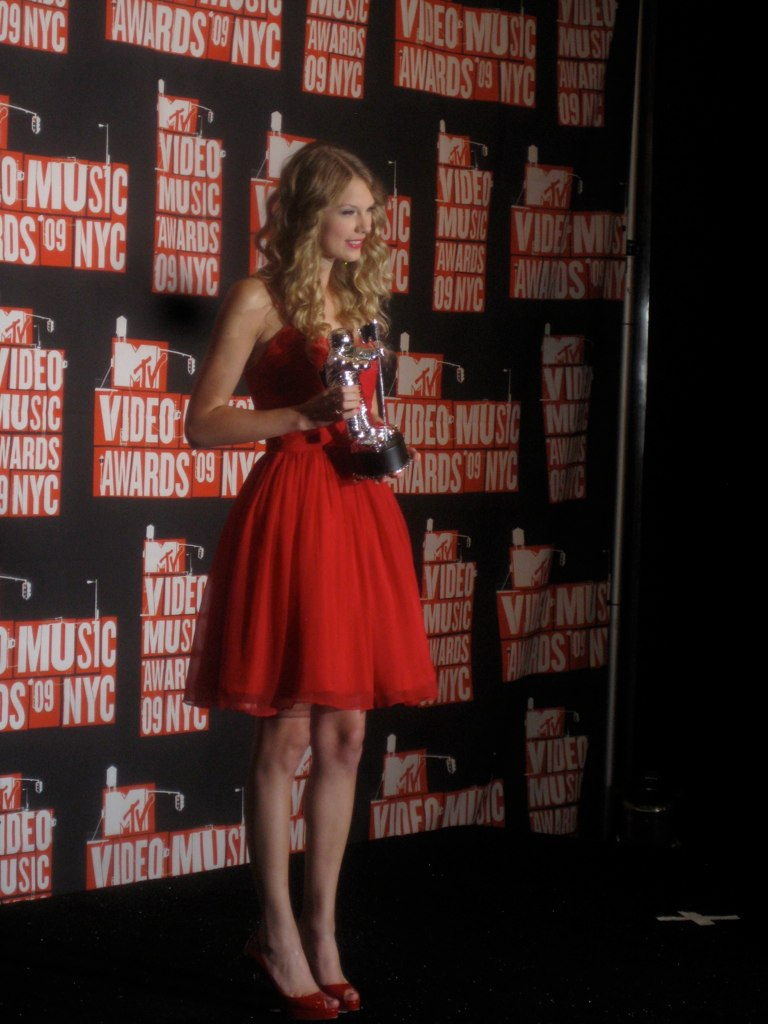
Taylor Swift was the most successful country artist, with three singles on the chart: "Love Story" at 5, "You Belong With Me" at 11, and "White Horse" at 76.

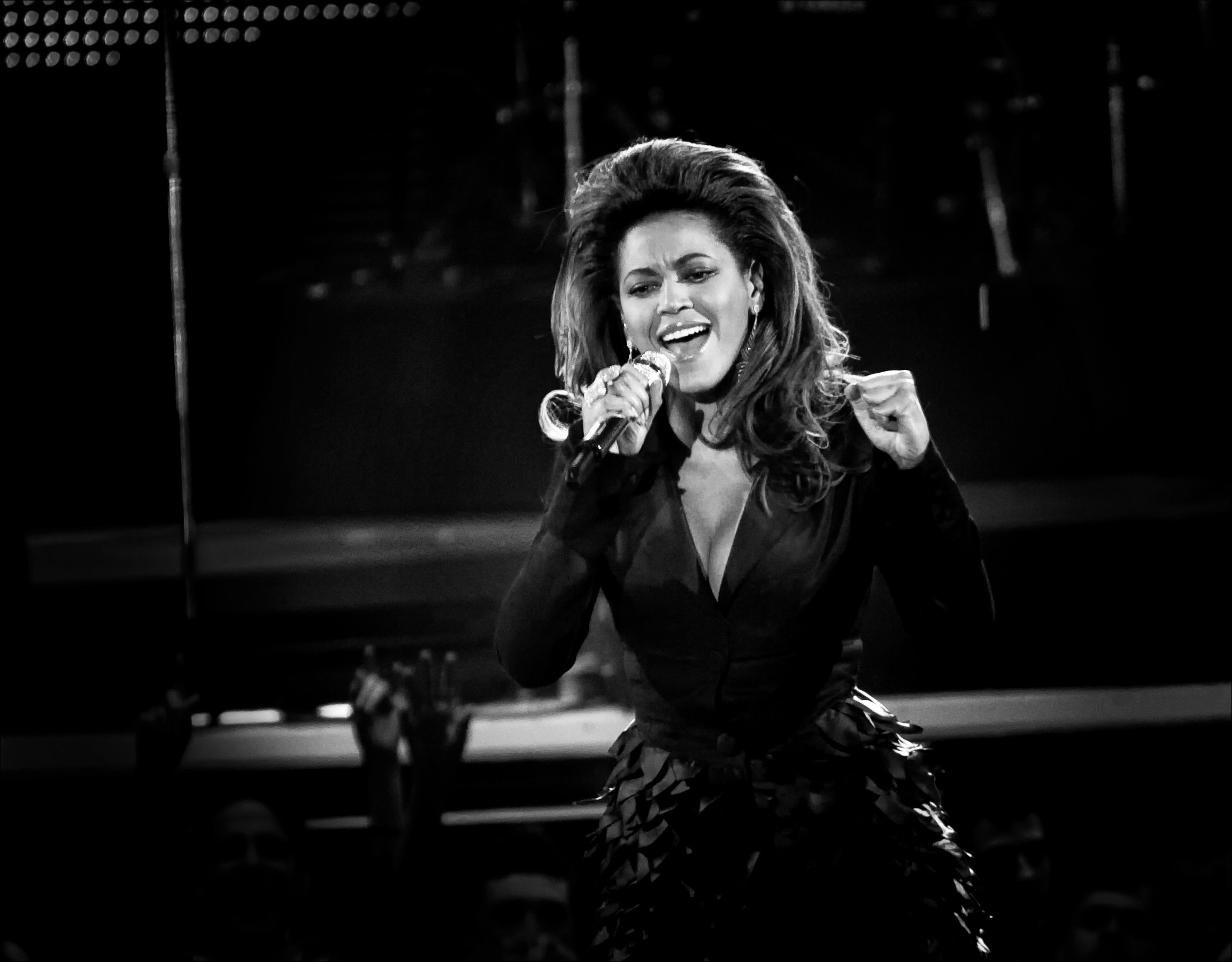
Beyoncé had five songs on the chart, all of which were from her album I Am... Sasha Fierce.

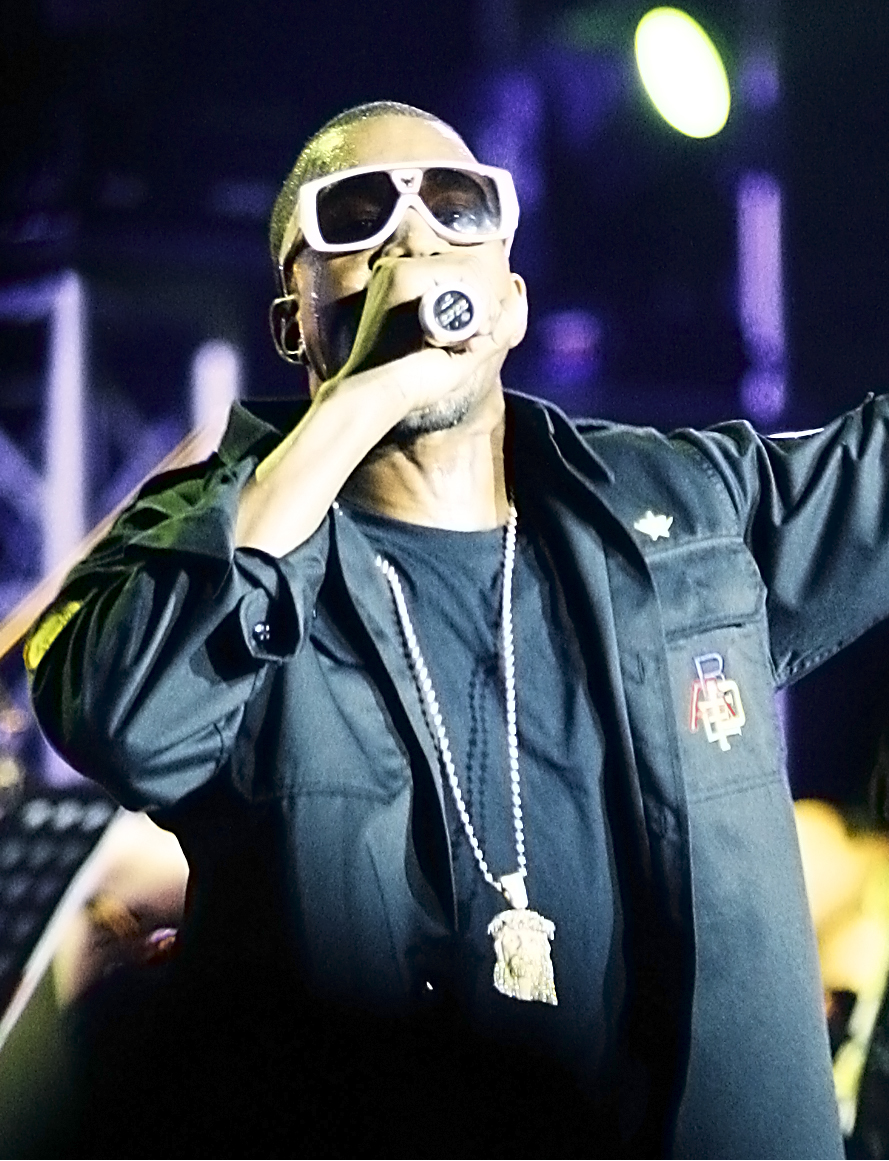
Kanye West was the most successful male artist with five songs on the chart. His most successful single was "Heartless" at number 9.

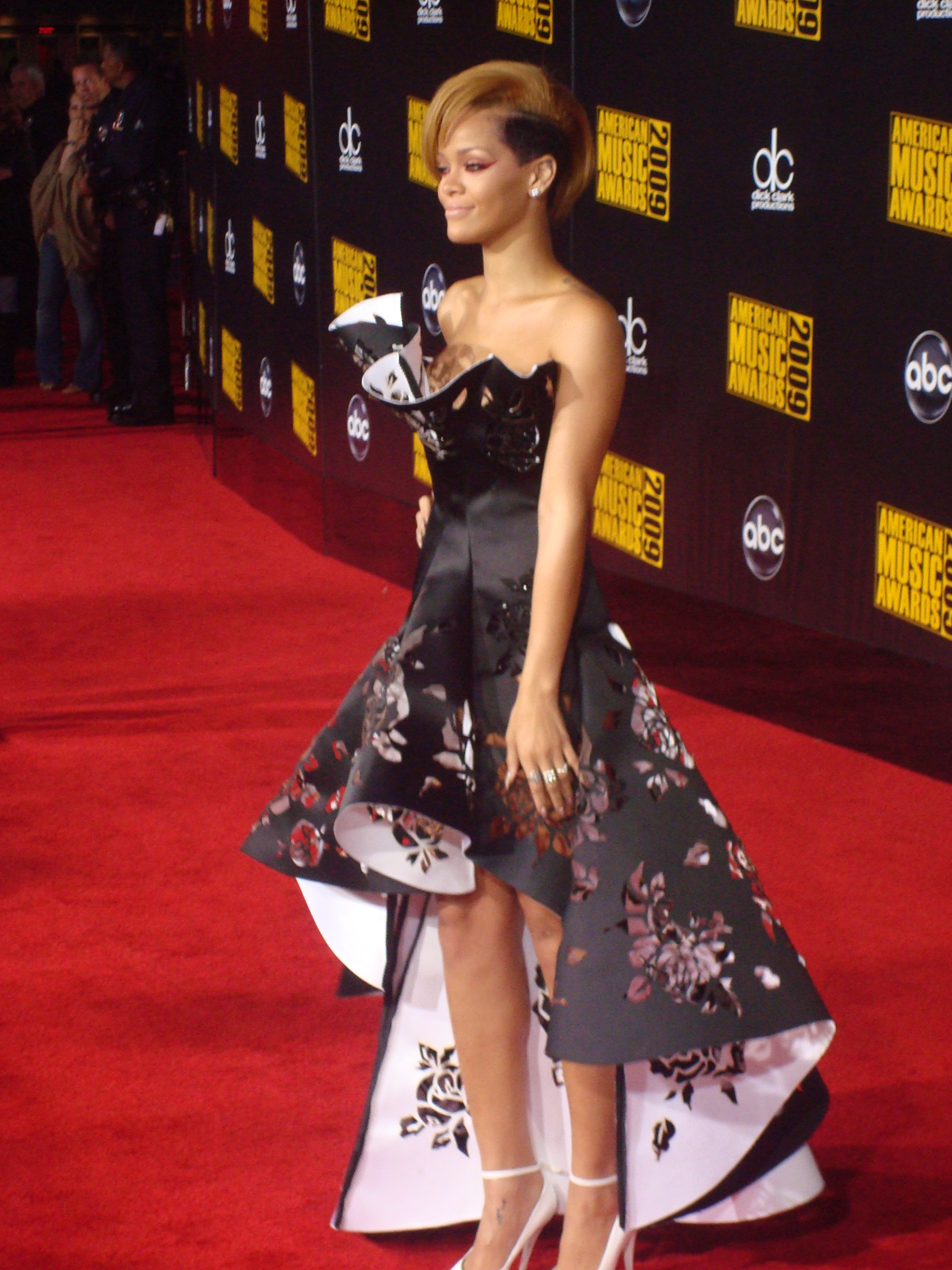
Rihanna had three singles on the chart: Disturbia at 77, Run This Town at 31, and Live Your Life at 18.

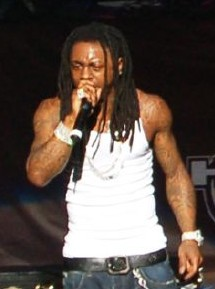
Lil Wayne was another successful male artist with five songs on the chart. His most successful singles include "Down" with Jay Sean at number 20, "Let It Rock" with Kevin Rudolf at 32, "Turnin Me On" with Keri Hilson at 49, "Every Girl" with Young Money at 67, and "Forever" with Drake, Kanye West, and Eminem at 88.

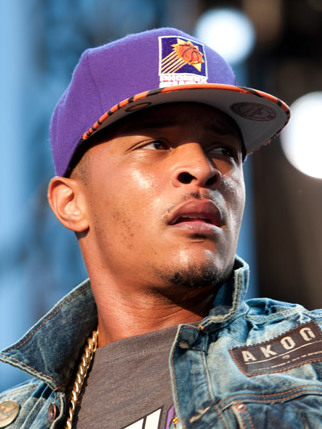
T.I. had three songs on the chart. His most successful singles include "Dead and Gone" with Justin Timberlake at number 12, "Live Your Life" with Rihanna at 18, and "Whatever You Like" at 40.

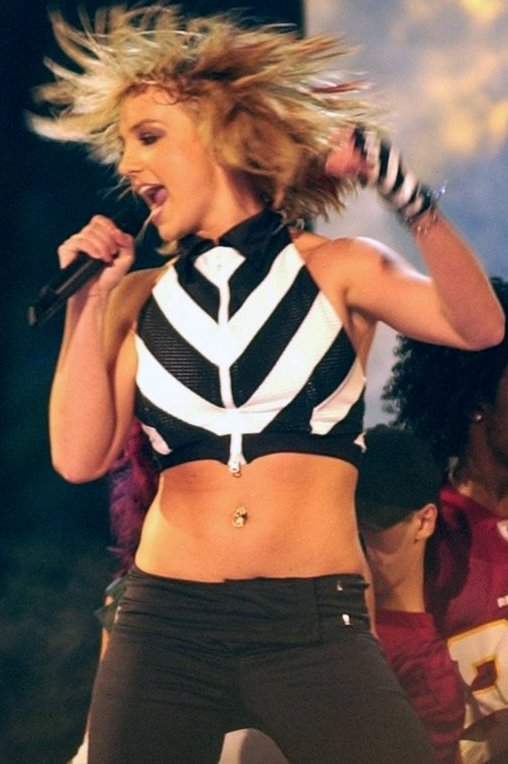
Britney Spears had four songs on the chart. Three singles from her album Circus: "Circus" at 27, "Womanizer" at 39, "If U Seek Amy" at 74, and "3" at 87 from her album The Singles Collection.

No.	Title	Artist(s)
1	"Boom Boom Pow"	The Black Eyed Peas
2	"Poker Face"	Lady Gaga
3	"Just Dance"	Lady Gaga featuring Colby O'Donis
4	"I Gotta Feeling"	The Black Eyed Peas
5	"Love Story"	Taylor Swift
6	"Right Round"	Flo Rida
7	"I'm Yours"	Jason Mraz
8	"Single Ladies (Put a Ring on It)"	Beyoncé
9	"Heartless"	Kanye West
10	"Gives You Hell"	The All-American Rejects
11	"You Belong with Me"	Taylor Swift
12	"Dead and Gone"	T.I. featuring Justin Timberlake
13	"You Found Me"	The Fray
14	"Use Somebody"	Kings of Leon
15	"Knock You Down"	Keri Hilson featuring Kanye West and Ne-Yo
16	"Blame It"	Jamie Foxx featuring T-Pain
17	"I Know You Want Me (Calle Ocho)"	Pitbull
18	"Live Your Life"	T.I. featuring Rihanna
19	"Kiss Me thru the Phone"	Soulja Boy Tell 'Em featuring Sammie
20	"Down"	Jay Sean featuring Lil Wayne
21	"The Climb"	Miley Cyrus
22	"Best I Ever Had"	Drake
23	"My Life Would Suck Without You"	Kelly Clarkson
24	"Halo"	Beyoncé
25	"Hot n Cold"	Katy Perry
26	"Second Chance"	Shinedown
27	"Circus"	Britney Spears
28	"Day 'n' Nite"	Kid Cudi
29	"Party in the U.S.A."	Miley Cyrus
30	"Don't Trust Me"	3OH!3
31	"Run This Town"	Jay-Z featuring Rihanna and Kanye West
32	"Let It Rock"	Kevin Rudolf featuring Lil Wayne
33	"Fire Burning"	Sean Kingston
34	"Whatcha Say"	Jason Derulo
35	"LoveGame"	Lady Gaga
36	"Waking Up in Vegas"	Katy Perry
37	"Birthday Sex"	Jeremih
38	"Sober"	Pink
39	"Womanizer"	Britney Spears
40	"Whatever You Like"	T.I.
41	"Obsessed"	Mariah Carey
42	"Mad"	Ne-Yo
43	"Good Girls Go Bad"	Cobra Starship featuring Leighton Meester
44	"Love Lockdown"	Kanye West
45	"So What"	Pink
46	"Hotel Room Service"	Pitbull
47	"Crack a Bottle"	Eminem, Dr. Dre and 50 Cent
48	"If I Were a Boy"	Beyoncé
49	"Turnin Me On"	Keri Hilson featuring Lil Wayne
50	"I Hate This Part"	Pussycat Dolls
51	"Gotta Be Somebody"	Nickelback
52	"Please Don't Leave Me"	Pink
53	"Paparazzi"	Lady Gaga
54	"Beautiful"	Akon featuring Colby O'Donis and Kardinal Offishall
55	"Viva la Vida"	Coldplay
56	"Right Now (Na Na Na)"	Akon
57	"Battlefield"	Jordin Sparks
58	"Sugar"	Flo Rida featuring Wynter
59	"Miss Independent"	Ne-Yo
60	"Fireflies"	Owl City
61	"New Divide"	Linkin Park
62	"Empire State of Mind"	Jay-Z featuring Alicia Keys
63	"No Surprise"	Daughtry
64	"She Wolf"	Shakira
65	"Break Up"	Mario featuring Gucci Mane and Sean Garrett
66	"Sweet Dreams"	Beyoncé
67	"Every Girl"	Young Money
68	"Fallin' for You"	Colbie Caillat
69	"Untouched"	The Veronicas
70	"If Today Was Your Last Day"	Nickelback
71	"Throw It in the Bag"	Fabolous featuring The-Dream
72	"Love Drunk"	Boys Like Girls
73	"I Love College"	Asher Roth
74	"If U Seek Amy"	Britney Spears
75	"Big Green Tractor"	Jason Aldean
76	"White Horse"	Taylor Swift
77	"Disturbia"	Rihanna
78	"21 Guns"	Green Day
79	"Turn My Swag On"	Soulja Boy Tell 'Em
80	"Rockin' That Thang"	The-Dream
81	"Chicken Fried"	Zac Brown Band
82	"Diva"	Beyoncé
83	"Replay"	Iyaz
84	"Then"	Brad Paisley
85	"Her Diamonds"	Rob Thomas
86	"How Do You Sleep?"	Jesse McCartney featuring Ludacris
87	"3"	Britney Spears
88	"Forever"	Drake featuring Kanye West, Lil Wayne and Eminem
89	"One Time"	Justin Bieber
90	"I Run to You"	Lady Antebellum
91	"I Do Not Hook Up"	Kelly Clarkson
92	"Green Light"	John Legend featuring André 3000
93	"People Are Crazy"	Billy Currington
94	"Whatever It Is"	Zac Brown Band
95	"Already Gone"	Kelly Clarkson
96	"Goodbye"	Kristinia DeBarge
97	"Say Hey (I Love You)"	Michael Franti & Spearhead featuring Cherine Anderson
98	"Pop Champagne"	Jim Jones featuring Ron Browz and Juelz Santana
99	"Pretty Wings"	Maxwell
100	"Never Say Never"	The Fray

== See also ==
- 2009 in music
- Billboard Year-End Hot R&B/Hip-Hop Songs of 2009
- Billboard Year-End Hot Rap Songs of 2009
- List of Billboard Hot 100 number-one singles of 2009
- List of Billboard Hot 100 top-ten singles in 2009
