= Erik White =

American music video director

Erik White is an American music video director. In 2010, he made his feature film directorial debut with the comedy film Lottery Ticket, starring rappers Bow Wow and Ice Cube. He appeared on the reality show competition The Glee Project on the Oxygen network. White got his start doing music videos after visiting a video set of his uncle Hype Williams.

== Videography ==
This is a list of music videos featuring directing credits attributed to White. His most frequent collaborator is singer Chris Brown with seven videos.

For several years, he directed most of the videos for numerous artists:

=== 2002 ===
- "Uh Huh" by B2K
- "Single For The Rest of My Life" by Isyss
- "Neva Get Enuf" by 3LW featuring Lil' Wayne

=== 2003 ===
- "C'Mon" by Mario
- "Can't Let You Go/Damn" by Fabolous featuring Mike Shorey and Lil' Mo
- "Gigolo" by Nick Cannon featuring R. Kelly
- "Pump It Up/Focus" by Joe Budden

=== 2004 ===
- "Leave (Get Out)" by JoJo
- "Baby It's You" by JoJo
- "Let's Go" by Trick Daddy featuring Twista and Lil Jon
- "One Call Away" by Chingy featuring J-Weav
- "Overnight Celebrity" by Twista featuring Kanye West

=== 2005 ===
- "Run It!" by Chris Brown featuring Juelz Santana
- "Slow Down" by Bobby Valentino
- "U Got Me" by B5
- "Yo (Excuse Me Miss)" by Chris Brown (co-directed with Brown)
- "Shut Up!" by Simple Plan

=== 2006 ===
- "Gimme That Remix" by Chris Brown featuring Lil Wayne (co-directed with Brown)
- "Say Goodbye" by Chris Brown
- "Long Way 2 Go" by Cassie
- "Pullin' Me Back" by Chingy featuring Tyrese
- "Tell Me" by Diddy featuring Christina Aguilera
- "Unappreciated" by Cherish
- "We Ride (I See the Future)" by Mary J. Blige

=== 2007 ===
- "Bartender" by T-Pain featuring Akon
- "Kiss Kiss" by Chris Brown featuring T-Pain (co-directed with Brown)
- "Make Me Better" by Fabolous featuring Ne-Yo
- "Ridin' by Mýa
- "Wall to Wall" by Chris Brown (co-directed with Brown)
- "With You" by Chris Brown (co-directed with Brown)
- "Shoulda Let You Go" by Keyshia Cole

=== 2008 ===
- "Don't Turn Back" by Colby O'Donis
- "Bad Girl" by Danity Kane featuring Missy Elliott
- "Superhuman" by Chris Brown featuring Keri Hilson
- "Turnin Me On" by Keri Hilson featuring Lil Wayne
- "Head of My Class" by Scooter Smiff featuring Chris Brown
- "Since You've Been Gone" by Day26

=== 2009 ===
- "All the Above" by Maino featuring T-Pain
- "Everything, Everyday, Everywhere" by Fabolous featuring Keri Hilson and Ryan Leslie
- "Hell of a Life" by T.I.
- "My Time" by Fabolous featuring Jeremih
- "Raining Sunshine" by Miranda Cosgrove
- "Teach Me How To Jerk" by Audio Push
- "Throw It in the Bag" by Fabolous featuring The-Dream
- "Safe and Sound" by Kyosuke Himuro featuring Gerard Way
- "Under" by Pleasure P
- "Wetter" by Twista featuring Erika Shevon
- "Pronto" by Snoop Dogg featuring Soulja Boy

=== 2010 ===
- "Shut 'Em Up" by J. Lewis

=== 2011 ===
- "Good Girl" by Alexis Jordan
- "Best Love Song" by T-Pain featuring Chris Brown
- "Booty Wurk (One Cheek At a Time) by T-Pain featuring Joey Galaxy
- "Firework (song)" by The Glee Project contenders
- "We're Not Gonna Take It (Twisted Sister song)" by The Glee Project contenders
- "Mad World" by The Glee Project contenders
- "U Can't Touch This" by The Glee Project contenders
- "The Lady Is A Tramp" by The Glee Project contenders
- "Nowadays" by The Glee Project contenders
- "Don't You Want Me" by The Glee Project contenders
- "Baby, It's Cold Outside" by The Glee Project contenders
- "Ice Ice Baby/Under Pressure" by The Glee Project contenders
- "Teenage Dream (Katy Perry song)" by The Glee Project contenders
- "The Only Exception" by The Glee Project contenders
- "Sing (My Chemical Romance song)" by The Glee Project contenders
- "Raise Your Glass" by The Glee Project contenders

=== 2012 ===
- "Wild Ones" by Flo Rida featuring Sia.
- "Here I Go Again" by The Glee Project's season 2 contenders
- "Party Rock Anthem" by The Glee Project's season 2 contenders
- "Everybody Hurts" by The Glee Project's season 2 contenders
- "Moves Like Jagger / Milkshake (song)" by The Glee Project's season 2 contenders
- "Price Tag" by The Glee Project's season 2 contenders
- "Hit Me With Your Best Shot / One Way Or Another" by The Glee Project's season 2 contenders
- "When I Grow Up" by The Glee Project's season 2 contenders
- "Eye of the Tiger" by The Glee Project's season 2 contenders
- "We Found Love" by The Glee Project's season 2 contenders
- "Perfect" by The Glee Project's season 2 contenders
- "In & Out" by Marcus Canty featuring Wale
- "I Love Girls" by Pleasure P
- "Neva End Remix" by Future featuring Kelly Rowland
- "Tears of Joy" by Faith Evans

=== 2013 ===
- "Used by You" by Marcus Canty
- "Keep Her on the Low" by Mindless Behavior
- "Coast to Coast" by Daft Punk
- "I.O.U." by Luke James
- "Made in America" by Cimorelli
- "All the Way Home" by Tamar Braxton
- "She Can Have You" by Tamar Braxton

=== 2014 ===
- "Feels Like Love" by La Toya Jackson

=== 2016 ===
- "Body" by Dreezy ft Jeremih

=== 2021 ===
- "Friends and Family" by The Isley Brothers

=== 2023 ===
- "Ghost" by Autumn Marini
