= Down on Me (Jeremih song) =

Single by Jeremih featuring 50 Cent

from the album All About You
- Released: September 28, 2010
- Recorded: 2010
- Genre: Electro-R&B, hip-hop
- Length: 3:48
- Label: Def Jam
- Songwriters: Jeremy Felton; Curtis Jackson
- Producers: Jeremih; Mick Schultz; Keith James

Jeremih singles chronology
"I Like" (2010)	"Down on Me" (2010)	"I Don't Deserve You" (2011)

50 Cent singles chronology
"Pass the Patron" (2010)	"Down on Me" (2010)	"No Dejemos Que se Apague" (2010)

"Down on Me" is a song by American singer Jeremih, released by Def Jam Recordings on September 28, 2010 as the second single from his second album, All About You (2010). It features a guest appearance from American rapper 50 Cent (becoming their first of many collaborations), with production from longtime Jeremih collaborators Mick Schultz and Keith James. Musically, the track is an electro-R&B club song.

"Down on Me" peaked at number four on the Billboard Hot 100, matching Jeremih's 2009 single, "Birthday Sex", in chart position. It also received sextuple platinum certification by the Recording Industry Association of America (RIAA).

== Background ==
When asked about the collaboration, 50 Cent, in an interview with Angie Martinez, said: "I was just looking at him as an artist and I said he sounds good, and I thought he was a dope artist, so I said I'mma do it and we did the song, and then it took off. It made sense to me from an artist's perspective," he continued. "What I have now, the luxury of being in a secure space financially, is me having the ability to make decisions based on just the art."

== Music video ==
The official music video was shot in Los Angeles by director Colin Tilley on November 23, 2010, and was released on December 15, 2010. A 3D music video was released on 50 Cent's blog. The video begins in a club where a woman is dancing with an umbrella while dancing in front of the speakers. Meanwhile, Jeremih is seen on a chair while a woman is dancing beside him and also another woman is seen dancing while jamming her guitar. During the rap verse, 50 Cent is seen rapping his verse through a hole in the wall which is revealed to be a bar. Then, Jeremih and 50 Cent are seen separated in a rectangular wall while Jeremih sings the song. At the end of the video, Jeremih and 50 Cent stare at the camera while the video fades.

The music video on YouTube has received over 405 million views as of December 2024.

== Chart performance ==
In the United Kingdom, the song debuted on the UK Singles Chart at number eighty-seven. After dropping out of the top 100 the following week, it re-entered the chart and has climbed up in chart for 16 weeks to reach a current peak of 30, marking his second top 40 hit in the UK. As of May 2024, the song has sold 600,000 copies in the UK.

The song debuted on the Billboard Hot 100 at number sixty-seven and peaked at number four in its twenty-third week. On the week of February 28, 2011, the song reached number one on the Billboard Rhythmic chart and stayed there for 6 weeks. As of April 2011, the song 2,042,000 digital downloads in the US.

In Romania, Down on Me became a number one success, as it entered the top ten of the Romanian Top 100 at number five on July 17, 2011, and climbed up to the top of the chart on the following week.

== Charts ==
=== Weekly charts ===
Chart (2010–2011)	Peak position
Australia (ARIA)	91
Australia (ARIA Urban Singles)	32
Belgium (Ultratip Bubbling Under Flanders)	14
Belgium (Ultratop 50 Wallonia)	42
Canada Hot 100 (Billboard)	22
Denmark (Tracklisten)	25
France (SNEP)	19
Romanian Top 100	1
Sweden (Sverigetopplistan)	37
Switzerland (Schweizer Hitparade)	75
UK Hip Hop/R&B (Official Charts)	9
UK Singles (Official Charts)	30
US Billboard Hot 100	4
US Hot R&B/Hip-Hop Songs (Billboard)	7
US Pop Airplay (Billboard)	8
US Rhythmic Airplay (Billboard)	1

=== Year-end charts ===
Chart (2011)	Position
Romanian Top 100	5
UK Singles (Official Charts Company)	138
US Billboard Hot 100	22
US Hot R&B/Hip-Hop Songs (Billboard)	20
US Mainstream Top 40 (Billboard)	46
US Rhythmic (Billboard)	3

== Certifications ==
Region	Certification	Certified units/sales
Brazil (Pro-Música Brasil)	Platinum	60,000^{‡}
Denmark (IFPI Danmark)	Gold	45,000^{‡}
New Zealand (RMNZ)	2× Platinum	60,000^{‡}
United Kingdom (BPI)	Platinum	600,000^{‡}
United States (RIAA)	6× Platinum	6,000,000^{‡}
^{‡} Sales+streaming figures based on certification alone.

== Release history ==
Country	Date	Format	Label
United States	September 28, 2010	Digital download	Def Jam

== See also ==
- List of Romanian Top 100 number ones of the 2010s
