= Mick Schultz =

American music producer from Missouri

- Born: Michael Abram Schultz; March 30, 1989 (age 37); St. Louis, Missouri, U.S.
- Occupations: Record producer; songwriter
- Years active: 2008–present

Michael Abram Schultz (born March 30, 1989) is an American music producer and songwriter. He is best known for his work with R&B singer Jeremih, having produced for the near-entirety of his discography. Schultz has been credited on his singles "Birthday Sex", "Down on Me", and "Don't Tell 'Em", each of which have peaked within the top ten of the Billboard Hot 100. For other artists, Schultz has also produced the songs "Desperado" for Rihanna and "Replay" for Zendaya, with further credits on albums and singles by Kelly Clarkson, SoMo, Jenna Andrews, and Jessie James Decker, among others.

== Early life ==
Schultz was born in St. Louis, Missouri, United States. He is the only child of Steve Schultz and Lynn Schultz. Schultz, a classically trained pianist, showed musical abilities at a very young age and began deejaying local parties at the age of 10. He went on to produce for local acts in and around St. Louis before completing high school. After graduating from Parkway Central High School in 2007, he enrolled in Columbia College, a performing arts school in Chicago, Illinois. Following a chance meeting with fellow student, and then unknown, Jeremih, he began his career in the music industry.

== Career ==
Schultz and Jeremih wrote and recorded one song together shortly after meeting in 2008. Schultz immediately began walking the music in to local radio, where he met his manager, Luis Duran. Encouraged by positive response, the duo immediately set out to compile what would become Jeremih's debut album.

In late 2008, Schultz went on to launch his own production company, Mick Schultz Productions, to which he immediately signed Jeremih as his first artist. After receiving a tremendous amount of airplay on their song "Birthday Sex", offers started coming in from all the major record labels. Jeremih was promptly signed to Def Jam Records. In 2009, Schultz was signed to a publishing deal with Universal Music Publishing.

In 2010, Schultz and Jeremih teamed up again to produce the artist’s sophomore release, All About You. As with Jeremih's debut album, Schultz was once again the sole producer on the album, which includes such hits as "I Like" featuring Ludacris and "Down on Me" featuring 50 Cent.

Schultz continues to produce and write for various artists. In early 2013, he collaborated with Zendaya to co-produce her debut single "Replay" off her self-titled album. The song reached #40 on the Billboard Hot 100. Schultz also produced an album for Republic Records artist SoMo in mid-2013. They recorded the album in Schultz's Malibu studio. The self-titled album was released on April 8, 2014 through Universal Republic.

In mid-2014, Schultz co-produced the double platinum selling single "Don't Tell 'Em" by Jeremih, featuring YG.

Schultz produced Rihanna's "Desperado" off her 2016 album entitled ANTI. He received a Grammy nomination for his work.

In 2018, Schultz received another Grammy nomination for his work on Kelly Clarkson's album Meaning Of Life, in which he produced songs "Heat" and "Medicine".

In 2023 Mick produced a song on Diddy's The Love Album: Off The Grid entitled "Boo Hoo" which also received a Grammy nomination. He received two more nominations for Burna Boy's single "City Boys" and Burna Boy's album "I Told Them".

== Discography ==
- Jeremih - Jeremih (2009)
- Jeremih - All About You (2010)
- SoMo - SoMo (2014)
- Keith James - Funk Christmas, Pt. 1 (2015)
- Jeremih - Late Nights (2015)
- Rihanna - ANTI (2016)
- SoMo - The Answers (2017)
- Lights - "Giants" (2017)
- Kelly Clarkson - Meaning of Life (2017)
- Max Frost - Gold Rush (2018)
- Why Don't We - 8 Letters (2018)
- Kyle - See You When I Am Famous (2020)
- Blackswan - Goodbye Rania (2020)
- Abir - Heat (2023)
- Kamauu - flings (2023)
- Diddy - The Love Album: Off The Grid (2023)

== Awards ==
- 2015 iHeart Radio Music Awards Best Hip-Hop & R&B Song of the year for "Don't Tell Em" by Jeremih
- 2010 29th Annual Chicago Music Awards Record Producer of the Year
- 2009 Billboard #1 Hot R&B/Hip-Pop AirPlay "Birthday Sex"
- 2009 Billboard #1 Hot R&B/Hip-Pop Songs "Birthday Sex"
