= All About You (album) =

Studio album by Jeremih
- Released: September 28, 2010
- Recorded: 2009–2010
- Genres: Pop; R&B
- Length: 43:21
- Label: Def Jam
- Producer: Mick Schultz

Jeremih chronology
Jeremih (2009)	All About You (2010)	Late Nights (2015)

Singles from All About You
- 1. "I Like" Released: July 6, 2010; 2. "Down on Me" Released: September 28, 2010

All About You is the second studio album by American recording artist Jeremih, released on September 28, 2010 by Def Jam Recordings. The album's production was handled by frequent producer Mick Schultz, and was supported by the two singles: "I Like" featuring Def Jam labelmate Ludacris, and "Down on Me" featuring 50 Cent, the latter of which peaked at number four on the Billboard Hot 100—tying itself with his previous album's lead single "Birthday Sex"—and received sextuple platinum certification by the Recording Industry Association of America (RIAA). Due to the latter distinction, "Down on Me" has yielded Jeremih's furthest commercial success.

Along with a critical decline, All About You was proved to be less commercially successful than his debut album, though in 2023, the album was certified platinum by the RIAA.

== Singles ==
On June 1, 2010, Jeremih released the first single from the album, titled "I Like" featuring Ludacris. The second single from the album, called "Down on Me" featuring 50 Cent. The video for the song was shot in 3D and also features 50 Cent. Later on the third single titled "Love Don't Change" was released.

== Critical reception ==
Professional ratings
Review scores
Source	Rating
AllMusic	2.5/5 stars
Parle Magazine	3/5

All About You was met with a generally mixed reviews from music critics. Andy Kellman of Allmusic gave the album 2.5 stars out of five, saying "Like his self-titled debut, which coasted to the Top Ten of the Billboard 200, Jeremih’s All About You is produced by partner Mick Schultz. Schultz’s beats on Jeremih amalgamated the styles of numerous contemporaries, and there is not much advancement on the follow-up, while the opening “All About You” is pretty close to a direct swipe of the-Dream's “Shawty Is a 10.” Jeremih often sounds drowsy, detached, and slumped in his VIP club booth, instead of on the prowl. Nothing approaches the bounding swagger of the debut’s “Break Up to Make Up,” and “Wanna Get Up,” the most overt dance floor track, lacks the appeal of “Runway” and is ultimately forgettable. Worst of all is “Holding On,” an earnest, vaguely inspirational ballad song not built for Jeremih’s voice, which is best suited for lecherous material. The highlights, unsurprisingly, are the ballads for the bedroom, though some of the lyrics—like “That’s right, we go from six to nine o’clock”—might result in groans of an undesirable sort".

== Commercial performance ==
All About You debuted at number 27 on the US Billboard 200 albums chart and number eight in the US Top R&B/Hip-Hop albums chart, selling 18,000 copies in its first week of sales. As of June 25, 2015, the album has sold 186,000 copies in the United States. On October 16, 2017, the album was certified Platinum by the Recording Industry Association of America (RIAA) for combined sales and album-equivalent units of over 1,000,000 units.

== Track listing ==
No.	Title	Writer(s)	Producer(s)	Length
1.	"Down on Me" (featuring 50 Cent)	Felton; Curtis Jackson	Schultz	3:49
2.	"X's & O's"	Felton; James; Schultz	Schultz	3:53
3.	"All About You (Intro)"	Jeremih Felton	Mick Schultz	3:40
4.	"Take Off"	Felton; James; Schultz	Schultz	3:33
5.	"I Like" (featuring Ludacris)	Felton; Christopher Bridges	Schultz	3:39
6.	"Waiter / The 5 Senses"	Felton; James; Jackson	Schultz	5:50
7.	"Broken Down"	Felton	Schultz	3:40
8.	"Holding On"	Felton	Schultz	3:32
9.	"Wanna Get Up"	Felton; James; Schultz	Schultz	3:55
10.	"Sleepers"	Felton	Schultz	3:44
11.	"Love Don't Change"	Felton	Schultz	4:20

iTunes Store deluxe edition bonus tracks
No.	Title	Length
12.	"We Like To Party"	3:42
13.	"Love All Night"	2:56

== Charts ==
=== Weekly charts ===
Chart (2010)	Peak position
US Billboard 200	27
US Top R&B/Hip-Hop Albums (Billboard)	8

== Certifications ==
Region	Certification	Certified units/sales
United States (RIAA)	Platinum	1,000,000^{‡}
^{‡} Sales+streaming figures based on certification alone.
