= Billboard Year-End Hot Rap Songs of 2009 =

American music chart

This is a list of Billboard magazine's Top Hot Rap Songs of 2009.

No.	Title	Artist(s)
1	"Best I Ever Had"	Drake
2	"Dead and Gone"	T.I. featuring Justin Timberlake
3	"Live Your Life"	T.I. featuring Rihanna
4	"Heartless"	Kanye West
5	"Every Girl"	Young Money
6	"Kiss Me thru the Phone"	Soulja Boy featuring Sammie
7	"Whatever You Like"	T.I.
8	"Run This Town"	Jay-Z featuring Kanye West and Rihanna
9	"Throw It in the Bag"	Fabolous featuring The-Dream
10	"Successful"	Drake featuring Lil Wayne and Trey Songz
11	"Boom Boom Pow"	Black Eyed Peas
12	"Pop Champagne"	Jim Jones and Ron Browz featuring Juelz Santana
13	"Wetter"	Twista featuring Erika Shevon
14	"Ice Cream Paint Job"	Dorrough
15	"Ain't I"	Yung L.A. featuring T.I. and Young Dro
16	"Mrs. Officer"	Lil Wayne featuring Bobby Valentino and Kidd Kidd
17	"One More Drink"	Ludacris featuring T-Pain
18	"I Know You Want Me (Calle Ocho)"	Pitbull
19	"Right Round"	Flo Rida featuring Kesha
20	"Turn My Swag On"	Soulja Boy
21	"Forever"	Drake, Kanye West, Lil Wayne and Eminem
22	"Wasted Man"	Gucci Mane featuring Plies
23	"Hotel Room Service"	Pitbull
24	"You're a Jerk"	New Boyz
25	"Always Strapped"	Birdman featuring Lil Wayne and Mack Maine

== See also ==
- 2009 in music
- Billboard Year-End Hot 100 singles of 2009
- Billboard Year-End Hot R&B/Hip-Hop Songs of 2009
- List of Billboard number-one rap singles of 2009
