= Throw It Up =

Throw It Up may refer to:

== Music ==
- "Throw It Up", by J. Cole from The Come Up, 2007
- "Throw It Up", by Yelawolf from Radioactive, 2011
- "Throw It Up", by Lil' Jon & the East Side Boyz from Kings of Crunk, 2002
- "Throw It Up", by Cool & Dre from DJ Drama Presents: The Preview, 2008
- "Throw It Up", by U.N. from Heat in Here Vol. 1, 2010
- "Throw It Up", by Tyga, 2013
- "Throw It Up", by This D, 2013
- "Throw It Up", by Almighty Aziz from Vol. 4: The Redemption, 2005
- "Throw It Up", by D12 from the soundtrack for Crime Life: Gang Wars, 2005
- "Throw It Up", by Robb Banks, a freestyle track to promote Year of the Savage, 2015
- "Throw It Up", by Twisted Black from Street Fame, 2007
- "Throw It Up", by Naughty by Nature from Anthem Inc., 2011
- "Throw It Up", by Wooli from Mammoth, 2018
- "Throw It Up", a track from Trippie Red's mixtape Hate Is Dead, 2021
- "Throw It Up", from J Prince Presents R.N.D.S., 1999
- "Throw It Up", a single by Dom Corleo, 2025
- "Throw It Up", by Bijou from Diamond City, 2020
- "Throw It Up", by Saint Dog from USA (Unconformable Social Amputees), 2006
- "Throw It Up", by The Jacka & 12 Gauge Shotie from The Price of Money, 2009
- "Throw It Up, Throw It Up", a single by Con Funk Shun, 1996
- "Kings & Queens (Throw It Up)", by SoMo, 2013

== Other ==
- "Throw It Up", the last episode of the first season of Shake It Up, 2011
