= Ride (SoMo song) =

2013 single by American singer SoMo

Single by SoMo

from the album SoMo
- Released: December 7, 2013
- Genre: R&B
- Length: 4:49
- Label: Republic
- Songwriters: Joseph Somers-Morales; Donald Cody Tarpley Jr. Craig Klepto Tucker
- Producers: Donald Cody Tarpley Jr.; Mick Schultz

"Ride" is a song recorded by American singer SoMo. The song serves as the lead single from his debut self-titled studio album, SoMo. It was written by SoMo with Cody Tarpley, and produced by the latter. The song was released on December 7, 2013, by Republic Records.

Ride reached a peak of number 76 on the Billboard Hot 100 chart and number 11 on the US Hot R&B/Hip-Hop Songs. The song's music video was released on January 17, 2014.

The song's official remix features new verses by Ty Dolla Sign and K Camp.

== Composition ==
"Ride is written in the key of G♯ minor with a slow tempo of 58 beats per minute. The song follows a chord progression of Emaj7 – Bsus2 – D♯m7 – C♯m7, and SoMo's vocals span from F♯_{3} to D♯_{6}.

== Chart performance ==
=== Weekly charts ===
Chart (2013–14)	Peak position
US Billboard Hot 100	76
US Hot R&B/Hip-Hop Songs (Billboard)	11
US Rhythmic Airplay (Billboard)	12

=== Year-end charts ===
Chart (2014)	Position
US Hot R&B/Hip-Hop Songs (Billboard)	62
US Rhythmic (Billboard)	42

== Certifications ==
Region	Certification	Certified units/sales
Brazil (Pro-Música Brasil)	Gold	30,000^{‡}
United States (RIAA)	2× Platinum	2,000,000^{‡}
^{‡} Sales+streaming figures based on certification alone.

== Release history ==
Release dates and formats for "Ride"
Region	Date	Format	Label(s)	Ref.
United States	February 25, 2014	Mainstream airplay	Republic	

== Chase Rice version ==
"Ride"

Song by Chase Rice

from the album Ignite the Night (Party Edition)
- Genre: Pop
- Length: 4:01
- Label: Columbia Nashville; Dack Janiels
- Songwriters: Joseph Somers-Morales; Craig “Klepto” Tucker Donald Cody Tarpley Jr.
- Producers: Chad Carlson; Scott Cooke; Chris DeStefano; Rhett Akins

American country music singer Chase Rice recorded a version of "Ride" which was a bonus track on his album Ignite the Night. The version was recorded after Rice jokingly tweeted SoMo a Photoshopped cover of his face on SoMo's album, and SoMo tweeted back that Rice should record a country version of the song. Somo is featured in Rice's music video. This version reached No. 38 on the Hot Country Songs chart, and has sold 413,000 copies in the US as of February 2016.

=== Chart performance ===
Chart (2015)	Peak position
US Hot Country Songs (Billboard)	38

==== Year-end charts ====
Chart (2015)	Position
US Hot Country Songs (Billboard)	98

== Certifications ==
Certifications for "Ride"
Region	Certification	Certified units/sales
United States (RIAA)	Platinum	1,000,000^{‡}
^{‡} Sales+streaming figures based on certification alone.
