= Jeremih (album) =

Studio album by Jeremih
- Released: June 30, 2009
- Recorded: 2008–2009
- Genre: R&B
- Length: 51:54
- Label: Def Jam
- Producer: Mick Schultz (also exec.)

Jeremih chronology
Jeremih (2009)	All About You (2010)

Singles from Jeremih
- 1. "Birthday Sex" Released: February 25, 2009; 2. "Imma Star (Everywhere We Are)" Released: June 9, 2009; 3. "Break Up to Make Up" Released: November 17, 2009

Jeremih is the debut studio album by American R&B recording artist Jeremih. It was released on June 30, 2009, through Def Jam Recordings. The production on the album was handled by Mick Schultz who also co-wrote the album with Jeremih. To promote the release of the album, the album was posted online for an exclusive preview on MySpace.

Jeremih was supported by three singles: "Birthday Sex", "Imma Star (Everywhere We Are)" and "Break Up to Make Up". The album received generally positive reviews from music critics and was a commercial success. It debuted at number six on the US Billboard 200, selling 59,000 copies in its first week.

== Background ==
While attending Columbia College Chicago, Jeremih collaborated with record producer Mick Schultz. Jeremih began writing all of these songs, while Schultz produced the entire album. The duo recorded approximately 20 songs for the album. In February 2009, Jeremih met with the Def Jam Recordings CEO Russell Simmons and its executive vice president of A&R, Karen Kwak. After a vocal performance, Jeremih signed a recording contract with the label that same day.

== Singles ==
The lead single from the album, called "Birthday Sex" was released on March 24, 2009. The single topped it on the US Hot R&B/Hip-Hop Songs. The single even peaked it at number 4 on the US Billboard Hot 100 and number 58 on the Canadian Hot 100.

The album's second single, called "Imma Star (Everywhere We Are)" was released on June 9, 2009. The song peaked at number 23 on the US Hot R&B/Hip-Hop Songs and number 51 on the Billboard Hot 100 charts.

The album's third and final single, "Break Up to Make Up", impacted US rhythmic radio stations on November 17, 2009. The song peaked at 87 on the US Hot R&B/Hip-Hop Songs chart.

== Critical reception ==
Professional ratings
Aggregate scores
Source	Rating
Metacritic	70/100
Review scores
Source	Rating
AllMusic	3.5/5 stars
Sarasota Herald-Tribune	C−

Upon its release, Jeremih received generally positive reviews from most music critics. At Metacritic, which assigns a normalized rating out of 100 to reviews from mainstream critics, it received an average score of 70 based on four reviews.

Andy Kellman of AllMusic described Jeremih's vocals as "charmingly sly", expressing a comparison to Slim of 112 and Raphael Saadiq. Giving the album a C−, the Sarasota Herald-Tribune felt that the use of Auto-Tune made Jeremih sound like a "clone" of Kanye West, but showed "little of West's imagination on his debut album". Meanwhile, following the album's August 2009 UK release, noted R&B writer Pete Lewis of 'Blues & Soul' referred to it as "A promisingly-diverse R&B set which combines jiggy, club-flavoured tracks like the sexy 'That Body' and catchy 'My Ride' with classy soulful ballads like the hauntingly mellow 'Starting All Over' and wistful 'My Sunshine'.

== Commercial performance ==
Jeremih debuted at number six on the US Billboard 200 chart, selling 59,000 copies in the first week. This became Jeremih's first US top-ten debut. In its second week, the album dropped to number 15 on the chart, selling an additional 29,000 copies. On October 1, 2021, the album was certified platinum by the Recording Industry Association of America (RIAA) for combined sales and album-equivalent units of over one million units in the United States.

== Track listing ==
- All tracks written by Mick Schultz and Jeremy "Jeremih" Felton and produced by Mick Schultz; tracks 2 and 7 co-written by Keith James

No.	Title	Length
1.	"That Body"	3:54
2.	"Birthday Sex"	3:46
3.	"Break Up to Make Up"	3:47
4.	"Runway"	4:05
5.	"Raindrops"	4:33
6.	"Starting All Over"	4:39
7.	"Imma Star (Everywhere We Are)"	4:21
8.	"Jumpin"	3:20
9.	"Hatin' on Me"	3:28
10.	"My Sunshine"	4:19
11.	"My Ride"	3:41
12.	"Buh Bye"	4:09

iTunes Store bonus track
No.	Title	Length
13.	"Birthday Sex (Up-Tempo)"	3:57

== Personnel ==
- Tom Coyne – mastering
- Terese Joseph – A&R
- Karen Kwak – A&R
- Eric Peterson – guitar, mixing
- TaVon Sampson – art direction, cover design
- Mick Schultz – producer, engineer, executive producer
- Dion Stewart – stylist
- Jim "Big Jim" Wright – photography

== Charts ==
=== Weekly charts ===
Chart (2009)	Peak position
French Albums (SNEP)	100
UK Albums (OCC)	95
US Billboard 200	6
US Top R&B/Hip-Hop Albums (Billboard)	1

=== Year-end charts ===
Chart (2009)	Position
US Billboard 200	135
US Top R&B/Hip-Hop Albums (Billboard)	36

== Certifications ==
Region	Certification	Certified units/sales
United States (RIAA)	Platinum	1,000,000^{‡}
^{‡} Sales+streaming figures based on certification alone.
