= Keith James =

American rapper

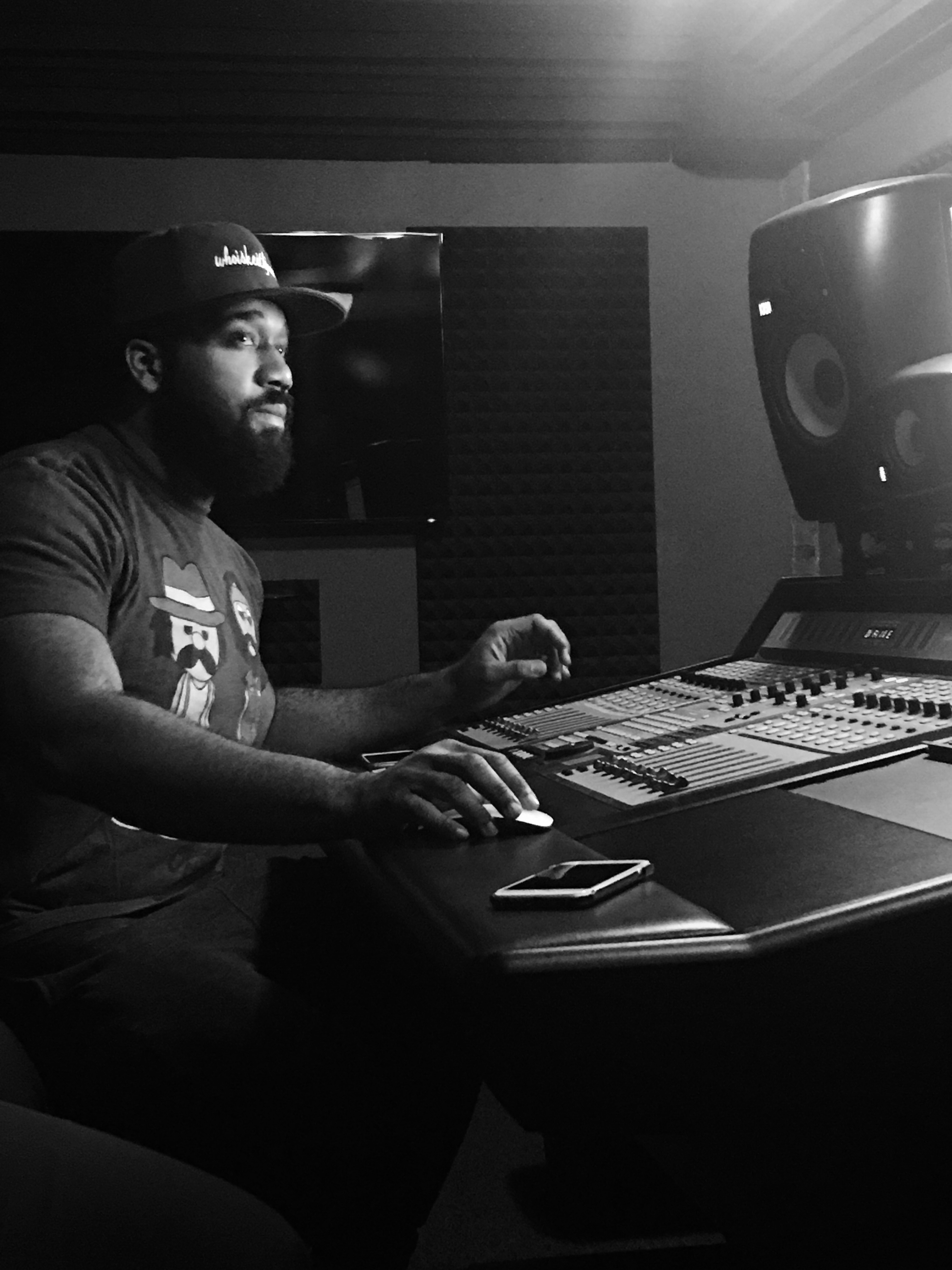
- James in 2016

Background information
- Born: Keith Eric James; February 4, 1987 (age 39); Chicago, Illinois, U.S.
- Genres: Hip-hop
- Occupations: Rapper; songwriter; record producer
- Years active: 2008–present

Keith Eric James (born February 4, 1987), formerly of the stage name Marcus Fench, is an American record producer, singer, songwriter and rapper from Chicago, Illinois. He is a frequent collaborator of fellow Chicago singer Jeremih and has worked with various artists such as 50 Cent, Ne-Yo, Nicki Minaj and Wale.

James began performing with his church choir at the age of nine, singing and playing piano and saxophone. James began to write music nightly shortly thereafter. In 2008, James co-wrote "Birthday Sex" with Jeremih and Mick Shultz, the former of whom performed the song. The trio collaborated on the 2009 follow-up single "Imma Star", which was certified platinum by the RIAA.

In 2015, James released his debut solo project From The Grey EP, lead with single release "Not My Day" and the remix, with a guest verse from singer Cee-Lo Green.

== Discography ==
- Jeremih - Jeremih (2009)
- Jeremih - All About You (2010)
- Nicki Minaj - The Pinkprint (2014)
- Jeremih - Late Nights Mixtape (2012) - executive producer
- Wale - "That Way" feat. Rick Ross & Jeremih
- Jeremih - "You're Mine"
- Diggy Simmons – "88" feat. Jadakiss
- Kevin Gates - "Stop Lyin'"
- Rotimi - "See You Later"
- DJ Drama - "My Moment" feat. 2 Chainz, Meek Mill & Jeremih
- French Montana - "Ballin Out" feat. Diddy & Jeremih
