= Loso's Way =

2009 album by Fabolous

Studio album / soundtrack album by Fabolous
- Released: July 28, 2009
- Recorded: 2007–2009, Verve Records
- Genre: Hip hop
- Length: 67:43
- Labels: Desert Storm; Street Family; Def Jam
- Producers: DJ Clue; Duro; Fabolous; Skane; Ryan Leslie; Jermaine Dupri; No I.D.; L Roc; Sid V; Syience; the Alchemist; Sean C & LV; Tricky Stewart; Streetrunner; L Pro; the Runners; DJ Khalil; BlackOut Movement; J.U.S.T.I.C.E. League; The Inkredibles; Rico Law; Kevin Cossom; Jones; The-Dream

Fabolous chronology
From Nothin' to Somethin' (2007)	Loso's Way (2009)	The Young OG Project (2014)

Singles from Loso's Way
- 1. "Throw It in the Bag" Released: May 12, 2009; 2. "My Time" Released: May 12, 2009; 3. "Everything, Everyday, Everywhere" Released: September 22, 2009; 4. "Money Goes, Honey Stay (When the Money Goes Remix)" Released: November 11, 2009

Loso's Way is the fifth studio album by American rapper Fabolous. The album was released on July 28, 2009, by Desert Storm Records, Street Family Records and Def Jam Recordings. The album's first two singles were released simultaneously on May 26, 2009: "Throw It in the Bag" (featuring The-Dream) and "My Time" (featuring Jeremih). Two other singles were subsequently released: Everything, Everyday, Everywhere" (featuring Keri Hilson) and "Money Goes, Honey Stay" (featuring Jay-Z).

== Background ==
A deluxe album was released on the same day as the standard release. The edition features a bonus DVD, (Loso's Way, the movie). The movie features Fabolous (and three of his friends). Fabolous is leaving a restaurant when he is shot. His friends quickly rush Fabolous to the hospital, but are stopped by the police after running a red light. Fellow rapper Styles P has a role in the movie. DJ Clue, DJ Khaled, Jadakiss, Swizz Beatz, DJ Envy, and Ryan Leslie make cameo appearances. The movie Loso's Way runs for 33:03 minutes. In order to view Loso's Way the movie, the deluxe album Loso's Way must be purchased.

== Critical reception ==
Professional ratings
Aggregate scores
Source	Rating
Metacritic	66/100
Review scores
Source	Rating
About	3/5 stars
AllMusic	3/5 stars
The Boston Globe	(favorable)
Entertainment Weekly	B+
Los Angeles Times	2.5/4 stars
Metro	(Classic)
Newsday	A
Robert Christgau	(dud)
Rolling Stone	2.5/5 stars
USA Today	4/4 stars

Loso's Way got a score of 66 out of 100 from Metacritic based on positive reviews from music critics. Several critics pointed out that the album revealed Fabolous' lyrical strengths and weaknesses.

AllMusic editor David Jeffries wrote that while "a concept album from a punch line rapper is an unattractive proposition," it was "fortunate that Loso's Way strays off topic" and ends up as "a standard issue Fabolous album with big singles [...] and the usual redundancy." He concluded that "this not-so-conceptual-after-all album points out both the rapper's limitations and his strengths." Slava Kuperstein of HipHopDX gave the album a 3.5 out of five stars and stated that Loso's Way may be the first completely focused album Fabolous has ever dropped, and the results confirm what all the hype was for in the first place.

== Commercial performance ==
The album debuted at number one on the Billboard 200, selling over 99,000 copies in its first week. It became Fabolous' first and only album to top the chart.

== Track listing ==
Loso's Way track listing
No.	Title	Writer(s)	Producer(s)	Length
1.	"The Way (Intro)"	John Jackson; Nicholas Warwar; Bart Howard	Streetrunner	4:09
2.	"My Time" (featuring Jeremih)	John Jackson; Andrew Harr; Jermaine Jackson; Kevin Cossom; Jeremy Felton	The Runners; Kevin "KC" Cossom (co.)	4:00
3.	"Imma Do It" (featuring Kobe)	John Jackson; Khalil Abdul-Rahman; Daniel Tannenbaum	DJ Khalil	3:59
4.	"Feel Like I'm Back"	John Jackson; Kevin Crowe; Erik Ortiz	J.U.S.T.I.C.E. League	4:28
5.	"Everything, Everyday, Everywhere" (featuring Keri Hilson)	John Jackson; Ryan Leslie; Keri Hilson	Ryan Leslie	4:07
6.	"Throw It in the Bag" (featuring The-Dream)	John Jackson; Christopher Stewart; Terius Nash	Tricky Stewart; The-Dream	3:51
7.	"Money Goes, Honey Stay (When the Money Goes Remix)" (featuring Jay-Z)	John Jackson; Jermaine Dupri; Shawn Carter; Sami Wilf	Jermaine Dupri; Sami Wilf	3:45
8.	"Salute" (featuring Lil Wayne)	John Jackson; Dwayne Carter; Miguel Jimenez	Rico Law	4:27
9.	"There He Go" (featuring Paul Cain, Red Café and Freck Billionaire)	John Jackson; Winston Thomas; Danny Schofield; Winston Atkinson; Paul Cain; Jermaine Denny; Jeffrey Whitters	The Blackout Movement	4:31
10.	"The Fabolous Life" (featuring Ryan Leslie)	John Jackson; Leslie	Ryan Leslie	4:07
11.	"Makin' Love" (featuring Ne-Yo)	John Jackson; Dion Wilson; Shaffer Smith; Keith Crouch; Kipper Jones	Jermaine Dupri; No I.D.	4:07
12.	"Last Time" (featuring Trey Songz)	John Jackson; Dupri; Johntá Austin; James Phillips	Jermaine Dupri; LRoc	4:10
13.	"Pachanga"	John Jackson; Sidda Philip; Kenneth Gamble; Leon A. Huff; Nasir Jones; Gordon Sumner; Dominic Miller	Sid V	4:14
14.	"Lullaby"	John Jackson; Alan Maman	The Alchemist	4:19
15.	"Stay" (featuring Marsha Ambrosius)	John Jackson; Reginald Perry	Syience	3:41
16.	"I Miss My Love"	John Jackson; Deleno Matthews; Levar Coppin; Deric Angelettie	Sean C & LV	5:49

iTunes Store bonus tracks
No.	Title	Producer(s)	Length
17.	"A Toast to the Good Life" (European album exclusive)	L Pro	2:25
18.	"Welcome to My Workplace"	Sean C. & L.V.	1:52

Japan bonus tracks
No.	Title	Producer(s)	Length
17.	"Never Let It Go" (featuring Keys)	DJ Khalil	4:13
18.	"Bang Bang"	Sean C. & L.V.	2:16

Sample credits

- "The Way (Intro)" contains sample from "Fly Me to the Moon", written by Bart Howard, and performed by Leslie Uggams.
- "Makin' Love" contains samples from "Brokenhearted", written by Keith Crouch and Kipper Jones, and performed by Brandy.
- "Pachanga" contains samples from "You Know How To Make Me Feel So Good", written by Kenneth Gamble and Leon A. Huff, and performed by Harold Melvin & the Blue Notes. It also contains interpolations from "The Message", written by Nasir Jones, Gordon Sumner, and Dominic Miller.

== Personnel ==
- Mike "I.L.O." Aiello – keyboards (1)
- Chris Athens – mastering
- Steven Barlow – assistant engineer (11, 12), additional tracking and editing assistant (7)
- Blackout – engineer (9)
- Just Blaze – scratches (14)
- Kevin "KC" Cossom – background vocals (2)
- Juro "Mez" Davis – engineer (15)
- Jermaine Dupri – mixing (7, 11, 12)
- Supa Engineer DURO – mixing (1–6, 8–10, 13–16)
- Casey Flynn – engineer (9)
- Ed "Wolverine" Goodson – bass and guitar (16)
- Christy Hall – production assistant (6)
- Edd "Odd" Hartwell – assistant engineer (11)
- Brandon "Bizzy" Hollemon – additional guitars (9)
- John Horesco IV – engineer (11, 12), additional tracking and editing (7)
- J.U.S.T.I.C.E. League – engineers (4)
- Gimel "Young Guru" Keaton – engineer (7)
- Keke and Amy – production coordination (8)
- Danny Keyz – keyboards (3)
- Ken "Duro" Ifill – engineer (1–16)
- DJ Khalil – engineer (3), drum programming (3)
- Rico Law – engineer (8)
- Ryan Leslie – engineer (5, 10), instrumentation (5, 10)
- Mark Lewis – engineer (11)
- Chris "TEK" O'Ryan – engineer (6)
- Carlos Oyanedel – assistant mix engineer (7, 11, 12)
- Anthony "Smash" Randolph – additional keyboards (1)
- Lenesha Randolph – background vocals (16)
- Zach Steele – assistant engineer (6, 13)
- Syience – instrumentation (15)
- Phil Tan – mixing (7, 11, 12)
- Brian "B-LUV" Thomas – engineer (6)
- Brian Turner – intro announcer (1)
- Jeff "Supa Jeff" Villanueva – vocal engineer (2), additional Pro Tools engineering (2)
- Finis "KY" White – engineer (8)
- Doug Wilson – engineer (16), keyboards (16)
- Eric Young – assistant engineer (12)
- Jordan "DJ Swivel" Young – assistant engineer (1–16), assistant mix engineer (1–6, 8–10, 13–16)

== Charts ==
=== Weekly charts ===
Weekly chart performance for Loso's Way
Chart (2009)	Peak position
Canadian Albums (Billboard)	21
US Billboard 200	1
US Top R&B/Hip-Hop Albums (Billboard)	1
US Soundtrack Albums (Billboard)	1

=== Year-end charts ===
Year-end chart performance for Loso's Way
Chart (2009)	Position
US Billboard 200	120
US Top R&B/Hip-Hop Albums (Billboard)	30
US Soundtrack Albums (Billboard)	9

== Certifications ==
Certifications for Loso's Way
Region	Certification	Certified units/sales
United States (RIAA)	Gold	500,000^{‡}
^{‡} Sales+streaming figures based on certification alone.
