= Orange Krush =

University of Illinois student organization

- Founded: 1975 (RSO); 1998 (Charitable Foundation)
- Founder: Lou Henson and four students
- Type: RSO/Charitable Foundation
- Location: Champaign, Illinois
- Region served: Champaign–Urbana Metropolitan Area; Central Illinois; Illinois; United States
- Members: 1,500
- Affiliations: University of Illinois at Urbana–Champaign
- Website: Orange Krush Homepage
- Formerly called: Orange Crunch (1975-1979); Orange Crush (1979-1980's)

Orange Krush is a branch of the registered student organization (RSO), Illini Pride, at the University of Illinois at Urbana–Champaign. In its current form, the Organization has two faces. First, the Orange Krush is the student cheering section for the University of Illinois men's basketball team. Second, the Orange Krush exists as a charitable organization known as the Orange Krush Foundation.

The name Orange Krush is a pun of the soft drink Orange Crush.

== Orange Krush Student Section ==
The Orange Krush was founded in 1975 by new head coach Lou Henson and four students. The initial membership totaled 100 students.

== Orange Krush Foundation ==
Established in 1998, the Foundation is the charitable side of the Orange Krush organization. One half of all money raised from the pledge program, minus the cost of tickets for each member and any costs incurred in a roadtrip to another Big Ten school, is then donated to various charities in the Champaign-Urbana area. The other half goes to the DIA (Division of Intercollegiate Athletics) to fund various athletic scholarships, including the Matt Heldman and Rod Cardinal Scholarship.

Since 2002, the foundation has donated over $75,000 to the Cunningham Children's Home which has served at-risk youth from the Champaign-Urbana Metropolitan Area for almost 120 years. Cunningham assists youth with foster care and transitional living, provides residential care treatment, and supports special education. With these funds, Cunningham has been able to build a new playground, an educational and recreation center, and purchase an industrial kitchen range.

In 2005, the Orange Krush Foundation presented the Jimmy V Foundation with a check for $50,000. The money represented the one-millionth dollar donated in the Orange Krush Foundation's eight-year existence.

As of the conclusion of the 2012-2013 season, the Orange Krush Foundation has donated more than a total of $2.5 million to various local, state, and national organisations such as the Cunningham Children's Home in Urbana, Illinois, Orpheum Children's Science Museum, Eastern Illinois Foodbank, Make-A-Wish Foundation of Illinois, and Coaches vs. Cancer.

== Membership ==
Membership in the Orange Krush is open to any student who is a member of Illini Pride, the school-wide student athletic boosters. Prospective members collect donations in the form of flat pledges. Members can be White Level, Blue Level, or Orange Level members. (Orange Level receiving more perks and Orange Krush swag).

== Game Day procedures ==
Seating for Orange Krush members includes approximately 700 seats in the lower bowl of the State Farm Center. All seats are distributed on a first-come, first-served basis. To gain entry to a game, a member must wait in line inside the State Farm Center Krush Club until the 1 hour to game-time mark.

Year	Song Artist	Song Title
2004–2005	Zombie Nation	Kernkraft 400
2005–2006	Nelly	Heart of a Champion
2006–2007	Young Joc	It's Goin' Down
2007–2008	DJ Khaled feat. Akon, T.I., Rick Ross, Fat Joe, Birdman & Lil Wayne	We Takin' Over
2008–2009	Kevin Rudolf feat. Lil Wayne/Zombie Nation	Let It Rock/Kernkraft 400 (custom mix)
2009–2010	Fabolous feat. Jeremih/Zombie Nation	My Time (Fabolous song)/Kernkraft 400 (custom mix)
2010–2011	DJ Khaled feat. Ludacris, Snoop Dogg, Rick Ross, & T-Pain/Zombie Nation	All I Do is Win/Kernkraft 400 (custom mix)

== Notable Road-Trips ==
Historically, a group of UI students who act like putzes under the moniker Orange Krush used elaborate disguises to gain access to away games. In the spring of 2005, 100 members posed as "Youth Action", a fictitious Chicago-area youth-group, to get tickets to a game at Michigan. The Krush was offered a tour of the Crisler Arena, but declined. Instead, they were also offered a photo opportunity with then coach Tommy Amaker, which the Krush took advantage of before the game. The Krush did not reveal themselves as Orange-clad crazies until just before tip-off.

In 2006, the Krush traveled to Minnesota and purchased student-section T-shirts to disguise themselves. After repeated successful trips, many Big 10 ticket offices imposed restrictions on tickets for Illinois games in an attempt to quell the invasions. In the spring of 2007, the Orange Krush posed as a Chicago-area Penn State Alumni organization and were able to get prime tickets right behind the basket, directly adjacent to the Penn State student section. They invaded Michigan in 2008, Purdue in 2009, Iowa in 2010, Minnesota in 2011, Nebraska in 2012, Northwestern in 2013, Penn State in 2014, Iowa in 2015, Minnesota in 2016, Michigan in 2017, Northwestern in 2018, Purdue in 2019, and Northwestern in 2020, with about 150 members participating every year. During the 2016 trip to Minnesota, a group of about 15 Krush members managed to get seats in the front row of Minnesota's student section and revealed their orange after the first Illinois bucket. Opposing Universities have imposed restricted ticket sales for games against Illinois because of this.

== Accolades ==
ESPN college basketball analyst and National Basketball Hall of Famer Dick Vitale has been quoted as saying the following about the Orange Krush,

"The Orange Krush are super, scintillating and sensational! They are a fantastic sixth man for the Fighting Illini. However, what makes them so unique is their willingness to help people in need and helping out with various charities, such as the V Foundation. Yes, they are special. To put it in ‘Vitalese’ they are awesome, baby, with a capital A!"

In 2006, the Orange Krush was named by Sports Illustrated as the second best student section in the country, behind only Duke University's Cameron Crazies.
