= I Like (Jeremih song) =

Single by Jeremih featuring Ludacris

from the album All About You
- Released: July 6, 2010
- Genre: R&B
- Length: 3:38
- Label: Def Jam
- Songwriter(s): Jeremih Felton; Christopher Bridges; Mick Schultz; Keith James
- Producer(s): Mick Schultz

Jeremih singles chronology
"Break Up to Make Up" (2009)	"I Like" (2010)	"Down on Me" (2010)

Ludacris singles chronology
"Porn Star Dancing" (2010)	"I Like" (2010)	"Saturday Night" (2010)

"I Like" (stylised as "i Like") is a song by American singer Jeremih and is produced by Mick Schultz. The song features rapper Ludacris. It is the lead single from his second album All About You. The song was released to iTunes on July 6, 2010, by Def Jam.

== Music video ==
The music video for the song was directed Ray Kay and was shot on location on a boat. It features Ludacris and a host of beautiful women and was released on September 1, 2010, on iTunes by Def Jam.

== Charts ==
=== Weekly charts ===
Chart (2010)	Peak position
US Bubbling Under Hot 100 (Billboard)	16
US Hot R&B/Hip-Hop Songs (Billboard)	25

=== Year-end charts ===
Chart (2010)	Position
US Hot R&B/Hip-Hop Songs (Billboard)	89

== Certifications ==
Region	Certification	Certified units/sales
United States (RIAA)	Gold	500,000^{‡}
^{‡} Sales+streaming figures based on certification alone.

== Release history ==
Country	Date	Format	Label
United States	July 6, 2010	Digital download	Island Def Jam
