= Everything, Everyday, Everywhere =

Single by Fabolous featuring Keri Hilson and Ryan Leslie

from the album Loso's Way
- Released: September 22, 2009
- Recorded: 2009
- Genre: Hip-hop
- Label: Def Jam
- Songwriters: Keri Hilson; John Jackson; Ryan Leslie
- Producer: Ryan Leslie

Fabolous singles chronology
"My Time" (2009)	"Everything, Everyday, Everywhere" (2009)	"Say Aah" (2009)

Keri Hilson singles chronology
"Number One" (2009)	"Everything, Everyday, Everywhere" (2009)	"Hold My Hand" (2009)

Music video
- "Fabolous - Everything, Everyday, Everywhere ft. Keri Hilson, Ryan Leslie" on YouTube

"Everything, Everyday, Everywhere" is a song by American rapper Fabolous, released by Def Jam Recordings on September 22, 2009 as the third single from his fifth album, Loso's Way (2009). It features guest appearances from American singers Keri Hilson and Ryan Leslie, both of whom co-wrote the track with Fabolous, while Leslie produced it.

== Music video ==
The music video for the song shows Fabolous and Keri Hilson performing at a party. In the video, people are getting their picture taken. DJ Khaled, Trey Songz, Rick Ross, Timbaland, Polow da Don, Rich Boy, DJ Clue, Rocko, Red Café, T-Pain, Fat Joe, Adrienne Bailon, Amerie, and Ace Hood make cameo appearances. The video was listed at #98 on BET's Notarized: Top 100 Videos of 2009 countdown.

== Trivia ==
The song was used in Gossip Girl, Season 3 Episode 17 "Inglorious Basstards."

== Charts ==
Chart (2009)	Peak position
U.S. Billboard Bubbling Under Hot 100 Singles	3
U.S. Billboard Hot R&B/Hip-Hop Songs	31
U.S. Billboard Rap Songs	10
