= Julio D =

Italian singer-songwriter, record producer, filmmaker and author

Giuliano Di Paolo
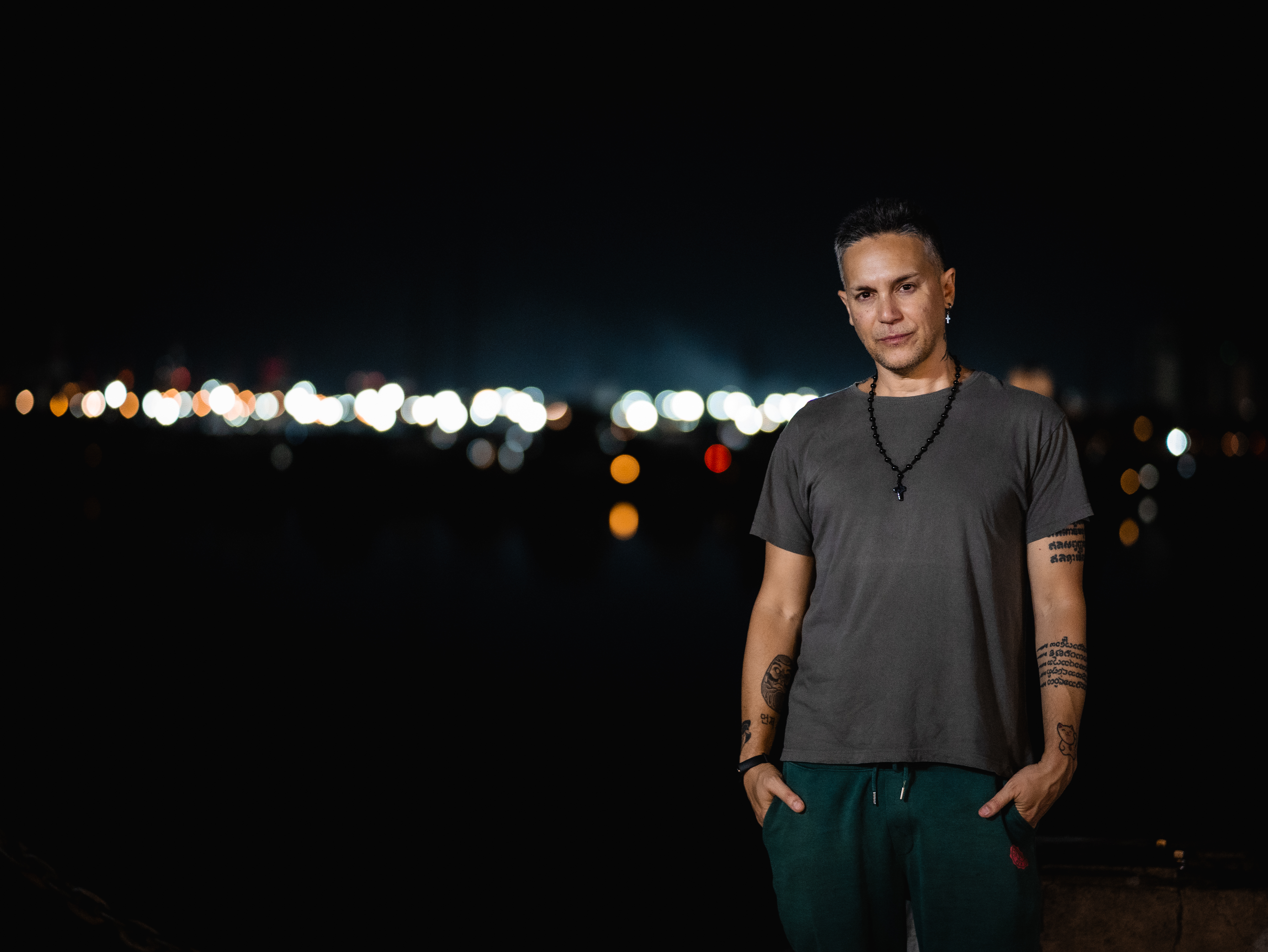
- Di Paolo in 2025

Background information
- Also known as: Julio D
- Born: Giuliano Di Paolo; 27 July 1977 (age 49); Milan, Italy
- Genres: Pop, R&B, world music
- Occupations: Singer-songwriter, record producer, filmmaker, author
- Instruments: Vocals, guitar, bass, keyboards
- Years active: 2011–present
- Label: Art Emotion
- Website: giulianodipaolo.com

Giuliano Di Paolo (born 27 July 1977), formerly known professionally as Julio D, is an Italian singer-songwriter, record producer, filmmaker and author. His earlier music was released under the stage name Julio D. Contemporary music publications identified Julio D as the stage name of Giuliano Di Paolo.

== Music career ==
=== 2011–2020: releases as Julio D ===
Di Paolo's early recordings were released under the name Julio D. The Spanish-language EP Sabes mi nombre was released worldwide by Art Emotion on 14 September 2011. Better Man followed in 2013.

In 2014, Outsider was released as a five-track EP. Music Existence described the project as combining soul and electronic elements, while Indie Music News identified "Niente Di Più" as its first single.

The studio album You Can't Stop Us was released in 2017. It was followed by Inner Revolution, a six-track EP released in 2018 and featuring collaborations with Antonia Marquee, Zindy Laursen and Gyr.

Further releases under the Julio D name included "Kings & Queens" in 2019 and "Surrounding Love (Rkadia Remix)" featuring Zindy in 2020.

=== 2025–present: releases as Giuliano Di Paolo ===
From 2025, Di Paolo resumed releasing new material under his birth name. "By My Side" and Finally Here were released in 2025, with Finally Here issued in collaboration with Raylaen Estoya.

In 2026 he released "Stay" with Roxeerd, followed by "Too Much Alike", "Frozen in a Frame" and "Hollow & Hush".

Current streaming profiles also credit some recordings originally released during the Julio D period to Giuliano Di Paolo, including "I Belong to You" (2017), "Beautiful" (2017) and "Dreams" (2018). These recordings predate the current phase and originate from the earlier Julio D catalogue.

== Discography ==
=== Albums and EPs as Julio D ===
Year	Title	Type
2011	Sabes mi nombre	EP
2013	Better Man	Studio album
2014	Outsider	EP
2017	You Can't Stop Us	Studio album
2018	Inner Revolution	EP

=== Recent singles as Giuliano Di Paolo ===
Year	Title	Collaborator / featured artist
2025	"By My Side"	—
2025	"Finally Here"	Raylaen Estoya
2026	"Stay"	Roxeerd
2026	"Too Much Alike"	—
2026	"Frozen in a Frame"	—
2026	"Hollow & Hush"	—

== Other work ==
Outside music, Di Paolo has worked in photography, filmmaking and digital media, producing travel, documentary and creative content through his online platforms.

Di Paolo is the founder of Art Emotion Labs, an independent label and creative studio. According to its official website, the label works across music production, release management, catalogue development, new-media content and international collaborations, and also releases music written or produced by Di Paolo.

== Books ==
- 12 Mesi per Cambiare Vita (2021)
- L'amore è la cura (2023)
