= My Time (Fabolous song) =

Single by Fabolous featuring Jeremih

from the album Loso's Way
- Released: May 12, 2009
- Recorded: 2009
- Genre: Hip hop; R&B
- Length: 4:00 (album version); 2:25 (music video edit)
- Label: Desert Storm; Def Jam
- Songwriters: John Jackson; Jeremy Felton; Kevin Cossom; Andrew Harr
- Producer: The Runners

Fabolous singles chronology
"Throw It in the Bag" (2009)	"My Time" (2009)	"Everything, Everyday, Everywhere" (2009)

Jeremih singles chronology
"Birthday Sex" (2009)	"My Time" (2009)	"Imma Star (Everywhere We Are)" (2009)

"My Time" is a song by American rapper Fabolous, released by Def Jam Recordings on May 12, 2009 as the joint-lead single from his fifth album, Loso's Way (2009). The song features a guest appearance from Def Jam labelmate and newcomer Jeremih, who co-wrote the track with Fabolous, Kevin Cossom and its producers, the Runners. Jeremih, being his second mainstream appearance, utilizes Auto-Tune during his performance on the hook. The album's fourth single, "Money Goes, Honey Stay" (featuring Jay-Z), is featured on its B-side.

== Music video ==
The video for "My Time" released on May 28, 2009. Guest performer Jeremih does not appear in the video; his verse was also cut in favor of a snippet of one of the album's then-forthcoming singles, "Everything, Everyday, Everywhere", which is heard at the end. The latter song's guest performer, Ryan Leslie, appears in the segment to accompany its inclusion.

== Usage in popular culture ==
- This song is played before games at Yankee Stadium.
- The song was used in the commercial for the RBI World Series on MLB Network.
- The song was used in the America's Best Dance Crew season 4 premiere as the intro for the season.
- The song was used as the theme song for the 2009 NBA draft.
- The song was featured in the introduction video before Cleveland Cavaliers home games during the 2009–10 season.
- The song is featured in the introduction video before Toronto Raptors home games during the 2010–11 season.
- The song was featured in the introduction video before New Orleans Hornets home games during the 2009–10 season.
- This song was played during games at the 2010 ACC baseball tournament.
- This song was used as the theme song for a New York Knicks season preview program on the MSG Network before the start of the 2009–10 NBA season.
- This song was used as the theme song for EAW's Pain for Pride II.
- This song is used during halftime at home games for the Alabama Crimson Tide.
- This song was used during the 2011 ESPY Awards during the "Best Team" award video.
- This song was used to introduce the Fighting Illini student section, the Orange Krush, during 2009–10 basketball season.
- This song is used by Milwaukee Brewers pitcher Yovani Gallardo as his pre-game warm up song as the team takes the field.
- This song was used by Amir Khan as the first part of his entrance song in which he was facing Danny Garcia.
- This song is used by UFC fighter Ronaldo "Jacare" Souza as his entrance song. It's also used as an entrance song by Japanese MMA star, Kyoji Horiguchi.

== Charts ==
Chart (2009)	Peak Position
U.S. Billboard Bubbling Under Hot 100	8
U.S. Billboard Bubbling Under R&B/Hip-Hop Singles	2
U.S. Billboard Rhythmic Top 40	25
U.S. Billboard Pop 100	99
