= SoMo (album) =

Studio album by SoMo
- Released: April 8, 2014
- Recorded: 2013
- Genre: R&B
- Length: 34:42
- Label: Republic
- Producers: Mick Schultz; Cody Tarpley

Singles from SoMo
- 1. "Ride" Released: December 7, 2013; 2. "Show Off" Released: April 8, 2014; 3. "Hush" Released: October 6, 2014; 4. "Back To The Start" Released: December 3, 2014; 5. "We Can Make Love" Released: December 15, 2014

SoMo is the debut self-titled studio album by American singer SoMo. It was released on April 8, 2014, by Republic Records. Mick Schultz and Cody Tarpley primarily handled the album's production.

== Background ==
On February 12, 2014, SoMo announced the release date of his self-titled debut album set for April 8, 2014.

== Singles ==
On December 7, 2013, the first single, "Ride," was released. On January 17, 2014, the music video was released for "Ride."

"Show Off" was sent to US Rhythmic Radio on April 8, 2014, as the album's second single.

"Hush" was released as the third single from the album. The music video was released on October 6, 2014.

== Commercial performance ==
The album debuted at #6 on the Billboard 200, selling around 20,000–25,000 units. It also entered the Billboard Top R&B/Hip-Hop Albums at #2, the highest debut for an artist since November 2013.

== Track listing ==
No.	Title	Writer(s)	Length
1.	"TMWYKAL"	Joseph Somers-Morales	1:02
2.	"I Do It All for You"	Mick Schultz; Somers-Morales	3:34
3.	"Show Off"	Schultz; Somers-Morales	3:05
4.	"We Can Make Love"	Schultz; Somers-Morales	4:29
5.	"Crash"	Schultz; Somers-Morales	3:27
6.	"Blind"	Somers-Morales; Cody Tarpley	1:06
7.	"Back to the Start"	Schultz; Somers-Morales; Tarpley	3:24
8.	"Fire"	Schultz; Somers-Morales	3:10
9.	"Hush"	Schultz; Somers-Morales	3:17
10.	"Ride"	Somers-Morales	4:49
11.	"Red Lighter"	Schultz; Somers-Morales; Tarpley	3:19
Total length:			34:42

== Personnel ==
Credits for SoMo adapted from Allmusic.

- Eric Peterson – mastering
- Brian Schultz – bass
- Mick Schultz – bass, composer, drums, engineer, guitar, keyboards, percussion, producer, programming
- John Somers-Morales – guitar
- Joseph Somers-Morales – primary artist, composer, executive producer
- Cody Tarpley – additional production, bass, composer, engineer, guitar, keyboards

== Charts ==
=== Weekly charts ===
Chart (2014)	Peak position
US Billboard 200	6
US Top R&B/Hip-Hop Albums (Billboard)	2

=== Year-end charts ===
Chart (2014)	Position
US Top R&B/Hip-Hop Albums (Billboard)	55

== Certifications ==
Certifications for SoMo
Region	Certification	Certified units/sales
United States (RIAA)	Gold	500,000^{‡}
^{‡} Sales+streaming figures based on certification alone.
