= Imma Star (Everywhere We Are) =

Song by Jeremih

Single by Jeremih

from the album Jeremih
- Released: June 9, 2009
- Recorded: 2009
- Genre: R&B
- Length: 4:20 (album version); 4:00 (radio edit)
- Label: Def Jam
- Songwriters: Jeremy Felton; Keith James; Mick Schultz
- Producer: Mick Schultz

Jeremih singles chronology
"My Time" (2009)	"Imma Star (Everywhere We Are)" (2009)	"Break Up to Make Up" (2009)

Music video
- "Imma Star (Everywhere We Are)" on YouTube

"Imma Star (Everywhere We Are)" is a song by the American R&B recording artist Jeremih. It is the second single released from his self-titled debut album. The music video was released in July 2009 and was directed by Marc Klasfeld.

== Music video ==
The video shows Jeremih searching for a job and going around town to impress others, in attempts to show he is rich. He fails and others are disgusted by him. During the video he is seen flirting with a girl. He invites her into his car, where they watch a television that has been taped to the back of the headrest. He takes her to a club where he unsuccessfully attempts to bribe the bouncer with coins. After being rejected, they head to a drive-through fast-food chain, where he buys his suitress a half-eaten hot dog (the saleswoman eats half of it, as collateral for him not being able to pay for a full one). Disgusted by this, his date leaves him at the drive-through. The video finishes with Jeremih waking up to the fact that his follies were just a dream, and that he is indeed wealthy.

The video was ranked at #89 on BET's Notarized: Top 100 Videos of 2009 countdown.

== Chart performance ==
"Imma Star (Everywhere We Are)" debuted at number 96 on the Billboard Hot 100 the week of August 8, 2009. Seven weeks later, it peaked at number 51 the week of September 26, and stayed on the chart for twenty weeks.

=== Weekly charts ===
Chart (2009)	Peak position
US Billboard Hot 100	51
US Hot R&B/Hip-Hop Songs (Billboard)	23
US Rhythmic Airplay (Billboard)	12

=== Year-end charts ===
Chart (2009)	Position
US Hot R&B/Hip-Hop Songs (Billboard)	93

== Certifications ==
Region	Certification	Certified units/sales
United States (RIAA)	Platinum	1,000,000^{‡}
^{‡} Sales+streaming figures based on certification alone.
