= Throw It in the Bag =

Single by Fabolous featuring The-Dream

from the album Loso's Way
- Released: May 12, 2009
- Recorded: 2009
- Genre: Hip hop; R&B
- Length: 3:51 (original version); 4:05 (remix version)
- Label: Desert Storm; Def Jam
- Songwriters: John Jackson; Terius Nash; Christopher Stewart
- Producers: Tricky Stewart; The-Dream

Fabolous singles chronology
"She Got Her Own" (2008)	"Throw It in the Bag" (2009)	"My Time" (2009)

The-Dream singles chronology
"Walkin' on the Moon" (2009)	"Throw It In the Bag" (2009)	"Digital Girl" (2009)

"Throw It in the Bag" is a song by American rapper Fabolous, released by Def Jam Recordings on May 12, 2009 as the lead single from his fifth album, Loso's Way (2009). It features a guest appearance from American singer and Def Jam labelmate The-Dream, who also provided the production alongside Tricky Stewart — both of whom co-wrote the song with Fabolous. It peaked at number 14 on the Billboard Hot 100—becoming the only single from Loso's Way to enter the chart—and received platinum certification by the Recording Industry Association of America (RIAA).

Later in 2009, a pop rap remix of the song (often referred to as "Throw It In the Bag Pt. 2") was released. Issued only in a promotional format, it contains a guest appearance from Canadian rapper Drake, as well as alternate verses from Fabolous, although the subject matter remains unchanged. The production, instead handled by Shatek King, heavily samples The-Dream's 2009 song "Fancy".

== Background ==
Lyrically, "Throw It In The Bag" finds Fabolous and The-Dream discussing their inclination to splurge on their romantic partners.

== Music video ==
The video for "Throw It In The Bag" was released on May 28, 2009, and was directed by Erik White. It features Claudia Jordan as a thief who is stealing from a jewelry store. Talking about Vazi A's character in the video, Fabolous says "I'm kinda feelin' cats. I'm feeling her integrity, I'm feeling her style, I'm feeling her going out and taking what she wants. By the end of the video, I'm kinda looking past her being this big thief, and maybe next time she throws things in the bag is because I'm buying it for her." Christina Milian (Dream's ex-wife), Irv Gotti, DJ Clue and Ryan Leslie all make cameo appearances in the video. The music video was filmed in New York City’s Meatpacking District.

The video won for Best Viewer's Choice at the 2009 BET Hip Hop Awards and ranked at number 24 on BET's Notarized Top 100 Videos of 2009 countdown.

== Remix ==
The official remix of the song features rapper Drake. The chorus is a sped up sample of "Fancy" off of The-Dream's second studio album, Love vs. Money, while production was handled by Shatek from Beats on Film. The only similarities are the subject matter and the line "Just throw it in the bag." In 2010, the remix was serviced to iTunes in a digital 45 format, also including the original version as a B-side.

This version has been used by rappers such as Ace Hood, Styles P, Ur Boy Bangs, and Lil Wayne, with Wayne using the remix's beat for his No Ceilings mixtape.

== Official versions ==
- "Throw It in the Bag" (original version / explicit album version) – 3:51
- "Throw It in the Bag" (remix version) – 4:05

== Charts ==
"Throw It in the Bag" debuted at number 84 on the Billboard Hot 100 in July 2009 and peaked at number 14.

Chart (2009)	Peak position
US Billboard Hot 100	14
US Hot R&B/Hip-Hop Songs (Billboard)	4
US Hot Rap Songs (Billboard)	2
US Pop Airplay (Billboard)	33
US Rhythmic Airplay (Billboard)	5

=== Year-end charts ===
Chart (2009)	Position
US Billboard Hot 100	71
US Hot R&B/Hip-Hop Songs (Billboard)	38
US Rhythmic (Billboard)	25

== Certifications ==
Region	Certification	Certified units/sales
New Zealand (RMNZ)	Gold	15,000^{‡}
United States (RIAA)	Platinum	1,000,000^{‡}
^{‡} Sales+streaming figures based on certification alone.
