= SoMo =

American singer-songwriter (born 1987)

- Born: Joseph Anthony Somers-Morales; September 11, 1987 (age 38); Austin, Texas, U.S.
- Origin: Denison, Texas, U.S.
- Genres: R&B; hip hop; pop
- Occupations: Singer; songwriter
- Instruments: Vocals; piano; guitar
- Years active: 2000–present
- Label: Republic
- Website: officialsomo.com

Joseph Anthony Somers-Morales (born September 11, 1987), known professionally as SoMo, is an American singer and songwriter.

== Career ==
In 2009, SoMo started recording covers in Denton, Texas. A successful 2011 mash-up of Drake's Take Care led a massive draw to his YouTube channel, which has garnered 300M+ views on the platform. Throughout 2012, SoMo began to work on original music. His efforts in the studio yielded the independent debut mixtape My Life, merging R&B spirit with pop soul and showcasing his voice and songwriting. The mixtape was released for free on his birthday, September 11, 2013. Simultaneously, he released a new cover video every Sunday as part of his "SoMo Sunday" campaign.

Struck by the success of SoMo's independent national tour, Republic Records partnered with him in October 2013. Following the re-release of his single "Ride" in November 2013, the song peaked at #76 on the Billboard Hot 100. On February 12, 2014, SoMo announced the release date of his self-titled debut album, "SoMo", set for April 8, 2014.

== Discography ==
- SoMo (2014)
- The Answers (2017)
- A Beautiful November (2018)
- I Had Another Dream (2020)
- The Duality of Man (2021)
- 9 Lives (2024)
