= Birthday Sex =

Single by Jeremih

from the album Jeremih
- Released: February 25, 2009
- Recorded: September 2008
- Genre: R&B
- Length: 3:52
- Label: Def Jam
- Songwriters: Jeremy Felton; Keith James; Mick Schultz
- Producer: Schultz

Jeremih singles chronology
"Birthday Sex" (2009)	"My Time" (2009)

"Birthday Sex" is the debut single by American singer Jeremih. It served as the lead single for his self-titled debut studio album (2009). The song was written by Jeremih, Keith James, and Mick Schultz, the latter of whom also helmed its production. "Birthday Sex" peaked at number four on the Billboard Hot 100, peaked the Hot R&B/Hip-Hop Songs chart, and has received 5× platinum certification by the Recording Industry Association of America.

In 2023, Burna Boy sampled the song in his track "City Boys".

== Background ==
Jeremih wrote and recorded "Birthday Sex" in September 2008, initially calling it "Birthday Text" but later revising the name. Initially, a song entitled "My Ride" was scheduled to be released as the first single. Jeremih credited deejay Bam of Chicago's Power 92 for selecting "Birthday Sex" for radio play. The song is based on his own birthday experience. He thought that "someone would've written a song like that already—one that caters to females on their day". Meanwhile, during his first international press interview, Jeremih told noted UK R&B writer Pete Lewis of 'Blues & Soul': "I do think the lyrical concept really did help the song out! To where I feel it's gonna be a timeless record that'll still be played YEARS from now – simply because it's become a new birthday anthem!"

== iSouth Remix ==
The official remix, "Birthday Sex (iSouth Remix)", features Pitbull, Trey Songz, Teairra Mari, Stat Quo, and Ludacris. The track was arranged by the record production duo iSouth Entertainment consisting of JB and Drunk D.

== Music video ==
Jeremih and Alessandra Cardoso in the music video "Birthday Sex".

The music video for "Birthday Sex" was filmed in Los Angeles, California, and was directed by Paul Hunter. In the video, Jeremih is shown with his love interest, Brazilian model Alessandra Cardoso with a Handycam to capture their intimate moments. He proceeds to feed her fruit and desserts while she is blindfolded.

The music video managed to appear at number 3 on BET's Notarized: Top 100 Videos of 2009 countdown.

== Critical reception ==
"Birthday Sex" has received generally favorable reviews from critics. Jon Caramanica of The New York Times called it a "fantastic single", while comparing it to songs by R. Kelly, as it "clips his lines short like a rapper and writes bedroom songs that verge on parody". Amos Barshad of New York magazine dubbed the song a "summer jam". According to Sean Ross of Edison Media Research, the title of the song generated its success.

== Chart performance ==
"Birthday Sex" debuted on the Billboard Hot R&B/Hip-Hop Songs chart at number 93 for the week of March 21, 2009. In May 2009, the song topped the Billboard Mainstream R&B/Hip-Hop chart after ascending from number five to number one, the greatest rise for a new artist since Tweet's "Oops (Oh My)" in 2002. "Birthday Sex" displaced Jamie Foxx's "Blame It" from its 12-week streak atop the chart. "Birthday Sex" also displaced "Blame It" from its 14-week reign atop the Hot R&B/Hip-Hop Songs chart. For the week of May 14, 2009, "Birthday Sex" became the first song in several years outside of the top 10 of the Billboard Hot 100 to simultaneously have the greatest airplay gain and digital download gain. The song peaked at number four on the Billboard Hot 100.

== Charts ==
=== Weekly charts ===
Chart (2009)	Peak position
Australia (ARIA)	37
Belgium (Ultratip Bubbling Under Flanders)	11
Belgium (Ultratip Bubbling Under Wallonia)	8
Canada Hot 100 (Billboard)	35
Denmark (Tracklisten)	21
European Hot 100 Singles (Billboard)	51
Euro Digital Song Sales (Billboard)	20
France (SNEP)	34
New Zealand (Recorded Music NZ)	33
UK Singles (Official Charts)	15
UK Hip Hop/R&B (Official Charts)	8
US Billboard Hot 100	4
US Hot R&B/Hip-Hop Songs (Billboard)	1
US Pop Airplay (Billboard)	14
US Rhythmic Airplay (Billboard)	1

=== Year-end charts ===
Charts (2009)	Position
UK Singles (Official Charts Company)	187
US Billboard Hot 100	37
US Hot R&B/Hip-Hop Songs (Billboard)	20
US Rhythmic (Billboard)	9

== Certifications ==
Region	Certification	Certified units/sales
Brazil (Pro-Música Brasil)	Platinum	60,000^{‡}
Denmark (IFPI Danmark)	Platinum	90,000^{‡}
Germany (BVMI)	Gold	150,000^{‡}
New Zealand (RMNZ)	3× Platinum	90,000^{‡}
United Kingdom (BPI)	Platinum	600,000^{‡}
United States (RIAA)	5× Platinum	5,000,000^{‡}
United States (RIAA) Mastertone	Platinum	1,000,000^{*}
^{*} Sales figures based on certification alone.^{‡} Sales+streaming figures based on certification alone.

== Release history ==
Release dates and formats for "Birthday Sex"
Region	Date	Format	Label(s)	Ref.
United States	May 11, 2009	Mainstream airplay	Def Jam	
