= Jeremih discography =

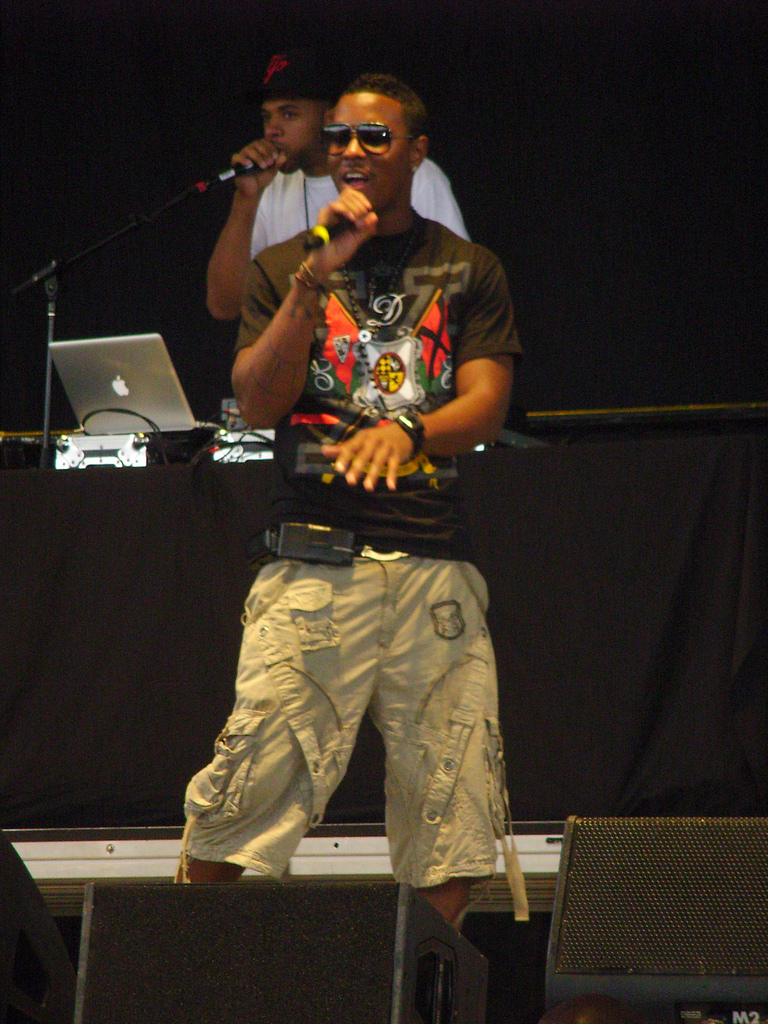
- Jeremih performing in 2009
- Studio albums: 3
- Extended plays: 2
- Singles: 48
- Music videos: 9
- Mixtapes: 4

American singer Jeremih has released three studio albums, one extended play (EPs), three mixtapes and forty-eight singles (including thirty-seven as a featured artist).

== Albums ==
=== Studio albums ===
List of studio albums, with selected chart positions
Title	Album details	Peak chart positions					Certifications
Title	Album details	US	US R&B/HH	FRA	NZ	UK	Certifications
Jeremih	Released: June 30, 2009; Label: Def Jam; Format: CD, digital download	6	1	100	—	95	RIAA: Platinum
All About You	Released: September 28, 2010; Label: Def Jam; Format: CD, digital download	27	8	—	—	—	RIAA: Platinum
Late Nights	Released: December 4, 2015; Label: Def Jam; Format: CD, digital download	42	9	—	— (Note: Late Nights did not enter the NZ Top 40 Albums Chart, but peaked at number nine on the NZ Heatseeker Albums Chart.)	—	RIAA: 2× Platinum; BPI: Gold
"—" denotes a recording that did not chart.

=== Collaborative albums ===
List of collaborative albums, with selected chart positions
Title	Album details	Peak chart positions	
Title	Album details	US	US R&B/HH
MihTy (with Ty Dolla Sign)	Released: October 26, 2018; Label: Def Jam, Atlantic; Format: Digital download	60	33

=== Mixtapes ===
List of mixtapes, with year released
Title	Album details
Late Nights with Jeremih	Released: August 7, 2012; Label: Self-released; Format: Digital download
N.O.M.A. (Not On My Album)	Released: August 4, 2014; Label: Self-released; Format: Digital download
Late Nights: Europe	Released: July 20, 2016; Label: Def Jam; Format: Digital download
Merry Christmas Lil' Mama (with Chance the Rapper)	Released: December 22, 2016; Label: Self-released; Format: Digital download

== Extended plays ==
List of extended plays, with year released
Title	Details
No More (with Shlohmo)	Released: July 18, 2014; Label: Wedidit, Def Jam; Format: CD, Digital download
Cinco De MihYo	Released: May 5, 2017; Label: Self-released; Format: Digital download
The Chocolate Box	Released: March 9, 2018; Label: Def Jam; Format: Digital download

== Singles ==
=== As lead artist ===
List of singles as lead artist, with selected chart positions and certifications, showing year released and album name
Title	Year	Peak chart positions										Certifications	Album
Title	Year	US	US R&B/HH	AUS	CAN	DEN	FRA	GER	NZ	SWI	UK	Certifications	Album
"Birthday Sex"	2009	4	1	37	35	21	34	—	33	—	15	RIAA: 5× Platinum; BPI: Platinum; BVMI: Gold; IFPI DEN: Gold; RMNZ: 3× Platinum	Jeremih
"Imma Star (Everywhere We Are)"	2009	51	23	—	—	—	—	—	—	—	—	RIAA: Platinum	Jeremih
"Break Up to Make Up"	2009	—	87	—	—	—	—	—	—	—	—		Jeremih
"I Like" (featuring Ludacris)	2010	— (Note: "I Like" did not enter the Billboard Hot 100, but peaked at number four on the Bubbling Under Hot 100 chart.)	25	—	—	—	—	—	—	—	—	RIAA: Gold	All About You
"Down on Me" (featuring 50 Cent)	2010	4	7	91	22	25	19	—	—	75	30	RIAA: 6× Platinum; BPI: Platinum; IFPI DEN: Gold; RMNZ: Platinum	All About You
"All the Time" (featuring Lil Wayne and Natasha Mosley)	2013	— (Note: "All the Time" did not enter the Billboard Hot 100, but peaked at number 24 on the Bubbling Under Hot 100 Singles chart.)	47	—	—	—	—	—	—	—	—	RIAA: 2× Platinum; BPI: Silver; RMNZ: Platinum	Late Nights with Jeremih
"Don't Tell 'Em" (featuring YG)	2014	6	2	14	30	21	43	57	—	70	5	RIAA: 5× Platinum; ARIA: Platinum; BPI: 2× Platinum; BVMI: Gold; IFPI DEN: Platinum; RMNZ: 3× Platinum	Late Nights
"Planez" (featuring J. Cole)	2015	44	16	—	—	—	—	—	—	—	—	RIAA: 5× Platinum; BPI: Gold; RMNZ: 2× Platinum	Late Nights
"Tonight Belongs to U!" (featuring Flo Rida)	2015	—	—	—	—	—	73	—	—	—	80		Non-album single
"Oui"	2015	19	5	—	92	—	—	—	—	—	—	RIAA: 5× Platinum; BPI: Gold; RMNZ: 4× Platinum	Late Nights
"Pass Dat"	2016	—	— (Note: "Pass Dat" did not enter the Hot R&B/Hip-Hop Songs chart, but peaked at number 49 on the R&B/Hip-Hop Airplay chart.)	—	—	—	—	—	—	—	—	RIAA: Gold	Late Nights
"London" (featuring Stefflon Don and Krept & Konan)	2016	—	—	—	—	—	—	—	—	—	—		Late Nights: Europe
"I Think of You" (featuring Chris Brown and Big Sean)	2017	—	— (Note: "I Think of You" did not enter the Hot R&B/Hip-Hop Songs chart, but peaked at number five on the Bubbling Under R&B/Hip-Hop Singles chart.)	—	—	—	—	—	— (Note: "I Think of You" did not enter the NZ Top 40 Singles Chart, but peaked at number four on the NZ Heatseeker Singles Chart.)	—	—		Non-album singles
"Physical" (with Mally Mall and E-40)	2017	—	—	—	—	—	—	—	—	—	—		Non-album singles
"What You Think" (with Zaytoven and Ty Dolla Sign featuring OJ da Juiceman)	2018	—	—	—	—	—	—	—	—	—	—		Trapholizay
"The Light" (with Ty Dolla Sign)	2018	—	— (Note: "The Light" did not enter the Hot R&B/Hip-Hop Songs chart, but peaked at number 27 on the R&B/Hip-Hop Airplay chart.)	—	—	—	—	—	— (Note: "The Light" did not enter the NZ Top 40 Singles Chart, but peaked at number 28 on the NZ Hot Singles Chart.)	—	—	RIAA: Gold; RMNZ: Gold	MihTy
"U 2 Luv" (with Ne-Yo)	2020	66	33	—	—	—	—	—	—	—	—	RMNZ: Gold	Self Explanatory
"Follow" (with Kito and Zhu)	2020	—	—	—	—	—	—	—	—	—	—		Non-album singles
"Lovelife" (with Benny Benassi)	2020	—	—	—	—	—	—	—	—	—	—		Non-album singles
"Are U Live" (with Chance the Rapper featuring Valee)	2020	—	—	—	—	—	—	—	—	—	—		Non-album singles
"Down Bad" (Hitmaka with Fabolous and Jeremih featuring Ivory Scott)	2022	—	—	—	—	—	—	—	—	—	—		Non-album singles
"Changes"	2022	—	— (Note: "Changes" did not enter the Hot R&B/Hip-Hop Songs chart, but peaked at number 25 on the R&B/Hip-Hop Airplay chart.)	—	—	—	—	—	—	—	—		Non-album singles
"Crew Thang" (with Dvbbs and Sk8)	2023	—	—	—	—	—	—	—	—	—	—		Non-album singles
"Room" (featuring Adekunle Gold and 2 Chainz)	2023	—	—	—	—	—	—	—	—	—	—		Non-album singles
"Wait on It" (featuring Bryson Tiller and Chris Brown)	2024	—	48	—	—	—	—	—	— (Note: "Wait on It" did not enter the NZ Top 40 Singles Chart, but peaked at number 4 on the NZ Hot Singles Chart.)	—	—		Non-album singles
"Sick" (featuring 4batz)	2024	—	— (Note: "Sick" did not enter the Hot R&B/Hip-Hop Songs chart, but peaked at number 25 on the Hot R&B Songs chart.)	—	—	—	—	—	—	—	—		Non-album singles
"—" denotes a recording that did not chart or was not released in that territory.

=== As featured artist ===
List of singles as featured artist, with selected chart positions and certifications, showing year released and album name
Title	Year	Peak chart positions										Certifications	Album
Title	Year	US	US R&B/HH	US Rap	AUS	CAN	DEN	FRA	IRL	NZ	UK	Certifications	Album
"My Time" (Fabolous featuring Jeremih)	2009	— (Note: "My Time" did not enter the Billboard Hot 100, but peaked at number eight on the Bubbling Under Hot 100 Singles chart.)	— (Note: "My Time" did not enter the Hot R&B/Hip-Hop Songs chart, but peaked at number two on the Bubbling Under R&B/Hip-Hop Singles chart.)	—	—	—	—	—	—	—	—	RIAA: Gold	Loso's Way
"Party After 2" (Sheek Louch featuring Jeremih)	2010	—	—	—	—	—	—	—	—	—	—		Donnie G: Don Gorilla
"I Don't Deserve You" (Lloyd Banks featuring Jeremih)	2011	— (Note: "I Don't Deserve You" did not enter the Billboard Hot 100, but peaked at number 20 on the Bubbling Under Hot 100 Singles chart.)	33	19	—	—	—	—	—	—	—		H.F.M. 2 (Hunger for More 2)
"That Way" (Wale featuring Jeremih and Rick Ross)	2011	49	4	5	—	—	—	—	—	—	—	RIAA: Gold	Self Made Vol. 1
"Just (The Tip)" (Plies featuring Jeremih and Ludacris)	2011	—	75	—	—	—	—	—	—	—	—		Purple Heart
"Do It Like You" (Diggy featuring Jeremih)	2011	80	11	11	—	—	—	—	—	—	—		Unexpected Arrival
"Ride Like That" (Travis Porter featuring Jeremih)	2012	—	63	—	—	—	—	—	—	—	—		From Day 1
"My Moment" (DJ Drama featuring Meek Mill, 2 Chainz and Jeremih)	2012	89	23	16	—	—	—	—	—	—	—		Quality Street Music
"All That (Lady)" (Game featuring Lil Wayne, Big Sean, Fabolous and Jeremih)	2012	—	48	—	—	—	—	—	—	—	—		Jesus Piece
"Crickets" (Drop City Yacht Club featuring Jeremih)	2013	— (Note: "Crickets" did not enter the Billboard Hot 100, but peaked at number two on the Bubbling Under Hot 100 Singles chart.)	36	25	—	—	—	—	—	—	—		Crickets - EP
"Nasty Girl" (Jim Jones featuring Jeremih and DJ Spinking)	2013	—	—	—	—	—	—	—	—	—	—		We Own the Night
"Party Girls" (Ludacris featuring Wiz Khalifa, Jeremih and Cashmere Cat)	2014	— (Note: "Party Girls" did not enter the Billboard Hot 100, but peaked at number 13 on the Bubbling Under Hot 100 Singles chart.)	36	20	—	—	—	—	—	—	—		Non-album single
"Hold You Down" (DJ Khaled featuring Chris Brown, August Alsina, Future and Jeremih)	2014	39	10	—	—	—	—	—	—	—	—	RIAA: Gold	I Changed a Lot
"Adult Swim" (DJ Spinking featuring Tyga, Velous and Jeremih)	2014	—	—	—	—	—	—	—	—	—	—		Non-album single
"The Body" (Wale featuring Jeremih)	2014	87	28	17	—	—	—	—	—	—	—	RIAA: Gold	The Album About Nothing
"Bad Bitch" (French Montana featuring Jeremih)	2014	95	29	21	—	—	—	—	—	—	—	RIAA: Gold	Non-album singles
"Somebody" (Natalie La Rose featuring Jeremih)	2015	10	5	—	12	22	34	71	28	34	2	RIAA: 2× Platinum; ARIA: Platinum; BPI: Platinum; IFPI DEN: Gold; RMNZ: Platinum	Non-album singles
"Get You Alone" (Maejor featuring Jeremih)	2015	—	—	—	—	—	—	—	—	—	—		Non-album singles
"My Jam" (Bobby Brackins featuring Zendaya and Jeremih)	2015	—	—	—	—	—	—	—	—	—	—		To Live For
"Like Me" (Lil Durk featuring Jeremih)	2015	— (Note: "Like Me" did not enter the Billboard Hot 100, but peaked at number nine on the Bubbling Under Hot 100 Singles chart.)	43	—	—	—	—	—	—	—	—		Remember My Name
"Making Me Proud" (Red Café featuring Jeremih and Rick Ross)	2015	—	—	—	—	—	—	—	—	—	—		ShakeDown
"Get Low" (50 Cent featuring Jeremih, T.I. and 2 Chainz)	2015	—	— (Note: "Get Low" did not enter the Hot R&B/Hip-Hop Songs chart, but peaked at number two on the Bubbling Under R&B/Hip-Hop Singles chart.)	—	—	—	—	—	—	—	—		Non-album single
"Freak of the Week" (Krept and Konan featuring Jeremih)	2015	—	—	—	—	—	—	—	94	—	9	BPI: Platinum	The Long Way Home
"The Fix" (Nelly featuring Jeremih)	2015	62	20	—	3	—	—	—	—	15	82	RIAA: Platinum; ARIA: 2× Platinum; BPI: Silver; RMNZ: 2× Platinum	Non-album single
"You Mine" (DJ Khaled featuring Trey Songz, Jeremih and Future)	2015	—	— (Note: "You Mine" did not enter the Hot R&B/Hip-Hop Songs chart, but peaked at number five on the Bubbling Under R&B/Hip-Hop Singles chart.)	—	—	—	—	—	—	—	—		I Changed a Lot
"Switch Up" (R. Kelly featuring Lil Wayne and Jeremih)	2015	—	—	—	—	—	—	—	—	—	—		The Buffet
"Somewhere in Paradise" (Chance the Rapper featuring Jeremih and R. Kelly)	2015	—	—	—	—	—	—	—	—	—	—		Non-album single
"Body" (Dreezy featuring Jeremih)	2016	62	24	—	—	—	—	—	—	—	—	RIAA: Platinum; RMNZ: Gold	No Hard Feelings
"What a Night" (Kat DeLuna featuring Jeremih)	2016	— (Note: "What a Night" has not entered the Billboard Hot 100, but has so far peaked at number 30 on the US Rhythmic songs chart.)	—	—	—	—	—	—	—	—	—	RMNZ: Gold	Loading
"Enemiez" (Keke Palmer featuring Jeremih)	2016	— (Note: "Enemiez" did not enter the Billboard Hot 100, but peaked at number 60 on the US Rhythmic songs chart.)	—	—	—	—	—	—	—	—	—		Non-album singles
"Summer Friends" (Chance the Rapper featuring Jeremih and Francis and the Lights)	2016	— (Note: "Summer Friends" did not enter the Billboard Hot 100, but peaked at number 18 on the Bubbling Under Hot 100 Singles chart.)	— (Note: "Summer Friends" did not enter the Hot R&B/Hip-Hop Songs chart, but peaked at number two on the Bubbling Under R&B/Hip-Hop Singles chart.)	—	—	—	—	—	—	—	—	RIAA: Platinum	Coloring Book
"Nasty" (Kid Ink featuring Jeremih and Spice)	2016	—	—	—	—	—	—	—	—	—	—		Non-album singls
"Saw It Coming" (G-Eazy featuring Jeremih)	2016	—	—	—	—	—	—	—	—	—	—		Ghostbusters (Original Motion Picture Soundtrack)
"Don't Hurt Me" (DJ Mustard featuring Nicki Minaj and Jeremih)	2016	—	— (Note: "Don't Hurt Me" did not enter the Hot R&B/Hip-Hop Songs chart, but peaked at number nine on the Bubbling Under R&B/Hip-Hop Singles chart.)	—	20	—	—	—	—	—	—	RIAA: Gold; ARIA: Gold; RMNZ: Gold	Cold Summer
"All Eyez" (The Game featuring Jeremih)	2016	79	30	21	—	—	—	—	—	—	—	RIAA: Gold; RMNZ: Gold	1992
"Point Seen Money Gone" (Snoop Dogg featuring Jeremih)	2016	—	—	—	—	—	—	—	—	—	—		Coolaid
"Like Dat" (PartyNextDoor featuring Jeremih and Lil Wayne)	2016	—	—	—	—	—	—	—	—	—	—		Non-album single
"If I Was Your Man" (Nick Cannon featuring Jeremih)	2016	—	—	—	—	—	—	—	—	—	—		The Gospel of the Ike Turn Up: My Side of the Story
"Do You Mind" (DJ Khaled featuring Nicki Minaj, Chris Brown, August Alsina, Jeremih, Future and Rick Ross)	2016	27	9	7	65	93	—	162	—	—	197	RIAA: 2× Platinum; ARIA: 2× Platinum	Major Key
"Next to You" (Twista featuring Jeremih)	2016	—	—	—	—	—	—	—	—	—	—	RMNZ: Platinum	Crook County
"Living Single" (Big Sean featuring Chance the Rapper and Jeremih)	2016	—	—	—	—	—	—	—	—	—	—	RIAA: Platinum; RMNZ: Gold	Non-album single
"The Half" (DJ Snake featuring Jeremih, Young Thug and Swizz Beatz)	2017	—	—	—	—	—	—	107	—	—	—	RMNZ: Gold	Encore
"Back for More" (Justine Skye featuring Jeremih)	2017	—	—	—	—	—	—	—	—	—	—		Ultraviolet
"9:15PM" (The Cool Kids featuring Jeremih)	2017	—	—	—	—	—	—	—	—	—	—		Special Edition Grand Master Deluxe
"Neither Do I" (Stwo featuring Jeremih)	2017	—	—	—	—	—	—	—	—	—	—		Non-album singles
"Womp Womp" (Valee featuring Jeremih)	2018	— (Note: "Womp Womp" did not enter the Billboard Hot 100, but peaked at number 24 on the Bubbling Under Hot 100 chart.)	—	—	—	98	—	—	—	—	—	RIAA: Gold	Non-album singles
"Dangerous" (Meek Mill featuring Jeremih and PnB Rock)	2018	31	14	13	—	—	—	—	—	—	—	RIAA: Platinum; RMNZ: Platinum	Legends of the Summer
"You Stay" (DJ Khaled featuring Meek Mill, J Balvin, Lil Baby and Jeremih)	2019	44	19	—	—	63	—	—	—	—	—	RIAA: Platinum	Father of Asahd
"On Chill" (Wale featuring Jeremih)	2019	22	13	11	—	—	—	—	—	—	—	RIAA: 2× Platinum; RMNZ: Platinum	Wow...That's Crazy
"Chase the Summer" (Chantel Jeffries featuring Jeremih)	2019	—	—	—	—	—	—	—	—	—	—		Non-album single
"Close Up" (Blueface featuring Jeremih)	2019	—	—	—	—	—	—	—	—	—	—		Find the Beat
"Choosy" (Fabolous featuring Jeremih and Davido)	2019	—	—	—	—	—	—	—	—	—	—		Summertime Shootout 3: Coldest Summer Ever
"Baby Girl" (Bryce Vine featuring Jeremih)	2020	—	—	—	—	—	—	—	—	—	—		Non-album singles
"Cloud 9" (Afrojack and Chico Rose featuring Jeremih)	2020	—	—	—	—	—	—	—	—	—	—		Non-album singles
"I Don't Wanna Leave" (PRETTYMUCH featuring Jeremih)	2021	—	—	—	—	—	—	—	—	—	—		Non-album singles
"X" (Tinashe featuring Jeremih)	2022	—	—	—	—	—	—	—	—	—	—		333
"Power Powder Respect" (50 Cent featuring Lil Durk and Jeremih)	2022	—	—	—	—	—	—	—	—	—	—		Non-album single
"Freak It" (Joe Moses featuring Jeremih)	2022	—	—	—	—	—	—	—	—	—	—		From Nothing 2 Something 4
"LaDaDa" (Juneyear featuring Jeremih)	2023	—	—	—	—	—	—	—	—	—	—		Non-album singles
"Anti Social" (Juneyear featuring Jeremih and Young Jonn)	2023	—	—	—	—	—	—	—	—	—	—		Non-album singles
"Murfy's Law" (Murf Dilly and BlakeIANA featuring Jeremih)	2023	—	—	—	—	—	—	—	—	—	—		Non-album singles
"Act Different (v2)" (Murf Dilly featuring Jeremih and BlakeIANA)	2023	—	—	—	—	—	—	—	—	—	—		Non-album singles
"War" (Camper featuring Ari Lennox and Jeremih)	2024	—	—	—	—	—	—	—	—	—	—		Non-album singles
"No One Else" (Lola Brooke featuring Jeremih)	2024	—	—	—	—	—	—	—	—	—	—		Non-album singles
"Ain't My Fault" (Z Money featuring Jeremih)	2024	—	—	—	—	—	—	—	—	—	—		Non-album singles
"Don't Tell Nobody" (Tink featuring Jeremih)	2024	—	—	—	—	—	—	—	—	—	—		Non-album singles
"Birthday Sex" (Levi featuring Jeremih)	2025	—	—	—	—	—	—	—	—	—	—		Non-album singles
"icandy" (Rahtwofive featuring Jeremih)	2025	—	—	—	—	—	—	—	—	—	—		Non-album singles
"Make U Rain" (Sukihana featuring Jeremih)	2025	—	—	—	—	—	—	—	—	—	—		Non-album singles
"Streetlights" (JasonMartin featuring Jeremih)	2026	—	—	—	—	—	—	—	—	—	—		Non-album singles
"All That A$$" (Keith Turner, Ty Dolla Sign, Coi Leray and KDDO featuring Jeremih)	2026	—	—	—	—	—	—	—	—	—	—		Non-album singles
"Lottery 4.0" (Shaggy featuring Jeremih, Rick Ross and Skillibeng)	2026	—	—	—	—	—	—	—	—	—	—		Non-album singles
"Do Too Much" (King Combs featuring Jeremih)	2026	—	—	—	—	—	—	—	—	—	—		Non-album singles
"Shroom Clouds" (ASAP Rocky featuring Reggie and Jeremih)	2026	—	42	—	—	—	—	—	—	— (Note: "Shroom Clouds" did not enter the NZ Top 40 Singles Chart, but peaked at number 27 on the NZ Hot Singles Chart.)	—		Dumb and Dumber (Disc 2)
"Lottery" (Shaggy featuring Jeremih)	2026	—	—	—	—	—	—	—	—	—	—		Lottery
"—" denotes a recording that did not chart or was not released in that territory.

== Other charted and certified songs ==
List of other charted songs, with selected chart positions, showing year released and album name
Title	Year	Peak chart positions							Certifications	Album
Title	Year	US	US R&B/HH	CAN	FRA	SWE	SWI	UK	Certifications	Album
"Shawty" (Moonie featuring Jeremih)	2009	—	— (Note: "Shawty" did not enter the Hot R&B/Hip-Hop Songs chart, but peaked at number 16 on the Bubbling Under R&B/Hip-Hop Singles chart.)	—	—	—	—	—		Non-album single
"All About You"	2010	—	—	—	—	—	—	—	RIAA: Gold	All About You
"Love Don't Change"	2010	—	—	—	—	—	—	—	RIAA: 2× Platinum; RMNZ: Gold	All About You
"Favorite" (Nicki Minaj featuring Jeremih)	2014	—	44	—	—	—	—	—		The Pinkprint
"All Set" (Booba featuring Jeremih)	2015	—	—	—	163	—	—	—		D.U.C
"Classic" (Meek Mill featuring Swizz Beatz and Jeremih)	2015	—	— (Note: "Classic" did not enter the Hot R&B/Hip-Hop Songs chart, but peaked at number one on the Bubbling Under R&B/Hip-Hop Singles chart.)	—	—	—	—	—		Dreams Worth More Than Money
"Impatient" (featuring Ty Dolla Sign)	2015	—	—	—	—	—	—	—	RIAA: 2× Platinum; BPI: Silver; RMNZ: 3× Platinum	Late Nights
"Remember Me"	2015	—	—	—	—	—	—	—	RIAA: Gold	Late Nights
"Paradise"	2015	—	— (Note: "Paradise" did not enter the Hot R&B/Hip-Hop Songs chart, but peaked at number four on the Bubbling Under R&B/Hip-Hop Singles chart.)	—	—	—	—	—		Late Nights
"Woosah" (featuring Juicy J and Twista)	2015	—	—	—	—	—	—	—	RIAA: Gold	Late Nights
"Light" (Big Sean featuring Jeremih)	2017	97	39	—	—	—	—	—		I Decided
"Don't Quit" (DJ Khaled and Calvin Harris featuring Travis Scott and Jeremih)	2017	68	30	50	146	71	76	75		Grateful
"Thankful" (DJ Khaled featuring Lil Wayne and Jeremih)	2021	100	46	—	—	—	—	—		Khaled Khaled
"Stop Playin" (Lil Baby featuring Jeremih)	2022	81	38	—	—	—	—	—		It's Only Me
"—" denotes a recording that did not chart or was not released in that territory.

== Guest appearances ==
List of non-single guest appearances, with other performing artists, showing year released and album name
Title	Year	Other artist(s)	Album
"Love Somebody"	2009	Ace Hood	Ruthless
"I Don't Deserve You"	2010	Lloyd Banks	H.F.M. 2 (The Hunger for More 2)
"I Get Lonely Too"	2011	Drake	none
"Planet 50"	2012	50 Cent	The Lost Tape
"Girls Go Wild"	2012	50 Cent	none
"Too Sexy"	2012	Gucci Mane	I'm Up
"One Life to Live"	2012	CashFlow	The Enterprise
"One Life to Live"	2012	Fred the Godson	Gordo Frederico
"Instagram Ya' Body"	2012	Willie Taylor	The Reintroduction of Willie Taylor
"Misunderstood"	2012	R. Kelly	none
"Do It" (Remix)	2012	Mykko Montana, Gucci Mane, Nelly, Yo Gotti, Travis Porter, Nitti Beatz	Scorpio Season
"Bout My Money"	2012	E-40, Too $hort, Turf Talk	History: Function Music
"Married"	2012	Red Café	American Psycho
"R.N.F."	2012	Chip, T.I.	London Boy
"Body Operator" (Remix)	2013	DJ Spinking, French Montana	none
"Nothing To Me"	2013	Juelz Santana	God Will'n
"Err Damn Day"	2013	Travis Porter	Mr. Porter
"Sound of Love"	2013	Cassie	RockaByeBaby
"Only Bad Ones"	2013	N.O.R.E.	Student of the Game
"Bump That Bass"	2013	Funkmaster Flex	Who You Mad At? Me or Yourself?
"Ballin' Out"	2013	French Montana, Diddy	Excuse My French
"Moriagaro"	2013	Ai	Moriagaro
"Twerk It" (Remix)	2013	Busta Rhymes, Vybz Kartel, Ne-Yo, T.I., French Montana	none
"Take That Off"	2013	DJ Khaled, Vado	Suffering from Success
"Thim Slick"	2013	Fabolous	The S.O.U.L. Tape 3
"All We Know"	2014	French Montana, Chinx Drugz	Coke Boys 4
"I'm Rich"	2014	Red Café, French Montana, Ace Hood	American Psycho II
"Me Too"	2014	King Los, Kid Ink	Zero Gravity II
"My Bae"	2014	Vado	none
"Show Me"	2014	Omarion	Sex Playlist
"Made Me" (Remix)	2014	Snootie Wild, Lil Boosie	none
"Don't Panic" (Remix)	2014	French Montana, Chris Brown	none
"Blessing" (Remix)	2014	K Camp	none
"Want Some More"	2014	Nicki Minaj	The Pinkprint
"Don't Tell Nobody"	2014	Tink	none
"Pretty Gang 2"	2015	Red Cafe, Tank, Fabolous	In Us We Trust 2
"Bad Bitch" (Remix)	2015	French Montana, Rick Ross, Fabolous	Casino Life 2: Brown Bag Legend
"Like Me"	2015	Lil Durk	Remember My Name
"All Set"	2015	Booba	D.U.C
"Wanna Be Cool"	2015	Chance the Rapper, Big Sean, KYLE	Surf
"Classic"	2015	Meek Mill, Swizz Beatz	Dreams Worth More Than Money
"Main"	2015	Meek Mill	Dreams Worth More Than Money
"Angel"	2015	DJ Prostyle, Nicki Minaj	none
"All I Want"	2015	Verse Simmonds	Fuck Your Feelings 3
"Late Night King"	2015	Trae tha Truth, Ty Dolla Sign, T.I.	Tha Truth
"2nite"	2015	Dr. Dre, Kendrick Lamar	none
"Thug Love"	2015	Chinx	Welcome to JFK
"Change"	2015	K Camp	Only Way Is Up
"Fuck"	2016	Post Malone	August 26
"Too Lit"	2016	Kid Ink	RSS2
"Tipo Crazy"	2016	Ludmilla	A Danada Sou Eu
"On & On"	2017	Uncle Murda, 50 Cent	Lenny Grant Story
"Don't Quit"	2017	DJ Khaled, Calvin Harris, Travis Scott	Grateful
"Takes Two"	2017	K. Michelle	Kimberly: The People I Used to Know
"Anything U Want"	2017	Sevyn Streeter, Ty Dolla $ign, Wiz Khalifa	Girl Disrupted
"Ol Skool"	2017	Sevyn Streeter, Dej Loaf	Girl Disrupted
"Dawsin's Breek"	2017	Ty Dolla $ign	Beach House 3
"Chillin'"	2018	Roscoe Dash	5thy5ive
"Last Call"	2019	J. Stone, Snoop Dogg	The Definition of Loyalty
"All That"	2019	Drama Relax	13 Reasons Why: Season 3
"Hands Off"	2019	Gucci Mane	Delusions of Grandeur
"Secret"	2019	Burna Boy, Serani	African Giant
"Hands on You"	2019	Fat Joe, Bryson Tiller	Family Ties
"Drive"	2019	Fat Joe, Ty Dolla $ign	Family Ties
"Bad Lil Vibe"	2020	KSI	Dissimulation
"Thankful"	2021	DJ Khaled, Lil Wayne	Khaled Khaled
"Stop Playin"	2022	Lil Baby	It's Only Me
"Boohoo"	2023	Diddy	The Love Album: Off the Grid

== Production discography ==
List of production and non-performing songwriting credits for other artists (excluding guest appearances, interpolations and samples)
Title	Year	Credit	Artist	Album
"Tumblin' Down"	2010	Songwriter, background vocals	Jenna Andrews	Non-album single
7. "Amen"; (featuring Drake)	2012	Additional vocals, songwriter	Meek Mill	Dreams & Nightmares
7. "I Love It"; (featuring Fabolous)	2013	Songwriter	Cassie Ventura	RockaByeBaby
11. "Do My Dance"; (featuring Too Short)	2013	Songwriter	Cassie Ventura	RockaByeBaby
13. "All My Love"	2013	Songwriter	Cassie Ventura	RockaByeBaby
5. "My Darlin'"; (featuring Future)	2013	Songwriter	Miley Cyrus	Bangerz
4. "Rice Rain"	2014	Songwriter	Cashmere Cat	Wedding Bells
3. "Show Me" (featuring Chris Brown)	2014	Songwriter	Kid Ink	My Own Lane
6. "Main Chick" (featuring Chris Brown)	2014	Songwriter	Kid Ink	My Own Lane
8. "Throw Sum Mo"; (featuring Nicki Minaj and Young Thug)	2014	Songwriter	Rae Sremmurd	SremmLife
12. "Adore"; (featuring Ariana Grande)	2015	Songwriter	Cashmere Cat	9
6. "Woo"	2016	Songwriter	Rihanna	Anti
3. "Ain't You"	2016	Songwriter	K. Michelle	More Issues Than Vogue
3. "Bounce Back"	2017	Additional vocals, songwriter	Big Sean	I Decided
6. "Vault"	2017	Songwriter	Keyshia Cole	11:11 Reset
2. "Unforgettable"; (featuring Swae Lee)	2017	Uncredited composer, miscellaneous	French Montana	Jungle Rules
18. "White Dress"	2017	Songwriter	French Montana	Jungle Rules
12. "No Contest"	2018	Songwriter	Tinashe	Joyride
2. "1942"; (featuring Yo Gotti and YBN Nahmir)	2018	Songwriter	G-Eazy	Uncle Drew soundtrack
3. "All Mine"	2018	Songwriter	Kanye West	Ye
4. "Wouldn't Leave"; (featuring PartyNextDoor)	2018	Additional vocals, songwriter	Kanye West	Ye
6. "Kitten"; (featuring Lil Wayne)	2019	Songwriter	Kash Doll	Stacked
3. "Gotta Move On"; (featuring H.E.R.)	2020	Songwriter	Toni Braxton	Spell My Name
15. "Goyard Bags"; (featuring THEY.)	2022	Songwriter	Wiz Khalifa	Multiverse
1. "Intro"	2023	Songwriter	Lady London	S.O.U.L.
7. "Make Me Better"	2023	Songwriter	Larissa Lambert	I Love You and It's Getting Worse
12. "Past Those Interlude"	2024	Songwriter	Tink	Winter's Diary 5
13. "Jealous"	2024	Songwriter	Tink	Winter's Diary 5
4. "Go Girl"; (with Latto and Doja Cat)	2025	Songwriter	Summer Walker	Finally Over It
9. "Give Me a Reason"; (with Bryson Tiller)	2025	Producer (with Nineteen85 and Malay)	Summer Walker	Finally Over It
4. "SAD PARTY"	2025	Songwriter	Bia	BIANCA

== Music videos ==
=== As lead artist ===
List of music videos
Title	Year	Director(s)
"Birthday Sex"	2009	Paul Hunter
"Imma Star (Everywhere We Are)"	2009	Marc Klasfeld
"Break Up to Make Up"	2009	Taj
"Raindrops"	2009	Ghettonerd
"I Like"	2010	Ray Kay
"Down on Me"	2010	Colin Tilley
"Karate Chop" (Remix)	2013	A Zae Production
"Don't Tell 'Em" (Remix) (featuring Ty Dolla Sign and French Montana)	2015	Eif Rivera
"London" (featuring Stefflon Don and Krept & Konan)	2016	Jeremih
"I Think of You" (featuring Chris Brown and Big Sean)	2017	Daniel Cz

=== As featured artist ===
List of music videos
Title	Year	Director(s)
"Party After 2" (Sheek Louch featuring Jeremih)	2010	James Del Gatto
"I Don't Deserve You" (Lloyd Banks featuring Jeremih)	2011	Parris
"That Way" (Wale featuring Jeremih and Rick Ross)	2011	Dayo
"Do It Like You" (Diggy featuring Jeremih)	2011	Phil the God a.k.a. PHIL
"Bout My Money" (E-40 and Too Short featuring Jeremih and Turf Talk)	2013	Ben Griffin
"Somebody" (Natalie La Rose featuring Jeremih)	2015	Lukas Gilford
"Freak of The Week" (Krept & Konan featuring Jeremih)	2015	Carly Cussen
"Enemiez" (Keke Palmer featuring Jeremih)	2016	Carly Cussen
"What a Night" (Kat DeLuna featuring Jeremih)	2016	Tyrone Edmond
"Back For More" (Justine Skye featuring Jeremih)	2017	Grizz Lee
"I'm A Fan" (Pia Mia featuring Jeremih)	2017	Unknown
