= Tonight Belongs to U! =

Single by Jeremih featuring Flo Rida
- Released: April 21, 2015
- Recorded: 2014
- Genre: EDM; R&B
- Length: 3:16
- Label: Def Jam
- Songwriters: Jeremih Felton; Tramar Dillard; Mick Schultz
- Producer: Mick Schultz

Jeremih singles chronology
"Planez" (2015)	"Tonight Belongs to U!" (2015)	"Freak of the Week" (2015)

"Tonight Belongs to U!" is a song by American singer Jeremih. It features American rapper Flo Rida, and was released as a standalone single prior to his third studio album Late Nights. The track premiered on April 6, 2015.

== Remixes ==
On June 4, 2015, Dutch DJ Afrojack released a remix of the track.

== Performances ==
Jeremih performed the song with Flo Rida on The Tonight Show Starring Jimmy Fallon July 22, 2015.

== Charts ==
=== Weekly charts ===
Chart (2015)	Peak position
France (SNEP)	73
UK Singles (Official Charts)	80
US Dance Club Songs (Billboard)	24
US Hot Dance/Electronic Songs (Billboard)	14
US Pop Airplay (Billboard)	34
US Rhythmic Airplay (Billboard)	30

=== Year-end charts ===
Chart (2015)	Position
US Hot Dance/Electronic Songs (Billboard)	42
