= Wake Up Everybody =

Wake Up Everybody may refer to:

- Wake Up Everybody (Harold Melvin & the Blue Notes album)
- "Wake Up Everybody" (Harold Melvin & the Blue Notes song)
- Wake Up Everybody (2004 album), a compilation album released to coincide with the U.S. 2004 presidential election
- "Wake Up Everybody" (R. Kelly song)
