= Marching band (disambiguation) =

A marching band is a sport consisting of instrumental musicians performing outdoors.

Marching band may also refer to:

- "Marching Band" (Asian Kung-Fu Generation song), 2011
- "Marching Band" (R. Kelly song), 2015
- Marching Band (duo), Musical duo from Sweden
