= The Long Way Home (Krept and Konan album) =

Studio album by Krept and Konan
- Released: 3 July 2015
- Genre: British hip hop; R&B
- Length: 67:53
- Label: Play Dirty; Virgin EMI; Def Jam
- Producer: ADP (exec.); Adotskitz; EY Beats; Crumz; DJ Mustard; Levi Lennox; P2J; Ragz Originale

Krept and Konan chronology
Young Kingz (2013)	The Long Way Home (2015)	Revenge Is Sweet (2019)

Singles from The Long Way Home
- 1. "Freak of the Week" Released: 28 June 2015

The Long Way Home is the debut studio album by British hip hop duo Krept and Konan. Originally scheduled for release on 6 July 2015, the album was released a day early on 5 July 2015 by Play Dirty, Virgin EMI and Def Jam. The album features guest appearances from British singers Emeli Sandé, Rebecca Garton and Ed Sheeran, American singer Jeremih, American rappers Rick Ross, YG and Wiz Khalifa, British rapper Skepta and Derrick Morgan. The title, artwork and release date was published on 23 March 2015 via Twitter.

The lead single "Freak of the Week" featuring Jeremih became a top ten hit and also became Krept and Konan's first top 40 entry. The Long Way Home received positive reviews from critics and entered the UK Albums Chart at number 2 while topping the UK R&B Chart.

== Singles ==
"Certified" featuring American rapper Rick Ross was released as a promotional single on 27 March 2015, along with a lyrics video.

The first official single "Freak of the Week" featuring Jeremih was released on 28 June 2015 and entered the UK Singles Chart at number 9, becoming Krept and Konan's first top 40 entry and highest-charting single, as well as becoming Jeremih's second highest-charting single in the UK after "Don't Tell 'Em" featuring YG.

== Chart performance ==
The Long Way Home debuted at number 2 on the UK Albums Chart on 10 July 2015, beaten only by Ed Sheeran's x. The album entered at number 1 on the UK R&B Chart and UK Digital Chart. The Long Way Home is Krept and Konan's highest-charting project, surpassing the performance of the mixtape Young Kingz (2013) which peaked at number 19.

== Track listing ==
The Long Way Home — Standard edition
No.	Title	Producer(s)	Length
1.	"The Long Way Home" (featuring Derrick Morgan)	ADP; Adotskitz	7:39
2.	"Last Night" (featuring YG)	ADP; Levi Lennox	4:14
3.	"Fell Apart (Interlude)" (featuring Konan's Mum)	Konan's Mum	0:46
4.	"Fell Apart / Lucky Ones"	ADP; Levi Lennox; Crumz	5:04
5.	"Drifting Away"	Mokeyzz	3:31
6.	"Do It for the Gang" (featuring Wiz Khalifa)	ADP	4:31
7.	"I Don't Know" (featuring Rebecca Garton)	P2J; Crumz	4:45
8.	"Certified" (featuring Rick Ross)	ADP; Levi Lennox	4:19
9.	"Because of You"	EY Beats; ADP	3:44
10.	"Think About It"	Levi Lennox	4:04
11.	"Freak of the Week" (featuring Jeremih)	DJ Mustard; ADP	3:45
12.	"Wait Up for Me (Interlude)"	Ragz Originale	0:46
13.	"Wait Up for Me / Waiting"	ADP; Levi Lennox	5.07
14.	"F.W.T.S / Active" (featuring Skepta)	ADP	4:31
15.	"Dreams" (featuring Ed Sheeran)	EY Beats; ADP	5:01
16.	"Roses" (featuring Emeli Sandé)	Levi Lennox	4:21
Total length:			67:53

The Long Way Home — Deluxe edition (bonus tracks)
No.	Title	Producer(s)	Length
17.	"So Easy"	Big Mike; P2J	3:04
18.	"Falling"	Levi Lennox	4:40
19.	"Messages"	Naughty Boy; Shakaveli	10:09
Total length:			85:46

== Charts ==
Chart (2015)	Peak position
UK Albums (OCC)	2
UK Album Downloads (OCC)	1
UK R&B Albums (OCC)	1

== Certifications ==
Region	Certification	Certified units/sales
United Kingdom (BPI)	Silver	60,000^{‡}
^{‡} Sales+streaming figures based on certification alone.

== Release history ==
Region	Date	Format	Label
Ireland	3 July 2015	CD; digital download	Virgin EMI
United Kingdom	5 July 2015	CD; digital download	Virgin EMI
