= Young Kingz =

Mixtape by Krept and Konan
- Released: 2 September 2013
- Recorded: 2011–13
- Genre: British hip hop
- Length: 67:53
- Label: Play Dirty, Def Jam, Virgin EMI
- Producer: ADP (exec.); AdotSkitz; Maestro; Scholar & Stix; Steel Banglez; Rymez; E.Y.; Reaper On Beatz

Krept and Konan chronology
Tsunami (2010)	Young Kingz (2013)	The Long Way Home (2015)

Singles from Young Kingz
- 1. "Don't Waste My Time" Released: 21 March 2014

Young Kingz is the third mixtape by the British hip hop duo Krept and Konan. The mixtape was released on 2 September 2013 on Play Dirty. It entered the UK Albums Chart at number 19 and the UK R&B Chart at number three. The mixtape's sequel, Young Kingz II, was released on February 7, 2025.

== Background and release ==
ADP of London Boy Entertainment was the executive producer. Production also included Maestro, Scholar & Stix, Steel Banglez, Adot, Rymez, EY. The mixtape featured rappers such as Fekky, Tinie Tempah, Giggs, Chip, Yungen, and G FrSH, and was accompanied by spoken word artist George the Poet and singer Yana Toma. The first visual from the project was "My Story" published via YouTube on 4 August 2013. It received 550,000 YouTube hits in less than 24 hours. The record explains Konan’s loss of his stepfather and the duo’s reason of why they pursued their music career in a poetic storytelling type of rap. "Don’t Waste My Time" was the second visual released also published on YouTube directed by Javier. The video was based in their hometown. The mixtape entered the Official UK Albums Chart update at number 10 on 4 September 2013, slipping to number 19 by the end of the week. The duo won the Best Newcomer in the MOBO Awards 2013. On 23 October 2013, they successfully signed a record deal with Virgin EMI. The official remix of "Don't Waste My Time" premiered in January 2014 and features American rappers French Montana, Chinx Drugz, Lil Durk and British rappers Wretch 32, Fekky and Chip. A version featuring only the American rappers appears on Montana's Coke Boys 4 mixtape. "Don't Waste My Time" rose to fame in the UK rap scene in January 2014, with other notable artists such as Stormzy, G FrSH, MNEK, Jacob Banks and Dot Rotten all contributing to unofficial remixes of the track. The song was released as a single in March 2014, and entered the UK Singles Chart at number 154.

== Track listing ==
No.	Title	Producer(s)	Length
1.	"Young Kingz, Pt. 1" (featuring George the Poet)	ADP	1:54
2.	"My Story"	AdotSkitz	4:43
3.	"Other Side" (featuring Ari)	Maestro	4:01
4.	"Too Young" (featuring Yungen)	ADP	3:39
5.	"Young n’ Reckless" (featuring Chip)	ADP	3:45
6.	"Don’t Waste My Time"	AdotSkitz	3:25
7.	"M.D.M.A" (featuring G FrSH)	ADP	3:39
8.	"We In Here"	ADP	3:10
9.	"Number 13" (featuring Yana Toma)	Scholar & Stix	3:07
10.	"My Name" (featuring Yana Toma)	Steel Banglez	4:14
11.	"Dancing On the Table"	Rymez	3:27
12.	"Lord Forgive Me" (Interlude)	ADP	0:31
13.	"Lord Forgive Me" (featuring Tinie Tempah)	ADP	4:59
14.	"Bloodclart" (featuring Giggs)	ADP	5:23
15.	"Green Street" (featuring Fekky)	ADP	4:31
16.	"Nightmares" (featuring Siah)	E.Y.	4:14
17.	"Brothers" (featuring Anthony Thomas)	Adotskitz	4:00
18.	"All Eyes On Me"	Reaper On Beatz	3:43
19.	"Young Kingz, Pt. 2" (featuring George the Poet)	ADP	1:28
Total length:			67:53

=== Live show ===
Date	City	Region	Venue
9 October 2013	London	United Kingdom	O2 Academy Islington
28 December 2013	London	United Kingdom	O2 Academy Islington

== Charts ==
Chart (2013)	Peak position
UK Albums (OCC)	19
UK Album Downloads (OCC)	8
UK Independent Albums (OCC)	3
UK R&B Albums (OCC)	3
