= The Fix (song) =

Single by Nelly featuring Jeremih
- Released: August 14, 2015
- Recorded: 2015
- Genre: Hip hop; R&B
- Length: 2:53
- Label: Records; Sony
- Songwriters: Cornell Haynes, Jr.; Jeremih Felton; Dijon McFarlane; Mikely Adam; Ceresia Blanchard; Devon Bell; Kaleb Rollins; Marvin Gaye; Odell Brown; David Ritz
- Producers: DJ Mustard; Mike Free

Nelly singles chronology
"Get like Me" (2013)	"The Fix" (2015)	"I Don't Wanna Go to Bed" (2015)

Jeremih singles chronology
"Freak of the Week" (2015)	"The Fix" (2015)	"Oui" (2015)

"The Fix" is a song by American rapper Nelly featuring American singer Jeremih. The track is produced by DJ Mustard and Mike Free and interpolates Marvin Gaye's 1982 hit song "Sexual Healing". The song came to fruition as a result of Nelly and DJ Mustard having the same publisher, who made sure all references to the interpolation contained within "The Fix" were cleared before it was released.

== Background ==
The song premiered on August 6, 2015, and was released for digital download on August 14.

== Commercial performance ==
"The Fix" debuted on the Billboard Hot 100 chart dated September 5, 2015, at number 86. Its chart debut was fueled by first-week digital download sales of 42,000 copies. As of June 2016, "The Fix" has been certified Platinum from RIAA for selling 1,000,000 copies domestically.

== Music video ==
The accompanying music video for the track was directed by Aristotle and filmed at the Sheats Goldstein Residence in Beverly Crest, Los Angeles, California. It was released on September 24, 2015. For reasons unknown, the video was deleted from YouTube in 2019, although unofficial re-uploads are still accessible.

== Track listing ==
Digital download

1. "The Fix" (featuring Jeremih; explicit) – 2:53
2. "The Fix" (featuring Jeremih; clean) – 2:53

== Charts ==
=== Weekly charts ===
Weekly chart performance for "The Fix"
Chart (2015–2016)	Peak position
Australia (ARIA)	3
Canada Hot 100 (Billboard)	88
Belgium (Ultratip Bubbling Under Flanders)	46
Belgium (Ultratip Bubbling Under Wallonia)	48
New Zealand (Recorded Music NZ)	15
Scottish Singles Sales (Official Charts)	64
UK Singles (Official Charts)	82
UK Hip Hop/R&B (Official Charts)	16
US Billboard Hot 100	62
US Hot R&B/Hip-Hop Songs (Billboard)	20
US Pop Airplay (Billboard)	30
US Rhythmic Airplay (Billboard)	6

=== Year-end charts ===
2015 year-end chart performance for "The Fix"
Chart (2015)	Position
Australia (ARIA)	61
Australia Urban (ARIA)	12

2016 year-end chart performance for "The Fix"
Chart (2016)	Position
US Hot R&B/Hip-Hop Songs (Billboard)	92

== Certifications ==
Certifications for "The Fix"
Region	Certification	Certified units/sales
Australia (ARIA)	2× Platinum	140,000^{‡}
New Zealand (RMNZ)	2× Platinum	60,000^{‡}
United Kingdom (BPI)	Silver	200,000^{‡}
United States (RIAA)	Platinum	514,000
^{‡} Sales+streaming figures based on certification alone.

== Release history ==
Release history and formats for "The Fix"
Country	Date	Format	Label	Ref.
United States	August 14, 2015	Digital download	Records	
United States	August 18, 2015	Rhythmic contemporary radio	Records	
