= Backyard Party =

Single by R. Kelly

from the album The Buffet
- Released: August 21, 2015
- Recorded: 2015
- Genre: R&B; disco
- Length: 3:31
- Label: RCA
- Songwriter: R. Kelly
- Producer: R. Kelly

R. Kelly singles chronology
"Dolo" (2015)	"Backyard Party" (2015)	"Switch Up" (2015)

"Backyard Party" is a song by American R&B singer R. Kelly. It was released on August 21, 2015, as the lead single of his thirteenth studio album The Buffet.

== Music video ==
The official audio for the single was uploaded to VEVO August 21, 2015. Rolling Stone also talked about it on their magazine too. The music video features cameo appearances from Chance the Rapper and Snoop Dogg. It shows R. Kelly singing along with his "friends" wearing family reunion shirts. It also shows them riding self-balancing scooters. Once the song ends in the music video the sound comes on and you can hear people actually singing his Backyard Party song. Then after, the song changes to another one of his songs on his album The Buffet called Marching Band. Backyard Party is a groovy funk, song that has an upbeat tempo to it. This song has the same type of feel as his previous song Step in the Name of Love, but it sounds more like the remix than the original.

== Remixes ==
On December 6, 2015, the first official remix of the song was released titled Christmas Party. This was released on SoundCloud.

== Live performance ==
R. Kelly performed this song for the first time on Soul Train Awards 2015. and then later on The Tonight Show with Jimmy Fallon. R. Kelly also performed a part of the song on Good Morning America. He also sang one of his most famous hits Ignition (Remix).

== Critical reception ==
"Backyard Party" has received positive ratings from critics and fans alike. It reached 27th on the U.S. R&B/Hip-Hop charts.

== Charts ==
Chart (2015–16)	Peak position
US Adult R&B Songs (Billboard)	6
US R&B/Hip-Hop Airplay (Billboard)	27
