= Switch Up (R. Kelly song) =

Single by R. Kelly featuring Lil Wayne and Jeremih

from the album The Buffet
- Released: November 6, 2015
- Recorded: 2015
- Genre: R&B; hip hop
- Length: 3:23
- Label: RCA
- Songwriters: R. Kelly; Jordan Holt; Cem Tomak; Dwayne Carter, Jr.; Jeremih Felton; Matthew Coleman; Lisa Antwil; Richard Maclean; Brittany Hazzard
- Producers: Kelly; Cem T.; J Holt

R. Kelly singles chronology
"Backyard Party" (2015)	"Switch Up" (2015)	"Somewhere in Paradise" (2015)

Lil Wayne singles chronology
"Bottom of the Bottle" (2015)	"Switch Up" (2015)	"Order More" (2016)

Jeremih singles chronology
"Oui" (2015)	"Switch Up" (2015)	"Somewhere in Paradise" (2015)

"Switch Up" is a song by American R&B singer R. Kelly. It was released on August 21, 2015 as the second single of his thirteenth studio album, The Buffet. The single features guest appearances by American rapper Lil Wayne, and singer Jeremih.

== Track listing ==
- Download digital
1. Switch Up (Explicit) (featuring Lil Wayne and Jeremih) — 3:23

== Charts ==
=== Weekly charts ===
Chart (2015)	Peak position
US R&B/Hip-Hop Digital Songs (Billboard)	46
