= Krept and Konan =

British hip hop duo

- Origin: South London, England
- Genres: British hip hop; Road Rap; Dancehall; Trap
- Occupations: Rappers; songwriters
- Years active: 2009–Present
- Labels: Play Dirty; Virgin EMI; Def Jam
- Members: Krept (Casyo Valentine Johnson); Konan (Karl Dominic Wilson)

Krept and Konan is a British hip hop duo from London, consisting of Casyo Valentine "Krept" Johnson BEM (born 4 February 1990, Gipsy Hill) and Karl Dominic "Konan" Wilson BEM (born 3 September 1989, Thornton Heath), the son of Delroy Wilson otherwise known as 'Jamaica's first child star'. Their first major release was the mixtape Young Kingz, released on 2 September 2013. As of 3 May 2013, Krept and Konan signed a record deal with Virgin EMI Records.

Their debut album The Long Way Home was released on 5 July 2015 and entered the UK Albums Chart at number 2. The duo's highest-charting single is "Freak of the Week" featuring Jeremih, which charted at number 9 on the UK Singles Chart. Krept and Konan have both starred together in the film The Intent (2016) and reprised their roles in the prequel The Intent 2: The Come Up (2018).

== Early life ==
Krept is one of two siblings. His father was in prison for drug offences and his older brother was "a lot of trouble", so he felt like his mother's last hope. Krept went to secondary school at Stanley Technical College (now Harris Academy South Norwood), before continuing his A Levels at Richmond Upon Thames College, while Konan went to Haling Manor School (now Harris Academy Purley). Krept studied accounting at the University of Portsmouth.

== Music career ==
=== 2005–2010: Formation and career beginnings ===
In 2005, Krept and Konan met and formed a friendship when their schools played each other at football. They were making music under the same aliases but were also members of 'Gipset', a gang based in Gipsy Hill, in which Cadet, who was Krept's cousin, was also involved. In 2009 they became a musical duo and started to take music seriously. Shortly after their formation, in 2010 the duo released their first mixtape titled Redrum featuring collaborations from London underground rappers, Killa Ki, Snap and many more.

In 2010 the rap duo released their second mixtape titled Tsunami featuring several mainstream artists including Ghetts, Giggs, Scorcher and Lil Nova.

=== 2011–2014: Young Kingz and commercial breakthrough ===
In 2011, they released a cover of Jay-Z's and Kanye West's "Otis" which helped them rise to fame. The video reached five million views in its first five days of being uploaded to YouTube. However, with much pressure received from Jay-Z's legal team the video was removed from the duo's profile. Undeterred by the controversy, they released a cover of Drake and Lil Wayne's "The Motto", launched their own clothing line called Play Dirty and early into 2012 were invited to join the British rapper Skepta on his tour in the UK. They appeared on Tinie Tempah's 2011 mixtape Happy Birthday and in 2013 they released their third mixtape Young Kingz, with features from Chip, Tinie Tempah, G FrSH, Giggs, George the Poet, Yungen, Ari, Yana Toma, Fekky, Siah and Anthony Thomas. The album's promotional single "Don't Waste My Time" rose to fame in January 2014, with notable artists such as French Montana, Wretch 32, Chip, G FrSH, Double S, Lady Leshurr, Yungen, Sneakbo MNEK, Dru Blu, Jacob Banks and Dot Rotten all contributing to remixes of the track. Tinie Tempah also freestyled over the beat on Charlie Sloth's Fire in the Booth.

Winning Best UK Newcomer at the 2013 MOBO Awards was one of the big breaks the duo had. With low promotion compared to other artists. They released "Don't Waste My Time" as a single in March 2014 and it entered the UK Singles Chart at number 154.

=== 2014–2017: The Long Way Home, 7 Days and 7 Nights ===
On 29 June 2014, they attended the BET Awards which was held at the Nokia Theatre L.A. Live in Los Angeles, California and received an award for 'Best International Act: UK' by BET International and beating Dizzee Rascal, Laura Mvula, Rita Ora, Ghetts and Tinie Tempah.

On 3 March 2015, Croydon Advertiser announced the duo as the 39th most powerful people from the Croydon borough, for their pioneering movement and recent success in the music industry.

On 28 March 2015, they released a video for "Certified" featuring Rick Ross. The song serves as the first promotional single from their debut album The Long Way Home. The song was subsequently added to BBC Radio 1Xtra's playlists.

The Long Way Home was released in July 2015. The lead single from the album, "Freak of the Week", features vocals from American singer Jeremih and was released on 28 June 2015. The song entered and peaked at number nine on the UK Singles Chart, making it the duo's first top ten single on the chart and Jeremih's second. 25 June 2015 on YouTube, a remix of "Freak of the Week" was published by reggae and dancehall artists Popcaan & Beenie Man. The album was released on 5 July 2015 through Virgin EMI and Def Jam, and features numerous high-profile musicians, including Ed Sheeran, Skepta, Emeli Sandé and Wiz Khalifa.

They released a double mixtape, 7 Days and 7 Nights on 19 October 2017. 7 Days focused on rap, whilst 7 Nights focused on RnB. They peaked at number 6 and number 8 respectively on the UK Singles Chart.

=== 2017–2020: Revenge Is Sweet ===
On 10 May 2018, Krept and Konan released a song called "Crepes and Cones (Ya Dun Know)" to promote their restaurant. It featured Mostack and was produced by Steel Banglez.

On 3 November 2019, the duo released their first album in four years, Revenge Is Sweet.

=== 2021–present: We Are England ===
In June 2021, Krept and Konan appeared in the BBC Three documentary Krept and Konan: We Are England, where they make a football song for the UEFA Euros Tournament and get to know the England squad.

== Other projects ==
Krept and Konan launched the Positive Direction foundation on 6 November 2017 at Harris Academy South Norwood, Krept's old school. The foundation provides workshops in "music production, engineering and songwriting".

The duo also launched their restaurant, Crepes & Cones, on 12 May 2018 alongside grime artist J2K. Hundreds of fans lined up during its opening weekend, with food shortages due to the large number of orders. The restaurant also employs young offenders to give them a chance to rehabilitate. As of 2024, the restaurant is permanently closed.

In 2019, Krept and Konan also created the first series of BBC Three's The Rap Game UK alongside DJ Target. Adopting the format of the US version, seven MCs battled to get signed for a single record deal. The show was renewed for a second season, which aired in 2020.

In January 2025, they opened a supermarket called Saveways in Croydon, specifically tailored to serve the needs of black, Asian and ethnic communities.

== Personal lives ==
Konan lost his stepfather on 1 July 2011, when masked gunmen followed Konan into the house. One of the gunmen had targeted Konan for dating his ex-girlfriend, but shot his stepfather in the chest when he tried to chase the gunmen out of the house. This experience was later told on the song "My Story".

Konan's mother is also involved in the music business, and goes by the stage name Donna Michael. She is a reggae singer, and used to be a backing singer for his father, Delroy Wilson.

Krept lost his cousin, named Cadet, in a car accident on 9 February 2019. He has a daughter with model Sasha Ellese, named Nala, who was born on 11 June 2020.

The duo lost close friend and business partner Nyasha "Nash" Chagonda to suicide in June 2018, who was commemorated in "Broski" on the album Revenge Is Sweet.

They are both avid supporters of football club Manchester United.

== Achievements ==
In 2013, the duo broke the record for 'Highest-Charting UK album by an Unsigned Act'. The pair earned the title with Young Kingz, which entered into the top 20 in the UK Albums Chart. Following the rap duo success, they won a MOBO award (Best Hip-Hop Act 2014) and BET award.

Both were awarded the British Empire Medal (BEM) in the 2020 Birthday Honours for services to music and the community in Croydon.

== Discography ==
=== Studio albums ===
List of studio albums, with selected details and chart positions
Title	Album details	Peak chart positions			Certifications
Title	Album details	UK	UK R&B	IRE	Certifications
The Long Way Home	Released: 5 July 2015; Label: Play Dirty, Virgin EMI, Def Jam; Format: CD, digital download	2	1	—	BPI: Silver
Revenge Is Sweet	Released: 1 November 2019; Label: Play Dirty, Virgin EMI; Format: CD, digital download	5	—	74	BPI: Silver

=== Mixtapes ===
List of mixtapes, with selected details and chart positions
Title	Album details	Peak chart positions		Certifications
Title	Album details	UK	UK R&B	Certifications
RedRum	Released: 13 June 2009; Label: Self-released; Format: Digital download	—	—	
Tsunami	Released: 1 October 2010; Label: Play Dirty; Format: Digital download	—	—	
Young Kingz	Released: 2 September 2013; Label: Play Dirty, Virgin EMI, Def Jam; Format: Digital download	19	3	
7 Days	Released: 20 October 2017; Label: Virgin EMI; Format: Streaming, digital download	6	—	BPI: Silver
7 Nights	Released: 20 October 2017; Label: Virgin EMI; Format: Streaming, digital download	8	—	
Young Kingz II	Released: 7 February 2025; Label: Play Dirty; Format: CD, Vinyl, digital download	86	—	
"—" denotes a recording that did not chart or was not released in that territory.

=== Singles ===
==== As lead artist ====
List of singles as lead artist, with selected chart positions and certifications, showing year released and album name
Title	Year	Peak chart positions		Certifications	Album
Title	Year	UK	UK R&B	Certifications	Album
"Don't Waste My Time"	2014	154	31	BPI: Silver	Young Kingz
"Freak of the Week" (featuring Jeremih)	2015	9	2	BPI: Platinum	The Long Way Home
"Wo Wo Wo"	2017	44	18	BPI: Silver	7 Days
"For Me"	2017	58	24		7 Nights
"Crepes and Cones (Ya Dun Know)" (featuring Mostack)	2018	96	—		Non-album singles
"Pour Me Another One" (featuring Tabitha)	2018	73	—	BPI: Gold	Non-album singles
"Last Letter to Cadet"	2019	—	—		Non-album singles
"Ban Drill"	2019	73	—		Non-album singles
"I Spy" (featuring Headie One and K-Trap)	2019	18	—	BPI: Gold	Revenge Is Sweet
"G Love" (with Wizkid)	2019	28	—	BPI: Gold	Revenge Is Sweet
"Olé (We Are England)" (with S1lva, M1llionz and Morrisson)	2021	51	14		Non-album singles
"Dat Way" (featuring Abra Cadabra)	2023	80	—		Non-album singles
"Kilimanjaro" (featuring Oxlade)	2025	—	—		Non-album singles
"—" denotes a recording that did not chart or was not released in that territory.

==== As featured artist ====
List of singles as featured artist, showing year released and album name
Title	Year	Peak chart positions	Certifications	Album
Title	Year	UK	Certifications	Album
"Sweet Thing" (Rockizm featuring Ny & Krept & Konan)	2014	—		Rockizm
"Liar Liar" (Remix) (MoStack featuring Krept & Konan & J Hus)	2016	—	BPI: Silver	Non-album Single
"Chop My Money" (iLL BLU featuring Krept & Konan, Loski & ZieZie)	2018	64	BPI: Silver	Non-album single
"AirForce" (Remix) (DigDat featuring Krept & Konan & K-Trap)	2018	47	BPI: Gold	Non-album remix
"Right Now" (The Vamps featuring Krept & Konan)	2019	—		Missing You – EP
"Self-Obsessed" (Da Beatfreakz featuring Krept & Konan, D-Block Europe and Deno)	2020	27		Non-album singles
"Pisces" (Russ Millions featuring Krept and Konan)	2022	78		Non-album singles
"—" denotes a recording that did not chart or was not released in that territory.

=== Other charted songs ===
Title	Year	Peak chart positions		Certifications	Album
Title	Year	UK	UK R&B	Certifications	Album
"The Long Way Home" (featuring Derrick Morgan)	2015	—	37		The Long Way Home
"Dreams" (featuring Ed Sheeran)	2015	88	22		The Long Way Home
"Ask Flipz" (featuring Stormzy)	2017	30	12	BPI: Silver	7 Days
"Tell Me" (with D-Block Europe and Ling Hussle)	2019	23	—	BPI: Silver	Revenge Is Sweet
"First Time" (with Spice featuring Tory Lanez)	2019	63	—		Revenge Is Sweet
"—" denotes a recording that did not chart or was not released in that territory.

=== Guest appearances ===
List of non-single guest appearances, showing year released, other artist(s), and album name
Title	Year	Other artist(s)	Album
"They Got It Wrong" (Remix)	2013	Lethal Bizzle, Kano, Squeeks, Wiley	Non-album remixes
"Dance On My Own" (Remix)	2014	M.O	Non-album remixes
"Come Down" (Remix)	2016	WSTRN, Yungen, Avelino	Non-album remixes
"Robbery Remix"	2016	Abra Cadabra	7 Days
"Man's Not Hot" (MC Mix)	2017	Big Shaq, Lethal Bizzle, Chip, Jme	Non-album remixes

== Filmography ==
=== Film ===
Year	Title	Krept's role	Konan's role	Notes
2016	The Intent	Daniel	Leon	
2018	The Intent 2: The Come Up	Daniel	Leon	

=== Television ===
Year	Title	Krept's role	Konan's role	Notes
2014	The Truth Behind Entertainment	Themselves		Television Series Documentary
2015	Unsung	—N/a	Himself	Television Series Documentary
2017–2019	Soccer AM	Themselves		Series 22 (Episode 9) and Series 24 (Episode 2)
2018	The Big Narstie Show	Themselves/Guests		Series 1, Episode 5
2018	Don't Hate The Playaz	Themselves		Series 1, Episode 4
2019–2020	The Rap Game UK	Themselves/Co-Presenter's		Series 1 (Episodes 1–6) and Series 2 (Episodes 1–6)
2021	Krept and Konan: We Are England	Presenter's		Television Movie Documentary
2021	The Big Breakfast	Themselves		Revival Special (Black To Front Special)

=== Web ===
Year	Title	Krept's role	Konan's role	Notes
2018	Shiro's Story	—N/a	Tiny	Part 2-3 (Short YouTube Series)

== Tours ==
- 2011: Skepta Wedding Bells tour (supporting act)
- 2012: Devlin tour (supporting act)
- 2013: Young Kingz show live
- 2014: Tinie Tempah Demonstration tour (supporting act)
- 2016: Night to Remember Tour
- 2019: Revenge Is Sweet Tour

== Awards and nominations ==
Year	Award	Category	Title	Result
2011	Official Mixtape Awards	Best Mixtape 2010	Tsunami	Won
2012	Official Mixtape Awards	Best Video 2011	"Otis remix"	Won
2012	NXG Awards	Best Video	"Otis remix"	Won
2012	NXG Awards	Breakthrough Act		Won
2013	MOBO Awards	Best UK Newcomer		Won
2013	UMA's	Best Album	Young Kingz	Nominated
2013	UMA's	Best Group		Won
2013	UMA's	Best Hip Hop Act		Won
2013	BBC 1Xtra's Mixtape Awards	Best Group		Won
2013	BBC 1Xtra's Mixtape Awards	Best Mixtape	Young Kingz	Won
2014	Guinness World Records	'Highest-Charting UK album by an Unsigned Act'	Young Kingz	Won
2014	BET Awards 2014	Best International Act: UK		Won
2014	MOBO Awards	Best Hip-Hop Act		Won
2014	MOBO Awards	Best Male Act		Nominated
2014	MOBO Awards	Best Song	"Don't Waste My Time"	Nominated
2014	MOBO Awards	Best Album	Young Kingz	Nominated
2014	GRM Best of 2014	Lyricist of the Year		Won
2014	GRM Best of 2014	Best Video	"Don't Waste My Time"	Won
2015	MTV Brand New	Best Newcomer	'MTV Brand New Winners 2015'	Won
2015	BBC Radio 1's Teen Awards	Best British Group		Nominated
2015	MOBO Awards	Best Hip-Hop Act		Won
2015	MOBO Awards	Best Album	The Long Way Home	Won
2015	MOBO Awards	Best Male		Nominated
2015	MOBO Awards	Best Song	"Freak of the Week"	Nominated
2016	BET Awards	Best International Act: UK		Nominated
2018	NME Awards	Best Mixtape	7 Days/7 Nights	Nominated
2019	NME Awards	Best British Band		Nominated
2020	NME Awards	Best British Band		Nominated
2020	NME Awards	Best Band in the World		Nominated
