= The Buffet =

Studio album by R. Kelly
- Released: December 11, 2015
- Recorded: July 2014–July 2015
- Genre: R&B
- Length: 48:18
- Label: RCA
- Producer: R. Kelly; Dr. Luke; Cirkut; A.C.; JMIKE; Cem T.; J-Holt; D'Mile; Cashmere Cat; Ammo; Bigg Makk; Donnie Lyle; Maejor; Samuel Hindes; Keyel Walker; S1; Epikh Pro; Andre Manuel

R. Kelly chronology
Black Panties (2013)	The Buffet (2015)	12 Nights of Christmas (2016)

Deluxe version cover

Singles from The Buffet
- 1. "Backyard Party" Released: August 21, 2015; 2. "Switch Up" Released: November 6, 2015

The Buffet is the thirteenth studio album by American R&B singer-songwriter R. Kelly. It was released on December 11, 2015, by RCA Records. The album features guest appearances from Lil Wayne, Jhene Aiko, Ty Dolla Sign, Jeremih, Juicy J, Wizkid and Tinashe. The album also marks the debut of Kelly's own daughter, Joann Kelly going by the stage name Ariirayé.

== Background ==
The album serves as a follow-up to its predecessor Black Panties (2013). In May 2015, he announced that he decided to change the title from White Panties to The Buffet, because "it's just a variety of things" and would contain a mix of different genres of music. Kelly reportedly had written over 462 songs during the development of the album, from which he made his final album selection.

== Composition ==
According to Rolling Stone, The Buffet's first half leans more towards hip-hop influenced R&B, while on the second half of the record the singer "stretches out stylistically", with episodes of Memphis soul, quiet storm, and country music.

== Singles ==
"Backyard Party" was released as the albums's first official single on August 21, 2015. The written credits and the serving of its Record production that was handled and provided by R. Kelly. The song peaking at number 6 on the US Adult R&B Airplay.

"Switch Up" was released as the album's second official single on November 6, 2015. The song features guest appearances from an American rapper Lil Wayne and a fellow R&B recording artist Jeremih, with the writing and the production that was handled and provided by R. Kelly himself, along with J-Holt and Cem T.

=== Promotional singles ===
"Marching Band" featuring Juicy J, and "Wake Up Everybody" were released as promotional singles along with the album's pre-order on iTunes.

== Critical reception ==
Professional ratings
Aggregate scores
Source	Rating
Metacritic	60/100
Review scores
Source	Rating
AllMusic	3/5 stars
The Independent	3/5 stars
NME	3/5
The New York Times	(mixed)
Rolling Stone	3.5/4 stars
Spin	7/10
USA Today	3/4 stars

Upon its release, The Buffet received mixed reviews from music critics. At Metacritic, which assigns a normalized rating out of 100 to reviews from mainstream critics, the album received an average score of 60, based on nine reviews, indicating "mixed or average reviews".

Andy Kellman of AllMusic awarded the album three stars out of five, stating that the album "does have more dimensions than Black Panties" while also pointing out the fact he "remains driven to as ever to take a metaphorical theme to a comedic extreme and then deviate from it in direct and explicit fashion."

Andy Gill of The Independent gave the album three stars out of five, saying that the album by all accounts is "far from Kelly's best work" while also stating that it's "an OK effort overall."

Dan Weiss of Spin awarded the album with a seven out of ten, saying that the record is "like the 12 that came before it: hard to enjoy objectively." He also adds that its "better than just another R. Kelly album, but not enough to be worth saying so outside of a review, much less on a year-end list; call it a good one-night stand."

== Commercial performance ==
The album debuted at number 16 on the US Billboard 200 chart, with first-week sales of 39,000 equivalent copies (36,000 in pure album sales). It was the eleventh best-selling album of the week. The Buffet was the thirteenth solo album by Kelly to debut at number one on the Billboard's Top R&B/Hip-Hop Albums. In the second week, the album sold 26,000 equivalent copies (25,000 in pure album sales). The album would later sale over 500,000 copies in the United States

=== HuffPost Live Interview ===
Acknowledging the album's lack of record sales, Kelly reached out to his Facebook fans asking for support. In an interview on HuffPost Live, interviewer Caroline Modarressy-Tehrani suggested to Kelly that the lack of sales could be due to listeners feeling conflicted by Kelly's multiple allegations of sexual assault with minors. Kelly refused to answer and walked out of the interview.

== Track listing ==
Standard version
No.	Title	Writer(s)	Producer(s)	Length
1.	"The Poem"	Robert Kelly	R. Kelly	1:19
2.	"Poetic Sex"	Kelly; Samuel Hindes; Mikano Fayette; Firman Guion	Kelly; Hindes	4:21
3.	"Anything Goes" (featuring Ty Dolla Sign)	Kelly; Tyrone Griffin, Jr.; Dernst Emile II	Kelly; D'Mile	4:35
4.	"Let's Make Some Noise" (featuring Jhené Aiko)	Kelly; Jhené Chilombo; Keyel Walker; Anton Alexander; Johntá Austin; Bryan-Michael Cox; Kevin Hicks	Kelly; Walker	4:14
5.	"Marching Band" (featuring Juicy J)	Kelly; Jordan Houston; Lukasz Gottwald; Jeremy "JMIKE" Coleman; Gamal "LunchMoney" Lewis; Ryan Ogren; Samuel "A." Alexander; Castillo "C." Vasquez	Dr. Luke; Cirkut; A.C.; JMIKE; Kelly	3:56
6.	"Switch Up" (featuring Lil Wayne and Jeremih)	Kelly; Dwayne Carter, Jr.; Jeremih Felton; Jordan "J-Holt" Holt; Cem "Cem T." Tomak; Matthew Coleman; Lisa Antwil; Richard Maclean; Brittany "Starrah" Hazzard	Kelly; J-Holt; Cem T.	3:24
7.	"Wanna Be There" (featuring Ariirayé)	Kelly; Larry Griffin, Jr.; Stuart "Epikh Pro" Lowery	Kelly; S1; Epikh Pro	4:15
8.	"All My Fault"	Kelly	Kelly	3:25
9.	"Wake Up Everybody"	Kelly	Kelly	3:41
10.	"Get Out of Here With Me"	Kelly; Donnie Lyle	Kelly; Lyle	4:17
11.	"Backyard Party"	Kelly	Kelly	3:32
12.	"Sextime"	Kelly; Dorrell "Bigg Makk" Mays; Andre Manuel	Kelly; Bigg Makk; Manuel	4:14
13.	"Let's Be Real Now" (featuring Tinashe)	Kelly; Tinashe Kachingwe; Magnus August Høiberg; Joshua Coleman	Kelly; Cashmere Cat; Ammo	3:05
Total length:				48:18

Deluxe version (bonus tracks)
No.	Title	Writer(s)	Producer(s)	Length
14.	"I Just Want to Thank You" (featuring Wizkid)	Kelly; Ayodeji Balogun; Brandon Green	Kelly; Maejor	3:23
15.	"Keep Searchin'"	Kelly	Kelly	4:31
16.	"Sufferin'"	Kelly	Kelly	4:00
17.	"I Tried"	Kelly; Mays	Kelly; Bigg Makk	4:09
18.	"Barely Breathin'"	Kelly	Kelly	4:45
Total length:				69:06

Japan bonus track
No.	Title	Length
19.	"Damn Right"	3:13
Total length:		72:19

== Personnel ==
Credits adapted from AllMusic.

- R. Kelly – producer, vocals, arranger, mixing
- A.C. – instrumentation, producer, programming
- Jhené Aiko – featured artist
- Ty Dolla Sign – featured artist
- Lil Wayne – featured artist
- Jeremih – featured artist
- Ariirayé – featured artist
- Juicy J – featured artist, vocals
- Tinashé – featured artist
- Ammo – producer
- Angel Onhel Aponte – engineer
- Bigg Makk – bass, producer
- Cashmere Cat – producer
- Jeff Chestek – engineer
- Maddox Chhim – assistant
- Cirkut – instrumentation, producer, programming
- Diana Copeland – executive assistant
- Gared Crawford – violin
- Samantha Crawford – violin
- Antonio Daniels – keyboards
- Dr. Luke – instrumentation, producer, programming
- Jennifer Eashoo – production coordination
- Dernst "D'mile" Emile II – producer
- Blake Espy – violin
- Rachael Findlen – assistant
- Ghislaine Fleischmann – violin
- Mike Foster – engineer
- Abel Garibaldi – engineer, mixing, programming
- Serban Ghenea – mixing
- Clint Gibbs – engineer
- Larry Gold – conductor, string arrangements
- Erwin Gorostiza – creative design
- John Hanes – mixing engineer
- Samuel Hindes – producer
- J Holt – producer
- Kash Howard – wardrobe stylist
- Jaycen Joshua – mixing
- J-MIKE – Instrumentation, producer, programming
- Ryan Kaul – assistant
- George Kelly – personal assistant
- Jonathan Kim – viola
- Emma Kummrow – violin
- Dave Kutch – mastering
- Christian Lantry – photography
- Jennie Lorenzo – cello
- Donnie Lyle – bass, guitar, musical director, producer, programming
- Andre Manuel – producer
- Fabian Marasciullo – mixing
- Luigi Mazzocchi – violin
- McCoy – assistant
- Ian Mereness – engineer, mixing, programming
- Megan Nimerosky – assistant
- Karl Petersen – assistant engineer
- Epikh Pro – producer
- Irene Richter – production coordination
- S1 – producer
- John Shullman – assistant
- Cem T – producer
- Vern – assistant
- Alfonso Walker – keyboards
- Keyel Walker – producer
- Brian Warfield – engineer

== Charts ==
=== Weekly charts ===
Chart (2016)	Peak position
US Billboard 200	16
US Top R&B/Hip-Hop Albums (Billboard)	1

=== Year-end charts ===
Chart (2016)	Position
US Top R&B/Hip-Hop Albums (Billboard)	24

== Release history ==
Country	Date	Format(s)	Version(s)	Label
United States	December 11, 2015	CD; digital download	Standard; deluxe	RCA

== See also ==
- List of Billboard number-one R&B/Hip-Hop albums of 2016
