= Marching Band (R. Kelly song) =

Promotional single by R. Kelly featuring Juicy J

from the album The Buffet
- Released: November 12, 2015
- Recorded: 2014–15
- Genre: R&B; hip-hop
- Length: 3:56
- Label: RCA
- Songwriters: Robert Kelly; Jordan Houston; Lukasz Gottwald; Jeremy Coleman; Ryan Ogren; LunchMoney Lewis; Samuel Alexander; Castillo Vasquez
- Producers: Dr. Luke; Cirkut; A.C; JMIKE; R. Kelly

"Marching Band" is a song by American R&B singer R. Kelly, was released on November 12, 2015, as a promotional single of his thirteenth studio album The Buffet, it features American rapper Juicy J. Rapper Wale was supposed to feature in the song, but got later dropped by Dr. Luke. The song was written and produced by Kelly, Dr. Luke, Cirkut, A.C. and JMIKE with additional writing from Juicy J, Ryan Ogren and Lunchmoney Lewis

== Music video ==
The official audio for the single was uploaded to VEVO November 13, 2015.

== Track listing ==
- Download digital
1. Marching Band (featuring Juicy J) — 3:56
