= Freak of the Week =

Single by Krept and Konan featuring Jeremih

from the album The Long Way Home
- Released: 26 June 2015
- Genre: British hip hop
- Length: 3:45 (album version); 2:59 (radio edit)
- Label: Virgin
- Songwriters: ADP; Jeremih Felton; Casyo Johnson; Dijon McFarlane; Karl Wilson
- Producers: ADP; DJ Mustard

Krept and Konan singles chronology
"Don't Waste My Time" (2014)	"Freak of the Week" (2015)	"London" (2016)

Jeremih singles chronology
"Get Low" (2015)	"Freak of the Week" (2015)	"The Fix" (2015)

"Freak of the Week" is a song by British rappers Krept and Konan, featuring vocals from American singer Jeremih. The song was released for digital download in the United Kingdom on 28 June 2015 as the first single from their debut album The Long Way Home (2015). The single peaked at number nine on the UK Singles Chart. It is a hip hop song that contains a sample of "Who Am I (Sim Simma)" by Beenie Man.

== Music video ==
The music video was uploaded to Vevo on 5 May 2015. The video depicts the men rapping in a dim lit room while female dancers are behind them.

== Track listing ==
Digital single

No.	Title	Writer(s)	Producer(s)	Length
1.	"Freak of the Week" (featuring Jeremih)	Casyo Johnson; Karl Wilson; Jeremih; DJ Mustard; ADP	DJ Mustard; ADP	3:45

The Remixes EP

No.	Title	Writer(s)	Producer(s)	Length
1.	"Freak of the Week" (featuring Jeremih, Beenie Man and Popcaan)	Casyo Johnson; Karl Wilson; Jeremih; DJ Mustard; ADP; Beenie Man; Popcaan	DJ Mustard; ADP	4:19
2.	"Freak of the Week (Fastlane Wez Remix)" (featuring Jeremih)	Casyo Johnson; Karl Wilson	Fastlane Wez	3:11
3.	"Freak of the Week (Kat Krazy Remix)" (featuring Jeremih)	Casyo Johnson; Karl Wilson	Kat Krazy	3:48
4.	"Flowers x Patron" (featuring A2)	Casyo Johnson; Karl Wilson	A2	4:04
Total length:				15:22

== Charts ==
=== Weekly charts ===
Chart (2015)	Peak position
Scotland Singles (Official Charts)	14
UK Singles (Official Charts)	9
UK Hip Hop/R&B (Official Charts)	2

=== Year-end charts ===
Chart (2015)	Position
UK Singles (OCC)	77

== Certifications ==
Region	Certification	Certified units/sales
United Kingdom (BPI)	Platinum	600,000^{‡}
^{‡} Sales+streaming figures based on certification alone.

== Release history ==
Region	Date	Format	Label
Ireland	26 June 2015	Digital download	Virgin
United Kingdom	28 June 2015	Digital download	Virgin
