= Oui (song) =

Single by Jeremih

from the album Late Nights
- Released: October 30, 2015
- Recorded: 2015
- Genre: R&B; trap
- Length: 3:58
- Label: Def Jam
- Songwriters: Jeremih Felton; Khari Cain; @Girlslovedonut; Carl Martin
- Producers: Needlz; Brandon Bell

Jeremih singles chronology
| "The Fix" (2015) | "Oui" (2015) | "Switch Up" (2015) |

"Oui" (stylized as "oui") is a song by American singer Jeremih from his third studio album, Late Nights (2015). The song was released on October 30, 2015 as the third single from the album. The original title for the song was "Oui (You and I)" but was altered before commercial release. The title itself mean "yes" in French. The bridge interpolates the intro from "If I Ever Fall in Love" by Shai.

The song garnered a positive reception from critics who praised the production and vocal delivery of the lyrics. "Oui" peaked at number 19 on the Billboard Hot 100 on the chart dating April 23, 2016, giving Jeremih his fifth top 20 hit on that chart. It also charted at numbers 2 and 5 on both the Rhythmic and Hot R&B/Hip-Hop Songs charts respectively.

== Critical reception ==
Meghan Garvey of Pitchfork gave the song its "Best New Music" accolade lauding Jeremih's vocal performance, "It’s not a fireworks display or a peak-hour dancefloor filler. You sink into it. Light some candles. Summon the oracle. Late Nights season approaches."

Natalie Weiner of Billboard wrote that Jeremih is "classic" and "crooning" in this song. Writing for the Uproxx, Aspektz called the song production "cloudy" and "lovesick", while Jeremih's vocals "classic".

== Live performances ==
In November 2015, Jeremih performed "Oui" at the 2015 Soul Train Music Awards in Las Vegas, Nevada.

== Usage in media ==
The song was used in an Apple TV commercial as Nikolaj Coster-Waldau tries to practice a kissing scene with Alison Brie in a trailer for a TV show. Felton said he was not amused by the use of the song in the commercial.

== Charts ==
=== Weekly charts ===
| Chart (2015–2016) | Peak position |
|---|---|
| Canada Hot 100 (Billboard) | 92 |
| US Billboard Hot 100 | 19 |
| US Hot R&B/Hip-Hop Songs (Billboard) | 5 |
| US Rhythmic Airplay (Billboard) | 2 |
| US Pop Airplay (Billboard) | 36 |

=== Year-end charts ===
| Chart (2016) | Position |
|---|---|
| US Billboard Hot 100 | 55 |
| US Hot R&B/Hip-Hop Songs (Billboard) | 19 |
| US Rhythmic (Billboard) | 20 |

== Certifications ==
| Region | Certification | Certified units/sales |
|---|---|---|
| Brazil (Pro-Música Brasil) | Gold | 30,000^{‡} |
| New Zealand (RMNZ) | 4× Platinum | 120,000^{‡} |
| United Kingdom (BPI) | Gold | 400,000^{‡} |
| United States (RIAA) | 5× Platinum | 5,000,000^{‡} |
^{‡} Sales+streaming figures based on certification alone.
