= Wake Up Everybody (R. Kelly song) =

Promotional single by R. Kelly

from the album The Buffet
- Released: November 12, 2015
- Recorded: 2014–15
- Genre: R&B
- Length: 3:41
- Label: RCA
- Songwriter: R. Kelly
- Producer: R. Kelly

"Wake Up Everybody" is a song by American R&B singer R. Kelly. It was released on November 12, 2015, as a promotional single from his thirteenth studio album, The Buffet.

== Music video ==
The official audio for the single was uploaded to VEVO on November 13, 2015.

== Track listing ==
- Download digital
1. Wake Up Everybody — 3:41

== Charts ==
Chart (2016)	Peak position
US Adult R&B Songs (Billboard)	11
US R&B/Hip-Hop Airplay (Billboard)	35
