= Late Nights: The Album =

Studio album by Jeremih
- Released: December 4, 2015
- Recorded: 2013–2015
- Studios: Various: Chicago Recording Company in Chicago; Hit Factory Studios in Miami; Paramount Recordings, Chalice Recording Studios and G-Spot West Studios in Los Angeles; Marathon Studio in Hollywood; The Boom Boom Room in San Francisco; Mick Schultz Studios in Malibu; Encore Studios in Burbank
- Genre: Electro-R&B
- Length: 57:47
- Label: Def Jam
- Producers: Jeremy Felton (also exec.); Mick Schultz (also exec.); BongoByTheWay; Cardiak; DJ Mustard; Donut; Dre Moon; Frank Dukes; Hitmaka; Left Lane; London on da Track; The Mekanics; Murda Beatz; Needlz; OZ; RetroFuture; Soundz; Tariq Beats; Vinylz

Jeremih chronology
All About You (2010)	Late Nights: The Album (2015)	MihTy (2018)

Singles from Late Nights
- 1. "Don't Tell 'Em" Released: June 6, 2014; 2. "Planez" Released: January 22, 2015; 3. "Oui" Released: October 30, 2015; 4. "Pass Dat" Released: April 12, 2016

Late Nights (released with the subtitle Late Nights: The Album) is the third studio album by American singer Jeremih. It was released on December 4, 2015, by Def Jam Recordings. The album serves as a sequel to his mixtape Late Nights with Jeremih (2012) and the follow-up to his second studio album All About You (2010). Recording sessions took place during 2013 to 2015. The production on the album was handled by several producers, including: London on da Track, The Mekanics, Soundz, DJ Mustard, Needlz, Vinylz and Frank Dukes, among others. The album features guest appearances from Ty Dolla Sign, Jhené Aiko, Migos, Juicy J, YG, Twista, Future, Big Sean, J. Cole and Feather. Late Nights was supported by four singles; "Don't Tell 'Em", "Planez", "Oui" and "Pass Dat".

== Background and release ==
The album was originally called Thumpy Johnson, and was originally scheduled for release in 2013. In May of that year, Jeremih hired record executives Sean Combs and James Cruz as his talent managers, the former of whom would have executive produced the project. However, neither individual was credited on the final release. In August 2014, Jeremih announced that he was changing the title of the album to Late Nights: The Album, being a sequel to his 2012 mixtape Late Nights with Jeremih. During an interview with XXL, he explained his decision to change the title:

"The last body of work I put out was Late Nights," Jeremih said. "I still feel like how I was feeling when I recorded that. I was traveling, up late nights, recording all the time. It just felt like every record was catering to… I imagined if it was a big bed in the club, everybody would be in one big ass orgy off of all the songs. My first two albums I was making sad songs. I don’t feel like that no more. I was in a relationship then. I’m single as hell right now. You’re getting the best of my last single years".

On August 4, 2014, Jeremih released a mixtape called N.O.M.A. (Not On My Album), containing recorded songs not included on Late Nights. On September 26, 2014, Jeremih released promotional single "Nobody But U" produced by Cashmere Cat, but it did not make the album. During an interview with Billboard, Jeremih explained how his personal issues were the reason for the delays of the album's release. He said:

"I blame myself". I had a video scheduled. I just didn't show up to it because of..." he started, choosing not to finish his thought. "I'm not going to point my finger at somebody else at this point". Jeremih then pointed to some personal troubles he was having with the mother of his child. "I stopped caring about being Jeremih over the last few months," he said. "A lot of people don't know I have a two-year-old son. His mom wasn't allowing me to see him, and it was messing with me. I was internally unbalanced. But I just got out of that trial and I won".

Jeremih also expressed some frustration with his label. "Def Jam is hesitating and not being on my side," he explained. "I see other artists and how they're supported. It's hard when I'm on a roster with Rihanna, Rick Ross and Kanye West".

On May 15, 2015, in a separate interview with Billboard, producer and frequent Jeremih collaborator Mick Schultz confirmed that the originally released track listing and album cover had been changed and was no longer accurate.

On November 21, 2015, the official album artwork, release date and track list was leaked by music streaming service Deezer. The following day, snippets of the album were leaked to the internet. With no announcement or promotion to confirm its release prior, the album was officially released to digital platforms and streaming services on December 4, 2015.

== Singles ==
The lead single, "Don't Tell 'Em" featuring YG was released on June 6, 2014. The single became his third top 10 hit and eventually went triple platinum. The second single, "Planez" featuring J. Cole was released on January 22, 2015. The single reached top 10 on urban and rhythmic radio and later went triple Platinum. "Oui" was released as the third single from the album on October 30, 2015. The single reached number 19 on the Billboard Hot 100 becoming his fourth top 20 hit as lead artist. "Pass Dat" was released as a promotional single, along with the album's pre-order on December 1, 2015. The track was sent to urban contemporary radio on April 12, 2016, as the fourth single.

"Tonight Belongs to U!" featuring Flo Rida was released on April 21, 2015, but was scrapped from the final tracklist. The first promotional single, "Royalty" featuring Big Sean and Future was released October 29, 2015. The second promotional single is "Peace Sign" featuring Fabolous and Red Cafe was released November 18, 2015 but didn't appear on the album. Jeremih expressed in an interview with German music journalist Malcolm Ohanwe, that he had plans to issue "Impatient" with Ty Dolla Sign as a single. Despite never being released, the track was certified Gold by the RIAA in 2017 and later double platinum in 2020.

== Critical reception ==
Professional ratings
Aggregate scores
Source	Rating
AnyDecentMusic?	7.4/10
Metacritic	78/100
Review scores
Source	Rating
AllMusic	3/5 stars
Consequence of Sound	B+
HipHopDX	4/5 stars
Pitchfork	8.3/10
PopMatters	7/10
Spin	8/10
Tiny Mix Tapes	4/5 stars

Late Nights was met with generally positive reviews from music critics. At Metacritic, which assigns a normalized rating out of 100 to reviews from mainstream publications, the album received an average score of 78, based on seven reviews. Aggregator AnyDecentMusic? gave Late Nights 7.4 out of 10, based on their assessment of the critical consensus.

Meghan Garvey of Pitchfork said, "Late Nights, in its subtle seduction, feels all the more special in an era that increasingly rewards artists who shout the loudest. Jeremih makes you shut everything else out so that you can hear him whisper in your ear. It was worth the wait." David Sackllah of Consequence of Sound said, "Jeremih's vision is astounding, and the places in which he gets to indulge in adventurous risk-taking more than make up for the safe plays that surround them." Brooklyn Russell of Tiny Mix Tapes said, Jeremih's a night owl, not a lark, and on Late Nights: The Album — his first in a lustrum — he retreats even further from the spotlight he seemed predestined for, carefully crafting an album that surprisingly finds tranquility in the 28-year-old's thrill-seeker ways." Colin Joyce of Spin said, "It's a haze, reflective of the real world consequences of living out the entirety of your life in the twilight hours. Or maybe it's just the head trauma, from the setbacks and knockdowns that threatened to abort this record before it had a chance to even enter the room. Either way, the beauty's in the blur." Shirley Ju of HipHopDX said, "Song after song limbers as you go through them and guest appearances from some of the game's hottest artists ensures that he doesn't feel years late. In truth, he doesn't need them, delivering apple-pie-like R&B like the retro futurist he's been trying to be. Late Nights is exactly what Jeremih needed to get his career moving." Andy Kellman of AllMusic said, "Despite the winding path that led to it, Late Nights is together, neither tentative nor overcooked. It's apparently truer to Jeremih's vision than his first two albums, though only the most attentive listening reveals an artist with more dimensions – or more vocal ability – than the one who sang "Birthday Sex" and "Down on Me."

=== Accolades ===
Publication	Accolade	Year	Rank
Pitchfork	The 50 Best Albums of 2015	2015	41

== Commercial performance ==
Late Nights debuted at number 42 on the US Billboard 200, selling 19,000 album equivalent units, and 10,000 pure album copies in its first week. Despite the album's initial soft debut, On March 15, 2016, the album was certified gold by the Recording Industry Association of America (RIAA) for combined sales and album-equivalent units of over 500,000 units in the United States. The album was certified platinum March 20, 2018, and double platinum August 30, 2023.

== Track listing ==
Credits adapted from Jeremih's official website.

No.	Title	Writer(s)	Producer(s)	Length
1.	"Planez" (featuring J. Cole)	Jeremih Felton; Anderson Hernandez; Jermaine Cole; Adam Feeney; Adam Woods; Akinyele Adams; Regi Hargis; Kia Jeffries	Vinylz; Frank Dukes^{[a]}; Jeremih^{[c]}; Left Lane^{[d]}	4:00
2.	"Pass Dat"	Felton; Teddy Pena; Brittany Hazzard	RetroFuture; Jeremih^{[c]}; Left Lane^{[d]}	2:53
3.	"Impatient" (featuring Ty Dolla Sign)	Felton; London Holmes; Tyrone Griffin Jr.; Jermaine Denny	London on da Track	4:05
4.	"Oui"	Felton; Khari Cain; Brandon Bell; Carl Martin	Needlz; Donut	3:58
5.	"Drank"	Felton; Pena	RetroFuture	2:50
6.	"Giv No Fuks" (featuring Migos)	Felton; Michael Hernandez; Christian Ward; Altariq Crapps; Ozan Yildirim; Quavious Marshall; Kirshnik Ball	The Mekanics; OZ; Hitmaka; Tariq Beats^{[b]}	4:51
7.	"Feel Like Phil"	Felton; Uforo Ebong; Arin Ray	Hitmaka; Bongo	2:58
8.	"Royalty" (featuring Big Sean and Future)	Felton; Andre Proctor; Nayvadius Wilburn; Sean Anderson	Dre Moon; Jeremih^{[c]}; Left Lane^{[d]}	4:14
9.	"I Did" (featuring Feather)	Felton; Shane Lindstorm; Sayyid McDonald	Murda Beatz; Jeremih^{[c]}; Left Lane^{[d]}	4:06
10.	"Actin' Up"	Felton; Ebong; Jeff Lorber	Bongo	3:52
11.	"Remember Me"	Ricki G; Mick Schultz; Keith James	Schultz	2:55
12.	"Don't Tell 'Em" (featuring YG)	Felton; Schultz; Dijon McFarlane; Keenon Jackson; Michael Münzing; Luca Anzilotti; Thea Austin	Schultz; DJ Mustard	4:26
13.	"Woosah" (featuring Juicy J and Twista)	Felton; Keth Coby; McDonald; Carl Mitchell; Jordan Houston	Soundz	5:29
14.	"Worthy" (featuring Jhené Aiko)	Felton; Ward; Carl McCormick; Jhené Chilombo	Cardiak; Hitmaka	3:33
15.	"Paradise"	Felton; Schultz; James	Schultz	3:37
Total length:				57:47

Notes

- ^{^[a]} signifies a co-producer.
- ^{^[b]} signifies an additional producer.
- ^{^[c]} signifies a vocal producer.
- ^{^[d]} signifies an additional vocal producer.
- "Pass Dat" features additional vocals by Starrah.
- "Giv No Fuks" features background vocals by Herbert Travis.

Sample credits

- "Planez" contains interpolations of "Put It in Your Mouth" written by Akinyele Adams, Reginald Hargis and Kia Jeffries, as performed by Akinyele.
- "Oui" contains samples from "If I Ever Fall in Love" written by C. Martin, as performed by Shai.
- "Don't Tell 'Em" contains interpolations from the composition "Rhythm Is a Dancer" written by B. Benitez, J. Garrett and T. Austin, as performed by Snap!
- "Giv No Fuks" contains samples of "Ophelia" written by André Popp, as performed by André Popp.
- "Actin' Up" contains an interpolation of "Rain Dance" written by Jeff Lorber, as performed by The Jeff Lorber Fusion.

== Charts ==
=== Weekly charts ===
Chart (2015–2016)	Peak position
New Zealand Heatseekers Albums (RMNZ)	9
US Billboard 200	42
US Top R&B/Hip-Hop Albums (Billboard)	9

=== Year-end charts ===
Chart (2016)	Position
US Billboard 200	65
US Top R&B/Hip-Hop Albums (Billboard)	62

== Certifications ==
Region	Certification	Certified units/sales
Denmark (IFPI Danmark)	Gold	10,000^{‡}
New Zealand (RMNZ)	2× Platinum	30,000^{‡}
United Kingdom (BPI)	Gold	100,000^{‡}
United States (RIAA)	2× Platinum	2,000,000^{‡}
^{‡} Sales+streaming figures based on certification alone.

== Release history ==
Region	Date	Format	Label	Ref.
Various	December 4, 2015	Digital download; CD; streaming	Def Jam	
Various	November 30, 2018	Vinyl	Def Jam	
