= Don't Tell 'Em =

Single by Jeremih featuring YG

from the album Late Nights
- Released: June 6, 2014
- Recorded: January 2014
- Genre: Electro-R&B; hip hop
- Length: 4:29
- Label: Def Jam
- Songwriters: Jeremih Felton; Mick Schultz; Dijon McFarlane; Keenon Jackson; Michael Münzing; Luca Anzilotti; Thea Austin
- Producers: Schultz; DJ Mustard

Jeremih singles chronology
"Party Girls" (2014)	"Don't Tell 'Em" (2014)	"Hold You Down" (2014)

YG singles chronology
"nEXt" (2014)	"Don't Tell 'Em" (2014)	"Do It to Ya" (2014)

"Don't Tell 'Em" is a song by American singer Jeremih from his third studio album, Late Nights. It features American rapper YG, and was released as the first single from the album. The song peaked at number six on the Billboard Hot 100. Outside of the United States, "Don't Tell 'Em" peaked within the top ten of the charts in the United Kingdom, as well as the top twenty of the charts in Australia and Belgium.

== Background and composition ==
"Don't Tell 'Em"
"Don't Tell 'Em" is an electro-R&B song which interpolates "Rhythm Is a Dancer".

Jeremih wrote "Don't Tell 'Em" in January 2014, shortly after hearing another song he co-wrote, Kid Ink's "Show Me" (2013), went number 1 on the Billboard Rap Airplay chart.

The song's performers co-wrote the song with its producers, DJ Mustard and Mick Schultz. "Don't Tell 'Em" is an electro-R&B song with a hip hop production. It contains an interpolation of Snap!'s 1992 single "Rhythm Is a Dancer".

== Remix ==
The official remix of the song features American singer Ty Dolla Sign and rapper French Montana. A music video for the official remix directed by Eif Rivera was released on January 13, 2015. Other remix versions include Pitbull, Rick Ross, Migos, G-Unit, Ace Hood and T.I.

== Commercial performance ==
"Don't Tell 'Em" peaked at number six on the Billboard Hot 100 in late October, becoming Jeremih's third top ten hit and YG's first. The song was certified double platinum by the Recording Industry Association of America (RIAA). As of April 2014, the song has sold over 1,170,000 copies in the United States.

In the United Kingdom, "Don't Tell 'Em" entered and peaked at number five on the UK Singles Chart on October 12, 2014 – for the week ending date October 18, 2014 – becoming both Jeremih and YG's first top ten song in Britain, and Jeremih's first top 20 song on the UK Singles Chart since "Birthday Sex" peaked at number 15 on the chart in August 2009.

In spite of the song's commercial success, the song does not have a music video, making it the only song of 2014 to reach the top ten of the Billboard Hot 100 without a video. In an interview with the respective publication, Jeremih said that a video was scheduled, but he "did not show up for it".

=== Cover versions ===
New Zealand singer Lorde performed a slowed-down cover of the song for Live Lounge on BBC Radio 1, in the United Kingdom.

== Track listing ==
Remixes digital download

1. "Don't Tell 'Em" (DaaHype Remix) [featuring YG] [Explicit] – 4:05
2. "Don't Tell 'Em" (DaaHype Remix) [featuring YG] [Clean] – 4:02
3. "Don't Tell 'Em" (DaaHype Instrumental) [featuring YG] – 4:07
4. "Don't Tell 'Em" (Zoo Station Club) [featuring YG] [Explicit] – 6:10
5. "Don't Tell 'Em" (Zoo Station Radio) [featuring YG] [Explicit] – 4:07
6. "Don't Tell 'Em" (Zoo Station Club) [featuring YG] [Clean] – 6:09
7. "Don't Tell 'Em" (Zoo Station Radio) [featuring YG] [Clean] – 4:06
8. "Don't Tell 'Em" (Zoo Station Instrumental) [featuring YG] – 6:10

== Charts ==
=== Weekly charts ===
Chart (2014–2015)	Peak; position
Australia (ARIA)	14
Austria (Ö3 Austria Top 40)	65
Belgium (Ultratip Bubbling Under Flanders)	13
Belgium Urban (Ultratop Flanders)	11
Belgium (Ultratip Bubbling Under Wallonia)	46
Canada Hot 100 (Billboard)	30
Denmark (Tracklisten)	21
France (SNEP)	43
Germany (Deutsche Black Charts)	1
Germany (GfK)	57
Netherlands (Single Top 100)	81
Romania (Airplay 100)	39
Scottish Singles Sales (Official Charts)	8
Switzerland (Schweizer Hitparade)	70
UK Singles (Official Charts)	5
UK Hip Hop/R&B (Official Charts)	1
US Billboard Hot 100	6
US Hot R&B/Hip-Hop Songs (Billboard)	2
US Dance Airplay (Billboard)	2
US Dance Club Songs (Billboard)	10
US Latin Pop Airplay (Billboard)	40
US Pop Airplay (Billboard)	5
US Rhythmic Airplay (Billboard)	1

=== Year-end charts ===
Chart (2014)	Position
France (SNEP)	154
UK Singles (Official Charts Company)	74
US Billboard Hot 100	42
US Dance/Mix Show Airplay (Billboard)	29
US Hot R&B/Hip-Hop Songs (Billboard)	11
US Mainstream Top 40 (Billboard)	33
US Rhythmic (Billboard)	1

== Certifications ==
Region	Certification	Certified units/sales
Australia (ARIA)	Platinum	70,000^{^}
Brazil (Pro-Música Brasil)	Gold	30,000^{‡}
Denmark (IFPI Danmark)	Platinum	90,000^{‡}
Germany (BVMI)	Gold	200,000^{‡}
New Zealand (RMNZ)	3× Platinum	90,000^{‡}
Poland (ZPAV)	Gold	25,000^{‡}
Sweden (GLF)	Gold	20,000^{‡}
United Kingdom (BPI)	2× Platinum	1,200,000^{‡}
United States (RIAA)	5× Platinum	5,000,000^{‡}
Streaming
Denmark (IFPI Danmark)	Gold	1,300,000^{†}
^{^} Shipments figures based on certification alone.^{‡} Sales+streaming figures based on certification alone.^{†} Streaming-only figures based on certification alone.

== Release history ==
Region	Date	Format	Record label
United States	June 6, 2014	Digital download	Def Jam
Australia	June 16, 2014	Digital download	Def Jam
Austria	June 16, 2014	Digital download	Def Jam
Belgium	June 16, 2014	Digital download	Def Jam
Denmark	June 16, 2014	Digital download	Def Jam
Estonia	June 16, 2014	Digital download	Def Jam
Hungary	June 16, 2014	Digital download	Def Jam
Italy	June 16, 2014	Digital download	Def Jam
Kenya	June 16, 2014	Digital download	Def Jam
New Zealand	June 16, 2014	Digital download	Def Jam
Romania	June 16, 2014	Digital download	Def Jam
Russia	June 16, 2014	Digital download	Def Jam
Saudi Arabia	June 16, 2014	Digital download	Def Jam
Sweden	June 16, 2014	Digital download	Def Jam
Switzerland	June 16, 2014	Digital download	Def Jam
Turkey	June 16, 2014	Digital download	Def Jam
United States	June 24, 2014	Rhythmic contemporary	Def Jam
United States	August 5, 2014	Contemporary hit radio	Def Jam
Japan	August 19, 2014	Remixes digital download	Def Jam
United Kingdom	October 5, 2014	Digital download	Def Jam

== See also ==
- List of number-one R&B/hip-hop songs of 2014 (U.S.)
