= Planez =

Single by Jeremih featuring J. Cole

from the album Late Nights
- Released: January 22, 2015
- Recorded: 2014
- Genre: R&B; hip hop
- Length: 4:00
- Label: Def Jam
- Songwriters: Jeremih Felton; Anderson Hernandez; Jermaine Cole; Adam Feeney; Adam Woods; Akinyele Adams; Regi Hargis; Kia Jeffries
- Producers: Vinylz; Frank Dukes

Jeremih singles chronology
"Somebody" (2015)	"Planez" (2015)	"Like Me" (2015)

J. Cole singles chronology
"Apparently" (2014)	"Planez" (2015)	"Wet Dreamz" (2015)

"Planez" (originally titled "Planes") is a song by American singer Jeremih from his third studio album, Late Nights (2015). It features American rapper J. Cole, and was released in January 2015 as the second single from the album. It interpolates "Put It in Your Mouth" by Akinyele. The original version of the song featured a verse from fellow Chicago native Chance the Rapper. "Planez" garnered mixed reviews from critics, praising Jeremih's performance but criticized J. Cole's guest verse. The track peaked at numbers 15 and 44 on both the Billboard Hot R&B/Hip-Hop Songs and Hot 100 charts respectively. It was also certified 5× Platinum by the Recording Industry Association of America (RIAA). The single garnered Jeremih's first career Grammy nomination for Best R&B Performance at the 58th Annual Grammy Awards.

== Background ==
The song originally came about in January 2014 when Jeremih performed the song live featuring Chance the Rapper. However, this would be relegated to a remix, as the official version features J. Cole. Another remix was released featuring R&B singer August Alsina. The official version originally premiered January 17, 2015. The album version of the song omits the female voice in the intro which referenced the original album title, "Thumpy Johnson".

== Composition ==
Stereogum's Chris DeVille noted how the track's "sleek, sultry production" allows Jeremih to showcase his "neon-bright vocal talents".

== Critical reception ==
Meaghan Garvey of Pitchfork called it "this year's best radio R&B single in spite of J. Cole's paraphiliac trainwreck of a guest verse." Despite J. Cole "trying his best to sabotage the song", Brooklyn Russell of Tiny Mix Tapes wrote that it "displays Jeremih's best vocal work" on the album. David Sackllah of Consequence of Sound felt that J. Cole gave one of "the worst guest verse of the year" on the record alongside Big Sean's turn on "Royalty". Shirley Ju of HipHopDX said that the track "works despite its sheer redundancy", calling J. Cole's verse "the cherry on top, somehow, despite it being bombastic almost to a fault."

== Commercial performance ==
On the week of February 14, 2015, "Planez" debuted at number 30 on the Billboard Hot R&B/Hip-Hop Songs chart. It also debuted at number 95 on the Hot 100 the week of June 13. On the week of September 12, the song peaked at numbers 15 and 44 on both the Hot R&B/Hip-Hop Songs and Hot 100 charts respectively, staying on the former for 29 weeks and the latter for 20 weeks. The song also peaked at number nine on the Rhythmic chart the week of October 10, staying there for 20 weeks. It was certified 5× Platinum by the RIAA on September 21, 2023. Despite not charting in the United Kingdom, the track was certified gold by the British Phonographic Industry (BPI) on October 27.

== Awards and nominations ==
"Planez" was nominated for Best R&B Performance at the 58th Annual Grammy Awards and R&B Song of the Year at the 2016 iHeartRadio Music Awards, losing both awards to "Earned It (Fifty Shades of Grey)" by the Weeknd.

== Charts ==
Chart (2015)	Peak position
US Billboard Hot 100	44
US Hot R&B/Hip-Hop Songs (Billboard)	15
US Rhythmic Airplay (Billboard)	9

== Certifications ==
Region	Certification	Certified units/sales
New Zealand (RMNZ)	2× Platinum	60,000^{‡}
United Kingdom (BPI)	Gold	400,000^{‡}
United States (RIAA)	5× Platinum	5,000,000^{‡}
^{‡} Sales+streaming figures based on certification alone.
