= Jeremih =

American R&B recording artist (born 1987)

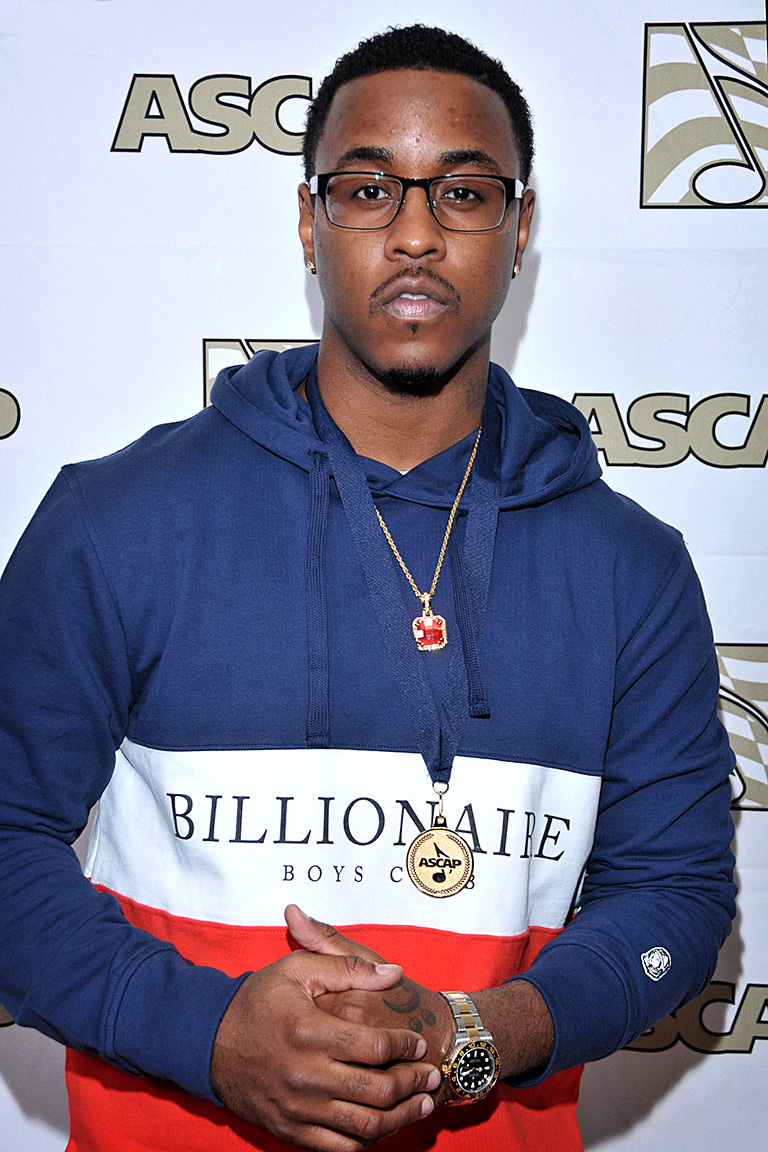
- Jeremih in 2015
- Born: Jeremy Phillip Felton; July 17, 1987 (age 39); Chicago, Illinois, U.S.
- Education: Columbia College Chicago
- Occupations: Singer; songwriter; rapper; record producer
- Years active: 2009–present
- Works: Discography; production
- Children: 2
- Relatives: Willie Taylor (cousin)
- Awards: Full list
- Musical career
- Genres: R&B; pop; hip hop
- Labels: Late Nightz; Def Jam (former)
- Member of: MihTy
- Producer(s): Mick Schultz
- Website: jeremih.com

Jeremy Phillip Felton (born July 17, 1987), known professionally as Jeremih (/ˈdʒɛrəmaɪ/ JERR-əm-eye), is an American R&B singer. He embarked on a musical career after meeting record producer Mick Schultz in 2008, and signed a recording contract with Def Jam Recordings the following year.

Jeremih's 2009 debut single, "Birthday Sex" peaked at number four on the Billboard Hot 100 chart; it preceded the release of his self-titled debut studio album in June that year, which peaked at number six on the Billboard 200. His 2010 single, "Down on Me" (featuring 50 Cent) saw continued commercial success and matched the chart position of "Birthday Sex", also receiving sextuple platinum certification by the Recording Industry Association of America (RIAA). It preceded the release of his second album All About You (2010), which was met with a critical and commercial decline. His 2014 single, "Don't Tell 'Em" (featuring YG) became his third top-ten hit on the Billboard Hot 100. The song and its follow-up singles, "Oui" and "Planez" (featuring J. Cole), each received quintuple platinum certifications by the RIAA and preceded the release of his third album, Late Nights: The Album (2015). He formed the duo MihTy with singer Ty Dolla Sign in 2018, with whom he has released an eponymous collaborative album (2018).

== Early life ==
Born in Chicago, Felton began playing drums at the age of three and is able to play the saxophone, several percussion instruments, and piano/keyboards. He attended Morgan Park High School, where he was part of the marching band as well as a Latin jazz band. He also learned to play percussion instruments like congas and timbales. Felton was a good student and earned academic honors at Morgan Park High School, allowing him to graduate a year early. He enrolled at the University of Illinois and Parkland College in Urbana-Champaign. After spending a semester at the university studying engineering, he wanted to change his education to something related to music. He transferred to Columbia College Chicago in 2007 to pursue a degree in music business. After performing a tribute to Ray Charles at one of the campus's talent shows, he received positive feedback and realized his vocal ability, saying that the "music was just taking over".

== Career ==
=== 2009–2011: Jeremih and All About You ===
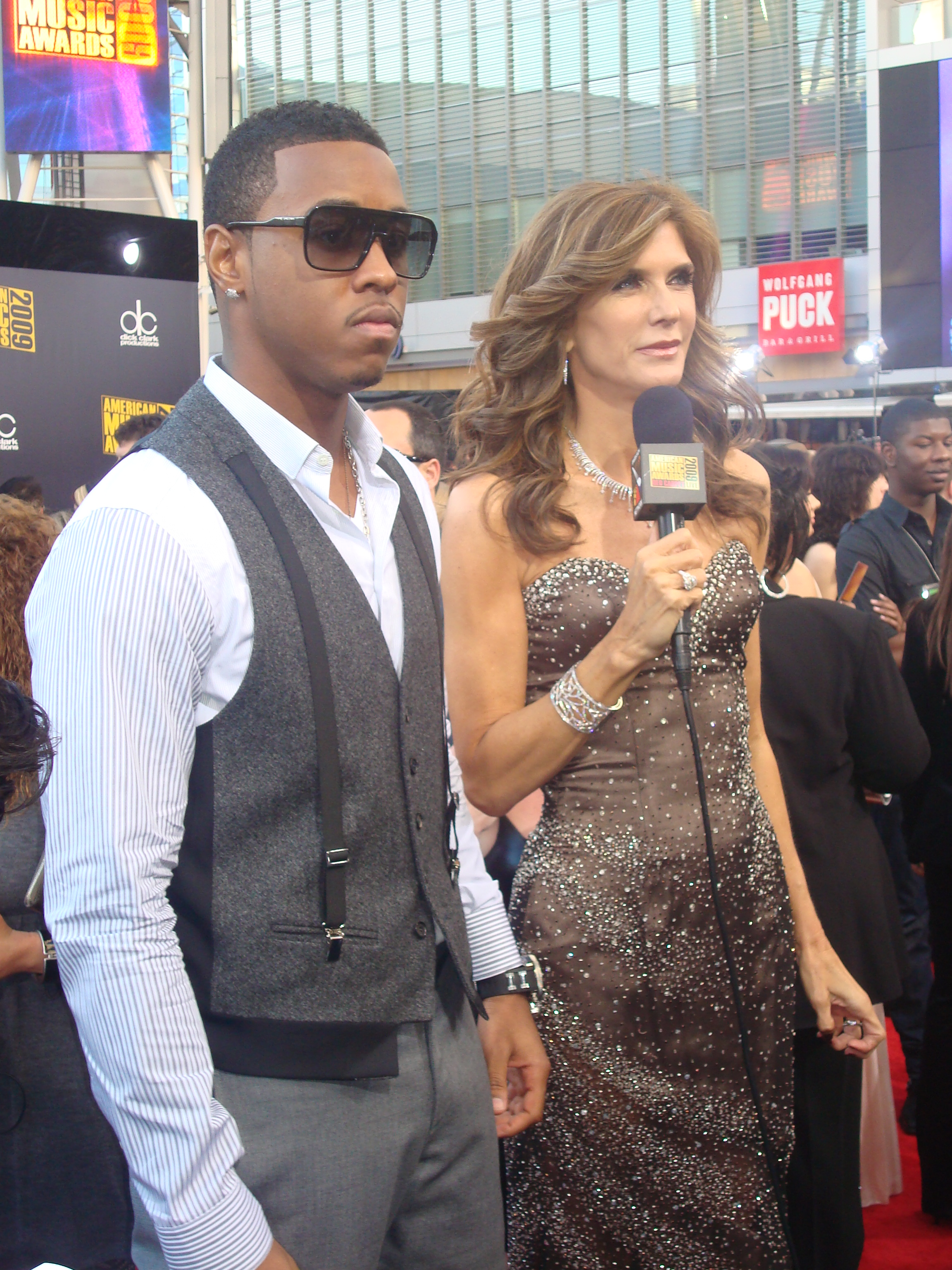
Jeremih with Julie Moran at the 2009 American Music Awards

While attending Columbia College Chicago, Jeremih collaborated with record producer Mick Schultz. Together, they recorded a song, titled "My Ride". Jeremih received guidance from his cousin, Day26 group member, Willie Taylor. In February 2009, Jeremih met with Def Jam's CEO Russell Simmons, and executive vice president of A&R Karen Kwak. After performing for the two, Jeremih signed a recording contract with Def Jam that same day. In 2009, Jeremih released his debut single, "Birthday Sex". The song later peaked at number 4 on the US Billboard Hot 100. In June 2009, Jeremih released his eponymous self-titled debut studio album, Jeremih. The album debuted at number 6 on the US Billboard 200, selling 59,000 copies in its first week. In promotion of the album, Jeremih took part in America's Most Wanted Tour, alongside Lil Wayne, Young Jeezy, and Soulja Boy Tell 'Em. The second single, "Imma Star (Everywhere We Are)", peaked at number 51 on the Billboard Hot 100.

In August 2009, Jeremih was selected by Ron Huberman and Mayor Richard M. Daley of the Chicago Public Schools (CPS) to campaign children to return to school. Community activists protested and demanded CPS to undo their decision, claiming that Jeremih's music was "not appropriate for students" and "promotes teen sex". Huberman argued that "school officials would be naive to pretend students don't listen to Felton's music already". Daley also argued that recording artists have the freedom of speech, noting that Jeremih was "a young man, [with a] back-to-school message, a young man who has had great success recording, producer, going to school, went to public school". In September 2009, Jeremih performed on ABC Daytime's soap opera One Life to Live, alongside recording artist Lionel Richie. The two performed "Just Go", a song from Richie's album with the same title.

On June 1, 2010, Jeremih released the first single for his second studio album All About You, titled "I Like" featuring Ludacris. "Down on Me" featuring rapper 50 Cent was confirmed to be the second single from the album. "Down on Me" charted on the number-one position for eight weeks total on Rhythmic Billboard chart. All About You was released on September 28, 2010. The following year, Jeremih and Rick Ross were featured on the song, which was performed by Wale, titled "That Way" from the compilation album Self Made Vol. 1.

=== 2012–2015: Late Nights ===
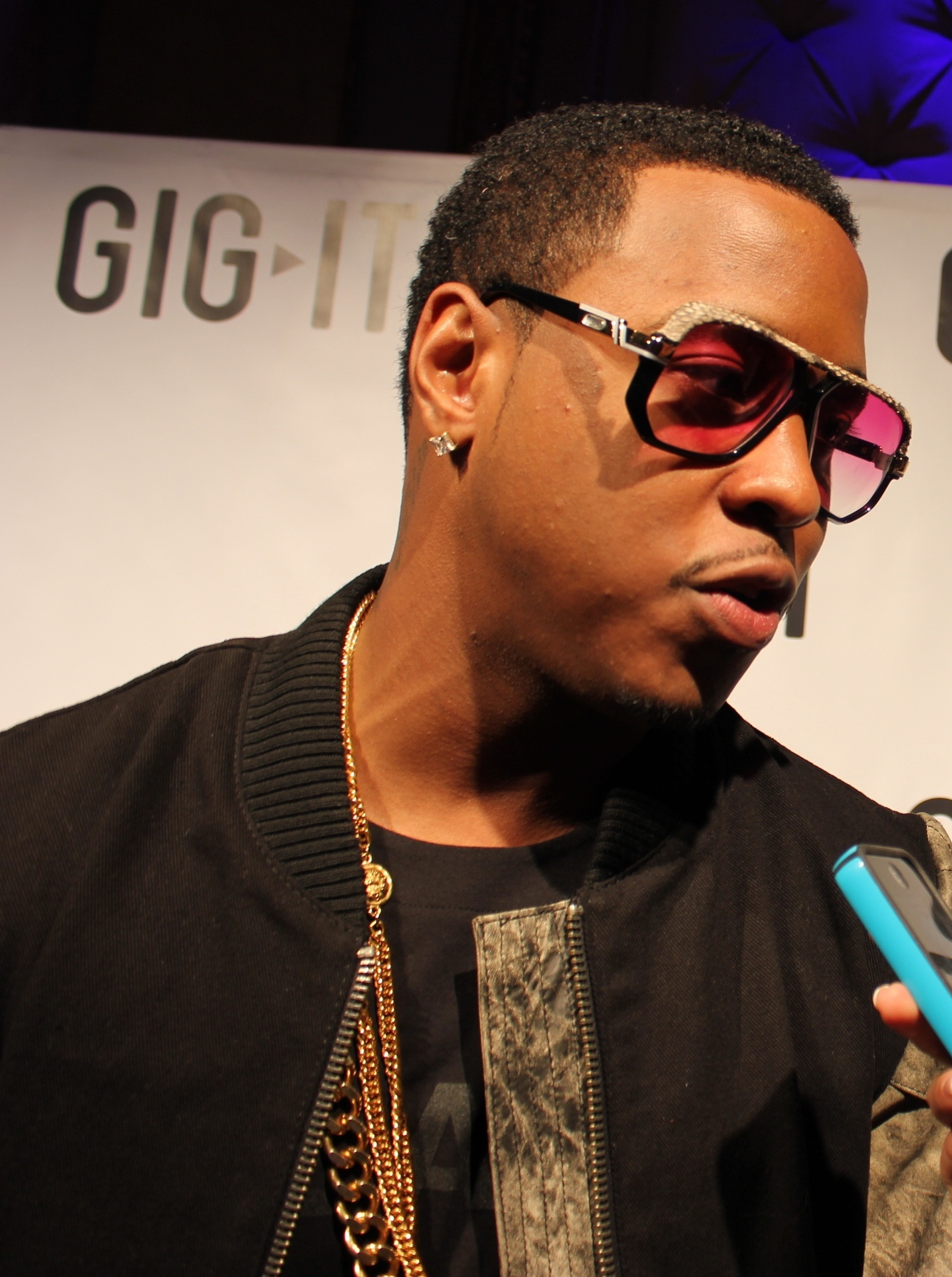
Jeremih in 2012

In December 2011, Jeremih confirmed he had been working on his third studio album, originally titled Thumpy Johnson. He announced plans from a summer 2012 release under Def Jam. However, the album was not released. Instead, Jeremih released his first mixtape titled Late Nights with Jeremih on August 7, 2012.

On November 5, 2014, Jeremih and members of his crew were involved in an incident at a Fuddruckers restaurant in Billings, MT in which Jeremih's associates allegedly "hassled" a young female restaurant employee and a manager for discriminating against them. Members of Jeremih's crew responded to the alleged racism by taking over the restaurant's microphone, throwing beer onto employees, and allegedly throwing a glass beer bottle into the kitchen, getting broken glass into the fryer and forcing the restaurant to close temporarily. The Billings Police Department sought but never issued arrest warrants in response to the incident. Surveillance footage of the altercation was published by TMZ, and the concert promoter for Jeremih's Billings performance offered refunds to audience members and renounced the actions taken by Jeremih and his crew.

"All the Time" is a song which originally appeared on his mixtape Late Nights with Jeremih but was re-released with an additional verse by rapper Lil Wayne as a single. The song was released on April 16, 2013, as a digital download. On July 17, 2014, Jeremih formally released his collaborative EP "No More" with Shlohmo through his Twitter account.

The first single off Jeremih's third studio album (retitled Late Nights: The Album), "Don't Tell 'Em" featuring YG, was released on June 6, 2014. On September 26, 2014, Jeremih released promotional single "Nobody But U" produced by Cashmere Cat, but it did not make the album. The second single, "Planez" featuring J. Cole was released on January 22, 2015. The first promotional single "Tonight Belongs to U!" featuring Flo Rida was released on April 21, 2015. The third single, "Oui" was released on October 30, 2015. The second promotional single, "Royalty" featuring Big Sean and Future, was released October 29, 2015. The third promotional single "Peace Sign" featuring Fabolous and Red Cafe was released November 18, 2015. The fourth single, "Pass Dat" was released December 1, 2015. On December 4, Jeremih finally released the album to critical acclaim. To promote the album, Jeremih embarked on his Late Nights Uncut Tour.

=== 2016–2018: MihTy ===
In 2016, Jeremih co-wrote "Woo" from Rihanna's eighth album Anti alongside The Weeknd and Travis Scott.

On February 7, 2016, Jeremih revealed his fourth studio album will be called, Later That Night in an interview with Billboard. In the same interview, he mentioned he had been recently writing songs for Kanye West and Nicki Minaj. In the summer of 2016, Jeremih headlined his first European concert tour. In July 2016, Jeremih released his second mixtape called Late Nights: Europe, which he recorded while on tour overseas. He stated that he was 90% done with his upcoming album Later That Night that would complete his "Late Night" series.

In June 2016, Jeremih announced a joint album with PartyNextDoor titled Late Night Party, which he said would be released before Later That Night. Following this announcement, the two artists headlined a joint tour called Summer's Over Tour scheduled for November and December 2016. In the last week of the tour, it was announced that Jeremih would removed from the tour. The decision came after Jeremih left the stage mid-performance in Chicago, sent a body-double to perform in Houston, and criticized PartyNextDoor on stage in Dallas. A few months later, Jeremih stated that there were arguments between the two artists' teams, but he had no ill will towards PartyNextDoor.

On Cinco de Mayo 2017, Jeremih released an EP, Cinco De MihYo, which he had written and recorded in 24 hours. In March 2018, Jeremih released an EP titled The Chocolate Box. Pitchfork stated, "When his projects are well-considered, or made with hyper-focused collaborators, he can be the most enchanting man in the room," but called one of the four tracks awkward and bored.

On June 8, 2018, Jeremih and Ty Dolla Sign released "The Light" as the lead single from their collaboration album MihTy. The 11-track album was released on October 26, 2018, and features guest appearances from Chris Brown, French Montana, and Wiz Khalifa.

In July 2018, Jeremih announced a joint tour with singer Teyana Taylor called Later That Night. The tour dates were from August 3 through September 8 in the United States. On August 15, Teyana tweeted that she would be leaving the tour due to mistreatment from Jeremih.

=== 2019–2024: Non-album singles and hiatus ===
In 2019, Jeremih was featured in Chantel Jeffries' song and music video "Chase the Summer". In March 2020, Jeremih was featured on the remix for "Baby Girl" by Bryce Vine. On May 3, 2021, DJ Khaled released a music video for his song "Thankful" from his album Khaled Khaled featuring Jeremih and Lil Wayne.

After a long hiatus from recording, Jeremih released his comeback single, "Changes", on October 21, 2022.

In April 2023, he introduced his first protégé, Illinois singer Murf Dilly, to the music scene with his debut single "2 C's". The song featured Jeremih as a guest vocalist and was released on his newly established Late Nightz Records.

=== 2024–present: Departure from Def Jam and upcoming fourth studio album ===
In February 2024, Jeremih was released from Def Jam Recordings after fifteen years under the imprint. On June 28, 2024, he released his first independent single, "Wait on It", featuring Bryson Tiller and Chris Brown.

== Musical style ==
Jeremih has cited Michael Jackson, Stevie Wonder, and R. Kelly as his biggest influences. He described their music as "timeless", calling them "true musician-artists". With the release of his debut album, Andy Kellman of Allmusic compared Jeremih's vocals to Slim of R&B group 112 and Raphael Saadiq, noting that his "charmingly sly voice...is hard to not like". In contrast, Ken Capobianco of The Boston Globe felt that Jeremih's voice was "thin", showing "little range". Jody Rosen expressed that Jeremih "has a way with tunes and hooks". He received comparisons to The-Dream, R. Kelly, and Stevie Wonder.

== Personal life ==
Jeremih has two sons.

=== Health ===
In November 2020, Jeremih was hospitalized in Chicago after testing positive for COVID-19. By November 14, he was reported to be on a ventilator in the intensive care unit. He was taken off the ventilator on November 19 but remained in critical condition. His spokesman said Jeremih has no underlying conditions. He was diagnosed with MIS, a condition associated with COVID-19. Jeremih was transferred out of intensive care on November 21, into a general hospital to make a full recovery. He was released from the hospital on December 4.

=== Legal issues ===
In December 2014, Jeremih was arrested and booked on charges of disorderly conduct and obstruction of justice for illegally boarding a plane after missing the last boarding call at Newark Liberty International Airport.

In July 2015, Jeremih was arrested and booked in Los Angeles for a misdemeanor DUI on his 28th birthday. He was released on a $15,000 bond.

== Discography ==
Studio albums

- Jeremih (2009)
- All About You (2010)
- Late Nights (2015)

Collaborative albums

- MihTy (with Ty Dolla $ign as MihTy) (2018)

== Awards and nominations ==
MOBO Awards

The Music of Black Origin Awards (MOBO Awards) is an awards ceremony established in 1995 by Kanya King.

Year	Nominee / work	Award	Result	Source
2009	Jeremih	Best R&B/Soul Act	Nominated	

American Music Awards

The American Music Awards is an annual awards ceremony created by Dick Clark in 1973.

Year	Nominee / work	Award	Result	Source
2009	Jeremih	T-Mobile Soul/R&B Breakthrough Artist	Nominated	

Grammy Awards

Year	Nominee / work	Award	Result	Source
2016	"Planez" (with J. Cole)	Best R&B Performance	Nominated	

NAACP Awards

An NAACP Image Award is an accolade presented by the American National Association for the Advancement of Colored People to honor outstanding people of color in film, television, music, and literature.

Year	Nominee / work	Award	Result	Source
2010	Jeremih	Outstanding New Artist	Nominated	

Chicago Music Awards

The Chicago Music Awards is an annual awards ceremony for music artist professionals to get recognized for their talents and hard work. Ephraim Martin, CMA President, is the founder.

Year	Nominee / work	Award	Result	Source
2010	Jeremih	Best New Entertainer Of The Year	Won	
2010	Jeremih	Songwriter Of The Year	Won	
2010	Jeremih	R&B Entertainer Of The Year	Won	
2011	Jeremih	Best Male Vocalist Of The Year	Won	

Billboard Music Awards

The Billboard Music Award is an honor given by Billboard magazine, the preeminent publication covering the music business. The Billboard Music Awards show had been held annually in December until it went dormant in 2007, but it returned in May 2011. By Billboard Music Award.

Year	Nominee / work	Award	Result	Source
2012	Jeremih Ft.50 Cent-Down On Me	Top R&B Song	Nominated	
2015	Jeremih Ft.YG-Don't Tell Em	Top R&B Song	Nominated	

iHeartRadio Music Awards

The iheartRadio award honors the biggest Artists and Songs of the year.

Year	Nominee / work	Award	Result	Source
2015	Jeremih Ft YG-Don't Tell Em	Hip Hop/R&B Song of the Year	Won	
