= Fahrenheit 451 (disambiguation) =

Fahrenheit 451 is a novel by Ray Bradbury.

Fahrenheit 451 may also refer to:

- Fahrenheit 451 (1966 film), a 1966 film adaptation of the novel
- Fahrenheit 451 (2018 film), a television adaptation of the novel
- Fahrenheit 451 (video game), a 1984 computer game based on the novel
- "Fahrenheit 451", a song by ATB from Trilogy
- "Fahrenheit 451", a song by Hawkwind from Choose Your Masques
- "Fahrenheit 451", a song by Utopia from Swing to the Right
- "Fahrenheit 451", an episode of the anime series R.O.D the TV
- Fahrenheit 451 Books, a former bookstore in Laguna Beach, California

== See also ==
- Fahrenheit (disambiguation)
- Centigrade 232, a poem by Robert Calvert
- Fahrenheit 9/11, a 2004 documentary film by Michael Moore
- Fahrenheit 11/9, a 2018 documentary film by Michael Moore
