= Fahrenheit (disambiguation) =

Fahrenheit is a temperature scale named after the physicist Daniel Gabriel Fahrenheit which is used in the United States.

Fahrenheit may also refer to:

== Entertainment ==
=== Music ===
- Fahrenheit (Toto album)
- Fahrenheit (Fahrenheit album)
- Fahrenheit (Chilean band), a hard rock band
- Fahrenheit (Taiwanese band), a Taiwanese boy band
- Fahrenheit (Thai band), a Thai rock band
- 7800° Fahrenheit, an album by Bon Jovi
- "Fahrenheit", a song by Joe McElderry from Wide Awake
- "Falling Like the Fahrenheit", a song by Kamelot from their 2012 album Silverthorn

=== Video games ===
- Fahrenheit (1995 video game)
- Fahrenheit (2005 video game), also known as Indigo Prophecy in North America

== Other uses ==
- Fahrenheit (crater)
- Fahrenheit (graphics API), computer software
- Fahrenheit (fanzine)
- Fahrenheit (magazine)
- Fahrenheit (perfume), a perfume made by Christian Dior
- Fahrenheit (roller coaster), at Hersheypark
- Fahrenheit 451, a novel by Ray Bradbury
- Fahrenheit 451 (1966 film), Francois Truffaut's film adaptation of the novel
- Fahrenheit 9/11, a 2004 movie by Michael Moore
- Fahrenheit 11/9, a 2018 movie by Michael Moore

== See also ==
- Fahrenheit 451 (disambiguation)
