= Six Magics =

- Origin: Santiago, Chile
- Genres: Heavy metal, Progressive metal, Power metal, Symphonic metal
- Years active: 1996–present
- Members: Elizabeth Vásquez; Erick Avila; Pablo Proharam; Mauricio Nader; Pablo Stagnaro
- Website: www.sixmagics.cl

Six Magics is a Chilean metal group formed initially by Pablo Stagnaro, Erick Ávila, Nicolás Espinoza, Juan Pablo Pizarro and Sergio Villarroel.

== History ==
At first, Erick Ávila composed the music while Juan Pablo Pizarro and Sergio Villarroel wrote the lyrics. Their songs were originally all in Spanish. After a year, in 1996, in the recording studios of Balmaceda Arte Joven, they recorded four songs for the EP Trilogía de un guerrero (Trilogy of a Warrior).

In 1998, Juan Pablo Pizarro decided to move to France. Six Magics brought on a new bassist, Rodolfo Sánchez. In 1999, Sergio Domínguez entered as a new vocalist and Sebastián Carrasco entered as a keyboardist. With these changes, Six Magics began to compose the lyrics in English and worked to the goal of creating a professional album. While they were working in their first professional production, they were offered the opportunity to be the opening act for the Finn band Nightwish in July 2000. In 2001, they played as the opener for Italian band Rhapsody. In January 2001, after the completion of these tours, the band returned to the recording studio. They performed work with narrations and epic stories influenced by the Baroque and Classic romantic style.

At the beginning of 2002, two new members came to the band: Gabriel Hidalgo on guitar and Mauricio Nader on bass. With this new formation, the band enhanced its acoustic sound. They released their first album, Dead Kings of the Unholy Valley, in July 2002. In 2003, they began to work on their second album, The Secrets Of An Island. This was a conceptual work about the mythological history of Chiloé Island. The songs on this album used choirs, folk instruments, and was influenced by ethnic Chilean music. Six Magics started then and continued to mix ard rock with a Latin American traditional beat in a style called Folk Metal. Their concerts became larger and more decorated productions and began to attract larger audiences. At one point, singer Sergio Domínguez fell ill and was temporarily replaced by Cristóbal Flores.

In 2004, the band flew to Germany, France, and Spain to promote their new albums and tour and is well received. Pianist Sebastián Carrasco left in 2005, and the band decided not to replace him and instead become a quintet. They then prepared a film of their work, entitled Dead Secrets, to be shown at the Theater Province. The DVD was delayed due to technical difficulties and was not resolved until the end of the year, so instead of being shown at the theater was released straight to DVD.

In January 2007, Six Magics began work on their third album. The production is directed by the North American David Prater (Dream Theater, FireHouse, Fahrenheit). In May of the 2007, Sergio Domínguez decided to leave the band to spend more time with his family and his upcoming son.

On June 26, 2008, they released a single called Behind the Sorrow ahead of their third album, Animal, which was released in August, on September they played with Tarja Turunen.

In 2006, they released “Dead Secrets”, their first live DVD containing songs from their two previous albums. After the DVDs release, the decision was made to immediately record a third record with the producer David Prater. His work with Dream Theater produced two of their most successful recordings, “Images and Words” and “A Change Of Seasons”.

From a creative standpoint, Six Magics underwent a period of development following the decision to enlist the services of Prater and the subsequent arrival of Elizabeth Vasquez as the band's new lead vocalist. Her addition marked a change in the band's vocal style and musical direction.

In 2010, to support the new record Behind the Sorrow, Six Magics launched a European tour that kept the musicians on the road for nearly two months. They played in different countries including Germany, Belgium, Switzerland, Netherlands and Turkey.

In 2011, Six Magics started working on their next studio album. Six Magics also played in Chile at The Metal Fest, the first version of a Chilean festival in which bands like Testament, Blind Guardian, Anthrax, UDO among others were headliners. In July 2012, the new material of the band entitled Falling Angels was released in Europe, Chile, Japan and US.

== Members ==
=== Current ===
- Elizabeth Vásquez (Vocals)
- Erick Avila (Guitar)
- Pablo Proharam (Guitar)
- Pablo Stagnaro (Drums)

=== Past ===
- Juan Pablo Pizarro (Bass)
- Sergio Villarroel (Vocals)
- [Sergio Domínguez (Vocals)
- Rodolfo Sánchez (Bass)
- M.Nader (Bass)
- Gabriel Hidalgo (Guitar)
- Sebastian Carrasco (Keyboard)

== Discography ==
=== Albums ===
- Trilogía de un guerrero (1996)
- Dead Kings Of The Unholy Valley (2001)
- The Secrets Of An Island (2003)
- Animal (2008)
- Behind the Sorrow (2010)
- Falling Angels (2012)

=== Singles ===
- "Behind The Sorrow" (2008)

=== DVD ===
- Dead Secret (2006)
