= Mr. Fahrenheit =

Mr. Fahrenheit may refer to:

- Daniel Gabriel Fahrenheit, creator and namesake of the Fahrenheit scale
- A song lyric from "Don't Stop Me Now" by Queen
- A nickname for Freddie Mercury from Queen
- Mr. Fahrenheit (pageant), gay beauty pageant in Philippines
- Mr. Fahrenheit, 2016 young adult novel by T. Michael Martin

== See also ==
- Fahrenheit (disambiguation)
