= Fahrenheit 451 (2018 film) =

Film by Ramin Bahrani

- Release poster
- Directed by: Ramin Bahrani
- Screenplay by: Ramin Bahrani; Amir Naderi
- Based on: Fahrenheit 451 by Ray Bradbury
- Produced by: David Coatsworth
- Starring: Michael B. Jordan; Michael Shannon; Sofia Boutella; Lilly Singh; Martin Donovan
- Cinematography: Kramer Morgenthau
- Edited by: Alex Hall
- Music by: Antony Partos; Matteo Zingales
- Production companies: HBO Films; Outlier Society
- Distributed by: HBO
- Release dates: May 12, 2018 (Cannes); May 19, 2018 (United States)
- Running time: 101 minutes
- Country: United States
- Language: English

Fahrenheit 451 is a 2018 American dystopian drama film directed and co-written by Ramin Bahrani, loosely based on the 1953 book of the same name by Ray Bradbury. It is a remake of the 1966 film of the same name. It stars Michael B. Jordan, Michael Shannon, Khandi Alexander, Sofia Boutella, Lilly Singh, Grace Lynn Kung and Martin Donovan. Set in a future America, the film follows a "fireman" whose job it is to burn books, which are now illegal, only to question society after meeting a young woman. After premiering at the 2018 Cannes Film Festival, the film aired on HBO on May 19, 2018, receiving mixed critical reviews, with praise for the performances and visuals, but criticism for the screenplay and lack of faithfulness to the source material.

== Plot ==
In the future, after a Second American Civil War, most reading in the United States is confined to the Internet, called "The 9", and most books are banned (except for greatly simplified versions of books, such as the Bible, To the Lighthouse and Moby Dick). The fire department serves a different function: firemen do not contain fires, but rather start them. Furthermore, they are ordered to burn books, in addition to buildings.

Guy Montag is a fireman living in Cleveland. Working under Captain Beatty, Montag performs his work without question, believing that by following his captain's example, he is serving and protecting society.

Montag's consciousness is expanded by reading Dostoyevsky’s Notes from Underground, regarded as one of the first dystopian novels, which leads to his questioning of the established order and to his rebellion against it.

His attitude further changes when he meets an informant, Clarisse. Montag's actions and convictions are challenged when she is revealing some of the real history of the US and the rise of the Ministry. When he finally decides to rebel and understand how the "Eels" (book-reading outcasts) read, he comes to a realization—he now wants to read as well.

Montag goes to Captain Beatty, asking to be relieved of his duties, but the Captain does not accept. Undeterred, Montag, decides to help a group of rebels who have a plan to reproduce their knowledge through animals. This is achieved by embedding all their books into a starling's DNA. The starling is to be taken across the border into Canada where waiting scientists will extract its DNA, thereby enabling the knowledge contained therein to continue existing and to be disseminated to others in the future. Montag has the mission of obtaining a transponder from his fire department, with the intent to secure it onto the bird. Once attached, the starling will be traceable by a team of scientists who will then transfer the DNA to other animals.

After Montag steals the transponder, Captain Beatty goes to Montag to confirm his intention to continue as a fireman burning books. The firemen go to Montag's house and find a large stash of planted books. On Beatty's orders, Montag starts burning the stash. Montag remembers that Captain Beatty was among the group of firemen who beat his father for being an Eel and stops burning the books. Montag is confronted by Captain Beatty, who erases his identity. After burning a fireman, Montag flees as a fugitive, eventually connecting with the group of Eels. The Eels' house is discovered by the firemen. Montag fixes a transponder to the bird's leg so that the scientists in Canada can find it. Captain Beatty confronts Montag and attempts to stop him, but Beatty allows the bird to fly away. Instead, after Montag releases the bird, Beatty angrily sets him on fire.

The starling makes it to Canada and joins with an immense flock of other starlings.

== Cast ==
- Michael B. Jordan as Guy Montag
- Michael Shannon as Captain John Beatty
- Sofia Boutella as Clarisse McClellan
- Khandi Alexander as Toni Morrison
- Lilly Singh as Raven
- Martin Donovan as Commissioner Nyari
- Andy McQueen as Gustavo
- Dylan Taylor as Douglas
- Grace Lynn Kung as Chairman Mao
- Keir Dullea as Historian
- Cindy Katz as Yuxie

== Production ==
Ramin Bahrani had been developing an adaptation of Bradbury's novel as early as June 2016. In April 2017, Michael Shannon and Michael B. Jordan were cast in the film, with Jordan also assuming an executive producer role. In June, Sofia Boutella became attached to the project, YouTube personality Lilly Singh was cast as a vlogger, and Laura Harrier was cast as Millie, Montag's wife, though she was ultimately cut from the film. Filming began in July 2017, with the additions of Martin Donovan, Andy McQueen and Grace Lynn Kung to the cast in August.

== Release ==
On January 11, 2018, HBO's Twitter account released a trailer for the film, featuring the tagline, "Fact. Fiction. It all burns." The film was released on May 19, 2018, after premiering at the 2018 Cannes Film Festival.

It was released on DVD and Blu-ray on September 18, 2018.

== Reception ==
On review aggregator website Rotten Tomatoes, the film holds an approval rating of 32% based on 82 reviews, and an average rating of 4.9/10. The site's critical consensus reads, "Fahrenheit 451 fails to burn as brightly as its classic source material, opting for slickly mundane smoke-blowing over hard-hitting topical edge." On Metacritic, which assigns a normalized rating to reviews, the film has a score of 47 out of 100, based on 19 critics, indicating "mixed or average" reviews.

For IndieWire, Ben Travers gave the film a grade of "C+", writing that "Michael B. Jordan and Michael Shannon make for a compelling pair in an aptly modernized update that still feels far too conventional." Todd McCarthy of The Hollywood Reporter praised the production value but wrote that (referring to the ending of the adaptation) "as disturbing as the forecast for American life and politics may be in Fahrenheit 451, this wrinkle nonetheless serves to seriously diminish the absolute need to preserve texts when they're known to still exist elsewhere; when America gets its head on straight again, there is backup to resupply the intellectually deprived."

In his review for RogerEbert.com, Odie Henderson noted the steering of Bradbury's ideas into the factual realm, drawing parallels with the satirical direction of Network being weakened by the evolution of television, adding that "much of the novel's shock value and allegorical power also feels weakened as a result."

IGN's Matt Fowler wrote that the film "features strong performances and a dancing, flickering visual flare, but all that's not enough to cover up the clunkiness of the script and the strain of reconfiguring this always relevant-yet still very 1950s-story to fit within our 2018 specifics". Entertainment Weekly's Darren Franich wrote that the film "has its heart in the right place, but its head sure crawled up somewhere."

In The Baffler, Alexander Zaitchik described HBO's adaptation as "gut[ting] Fahrenheit of its core idea ... roughly akin to a GlaxoSmithKline production of Aldous Huxley’s Brave New World."

== Accolades ==
Year	Ceremony	Category	Nominee(s)	Result	Ref.
2018	Primetime Creative Arts Emmy Awards	Outstanding Television Movie	Fahrenheit 451	Nominated	
2018	Primetime Creative Arts Emmy Awards	Outstanding Cinematography for a Limited Series or Movie	Kramer Morgenthau	Nominated	
2018	Primetime Creative Arts Emmy Awards	Outstanding Fantasy/Sci-Fi Costumes	Meghan Kasperlik, Renee Fontana, Cori Burchell	Nominated	
2018	Primetime Creative Arts Emmy Awards	Outstanding Sound Editing for a Limited Series, Movie, or Special	Nick Forshager, Joe Bracciale, Martin Gwynn Jones, Brent Pickett, Claire Dobson, Robert Bertola, Alex Bullick, Tyler Whitham, Matt Decker, John Elliot	Nominated	
2018	Primetime Creative Arts Emmy Awards	Outstanding Sound Mixing for a Limited Series or Movie	Tom Fleischman, Henry Embry, George Lara, Mark DeSimone	Nominated	
2019	Producers Guild Awards	Outstanding Producer of Streamed or Televised Motion Pictures	Sarah Green, Ramin Bahrani, Michael B. Jordan, Alan Gasmer, Peter Jaysen, and David Coatsworth	Won	

== See also ==
- Fahrenheit 451 (1966 film)
