= Guy Montag =

Protagonist of Ray Bradbury's 1953 dystopian novel Fahrenheit 451

- Fahrenheit 451 character
- Oskar Werner as Guy Montag, from the 1966 film adaption
- Created by: Ray Bradbury
- Portrayed by: Oskar Werner (1966 film); Michael B. Jordan (2018 film)

In-universe information
- Gender: Male
- Occupation: Fireman (book burner)
- Spouse: Mildred (wife)

Guy Montag is a fictional character and the protagonist in Ray Bradbury's dystopia novel Fahrenheit 451 (1953). He is depicted living in a futuristic town where he works as a "fireman" whose job is to burn books and the buildings they are found in.

== Role in plot ==
At the opening of the novel, he is happy in his work destroying books and never wonders about his role as a tool of thought suppression. Several events cause him to question his own existence:

- First, he meets Clarisse McClellan, a 17-year-old, while walking home from work. His talks with her are thought-provoking and assuage Montag's loneliness. Her death spurs him into becoming a radical.
- Second, he discovers that his wife, who prefers watching The Family, her favorite program on television or the parlor walls, and radio on "seashell earbuds" to human interaction, has overdosed on sleeping pills. The callous behavior of the paramedics makes him feel very alienated, while his wife's emptiness disturbs and angers him.
- Third, he has a call to go to a house owned by an old woman who hid away a library of books. Rather than be led out of the house before it is burned, she decides to set the fire herself, and burns alive with her books.
- Fourth, he remembers a chance meeting he had one year previously with an old man in the park, who is later identified as an English professor. Montag, who has secretly been hiding books in his own house, eventually makes contact with this man, named Faber.

Over the course of the novel, Montag becomes increasingly disillusioned with the hedonistic, anti-intellectual society around him. Bradbury emphasizes that the U.S. government, in burning books, is merely expressing the will of a people whose short attention spans, indifference, and hedonism have gradually eroded any semblance of intellectualism from public life. Schools no longer teach the humanities, children are casually violent, and adults are constantly distracted by "seashells" (small audio devices resembling earbuds) and insipid television programs displayed on wall-sized screens. Authors and readers are regarded as pretentious and dangerous to the well-being of society. He meets many characters that change his outlook on life such as Clarisse and Faber.

After an incident where Montag tries to read a poem to his wife's friends when they are visiting, his wife denounces their house as book-possessing. Montag's fire chief, Beatty, tries to persuade him that books are evil, and urges him to return to the unthinking fireman mentality, but Montag refuses.

After the firehouse receives an alert, Beatty drives the fire truck to the location, which is Montag's house. Beatty forces Montag to set fire to his own house. After Montag is finished, Beatty confronts Montag and discovers the device he uses to communicate with Faber. After Beatty vows to track down who was on the other line, Montag turns the fire hose on Beatty and burns him to death.

He flees through the city streets to Faber's house, with another firehouse's mechanical hound and television network helicopters in hot pursuit. When he arrives at Faber's home, the old man tells Montag of vagabond book-lovers in the countryside. Montag then escapes to a local river, floats downstream and meets a group of older men who, to Montag's astonishment, have memorized entire books, preserving them orally until the law against books is overturned. The war begins. Montag watches helplessly as jet bombers fly overhead and attack the city with nuclear weapons.

== In other media ==
Montag's fate is expanded on in the semi-canonical 1984 video game Fahrenheit 451, which acts as a sequel to the novel. In the game, Montag has continued to evade and resist the Firemen for over five years after the end of the novel and is sent on a mission to break into New York Library and transmit its microcassette archive to the Underground. He succeeds and reunites with Clarisse (who is alive in this version) during the process; however, the Firemen storm the building and immolate them both.

In the 1998 Strategy game StarCraft, a firebat hero is named Guy Montag.

== Historical notes ==
- Montag is portrayed by Oskar Werner in the 1966 film version.
- Montag is portrayed by Michael B. Jordan in the 2018 television film version.
- In the afterword of the 2003 fiftieth anniversary edition of the book, Bradbury states that only upon later reflection of his work did he realize he had subconsciously named Montag after a paper company, making him the counterpart to Faber, which is also the name of a pencil manufacturer.
