= List of R.O.D the TV episodes =

This is a list of episodes of the 26-episode anime series R.O.D the TV animated by J.C.Staff, produced by Aniplex, directed by Koji Masunari, scripted by Hideyuki Kurata and licensed internationally by Aniplex of America (previously Geneon Entertainment) and Madman Entertainment. The series is the sequel to the Read or Die OVA (although the repercussions of the events in that story are not felt until halfway through the series). The series follows the lives of Nenene, Michelle, Maggie and Anita, who battle the sinister Dokusensha and the British Library Special Operations Division.

The series first aired its two episodes on September 1, 2003, and concluded with the last two episodes on March 16, 2004.

Half of the episode titles are based on novels of the same name.

== Episodes ==
No.	Title	Original release date
1	"The Papers Have Landed"; Transliteration: "Kami wa maiorita" (Japanese: 紙は舞い降りた)	September 1, 2003
Nenene Sumiregawa, a famous Japanese author travels to Hong Kong for a book signing. She meets Michelle and Maggie, two of the Paper Sisters, who have been hired to be her local guides. When Nenene's hotel suite is bombed, the Paper Sisters volunteer to help protect her. She spends the night at the Paper Sisters' apartment after meeting Anita, the third Paper Sister. A jealous rival holds her hostage at her book signing the next day, but he is foiled by the three Paper Sisters. Nenene is excited to see their master of paper techniques, but is disappointed to learn they have no connection to her friend, Yomiko Readman, who has been missing for four years. When Nenene is attacked on her way home to Japan by another rival, the Paper Sisters follow and rescue her.
2	"Rise Up, Oh Dregs of Humanity"; Transliteration: "Dame ningen domo atsumare" (Japanese: ダメ人間ども集まれ)	September 1, 2003
Nenene's editor Lee Linho hires the Paper Sisters to remain in Japan to look after Nenene. However, after fighting over money woes, they decide to pay Nenene a visit, quickly imposing on her hospitality as well as breaking her television. They use Lee's deposit money on their new apartment to replace Nenene's television, but this leaves them homeless, so Michelle concocts an overly complicated scheme to guilt Nenene into taking them in. While the plan initially fails, Nenene eventually repents and allows them to live with her. Meanwhile, on the news, Joseph "Joker" Carpenter is seen with United States President Cole.
3	"Let's Meet in Jinbocho"; Transliteration: "Jinbōchō de aimashō" (Japanese: 神保町で逢いましょう)	September 16, 2003
When Nenene wanders off without her bodyguards, the Sisters follow her to Jinbocho. Michelle quickly forgets her mission and enters a shopping frenzy, while Maggie passes out from the excitement of being surrounded by all the bookstores. Anita manages to find Nenene, following her to the underground store, Toto Books, where she meet a strange young boy named Junior. Nenene and Anita drop books off at Yomiko's apartment and discuss Anita's aversion to books. Meanwhile, Michelle has bought so many books that the Jinbocho store owners start a rumor that Yomiko Readman has returned.
4	"The Seventh Grade Course"; Transliteration: "Chūichi kōsu" (Japanese: 中一コース)	September 16, 2003
Nenene insists Anita go to school, and so Anita enters the local seventh grade class. She meets and befriends the girls in her class, including the shy Hisami Hishishii. Anita ends up joining the library club to hang out with Hisami. During their chat, an English man named Richard shows up, trying to hide a book from an unseen assailant. When Richard is shot, he passes the book to Anita, and the untangible attacker turns on her. The attack is driven away when Michelle unexpectedly appears at school to check up on Anita, and though Anita's rival classmate Tohru Okahara witnesses part of the fight, he chooses not to confront her about it. In the meantime, Nenene sneaks away to follow a lead on the missing Yomiko, and the Paper Sisters receive a job order from Dokusensha.
5	"They Shout"; Transliteration: "Yatsura wa sawaideiru" (Japanese: やつらは騒いでいる)	October 1, 2003
The Paper Sisters travel to Romania to retrieve a book stolen during the fire at the British Library four years ago. While attempting to infiltrate Professor Webber's castle, their powers are partially stripped by a strange force surrounding the castle, and they are attacked by strange animals. Maggie grows excessively depressed while Anita grows extremely frustrated and begins to pick fights with her sisters, then runs off. The three finally find Professor Webber's central chambers, where they discover he has been weakening their abilities and playing on their emotional weaknesses with the influence of ultrasonic and subsonic waves. Michelle finds herself partially immune because of her general sense of calm, and the Paper Sisters find a way to defeat the sonic attacks. Anita kills Webber and they flee. An already injured Maggie protects Anita from Webber's vengeful servant Irving, and Dokusensha agents Mr. Kim and Sonny Wong help the Paper Sisters escape the castle.
6	"The Right Stuff"; Transliteration: "Raito sutaffu" (Japanese: ライトスタッフ)	October 1, 2003
Anita's school day routine is shaken when her teacher announces the annual family visitation day, and she tries to keep the knowledge of the day from her sisters, planning to skip class herself. She runs into Junior, who has been disguising himself as a student, searching for the book Anita hid in the library. When the household learns Anita has kept the family visitation day as well as the accompanying required book report both a secret, Maggie and Michelle discuss Anita's aversion to books and reveals they are adopted, not blood related. Although Anita doesn't expect her family to appear for the family visitation day, she decides to do a book report anyway, reading her first book in a long time, entitled "Midnight Liberation Zone" by Nenene Sumiregawa.
7	"In a Grove"; Transliteration: "Yabu no naka" (Japanese: 薮の中)	October 16, 2003
The Paper Sisters arrive in a small town searching for a retired actor named John Smith, who possesses one of the British Library books. However, after Michelle's disappearance in a cafe, Maggie is arrested, accused of killing her. Anita is left alone and then nearly attacked by someone posing as Michelle. While Maggie breaks out of jail, Michelle frees herself from a coffin and finds herself in a writer's apartment, where she learns about Smith. She figures out who Smith is and forces him to release her sisters and give up the book.
8	"Seduced by the Night"; Transliteration: "Yoru ni madowasarete" (Japanese: 夜に惑わされて)	October 16, 2003
Every night, the school library has been trashed, and Anita's classmates blame the intrusion on a poltergeist. They decide to stay in the library overnight to investigate. Anita invites Junior to the ghost hunt, and the "ghost" fails to make an appearance. The students have fun partying in the library regardless, and Tohru finds a moment alone to try and confess his feelings to Hisami. Meanwhile, Anita finds Junior alone and keeps him company while they watch the stars. Anita reveals the location of the hidden book to Junior. However, after having his moment of friendship with Anita and meeting Michelle, Junior reports to Wendy Earhart, Joker's secretary, that he was unable to find the book.
9	"Heart of Darkness"; Transliteration: "Yami no oku" (Japanese: 闇の奥)	November 1, 2003
Dokusensha sends the Paper Sisters to a hot springs resort in order to retrieve another British Library artifact, known as "the Key," from archaeologist and special agent Alice Alice Arquette. Coincidentally, Nenene is at the same location for a school reunion/wedding reception. Arquette has hired Drake Anderson as her bodyguard, and they face-off against the Paper Sisters at the resort cafe, where Nenene discovers them. The writer follows the Paper Sisters while they chase Alice and Drake into a cave. The Paper Sisters find themselves at a standoff with Drake while Alice retrieves the Key. Suddenly, Wong arrives and brutally slaughters Alice. Even though the Paper Sisters are supposed to be on the same side as Wong, they protect Drake, disgusted by Wong's brutality. Junior appears, masked, and steals the Key. Drake floods the cave and helps the Paper Sisters and Nenene escape. The Paper Sisters receive only partial payment for their "assistance" to Wong, which they refuse.
10	"A Christmas Carol"; Transliteration: "Kurisumasu kyaroru" (Japanese: クリスマス･キャロル)	November 1, 2003
Nenene receives two Christmas party invitations, the first of which she discards as being sent by a lunatic. The Paper Sisters talk her into accepting the second invitation, to the 10th annual Young Writer's Award reception, being that Nenene had been the inaugural recipient of the reward. After dodging loopy authors and snotty editors, Nenene announces she has begun work on her new novel. When they return home, the Paper Sisters reveal they sent the first invitation: a "birthday" party for the three of them. They tell Nenene about their first meeting, two years ago to the day, in an abandoned church in Hong Kong. The young Dokusensha agents, Michelle and Maggie, took in Anita, whom they found starving in the church. After the Paper Sisters fall asleep, Nenene gets to working on her novel.
11	"Goodbye Japan"; Transliteration: "Sayonara Nippon" (Japanese: さよならにっぽん)	November 16, 2003
With Nenene safe and no longer suffering writer's block, Linho terminates the Sisters' employment, so they must prepare to go back to Hong Kong. A depressed Anita finds it difficult to say goodbye to her classmates, especially Hisami. When Hisami avoids Anita's farewell party, Tohru convinces Hisami to return, and Anita and Hisami make their proper farewells to each other at last. Because Anita is leaving, Junior decides to retrieve Richard's book. Nenene gives the Paper Sisters a standing invitation to visit her in Tokyo any time, and will accompany them to Hong Kong before they say goodbye. When they arrive at their Hong Kong apartment, a horde of Dokusensha soldiers ambush them, along with Linho, preparing to capture Nenene.
12	"Twilight of the Papers, Part I"; Transliteration: "Kamigami no tasogare" (Japanese: 紙々の黄昏)	November 16, 2003
Linho and his soldiers subdue the Paper Sisters and kidnap Nenene, leaving the Sisters with suitcases full of money to pay them for their work and convince them to leave Dokusensha alone. Meanwhile, Dokusensha attempts to forcibly implant their Perfect Language into Nenene's mind, which she resists at the cost of incredible pain. The Sisters decide to risk making a "world full of enemies" and assault Dokusensha in order to rescue Nenene. The Paper Sisters do fine until they encounter Wong, a more powerful Paper Master than the three of them combined.
13	"Twilight of the Papers, Part II"; Transliteration: "Zoku – Kamigami no tasogare" (Japanese: 続･紙々の黄昏)	December 1, 2003
Michelle and Anita leave Maggie behind to hold Wong's attention while they continue the search for Nenene. When the only way to get to Nenene can be traversed by the smaller Anita, Anita has to continue on alone. Meanwhile, Wendy and Joker have taken advantage of the distraction to retrieve the special books, while Junior plants bombs underneath the massive skyscrapers comprising the headquarters. Anita manages to rescue Nenene, and though Linho almost manages to subdue Anita, he repents and lets the two escape, at the cost of his own life. The bombs go off, Maggie escapes from Wong, who falls into the exploding building, and the protagonists are eventually reunited. However, such was the damage of the explosion that a large portion of Hong Kong Island sinks along with Dokusensha's headquarters.
14	"Forest of Paper Leaves (or "Paper Leaf Wood")"; Transliteration: "Kami ha no mori" (Japanese: 紙葉の森)	December 1, 2003
Back in Tokyo, a familiar female voice leaves a brief message on Nenene's answering machine. Wendy writes a report about the chronology of Mr. Gentleman and the British Library, explaining their intention to resurrect Mr. Gentleman using the special books they've collected. She recounts the I-Jin Incident and reveals that the I-Jin were originally created by the British Library. She also compares Yomiko Readman and the Paper Sisters. During Wendy's work break, Junior makes Wendy a special birthday dinner, and they share a rare friendly moment together. Later, Joker declares the collapse of Dokusensha, and he tells Wendy to look up a girl with glasses.
15	"In the Gray Light of the Abyss"; Transliteration: "Kuraki chi no soko de" (Japanese: 仄暗き地の底で)	December 16, 2003
The protagonists return to Tokyo, but quickly find themselves on the run, having been accused of causing the explosions in Hong Kong. After discovering Dokusensha orders naming Yomiko Readman as the possessor of the final Gentleman Book, the "Book of the All Seeing Eye," the four manage to track Yomiko down to the National Diet Library, where she is hiding with an amnesiac named Nancy Makuhari. Yomiko is reluctant to greet a tearful Nenene and refuses to help them, but Joker enters in force, demanding Yomiko turn over the book to him.
16	"Fahrenheit 451"; Transliteration: "Kashi yon-go-ichi" (Japanese: 華氏四五一)	December 16, 2003
Joker learns why it's foolish to attack four Paper Masters inside a library, and while the six women escape, Joker orders Wendy to execute plan "Fahrenheit 451". The British Library collects all the books in Jinbocho into a massive pile and sets them on fire. Yomiko falls into despair as she watches her beloved books burn while Anita, as she looks at the burning books, flashes back to her memory of the mysterious silhouette in the fire she remembers from her childhood. The silhouette she remembers bears a striking resemblance to Yomiko standing before the flames in Jinbocho.
17	"Sweet Home"; Transliteration: "Suiito hōmu" (Japanese: スイートホーム)	January 1, 2004
Wendy faces down Yomiko and friends and shoots Yomiko. Drake helps everyone escape and they retreat to the home of Yomiko's parents in the mountains of Saitama. That night, Junior shows up and tries to steal the book, but Nancy stops him, whose phasing ability will not work on her. When he points his gun at her, Yomiko begs him not to shoot and reveals that Nancy is Junior's mother. Stunned and confused, Junior's gun goes off.
18	"Confession"; Transliteration: "Kokuhaku" (Japanese: 告白)	January 1, 2004
After Michelle keeps him from shooting Nancy, Junior finds himself temporarily allied with the heroes, as they try to figure out the truth of the matters at hand. Yomiko hides in the attic with Nancy, too upset to talk, but later she finds the courage to confesses to the others about why she lied to Nancy about the death of Junior. She explains that she was distraught after learning that the British Library planned to use Junior as the new vessel as the new Mr. Gentleman, causing Yomiko to run into hiding with Nancy after being unable to save Junior. An upset Junior phases into the "Book of the All Seeing Eye" and projects a holographic recording of the events leading up to the fire. It is revealed that Yomiko temporarily lost control of herself and caused an enormous fire at the British Library. This also reminds Anita of this event, when she saw Yumiko from within the flames.
19	"The Family Game"; Transliteration: "Kazoku geimu" (Japanese: 家族ゲーム)	February 1, 2004
Anita runs off into the woods, being traumatized from the holographic projection of her past. Michelle and Maggie go look for her to comfort her. Meanwhile, Yomiko explains the event in detail to Nenene, Nancy, Junior, and Drake. During the night, a British Library agent known as the Mirror Man infiltrates the house, forcing Junior to return to duty. The next morning, everyone except Yomiko and Anita has gone missing. Taking the appearance of Nenene, the Mirror Man tricks them and steals the book. However, Yomiko and Anita escape his trap, preparing to fight back.
20	"Bonjour tristesse (French: Hello Sadness)"; Transliteration: "Kanashimi yo konnichiwa" (Japanese: 悲しみよこんにちは)	February 1, 2004
Having defeated the Mirror Man and his followers, Anita and Yomiko pursue Junior, and Yomiko shows Anita how to fly her paper airplane. Junior rides in a helicopter with the drugged members of the group and threatens the pilot. The helicopter explodes when Anita and Yomiko catch up with the others. Filled with rage and despair, Anita blames the entire situation on Yomiko, and throws the book into the wreckage of the helicopter. She returns to her old school, meets Hisami to ask her for help, but Hisami does not recognize her.
21	"D.O.D -DREAM OR DIE-"	February 16, 2004
Anita returns to her school, where everyone's behavior just seems slightly different. Wendy approaches Anita, offering Anita a chance to have her memory restored just like her classmates, in exchange for freedom and a few tissue samples. Anita decides she cannot live a lie and returns to Nenene's apartment, where she runs into a tearful Yomiko. Despite Anita's resentment, she agrees to team up with Yomiko to sabotage the Jinbocho satellite dish and capture Joker. They take him hostage and fly back to Saitama to rescue Michelle, Nancy, and Drake, who are surrounded by British Library troops.
22	"Seize"; Transliteration: "Dasshu" (Japanese: 奪取)	February 16, 2004
Anita and Yomiko reunite with the others, forcing the British Library soldiers into a stand off while they hold Joker prisoner. Meanwhile, Maggie and Nenene have taken refuge in a hotel, but Wendy finds them and tricks Maggie into believing Anita's life is in danger, forcing her to turn over Nenene in exchange for a chance to save Anita. Nenene goes willingly in order to spare Maggie any unnecessary grief.
23	"Lie to Me"; Transliteration: "Uso, soshite chinmoku" (Japanese: 嘘, そして沈黙)	March 1, 2004
Wendy prepares to exchange Nenene for Joker. In the meantime, Joker reveals to Anita that she was a test tube baby born in the British Library and tells her that Michelle and Maggie were brainwashed to take her in. Junior tells Michelle something similar, indicating Michelle had been altered to become a Paper Master, and Maggie reads a book given to her by Wendy containing a similar report. Wendy uses the Mirror Man to make the hostage exchange go in her favor and rescues Joker. However, Anita, Yomiko, Nancy, and Drake manage to escape regardless. Days later, Joker announces the plan of the British Library to the world.
24	"You Know Me"; Transliteration: "Kimi ga boku o shitteru" (Japanese: 君が僕を知ってる)	March 1, 2004
Yomiko and the others leave for London to rescue Nenene and stop Joker, but a distraught Anita remains behind. Anita returns to Nenene's apartment only to find Maggie and Michelle, and she tries to leave, declaring their life a lie. Michelle and Maggie help her realize that while they may have false memories of their past, the life they now share is a reality. The newly reformed Paper Sisters fly to the United Kingdom only to find out that the British Library turned the country into a mythical nineteenth century landscape.
25	"Not a Big Problem" (Japanese: たいした問題じゃない ISBN 9784257916987)	March 16, 2004
The Paper Sisters meet with Yomiko and the others, and they spend a week searching for the secret location of the British Library. They finally deduce the right place and discover Mr. Kim, working for the British Library, as they force him to help them infiltrate the headquarters. They split into three groups to rescue Nenene and Junior as well as capture Joker. The Paper Sisters successfully find Nenene, but Yomiko loses her nerve when facing down Joker. In the Special Operations base, Wendy is forced to hook Junior into the Gentleman Resurrection machine. While she is willing to do this, she tells him that if part of his own identity survives he should take revenge on her.
26	"From There On..."; Transliteration: "Sorekara" (Japanese: それから ja:それから)	March 16, 2004
With Nenene, Yomiko, and the Paper Sisters captured, the resurrection project begins, and the heroes attempt to talk Joker and Wendy out of their plan. Drake creates a distraction while Nancy infiltrates the Resurrection Chamber to free Junior. Nenene reveals she had hidden her manuscript under her shirt, providing ammunition for the Paper Masters, and the fight very quickly turns to their favor. Junior transfers part of the energies of Mr. Gentleman into Joker's mind, causing him to age rapidly and leaving him catatonic. As Junior is freed from the key of Mr. Gentleman, the resurrection device attaches itself to Anita and nearly kills her. Ultimately, the project fails, the British Library collapses, sending its members on the run. Wendy hides in the country to nurse Joker. Everyone returns to their daily lives - Yomiko and Nenene shop in Jinbocho, Michelle takes care of Junior at Yomiko's house in Saitama, Drake visits his daughter, Maggie and Anita still live at Nenene's house, and Anita attends school with her friends. The final scene displays Maggie, Anita and Michelle's initials carved unto the statue of the Virgin Mary in the Chapel where the three met, revealing that their memories were never fabricated and real all along.
