= Oskar Werner =

Austrian actor (1922–1984)

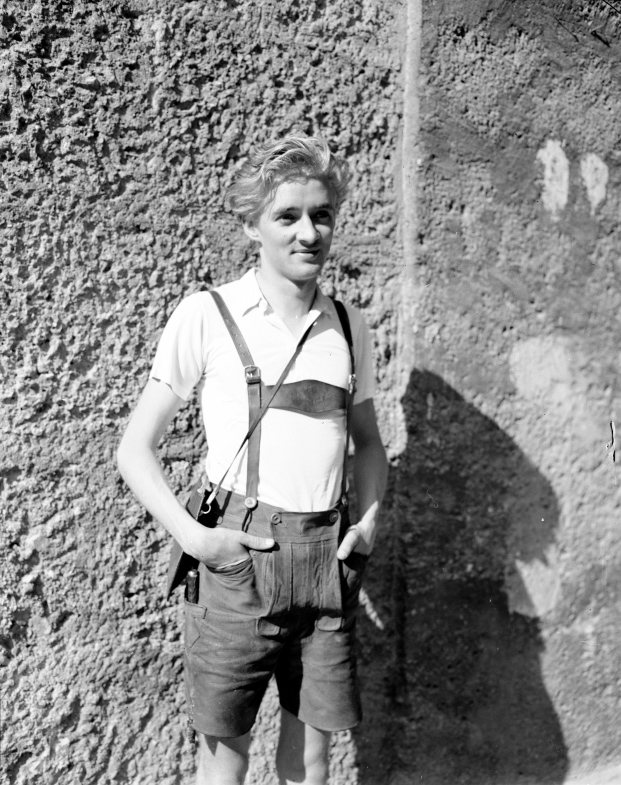
- Werner in 1947
- Born: Oskar Josef Bschließmayer; 13 November 1922; Vienna, Austria
- Died: 23 October 1984 (aged 61); Marburg an der Lahn, Hesse, West Germany
- Resting place: Triesen, Liechtenstein
- Years active: 1939–1984
- Spouses: Elisabeth Kallina (m. 1944; div. 1952) Anne Power (m. 1954; div. 1968)
- Partner: Diana Bennett Wanger (1965–1969)
- Children: 2

Oskar Werner (German: [ˈɔskaʁ ˈvɛʁnɐ]; born Oskar Josef Bschließmayer; 13 November 1922 – 23 October 1984) was an Austrian stage and cinema actor who reached international fame. His most prominent roles include two 1965 films, The Spy Who Came In from the Cold and Ship of Fools. For the former, Werner won a Golden Globe Award. For the latter, Werner received an Oscar nomination. Other notable films include Decision Before Dawn (1951), Lola Montès (1955), Jules and Jim (1962), Fahrenheit 451 (1966), The Shoes of the Fisherman (1968), and Voyage of the Damned (1976).

Werner accepted both stage and film roles throughout his career. He won a New York Film Critics Circle Award, a Golden Globe Award for Best Supporting Actor and was nominated two additional Golden Globes, as well as two BAFTA Awards, and an Academy Award, among other honors.

== Early life ==
Born in Vienna, Werner spent much of his childhood in the care of his grandmother, who entertained him with stories about the Burgtheater, the Austrian state theatre, where he was accepted at the age of 18 by Lothar Müthel. He was the youngest person to receive this recognition. He made his theatre debut using the stage name Oskar Werner in October 1941.

In December 1941, Werner was drafted into the Deutsche Wehrmacht. As a pacifist and staunch opponent of National Socialism, he was determined to avoid advancement in the army:

So many officers had been killed on the Russian front that they needed replacements desperately. And, I was for them the embodiment of the Aryan type. But I am a pacifist. I didn't want any responsibility, so I behaved stupidly. I fell from my horse and made mistakes reading the range finders on the cannon, and finally, they kicked me out of training school.

He was assigned to peeling potatoes and cleaning latrines instead of being sent to the Eastern Front. In 1944, he secretly married actress Elisabeth Kallina, who was half Jewish.

They had a daughter Eleanore. That December, he deserted the Wehrmacht and fled with his wife and daughter to the Wienerwald (Vienna Woods), where they remained in hiding until the end of the war. He would later remember, "The artillery fire was constant for two and a half days. The shells hit all around our little hut and it was shaking like a leaf ... We knew that to go out there would be suicide, but it was better than to have to wait for execution."

== Career ==
=== Early ===
Werner returned to the Burgtheater and acted in productions at the Raimund Theater and the Theater in der Josefstadt, frequently playing character roles. He made his film debut in Der Engel mit der Posaune, directed by Karl Hartl, in 1948. The following year he portrayed Ludwig van Beethoven's nephew Karl in Eroica.

In 1950, Werner journeyed to the United Kingdom to reprise the role he had played in Der Engel mit der Posaune in its English-language version The Angel with the Trumpet, directed by Anthony Bushell. He and his wife divorced at about this time but remained friends. He appeared in a few more German-Austrian films before going to Hollywood for a lead role in the 20th Century Fox war film Decision Before Dawn.

When the subsequent roles promised by the studio failed to materialize, he returned to Europe and settled in Triesen, Liechtenstein in a home he designed and built with a friend. He returned to the stage and performed in Hamlet, Danton's Death, Henry IV, Henry V, Torquato Tasso, and Becket.

After a period of inactivity in films, Werner appeared in five in 1955, including Mozart, in which he played the title role, and Lola Montès, directed by Max Ophüls. It was not until 1962, when he appeared in Jules and Jim, that he began to draw critical acclaim and international recognition.

=== Later ===
Werner's portrayal of the philosophical Dr. Schumann in the 1965 film Ship of Fools won him the New York Film Critics Circle Award for Best Actor and nominations for the Academy Award for Best Actor, the Golden Globe Award for Best Actor – Motion Picture Drama, and the BAFTA Award for Best Foreign Actor. His portrayal of Fiedler in The Spy Who Came In from the Cold (1965) won him the Golden Globe Award for Best Supporting Actor – Motion Picture and his second BAFTA nomination.

In 1966, he played a book-burning fireman Guy Montag who rebels against a controlled society in François Truffaut's Fahrenheit 451 by Ray Bradbury. He played an orchestra conductor in Interlude and a Vatican priest loosely based on Pierre Teilhard de Chardin in The Shoes of the Fisherman in 1968.

In the early 1970s, Werner returned to the stage and spent time traveling in Israel, Italy, Malta, France, and the United States. He appeared in the episode of Columbo titled "Playback" in 1975, and the following year made his final screen appearance in Voyage of the Damned, for which he received another Golden Globe nomination. He had an uncredited role as a Wehrmacht Officer in the 1974 film The Odessa File.

Werner was also set to appear in Michael Cimino's love triangle drama Perfect Strangers alongside Roy Scheider and Romy Schneider. The film was two weeks into preproduction shooting when it was halted, due to a lot of political machinations at the studio.

His last stage appearance was in a production of The Prince of Homburg in 1983, and he made his last public appearance in 1984 at the Mozart Hall in Salzburg ten days before his death.

== Personal life ==
In 1944, while serving in the Wehrmacht, Werner secretly married actress Elisabeth Kallina, who was half Jewish. The couple had a daughter, Eleanore. They divorced in 1952. In 1954, he married Anne Power, the daughter of French actress Annabella and the adopted daughter of Tyrone Power. They divorced in 1968. From 1965 to 1969, Werner was in a relationship with Diana Bennett Wanger, daughter of actress Joan Bennett, and they had one son, Felix Florian Werner, born 1966.

Werner was an alcoholic, which contributed heavily to the decline of his health and career. He was cast in Stanley Kubrick's Barry Lyndon as Captain Potzdorf then replaced after a week, due to his drinking, by Hardy Krüger.

On 22 October 1984, he cancelled a reading at the Hotel Europäischer Hof in Marburg an der Lahn, Germany, feeling ill. He was found dead of a heart attack the following morning, at 61. He is buried in Liechtenstein.

== Filmography and television work ==
Year	Title	Role	Notes
1938	Geld fällt vom Himmel		
1939	Hotel Sacher	Liftboy	
1939	Linen from Ireland	Hotelpage	Uncredited
1948	The Angel with the Trumpet	Hermann Alt	
1949	Eroica	Karl van Beethoven	
1950	The Angel with the Trumpet	Herman Alt	
1951	Das gestohlene Jahr	Peter Brück	
1951	Call Over the Air	Der Student	
1951	The Wonder Kid	Rudi	
1951	Ein Lächeln im Sturm	Francois Mercier	
1951	Decision Before Dawn	Cpl. Karl "Happy" Maurer	First American film.
1955	The Last Ten Days	Hauptmann Wüst	
1955	Espionage	Lt. Zeno von Baumgarten	
1955	Mozart	Wolfgang Amadeus Mozart	
1955	Lola Montès	Student	
1958	Ein gewisser Judas	Judas	TV movie
1962	Jules and Jim	Jules	
1964	Torquato Tasso	Torquato Tasso	TV movie
1965	The Spy Who Came In from the Cold	Fiedler	Golden Globe Award for Best Supporting Actor – Motion Picture; Nominated–BAFTA Award for Best Actor in a Leading Role
1965	Ship of Fools	Dr. Schumann	New York Film Critics Circle Award for Best Actor; Nominated–Academy Award for Best Actor; Nominated–BAFTA Award for Best Actor in a Leading Role; Nominated–Golden Globe Award for Best Actor – Motion Picture Drama
1966	Fahrenheit 451	Guy Montag	
1968	Interlude	Stefan Zelter	
1968	The Shoes of the Fisherman	Fr. David Telemond	
1975	Columbo	Harold Van Wick	Episode: "Playback"
1976	Voyage of the Damned	Professor Egon Kreisler	Nominated–Golden Globe Award for Best Supporting Actor – Motion Picture

== See also ==
- List of Austrian film actors
- List of German Academy Award winners and nominees
- List of Liechtensteiners
- List of people from Vienna
