= Fahrenheit 451 (video game) =

1984 video game

- Developers: Byron Preiss Video Productions; Trillium
- Publisher: Trillium
- Designers: Lee Jacknow; Robert Strong
- Programmer: Michael P. Meyer
- Artists: Robert Strong; Brian Humphrey
- Writers: Len Neufeld; Ray Bradbury
- Platforms: Apple II, Atari ST, Commodore 64, MS-DOS, Mac, MSX
- Release: 1984
- Genre: Interactive fiction
- Mode: Single-player

Fahrenheit 451 is an interactive fiction game released in 1984 based on the 1953 novel of the same name by Ray Bradbury. Originally released by software company Trillium, it was re-released in 1985 under the company's new name Telarium.

The player's goal is to help Guy Montag, the main character from the novel, to evade the authorities and make contact with an underground movement.

== Development ==
Bradbury himself contributed to the game (Note: Ray Bradbury, from the game package blurb: "I'm thrilled to be participating in the evolution of my Fahrenheit 451 into a computer adventure. For anybody curious about what happens to Montag after the book ends, or about what science fiction software might be, here is an exciting place to start.") by writing the prologue and responses of the game's intelligent computer "Ray".

Working under the aegis of Byron Preiss Visual Publications, the plot of the game was conceived by Byron Preiss and the text was written by Len Neufeld (known for his previous authorship of books in the Be an Interplanetary Spy interactive novel series, also produced by Preiss).

== Plot ==
At the ending of Fahrenheit 451, former Fireman Guy Montag is a fugitive, wanted for murder for killing his supervisor and stealing contraband books. The game takes place five years later. A pointless war has swept across the country, leading to martial law by the Firemen. Now an agent for the literary underground, Montag makes his way to New York. His mission is to break into the heavily guarded New York Public Library on 42nd Street. The books themselves were burned, but the contents had first been transferred to microcassette. The microcassettes need to be retrieved and uploaded into the Underground's information network. Along the way, he discovers that Clarisse McClellan, the young woman who inspired him to rebellion, is still alive.

Challenges for the player involve finding ways to alter one's appearance, fingerprints, and "chemindex" (body chemistry) in order to evade detection. Other issues arise in finding food to eat and safe places to rest. The player must also make contact with members of the Underground hiding in the city, through the use of a lighter and literary quotations.

In the end, Montag is able to break into the Central Library and meet up with Clarisse. The microcassettes are found and transmitted on the information network to resistance cells all over the world. While Montag and Clarisse achieve victory in saving the extensive collection of literature, it costs them their lives as firemen storm the office after the last cassette is transmitted, immolating them both.

== Release ==
The game was released in 1984 for the Apple II, Commodore 64, MS-DOS, and Tandy platforms; for the Mac in 1985; and for the Atari ST and MSX systems in 1986.

== Reception ==
A contemporary review in Games magazine was positive, with minor technical and interface criticisms, writing, "The hours you spend on this imaginary Fifth Avenue will be just as harrowing as dodging taxis on the real thing, but much more enjoyable." Another review praised the "gripping prose" and the "unique approach of obtaining and using literary quotations." German reviewers appreciated the complexity of the plot, the graphics, and the large number of scenes and non-fictional characters.

In 1993, a German study about the history of interactive fiction described Fahrenheit 451 as a highly complex, interactive computer fairy tale. It referred to the adventure as a play with classic literature quotations.
