= Fahrenheit 451 =

1953 dystopian novel by Ray Bradbury

- First edition cover (clothbound)
- Author: Ray Bradbury
- Illustrator: Joseph Mugnaini
- Language: English
- Genre: Dystopian
- Published: 1953-10-19 (Ballantine Books)
- Publication place: United States
- Pages: 156
- ISBN: 978-0-7432-4722-1 (current cover edition)
- OCLC: 53101079
- Dewey Decimal: 813.54 22
- LC Class: PS3503.R167 F3 2003

Fahrenheit 451 is a 1953 dystopian novel by American writer Ray Bradbury. It presents a future American society where books have been outlawed and "firemen" burn any that are found. The novel follows the viewpoint of Guy Montag, a fireman who becomes disillusioned with his role of censoring literature and destroying knowledge, eventually quitting his job and committing himself to the preservation of literary and cultural writings.

Fahrenheit 451 was written by Bradbury during the Second Red Scare and the McCarthy era, inspired by the book burnings in Nazi Germany and by ideological repression in the Soviet Union. Bradbury said his motivation for writing the novel had changed multiple times. In a 1956 radio interview, Bradbury said that he wrote the book because of his concerns about the threat of burning books in the United States. In later years, he described the book as a commentary on how mass media reduces interest in reading literature. In a 1994 interview, Bradbury cited political correctness as an allegory for the censorship in the book, calling it "the real enemy these days" and labeling it as "thought control and freedom of speech control".

The writing and theme within Fahrenheit 451 was explored by Bradbury in some of his previous short stories. Between 1947 and 1948, Bradbury wrote "Bright Phoenix", a short story about a librarian who confronts a "Chief Censor", who burns books. An encounter Bradbury had in 1949 with the police inspired him to write the short story "The Pedestrian" in 1951. In "The Pedestrian", a man going for a nighttime walk in his neighborhood is harassed and detained by the police. In the society of "The Pedestrian", citizens are expected to watch television as a leisure activity, a detail that would be included in Fahrenheit 451. Elements of both "Bright Phoenix" and "The Pedestrian" would be combined into The Fireman, a novella published in Galaxy Science Fiction in 1951. Bradbury was urged by Stanley Kauffmann, an editor at Ballantine Books, to make The Fireman into a full novel. Bradbury finished the manuscript for Fahrenheit 451 in 1953, and the novel was published later that year.

Upon its release, Fahrenheit 451 was a critical success, albeit with notable dissenters; the novel's subject matter led to its censorship in apartheid South Africa and various schools in the United States. In 1954, Fahrenheit 451 won the American Academy of Arts and Letters Award in Literature and the Commonwealth Club of California Gold Medal. It later won the Prometheus "Hall of Fame" Award in 1984 and a "Retro" Hugo Award in 2004. Bradbury was honored with a Spoken Word Grammy nomination for his 1976 audiobook version. The novel has been adapted into films, stage plays, and video games. Film adaptations of the novel include a 1966 film directed by François Truffaut starring Oskar Werner as Guy Montag and a 2018 television film directed by Ramin Bahrani starring Michael B. Jordan as Montag, both of which received a mixed critical reception. Bradbury himself published a stage play version in 1979 and helped develop a 1984 interactive fiction video game of the same name as well as a collection of his short stories titled A Pleasure to Burn. Two BBC Radio dramatizations were also produced.

== Historical and biographical context ==
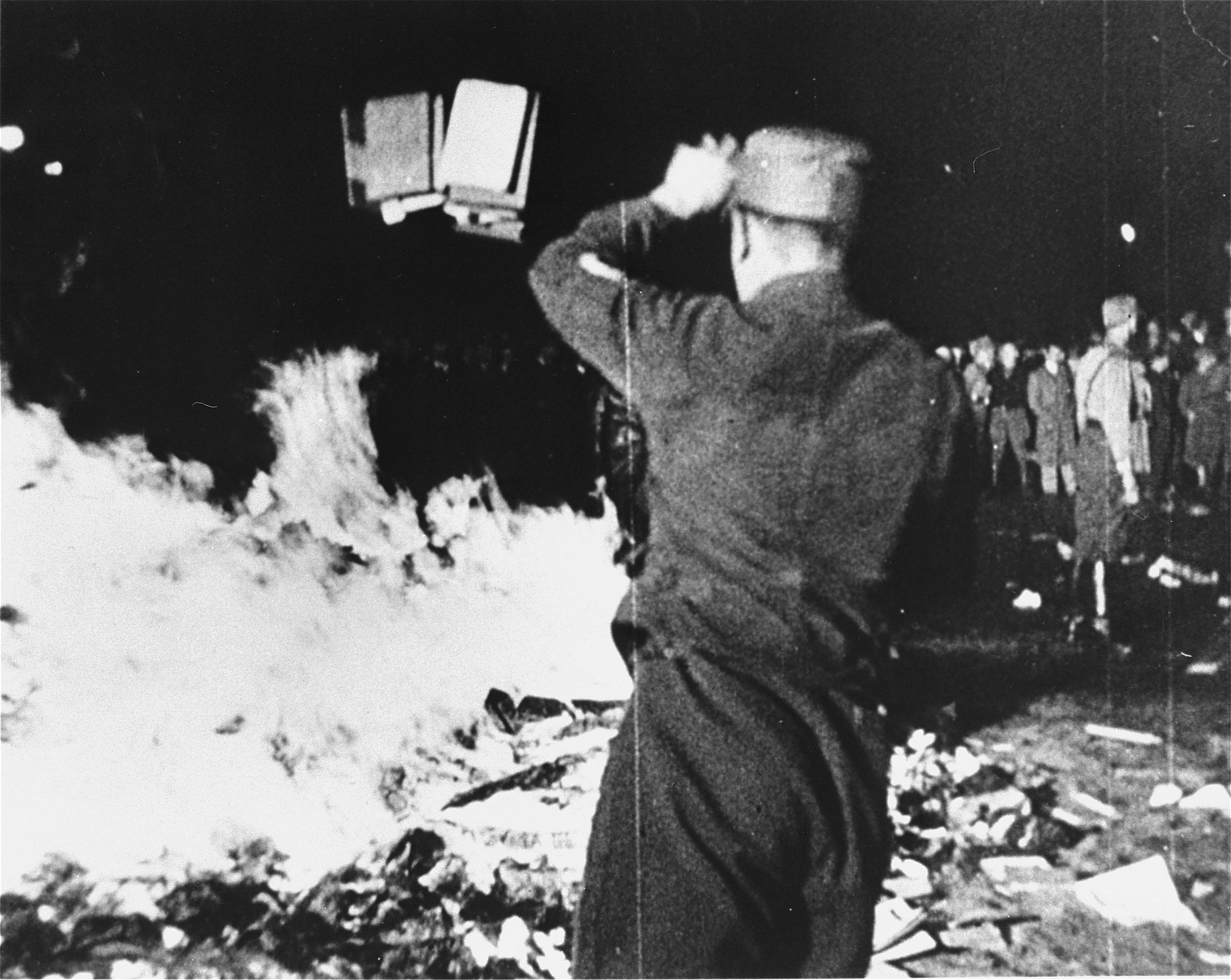
The Nazi book burnings horrified Ray Bradbury and inspired him to write Fahrenheit 451.

The House Un-American Activities Committee (HUAC), formed in 1938 to investigate American citizens and organizations suspected of having communist ties, held hearings in 1947 to investigate alleged communist influence in Hollywood movie-making. The government's interference in the affairs of artists and creative types infuriated Bradbury; he was concerned about the workings of his government, and a late 1949 nighttime encounter with an overzealous police officer would inspire Bradbury to write "The Pedestrian", a short story which would go on to become "The Fireman" and then Fahrenheit 451. The rise of Senator Joseph McCarthy's McCarthyism persecution of accused communists, beginning in 1950, deepened Bradbury's contempt for government overreach.

The Golden Age of Radio occurred between the early 1920s to the late 1950s, during Bradbury's early years, while the transition to the Golden Age of Television began right around the time he started to work on the stories that eventually led to Fahrenheit 451. Bradbury saw these forms of media as a threat to the reading of books, indeed as a threat to society, as he believed they could act as a distraction from important affairs. This contempt for mass media and technology would express itself through Mildred and her friends and is an important theme in the book.

Bradbury's lifelong passion for books began at an early age. After he graduated from high school, his family could not afford for him to attend college, so Bradbury began spending time at the Los Angeles Public Library where he educated himself. As a frequent visitor to his local libraries in the 1920s and 1930s, he recalled his disappointment at the nonexistent stock of popular science fiction novels, like those of H. G. Wells, because at the time they were not deemed literary enough. Between this and learning about the destruction of the Library of Alexandria, a great impression was made on Bradbury about the vulnerability of books to censure and destruction.

Later, as a teenager, Bradbury was horrified by the Nazi book burnings, stating, "When I was fifteen years old, Hitler burned books in the streets of Berlin. And it terrified me". Bradbury was also influenced by Joseph Stalin's campaign of political repression, the Great Purge, in which writers and poets, among many others, were arrested and often executed, stating, "They burned the authors instead of the books."

== Plot summary ==
=== "The Hearth and the Salamander" ===
In a distant future, (Note: During Captain Beatty's recounting of the history of the firemen to Montag, he says, "Out of the nursery into the college and back to the nursery; where there's your intellectual pattern for the past five centuries or more." The text is ambiguous regarding which century he is claiming began this pattern. One interpretation is that he means the 20th century, which would place the novel in at least the 24th century. "The Fireman" novella, which was expanded to become Fahrenheit 451, is set in October 2052.) Guy Montag is a fireman employed to burn outlawed books, along with the houses they are hidden in. One fall night while returning from work, he meets his new neighbor Clarisse McClellan, whose free-thinking ideals and liberating spirit cause him to question his life and perceived happiness. Montag returns home to find that his wife Mildred has overdosed on the sleeping pills she takes every night, and he calls for medical attention. Two EMTs pump her stomach and change her blood. After they leave to rescue another overdose victim, Montag overhears Clarisse and her family talking about their illiterate society. Shortly afterward, Montag's mind is bombarded with Clarisse's subversive thoughts and the memory of Mildred's near-death. Over the next few days, Clarisse meets Montag each night as he walks home. Clarisse's simple pleasures and interests make her an outcast among her peers, and she is forced to go to therapy for her behavior. Montag looks forward to the meetings, but one day, Clarisse goes missing.

In the following days, while he and other firemen are ransacking the book-filled house of an old woman and drenching it in kerosene, Montag steals a book. The woman refuses to leave her house and her books, choosing instead to light a match and burn herself alive. Jarred by the suicide, Montag returns home and hides the book under his pillow. Montag asks Mildred if she has heard anything about Clarisse. She reveals that Clarisse's family moved away after Clarisse was hit by a speeding car and died four days ago. Dismayed by her failure to mention this earlier, Montag uneasily tries to fall asleep. Outside he suspects the presence of "The Mechanical Hound", an eight-legged robotic dog-like creature that resides in the firehouse and aids the firemen in hunting book hoarders.

Montag awakens ill the next morning. Mildred tries to care for her husband but finds herself more involved in the "parlor wall" entertainment in the living room – large televisions filling the walls. Montag suggests he should take a break from being a fireman, and Mildred panics over the thought of losing the house and her parlor wall "family". Captain Beatty, Montag's fire chief, visits Montag to see how he is doing as a fireman. Sensing his concerns, Beatty recounts the history of how books had lost their value and how the firemen were adapted for their current role: over decades, people began to embrace new media (like film and television), sports, and an ever-quickening pace of life. Books were abridged or degraded to accommodate shorter attention spans. At the same time, advances in technology resulted in nearly all buildings being made with fireproof materials, and firemen preventing fires were no longer necessary. The government then instead turned the firemen into officers of society's peace of mind: instead of putting out fires, they were charged with starting them, specifically to burn books, which were condemned as sources of confusing and depressing thoughts that complicated people's lives. After an awkward exchange between Mildred and Montag over the book hidden under his pillow, Beatty becomes suspicious and casually adds a passing threat before leaving; he says that if a fireman had a book, he would be asked to burn it within the following twenty-four hours. If he refused, the other firemen would come and burn it for him. The encounter leaves Montag shaken.

Montag reveals to Mildred that, over the last year, he has accumulated books that are hidden in their ceiling. In a panic, Mildred grabs a book and rushes to throw it in the kitchen incinerator, but Montag subdues her and says they are going to read the books to see if they have value. If they do not, he promises the books will be burned and their lives will return to normal.

=== "The Sieve and the Sand" ===
Mildred refuses to go along with Montag's plan, questioning why she or anyone else should care about books. Montag goes on a rant about Mildred's suicide attempt, Clarisse's disappearance and death, the woman who burned herself, and the imminent war that goes ignored by the masses. He suggests that perhaps the books of the past have messages that can save society from its own destruction. Mildred remains unconvinced.

Conceding that Mildred is a lost cause, Montag needs help to understand the books. He remembers an old man named Faber, an English professor before books were banned, whom he once met in a park. Montag visits Faber's home carrying a copy of the Bible, the book he stole at the woman's house. Once there, after multiple attempts to ask, Montag forces the scared and reluctant Faber into helping him by methodically ripping pages from the Bible. Faber concedes and gives Montag a homemade earpiece communicator so that he can offer constant guidance.

At home, Mildred's friends, Mrs. Bowles and Mrs. Phelps, arrive to watch the "parlor walls". Not interested in this entertainment, Montag turns off the walls and tries to engage the women in meaningful conversation, only for them to reveal just how indifferent, ignorant, and callous they truly are. Enraged, Montag shows them a book of poetry. This confuses the women and alarms Faber, who is listening remotely. Mildred tries to dismiss Montag's actions as a tradition firemen act out once a year: they find an old book and read it as a way to make fun of how silly the past is. Montag proceeds to recite a poem, (Note: Specifically Dover Beach.) causing Mrs. Phelps to cry. The two women leave.

Montag hides his books in the backyard before returning to the firehouse late at night. There, Montag hands Beatty a book to cover for the one he believes Beatty knows he stole the night before, which is tossed into the trash. Beatty reveals that, despite his disillusionment, he was once an enthusiastic reader. A fire alarm sounds and Beatty picks up the address from the dispatcher system. They drive in the fire truck to the unexpected destination: Montag's house.

=== "Burning Bright" ===
Beatty orders Montag to destroy his house with a flamethrower, rather than the more powerful "salamander" that is usually used by the fire team, and tells him that his wife and her friends reported him. Montag watches as Mildred walks out of the house, too traumatized about losing her parlor wall "family" to even acknowledge her husband's existence or the situation going on around her, and catches a taxi. Montag complies, destroying the home piece by piece, but Beatty discovers his earpiece and plans to hunt down Faber. Montag threatens Beatty with the flamethrower and, after Beatty taunts him, Montag burns Beatty alive. As Montag tries to escape the scene, the Mechanical Hound attacks him, managing to inject his leg with an anesthetic. He destroys the Hound with the flamethrower and limps away. While escaping, Montag concludes that Beatty wanted to die a long time ago, having goaded him and provided him with a weapon.

Montag runs towards Faber's house. En route, he crosses a road as a car attempts to run him over, but he manages to evade the vehicle, almost suffering the same fate as Clarisse and losing his knee. Faber urges him to make his way to the countryside and contact a group of exiled book-lovers who live there. Faber plans to leave on a bus heading to St. Louis, Missouri, where he and Montag can rendezvous later. Meanwhile, another Mechanical Hound is released to track down and kill Montag, with news helicopters following it to create a public spectacle. After wiping his scent from around the house in hopes of thwarting the Hound, Montag leaves. He escapes the manhunt by wading into a river and floating downstream, where he meets the book-lovers. They predicted Montag's arrival while watching the TV.

The drifters are all former intellectuals. They have each memorized books should the day arrive that society comes to an end, with the survivors learning to embrace the literature of the past. Wanting to contribute to the group, Montag finds that he partially memorized the Book of Ecclesiastes, discovering that the group has a special way of unlocking photographic memory. While discussing their learnings, Montag and the group watch helplessly as bombers fly overhead and annihilate the city with nuclear weapons: the war has begun and ended in the same night. While Faber would have left on the early bus, everyone else (possibly including Mildred) is killed. Injured and dirtied, Montag and the group manage to survive the shockwave.

When the war is over, the exiles return to the city to rebuild society.

== Characters ==
- Guy Montag is the protagonist and a fireman who presents the dystopian world in which he lives first through the eyes of a worker loyal to it, then as a man in conflict about it, and eventually as someone resolved to be free of it. Throughout most of the book, Montag lacks knowledge and believes only what he hears. Clarisse McClellan inspires Montag's change, even though they do not know each other for very long.
- Clarisse McClellan is a teenage girl one month short of her 17th birthday (Note: Clarisse tells Montag she is "seventeen and crazy", later admitting that she will actually be seventeen "next month".) who is Montag's neighbor. She walks with Montag on his trips home from work. A modern critic has described her as an example of the Manic Pixie Dream Girl, as Clarisse is an unusual sort of person compared to the others inhabiting the bookless, hedonistic society: outgoing, naturally cheerful, unorthodox, and intuitive. She is unpopular among peers and disliked by teachers for asking "why" instead of "how" and focusing on nature rather than on technology. A few days after her first meeting with Montag, she disappears without any explanation; Mildred tells Montag (and Captain Beatty confirms) that Clarisse was hit by a speeding car and that her family moved away following her death. It is implied that Beatty may have assassinated Clarisse. In the afterword of a later edition, Bradbury notes that the 1966 film adaptation changed the ending so that Clarisse (who, in the film, is now a 20-year-old schoolteacher who was fired for being unorthodox) was living with the exiles. Bradbury, far from being displeased by this, was so happy with the new ending that he wrote it into his later stage edition.
- Mildred "Millie" Montag is Guy Montag's wife. She is addicted to sleeping pills, absorbed in the shallow dramas played on her "parlor walls" (large, flat-panel televisions), and indifferent to the oppressive society around her. She is described in the book as "thin as a praying mantis from dieting, her hair burnt by chemicals to a brittle straw, and her flesh like white bacon." Despite her husband's attempts to break her from the spell society has on her, Mildred continues to be shallow and indifferent. After Montag scares her friends away by reading Dover Beach, and finding herself unable to live with someone who has been hoarding books, Mildred betrays Montag by reporting him to the firemen and abandoning him, and presumably dies when the city is bombed.
- Captain Beatty is Montag's boss and the book's main antagonist. Once an avid reader, he has come to hate books due to their unpleasant content and contradicting facts and opinions. After he forces Montag to burn his own house, Montag kills him with a flamethrower. In a scene written years later by Bradbury for the Fahrenheit 451 play, Beatty invites Montag to his house where he shows him walls of books left to molder on their shelves.
- Stoneman and Black are Montag's coworkers at the firehouse. They do not have a large impact on the story and function only to show the reader the contrast between the firemen who obediently do as they are told and someone like Montag, who formerly took pride in his job but subsequently realizes how damaging it is to society. Black is later framed by Montag for possessing books.
- Faber is a former English professor. He has spent years regretting that he did not defend books when he saw the moves to ban them. Montag turns to him for guidance, remembering him from a chance meeting in a park sometime earlier. Faber at first refuses to help Montag and later realizes Montag is only trying to learn about books, not destroy them. He secretly communicates with Montag through an electronic earpiece and helps Montag escape the city, then gets on a bus to St. Louis and escapes the city himself before it is bombed. Bradbury notes in his afterword that Faber is part of the name of a German manufacturer of pencils, Faber-Castell; it is also the name of a publishing company, Faber and Faber.
- Mrs. Ann Bowles and Mrs. Clara Phelps are Mildred's friends and representative of the anti-intellectual, hedonistic mainstream society presented in the novel. During a social visit to Montag's house, they brag about ignoring the bad things in their lives and have a cavalier attitude towards the upcoming war, their husbands, their children, and politics. Mrs. Phelps' husband Pete was called in to fight in the upcoming war (and believes that he will be back in a week because of how quick the war will be) and thinks having children serves no purpose other than to ruin lives. Mrs. Bowles is a three-times-married single mother. Her first husband divorced her, her second died in a jet accident, and her third committed suicide by shooting himself in the head. She has two children who do not like or respect her due to her permissive, often negligent and abusive parenting; Mrs. Bowles brags that her kids beat her up, and she's glad she can hit back. When Montag reads Dover Beach to them, he strikes a chord in Mrs. Phelps, who starts crying over how hollow her life is. Mrs. Bowles chastises Montag for reading "silly awful hurting words".
- Granger is the leader of a group of wandering intellectual exiles who memorize books in order to preserve their contents.

== Title ==
The title page of the book explains the title as follows: Fahrenheit 451—The temperature at which book paper catches fire and burns.... On inquiring about the temperature at which paper would catch fire, Bradbury had been told that 451 °F (233 °C) was the autoignition temperature of paper. In various studies, scientists have placed the autoignition temperature at a range of temperatures between 424 and 475 °F (218 and 246 °C), depending on the type of paper.

== Writing and development ==
Fahrenheit 451 developed out of a series of ideas Bradbury had visited in previously written stories. For many years, he tended to single out "The Pedestrian" in interviews and lectures as sort of a proto-Fahrenheit 451. In the preface of his 2006 anthology Match to Flame: The Fictional Paths to Fahrenheit 451 he states that this is an oversimplification. The full genealogy of Fahrenheit 451 given in Match to Flame is involved. The following covers the most salient aspects.

Between 1947 and 1948, Bradbury wrote the short story "Bright Phoenix" (not published until the May 1963 issue of The Magazine of Fantasy & Science Fiction) about a librarian who confronts a book-burning "Chief Censor" named Jonathan Barnes.

In late 1949, Bradbury was stopped and questioned by a police officer while walking late one night. When asked "What are you doing?", Bradbury wisecracked, "Putting one foot in front of another". This incident inspired Bradbury to write the 1951 short story "The Pedestrian". (Note: "The Pedestrian" would go on to be published in The Reporter magazine on August 7, 1951, that is, after the publication in February 1951 of its inspired work "The Fireman".)

In "The Pedestrian", Leonard Mead is harassed and detained by the city's only remotely operated police cruiser for taking nighttime walks, something that has become extremely rare in this future-based setting, as everybody else stays inside and watches television ("viewing screens"). Alone and without an alibi, Mead is taken to the "Psychiatric Center for Research on Regressive Tendencies" for his peculiar habit. Fahrenheit 451 echoed this theme of an authoritarian society distracted by broadcast media.

Bradbury expanded the book-burning premise of "Bright Phoenix" and the totalitarian future of "The Pedestrian" into "The Fireman", a novella published in the February 1951 issue of Galaxy Science Fiction. "The Fireman" was written in the basement of UCLA's Powell Library on a typewriter that he rented for a fee of ten cents per half hour. The first draft was 25,000 words long and was completed in nine days.

Urged by a publisher at Ballantine Books to double the length of his story to make a novel, Bradbury returned to the same typing room and made the story 25,000 words longer, again taking nine days. The title "Fahrenheit 451" came to him on January 22. The final manuscript was ready in mid-August, 1953. The resulting novel, which some considered as a fix-up (despite being an expanded rewrite of one single novella), was published by Ballantine in 1953.

=== Supplementary material ===
Bradbury has supplemented the novel with various front and back matter, including a 1979 coda, a 1982 afterword, a 1993 foreword, and several introductions.

== Publication history ==
The first U.S. printing was a paperback version from October 1953 by The Ballantine Publishing Group. Shortly after the paperback, a hardback version was released that included a special edition of 200 signed and numbered copies bound in asbestos. These were technically collections because the novel was published with two short stories, "The Playground" and "And the Rock Cried Out", which have been omitted from later printings. A few months later, the novel was serialized in the March, April, and May 1954 issues of nascent Playboy magazine.

=== Expurgation ===
Starting in January 1967, Fahrenheit 451 was subject to expurgation by its publisher, Ballantine Books, with the release of the "Bal-Hi Edition" aimed at high school students. Among the changes made by the publisher were the censorship of the words "hell", "damn", and "abortion"; the modification of seventy-five passages; and the changing of two incidents.

In the first incident, a drunk man is changed to a "sick man", while the second involves cleaning fluff out of a human navel, which instead becomes "cleaning ears" in the other. For a while, both the censored and uncensored versions were available concurrently, but by 1973, Ballantine was publishing only the censored version. That continued until 1979, when it came to Bradbury's attention:

In 1979, one of Bradbury's friends showed him an expurgated copy of the book. Bradbury demanded that Ballantine Books withdraw that version and replace it with the original, and in 1980 the original version once again became available. In this reinstated work, in the Author's Afterword, Bradbury relates to the reader that it is not uncommon for a publisher to expurgate an author's work, but he asserts that he himself will not tolerate the practice of manuscript "mutilation".

The "Bal-Hi" editions are now referred to by the publisher as the "Revised Bal-Hi" editions.

=== Non-print publications ===
An audiobook version read by Bradbury himself was released in 1976 and received a Spoken Word Grammy nomination. Another audiobook was released in 2005 narrated by Christopher Hurt. The e-book version was released in December 2011.

== Reception ==
In 1954, Galaxy Science Fiction reviewer Groff Conklin placed the novel "among the great works of the imagination written in English in the last decade or more." The Chicago Sunday Tribune's August Derleth described the book as "a savage and shockingly prophetic view of one possible future way of life", calling it "compelling" and praising Bradbury for his "brilliant imagination". Over half a century later, Sam Weller wrote, "upon its publication, Fahrenheit 451 was hailed as a visionary work of social commentary." Today, Fahrenheit 451 is still viewed as an important cautionary tale about conformity and the evils of government censorship.

When the novel was first published, there were those who did not find merit in the tale. Anthony Boucher and J. Francis McComas were less enthusiastic, faulting the book for being "simply padded, occasionally with startlingly ingenious gimmickry, ... often with coruscating cascades of verbal brilliance [but] too often merely with words." Reviewing the book for Astounding Science Fiction, P. Schuyler Miller characterized the title piece as "one of Bradbury's bitter, almost hysterical diatribes," while praising its "emotional drive and compelling, nagging detail." Similarly, The New York Times was unimpressed with the novel and further accused Bradbury of developing a "virulent hatred for many aspects of present-day culture, namely, such monstrosities as radio, TV, most movies, amateur and professional sports, automobiles, and other similar aberrations which he feels debase the bright simplicity of the thinking man's existence."

Fahrenheit 451 was number seven on the list of "Top Check Outs OF ALL TIME" by the New York Public Library.

=== Censorship/banning incidents ===
In the years since its publication, Fahrenheit 451 has occasionally been banned, censored, or redacted in some schools at the behest of parents or teaching staff either unaware of or indifferent to the inherent irony in such censorship. Notable incidents include:

- In Apartheid South Africa, the book was burned along with thousands of banned publications between the 1950s and 1970s.
- In 1987, Fahrenheit 451 was given "third tier" status by the Bay County School Board in Panama City, Florida, under superintendent Leonard Hall's new three-tier classification system. Third tier was meant for books to be removed from the classroom for "a lot of vulgarity". After a resident class-action lawsuit, a media stir, and student protests, the school board abandoned their tier-based censorship system and approved all the currently used books.
- In 1992, Venado Middle School in Irvine, California, gave copies of Fahrenheit 451 to students with all "obscene" words blacked out. Parents contacted the local media and succeeded in reinstalling the uncensored copies.
- In 2006, parents of a 10th-grade high school student in Montgomery County, Texas, demanded the book be banned from their daughter's English class reading list. Their daughter was assigned the book during Banned Books Week, but stopped reading several pages in due to what she considered the offensive language and description of the burning of the Bible. In addition, the parents protested the violence, portrayal of Christians, and depictions of firemen in the novel.

== Themes ==
Discussions about Fahrenheit 451 often center on its story foremost as a warning against state-based censorship. Indeed, when Bradbury wrote the novel during the McCarthy era, he was concerned about censorship in the United States. During a radio interview in 1956, Bradbury said

I wrote this book at a time when I was worried about the way things were going in this country four years ago. Too many people were afraid of their shadows; there was a threat of book burning. Many of the books were being taken off the shelves at that time. And of course, things have changed a lot in four years. Things are going back in a very healthy direction. But at the time I wanted to do some sort of story where I could comment on what would happen to a country if we let ourselves go too far in this direction, where then all thinking stops, and the dragon swallows his tail, and we sort of vanish into a limbo and we destroy ourselves by this sort of action.

As time went by, Bradbury tended to dismiss censorship as a chief motivating factor for writing the story. Instead he usually claimed that the real messages of Fahrenheit 451 were about the dangers of an illiterate society infatuated with mass media and the threat of minority and special interest groups to books. In the late 1950s, Bradbury recounted

In writing the short novel Fahrenheit 451, I thought I was describing a world that might evolve in four or five decades. But only a few weeks ago, in Beverly Hills one night, a husband and wife passed me, walking their dog. I stood staring after them, absolutely stunned. The woman held in one hand a small cigarette-package-sized radio, its antenna quivering. From this sprang tiny copper wires which ended in a dainty cone plugged into her right ear. There she was, oblivious to man and dog, listening to far winds and whispers and soap-opera cries, sleep-walking, helped up and down curbs by a husband who might just as well not have been there. This was not fiction.

This story echoes Mildred's "Seashell ear-thimbles" (i.e., a brand of in-ear headphones) that act as an emotional barrier between her and Montag. In a 2007 interview, Bradbury maintained that people misinterpret his book and that Fahrenheit 451 is really a statement on how mass media like television marginalizes the reading of literature. Regarding minorities, he wrote in his 1979 Coda

'There is more than one way to burn a book. And the world is full of people running about with lit matches. Every minority, be it Baptist/Unitarian, Irish/Italian/Octogenarian/Zen Buddhist, Zionist/Seventh-day Adventist, Women's Lib/Republican, Mattachine/Four Square Gospel feels it has the will, the right, the duty to douse the kerosene, light the fuse. [...] Fire-Captain Beatty, in my novel Fahrenheit 451, described how the books were burned first by minorities, each ripping a page or a paragraph from this book, then that, until the day came when the books were empty and the minds shut and the libraries closed forever. [...] Only six weeks ago, I discovered that, over the years, some cubby-hole editors at Ballantine Books, fearful of contaminating the young, had, bit by bit, censored some seventy-five separate sections from the novel. Students, reading the novel, which, after all, deals with censorship and book-burning in the future, wrote to tell me of this exquisite irony. Judy-Lynn del Rey, one of the new Ballantine editors, is having the entire book reset and republished this summer with all the damns and hells back in place.

Book-burning censorship, Bradbury would argue, was a side-effect of these two primary factors; this is consistent with Captain Beatty's speech to Montag about the history of the firemen. According to Bradbury, it is the people, not the state, who are the culprit in Fahrenheit 451. Fahrenheit's censorship is not the result of an authoritarian program to retain power, but the result of a fragmented society seeking to accommodate its challenges by deploying the power of entertainment and technology. As Captain Beatty explains (p. 55)

...The bigger your market, Montag, the less you handle controversy, remember that! All the minor minorities with their navels to be kept clean."[...] "It didn't come from the Government down. There was no dictum, no declaration, no censorship, to start with, no! Technology, mass exploitation, and minority pressure carried the trick, thank God.

A variety of other themes in the novel besides censorship have been suggested. Two major themes are resistance to conformity and control of individuals via technology and mass media. Bradbury explores how the government is able to use mass media to influence society and suppress individualism through book burning. The characters Beatty and Faber point out that the American population is to blame. Due to their constant desire for a simplistic, positive image, books must be suppressed. Beatty blames the minority groups, who would take offense to published works that displayed them in an unfavorable light. Faber went further to state that, rather than the government banning books, the American population simply stopped reading on their own. He notes that the book burnings themselves became a form of entertainment for the general public.

In a 1994 interview, Bradbury stated that Fahrenheit 451 was more relevant during this time than in any other, stating that, "it works even better because we have political correctness now. Political correctness is the real enemy these days. The black groups want to control our thinking and you can't say certain things. The homosexual groups don't want you to criticize them. It's thought control and freedom of speech control."

== Predictions for the future ==
Fahrenheit 451 is set in an unspecified city and time, though it is written as if set in a distant future. The earliest editions make clear that it takes place no earlier than the year 2022 due to a reference to an atomic war taking place during that year. (Note: In early editions of the book, Montag says, "We've started and won two atomic wars since 1960", in the first pages of The Sieve and the Sand. This sets a lower bound on the time setting. In later decades, some editions have changed this year to 1990 or 2022.)

Bradbury described himself as "a preventer of futures, not a predictor of them." He did not believe that book burning was an inevitable part of the future; he wanted to warn against its development. In a later interview, when asked if he believes that teaching Fahrenheit 451 in schools will prevent his totalitarian vision of the future, Bradbury replied in the negative. Rather, he states that education must be at the kindergarten and first-grade level. If students are unable to read then, they will be unable to read Fahrenheit 451.

As to technology, Sam Weller notes that Bradbury "predicted everything from flat-panel televisions to earbud headphones and twenty-four-hour banking machines."

== Adaptations ==
=== Television ===
Playhouse 90 broadcast "A Sound of Different Drummers" on CBS in 1957, written by Robert Alan Aurthur. The play combined plot ideas from Fahrenheit 451 and Nineteen Eighty-Four. Bradbury sued and eventually won on appeal.

=== Film ===
A film adaptation written and directed by François Truffaut and starring Oskar Werner and Julie Christie was released in 1966.

A film adaptation directed by Ramin Bahrani and starring Michael B. Jordan, Michael Shannon, Sofia Boutella, and Lilly Singh was released in 2018 for HBO.

=== Theater ===
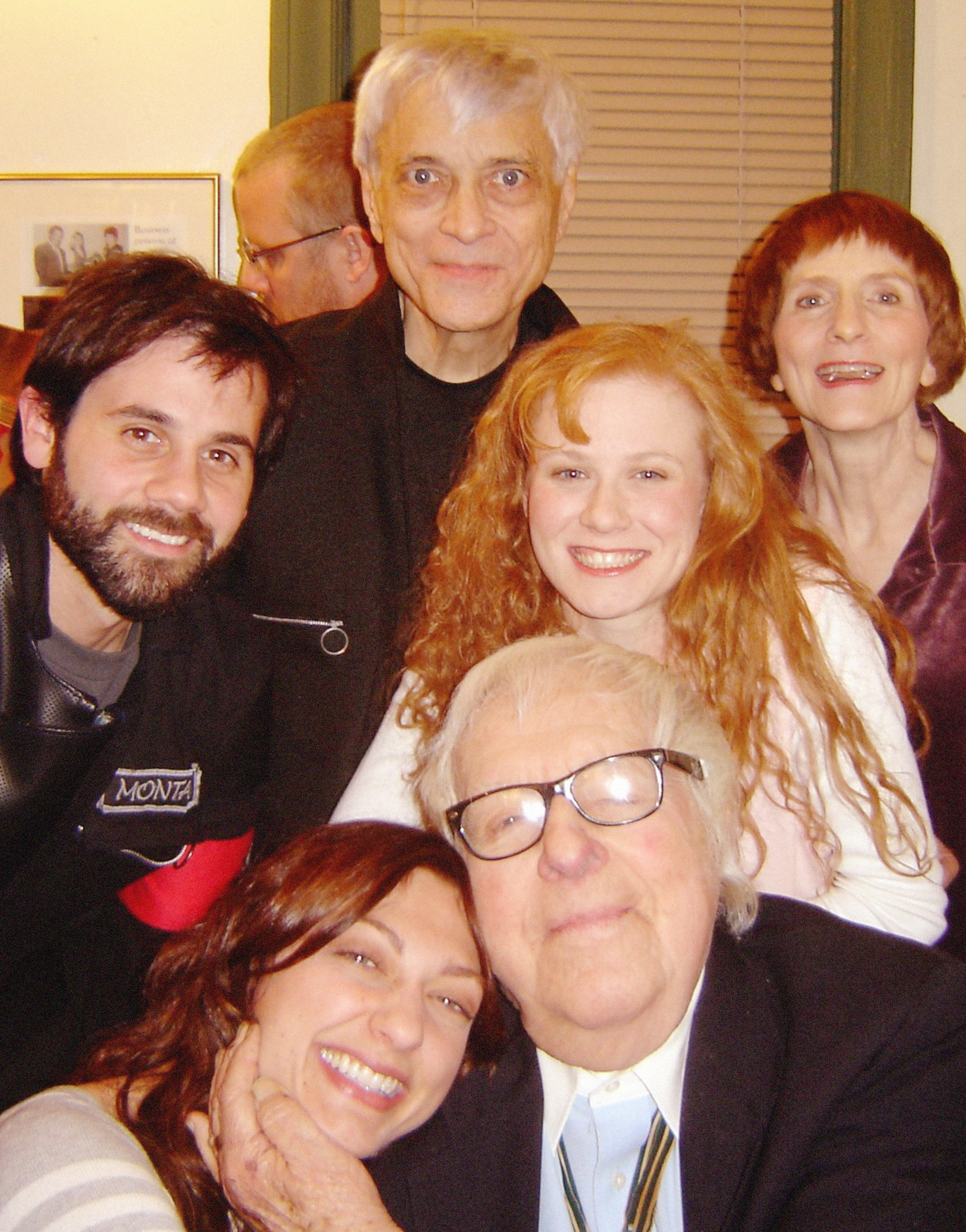
Mageina Tovah, Ray Bradbury, David Mauer (Montag), Jessica D. Stone (Clarisse), Michael Prichard (Captain Beatty) and Roses Prichard backstage of Fahrenheit 451 by the Pandemonium Theatre Company at the Fremont Centre Theatre, Pasadena, California in August 2008

In the late 1970s Bradbury adapted his book into a play. At least part of it was performed at the Colony Theatre in Los Angeles in 1979, but it was not in print until 1986 and the official world premiere was only in November 1988 by the Fort Wayne, Indiana Civic Theatre. The stage adaptation diverges considerably from the book and seems influenced by Truffaut's movie. For example, fire chief Beatty's character is fleshed out and is the wordiest role in the play. As in the movie, Clarisse does not simply disappear but in the finale meets up with Montag as a book character (she as Robert Louis Stevenson, he as Edgar Allan Poe).

The UK premiere of Bradbury's stage adaptation was not until 2003 in Nottingham, while it took until 2006 before the Godlight Theatre Company produced and performed its New York City premiere at 59E59 Theaters. After the completion of the New York run, the production then transferred to the Edinburgh Festival where it was a 2006 Edinburgh Festival Pick of the Fringe.

The Off-Broadway theatre The American Place Theatre presented a one man show adaptation of Fahrenheit 451 as a part of their 2008–2009 Literature to Life season.

Bradbury's Pandemonium Theatre Company staged a production at the Fremont Centre Theatre in South Pasadena from April through December 2008, which was led by resident director Alan Neal Hubbs, produced by Bradbury and Racquel Lehrman, and starred David Polcyn (alternated with David Mauer and Lee Holmes) as Montag, Mageina Tovah alternating with Tanya Mounsey as Montag's wife, Jessica D. Stone as Clarisse, and Michael Prichard as Captain Beatty. The play was extended multiple times during its run for its reported popularity with audiences.

Fahrenheit 451 inspired the Birmingham Repertory Theatre production Time Has Fallen Asleep in the Afternoon Sunshine, which was performed at the Birmingham Central Library in April 2012.

=== Radio ===
In 1982, Gregory Evans' radio dramatization of the novel was broadcast on BBC Radio 4 starring Michael Pennington as Montag. It was broadcast eight more times on BBC Radio 4 Extra, twice each in 2010, 2012, 2013, and 2015.

BBC Radio's second dramatization, by David Calcutt, was broadcast on BBC Radio 4 in 2003, starring Stephen Tomlin in the same role.

=== Music ===
In 1984 the new wave band Scortilla released the song Fahrenheit 451 inspired by the book by R. Bradbury and the film by F. Truffaut.

In 2025, one composition on the instrumental concept album The Ray Bradbury Chronicles was based on the book, with three sections (City, Escape, Exile) inspired by the key stages of the novel's plotline.

=== Computer games ===
In 1984, the novel was adapted into a computer text adventure game of the same name by the software company Trillium, serving as a sequel to the events of the novel, and co-written by Len Neufeld and Bradbury himself.

=== Comics ===
In June 2009, a graphic novel edition of the book was published. Entitled Ray Bradbury's Fahrenheit 451: The Authorized Adaptation, the paperback graphic adaptation was illustrated by Tim Hamilton. The introduction in the novel is written by Bradbury himself.

== Cultural references ==
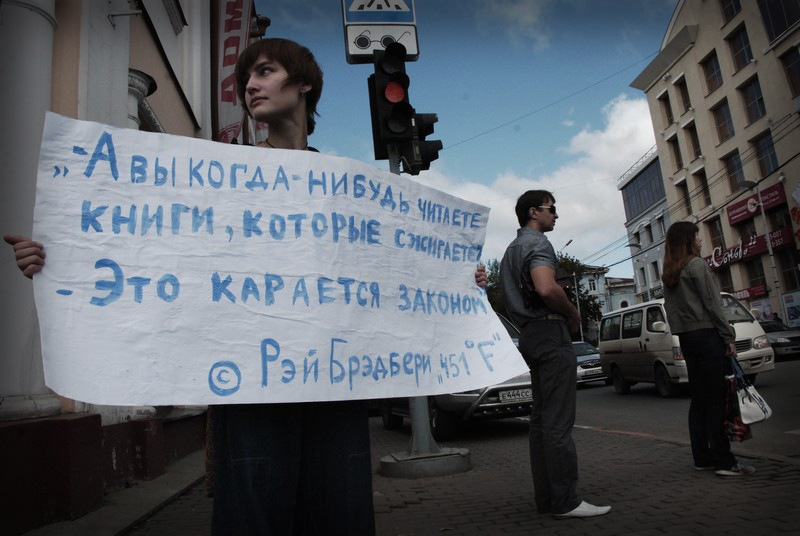
A protester against the Bhagavad Gita trial in Russia showing a quote from the novel: "– Do you ever read any of the books you burn? – That's against the law".

Michael Moore's 2004 documentary Fahrenheit 9/11 refers to Bradbury's novel and the September 11 attacks, emphasized by the film's tagline "The temperature where freedom burns". The film takes a critical look at the presidency of George W. Bush, the war on terror, and its coverage in the news media, and became the highest grossing documentary of all time. Bradbury was upset by what he considered the appropriation of his title, and wanted the film renamed. He really didn't want to be associated in any way. Moore filmed a subsequent documentary about the 2016 election of Donald Trump called Fahrenheit 11/9 in 2018, but compared to the earlier documentary, there was a complete shift in interest by the general audience.

In 2015, the Internet Engineering Steering Group approved the publication of An HTTP Status Code to Report Legal Obstacles, now RFC 7725, which specifies that websites forced to block resources for legal reasons should return a status code of 451 when users request those resources.

Guy Montag (as Gui Montag) is used in the 1998 real-time strategy game StarCraft as a terran firebat hero.

The number "451", and sometimes "0451", are often included as the first security code a player encounters in immersive sim video games as a reference to the System Shock series of games which first included the code as their own reference to Bradbury's novel.

Anthropic's Project Panama has drawn comparison to the events of Fahrenheit 451.

== See also ==
- Brave New World
- Burning of books and burying of scholars
- HTTP 451
