= Fahrenheit (Chilean band) =

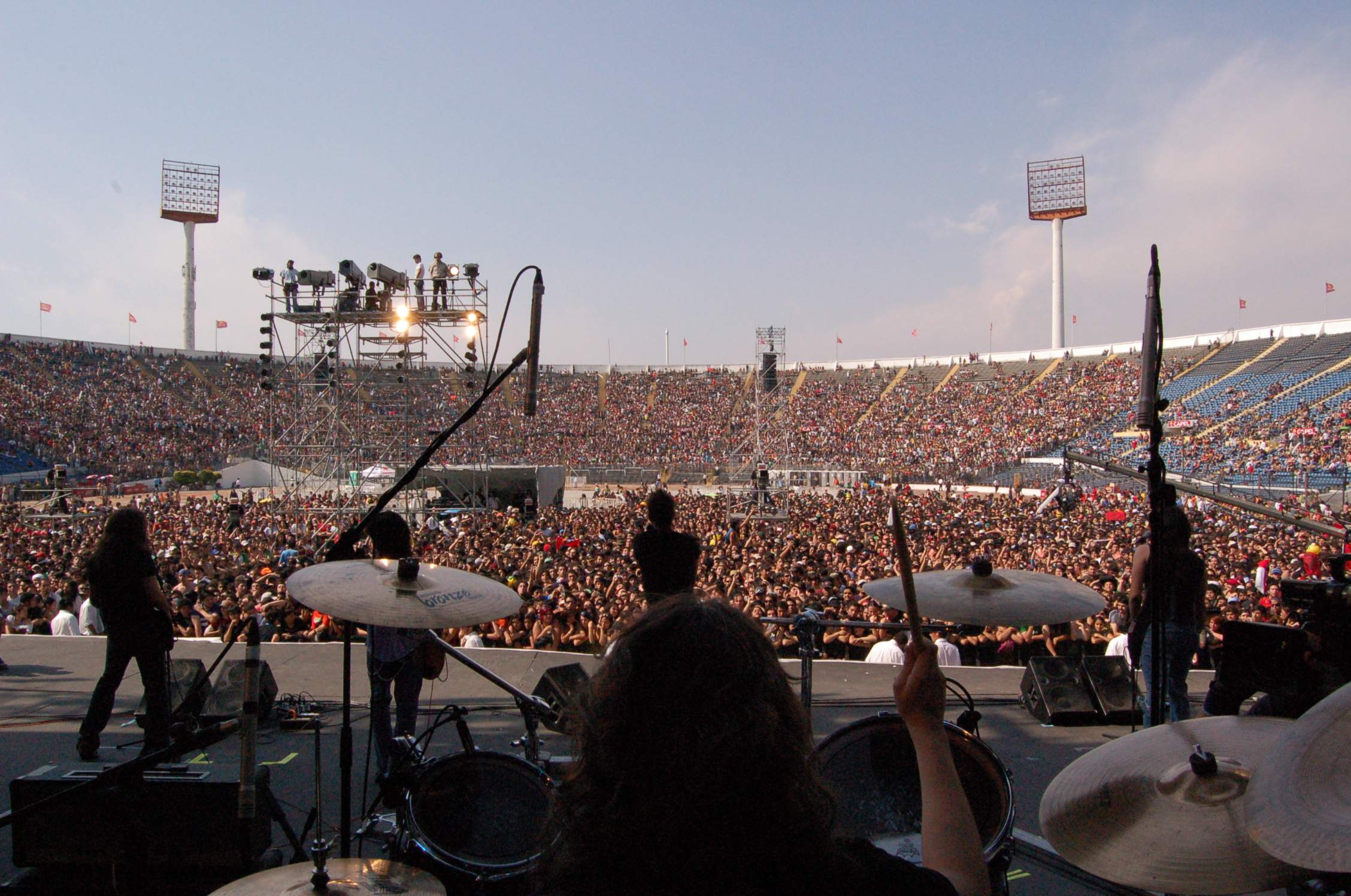
- Cumbre del Rock 2007.

Background information
- Origin: Santiago, Chile
- Genres: Hard rock, heavy metal, rock music
- Years active: since 2001
- Labels: Perris Records, Sello Oveja Negra
- Members: Chaz Thomson; Carlos Otto; Carlos Cid; Ignacio Torres; Juan Ignacio Almarza
- Past members: Diego Bombardiere; Javier Bassino; Felipe Mira; Juan Pablo Lewin
- Website: fahrenheitmusic.com

Fahrenheit (stylized °Fahrenheit) is a hard rock band from Santiago, Chile, deeply influenced by 1980s and '70s rock artists such as Aerosmith, Mötley Crüe and Skid Row. °Fahrenheit were well known in the Latin-American rock scene for their intense on-stage performance, energetic sound and guitar solos.

Throughout twelve years of career, °Fahrenheit received positive reviews from the media, along with worldwide exposure through MTV and Much Music, breaking new ground in the yet unexplored Spanish rock market.

The band played massive shows in Chile and Mexico, including opening for Evanescence, Mötley Crüe and the "Vive Latino" festival.

After releasing their debut album "Chain Reaction" through Perris Records, the band decided to develop their music in its native language and started working in their first Spanish album, "Nuevos Tiempos", with multi-platinum producer David Prater, known for his work with Dream Theater, Firehouse and the Dirty Dancing movie OST.

== History ==
The band was formed in 2001, when guitarist Carlos Otto and bassist Juan Pablo Lewin started composing tunes deeply influenced in 80's glam rock legends such as Guns N' Roses, Mötley Crüe and Journey. Slowly the band began to make its way in a difficult underground scene in Santiago, ruled at the time by a strong "aggro metal" trend. In 2004 they record their first LP album, "Chain Reaction", which got the attention of independent US label Perris Records, distributing the album in the US, Japan and Europe.

Even though their debut album received positive reviews from the specialized media and fans of the genre, the band felt the need to evolve in their sound and concept, which at the time was being tagged as a "glam-rock revival". For the recording of their second album they managed to get in touch with producer David Prater, best known for his multi-platinum work with Dream Theater ("Images & Words" and "A change of seasons"), Firehouse ("Firehouse" and "Hold your fire") and 2 hit singles from the "Dirty Dancing" movie original soundtrack, "Hungry eyes" and "Time of my life".

Against all odds, based on the precariousness of the Chilean musical rock scene, the band pulled their efforts together and found the way to hire Prater to produce their second album. Because there were no precedents of this kind of music in the Latin scene, the band decided to record in their native language, Spanish, and developed a power and modern sound, creating "Nuevos Tiempos".

By the end of 2006, Chilean label "Oveja Negra" signed the band and the name °Fahrenheit began to appear in massive media with their first single "Vuelvo a vivir" being aired on the most popular radio stations in Chile and MTV.

In January 2007 the band was invited to the biggest Chilean rock festival ever made, "La Cumbre del Rock", playing in front of more than 45,000 people in "Estadio Nacional" of Santiago. Soon after, they release "Inimaginable" which again was airplayed on MTV and played part in the soundtrack of a very popular soap opera at the time, "Vivir con 10".

The same year the band was invited by Amy Lee's manager, Andrew Lurie, to open for Evanescence at their show in Santiago, after listening to the band's songs in their Myspace. This generated interest in the media, which grew bigger because two days later they were playing another historic festival, "Vive Latino" in Chile, with bands such as Los tres, Keane, Catupecu Machu and others.

By the end of the year, they released third single "Nuevos Tiempos", whose videoclip reached the "10+ Pedidos" ranking of MTV and showed a very different concept for Latin rock. From that point on, the band got a media attention not usual for their musical genre: interviews and reviews in the main radios and TV stations, magazines, webzines, etc. By touring and playing everywhere they could, the band kept on recruiting fans throughout the country.

In 2008 and after a few changes in their line-up, the band releases their fourth and last single, "Euforia", closing the "Nuevos Tiempos" chapter and beginning the creation of their third album, soon to be released during late 2009.

In 2008 the band resided in Mexico, country were fellow Chilean bands like "La Ley" and "Los Bunkers" have been very successful, hoping to broaden horizons for their music and career.

Artwork for the band's album covers has been created by artist Claudio Bergamin

By the end of 2009 the band finishes the recording of its third album, "Caída Libre" (Free fall), released in three separated EP's for free download on the band's official site. Each section or EP (Extended play) had the name of the three Newton's laws of motion.

== Present ==
After nearly fifteen years devoted to side projects, including FHT and other spin-off ventures created by members of Fahrenheit, the band officially returned in 2025 with The Love EP, released as a preview of their upcoming work. The current lineup consists of Chaz Thomson, Nacho “Dedos Largos,” Carlos Otto, Professor Cid, and Juan Ignacio Almarza.

== Influences ==
The band had strong influences from other bands like AC/DC, Mötley Crüe, Skid Row, Guns N' Roses, Van Halen, Dream Theater, Iron Maiden, Metallica, Aerosmith, Europe, Journey, Queen, Def Leppard or Bon Jovi.

== Band members ==
(2001–2004)	Chaz Thomson - vocals; Javier Bassino - guitar; Carlos Otto - guitar; Juan Pablo Lewin - bass guitar; Diego Bombardiere - drums
(2004–2007)	Chaz Thomson - vocals; Javier Bassino - guitar; Carlos Otto - guitar; Carlos Cid - bass guitar; Diego Bombardiere - drums
(2007–2008)	Felipe Mira - vocals; Javier Bassino - guitar; Carlos Otto - guitar; Carlos Cid - bass guitar; Diego Bombardiere - drums
(2008–2012)	Felipe Mira - vocals; Ignacio Torres - guitar; Carlos Otto - guitar; Carlos Cid - bass guitar; Andrés Torres - drums
(2025-now)	Chaz Thomson - vocals; Ignacio Torres - guitar; Carlos Otto - guitar; Carlos Cid - bass guitar; Juan Ignacio Almarza - drums

== Discography ==
- Chain Reaction (2004).
- Nuevos Tiempos (2007).
- Caída Libre (2009).
- The Love EP (2025).

=== Singles ===
- King of the night (2004)
- Vuelvo a Vivir (2006)
- Inimaginable (2007)
- Nuevos Tiempos (2007)
- Euforia (2008)
- Sentir (2010)
- Tren a mil (2010)
- Voodoo Negra (2012)
- Malavita (2013)
- Love Lovin' You (2025)

== See also ==
- Official Site
