= Fahrenheit 451 (1966 film) =

Film by François Truffaut

- Theatrical release poster
- Directed by: François Truffaut
- Screenplay by: François Truffaut; Jean-Louis Richard
- Based on: Fahrenheit 451 by Ray Bradbury
- Produced by: Lewis M. Allen
- Starring: Julie Christie; Oskar Werner; Cyril Cusack; Anton Diffring; Jeremy Spenser; Alex Scott
- Cinematography: Nicolas Roeg
- Edited by: Thom Noble
- Music by: Bernard Herrmann
- Production companies: Anglo Enterprises; Vineyard Film Ltd.
- Distributed by: Rank Film Distributors
- Release dates: 15 September 1966 (France); 16 September 1966 (United Kingdom)
- Running time: 112 minutes
- Country: United Kingdom
- Language: English
- Budget: $1.5 million
- Box office: $1 million (US and Canada rentals); 779,811 admissions (France)

Fahrenheit 451 is a 1966 British dystopian drama film directed by François Truffaut and starring Julie Christie, Oskar Werner, and Cyril Cusack. Based on the 1953 novel of the same name by Ray Bradbury, the film takes place in a controlled society in an oppressive future, in which the government sends out firemen to destroy all literature to prevent revolution and thinking.

The film received mixed reviews upon its release, but has since garnered critical reevaluation over the years. This was Truffaut's first colour film and his only non French-language film. At the 27th Venice International Film Festival, Fahrenheit 451 was nominated for the Golden Lion.

== Plot ==
In the future, a totalitarian government will employ a force known as Firemen to seek out and destroy all literature. They can search anyone, anywhere, at any time, and burn any books they find. One of the firemen, Guy Montag, meets one of his neighbors, Clarisse, a young school teacher who may be on the government's radar due to her unorthodox views. The two discuss his job, and she asks whether he ever reads the books he burns. Curious, he begins to hide books in his house and read them, starting with Charles Dickens's David Copperfield. This leads to conflict with his wife, Linda, who is more concerned with being popular enough to be a member of The Family, an interactive television programme that refers to its viewers as "cousins".

At the house of an illegal book collector, the fire captain, Beatty, talks with Montag at length about how books make people unhappy and make them want to think that they are better than others, which is considered anti-social. The book collector, an old woman who was seen with Clarisse a few times during Montag's rides to and from work, refuses to leave her house, opting instead to burn herself and the house so that she can die with her books.

Returning home that day, Montag tries to tell Linda and her friends about the woman who martyred herself in the name of books and confronts them about knowing anything about what's going on in the world, calling them "zombies" and telling them that they're just "killing time" instead of living life. Disturbed over Montag's behavior, Linda's friends try to leave, but Montag stops them by forcing them to sit and listen to him read a passage from the novel David Copperfield. Montag reads a highly abridged excerpt from chapter 48, beginning with the words "There can be no disparity in marriage like unsuitability of mind and purpose" which describe Dora's death. During the reading, one of Linda's friends breaks down crying, aware of the feelings she repressed over the years, while Linda's other friends leave in disgust over Montag's alleged cruelty and the "sick" content of the novel.

That night, Montag dreams of Clarisse as the book collector who killed herself. The same night, Clarisse's house is raided, but she escapes through a trapdoor in the roof, thanks to her uncle. Montag breaks into Beatty's office, looking for information about the missing Clarisse, and is caught but not punished.

Montag meets with Clarisse and helps her break back into her house to destroy papers that would bring the Firemen to others like her. She tells him of the "book people", a hidden sect of people who flout the law, each of whom has memorised a book to keep it alive. Later, Montag tells Beatty that he is resigning but is persuaded to go on one more call, which turns out to be Montag's own house.

Linda leaves the house, telling Montag that she couldn't live with his book obsession and leaves him to be punished by the Firemen. Angrily, he destroys the bedroom and television before setting fire to the books. Beatty lectures him about the books and pulls a last book from Montag's coat, for which Montag kills him with the flamethrower. He escapes and finds the book people, including Clarisse, where he views his "capture" on television, staged to keep the masses entertained and because the government doesn't want it to be known that he is alive. Montag selects a book to memorise, Tales of Mystery and Imagination by Edgar Allan Poe, and becomes one of the book people.

== Cast ==
- Oskar Werner as Guy Montag
- Julie Christie as Linda Montag/Clarisse
- Cyril Cusack as Captain Beatty
- Anton Diffring as Fabian/Headmistress
- Jeremy Spenser as Man with the Apple
- Bee Duffell as Book woman
- Alex Scott as Book Person: The Life of Henry Brulard
- Gillian Lewis as Cousin Midge on TV

Additionally, Alan Ford played one of the firemen in an uncredited role.

== Production ==
=== Casting ===
Truffaut kept a detailed diary during the production and later published in both French and English (in Cahiers du Cinéma in English). In this diary, he called Fahrenheit 451 his "saddest and most difficult" film-making experience, mainly because of intense conflicts between Werner and himself.

The film was Universal Pictures' first European production. Julie Christie was originally cast as just Linda Montag, not both Linda and Clarisse. The part of Clarisse was offered to Jean Seberg and Jane Fonda. After much thought, Truffaut decided that the characters should not have a villain/hero relationship but rather be two sides of the same coin and cast Christie in both roles, although the idea came from the producer, Lewis M. Allen.

In an interview from 1998, Charles Aznavour said that he was Truffaut's first choice to play the role given to Werner; Aznavour said that Jean-Paul Belmondo was the director's second choice, but the producers refused on the grounds that both of them were not familiar enough for the English-speaking audience. Paul Newman, Peter O'Toole and Montgomery Clift were also considered for the role of Montag; Terence Stamp was cast but dropped out when he feared being overshadowed by Christie's dual roles in the film. Laurence Olivier, Michael Redgrave and Sterling Hayden were considered for the role of the Captain, before Cyril Cusack was cast.

=== Filming ===
The film was shot at Pinewood Studios in England, with the monorail exterior scene taken at the French SAFEGE test track in Châteauneuf-sur-Loire near Orléans, France (since dismantled). The film featured the Alton housing estate in Roehampton, south-west London, and also Edgcumbe Park in Crowthorne, Berkshire. The final scene with the "Book People" reciting their chosen books was filmed at Black Park near Pinewood, in a rare and unexpected snowstorm that occurred on Julie Christie's birthday, 14 April 1966.

=== Production notes ===
- The production work was done in French, as Truffaut spoke virtually no English but co-wrote the screenplay with Jean-Louis Richard. Truffaut expressed disappointment with the often stilted and unnatural English-language dialogue. He was much happier with the version that was dubbed into French.
- The film's opening credits are spoken rather than displayed in type, which might be the director's hint of what life would be like in an illiterate culture. Tony Walton did costumes and production design, while Syd Cain did art direction.
- In 1971, some scenes from Fahrenheit 451 were used in The Different Ones, an episode of Rod Serling's Night Gallery television show, including the monorail and the flying policeman.
- Fahrenheit 451 came out in 1966, one year after a dystopian film named Alphaville was released, directed by Truffaut's friend and fellow filmmaker Jean Luc Godard. Truffaut wrote in a letter, "You mustn't think that 'Alphaville' will do any harm whatsoever to 'Fahrenheit'", but he was mistaken.
- Truffaut's adaptation differed from the novel by portraying Montag and Clarisse falling in love. Another notable aspect of the film is that Julie Christie plays two characters, Clarisse and Montag's wife Mildred, whose name was changed to Linda in the adaptation.

== Soundtrack ==
According to an introduction by Ray Bradbury to a CD of a rerecording of the film score by William Stromberg conducting the Moscow Symphony Orchestra, Bradbury had suggested Bernard Herrmann to Truffaut. Bradbury had visited the set of Torn Curtain, meeting Alfred Hitchcock and Herrmann. When Truffaut contacted Bradbury for a conference about his book, Bradbury recommended Herrmann, as Bradbury knew that Truffaut had written a detailed book about Hitchcock. When Herrmann asked Truffaut why he was chosen over modern composers, such as the director's friends Pierre Boulez or Karlheinz Stockhausen, the director replied that "They'll give me music of the twentieth century but you'll give me music of the twenty first!" Herrmann used a score of only string instruments, harp, xylophone, vibraphone, marimba and glockenspiel. As with Torn Curtain, Herrmann refused the studio's request to do a title song.

== Reception ==
=== Critical reception ===
The film had a mixed critical reception upon release. Time magazine called the film a "weirdly gay little picture that assails with both horror and humor all forms of tyranny over the mind of man"; it "strongly supports the widely held suspicion that Julie Christie cannot actually act. Though she plays two women of diametrically divergent dispositions, they seem in her portrayal to differ only in their hairdos." They also noted that the film's "somewhat remote theme challenged [Truffaut's] technical competence more than his heart; the finished film displays the artisan more than the artist".

Bosley Crowther called the film a "pretentious and pedantic production" based on "an idea that called for slashing satire of a sort beyond [Truffaut's] grasp, and with language he couldn't fashion into lively and witty dialogue. The consequence is a dull picture—dully fashioned and dully played—which is rendered all the more sullen by the dazzling color in which it is photographed." Leslie Halliwell described it as "1984 stuff, a little lacking on plot and rather tentatively directed, but with charming moments".

It has gained significant critical acclaim over the years. On the review aggregator web site Rotten Tomatoes, the film holds an 82% positive rating among top film critics based on 38 reviews. The critical consensus reads: "Fahrenheit 451 is an intriguing film that suffuses Truffaut's trademark wit and black humor with the intelligence and morality of Ray Bradbury's novel." Martin Scorsese has called the film an "underrated picture", which had influenced his own films.

=== Response by Ray Bradbury ===
Author Ray Bradbury said in later interviews that, despite its flaws, he was pleased with the film. He was particularly fond of the film's climax, where the Book People walk through a snowy countryside, reciting the poetry and prose they've memorised, set to Bernard Herrmann's melodious score. He found it especially poignant and moving. However, alluding to a possible remake, Bradbury said in a 2009 interview, "The mistake they made with the first one was to cast Julie Christie as both the revolutionary and the bored wife."

=== Awards and nominations ===
Year	Award ceremony	Category	Nominee	Result
1967	British Academy Film Awards	Best British Actress	Julie Christie (also for Doctor Zhivago)	Nominated
1967	Hugo Awards	Best Dramatic Presentation	François Truffaut, Jean-Louis Richard, Helen Scott, Ray Bradbury	Nominated
1966	Venice Film Festival	Golden Lion	François Truffaut	Nominated

== Spanish broadcast ==
Despite the totalitarian overtones in the plot, the film was broadcast uncensored on Televisión Española in the early 1970s at a time when Spanish dictator Francisco Franco was still in power.
