= Pleasure P discography =

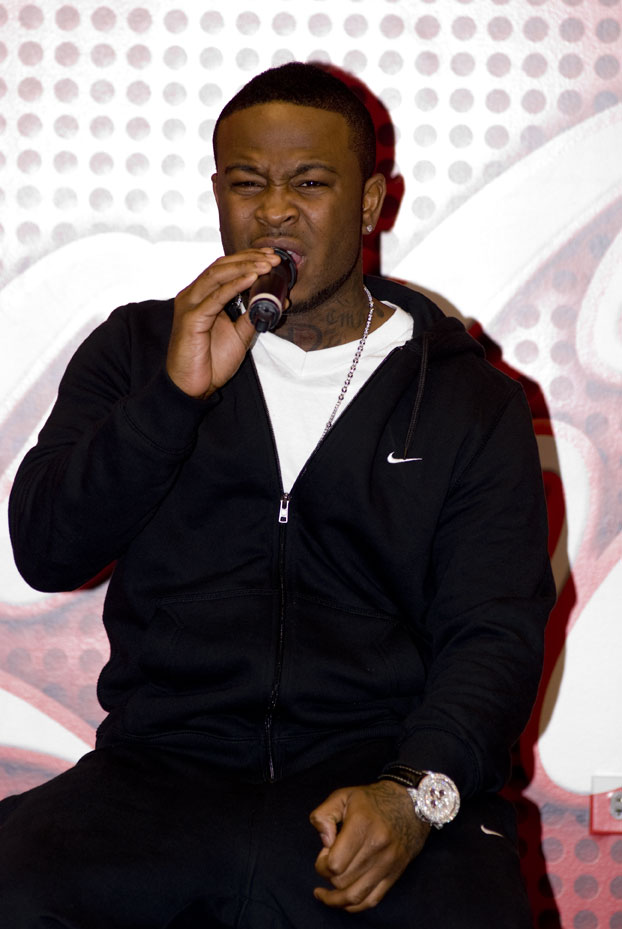
- Pleasure P performing in 2009
- Studio albums: 1
- Compilation albums: 1
- Singles: 7

This is the discography of Pleasure P.

== Studio albums ==
List of albums, with selected chart positions
Title	Album details	Peak chart positions	
Title	Album details	US	US R&B
The Introduction of Marcus Cooper	Released: June 9, 2009; Label: Swagga, Bluestar, Atlantic; Format: CD, digital download	10	2
Pleasure & Pain	Released: March 26, 2021; Label: Fast Line Entertainment; Format: Digital download, streaming	—	—
Pain & Pleasure	Released: April 2, 2021; Label: Fast Line Entertainment; Format: Digital download, streaming	—	—

== Extended plays ==
- Pleasure P Presents

== Mixtapes ==
List of mixtapes
Title	Mixtape details
4 Ur Pleasure Vol. 1	Released: September 30, 2010; Label: Self-released; Format: Digital download
Break Up to Make Up	Released: February 14, 2014; Label: Self-released; Format: Digital download
She Likes	Released: October 12, 2018; Label: X-Ray, Cleopatra; Format: CD, digital download, streaming

== Singles ==
=== As lead artist ===
List of singles, with selected chart positions, showing year released and album name
Title	Year	Peak chart positions		Album
Title	Year	US	US R&B	Album
"Did You Wrong"	2008	90	20	The Introduction of Marcus Cooper
"Boyfriend #2"	2009	42	2	The Introduction of Marcus Cooper
"Under"	2009	78	5	The Introduction of Marcus Cooper
"Change Positions"	2010	—	—	—
"I Love Girls" (featuring Tyga)	2012	—	65	—
"Do You"	2014	—	—	—
"Paralyzed"	2015	—	—	—
"Rock with You" (featuring Plies)	2015	—	—	—
"Insecure" (featuring Maor Mo)	2016	—	—	—
"By the Atlantic"	2020	—	—	Pleasure & Pain
"Name Droppa"	2020	—	—	Pleasure & Pain

=== As featured artist ===
List of singles, with selected chart positions, showing year released and album name
Title	Year	Peak chart positions				Album
Title	Year	US	US R&B	CAN	UK	Album
"Hunt 4 U" (Teairra Marí featuring Pleasure P)	2009	—	—	—	—	Don't Make Me Cause a Scene
"Shone" (Flo Rida featuring Pleasure P)	2009	57	81	38	144	R.O.O.T.S.
"Aloha" (Fat Joe featuring Pleasure P and Rico Love)	2009	—	86	—	—	Jealous Ones Still Envy 2 (J.O.S.E. 2)
"Hands on You" (Juvenile featuring Pleasure P)	2009	—	—	—	—	Cocky & Confident
"—" denotes a recording that did not chart or was not released in that territory.
