= Teairra Mari discography =

Teairra Marí discography
- Studio albums: 1
- Extended plays: 3
- Singles: 11
- Music videos: 16

This is a comprehensive listing of official releases by Teairra Marí, an American R&B, pop and hip hop singer. Marí has released one studio album, three EPs, eleven singles and nine music videos, several of which were released through Def Jam and its sub-label Roc-A-Fella Records. In 2008, she signed to Warner Bros. Records but left and then signed with Rico Love's Division1 label.

Teairra Marí made her chart debut in 2005 with her first single "Make Her Feel Good", after signing with Def Jam and Roc-A-Fella. Her debut album Roc-A-Fella Records Presents Teairra Marí was released in 2005. The second single from the album was "No Daddy", which reached number 84 on the US R&B chart.

In 2008, Marí signed a record deal with Fo' Reel Entertainment and Warner Bros., and released the single titled "Hunt 4 You" featuring Pleasure P. She then followed this with the single "Cause a Scene" featuring Flo Rida, from her planned second album At That Point. The second single from the album, "Sponsor" featuring Gucci Mane and Soulja Boy, peaked at 25 on the US R&B chart. In 2011 Marí signed to Division1 and in 2012 released "U Did That", the lead single from her fifth mixtape Unfinished Business.

== Albums ==
=== Studio albums ===
List of albums, with selected chart positions, certifications and sales
Title	Details	Peak chart positions	
Title	Details	US	US R&B
Roc-A-Fella Records Presents Teairra Marí	Released: August 2, 2005; Label: Roc-A-Fella/Def Jam; Formats: CD, digital download	5	2

=== Mixtapes ===
Title	Details
Don't Make Me Cause a Scene	Released: May 28, 2009; Label: Fo' Reel; Format: Digital download
Point of No Return	Released: August 7, 2010; Label: Fo'Reel; Format: Digital download
The Night Before X-MAS	Released: December 24, 2010; Label: Warner Bros.; Format: Digital download
Now or Never	Released: May 30, 2011; Label: Division1; Format: Digital download
Unfinished Business	Released: July 9, 2012; Label: Division1; Format: Digital download

== EPs ==
Title	Details
Get Away	Released: October 2003; Label: K.I.S.S.; Formats: CD
Sincerely Yours	Released: August 17, 2010; Label: Fo' Reel, Asylum, Warner Bros.; Format: Digital download
Rehab	Released: June 1, 2019; Label: Redwork; Formats: Digital download, streaming

== Singles ==
=== As lead artist ===
Title	Year	Peak chart positions					Certification	Album
Title	Year	US	US R&B/HH	US R&B Airplay	US Airplay	US Rhythm	Certification	Album
"Make Her Feel Good"	2005	35	9	8	18	15		Roc-A-Fella Records Presents Teairra Marí
"No Daddy"	2005	—	84	—	—	—		Roc-A-Fella Records Presents Teairra Marí
"Phone Booth"	2005	—	—	—	—	—		Roc-A-Fella Records Presents Teairra Marí
"No No"	2008	—	—	—	—	—		Non-album singles
"Hunt 4 U" (featuring Pleasure P)	2008	—	—	—	—	—		Non-album singles
"Cause a Scene" (featuring Flo Rida)	2009	—	—	—	—	—		Non-album singles
"Automatic" (featuring Nicki Minaj)	2009	—	—	—	—	—		Non-album singles
"Sponsor" (featuring Gucci Mane and Soulja Boy)	2010	— (Note: "Sponsor" did not enter the Billboard Hot 100, but peaked at number 21 on the Bubbling Under Hot 100.)	25	25	—	—		Non-album singles
"Body"	2010	—	—	—	—	—		Non-album singles
"U Did That" (featuring 2 Chainz)	2012	—	—	—	—	—		Non-album singles
"Deserve"	2014	—	—	—	—	—		Rehab
"Bad"	2017	—	—	—	—	—		Rehab
"Baecation"	2018	—	—	—	—	—		Rehab
"Everybody"	2018	—	—	—	—	—		Rehab
"Rider"	2019	—	—	—	—	—		Non-album singles
"Take Me Out"	2024	—	—	—	—	—		Non-album singles
"—" denotes a title that did not chart or was not released in that territory.

=== As featured artist ===
Year	Song	Album
2006	"Preserve The Sexy" (LL Cool J featuring Teairra Marí)	Todd Smith
2007	"Sidekick" (Tone Tone featuring Teairra Marí)	D-Boy Fresh
2008	"Head Gone" (Candy Hill featuring Teairra Marí)	
2008	"Choose U" (Lil' Fizz featuring Teairra Marí)	
2008	"Did You Wrong (Remix)" (Pleasure P featuring Teairra Marí)	"Did You Wrong" (CD Single)
2008	"Tatted" (R$K featuring Teairra Marí)	
2008	"Like A Candle" (Mario featuring Teairra Marí)	Unreleased
2010	"Spot Right There" (New Boyz featuring Teairra Marí)	Too Cool To Care
2010	"Bosses" (Gucci Mane featuring Teairra Marí)	
2010	"Boy Shorts (Remix)" (Mr. Vegas featuring Teairra Marí & Gyptian)	
2011	"Black Bird" (Trina featuring Teairra Marí)	Diamonds Are Forever (Mixtape)
2011	"Slidin'" (Brianna featuring Teairra Marí)	Face Off (Mixtape)
2011	"That's All Me" (DJ T.Neal featuring Teairra Marí & Rico Love)	TBA
2013	"My Type" (Young Slee featuring Teairra Marí)	First Impression

== Music videos ==
Year	Title	Director(s)
2005	"Make Her Feel Good"	Ray Kay
2005	"No Daddy"	Jessy Terrero
2008	"Hunt 4 U"	Benny Boom
2009	"Cause a Scene"	Juwan Lee
2010	"Sponsor"	Yolande Geralds
2010	"Daddy's Home" (Usher cover)	Murray Mile
2010	"Over" (Drake cover)	Murray Mile
2010	"Automatic"	Murray Mile
2010	"My Lovin'" (Drake cover)	
2010	"Super High" (Rick Ross cover)	
2011	"Body"	Ryan Spencer
2011	"Stranger"	Eddie Tran
2011	"U Know What It Is" (Wiz Khalifa cover)	Ryan Spencer
2011	"Stay"	Nick Palmer
2011	"Pum Pum Shorts (Remix)" (w/ Mr. Vegas and Gyptian)	Jaakko Manninen
2011	"That's All Me" (w/ DJ T. Neal and Rico Love)	
2012	"Will 2 Win" (w/ Swerv and Cardan)	Swerv
2012	"U Did That" (w/ 2 Chainz)	David Rosseau
2013	"My Type" (w/ Young Slee)	Christian Strickland
2013	"Where This Light Goes" (w/ Tiffany Foxx, Angelina Pivarnick and Amoretta)	Tony Hanson

=== Video appearances ===
- Sammie "You Should Be My Girl"
- Jay-Z "Show Me What You Got"
- 3LW Featuring Jermaine Dupri "Feelin' You"
- Biggie "Nasty Girl"
- Ludacris Featuring Chris Brown & Sean Garrett "What Them Girls Like"
- Bow Wow Featuring Sean Kingston & DJ Khaled "For My Hood"
