= Michael B. Jordan =

American actor (born 1987)

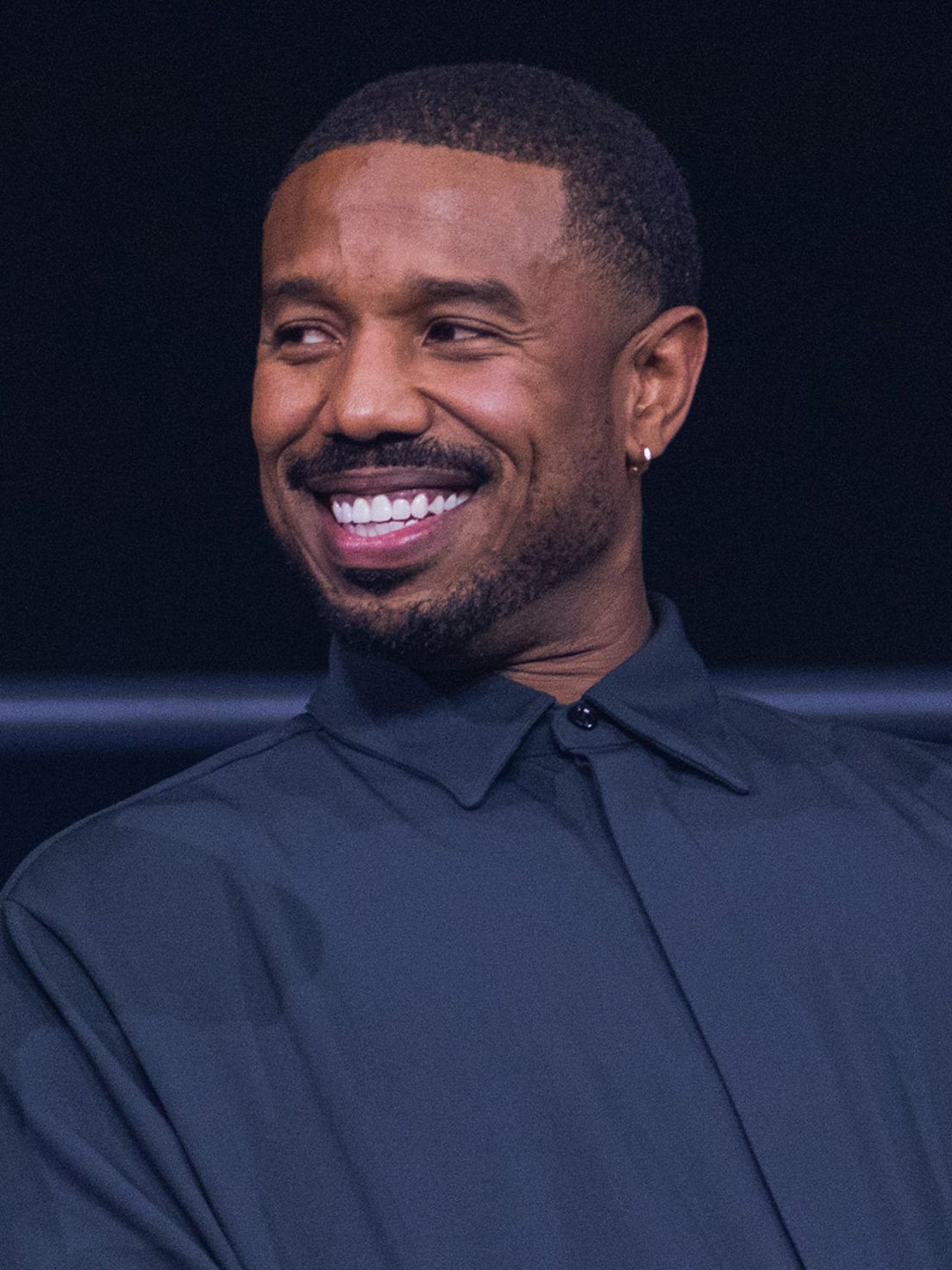
- Jordan in 2025
- Born: Michael Bakari Jordan; February 9, 1987 (age 39); Santa Ana, California, U.S.
- Occupations: Actor; director; producer
- Years active: 1999–present
- Awards: Full list

Michael Bakari Jordan (/bɑːˈkɑːri/ bah-KAR-ee; born February 9, 1987) is an American actor, producer, and director. His accolades include an Academy Award, three Actor Awards, and a Producers Guild Award, in addition to nominations for a British Academy Film Award, a Golden Globe Award and two Emmy Awards. Jordan was named one of the 100 most influential people in the world by Time in 2020 and 2023, People's Sexiest Man Alive in 2020, and in 2020 was ranked 15th on The New York Times list of the 25 greatest actors of the 21st century.

Jordan initially gained recognition in television, playing Wallace in the first season of the HBO crime drama series The Wire (2002). He starred in the ABC soap opera All My Children (2003–2006) and the NBC sports drama series Friday Night Lights (2009–2011). He later starred in and produced the HBO television film Fahrenheit 451 (2018), for which he was nominated for the Primetime Emmy Award for Outstanding Television Movie.

Jordan's film breakthrough came as Oscar Grant in Ryan Coogler's biopic Fruitvale Station (2013), his performance in which received critical praise. He earned further acclaim for his performances in Coogler's subsequent films, including Creed (2015), Black Panther (2018), and Sinners (2025); the latter earned him the Academy Award for Best Actor. Jordan reprised his role of Donnie Creed in Creed II (2018) and Creed III (2023), the latter of which also marked his directorial debut. His other films include Chronicle (2012), That Awkward Moment (2014), Fantastic Four (2015), and Just Mercy (2019).

== Early life and education ==
Michael Bakari Jordan was born on February 9, 1987, in Santa Ana, California, to Donna and Michael A. Jordan, a supervisor at the John F. Kennedy International Airport who later started a catering business and was involved in Pan-Africanism. He has an older sister and a younger brother. His family lived in Santa Ana for two years before moving to Newark, New Jersey, where Jordan grew up. He attended Newark Arts High School, where his mother worked as a teacher, and where he also played basketball.

== Career ==
=== 1999–2012: Beginnings ===
Jordan worked as a child model for several companies and brands, including Modell's Sporting Goods and Toys "R" Us, before deciding to embark on a career as an actor. He launched his career as a professional actor in 1999, when he appeared briefly in single episodes of the television series Cosby and The Sopranos. His first principal film role followed in 2001, when he was featured in Hardball, which starred Keanu Reeves. In 2002, he gained more attention by playing the small but pivotal role of Wallace in the first season of HBO's The Wire.

In March 2003, he joined the cast of All My Children, replacing Chadwick Boseman, playing Reggie Montgomery, a troubled teenager, until June 2006, when Jordan was released from his contract. Jordan's other credits include guest-starring appearances on CSI: Crime Scene Investigation, Without a Trace, and Cold Case. Thereafter, he had a lead role in the independent film Blackout and starred in The Assistants on The-N. In 2008, Jordan appeared in the music video "Did You Wrong" by rhythm and blues artist Pleasure P.

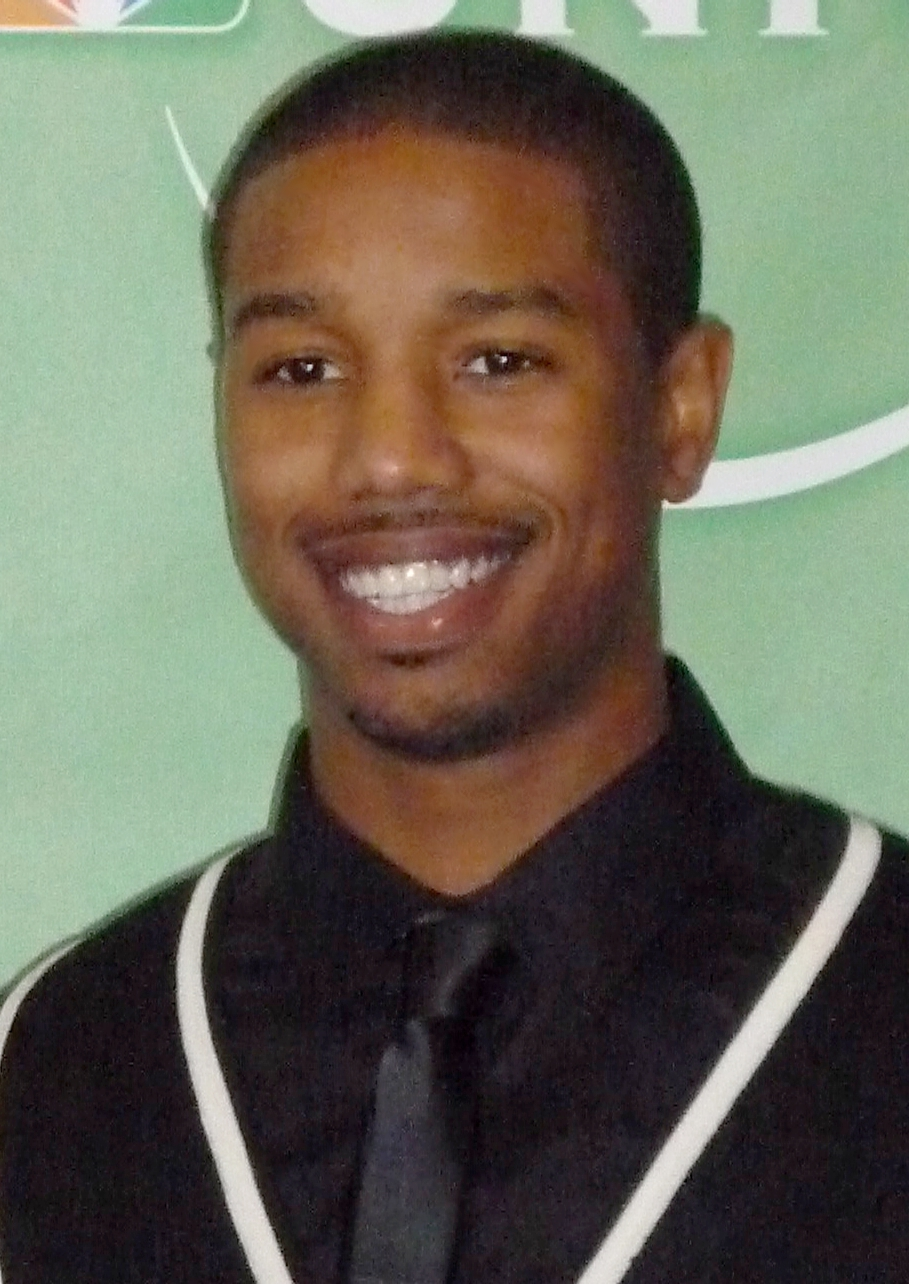
Jordan in 2011

In 2009, Jordan began starring in the NBC drama Friday Night Lights as quarterback Vince Howard, and lived in an apartment in Austin, where the show was filmed. He played the character for two seasons until the show ended in 2011. In 2009, he guest-starred on Burn Notice in the episode "Hot Spot", playing a high-school football player who got into a fight and is being hunted by a local gangster. In 2010, he was considered one of the 55 faces of the future by Nylon in its "Young Hollywood" issue.

In 2010, he guest-starred in the Law & Order: Criminal Intent episode "Inhumane Society", as a boxer involved in a Michael Vick–inspired dog-fighting scandal. That year, he landed a recurring role on the NBC show Parenthood playing Alex (Haddie Braverman's love interest). This marked his second collaboration with showrunner Jason Katims, who was in charge of Friday Night Lights. BuddyTV ranked him number 80 on its list of "TV's Sexiest Men of 2011". Jordan voiced Jace in the Xbox 360 game Gears of War 3. In 2012, Jordan appeared in the George Lucas-produced film Red Tails, and played lead character Steve Montgomery in Chronicle, a film about three teenaged boys who develop superhuman abilities. He also guest-starred in an episode of House's final season, playing a blind patient.

=== 2013–2018: Rise to prominence ===
In 2013, Jordan starred as shooting victim Oscar Grant in Fruitvale Station, directed by Ryan Coogler. His performance garnered critical acclaim, with Todd McCarthy of The Hollywood Reporter stating that Jordan reminded him of "a young Denzel Washington". Following his role in Fruitvale Station, Jordan was named an "actor to watch" by People and Variety. Time magazine named him, with Coogler, one of 30 people under 30 who are changing the world, and he was also named one of 2013's breakout stars by Entertainment Weekly and GQ.

In 2015, he starred as Johnny Storm, the Human Torch, in Fantastic Four. The film was universally panned by critics, holding a 9% approval rating on Rotten Tomatoes, and was a bust at the box office. Jordan rebounded with critical acclaim later that year when he starred as Donnie Creed, the son of boxer Apollo Creed, in the spinoff of the Rocky film, Creed, his second collaboration with Coogler, which co-starred Sylvester Stallone. Jordan prepared for his role as a boxer in Creed by undertaking one year of rigorous physical training and a stringent, low-fat diet. He did not have a body double during filming, and was "routinely bloodied, bruised, and dizzy" when fighting scenes were being filmed.

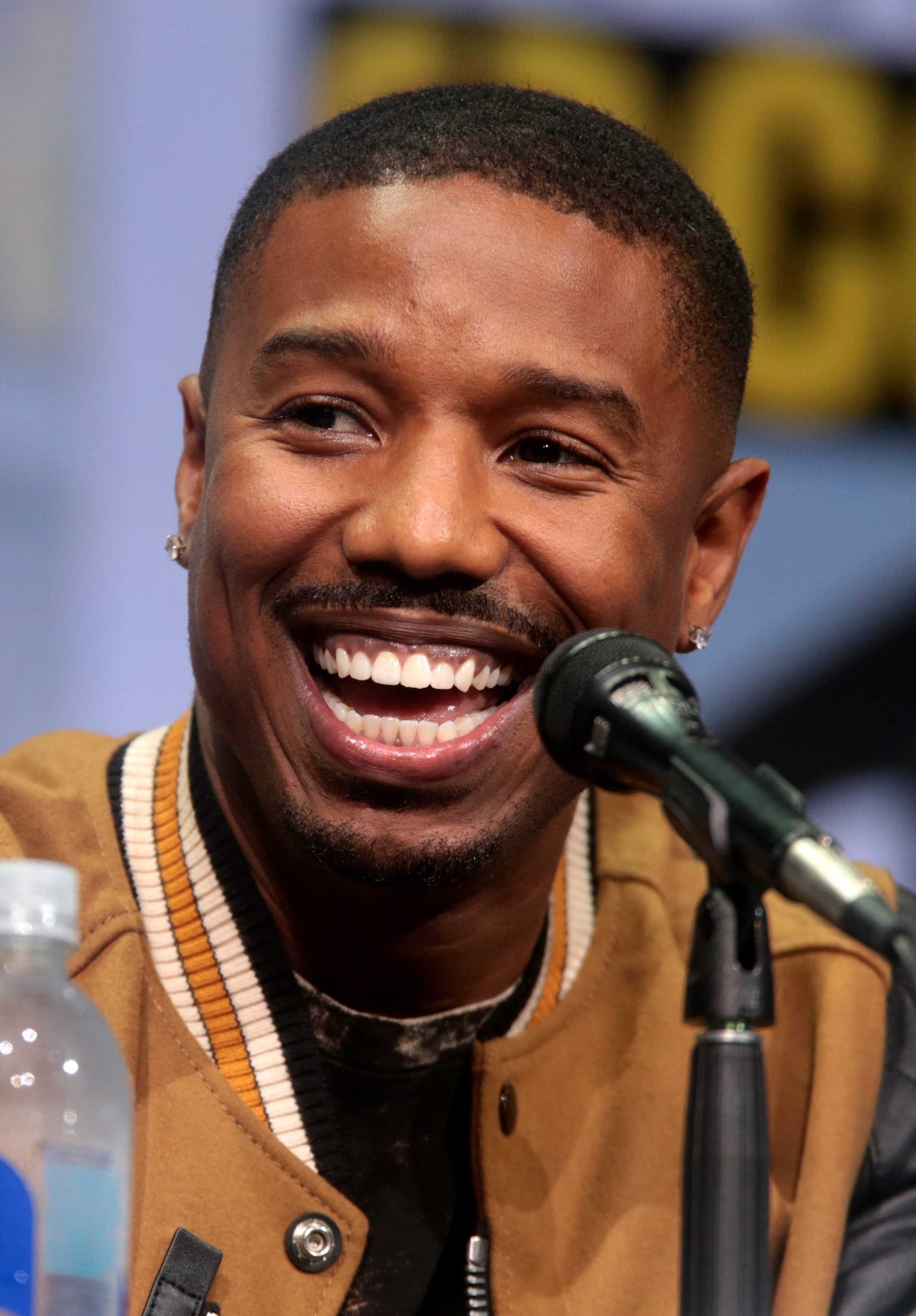
Jordan promoting Black Panther at the 2017 San Diego Comic-Con

In 2016, Jordan featured in the popular sports game NBA 2K17, portraying Justice Young, a teammate of the player-character in the game's MyCareer mode. In October 2017, Jordan was announced as being cast in a supporting role as Mark Warren in the upcoming Netflix superhero series Raising Dion. In February 2018, Jordan starred as the villain Erik Killmonger in the Marvel Cinematic Universe film Black Panther; this marked Jordan's third collaboration with Coogler. His performance in Black Panther received critical acclaim, with Dani Di Placido of Forbes stating that Jordan "steals the show", while Jason Guerrasio of Business Insider wrote that the actor "plays a Killmonger fueled with hate and emptiness – we won't give away why – but he also delivers it with a swagger that's just a joy to watch ... the movie takes off more in story and viewing enjoyment whenever Jordan is on screen." In an interview with The Hollywood Reporter, Jordan shared how his preparation for the role of Killmonger left an impact on him, for which he sought out therapy.

Later in 2018, Jordan starred in Fahrenheit 451 with Michael Shannon and Sofia Boutella. The television film was distributed on HBO by HBO Films. That same year, Jordan reprised his role as boxer Adonis "Donnie" Creed in Creed II, a sequel to Creed (2015) and the eighth installment in the Rocky film series. Creed II was released in the United States by Metro-Goldwyn-Mayer on November 21, 2018. The film received generally positive reviews from critics, and it went on to debut to $35.3 million in its opening weekend (a five-day total of $55.8 million), marking the biggest debut ever for a live-action release over Thanksgiving.

=== 2019–present: Established actor and awards success ===
He also voiced the character Julian Chase in Rooster Teeth's animated series Gen:Lock, since January 2019, which he also co-produced through his production company, Outlier Society Productions. Jordan portrayed attorney Bryan Stevenson in a legal drama, Just Mercy, which he also co-produced. The film, based on a real-life story, was released in December 2019 to positive reviews. Jordan starred in Without Remorse, based on the book by Tom Clancy, as John Kelly, a former Navy SEAL and director of the elite counterterrorism unit Rainbow Six. Originally planned for release on September 18, 2020, it was released on April 30, 2021, due to the COVID-19 pandemic.

Jordan reprised his Marvel role as Erik "Killmonger" Stevens in two episodes of the first season of What If...? (2021), and in Black Panther: Wakanda Forever (2022), and made a cameo appearance in Space Jam: A New Legacy (2021). He also starred in A Journal for Jordan (2021), directed by Denzel Washington, as a soldier who "kept a journal full of poignant life lessons for their newborn son, Jordan, while deployed overseas." Jordan made his directorial debut with Creed III, a sequel to Creed II, in addition to producing and reprising his starring role as boxer Adonis "Donnie" Creed. It was released on March 3, 2023. He next reteamed with Coogler in the period horror film Sinners (2025), playing twin brothers in a dual role performance. He received the Academy Award for Best Actor and the Actor Award in the same category, becoming the seventh Black performer in history to win an Oscar in the lead acting category.

Jordan is slated to work with Coogler for the fifth time in Wrong Answer, a film based on the Atlanta Public Schools cheating scandal. He is also set to direct, produce, and star in a second remake of The Thomas Crown Affair, as well as starring in the vampire film Blood Brothers. His production company Outlier Society signed a first-look deal with Amazon, and is also developing Val-Zod, an HBO Max series featuring a black version of the DC Comics character Superman. As of March 2022, Jordan was to produce and star in the sequel of I Am Legend with Will Smith.

In March 2026, Prime Video has officially ordered Delphi, a new Michael B. Jordan–produced drama series set in the Rocky/Creed universe that follows young fighters training at the iconic Delphi Boxing Academy from the films.

In April 2026, Jordan is announced to produce and may star in the film adaptation of the Electronic Arts video game, Battlefield. He was also cast alongside Austin Butler in Miami Vice '85, where he'll be playing Ricardo Tubbs.

In May 2026, Deadline announced Jordan will be executive producing the adaptation of Rebecca Yarros' bestselling novel Fourth Wing is moving forward with a series order by Prime Video.

== Personal life ==
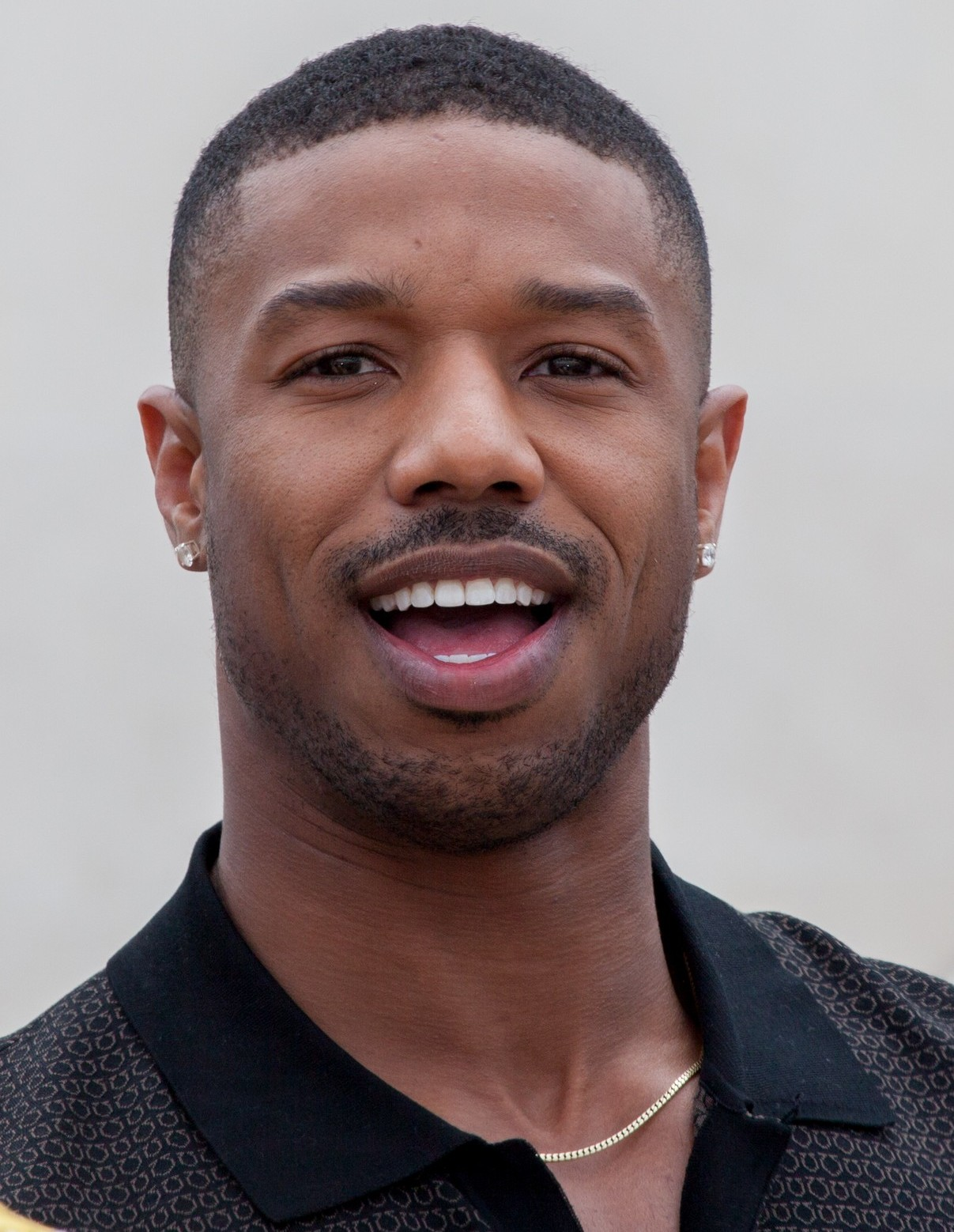
Jordan in 2018

Jordan has resided in Los Angeles since 2006. He grew up in a religious household and considers himself to be spiritual. As of 2018, he lived with his parents in a Sherman Oaks home that he purchased.

Jordan is a fan of anime, citing Naruto: Shippuden and the Dragon Ball franchise as his favorite series and Princess Mononoke as his favorite film. Having grown up in Newark, New Jersey, he is a lifelong supporter of the New York Giants. He is also a supporter of Premier League club Everton FC.

Michael B. Jordan considers Tom Cruise and Will Smith his career idols, citing their ability to build global careers and become movie stars. Jordan has also sought advice from Smith and Cruise and has received endorsements from Cruise, indicating a mentorship and respect among the three actors.

Jordan cites Ryan Coogler, Steven Spielberg, Martin Scorsese, Alejandro G. Iñárritu, Stanley Kubrick, Alfonso Cuarón, George Lucas, and Christopher Nolan as his influences in film making.

In November 2020, Jordan began dating model Lori Harvey, adoptive daughter of television personality Steve Harvey. In June 2022, the couple announced they had ended their relationship.

In December 2023, Jordan wrecked his Ferrari 812 Superfast when he crashed it into a parked Kia on Sunset Boulevard while racing a Ferrari 488. He was uninjured and police investigated the incident for street racing. Another driver who was near the incident said they were "pacing" but insists they were not racing. Jordan was eventually not charged "due to lack of evidence". His 812 was later bought by Youtuber TheStradman in March 2024.

=== Sports ownership ===
In December 2022, Jordan was announced as part-owner of English soccer club AFC Bournemouth. The club was taken over by the consortium group the Black Knights Football Club, led by fellow American businessman Bill Foley. Jordan led the minority ownership group with Kosmos founder Nullah Sarker.

He is also an investor in the Alpine F1 Team alongside fellow actors Ryan Reynolds and Rob McElhenney.

== Performances and works ==
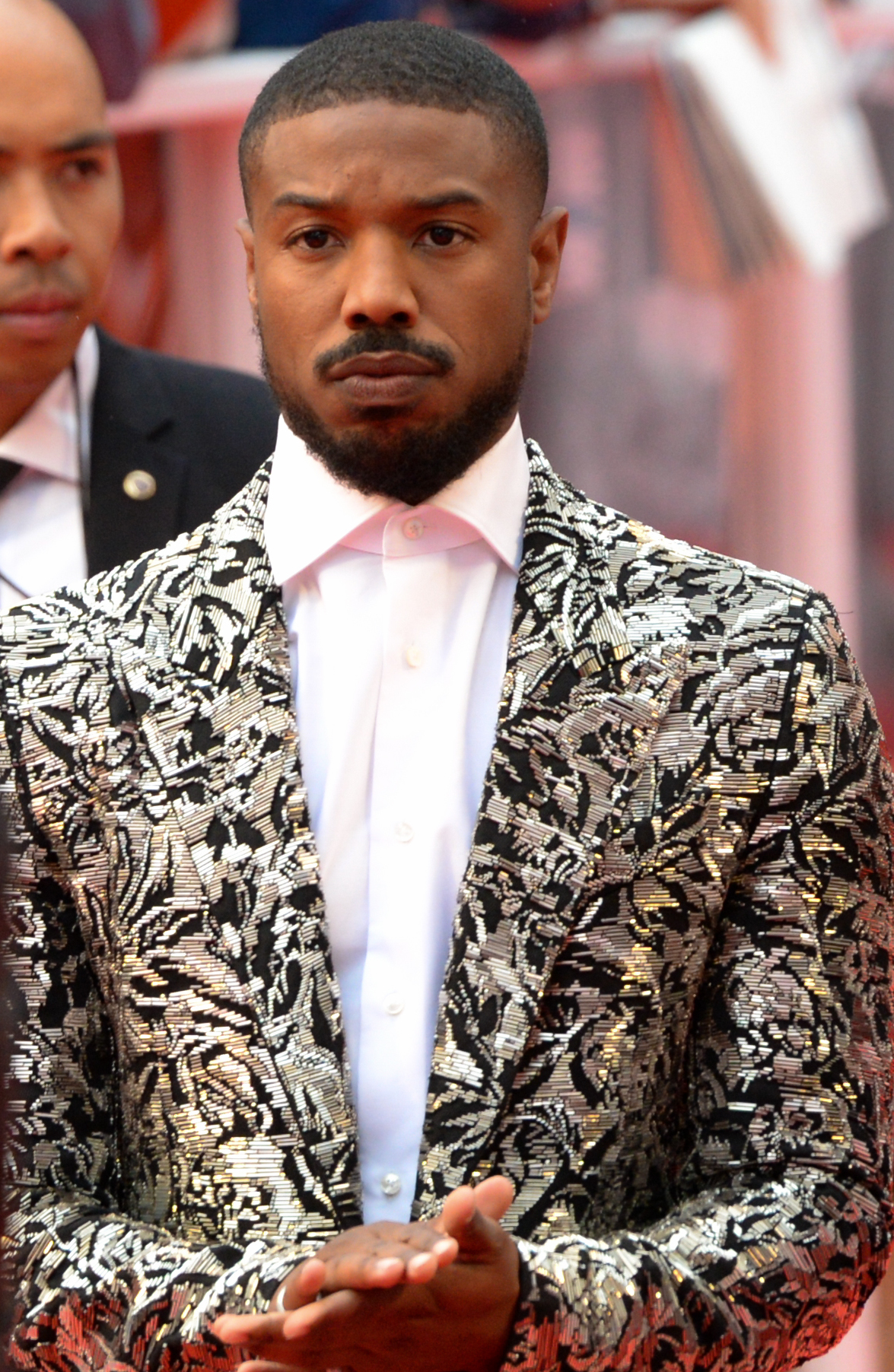
Jordan at the 2019 Toronto International Film Festival

=== Film ===
Key
†	Denotes films that have not yet been released

Year	Title	Role	Notes
1999	Black and White	Teen #2	
2001	Hardball	Jamal	
2007	Blackout	C.J.	
2009	Pastor Brown	Tariq Brown	
2012	Red Tails	Flight Officer Maurice "Bumps" Wilson	
2012	Chronicle	Steve Montgomery	
2012	Hotel Noir	Leon	
2013	Fruitvale Station	Oscar Grant	
2013	Justice League: The Flashpoint Paradox	Victor Stone / Cyborg (voice)	
2014	That Awkward Moment	Mikey	
2015	Fantastic Four	Johnny Storm / Human Torch	
2015	Creed	Adonis "Donnie" Johnson	
2018	Black Panther	Erik Killmonger	
2018	Fahrenheit 451	Guy Montag	Also executive producer
2018	Kin	Male Cleaner	Cameo, also executive producer
2018	Creed II	Adonis "Donnie" Johnson	Also executive producer
2019	Just Mercy	Bryan Stevenson	Also producer
2021	Without Remorse	John Kelly / "John Clark"	Also producer
2021	Space Jam: A New Legacy	Himself	Cameo
2021	A Journal for Jordan	Charles Monroe King	Also producer
2022	Black Panther: Wakanda Forever	Erik Killmonger	Cameo
2023	Creed III	Adonis "Donnie" Creed	Also director & producer
2025	Sinners	Elijah "Smoke" Moore / Elias "Stack" Moore	
2026	Swapped	Ollie (voice)	
2027	The Thomas Crown Affair †	Thomas Crown	Post-production, also director & producer
2028	Miami Vice '85 †	Ricardo Tubbs	Filming

=== Television ===
Year	Title	Role	Notes	Ref.
1999	The Sopranos	Rideland Kid	Episode: "Down Neck"	
1999	Cosby	Michael	Episode: "The Vesey Method"	
2002	The Wire	Wallace	Recurring role; 12 episodes (season 1)	
2003–2006	All My Children	Reggie Porter Montgomery	Recurring role; 59 episodes	
2006	CSI: Crime Scene Investigation	Morris	Episode: "Poppin' Tags"	
2006	Without a Trace	Jesse Lewis	Episode: "The Calm Before"	
2007	Cold Case	Michael Carter	Episode: "Wunderkind"	
2009	Burn Notice	Corey Jensen	Episode: "Hot Spot"	
2009	Bones	Perry Wilson	Episode: "The Plain in the Prodigy"	
2009	The Assistants	Nate Warren	Main role; 13 episodes	
2009–2011	Friday Night Lights	Vince Howard	Main role; 26 episodes (seasons 4–5)	
2010	Law & Order: Criminal Intent	Danny Ford	Episode: "Inhumane Society"	
2010	Lie to Me	Key	Episodes: "Smoked" & "Killer App"	
2010–2011	Parenthood	Alex	Recurring role; 16 episodes (seasons 2–3)	
2012	House	Will Westwood	Episode: "Love Is Blind"	
2012	County	Travis	Television film	
2014	The Boondocks	Pretty Boy Flizzy	Voice role; Episode: "Pretty Boy Flizzy"	
2019–2021	Gen:Lock	Julian Chase / Nemesis / King Demon	Voice role; 16 episodes (also executive producer)	
2019–2021	Raising Dion	Mark Warren	Recurring role; 3 episodes (season 1, also executive producer)	
2021	Love, Death & Robots	Terence	Voice & motion capture; Episode: "Life Hutch"	
2021	What If...?	Erik Killmonger	Voice role; Episodes: "What If... Killmonger Rescued Tony Stark?" & "What If... the Watcher Broke His Oath?"	
2022	America the Beautiful	Narrator	Documentary series	
2023	Saturday Night Live	Himself (host)	Episode: "Michael B. Jordan / Lil Baby"	

=== Video games ===
Year	Title	Voice role	Notes	Ref.
2011	Gears of War 3	Jace Stratton		
2016	NBA 2K17	Justice Young / Himself	Host on MyCareer mode	
2017	Wilson's Heart	Kurt Mosby		
2018	Creed: Rise to Glory	Adonis Creed		

=== Music video appearances ===
Year	Title	Performer(s)	Album	Refs.
2008	"Did You Wrong"	Pleasure P	The Introduction of Marcus Cooper	
2017	"Family Feud"	Jay-Z featuring Beyoncé	4:44	
2019	"Whoa"	Snoh Aalegra	Ugh, Those Feels Again	

== See also ==
- List of actors with Academy Award nominations
- List of black Academy Award winners and nominees
