= List of awards and nominations received by Michael B. Jordan =

Michael B. Jordan awards and nominations
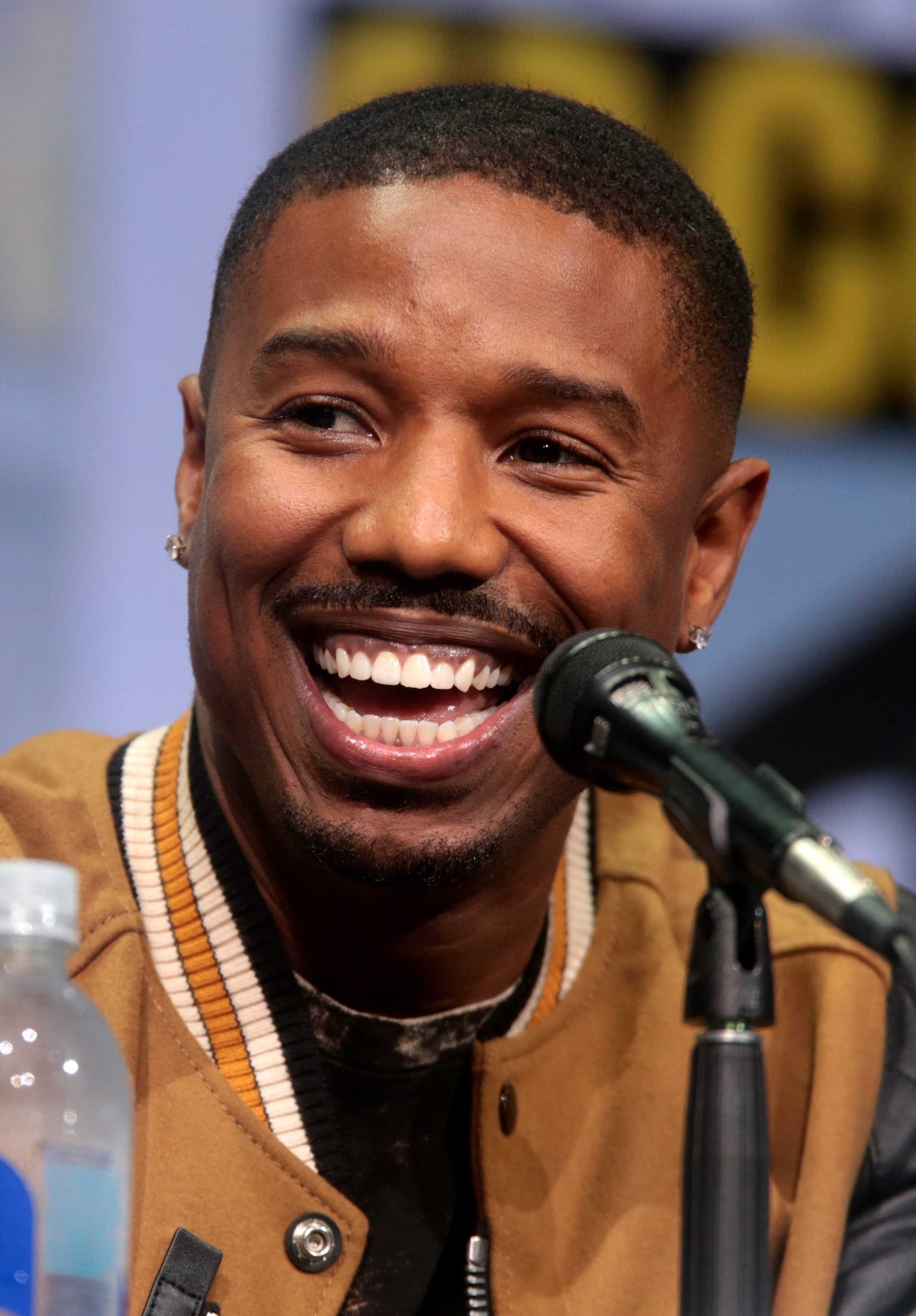
- Jordan promoting Black Panther at the 2017 San Diego Comic-Con
Awards and nominations
Award	Wins	Nominations
Academy Awards	1	1
Actor Awards	3	3
BAFTA Awards	0	1
Critics' Choice Awards	2	5
Emmy Awards	0	2
Golden Globe Awards	0	1
Producers Guild of America Awards	1	1

Totals (Note: Certain award groups do not simply award one winner. They acknowledge several different recipients, have runners-up, and have third place. Since this is a specific recognition and is different from losing an award, runner-up mentions are considered wins in this award tally. For simplification and to avoid errors, each award in this list has been presumed to have had a prior nomination.)
- Wins: 58
- Nominations: 133

The following is a list of awards and nominations received by American actor Michael B. Jordan.

Jordan initially broke out in television, playing Reggie Montgomery in the ABC soap opera All My Children, for which he received three consecutive nominations for the NAACP Image Award for Outstanding Actor in a Daytime Drama Series.

Jordan is known for his collaborations with Ryan Coogler. Jordan first gained recognition for his performance in Coogler's feature film debut Fruitvale Station (2013), including the National Board of Review Award for Breakthrough Performance and a nomination for the Independent Spirit Award for Best Male Lead. Two years later, Coogler and Jordan reunited for the first Rocky spinoff film Creed (2015). For his performance, Jordan won the NAACP Image Award for Outstanding Actor in a Motion Picture and the Black Reel Award for Outstanding Actor. For his performance as Erik Killmonger in Coogler's superhero film Black Panther (2018), Jordan won the NAACP Image Award for Outstanding Supporting Actor in a Motion Picture and the Black Reel Award for Outstanding Supporting Actor, and was nominated for Critics' Choice Movie Award for Best Supporting Actor.

For television, Jordan has received accolades for producing as well as acting. He was nominated for the Primetime Emmy Award for Outstanding Television Movie and the Children's and Family Emmy Award for Outstanding Preschool, Children's or Family Viewing Series as a producer of Fahrenheit 451 (2018) and Raising Dion (2022) respectively.

In 2025, Jordan once again collaborated with Ryan Coogler on the American horror film Sinners. His performance garnered critical acclaim, earning him the Academy Award and Actor Award for Best Actor, as well as nominations for the BAFTA Award for Best Actor in a Leading Role and the Golden Globe Award for Best Actor in a Motion Picture – Drama.

== Major associations ==
=== Academy Awards ===
Year	Category	Nominated work	Result	Ref.
2026	Best Actor	Sinners	Won	

=== Actor Awards ===
Year	Category	Nominated work	Result	Ref.
2019	Outstanding Cast in a Motion Picture	Black Panther	Won (Note: Shared with the cast of Black Panther)	
2026	Outstanding Cast in a Motion Picture	Sinners	Won (Note: Shared with the cast of Sinners)	
2026	Outstanding Male Actor in a Leading Role	Sinners	Won	

=== BAFTA Awards ===
Year	Category	Nominated work	Result	Ref.
British Academy Film Awards
2026	Best Actor in a Leading Role	Sinners	Nominated	

=== Critics' Choice Awards ===
Year	Category	Nominated work	Result	Ref.
Critics' Choice Movie Awards
2019	Best Supporting Actor	Black Panther	Nominated	
2019	Best Acting Ensemble	Black Panther	Nominated	
2026	Best Actor	Sinners	Nominated	
Critics' Choice Super Awards
2025	Best Actor in a Horror Movie	Sinners	Won	
Celebration of Cinema and Television
2022	Melvin Van Peebles Trailblazer Award	—N/a	Won	

=== Emmy Awards ===
Year	Category	Nominated work	Result	Ref.
Primetime Emmy Awards
2018	Outstanding Television Movie	Fahrenheit 451	Nominated (Note: As Producer)	
Children's and Family Emmy Awards
2022	Outstanding Children's or Family Viewing Series	Raising Dion	Nominated	

=== Golden Globe Awards ===
Year	Category	Nominated work	Result	Ref.
2026	Best Actor in a Motion Picture - Drama	Sinners	Nominated	

=== Producers Guild of America Awards ===
Year	Category	Nominated work	Result	Ref.
2019	Best Streamed or Televised Movie	Fahrenheit 451	Won	

== Other awards ==
=== Black Reel Awards ===
Year	Category	Nominated work	Result	Ref.
2014	Outstanding Actor	Fruitvale Station	Nominated	
2016	Outstanding Actor	Creed	Won	
2018	Outstanding Actor, TV Movie/Limited Series	Fahrenheit 451	Won	
2019	Outstanding Actor	Creed II	Nominated	
2019	Outstanding Supporting Actor	Black Panther	Won	
2020	Outstanding Guest Actor, Drama Series	Raising Dion	Nominated	
2024	Outstanding Director	Creed III	Nominated	
2024	Outstanding Lead Performance	Creed III	Nominated	
2026	Outstanding Lead Performance	Sinners	Won	
2026	Outstanding Ensemble	Sinners	Won	

=== Golden Raspberry Awards ===
Year	Category	Nominated work	Result	Ref.
2016	Worst Screen Combo	Fantastic Four	Nominated (Note: Shared with Jamie Bell, Kate Mara, and Miles Teller)	

=== Gotham Awards ===
Year	Category	Nominated work	Result	Ref.
2013	Breakthrough Actor	Fruitvale Station	Won	
2019	Breakthrough Series - Long Form	David Makes Man	Nominated	
2025	Ensemble Tribute	Sinners	Honored	

=== Independent Spirit Awards ===
Year	Category	Nominated work	Result	Ref.
2014	Best Male Lead	Fruitvale Station	Nominated	

=== Irish Film & Television Awards ===
Year	Category	Nominated work	Result	Ref.
2026	Best International Actor	Sinners	Nominated	

=== NAACP Image Awards ===
Year	Category	Nominated work	Result	Ref.
2005	Outstanding Actor in a Daytime Drama Series	All My Children	Nominated	
2006	Outstanding Actor in a Daytime Drama Series	All My Children	Nominated	
2007	Outstanding Actor in a Daytime Drama Series	All My Children	Nominated	
2014	Outstanding Actor in a Motion Picture	Fruitvale Station	Nominated	
2016	Outstanding Actor in a Motion Picture	Creed	Won	
2016	Entertainer of the Year	—N/a	Won	
2019	Outstanding Actor in a Motion Picture	Creed II	Nominated	
2019	Outstanding Supporting Actor in a Motion Picture	Black Panther	Won	
2019	Outstanding Actor in a Television Movie, Limited-Series or Dramatic Special	Fahrenheit 451	Won	
2024	Outstanding Directing in a Motion Picture	Creed III	Nominated	
2024	Outstanding Soundtrack/Compilation Album	Creed III	Nominated	
2024	Outstanding Guest Performance in a Comedy or Drama Series	Saturday Night Live	Won	
2026	Outstanding Actor in a Motion Picture	Sinners	Won	
2026	Outstanding Ensemble Cast in a Motion Picture	Sinners	Won	
2026	Entertainer of the Year	—N/a	Won	

=== National Board of Review ===
Year	Category	Nominated work	Result	Ref.
2013	Breakthrough Actor	Fruitvale Station	Won	

=== People's Choice Awards ===
Year	Category	Nominated work	Result	Ref.
2024	The Drama Movie Star of the Year	Creed III	Nominated	
2024	The Male Movie Star of the Year	Creed III	Nominated	

=== Satellite Awards ===
Year	Category	Nominated work	Result	Ref.
2014	Newcomer Award	Fruitvale Station	Won	
2026	Best Actor in a Motion Picture - Drama	Sinners	Nominated	

=== Saturn Awards ===
Year	Category	Nominated work	Result	Ref.
2018	Best Supporting Actor	Black Panther	Nominated	
2026	Best Actor	Sinners	Nominated	

== Other associations ==
Award	Year	Category	Nominated work	Result	Ref.
African-American Film Critics Association	2016	Breakthrough Performance	Creed	Won	
African-American Film Critics Association	2026	Best Actor	Sinners	Won	
Alliance of Women Film Journalists	2019	Best Actor in a Supporting Role	Black Panther	Nominated	
Alliance of Women Film Journalists	2019	Best Ensemble Cast – Casting Director	Black Panther	Won	
Alliance of Women Film Journalists	2025	Best Actor	Sinners	Won	
Alliance of Women Film Journalists	2025	Best Ensemble Cast – Casting Director	Sinners	Won	
Astra Film Awards	2024	Best First Feature	Creed III	Nominated	
Astra Film Awards	2025	Best Actor - Drama	Sinners	Won	
Astra Film Awards	2025	Best Ensemble Cast	Sinners	Won	
Astra Midseason Movie Awards	2018	Best Supporting Actor	Black Panther	Nominated	
Astra Midseason Movie Awards	2023	Best Actor	Creed III	Nominated	
Astra Midseason Movie Awards	2025	Best Actor	Sinners	Won	
Austin Film Critics Association	2015	Best Actor	Creed	Nominated	
Austin Film Critics Association	2019	Best Supporting Actor	Black Panther	Nominated	
Austin Film Critics Association	2019	Best Ensemble	Black Panther	Nominated	
Austin Film Critics Association	2025	Best Actor	Sinners	Nominated	
Austin Film Critics Association	2025	Best Ensemble	Sinners	Won	
Austin Film Critics Association	2025	The Dual Threat Special Award	Sinners	Won	
Boston Online Film Critics Association	2025	Best Ensemble	Sinners	Won	
Chicago Film Critics Association	2018	Best Supporting Actor	Black Panther	Nominated	
Chicago Film Critics Association	2025	Best Actor	Sinners	Nominated	
Dallas-Fort Worth Film Critics Association	2018	Best Supporting Actor	Black Panther	5th place	
Dallas-Fort Worth Film Critics Association	2025	Best Actor	Sinners	3rd place	
Detroit Film Critics Society	2013	Breakthrough Performance	Fruitvale Station	Nominated	
Dorian Awards	2019	Film Performance of the Year - Supporting Actor	Black Panther	Nominated	
Dorian Awards	2026	Film Performance of the Year	Sinners	Nominated	
Dublin Film Critics' Circle	2025	Best Actor	Sinners	Won	
Fangoria Chainsaw Awards	2025	Best Lead Performance	Sinners	Nominated	
Florida Film Critics Circle	2013	Pauline Kael Breakout Award	Fruitvale Station	Runner-up	
Florida Film Critics Circle	2025	Best Ensemble	Sinners	Won	
Georgia Film Critics Association	2016	Best Actor	Creed	Nominated	
Georgia Film Critics Association	2018	Best Ensemble	Black Panther	Nominated	
Georgia Film Critics Association	2024	Oglethorpe Award for Excellence in Georgia Cinema	Creed III	Nominated	
Georgia Film Critics Association	2025	Best Actor	Sinners	Runner-up	
Georgia Film Critics Association	2025	Best Ensemble	Sinners	Runner-up	
Houston Film Critics Society	2019	Best Supporting Actor	Black Panther	Nominated	
Houston Film Critics Society	2026	Best Actor	Sinners	Won	
Houston Film Critics Society	2026	Best Ensemble	Sinners	Won	
IndieWire Critics Poll	2015	Best Lead Actor	Creed	3rd place	
IndieWire Critics Poll	2025	Best Performance	Sinners	6th place	
Kansas City Film Critics Circle	2025	Best Actor	Sinners	Won	
Las Vegas Film Critics Society	2025	Best Actor	Sinners	Nominated	
Las Vegas Film Critics Society	2025	Best Ensemble	Sinners	Nominated	
London Film Critics' Circle	2019	Supporting Actor of the Year	Black Panther	Nominated	
National Society of Film Critics	2016	Best Actor	Creed	Won	
National Society of Film Critics	2026	Best Actor	Sinners	3rd place	
New York Film Critics Online	2025	Best Actor	Sinners	Nominated	
New York Film Critics Online	2025	Best Ensemble Cast	Sinners	Won	
Online Film Critics Society	2015	Best Actor	Creed	Nominated	
Online Film Critics Society	2019	Best Supporting Actor	Black Panther	Won	
Online Film Critics Society	2026	Best Actor	Sinners	Won	
Online Film Critics Society	2026	Best Ensemble & Casting	Sinners	Won	
San Diego Film Critics Society	2025	Best Actor	Sinners	Won	
San Diego Film Critics Society	2025	Best Ensemble	Sinners	Runner-up	
San Francisco Bay Area Film Critics Circle	2018	Best Supporting Actor	Black Panther	Won	
San Francisco Bay Area Film Critics Circle	2025	Best Actor	Sinners	Nominated	
Seattle Film Critics Society	2016	Best Actor in a Leading Role	Creed	Nominated	
Seattle Film Critics Society	2025	Best Actor in a Leading Role	Sinners	Nominated	
Seattle Film Critics Society	2025	Best Ensemble Cast	Sinners	Nominated	
Soap Opera Digest Awards	2005	Favorite Teen	All My Children	Nominated	
Southeastern Film Critics Association	2025	Best Actor	Sinners	Won	
Southeastern Film Critics Association	2025	Best Ensemble	Sinners	Won	
St. Louis Film Critics Association	2013	Best Actor	Fruitvale Station	Nominated	
St. Louis Film Critics Association	2018	Best Supporting Actor	Black Panther	Nominated	
St. Louis Film Critics Association	2025	Best Actor	Sinners	Nominated	
St. Louis Film Critics Association	2025	Best Ensemble	Sinners	Nominated	
Teen Choice Awards	2016	Choice Movie Actor: Drama	Creed	Nominated	
Teen Choice Awards	2018	Choice Movie Villain	Black Panther	Won	
Teen Choice Awards	2018	Choice Fight	Black Panther	Won (Note: Shared with Chadwick Boseman)	
Toronto Film Critics Association	2018	Best Supporting Actor	Black Panther	Nominated	
Toronto Film Critics Association	2025	Outstanding Lead Performance	Sinners	Runner-up	
Village Voice Film Poll	2013	Best Actor	Fruitvale Station	7th place	
Village Voice Film Poll	2015	Best Actor	Creed	2nd place	
Washington D.C. Area Film Critics Association	2018	Best Supporting Actor	Black Panther	Nominated	
Washington D.C. Area Film Critics Association	2018	Best Ensemble	Black Panther	Nominated	
Washington D.C. Area Film Critics Association	2025	Best Actor	Sinners	Won	
Washington D.C. Area Film Critics Association	2025	Best Ensemble	Sinners	Won	
Women Film Critics Circle	2013	Best Actor	Fruitvale Station	Nominated	
Women Film Critics Circle	2025	Best Actor	Sinners	2nd place	
Women Film Critics Circle	2025	Best Screen Couple	Sinners	Won (Note: Shared with Wunmi Mosaku)	
Young Hollywood Awards	2014	Fan Favorite Actor–Male	—N/a	Nominated	
Young Hollywood Awards	2014	Best Threesome	That Awkward Moment	Nominated (Note: Shared with Zac Efron and Miles Teller)	
