= Under (Pleasure P song) =

Single by Pleasure P

from the album The Introduction of Marcus Cooper
- Released: May 10, 2009
- Recorded: 2009
- Genre: R&B
- Length: 3:51
- Label: Atlantic, Bluestar, Swagga Ent.
- Songwriters: D. Babbs, Lonny Bereal, M. Cooper, A. Dixon, J. Franklin, T. Jones, R. Newt & K. Stephens
- Producer: Durrell Babbs

Pleasure P singles chronology
| "Hunt 4 U" (2009) | "Under" (2009) | "I Love Girls" (2012) |

"Under" is a song by American R&B singer-songwriter Pleasure P. It was released as the third single off his first studio album The Introduction of Marcus Cooper. The song was co-written and produced by Tank and was released on May 10, 2009. The song received two Grammy nominations for Best Male R&B Vocal Performance and Best R&B Song at the 52nd Grammy Awards in 2010.

== Music video ==
The video was released on June 29, 2009 on Yahoo! Music. The video features actress Tia Mowry and Draya Michele. It became Pleasure P's first video to top BET's 106 & Park and was ranked #55 on the network's Notarized: Top 100 Videos of 2009 countdown.

== Chart performance ==
=== Weekly charts ===
| Chart (2009) | Peak position |
|---|---|
| US Billboard Hot 100 | 78 |
| US Hot R&B/Hip-Hop Songs (Billboard) | 5 |

=== Year-end charts ===
| Chart (2009) | Position |
|---|---|
| US Hot R&B/Hip-Hop Songs (Billboard) | 47 |
