= Boyfriend No. 2 =

2008 single by Pleasure P

"Boyfriend #2"

Single by Pleasure P

from the album The Introduction of Marcus Cooper
- Released: October 7, 2008
- Recorded: 2008
- Genre: R&B
- Length: 3:38
- Label: Atlantic, Swagga, Bluestar
- Songwriters: Marcus Ramone Cooper, Richard Preston Butler, Jr.
- Producers: Rico Love, EHood & E2

Pleasure P singles chronology
"Did You Wrong" (2008)	"Boyfriend #2" (2008)	"Hunt 4 U" (2008)

"Boyfriend #2" is a song by American R&B singer Pleasure P. It was released as the second single off his first studio album The Introduction of Marcus Cooper, and his second solo release after his departure from Pretty Ricky. The song was written and produced by Rico Love and EHood & E2 (for Division One) and was released on October 7, 2008.

"Boyfriend #2" has become Pleasure P's most successful solo single to date, peaking at #42 on the Billboard Hot 100 and #2 on the R&B/Hip-Hop Songs chart.

== Music video ==
The video was directed by Pleasure P and Kai Crawford, and premiered Tuesday, January 27 on Myspace.com and can be viewed here. The video was ranked #52 on BET's Notarized: Top 100 Videos of 2009 countdown.

== Remixes ==
- "Boyfriend #2" (The Council Remix) (featuring Flo Rida) (Official Remix)
- "Boyfriend #2" (Remix) (featuring Ludacris)
- "Boyfriend #2" (Remix) (featuring DJ Webstar)
- "Boyfriend #2" (Remix) (featuring Ghostface Killah)
- "Boyfriend #2" (Remix) (featuring Usher)
- "Boyfriend #2" (Remix) (featuring 2 Pistols)

== Charts ==
=== Weekly charts ===
Weekly chart performance
Chart (2008–2009)	Peak position
US Billboard Hot 100	42
US Hot R&B/Hip-Hop Songs (Billboard)	2
US Rhythmic Airplay (Billboard)	10

=== Year-end charts ===
Annual chart rankings
Chart (2009)	Position
US Hot R&B/Hip-Hop Songs (Billboard)	25
US Radio Songs (Billboard)	100
