= Make Her Feel Good =

2005 single by Teairra Marí

Single by Teairra Marí

from the album Roc-A-Fella Records Presents Teairra Marí
- Released: April 18, 2005
- Recorded: 2004–2005
- Genre: R&B; hip hop
- Length: 3:46
- Label: Roc-A-Fella; Def Jam
- Songwriters: Eric Barrier; V. Colapietro; N. Dinkins Jr.; Sean Garrett; William Griffin; Willie Hutchinson
- Producer: Sean Garrett

Teairra Marí singles chronology
"Make Her Feel Good" (2005)	"No Daddy" (2005)

Music video
- "Make Her Feel Good" on YouTube

"Make Her Feel Good" is the debut single recorded by American singer Teairra Marí, released on April 18, 2005. It serves as the lead single from her debut album Roc-A-Fella Records Presents Teairra Marí. The single did not debut on TRL after its premiere, but it did debut on BET's 106 & Park and peaked at number 2. The song conspicuously samples "My Melody" by Eric B. & Rakim.

The official remix features Kanye West and an intro by Jay-Z.

== Release ==
"Make Her Feel Good" was released as a CD, vinyl and digital single in April 2005 in the United Kingdom and the United States. In European countries, it was released as a CD and digital single in May 2005. The song was later certified Gold in the United Kingdom.

== Composition ==
"Make Her Feel Good" is a R&B and hip pop song. It features modern R&B stylings, repetitive melodic phrasing, a vocal-centric aesthetic, extensive vamping, minor key tonality and vocal harmonies. The song was produced by Eric Barrier, V. Colapietro, N. Dinkins Jr., Sean Garrett, William Griffin, Willie Hutchinson and was written by Garrett.

Marí defined "Make Her Feel Good" as "a female asking if there are any males that can hold a girl down and also treat them in a way they want to be treated.

== Critical reception ==
"Make Her Feel Good" received generally positive and favorable reviews from music critics.

Contactmusic.com reviewed and praised the song and stated "Championed by the Roc-A-Fella crew to muscle into the Mary, Beyonce, Missy and Ciara market place. Teairra comes with a real urban club bass driven monster that dares you not to nod ya head. Vocally T sounds good, she has the right image and looks good. 'Make Her Feel Good' is one of them booty shaking R&B grooves that you can simply imagine what the video will look like before you see it. It is a powerful pro woman song that begs the question does a female have to explain everything to her man without him taking the initiative. Does she really have to tell a man how to hold her, touch her, tell him that she is lonely or tell him when to call. No doubt there will be a male answer back with the lyrics, do have I to show you how to park, read a map or tell you when I want to make love (that is a joke by the way)." Reviewing Marí's debut studio album, The Boombox reviewed the song, stating, "Produced by Sean Garrett, 'Make Her Feel Good' contains a sample of Eric B. & Rakim's 'My Melody' and is bolstered by crisp drum kicks and hand claps, giving the golden era-inspired tune a slight modern-day twist. 'Do I have to tell a n---- how to touch me / Do I have to tell a n---- how to hold me / Do I have to tell a n---- when to call me / Do I have to tell a n---- when I'm lonely,' the Detroit native asks on the song. The first single released from her debut effort, it successfully helped introduce Mari to her fans."

== Commercial performance ==
Upon release, "Make Her Feel Good" entered the top 40 of the Billboard Hot 100 chart, peaking at number 35. It later managed to chart on other charts like US R&B Songs, US Hot R&B/Hip-Hop Songs, US Hot R&B/Hip-Hop Airplay, US Pop 100, Hot 100 Airplay, US Rhythmic Top 40 and many others.

== Music video ==
The music video premiered on June 20, 2005, and was directed by Ray Kay. It got very little play on MTV, but received strong play on BET. American rapper and Roc-A-Fella founder Jay-Z appears in the video.

=== Synopsis ===
The video follows as Marí and her friends walk around the city to find males that can hold her down. Later, after a few disappointments, Marí then walks up to Jay-Z as he is sitting on the apartment staircase. He puts a necklace on her and Marí puts up the official sign and signature of the Roc-A-Fella label with her hand. In the end, Marí can be seen walking away.

== Remix ==
A remix for "Make Her Feel Good" was later recorded. It was released in July 2005 via Google Play Music. The remix features Kanye West and an intro by Jay-Z. Two other remixes featuring guest appearances from Joe Budden and Miss NaNa.

== Live performances ==
"Make Her Feel Good" was performed many times. The song was first performed on 2005 at a live show. It was later performed at 106 & Park and then at Yahoo live. It was later performed a few years later at Pearls Music, then at Mod TV, then at WHIHH TV and later in 2013 at another live show.

== Track listing ==
- Digital download
1. "Make Her Feel Good" (radio edit) – 3:48
- Vinyl single
1. "Make Her Feel Good" (radio edit) – 3:48
2. "Make Her Feel Good" (album version) – 3:48
3. "Make Her Feel Good" (instrumental) – 3:47
- LP single
1. "Make Her Feel Good" (radio)
2. "Make Her Feel Good" (LP)
3. "Make Her Feel Good" (instrumental)
- CD single'
1. "Make Her Feel Good" (dirty)
2. "Make Her Feel Good" (clean)
3. "No Daddy" (dirty)
4. "No Daddy" (clean)
5. "Stay in Ya Lane" (dirty)
6. "Stay in Ya Lane" (clean)
7. "Get Down Tonight" (dirty)
8. "Get Down Tonight" (clean)
9. "Phone Booth" (dirty)
10. "Phone Booth" (clean)
11. "Get Up on Ya Gangsta" (dirty)
12. "Get Up on Ya Gangsta" (clean)
- Promo CD single
1. "Make Her Feel Good" (radio)
2. "Make Her Feel Good" (instrumental)
3. "Make Her Feel Good" (Call Out)

== Personnel ==
Personnel

Personnel credits adapted from AllMusic.

- Eric Barrier – composer
- V. Colapietro – composer
- N. Dinkins – composer
- Sean Garrett – composer
- William Griffin – composer
- Willie Hutchinson – composer
- Teairra Marí – primary artist

Production

Production credits adapted from the Discogs website.

- Arranged by (vocals) – Sean Garrett
- Instruments – The Co-Stars
- Mixed by – Leslie Brathwaite
- Producer – The Co-Stars*, Sean Garrett
- Producer (vocals) – Sean Garrett
- Recorded by – Jamie Newman, K. C., Mike Wilson
- Written by – Eric Barrier, N. Dinkins Jr., Sean Garrett, V. Colapietro, W. Griffin, W. Hutchinson

== Charts ==
Chart (2005)	Peak position
Netherlands Urban (MegaCharts)	16
US Billboard Hot 100	35
US Hot R&B/Hip-Hop Songs (Billboard)	9
US Pop 100 (Billboard)	82
US Rhythmic Airplay (Billboard)	15

== Release history ==
Country	Date	Format	Label
United Kingdom	April 2005	12" single	Roc-A-Fella Records
United Kingdom	April 2005	CD single; digital download	Def Jam Recordings
United States	April 2005	12" vinyl single	Roc-A-Fella Records; Def Jam Recordings
United States	April 2005	CD single; digital download	Roc-A-Fella Records; Def Jam Recordings
Australia	May 2005	CD single; digital download	Roc-A-Fella Records; Def Jam Recordings
Italy	May 2005	CD single; digital download	Roc-A-Fella Records; Def Jam Recordings
China	May 2005	CD single; digital download	Roc-A-Fella Records; Def Jam Recordings
Japan	May 2005	CD single; digital download	Roc-A-Fella Records; Def Jam Recordings
Germany	May 2005	CD single; digital download	Roc-A-Fella Records; Def Jam Recordings
France	May 2005	CD single; digital download	Roc-A-Fella Records; Def Jam Recordings
Canada	May 2005	CD single; digital download	Roc-A-Fella Records; Def Jam Recordings
Austria	May 2005	CD single; digital download	Roc-A-Fella Records; Def Jam Recordings
Brazil	May 2005	CD single; digital download	Roc-A-Fella Records; Def Jam Recordings
Denmark	May 2005	CD single; digital download	Roc-A-Fella Records; Def Jam Recordings
Sweden	May 2005	CD single; digital download	Roc-A-Fella Records; Def Jam Recordings
Mexico	May 2005	CD single; digital download	Roc-A-Fella Records; Def Jam Recordings
New Zealand	May 2005	CD single; digital download	Roc-A-Fella Records; Def Jam Recordings
Ireland	May 2005	CD single; digital download	Roc-A-Fella Records; Def Jam Recordings
