= Roc-A-Fella Records Presents Teairra Marí =

Roc-A Fella Records Presents Teairra Marí

Studio album by Teairra Marí
- Released: August 2, 2005
- Length: 43:34
- Label: Roc-A-Fella; Def Jam
- Producer: Anthony "T.A." Tate; AllStar; Joel Campbell; Blackout Movement; The Co-Stars; Cool & Dre; Bryan-Michael Cox; Kendrick Dean; Sean Garrett; Rodney "Darkchild" Jerkins; Kwamé; Poli Paul; The Trackboyz

Singles from Teairra Marí
- 1. "Make Her Feel Good" Released: April 18, 2005; 2. "No Daddy" Released: August 16, 2005; 3. "Phone Booth" Released: November 1, 2005

Roc-A-Fella Records Presents Teairra Marí is the debut studio album by American singer Teairra Marí. It was released on August 2, 2005, by Roc-A-Fella Records.

== Background ==
At the age of 16, Marí's mentor, K.I.S.S. Productions executive Big Mike, felt that she was ready to launch her music career, and he brought the singer in front of a who's who of several label execs. Candy Tookes, a friend of Big Mike, introduced the pair to industry veteran Daryl Simmons in Atlanta, Georgia. Simmons then shared Marí's demo disc with Antonio "L.A." Reid, Chairman of the Island Def Jam Music Group. After hearing Marí perform live, Reid offered her a contract on the spot. According to Shakir Stewart, VP A&R at Def Jam, in an interview with HitQuarters, "Teairra was a star when she walked into the room. She captured the room when she did her audition. We fell in love with her from day one."

== Promotion ==
Roc-A-Fella Records Presents Teairra Marí was preceded by lead single "Make Her Feel Good," released on April 18, 2005. The song reached number 35 on the US Billboard Hot 100. Follow-up single peaked at a number 84 on the Hot R&B/Hip-Hop Songs chart. "Phone Booth" was released as the third single on November 1, 2005 but failed to chart.

== Critical reception ==
Professional ratings
Review scores
| Source | Rating |
|---|---|
| AllMusic | 4/5 stars |
| Blender | 3/5 stars |
| Rolling Stone | 3/5 stars |
| Slant Magazine | 2.5/5 stars |

AllMusic editor Andy Kellman found that "despite her age and the amount of assistance, [Marí] sounds seasoned and in charge, entirely aware of who she is and what she's capable of doing. There's too much feeling, too much knowing – in her voice to enable the common kneejerk criticism that she's merely a puppet with all the right connections. A lean album at 45 minutes (with no guest verses or anything ending in "-lude"), at least five of its songs deserve as much play as the lead single, all of which are different enough from one another (both lyrically and sonically) to establish Marí as one to watch." Rolling Stone critic Christian Hoard compared Roc-A-Fella Records Presents Teairra Marí to singer Beyoncé's music and wrote: "The debut from Detroit native Teairra Mari is full of Knowlesian crooning and sex appeal, although the seventeen-year-old Mari doesn't have her idol's vocal presence yet."

== Chart performance ==
The album debuted and peaked at number five on the US Billboard 200, selling 69,000 copies in the first week. By September 2008, Roc-A-Fella Records Presents Teairra Marí had sold 248,000 units, according to Nielsen SoundScan.

== Track listing ==
Roc-A-Fella Records Presents Teairra Marí track listing
| No. | Title | Writer(s) | Producer(s) | Length |
|---|---|---|---|---|
| 1. | "Make Her Feel Good" | Neely Dinkins, Jr.; Sean Garrett; Vito Colapietro | The Co-Stars; Garrett | 3:46 |
| 2. | "No Daddy" | Garrett; Teairra Thomas; Tomas Simons; Winston Thomas | Garrett; Simons^{[a]}; Thomas^{[a]} | 3:45 |
| 3. | "New Sh*t" | Kwamé Holland | Kwamé | 3:36 |
| 4. | "Stay in Ya Lane" | LaShawn Daniels; Rodney Jerkins | Jerkins | 3:50 |
| 5. | "Act Right" | Adonis Shropshire; Bryan-Michael Cox; Wayne Wells | Cox | 4:11 |
| 6. | "M.V.P." | Allen Gordon, Jr.; Charles Mack; J.J. Jennings; Makeba Riddick | Allstar; Joel Campbell^{[b]} | 3:45 |
| 7. | "La La" | Joe Kent; Mark Williams; Garrett | Garrett; The Trackboyz | 3:52 |
| 8. | "Get Down Tonight" | Andre Lyon; Marcello Valenzano | Cool & Dre | 3:41 |
| 9. | "Phone Booth" | Cox; Kendrick Dean; Garrett; T. Thomas | Cox; WyldCard; Garrett | 4:39 |
| 10. | "Confidential" | Rufus Morgan; Garrett; Tadd Mingo; T. Thomas | Free Agentz; Garrett | 3:04 |
| 11. | "Get Up On Ya Gangsta" | Paul Poli | Poli | 3:39 |
| 12. | "No Daddy" (Remix) | Holland | Kwamé | 3:53 |

Japanese bonus track
| No. | Title | Writer(s) | Producer(s) | Length |
|---|---|---|---|---|
| 13. | "You Better Recognize" | Garrett | Garrett | 3:24 |

Notes

- ^{^[a]} signifies a co-producer
- ^{^[b]} signifies an additional producer

Sample credits

- "Make Her Feel Good" contains interpolations from the composition "My Melody" (1986) as written by Eric B. & Rakim as well as a sample from "California My Way" (1974) as performed by Main Ingredient.

== Charts ==
Chart performance for Roc-A-Fella Records Presents Teairra Marí
| Chart (2005) | Peak position |
|---|---|
| US Billboard 200 | 5 |
| US Top R&B/Hip-Hop Albums (Billboard) | 2 |
