= The Introduction of Marcus Cooper =

Studio album by Pleasure P
- Released: June 9, 2009
- Recorded: 2007–09
- Genre: R&B
- Length: 45:36
- Labels: Bluestar; Swagga; Atlantic
- Producers: Craig Kallman (exec.); Pleasure P (also exec.); Bryant McKinnie (co-exec.); 1852 Productions; santana Tanababy Robinson Adonis; D-Town; Don Vito; Jack Rabbit Slim; Rico Love; Rudy; Static Major; Tank; Tha Bizness; The Co-Stars; The Movement

Pleasure P chronology
Late Night Special (2007)	The Introduction of Marcus Cooper (2009)

Singles from The Introduction of Marcus Cooper
- 1. "Did You Wrong" Released: June 16, 2008; 2. "Boyfriend #2" Released: October 7, 2008; 3. "Under" Released: May 10, 2009

Professional ratings
Review scores
Source	Rating
AllMusic	3.5/5 stars

The Introduction of Marcus Cooper (Note: The title refers to the singer's birth name.) is the debut solo studio album by American recording artist and former Pretty Ricky vocalist Pleasure P. It was released on June 9, 2009, through Bluestar Entertainment, Swagga Entertainment and Atlantic Records. Production was handled by Tha Bizness, Rico Love, Rudy Sandapa, Static Major, Tank, 1852 Productions, Adonis, D-Town, Don Vito, Jack Rabbit Slim, The Co-Stars and The Movement. It features guest appearance from Yung Joc. The album reached number 10 on the US Billboard 200 and number 2 on Top R&B/Hip-Hop Albums charts, selling 39,000 copies in its first week. It was nominated for a Grammy Award for Best Contemporary R&B Album at the 52nd Annual Grammy Awards, but lost to Beyoncé's I Am... Sasha Fierce.

The album produced three successful singles—"Did You Wrong", "Boyfriend #2" and "Under"—which all made it to the US Billboard Hot 100, landing at No. 90, 42 and 78, respectively. The song "Under" was nominated for Grammy Award for Best Male R&B Vocal Performance and Grammy Award for Best R&B Song, but lost to Maxwell's "Pretty Wings" and Beyoncé's "Single Ladies (Put a Ring on It)" in the respective categories.

== Track listing ==
No.	Title	Writer(s)	Producer(s)	Length
1.	"I'm a Beast" (featuring Yung Joc)	Marcus Cooper; Jasiel Robinson; Adonis Shropshire	Adonis	4:04
2.	"Boyfriend #2"	Cooper; Justin Henderson; Christopher Whitacre; Richard Preston Butler Jr.; Earl Joseph Hood; Eric Goudy; Rex Zamor	Rico Love; EHood (co.); E2 (co.)	3:38
3.	"Tender Roni (Handcuffin)"	Cooper; Butler Jr.; Rodney Richard	Rico Love; Don Vito	4:12
4.	"Under"	Cooper; Durrell Babbs; Joseph Alonzo Bereal, Jr.; Antonio Lamar Dixon; Robert Newt; Jerry Nelson Franklin; T. Olivia Jones; Kristina Marie Stephens	Tank	3:51
5.	"Let Me"	Cooper; Butler Jr.; Dwayne Sirvestor	Rico Love; D-Town	3:31
6.	"Gotta Have You"	Cooper; Babbs; Bereal	Tank	2:50
7.	"Did You Wrong"	Zamor	1852 Productions	4:19
8.	"Your Love"	Cooper; Butler Jr.; Damon Eden; Ray Romulus; Jared Jacobs; James Samuel Harris; Terry Lewis	Rico Love; Jack Rabbit Slim	3:30
9.	"Fire Lovin"	Cooper; Stephen Garrett; Rudy Sandapa	Static Major; Rudy	4:10
10.	"Birthday Suit"	Cooper; James Bunton; Corron Cole	The Movement	4:10
11.	"Illusion"	Cooper; Garrett; Sandapa	Static Major; Rudy	3:22
12.	"Dream in the Air"	Cooper; Neely Dinkins; Vito Colapietro; Bereal; Les Burwell	Co-Stars	3:50
Total length:				45:36

== Charts ==
Chart performance for The Introduction of Marcus Cooper
Chart (2009)	Peak position
US Billboard 200	10
US Top R&B/Hip-Hop Albums (Billboard)	2
