= Did You Wrong =

2008 single by Pleasure P

Single by Pleasure P

from the album The Introduction of Marcus Cooper
- Released: June 16, 2008
- Recorded: 2007
- Genre: R&B
- Length: 4:20
- Label: Atlantic
- Songwriter(s): Rex Zamor, Noble Prince Hart
- Producer(s): Rex Zamor

Pleasure P singles chronology
"Did You Wrong" (2008)	"Boyfriend #2" (2009)

"Did You Wrong" is a song by American R&B singer Pleasure P. It is his debut single from his first studio album The Introduction of Marcus Cooper. It is his first solo release after his departure from Pretty Ricky. The song was produced by R. Zamor and was released in June 2008.

== Remixes ==
- "Did You Wrong" (Remix) (featuring Teairra Marí) (Official Remix)
- "Did You Wrong" (C-hansen Remix) (featuring Chris Hansen)

== Charts ==
=== Weekly charts ===
Chart (2008)	Peak position
US Billboard Hot 100	90
US Hot R&B/Hip-Hop Songs (Billboard)	20
US Rhythmic (Billboard)	23

=== Year-end charts ===
Chart (2008)	Position
US Hot R&B/Hip-Hop Songs (Billboard)	79
