= Pleasure P =

American R&B singer

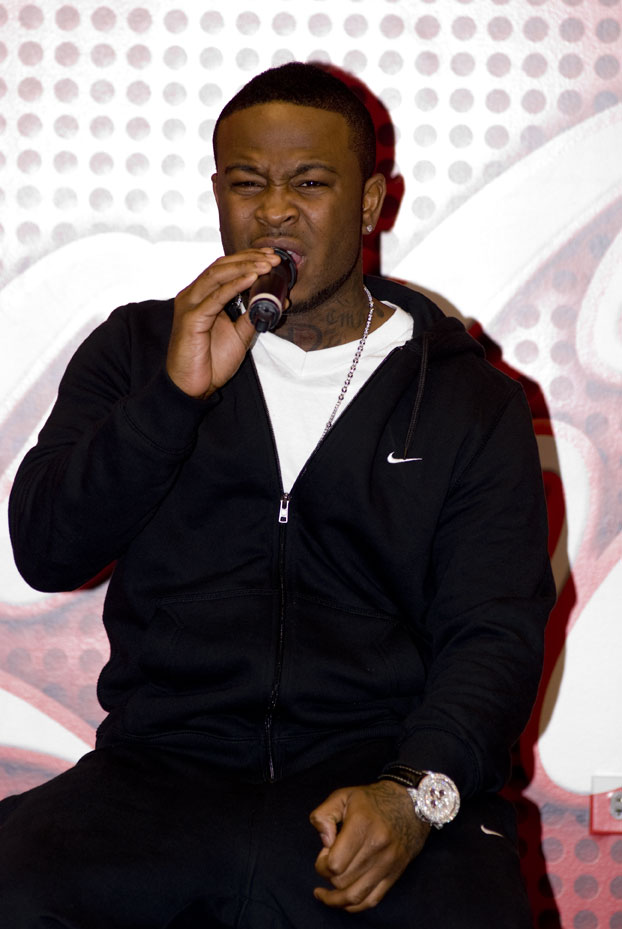
- Pleasure P in Chicago (2009)

Background information
- Also known as: P. Dupriney; P. Ron
- Born: Marcus Ramone Cooper
- Origin: Miami, Florida, U.S.
- Genres: R&B
- Occupations: Singer; songwriter; record producer
- Works: Pleasure P discography
- Years active: 1997–present
- Labels: Swagga Entertainment; EMPIRE (current); Atlantic; E1 Music (former)
- Member of: Pretty Ricky; R.S.V.P.

Marcus Ramone Cooper Sr, better known by his stage name Pleasure P, is an American R&B singer who experienced success as a member of the group Pretty Ricky before embarking on a solo career in 2007. His 2008 debut solo single "Did You Wrong" peaked at number 90 on the Billboard Hot 100 while follow-up singles—"Boyfriend #2" and "Under" peaked at numbers 42 and 78 respectively—the former of which remains his highest charting song on the Hot 100. All three preceded the release of his debut studio album The Introduction of Marcus Cooper (2009), which peaked at number 10 on the Billboard 200 and earned him a Grammy nomination for Best Contemporary R&B Album at the 52nd Annual Grammy Awards.

== Career ==
=== 2009–2012: The Introduction of Marcus Cooper ===
After leaving the group Pretty Ricky, Pleasure P began working on his solo career, he released his solo debut single "Did You Wrong" on July 22, 2008. The single debuted at No. 90 on the Billboard 100 Hot charts, and debuted at No. 20 on the top R&B/Hip-Hop charts as well. Pleasure P also released a 2008 EP entitled "Boyfriend #2", including "Did You Wrong" and a promo single "Boyfriend #2", released digitally and as an LP disc. Videos for "Did You Wrong" and "Boyfriend #2" were released digitally and on MySpace. Later on in 2009 he also released the song "Under" from the album. His solo debut album, The Introduction of Marcus Cooper was released on June 9, 2009. The album was originally to be released in January, but was finally released after several delays. Pleasure P's career received a boost by being featured in the second single from Flo Rida's album R.O.O.T.S., gaining publicity from his presence on its guest list. In 2012, he appeared in Bad Girls Club 8: Las Vegas.

=== 2012: New label and King of Romance ===
On June 21, 2012, Pleasure P. released the first single off his upcoming second album titled "I Love Girls" featuring Young Money artist Tyga. His upcoming album is entitled King of Romance and is due out later this year. This will be the first album off of his new record deal with E1 Music. Pleasure P is working on his second single called "I Really Need to Know". On September 16, 2013, Pleasure P came out with a new single called " Kiss Me".

=== 2014-present: Pleasure P New Mixtape Pretty Ricky Reunion, and Present ===
On February 6, 2014, Pleasure P announced on his official Instagram that he will be releasing his first single titled " Letter to My Ex." from his mixtape "Break Up to Make Up", in which was released on February 14, 2014.

In 2014, Pleasure P and the original members of his former group Pretty Ricky to announce an official reunion. The reunion aims an international reunion tour and a new album (Bluestars 2) with all the original members. The first commercial single of the group is called "Puddles" has been released during Valentine's Day 2015. In 2018, Pleasure P is featured in Love & Hip Hop: Miami with his girlfriend for 2 years Shay Johnson and the rest of the Pretty Ricky crew such as Spectacular talking about the Pretty Ricky reunion, new album, New tours and more.

In 2022, Pleasure P participated in the web series Verzuz, where he and teammate Sammie challenged Bobby V and Ray J. Their match was popularly watched by many viewers as they had viral moments that led to misunderstandings from fellow R&B artists expressing their disdain on how they handled themselves as artist from that event. Pleasure P became very vocal after Q. Parker of 112 posted a video online criticizing majority of the artists on that Verzuz roster line up for their 'misrepresentation' of men in the R&B genre and how they handled themselves as Pleasure P quickly responded back in a way to resolve the issue by ranting himself. Q Parker later apologized stating he may stand on some of his beliefs but he was misunderstood. A few days later the four, who participated in their Verzuz, came together on social media to discuss plans on forming a supergroup. They came up with the idea to name themselves R.S.V.P. The group is currently in development and production stages and due to release an EP later this year.

== Personal life ==
Pleasure dated comedian Eddie Murphy's daughter Bria in 2008, but the two broke up after two years.

In March 2020, Pleasure was arrested for battery outside of a Checkers in Miami Gardens, Florida.

== Discography ==
- The Introduction of Marcus Cooper (2009)
- 4 Ur Pleasure Vol. 1 (2010)
- Break Up To Make Up (2014)
- She Likes (2018)
- Pleasure P Presents (2018)
- Pleasure & Pain (2021)
- Pain & Pleasure (2021)

== Tours ==
- 2009: America's Most Wanted Tour
- 2009: Summer Jam XXIII In Fayetteville, NC
- 2019: The Millennium Tour

== Awards and nominations ==
- Grammy Award

Year	Nominee / work	Award	Result
2010	"Under"	Best Male R&B Vocal Performance	Nominated
2010	"Under"	Best R&B Song	Nominated
2010	The Introduction of Marcus Cooper	Best Contemporary R&B Album	Nominated
