= Teairra Mari =

American singer-songwriter, dancer, and actress from Michigan

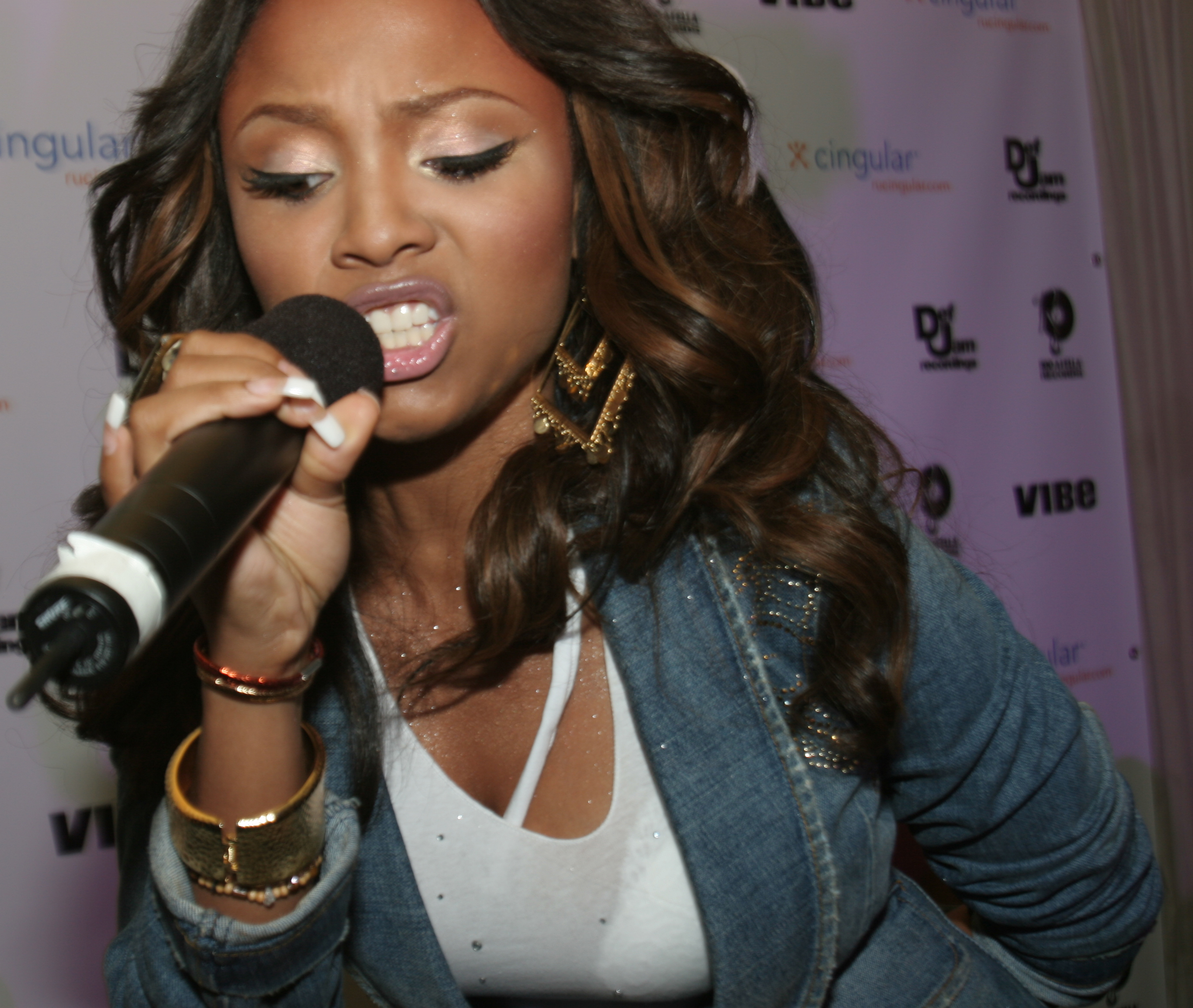
- Thomas performing in 2005

Background information
- Born: Teairra Marquisha Thomas; December 2, 1987 (age 38); Detroit, Michigan, U.S.
- Education: Detroit School of Arts
- Genres: R&B; pop
- Occupations: Singer; songwriter; dancer; actress; model
- Instrument: Vocals
- Years active: 2003–present
- Labels: Division 1; Asylum; Warner Bros.; Fo' Reel; Interscope; Def Jam; Roc-A-Fella; K.I.S.S.

Teairra Marquisha Thomas (born December 2, 1987) is an American singer-songwriter, dancer, and actress. At the age of 16, she signed with Def Jam Recordings and Jay-Z's Roc-A-Fella Records and released her debut studio album, Roc-A-Fella Records Presents Teairra Marí (2005). It peaked at number five on the Billboard 200 and was supported by the Billboard Hot 100-top 40 single, "Make Her Feel Good".

In 2008, she returned to the music scene with her single "Hunt 4 U" (featuring Pleasure P). After constant leaks, she re-recorded a second attempt at her second album, At That Point, which was later shelved. In 2010, she appeared in the film Lottery Ticket alongside rappers Bow Wow and Ice Cube.

== Career ==
=== Early life and career beginnings ===
Born in Detroit, Marí sung in church and she was influenced by the music of Motown acts and Aaliyah, Monica, and Brandy Norwood. Her grandmother was a background singer for Aretha Franklin. Marí attended Detroit High School for the Fine and Performing Arts. After Antonio "L.A." Reid heard Marí perform live, he offered her a contract. According to VP A&R at Island Def Jam Music Group Shakir Stewart, in an interview with HitQuarters, "Teairra was a star when she walked into the room. She captured the room when she did her audition. We fell in love with her from day one."

=== 2004–2006: Teairra Marí ===
Marí worked with Jay-Z in his first collaboration project since becoming president of Def Jam Records, to create "Make Her Feel Good" along with producer Sean Garrett, the lead single from her debut album on Roc-A-Fella/Def Jam that reached number 35 on the Billboard Hot 100 and number 9 on the R&B chart. It was heavily played on BET but barely on MTV. The second single "No Daddy" had a video that led to commercial success on MTV. The video spent sixteen days on Total Request Live, reaching number four. Shortly after her third single "Phone Booth" was only sent to radio outlets and received a lukewarm response due to it not having a video and no promotion, she also made cameo appearances in various videos such as Biggie ("Nasty Girl"), 3LW ("Feelin You") Jay-Z ("Show Me What You Got") and played the leading lady in Sammie's video for "You Should Be My Girl". Teairra Marí's first album, Roc-A-Fella Records Presents Teairra Marí, was released on August 2, 2005 and was produced by Brian Michael Cox, Darkchild, Cool & Dre, Blackout Movement, The Trackboyz, Kwame and was co-executive produced by Sean Garrett. The album reached No. 5 on the Billboard 200 albums chart and No. 2 on the Top R&B/Hip-Hop Albums chart while modeling and doing ads for the Roca Wear campaign. The album sold 248,000 copies according to Nielsen Soundscan, as of November 11, 2009. Teairra started work on her second album entitled Second Round in 2006. The first single "Play Me" was scheduled to be released in the fall but production was stopped in the middle of the album. She received a phone call from her label before her high school graduation to inform her that she was being dropped.

=== 2007–2010: At That Point and mixtapes ===
In 2008, Marí signed a lucrative deal with Violator but decided to split and landed a new development deal with Fo' Reel under the wing of Cudda Love (the man responsible for Nelly's success). She was working on a new album titled At That Point with producers Rico Love, The Runners, The Underdogs and more. Featured on the album were Nicki Minaj, Flo Rida, Pleasure P, Soulja Boy, Gucci Mane, Kanye West and Rick Ross. On January 12, 2009 Teairra Marí released a Benny Boom-directed music video for "Hunt 4 U", which features Pleasure P. The second official single released from At That Point is "Cause a Scene" featuring Flo Rida. It was produced by The Runners. The third official single from the album "Sponsor" featuring Gucci Mane and Soulja Boy was released digitally on February 2, 2010 and the video was shot at a mansion in Los Angeles and was released on March 8, 2010. The album At That Point was scheduled to release the summer of 2010 but was eventually shelved due to so many tracks getting leaked online. She decided to reenter the studio to re-record the album with a new title.

Late 2009, Teairra Marí released her first mixtape Don't Make Me Cause a Scene, hosted by DJ Papa Smurf. Besides throwing all her singles on there she released before she released "Sponsor", plus adding "Diamonds" (with Kanye West), and "Automatic" (with Nicki Minaj), and remixing, "Birthday Sex" (Jeremih), "Turn My Swagg On" (Soulja Boy), "Blame It" (Jamie Foxx, T-Pain), "Turning Me Off" (Keri Hilson), and "Best I Ever Had" (Drake). It also features an official remix to "Cause A Scene", featuring rappers Flo' Rida, and Rick Ross.

She released her second mixtape entitled Point of No Return, hosted by DJ Drama on August 7, 2010. The mixtape contained leak songs like "I Know It's You", "Coins", "Find My Way Back", "Holla", and a song intended for the album called "Lights Go Down". She released four music videos to some of the songs she covered for the project. Usher's "Daddy's Home", covers to Drake's songs "Over" and his song "Find Your Love" titled "My Lovin'", and "Super High", a Rick Ross cover featuring a rapper named Cardan.

On August 17, 2010 she released Sincerely Yours, a digital EP released via iTunes, featuring the single "Sponsor", and new songs like "Body", and "Stranger". It also features songs made for At That Point that had not leaked, "Emergency", "Operator", and "Might Get Lucky". She released music videos to "Body" and "Stranger". She performed "Body" on The Mo'Nique show.

She released her third mixtape, The Night Before X-MAS, on December 24, 2010. It features a remix to "Devil in a New Dress" by Kanye West with the help of Rick Ross and also Mr. Vegas's ballroom reggae song "Boy Shorts" with him on it, covers to Chris Brown's "Deuces" featuring fellow recording artist Dondria, her rendition of the Wiz Khalifa song "Black and Yellow" titled "U Know What It Is", a cover to Rick Ross's song "Aston Martin Music", Diddy – Dirty Money's "Loving You No More", and other songs such as "Stay", "Round And Round", and "Back It Up" featuring rapper YG. She made videos to "U Know What It Is" and "Stay".

=== 2011–2012: Sex on the Radio and Division 1 ===
In March 2011, Marí, with Rico Love, executive producer of the album, began to work on new music for her album. A snippet of a song is heard in a clip of them recording the first single from the album, "That's All Me", which featured Rico Love. The song samples one of Diddy's early hits, "It's All About the Benjamins". "That's All Me" is a single on DJ T. Neal's album Not Your Average DJ, which features Rico Love and was also set to be included on Marí's album. Marí performed the song for the first time at R&B Live in Hollywood, and later revealed on the set of the video that she had departed from Warner Bros and had signed a deal with Rico Love's label Division1. Due to the large amount of leftover material from the album, Marí released a fourth mixtape titled Now or Never on May 30, 2011.

"U Did That" was later released as the first single from Marí's second album, and was written and produced by Rico Love and co-produced by D-Town. Marí said that the single would be going for radio adds sometime in January 2012. Marí then released a video of her and Rico Love in the studio and talking about the new album. "It's absolutely amazing the chemistry that Rico and I share. I couldn't ask for another partner in crime. [...] There are a lot of talented songwriters out there, but for me, my chemistry is with Rico and I haven't had a chemistry like this with anybody else. Everybody has their match and I think Rico is definitely my musical match." The song was later remixed featuring rapper 2 Chainz, and the music video was shot. Marí described the reasoning for the title of the album by saying "It's reminiscent of a new jack swing, like '90s R&B, bedroom music but with a bounce."

=== 2014–present: "Deserve" and "Rehab" ===
In December 2014, Marí released a single, "Deserve", produced by Hitmaka. In 2019, she released an EP, "Rehab". On January 12, 2024, she released a single, "Take Me Out".

== Acting career ==
In 2009, she appeared in The Magnificent Cooly-T, followed in 2010's Lottery Ticket playing opposite Bow Wow. During 2013, the cable network UP premiered her in The Dempsey Sisters with Lynn Whitfield, Denyce Lawton and Clifton Powell.

== Reality television ==
From 2011 to 2012, she had a supporting role on season two of the VH1 hit reality show Love & Hip Hop: New York. In 2014, she appeared in a main role on the Love & Hip Hop spinoff: Love & Hip Hop: Hollywood.

== Discography ==
- Roc-A-Fella Records Presents Teairra Marí (2005)

== Filmography ==
=== Film ===
Year	Title	Role	Notes
2009	The Magnificent Cooly-T	Sonya	
2010	Lottery Ticket	Nikki Swayze	
2012	Mac & Devin Go to High School	Ms. Huck	
2013	Holla II	Tatianna	
2013	The Dempsey Sisters	Sheena Dempsey	
2025	Afraid?	Lisa	

=== Television ===
Year	Title	Role	Notes
2006	Showtime at the Apollo	Herself	Episode: "Teairra Marí"
2011–12	Love & Hip Hop: New York	Herself	Recurring Cast: Season 2
2014–19	Love & Hip Hop: Hollywood	Herself	Main Cast: Season 1-5, Recurring Cast: Season 6
2017	The Real	Herself/Guest Co-Host	Episode: "Teairra Mari/Erica Campbell/Tina Campbell"
2022–23	Family Reunion: Love & Hip Hop Edition	Herself	Main Cast: Season 3
